= Fleener =

Fleener may refer to:

- Fleener (surname)
- Fleener, Indiana, U.S.
