= Fleenor =

Fleenor is a surname. Notable people with the surname include:

- Jenee Fleenor (fl. 2001), American musician
- Kenneth Raymond Fleenor (1929–2010), American Vietnam War veteran

== See also ==
- Fleener (surname)
- Alice Fleenor Sturgis
