= Oregon City High School =

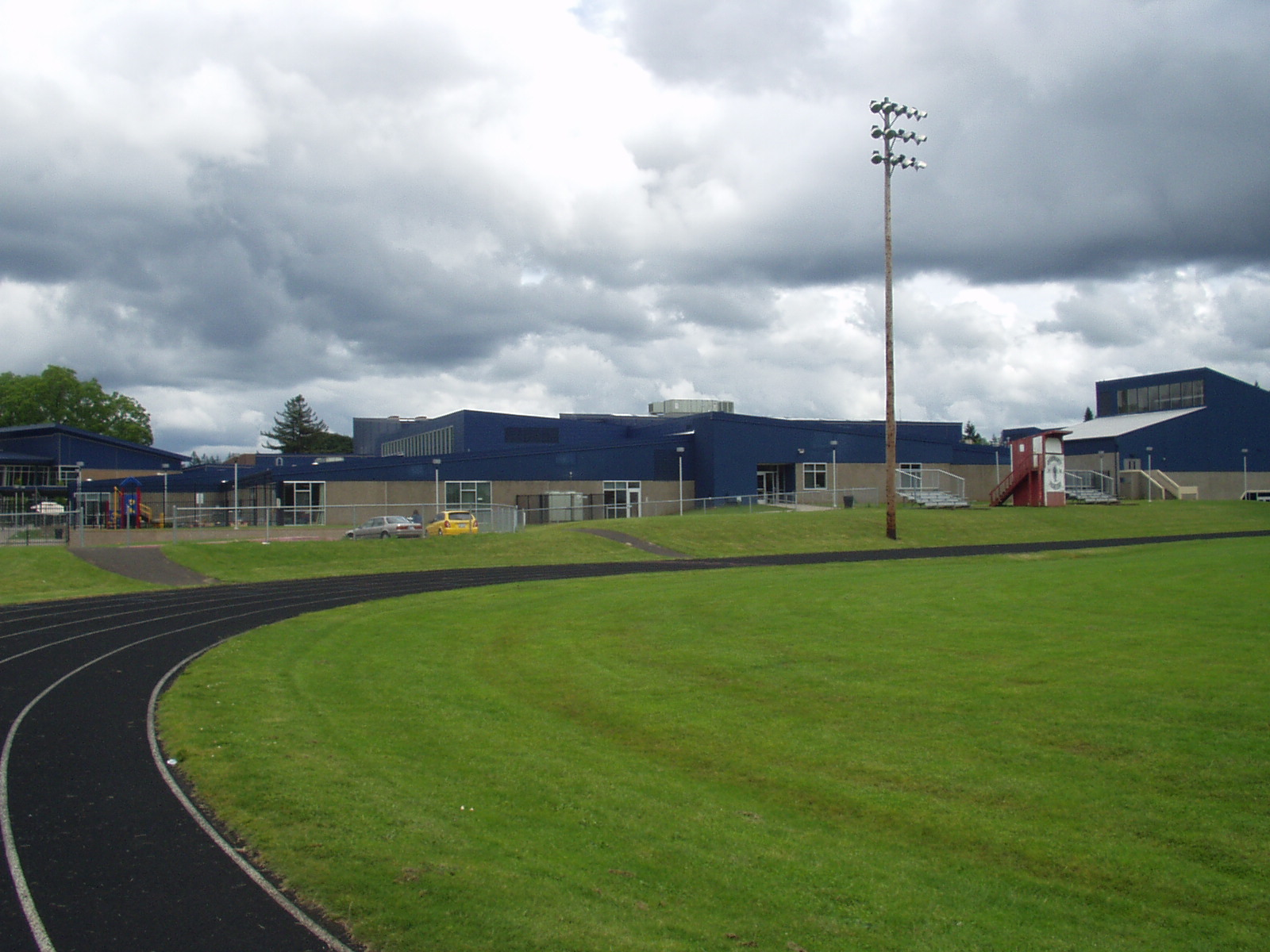

Location
- 19761 South Beavercreek Road; Oregon City, Oregon; 45.32°N 122.56°W

Information
- Type: Public
- Established: 1885; 141 years ago 2003, current campus
- School district: Oregon City School District
- Principal: Greg Timmons
- Teaching staff: 78.76 (FTE)
- Grades: 9–12
- Enrollment: 1,928 (2023–2024)
- Student to teacher ratio: 24.48
- Colors: Red & White
- Athletics conference: OSAA Three Rivers League (6A)
- Mascot: Pioneer Pete
- Team name: Pioneers
- Rival: West Linn High School
- Newspaper: The Elevator
- Feeder schools: Gardiner Middle School, Tumwata Middle School
- Website: www.ochspioneers.org

Oregon City High School (OCHS) is a public high school in the northwest United States in Oregon City, Oregon, a suburb south of Portland.

== History ==
Oregon City High School was established 141 years ago in 1885 on the lower level of Oregon City on Jackson Street (45.357°N 122.596°W). Due to the growing number of students in the late 1980s, a freshman campus was established in 1989 at Moss Junior High School on the southeast side of Oregon City and the main campus had just the upper three grades (10–12) for its last fourteen years.

In the early 2000s, construction began on the Moss Campus for the new high school, often referred to as Beavercreek. With its completion in 2003, OCHS became a four-year high school again for the 2003–04 school year. The original 1885 campus on Jackson was closed in 2003 due to the aftereffects of multiple disasters (fires and earthquakes) and the inability to effectively repair the damage. It is now the campus for the Clackamas Academy of Industrial Sciences (CAIS), and is still in use for basketball games and other activities.

Pioneer Memorial Stadium, adjacent to the 1885 campus, continues as the OCHS venue for football, soccer, lacrosse, and track and field.

== Academics ==
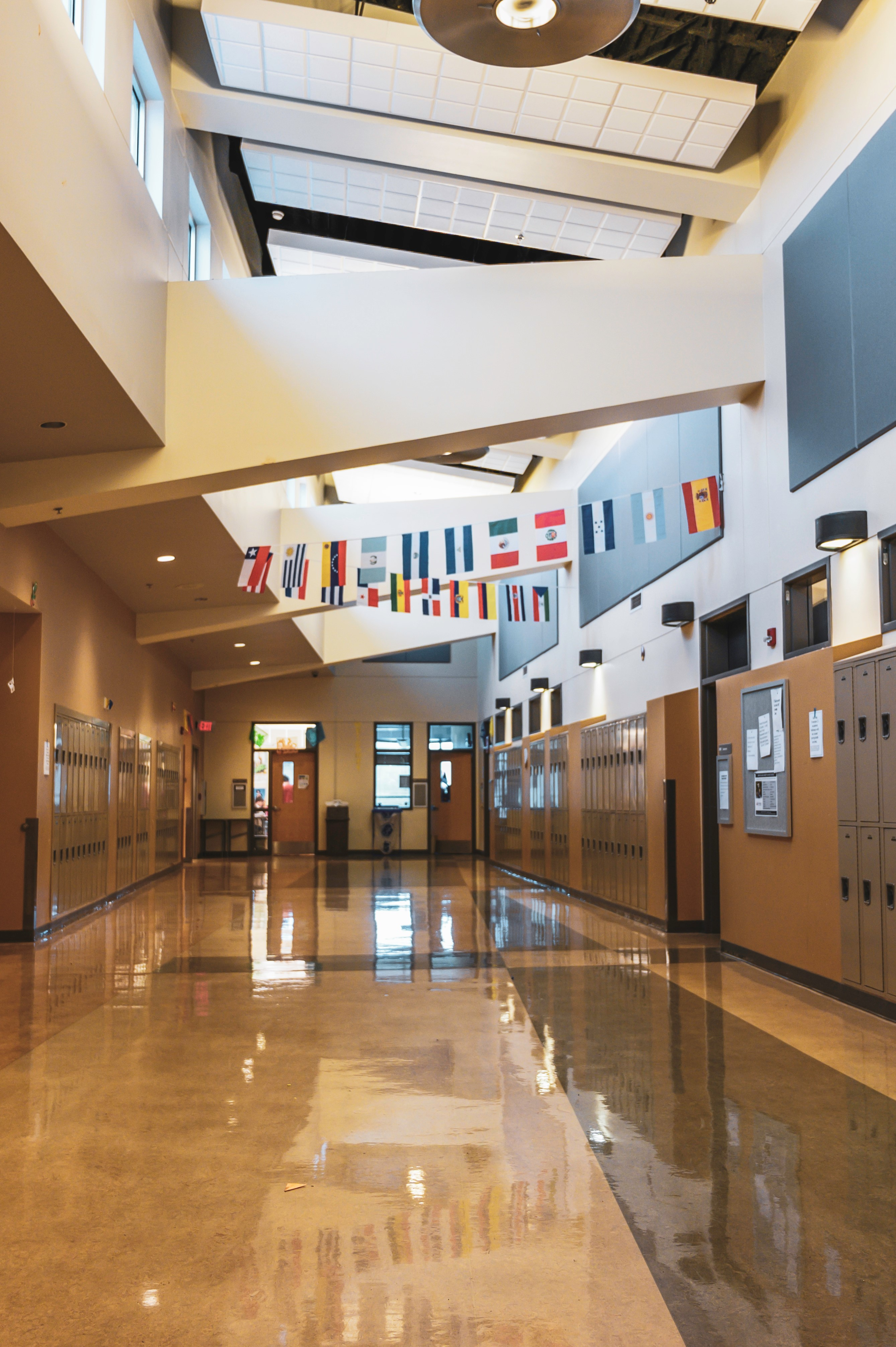
Hallway at OCHS

In 1985, Oregon City High School was honored in the Blue Ribbon Schools Program, the highest honor a school can receive in the United States.

Oregon City offers 14 Advanced Placement courses and is connected to Clackamas Community College, where some Oregon City courses are taught by professors.

In 2008, 85% of the school's seniors received a high school diploma. Of 474 students, 405 graduated, 46 dropped out, five received a modified diploma, and 18 were still in high school the following year.

In 2009, The Oregonian described the school as an "overachiever" at teaching reading and math, due to its achievement scores.

== Extracurricular activities ==
=== Choir ===
The Rendezvous Jazz Choir took first place at the Pleasant Hill Jazz festival. The OC Master Choir performed the song "Raua Needmine" (Curse Upon Iron) by the Estonian composer Veljo Tormis in the 2009 school year.

=== Athletics ===
The girls' basketball program won three consecutive USA Today girls' national championships from 1995 to 1997, as well as state championships in 1992, 1994, 1995, 1996, 1997, 1998, 2001, 2002, 2003, 2004, 2009, and 2014. They have placed at the State Tournament 24 years in a row starting in 1987.

=== State championships ===
- Girls' lacrosse: 2009, 2010
- Baseball: 2012
- Boys' cross country: 1996
- Girls' track & field: 1988, 1989, 2021
- Boys' Track & Field: 2017
- Dance: 1992

== Controversies ==
=== Political cartoon controversy ===
During the 2004–2005 school year, a political cartoon drawn by a student concerning the border issue between Mexico and the United States, was taken out of context, making national news. The cartoon was a depiction of two vigilante patrolmen discussing a "point system" for the capture of illegal immigrants. Local news coverage of the issue soon expanded to national coverage, bringing aboth criticism and support for the cartoonist and the newspaper.

=== Social media controversy ===
During the 2016–2017 school year, a Twitter post that showed a group of students holding a sign that included a racial slur was released, stirring controversy. In the following days, many of the students united to express their views and opinions of the incident by walking out of the classrooms and gathering in the school courtyard.

=== Voices assembly controversy ===
During the 2021-2022 school year, a committee on the OCHS student council in cooperation with school administration designed a virtual assembly that shared student stories of mental health struggles where one student story disturbed many students and parents. The student described emotional and physical abuse he had perpetrated towards an ex-girlfriend who still attended the school. This prompted a school-wide "walk-out," the resignation of then-principal Carey Wilhelm, and a lawsuit.

== Notable alumni ==
- Rebecca Anderson, Miss Oregon 2014
- James J. Brady (physicist), 1923
- Jonah Nickerson, baseball player, Detroit Tigers
- Shannon O'Keefe (né Rondeau), professional bowler, Team USA Bowling
- Ron Saltmarsh, composer
- Ian Shields, football coach at Minot State University.
- Brad Tinsley, basketball player, Vanderbilt
- Trevor Wilson, baseball player, San Francisco Giants and Anaheim Angels
- Tyrone S. Woods, U.S. Navy Seal
- Lindsey Yamasaki, basketball player
