= Miss America 1988 =

61st Miss America pageant

- Date: September 19, 1987
- Presenters: Gary Collins
- Venue: Boardwalk Hall, Atlantic City, New Jersey
- Broadcaster: NBC
- Winner: Kaye Lani Rae Rafko; Michigan

Miss America 1988, the 61st Miss America pageant, was held at the Boardwalk Hall in Atlantic City, New Jersey on September 19, 1987, on NBC Network.

Pageant winner Kaye Lani Rae Rafko of Michigan became a registered nurse, and has done many years of volunteer work for medical charities and hospices. She co-hosts a public access television series called Only In Monroe for MPACT.

Among the contestants was Miss South Carolina, television personality Nancy O'Dell, entered as Nancy Humphries.

== Results ==
=== Placements ===
Placement	Contestant
Miss America 1988	Michigan – Kaye Lani Rae Rafko
1st Runner-Up	Louisiana – Patricia Brant
2nd Runner-Up	Nevada – Stacie James
3rd Runner-Up	Colorado – LaTanya Hall
4th Runner-Up	Mississippi – Toni Seawright
Top 10	Florida – Jennifer Anne Sauder; Maryland – Tamara Alaine Walker; Missouri – Robin Elizabeth Riley; Texas – Jo Thompson; Virginia – Heidi Lammi

=== Awards ===
==== Preliminary awards ====
Awards	Contestant
Lifestyle and Fitness	(Georgia (U.S. state)) Georgia – Kelly Jerles; Michigan – Kaye Lani Rae Rafko; South Carolina – Nancy Evelyn Humphries
Talent	Louisiana – Patricia Brant; Nevada – Stacie James; Wisconsin – Maria Kim

==== Non-finalist awards ====
Awards	Contestant
Talent	Connecticut – Michele Dawn Eaton; (Georgia (U.S. state)) Georgia – Kelly Jerles; Illinois – Cindi Hodgkins; Indiana – Sheila Renee Stephen; Maine – Laurie Wathen; Massachusetts – Aurelie McCarthy; Oklahoma – Leesa Cornett; Wisconsin – Maria Kim

== Candidates ==
State	Name	Age	Hometown	Local Title	Talent	Placement	Special Awards	Notes
Alabama	Kym Williams	22	Birmingham	Miss All-American Bowl	Vocal, "If We Only Have Love"			
Alaska	Teresa Murton	25	Anchorage	Miss Anchorage	Vocal, "Battle Hymn of the Republic"			
Arizona	Theresa Light	18	Tucson	Miss Western Maricopa	Vocal, "Somewhere"			
Arkansas	Carole Lawson	21	Paragould	Miss University of Arkansas	Flute/Piccolo, Medley from Carmen			Previously National Sweetheart 1986
California	Simone Stephens	25	Cerritos	Miss El Camino	Stand-up Comedy			
Colorado	LaTanya Hall	22	Boulder	Miss Boulder Valley	Vocal, "I Am Changing"	3rd runner-up		
Connecticut	Michele Dawn Eaton	21	Shelton	Miss Fairfield County	Baton Twirling, "They're Playing Our Song"		Non-finalist Talent Award	
Delaware	Anne Marie Jarka	21	Newark	Miss University	Vocal/Piano, "Almost Over You"		George Cavalier Talent Award	
(Washington, D.C.) District of Columbia	Cheryl Chapman	21	Arlington, VA		Vocal, "Come Rain or Come Shine"			
Florida	Jennifer Anne Sauder	22	Homestead	Miss Homestead	Semi-classical Vocal, "If We Were in Love" from Yes, Giorgio	Top 10		
(Georgia (U.S. state)) Georgia	Kelly Jerles	20	Perry	Miss Cobb County	Vocal, "Where the Boys Are"		Non-finalist Talent Award Preliminary Lifestyle & Fitness Award	Previously Miss Georgia Teen USA 1983 3rd runner-up at Miss Teen USA 1983
Hawaii	Luana Alapa	26	Honolulu	Miss Island International	Vocal, "South Sea Sadie"			Mother of Miss Hawaii Teen USA 2015, Kyla Hee
Idaho	Holly Hill	20	Meridian	Miss Meridian	Vocal, "The Music and the Mirror" from A Chorus Line			
Illinois	Cindi Hodgkins	22	Schaumburg	Miss Chicago	Vocal Medley, "My Man" & "But the World Goes Round"		Non-finalist Talent Award	
Indiana	Sheila Stephen	23	Unionville	Miss Hoosier Hills	Country Vocal, "Only You"		Non-finalist Talent Award	
Iowa	Robin Wolfram	24	Davenport	Miss Scott County	Popular Vocal, "Only You"			
Kansas	Sherri Lee Mayer	26	Brewster	Miss Harvey County	Dramatic Interpretation, "Clear Glass Marbles" from Talking With...			
Kentucky	Elizabeth McDowell	21	Prospect	Miss Jefferson County	Semi-classical Vocal, "Falling in Love with Love"			
Louisiana	Patricia Brant	23	Monroe	Miss Red River Valley	Ventriloquism, "Arizona Yodeler" & "Row, Row, Row Your Boat"	1st runner-up	Preliminary Talent Award	
Maine	Laurie Wathen	25	Fort Fairfield	Miss Northern Aroostook	Piano, "Symphony No. 9" by Ludwig van Beethoven		Non-finalist Talent Award	
Maryland	Tamara Walker	21	Kingsville	Miss Montgomery County	Vocal, "Don't Rain on My Parade"	Top 10		
Massachusetts	Aurelie McCarthy	24	East Boston	Miss East Boston	Marimba, "Hava Nagila," "William Tell Overture," & "Joplin on Wood"		Non-finalist Talent Award	
Michigan	Kaye Lani Rae Rafko	23	Monroe	Miss Monroe County	Hawaiian-Tahitian Dance	Winner	Preliminary Lifestyle & Fitness Award	
Minnesota	Katherine Killen	20	Owatonna	Miss Owatonna	Vocal, "Tonight"			
Mississippi	Toni Seawright	23	Moss Point	Miss Mississippi University for Women	Popular Vocal, "I'm Going All the Way"	4th runner-up		First African American to be crowned Miss Mississippi
Missouri	Robin Elizabeth Riley	25	Columbia	Miss Columbia	Ballet, "Overture" from Funny Girl	Top 10		Previously Miss Missouri USA 1983
Montana	Julie Reil	19	Miles City	Miss Missoula County	Vocal, "Being Alive" from Company		Dr. David B. Allman Medical Scholarship	
Nebraska	Mindee Zimmerman	23	Norfolk	Miss Platte Valley	Vocal, "People"			
Nevada	Stacie James	23	Las Vegas	Miss Las Vegas	Vocal, "On My Own" from Les Miserables	2nd runner-up	Preliminary Talent Award	
New Hampshire	Kristen Gamans	23	Manchester	Miss New Hampshire College	Gymnastics Character Dance			
New Jersey	Robin Lange	22	Medford	Miss Burlington County	Dramatic Monologue			
New Mexico	Becky Birdwell	25	Hobbs	Miss Tucumcari	Ballet			
(New York (state)) New York	Alice Knisley	21	Staten Island	Miss Metropolitan New York City	Vocal Medley			
North Carolina	Lori Boggs	26	Kannapolis	Miss Cabarrus County	Popular Vocal, "You Don't Have to Say You Love Me"			Previously Miss North Carolina USA 1980
North Dakota	Susan Campbell	20	Grand Forks	Miss Grand Forks	Lyrical Dance			
Ohio	Susan Kay Johnson	22	Columbus	Miss Canton	Vocal, "Believe"			
Oklahoma	Leesa Cornett	20	Newcastle	Miss Norman	Vocal, "If He Walked Into My Life" from Mame		Non-finalist Talent Award	
Oregon	Tamara Fazzolari	21	Portland	Miss Portland	Tap Dance			Mother of Miss Oregon 2015, Ali Wallace
Pennsylvania	Katarina Sitaris	24	Wilkes-Barre	Miss Wilkes-Barre/Scranton	Classical Vocal, "Quando me'n vo" from La boheme		Cavalier Scholarship	
Rhode Island	Cherilynn Cusick	21	Providence	Miss Providence County	Contemporary Ballet			
South Carolina	Nancy Humphries	21	Myrtle Beach	Miss Myrtle Beach	Piano, "The Stars and Stripes Forever"		Preliminary Lifestyle & Fitness Award	Former co-host of Access Hollywood Current co-anchor of Entertainment Tonight
South Dakota	Najla Ghazi	19	Brookings	Miss South Dakota State University	Oral Interpretations			
Tennessee	Regina Athnos	23	Clarksville	Miss Tennessee Peach Festival	Flute Medley, "I'll Fly Away" & "Amazing Grace"			
Texas	Rita Jo Thompson	22	Lufkin	Miss Greenville	Jazz Dance, "An American Trilogy"	Top 10		
Utah	Marianne Bales	21	Orem	Miss Orem	Lyrical Dance & Vocal, "Let Me Dance For You"			
Vermont	Susan Bora	26	Colchester		Percussion, "Opus D Opus - The Tonight Show Theme"			
Virginia	Heidi Lammi	26	Alexandria	Miss Northern Virginia	Ballet en Pointe, Grande Tarantelle	Top 10		
(Washington (state)) Washington	Sharon Dean	21	Issaquah	Miss Issaquah	Vocal Medley			
West Virginia	Saundra Patton	22	Morgantown	Miss North Central	Variety Act			
Wisconsin	Maria Kim	20	Shorewood	Miss Madison	Classical Piano, "Fantaisie-Impromptu"		Preliminary Talent Award Non-finalist Talent Award	Previously Miss Wisconsin National Teenager 1983 Previously Miss Wisconsin Teen USA 1985
Wyoming	Terrilynn Hove	21	Casper	Miss Laramie	Vocal Medley			
