= Angela Perez Baraquio =

American beauty queen (born 1976)

Angela Perez Baraquio Grey
- Born: Angela Perez Baraquio; June 1, 1976 (age 50); Honolulu, Hawaii, U.S.
- Other name: Angela Perez Baraquio Grey
- Education: University of Hawaiʻi at Mānoa
- Occupations: Educator, media personality, dancer, musician, business owner
- Known for: First Asian American and Filipino American Miss America
- Title: Miss Hawaii 2000; Miss America 2001
- Term: October 14, 2000 – September 22, 2001
- Predecessor: Heather French
- Successor: Katie Harman
- Spouse: Tinifuloa Grey (m. 2002)
- Children: 4
- Website: angelaperezbaraquio.com

Angela Perez Baraquio Grey (born June 1, 1976), known professionally by her birth name of Angela Perez Baraquio, is an American educator. She was crowned Miss America 2001 on October 14, 2000, in Atlantic City, New Jersey, becoming the first Asian American, first Filipino American, and first teacher ever to win the pageant.

A politically conservative, anti-abortion Catholic, Baraquio has been publicly active in supporting various Republican politicians and in speaking out against abortion. She is also an educator whose platform as Miss America was character education. Since 2004, Baraquio has co-hosted the Hawaiian television show Living Local with the Baraquios.

== Early life and education ==
She is the eighth of ten children (sixth of seven girls) born to an immigrant couple from Pangasinan, Philippines. One of her sisters is Hawaiian media personality Bernadette Baraquio Hamada whose husband is Hawaiian conservative talk radio show host and columnist, Rick Hamada.

Baraquio graduated from Moanalua High School in June 1994 magna cum laude. After graduation, she attended the University of Hawaiʻi at Mānoa where she graduated in May 1999 with a bachelor's degree in elementary education with an emphasis on speech.

Baraquio earned her master's degree in educational administration from the University of Hawaii in December 2004. During her year as Miss America in 2001, Baraquio's platform was character education.

== Pageant participation ==
Baraquio was Miss Hawaii 2000. Subsequently, she was crowned Miss America 2001 on October 14, 2000, in Atlantic City, New Jersey, becoming the first Asian American, first Filipino American, and first teacher ever to win the pageant.

She helped host the Miss America 2002 pageant.

She has appeared as a panelist on MTV's Pageant School: Becoming Miss America and on the conservative talk show, Hannity, of the Fox News Channel.

== Career ==
From August 1999 to June 2000, Baraquio was a faculty member at Holy Family Catholic Academy in the Salt Lake subdivision of Honolulu. She taught physical education, was athletic director and coached basketball, volleyball and track. Baraquio was also choir director of the historic St. Augustine Church in Waikiki.

In 2015 Baraquio was appointed principal of St. Anthony of Padua School in Gardena, California.

Baraquio has worked as a celebrity spokesperson for First Hawaiian Bank, First Hawaiian Center, and the Four Seasons hotel in Hawaii. Baraquio and her family live in Anaheim, California.

== Political views and activity ==
In 2001, Baraquio participated as Miss America in the National Prayer Breakfast in Washington, D.C., and was acknowledged by President George W. Bush in his remarks. Bush said, "Angela, it's wonderful to see you again. Thank you for your testimony and your beauty and your grace." In June 2006, President Bush appointed Baraquio to the President's Council on Service and Civic Participation, where she served until November 2008.

In 2003, Baraquio hosted a series of television shows for Governor Linda Lingle (R-Hawaii), called Talk Story with Your Administration, showcasing activities and individuals of the Lingle Administration.

She was one of Senator Sam Brownback's (R-Kansas) earliest and most prominent supporters in the 2008 Republican presidential primary season. She formally joined the Brownback campaign December 14, 2006, and served on his presidential exploratory committee, where her main task was promoting the conservative Kansas senator in her native Hawaii. She said she was drawn to the senator's strong opposition to abortion. Baraquio said, "As a Catholic, I am proud to support this wonderful man who believes in the sanctity of every human life." On January 20, 2007, Baraquio introduced Brownback at his presidential campaign kick-off event in Kansas. In her remarks, Baraquio said Brownback "is a man we can trust to take our values to the White House." Brownback withdrew from the presidential race on October 19, 2007, before any primary contests.

Baraquio remains active in speaking out against abortion. CMG Booking an agency which specializes in booking prominent conservative Catholics for public speaking engagements, books Baraquio for events. On her page on CMG's website, Baraquio lists "Pro-life issues" among her speaking topics.

== Media appearances ==
- Appeared as a guest on the Late Show with David Letterman
- Appeared as a panelist on ESPN's 2 Minute Drill
- Appeared on Behind Closed Doors with Joan Lunden on A&E
- Game show participant on
  - Wheel of Fortune
  - Hollywood Squares
  - Pyramid

Awards and achievements
Preceded by Heather French	Miss America; 2001	Succeeded by Katie Harman
Preceded by Candes Gentry	Miss Hawaii; 2000	Succeeded by Billie Takaki
