= Kelly Jones (Miss Alabama) =

- Born: 1976 or 1977 (age 49–50)
- Other name: Kelly Carr
- Occupation: Educator
- Spouse: Benjamin Carr (m. 2003)
- Beauty pageant titleholder
- Title: Miss Lake Wedowee 1998; Miss Samford 1999; Miss Jefferson County 2000; Miss Homewood Area 2001; Miss Alabama 2001
- Major competition: Miss America 2002

Kelly Jones Carr (born 1976/1977) is an American educator and beauty pageant titleholder from Birmingham, Alabama, who was named Miss Alabama 2001.

== Career ==
In high school, Jones was a contestant in Mississippi's Junior Miss. In 1998, she was crowned Miss Lake Wedowee and placed at Miss Alabama that year. While a senior at Samford University in Birmingham, Alabama, Jones won the title of Miss Samford 1999. The next year she was crowned Miss Jefferson County 2000.

Jones was selected as Miss Homewood Area 2001 then, in early 2001, Jones was diagnosed with toxic shock syndrome, a potentially fatal illness caused by a bacterial toxin. The antibiotic treatment for this caused most of her hair to fall out just two months before the Miss Alabama pageant in June.

Jones' preliminary competition talent for Miss Alabama was playing classical piano. Her platform was "Boys and Girls Clubs: Be a Peer Role Model". Jones won the state competition on Saturday, June 16, 2001, when she received her crown from outgoing Miss Alabama titleholder Jana Sanderson. After winning, Jones announced she would use the scholarship money to pursue a graduate degree in music education. As Miss Alabama, her activities included public appearances across the state of Alabama.

Jones was Alabama's representative at the Miss America 2002 pageant in Atlantic City, New Jersey. Her competition talent was a classical piano performance of Frédéric Chopin's Ballade No. 1. Jones was not one of the finalists for the Miss America title. Her reign as Miss Alabama continued until Scarlotte Deupree was crowned on June 15, 2002.

== Personal life ==
Jones is a Birmingham, Alabama, native and spent part of her high school years at Mountain Brook High School. She is a 1995 graduate of Lamar High School in Meridian, Mississippi. Majoring in piano performance, Jones graduated from Samford University with a bachelor's degree in December 1999. While at Samford, she was inducted into the Kappa Chapter of the Alpha Delta Pi sorority. She then enrolled in a graduate program at The University of Alabama studying music education.

Before becoming Miss Alabama in 2001, Jones worked as a fragrance model, a waitress, and a piano teacher. After graduating, she owned and operated a music academy in Augusta, Georgia. In 2008, she was hired as the administrator for the Gadsden Community School for the Arts in Gadsden, Alabama.

Her parents are Jerry Wilson Jones and Cynthia Perkins Jones. During her reign as Miss Alabama, her father worked for a department store and her mother was a homemaker. She is an only child. Jones was raised Southern Baptist. On August 9, 2003, she married Benjamin Matthew Carr. Her wedding was featured in the 2004 edition of Alabama Weddings.

Awards and achievements
Preceded by Jana Sanderson	Miss Alabama; 2001	Succeeded by Scarlotte Deupree
