= James J. Brady (physicist) =

American physicist and professor

James Joseph Brady
- Born: November 24, 1904; Oregon City, Oregon
- Died: May 3, 1993 (aged 88); Longview, Texas
- Education: Reed College; Indiana University; University of California, Berkeley
- Awards: 1957 – American Physical Society General Fellowship
- Scientific career
- Fields: Physics
- Workplaces: University of California, Berkeley; Saint Louis University; Oregon State University
- Thesis: A quantitative study of the photo-electric properties of alkali metal films (1931)
- Doctoral advisor: E. O. Lawrence

James Joseph Brady (1904–1993) was a physicist on the faculty of Oregon State University and a Fellow of the American Institute of Physics.

== Early life and education ==
James Joseph Brady was born in Oregon City, Oregon, November 24, 1904, the son of Edward A. Brady and Mary E. (née Riley) Brady. He graduated in 1923 from Oregon City High School, and completed his baccalaureate degree in 1927 at Reed College. Supervised by Arthur Lee Foley, he wrote his 1928 M.S. thesis, Polarization of Radio Waves, at Indiana University.

Brady earned a Ph.D. at the University of California, Berkeley, with his 1931 dissertation, A quantitative study of the photo-electric properties of alkali metal films, advised by E. O. Lawrence. He was then recruited for a faculty position at Saint Louis University by Father Macelwane, but Lawrence persuaded Macelwane to pay Brady as a research associate at Berkeley until the beginning of the fall term of 1932 at St. Louis.

On September 3, 1932, Brady wed Mary Contratto in Bakersfield and they moved to Missouri.

== Career ==
In August 1932, Brady had been preparing to study, "the ionization probability of high-speed protons in nitrogen using the 11-inch cyclotron" at Berkeley. Brady wrote that he had received a telegram from Lawrence, who was at the East Coast on his honeymoon, telling Brady to immediately stop what he was doing— because Cockroft and Walton had "disintegrated lithium with high-speed protons". Lawrence asked him if he could duplicate their work, using the cyclotron. Brady was joined by two vacationing Yale grad students, Donald Cooksey and Franz Kurie, who built a geiger counter that could be adjusted to detect alpha particles.

Brady left Berkeley to be married in Oregon, and on October 1,1932, Lawrence published results, acknowledging Brady, Cooksey, and Kurie:

These experiments were begun by Dr. James A. Brady who was joined later by Drs. Donald Cooksey and F. N. D. Kurie. They were successful in detecting radiations from the bombarded lithium fluoride but unfortunately because of insufficient available time had to abandon the experiments which we have carried on. We are much indebted to them for their participation in the earlier stage of the work...

— E.O.Lawrence, M. Stanley Livingston, and Milton G. White

From 1932 to 1937, Brady was an assistant professor at Saint Louis University, where he published articles on photoelectric sensitization of potassium and the energy distribution of photoelectrons in potassium film.

Brady joined the faculty of Oregon State as an assistant professor in 1937, and in 1939 he was promoted to associate professor there. The departmental history records "gaseous electronics" as his principle field of interest in that period. From 1941–1945, Brady went on leave of absence for civilian war service to the Massachusetts Institute of Technology Radiation Laboratory, as an assistant leader of the antenna group, researching and developing microwave radar. He was promoted to professor upon his return to Oregon Stae in 1945. In 1952–1953, Brady developed and taught a new graduate level course, "Physics of the Solid State".

In 1954 the college's physics faculty brought online Oregon's first cyclotron, the culmination of several years' efforts. Brady and Richard Dempster, who was another UC Berkeley alum, conceived the 37-inch cyclotron, with encouragement from UC Berkeley's Radiation Laboratory, in the form of donated steel parts of the magnet. They also had financial support of state funds from the OSU's President Strand, and they secured matching funds from the U. S. Atomic Energy Commission for construction and ongoing research. During 1955–1956 Brady served as acting department chair.

In his sabbatical during Spring term 1967, Brady visited universities in Europe and the Middle East.

In 1971, Brady and Larry Hunte, director of OSU's computer center, were awarded a $1690,000 grant from the National Science Foundation to "develop computer graphic techniques that will enrich and enhance the quality of undergraduate science education".

"James J. Brady" was listed as a professor emeritus of physics at Oregon State University in May, 1972.

Brady participated in a 1973 three-month project at the U. S. Navy Electronics Laboratory Center at San Diego, "to develop the technique of carrying conversation through glass fiber by means of light". Brady was involved designing, constructing, and testing equipment to reduce the system's light loss.

James J. Brady died on May 3, 1993 in Longview, Texas.

== Selected publications ==
- Brady, James J. (September 1, 1932). "The Photoelectric Properties of Alkali Metal Films as a Function of their Thickness". Physical Review. 41 (5): 613–626. doi:10.1103/PhysRev.41.613.
- Brady, James J. (November 1, 1934). "Energy Distribution of Photoelectrons as a Function of the Thickness of a Potassium Film". Physical Review. 46 (9): 768–772. doi:10.1103/PhysRev.46.768.
- Brady, James J.; Jacobsmeyer, Vincent P. (May 1, 1936). "Photoelectric Properties of Sodium Films on Aluminum". Physical Review. 49 (9): 670–675. doi:10.1103/PhysRev.49.670.
- Brady, James J.; Rochel, Joseph H. (November 1, 1936). "Photoelectric Sensitization of Potassium by Means of Hydrogen". Physical Review. 50 (9): 870. doi:10.1103/PhysRev.50.870.
- Brady, James J.; Moore, William H. (February 1, 1939). "Actinoelectric Effects in Tartaric Acid Crystals". Physical Review. 55 (3): 308–311. doi:10.1103/PhysRev.55.308.
- Brady, James J. (May 1, 1940). "A Method for Opening a Tube in a Vacuum". Review of Scientific Instruments. 11 (5): 181. doi:10.1063/1.1751674. ISSN 0034-6748.
- Skinner, John G.; Brady, James J. (March 1, 1963). "Net Frequency of Ionization in Oxygen". Physical Review. 129 (5): 2087–2090. doi:10.1103/PhysRev.129.2087.
- Tynes, A. R.; Brady, J. J. (January 1964). "Description of Helium-Plasma Rate Processes by Means of Simultaneous Differential Rate Equations". IEEE Transactions on Nuclear Science. 11 (1): 231. doi:10.1109/TNS.1964.4323350. ISSN 1558-1578.

== Recognition ==
- 1957 – American Physical Society General Fellowship

== See also ==
- Cyclotron motion
- Cyclotron radiation
- Electron cyclotron resonance
