= CC Barber =

American beauty pageant titleholder

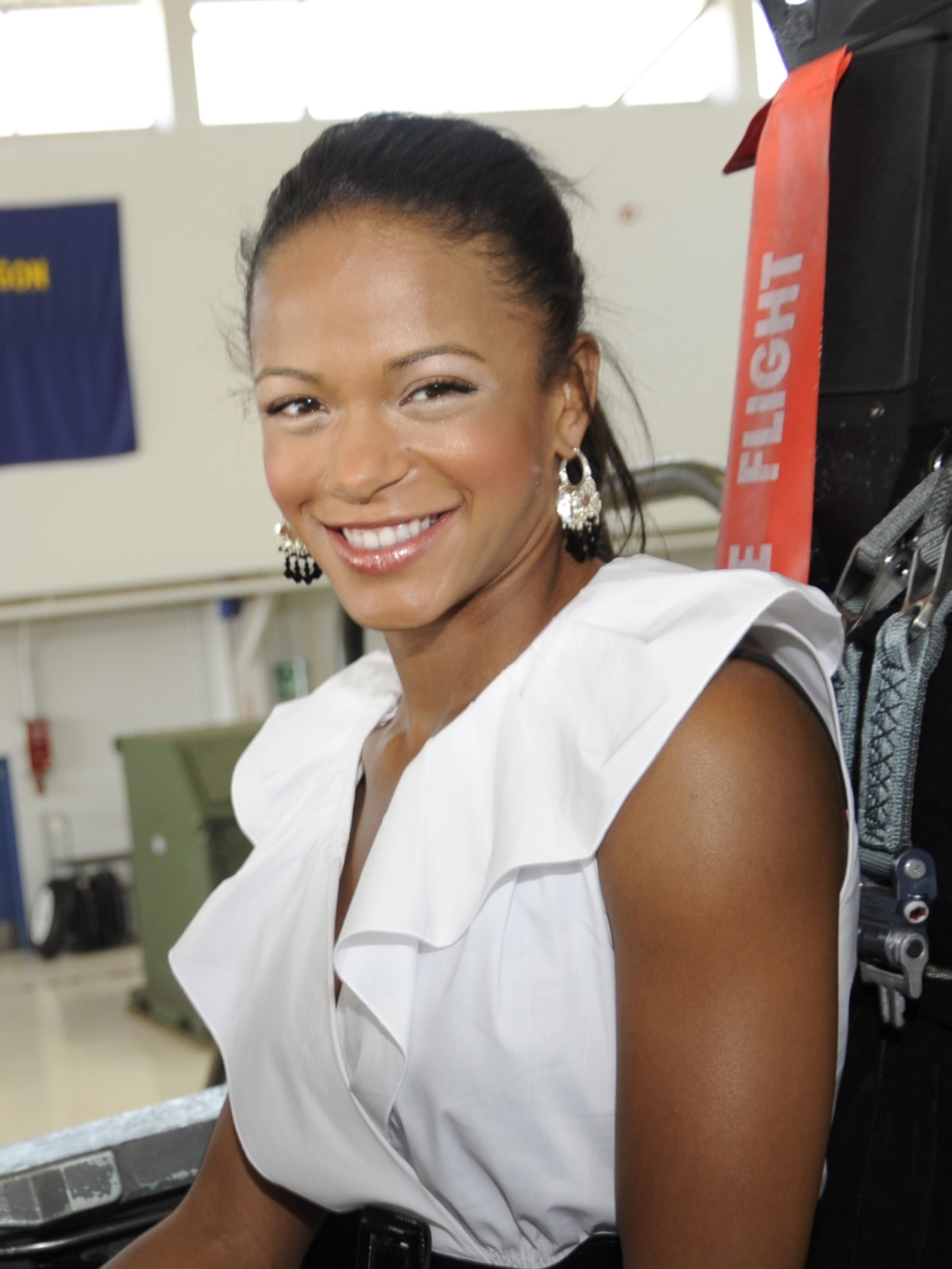
- Born: 1986 or 1987 (age 39–40)
- Education: Samuel Merritt University
- Beauty pageant titleholder
- Title: Miss Columbia County 2006; Miss Three Rivers 2008; Miss Tri Valley 2009; Miss Oregon 2009
- Major competition: Miss America 2010 (Top 15)

CC Barber is an American beauty pageant titleholder from Scappoose, Oregon, who was crowned Miss Oregon 2009. She competed for the Miss America 2010 title in January 2010 and placed in the Top 15 semi-finalists.

== Pageant career ==
=== Early pageants ===
In 2006, Barber won the Miss Columbia County 2006 title. She competed in the 2006 Miss Oregon pageant with the platform "Aiding Children and Families of Foster Care/Improving the Foster Care System" and a dance performance in the talent portion of the competition. She was named runner-up to winner Donilee McGinnis.

Barber did not compete in the 2007 Miss Oregon pageant.

In 2008, Barber won the Miss Three Rivers 2008 title. She competed in the 2008 Miss Oregon pageant with the platform "Friends of the Children – Revolutionary Mentoring for High-Risk Youth" and a dance performance in the talent portion of the competition.

=== Miss Oregon 2009 ===
In 2009, Barber was crowned Miss Tri Valley 2009. She entered the Miss Oregon pageant in early July 2009 as one of 24 qualifiers for the state title. Barber's competition talent was a dance performance to "Bleeding Love" by Leona Lewis. Her platform was "Friends of the Children – Revolutionary Mentoring for High-Risk Youth".

Barber won the competition on Saturday, July 11, 2009, when she received her crown from outgoing Miss Oregon titleholder Danijela Krstić. She earned more than $12,500 in scholarship money and other prizes from the state pageant. As Miss Oregon, her activities included public appearances across the state of Oregon. Barber's reign continued until she crowned her successor, Stephenie Steers, Miss Oregon 2010 on July 10, 2010.

=== Vying for Miss America ===
Barber was Oregon's representative at the Miss America 2010 pageant in Las Vegas, Nevada, in January 2010. Barber was placed in the Top 15 semi-finalists by a vote among the pageant contestants in addition to those semi-finalists selected by the judges. She was eliminated from the pageant after the swimsuit competition. Barber earned a $4,000 scholarship award as a Top 15 semi-finalist plus an additional $1,000 award for winning the Preliminary Lifestyle & Fitness in Swimsuit competition.

== Personal life and education ==
Barber is a native of Scappoose, Oregon, and a 2005 graduate of Scappoose High School. From the time she was five months old, Barber was raised by her grandmother, Dona Hadley.

After high school, Barber enrolled at Mills College in Oakland, California, to pursue a degree in nursing. She transferred to Samuel Merritt University where she earned a bachelor's degree in nursing, graduating in 2010.

Awards and achievements
Preceded by Danijela Krstić	Miss Oregon; 2009	Succeeded by Stephenie Steers
