= New Unionville, Indiana =

- Unincorporated community
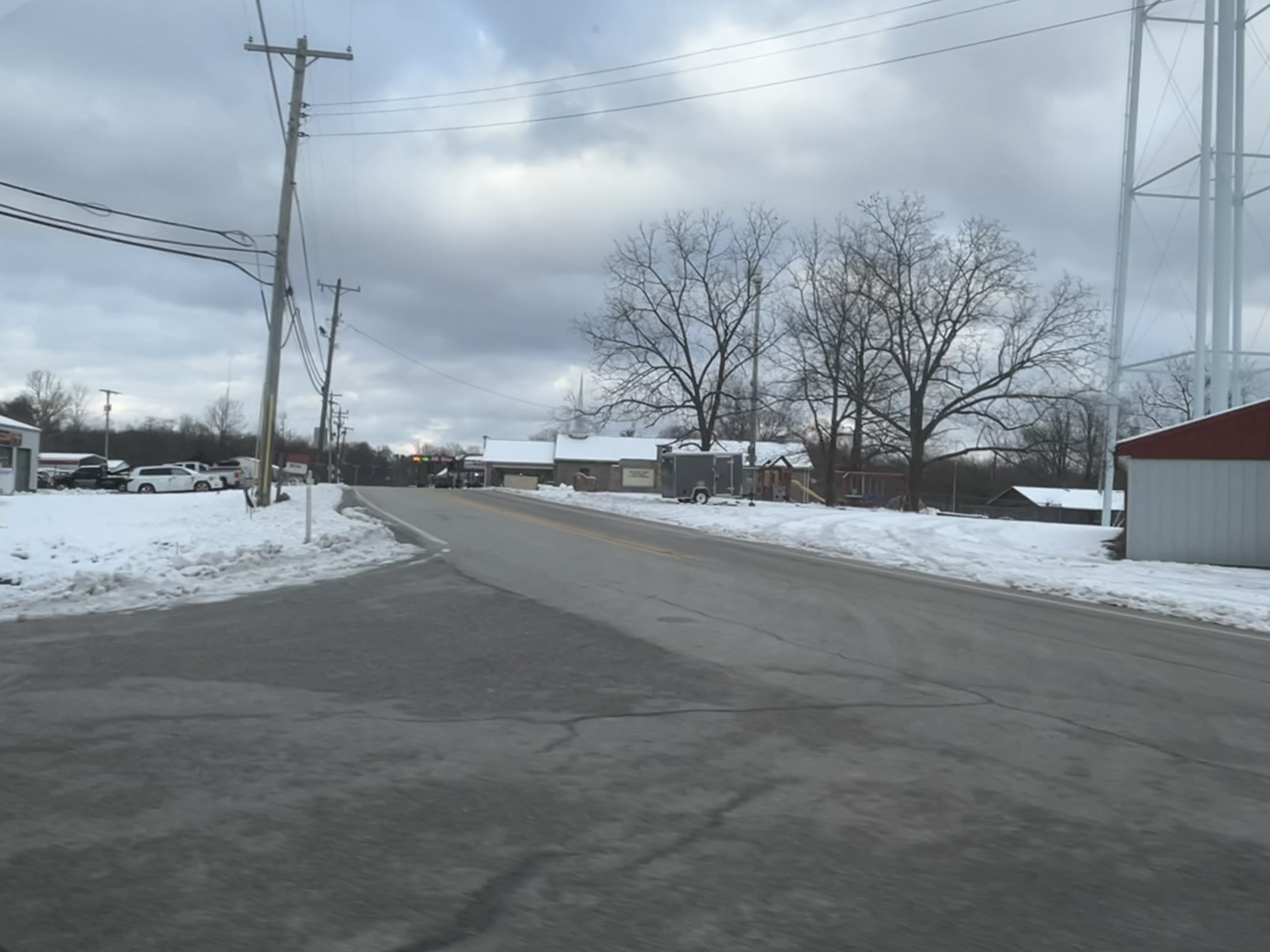
- Downtown New Unionville

- Location within Indiana Location within the United States
- Coordinates: 39°12′40″N 86°27′44″W
- Country: United States
- State: Indiana
- County: Monroe
- Township: Benton
- Elevation: 879 ft (268 m)
- Time zone: UTC-5 (Eastern (EST))
  - Summer (DST): UTC-4 (EDT)
- ZIP code: 47408
- Area codes: 812, 930
- GNIS feature ID: 440120

New Unionville is an unincorporated community in Benton Township, Monroe County, in the U.S. state of Indiana.

== History ==
New Unionville was founded in 1906.

== Geography ==
New Unionville is located near the city of Bloomington. Indiana State Road 45 and the Indiana Rail Road pass through the community. There is a Baptist church and a recycling center in the area.
