= Lynette Boggs =

American politician (born 1963)

Lynette Boggs-Perez (born 1963) is a former Republican politician in Clark County, Nevada, and Bexar County, Texas, and the winner of the Miss Oregon 1989 scholarship pageant. She went by the name of Lynette Boggs McDonald for most of her political career and returned to her maiden name after a 2007 divorce. She remarried in 2017 and both personally and professionally is known as Lynette Boggs-Perez.

== Genealogy ==
Boggs is a descendant of Edward Reginald Hodgson Sr., born in Newcastle Upon Tyne, Northumberland, England in 1816. Hodgson's family immigrated to the United States in 1836, settling in Illinois, and eventually making Athens, Georgia, the family home. Hodgson and his brothers were plantation owners and carriage makers. Boggs, her siblings, and mother are direct descendants of Hodgson and a slave named Phillis, born in 1831. The maternal side of her family has resided in Athens for more than 180 years.

== Early life ==
Boggs is the sixth of eight children and the third to graduate from law school. In the seventh grade she was junior high president at her school in West Germany. Most of her childhood was spent in Germany and Italy. In high school, she was president of her sophomore, junior and senior classes. She graduated from the University of Notre Dame in 1985 with a degree in business. She worked as director of marketing and admissions at the now-defunct Merritt Davis Business College in Eugene, Oregon. In 1989, she was crowned Miss Oregon and began a two-year journalism career.

At the Eugene Register-Guard newspaper, Boggs concentrated on police and the courts. One article she wrote for the Register-Guard was about a 1990 contestant for Miss Oregon, focusing on the fact that the contestant (Lisa Verch Fletcher, a future television news journalist) was an animal advocate.

While at the Portland Associated Press bureau, she wrote about government and contributed as a back-up sports writer. She also covered government and the courts at the Times Record News in Wichita Falls, Texas. She moved to Las Vegas in 1991.

== Education ==
Boggs is a 1985 graduate of the University of Notre Dame where she received a Bachelor of Business Administration degree from the Mendoza College of Business. At Notre Dame, she was a member of the Liturgical Choir and a cantor at the Basilica of the Sacred Heart on that campus. She was twice a member of the Fighting Irish cheerleading squad.

Boggs attended the University of Oregon Graduate School of Journalism for two years in Eugene, Oregon. Ultimately, she received a master's degree in Public Administration, cum laude, from the University of Nevada, Las Vegas in 1998. She is a member of Pi Alpha Alpha National Honor Society for Public Administration and Public Affairs.

Boggs has resided in the state of Texas since 2008 and is an honor graduate of St. Mary's University School of Law in San Antonio. She received her Doctor of Jurisprudence degree in May 2012 and was honored by the Faculty Advocacy Committee as the recipient of the 2012 Judge Jack B. Miller Award. She was a Dean's Scholar and served as an Associate Editor of the St. Mary's Law Journal. She received a Pro Bono Certificate at her graduation for having donated more than 700 hours of free legal services to residents who could not afford lawyers in San Antonio and on the Texas-Mexico border. Boggs was one of 10 graduating law students inducted into the National Order of Barristers, a national organization that recognizes law students who have distinguished themselves in courtroom advocacy and appellate brief writing.

== Political history ==
Boggs was appointed to a fill a vacant seat on the Las Vegas City Council on June 28, 1999. She was elected in the Ward 2 primary election, receiving 70 percent of the vote. Under Nevada election law, a person can be elected to a position in a primary election, without the need to run in a general election if certain conditions are met.

Boggs was a Republican candidate for the U.S. Congress in 2002, running against Shelley Berkley in Nevada's First Congressional District. She lost, had she won she would have been the only Republican African-American female in the House. She was featured in a Washington Post opinion piece by national columnist George Will. Among those who hosted fundraisers and/or meet-and-greets on her behalf included President George H.W. Bush, 41st President of the United States, Ambassador Alan Keyes, U.S. Senator Orrin Hatch and U.S. Congressman John Boehner.

On April 20, 2004, Boggs joined the Clark County Commission. She was appointed to the position by Governor Kenny Guinn to fill the seat for District F previously held by Mark James. She was elected to that position in November 2004, defeating Nevada Assemblyman David Goldwater.

Boggs was investigated by the Nevada Ethics Commission in 2005 for a complaint alleging that she tried to use her political influence to save her husband's government job. The allegations proved false.

On June 5, 2007, Boggs was the subject of an arrest warrant over charges that she committed four felonies related to her reelection bid in 2006. These warrants were quashed by the Chief Judge Kathy Hardcastle, of the Clark County District Court. The charges, according to Boggs and numerous commentators, were "political payback" rooted in her vocal opposition to a 40% pay raise for police officers in Las Vegas and because of her former service on the Board of Directors of Station Casinos, a non-union hotel corporation. She was originally sued in civil court by both the Police Protective Association and the Las Vegas Culinary Union. Both unions were key endorsers of the 2006 re-election effort of Clark County District Attorney David Roger.

In 2008, two of the felony charges were dismissed by Judge Donald Mosley. In 2009, she accepted an Alford plea to a single gross misdemeanor to resolve the case, maintaining her innocence throughout the ordeal. This sole misdemeanor was dismissed and expunged.

As a resident of Texas, Boggs was elected unopposed as a precinct chair for the Bexar County Republican Party in 2016. After withdrawing her candidacy for a 2018 judicial race, she was unanimously appointed and served as Legal Counsel for the local Republican party in San Antonio. In May 2018, she beat three opponents and was elected the District 7 Trustee for the Judson Independent School District in Live Oak, Texas. She has been elected in two states - Nevada and Texas.

== Legal career ==
Boggs has worked as a judicial extern to Chief Judge Piper Griffin of the Orleans Parish Civil District Court in New Orleans (2010) and as a judicial intern to Justice Rebecca Simmons of the Texas Fourth Court of Appeals (2011). She has also served as a law clerk in the Trial Division of the Public Defender Service of the District of Columbia (2011).

Boggs has taught both Constitutional Law and Criminal Law at the college level. She co-wrote "The Written and Unwritten Rules of Civil District Practice" with the Honorable Michael Mery of the 37th Civil District Court of Bexar County.

In 2013, Boggs established Lynette Boggs Law & Mediations (lynetteboggs.com) in San Antonio. Her law practice is devoted to family law, child welfare, and juvenile justice in eight counties throughout south Texas, including Bexar County. She has tried both criminal and civil cases before juries through south Texas. Her mediation practice was established in 2016 with a focus on resolving family law, CPS, governmental and neighborhood disputes.

Boggs and her husband relocated to Little Rock, Arkansas in 2020. She made Arkansas history as the first black prosecutor in White County, Arkansas, a county founded in 1836. She was appointed the Area 6 Director for Pulaski County, in 2022 directing the child welfare efforts for the largest county in the state. She returned to private law practice in 2023, establishing Boggs-Perez Law PLLC. She has served as the Chief Deputy City Attorney for the City of Little Rock since March 2024.

Boggs maintains professional memberships in the Arkansas Bar Association, State Bar of Arkansas, State Bar of Texas, the San Antonio Black Lawyers Association (SABLA), and the W. Harold Flowers Law Society in Arkansas. She was one of two recipients of the 2018 FUTURE LEGENDS IN THE LAW AWARD, presented at the annual gala of the San Antonio Black Lawyers Association.

Lynette Boggs was the 2013 Commencement Speaker at the Tyrannus Washington School of the Arts in Schertz, Texas. Since 2016, she has served as the coach for the Judson High School mock trial team in its annual appearances in the Texas Mock Trial Competition. On a unanimous vote of the County Executive Committee, she was appointed and ratified as the Legal Counsel of the Republican Party of Bexar County in July 2018.

== Writing career ==
Lynette Boggs is the 1991 recipient of the Katie Award for Excellence in News Feature Writing presented by the Press Club of Dallas. She is the author of FINDING GOD IN SIN CITY: A Woman's Journey From Losing It All To Discovering Life's True Riches (HigherLife Publishing).

Political offices
Preceded by Arnie Adamson	Las Vegas City Council; Ward 2; 1999–2004	Succeeded by Steve Wolfson
Preceded by Mark James	Clark County Commission; District F 2004–2006	Succeeded by Susan Brager
