= Benton Township, Monroe County, Indiana =

Benton Township
- Township
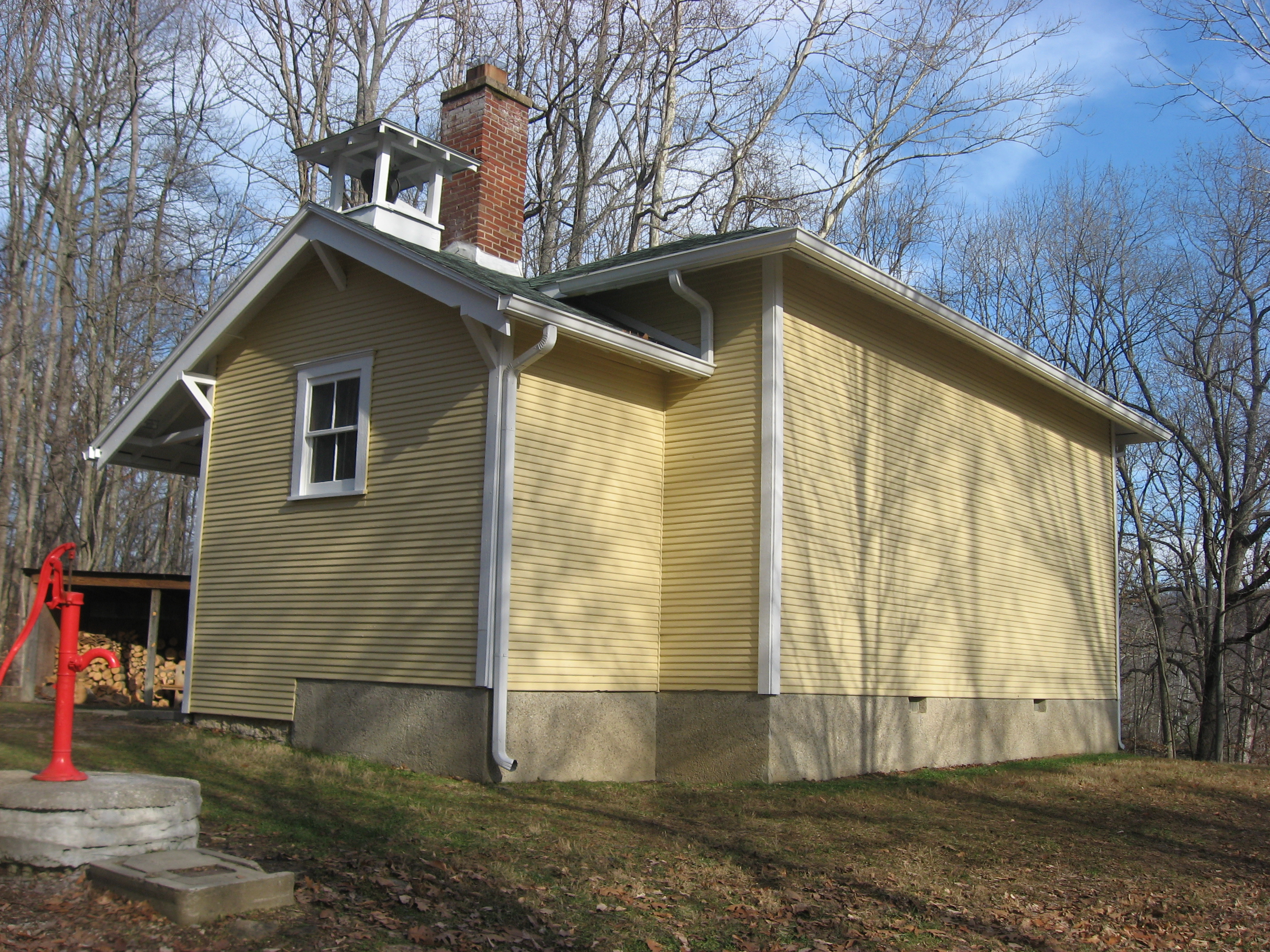
- Honey Creek School, a historic site in the township

- Location in Monroe County
- Coordinates: 39°14′46″N 86°25′30″W
- Country: United States
- State: Indiana
- County: Monroe

Government
  - Type: Indiana township

Area
  - Total: 56.61 sq mi (146.6 km^{2})
  - Land: 54.92 sq mi (142.2 km^{2})
  - Water: 1.69 sq mi (4.4 km^{2}) 2.99%
- Elevation: 830 ft (253 m)

Population (2020)
  - Total: 3,260
  - Density: 61.1/sq mi (23.6/km^{2})
- Time zone: UTC-5 (Eastern (EST))
  - Summer (DST): UTC-4 (EDT)
- ZIP codes: 46151, 47401, 47408, 47468
- Area codes: 812, 930
- GNIS feature ID: 453106
- Website: bentontownshiptrustee.org

Benton Township is one of eleven townships in Monroe County, Indiana, United States. As of the 2010 census, its population was 3,358 and it contained 1,716 housing units.

== History ==
Benton Township was established in 1833. It was named for Thomas Hart Benton, a U.S. Senator from Missouri. Benton township was divided into Marion township to the north and Benton township to the south in August 1845. The current township was formed in January 1916 when Marion township and Benton township merged back together to form a single township.

Honey Creek School was listed on the National Register of Historic Places in 1978.

== Geography ==
According to the 2010 census, the township has a total area of 56.61 square miles (146.6 km^{2}), of which 54.92 square miles (142.2 km^{2}) (or 97.01%) is land and 1.69 square miles (4.4 km^{2}) (or 2.99%) is water.

=== Unincorporated towns ===
- Fleener at 39.282547°N 86.412494°W
- New Unionville at 39.211158°N 86.462218°W
- Unionville at 39.230047°N 86.416105°W

=== Cemeteries ===
The township trustee maintains four cemeteries: Fleener/Richardson, Stepp, Brock, and Taylor/McGowan/Frye.

=== Major highways ===
- Indiana State Road 46

=== Lakes ===
- Beanblossom Lake
- Cherry Lake
- Lazy Lake

== School districts ==
- Monroe County Community School Corporation

== Political districts ==
- Indiana's 9th congressional district
- State House District 60
- State Senate District 40
