= Honey Creek School =

- U.S. National Register of Historic Places
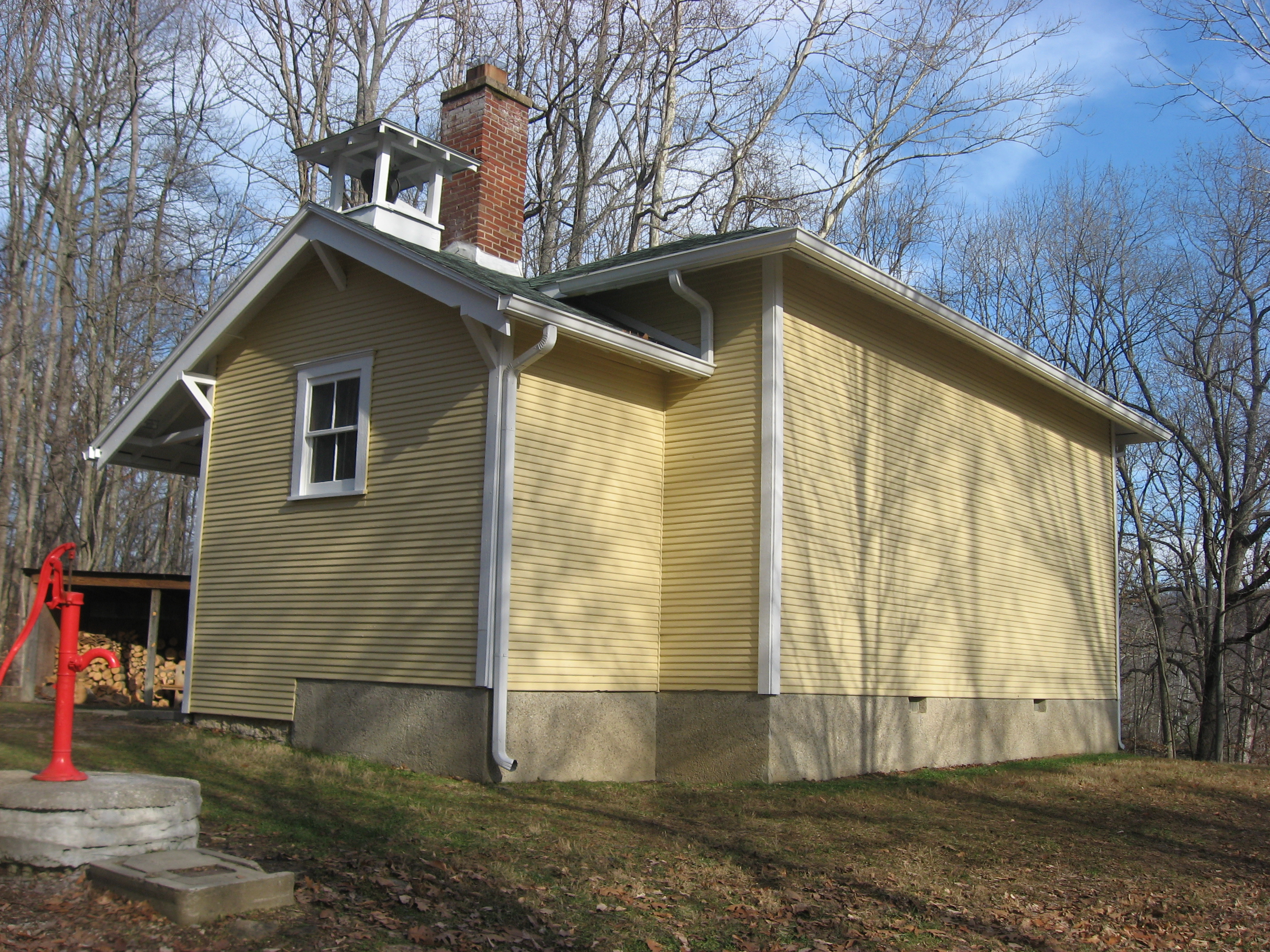
- Honey Creek School, December 2011

- Location within Indiana Location within the United States
- Location: Northeast of Bloomington on Low Gap Rd., Benton Township, Monroe County, Indiana
- Coordinates: 39°17′7″N 86°24′32″W
- Area: 1.8 acres (0.73 ha)
- Built: 1921
- Architect: Lee, Otis; McClary, Joseph A.
- Architectural style: Bungalow/craftsman, Influence
- NRHP reference No.: 78000024
- Added to NRHP: September 20, 1978

Honey Creek School is a historic one-room school building located in Benton Township, Monroe County, Indiana. It was built in 1921, and is a one-story, Bungalow / American Craftsman influenced balloon frame building on a fieldstone foundation. The main section has a hipped roof and a projecting gable roofed entry is topped by a belfry with a pyramidal roof. The school closed in 1945. The building was restored in 1975.

It was listed on the National Register of Historic Places in 1978.
