= Nichole Mead =

American beauty pageant titleholder (born 1988)

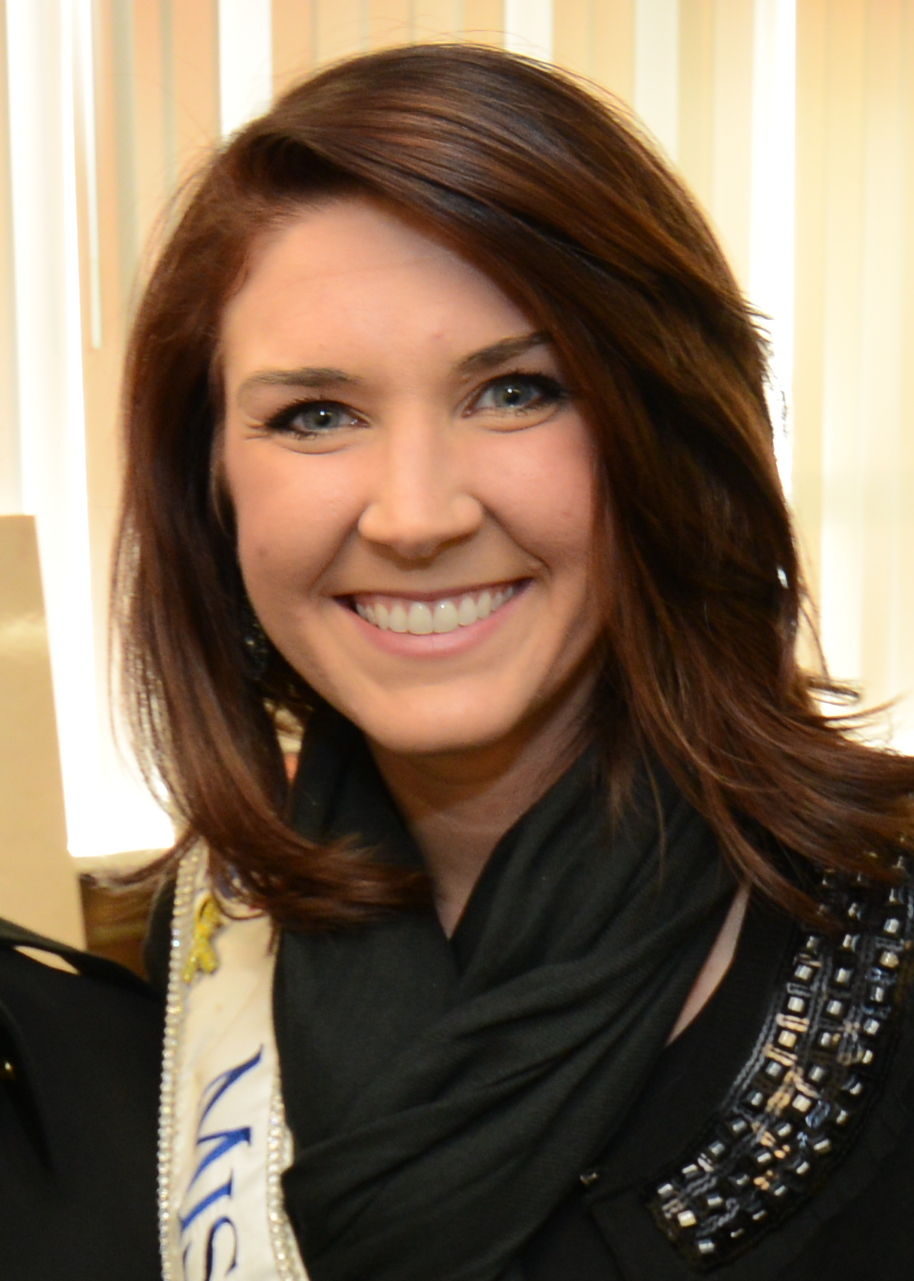
- Nichole Meade, April 2012
- Born: Nichole Renee Mead; March 23, 1988 (age 38)
- Education: University of Oregon
- Beauty pageant titleholder
- Title: Miss Lincoln County 2006; Miss Lane County 2008; Miss University of Oregon 2010; Miss Marion-Polk County 2011; Miss Three Rivers 2012; Miss Oregon 2012
- Major competition: Miss America 2013

Nichole Renee Mead Zahner (born March 23, 1988) is an American beauty pageant titleholder from Newport, Oregon. She was crowned Miss Oregon 2012 after pageant officials discovered that the original winner did not meet state residency requirements. Mead competed at the Miss America 2013 pageant in January 2013 but was not a semi-finalist for the national title.

== Pageant career ==
=== Early pageants ===
In 2006, Mead won the Miss Lincoln County 2006 title. She was one of 24 qualifiers for the 2006 Miss Oregon pageant and performed a lyrical dance routine to the Andrew Lloyd Webber song "The Phantom of the Opera" from the musical of the same name in the talent portion of the competition. She was not a Top-10 semi-finalist for the state title. In 2007, Mead did not win a qualifying local pageant title and so did not participate in the 2007 Miss Oregon pageant.

On April 5, 2008, Mead won the Miss Lane County 2008 title and earned $4,000 in scholarship money and other prizes. She competed in the 2008 Miss Oregon pageant with the platform "Promoting Awareness of the Dangers Caused by Drinking and Driving" and a lyrical dance performance to the Christina Aguilera song "Hurt" in the talent portion of the competition. She was named a Top-10 semi-finalist for the state title and earned a $1,000 scholarship prize. Mead did not participate in the 2009 Miss Oregon pageant.

On March 20, 2010, Mead won the Miss University of Oregon 2010 title. She competed in the 2010 Miss Oregon pageant with the platform "Raising Awareness of the Dangers Caused by Drinking and Driving" and a lyrical jazz dance performance in the talent portion of the competition. She was named a Top-10 semi-finalist for the state title.

On April 30, 2011, Mead won the Miss Marion-Polk County 2011 title. As one of 22 qualifiers, Mead competed in the 2011 Miss Oregon pageant with the platform "Operation Yellow Ribbon" and a dance performance in the talent portion of the competition. She was named first runner-up to winner Caroline McGowan.

=== Miss Oregon 2012 ===
On April 21, 2012, Mead was crowned Miss Three Rivers 2012. She entered the Miss Oregon pageant in June 2012 as one of 23 qualifiers for the state title. Mead's competition talent was a dance performance. Her platform was "Operation Yellow Ribbon".

Mead was named first runner-up at the competition on Saturday, June 30, 2012, as Rachel Berry received the crown. However, shortly after her win, questions were raised as to whether Berry met the residency requirement for the Miss Oregon pageant system. State rules required that Berry be a resident of Oregon for at least six months before entering any local pageant but she was unable to provide state pageant officials with this proof of residency. Berry stepped down as Miss Oregon on July 19, 2012, and returned $11,400 in scholarship prizes.

On July 25, 2012, pageant officials announced that former first runner-up Mead would take the crown and serve as the new Miss Oregon 2012. After receiving her crown, Mead was presented more than $10,000 in scholarship money and other prizes from the state pageant. As Miss Oregon, her activities included public appearances across the state of Oregon.

Mead's reign lasted until June 29, 2013, when she crowned her successor, Allison Cook, Miss Oregon 2013.

=== Vying for Miss America ===
Mead was Oregon's representative at the Miss America 2013 pageant in Las Vegas, Nevada, in January 2013. She was not chosen as a Top 16 Semi-Finalist and earned a $3,000 scholarship prize as a non-finalist.

== Personal life and education ==
Mead was raised in Newport, Oregon, and she is a 2006 graduate of Newport High School. From 2006 to 2007, she attended Portland Community College, and from 2007 to 2008 she attended Lane Community College. Mead is a 2011 graduate of the University of Oregon where she earned a bachelor's degree in psychology with a minor in communication studies.

On May 24, 2015, she married Adam Zahner. As of June 2015, she is a marketing liaison with the Finley Davis Financial Group in Eugene, Oregon, and the co-executive director of the Miss Oregon Scholarship Program.

Awards and achievements
Preceded by Rachel Berry	Miss Oregon; 2012	Succeeded by Allison Cook
