= Rebecca Anderson =

American beauty pageant titleholder (born 1991)

Rebecca Anderson (Muessle)
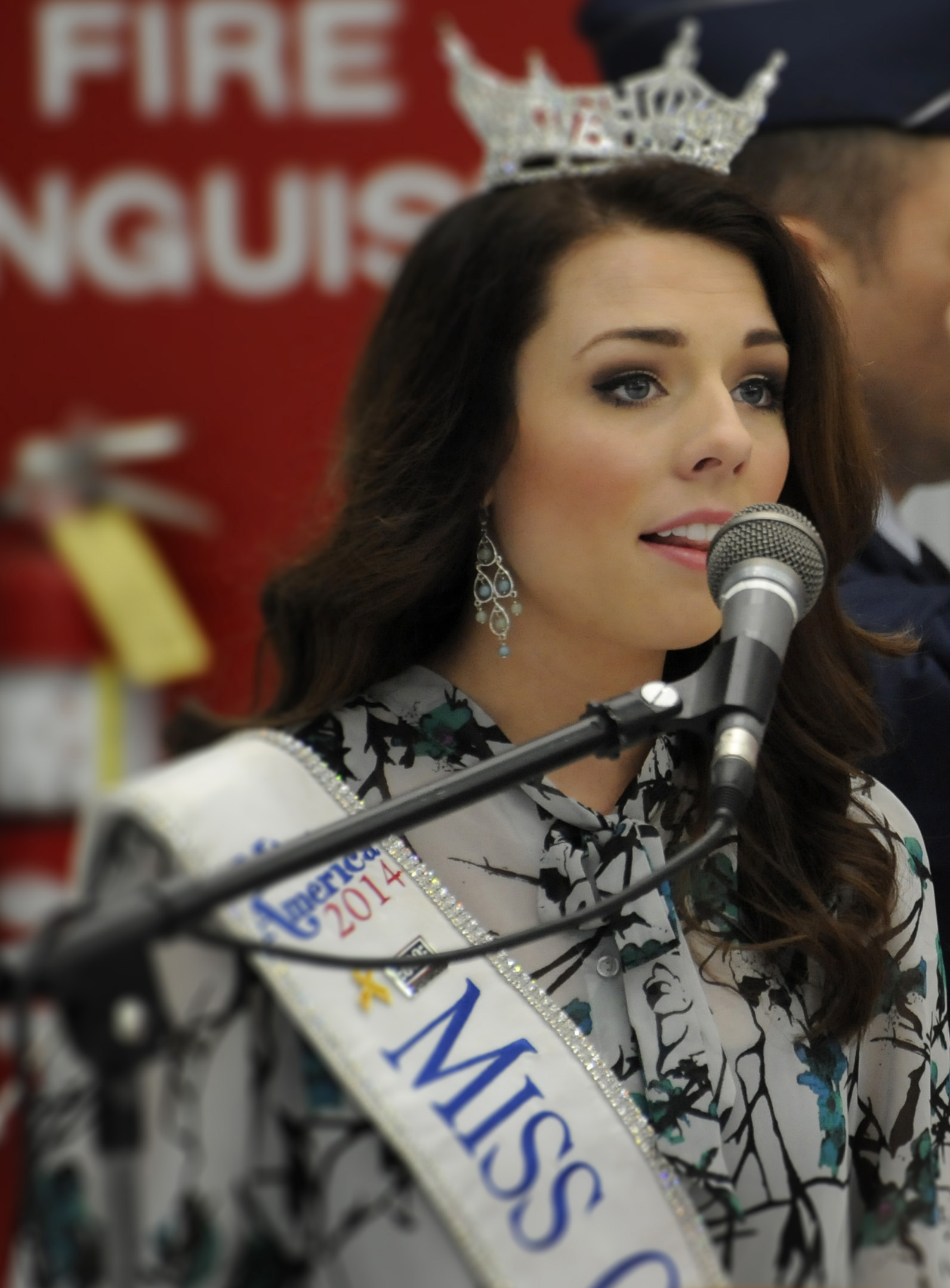
- Rebecca Anderson, December 2014
- Born: May 1991 (age 35)
- Education: Portland State University
- Height: 5 ft 4 in (163 cm)
- Spouse: Peter Muessle (2019)
- Beauty pageant titleholder
- Title: Miss Cascade 2011; Miss Columbia Gorge 2012; Miss Portland 2013; Miss Cascade 2014; Miss Oregon 2014
- Major competition: Miss America 2015

Rebecca Anderson (Muessle) (born May 1991) is an American beauty pageant titleholder from Oregon City, Oregon. She won a series of local titles beginning in 2011 and was crowned Miss Oregon 2014.

Entering her first pageant at age 19, Anderson competed successfully in local pageants until, on her fourth attempt, she won the state title in June 2014. She made appearances across the state and represented Oregon at Miss America 2015 in September 2014 but was not a finalist for the national crown. After completing her year as Miss Oregon, Anderson resumed her academic pursuits at the University of North Dakota.

== Early life and education ==
Anderson is a native of Oregon City, Oregon, and a 2009 graduate of Oregon City High School. While at OCHS, she participated in the drama program for four years and was a member of the school's dance team for two years. Her father is Ted Anderson, a wholesale nursery operator and licensed tax consultant. From 1999 to 2019, her mother Shari Anderson served as the elected County Treasurer of Clackamas County, Oregon. Anderson has one younger sister, Malea, who is also an occasional pageant competitor.

Anderson is a 2013 graduate of Portland State University where she earned a bachelor's degree in environmental science. In 2014, in addition to her Miss Oregon duties, Anderson worked part-time as a "cute" clown for an event company. In August 2015, Anderson moved to North Dakota to begin pursuing a bachelor's degree in atmospheric science at the University of North Dakota.

== Pageant career ==
=== Early pageants ===
Anderson began entering pageants at age 19, waiting until she felt was "responsible enough" to hold a pageant title. In early 2011, Anderson won the Miss Cascade 2011 title. She competed in the 2011 Miss Oregon pageant with the platform "Environmental Sustainability: Education for a Greener World" and a vocal performance of "Feeling Good" from the musical The Roar of the Greasepaint – The Smell of the Crowd in the talent portion of the competition. She finished in the top ten but was not a Top-5 finalist for the state title.

In early 2012, Anderson won the Miss Columbia Gorge 2012 title. She competed in the 2012 Miss Oregon pageant with the platform "Environmental Education" and a vocal performance in the talent portion of the competition. She finished in the top ten but was not a Top-5 finalist for the state crown.

In March 2013, Anderson won the Miss Portland 2013 title. She qualified for the 2013 Miss Oregon pageant as one of 22 entrants, including her younger sister Malea, competing as Miss Clackamas 2013. Rebecca Anderson competed with a platform of "American Red Cross: Red for Life" and a vocal performance of "Astonishing" from the musical Little Women in the talent portion of the competition. She was named third runner-up to winner Allison Cook.

=== Miss Oregon 2014 ===
On April 26, 2014, Anderson was crowned Miss Cascade 2014. She entered the Miss Oregon pageant in June 2014 as one of 23 qualifiers for the state title. Anderson's competition talent was a vocal performance of "Let it Go" from the Disney movie Frozen. Her platform was "American Red Cross: Red for Life". Her on-stage interview question asked whether discrimination was a factor in the gender pay gap in the United States. Anderson agreed but countered that "women need to be more assertive" and strive to close the gap themselves rather than wait for a government-mandated solution.

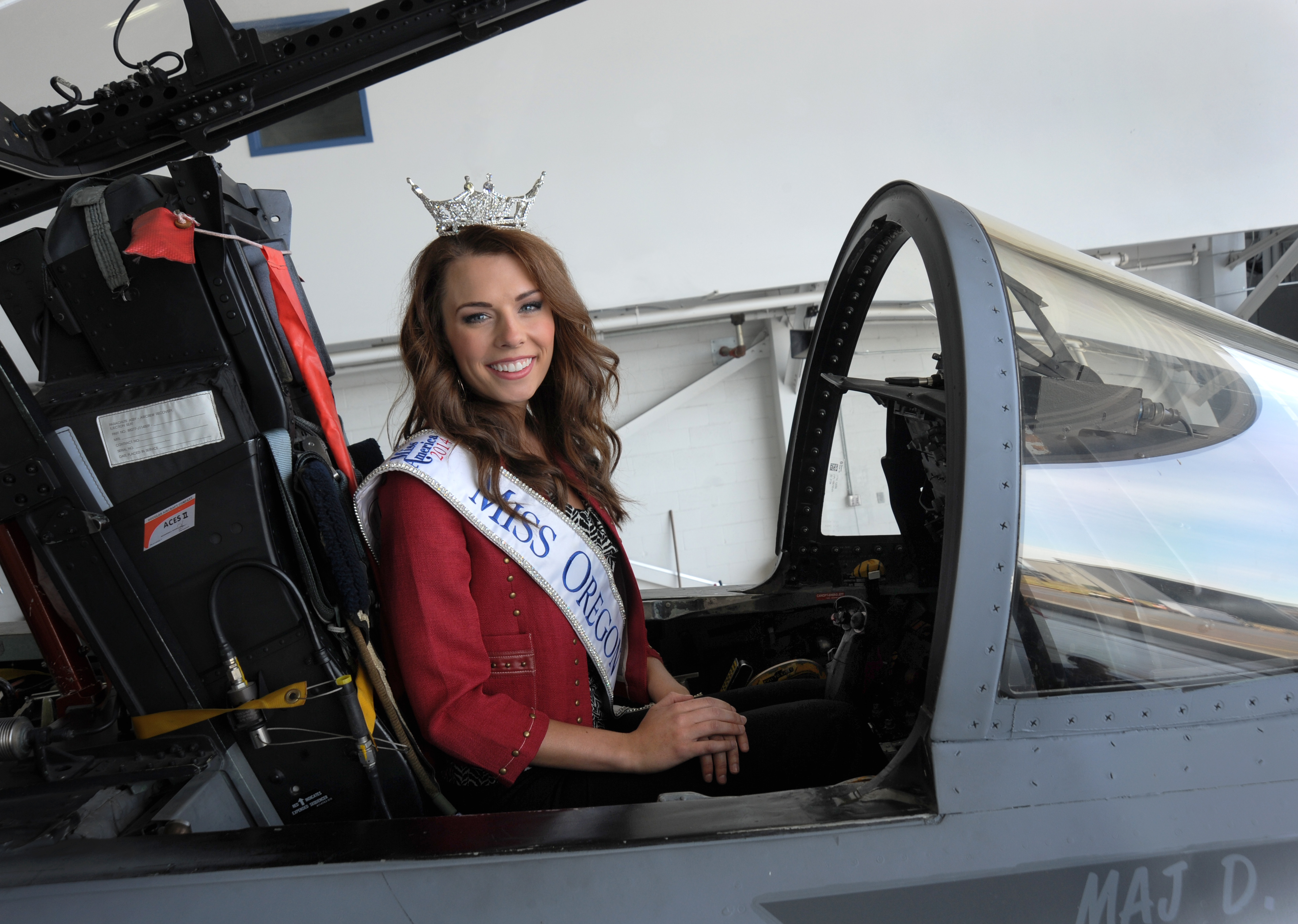
Rebecca Anderson in an F-15 Eagle at the Portland Air National Guard Base, August 2014

Anderson won the competition on Saturday, June 28, 2014, when she received her crown from outgoing Miss Oregon titleholder Allison Cook. She earned more than $10,000 in scholarship money and other prizes from the state pageant.

As Miss Oregon, Anderson's activities included public appearances across the state of Oregon. Notable appearances included participating in local pageants, welcoming Air National Guard members home to Oregon, and serving as a judge for the Just For Men World Beard and Moustache Championships. Anderson's reign as Miss Oregon continued until June 27, 2015, when she crowned her successor, Ali Wallace, Miss Oregon 2015.

=== Miss America 2015 contestant ===
Anderson was Oregon's representative at the Miss America 2015 pageant in Atlantic City, New Jersey, in September 2014. During the pageant's "Show Us Your Shoes" parade, Anderson wore a bicycle helmet and her shoes had tiny bicycles on top of the laces to tout Portland, Oregon, as a "bike-friendly" city. She was not a Top-16 semi-finalist for the national crown.

Awards and achievements
Preceded by Allison Cook	Miss Oregon; 2014	Succeeded by Ali Wallace
