= Tamara Fazzolari =

American beauty queen

- Born: Tamara Jean Fazzolari; July 27, 1966 (age 60); Portland Oregon
- Education: Mt. Hood Community College
- Beauty pageant titleholder
- Title: Miss Willamette Valley 1985; Miss Hillsboro 1986; Miss Portland 1987; Miss Oregon 1987
- Major competition: Miss America 1988

Tamara Jean Fazzolari Wallace (born July 27, 1966) is an American beauty pageant titleholder from Portland, Oregon, who was crowned Miss Oregon 1987. She competed for the Miss America 1988 title in September 1987 but was not a Top-10 finalist. Her daughter, Ali Wallace, was crowned Miss Oregon 2015.

== Pageant career ==
Fazzolari competed in the 1985 Miss Oregon pageant as Miss Willamette Valley 1985, one of 16 qualifiers for the state title. She was named was third runner-up to winner Dana Marie Kocks. In June 1986, she was chosen as Miss Hillsboro 1986. She competed in the 1986 Miss Oregon pageant but was not a top finalist for the state title.

She entered the Miss Oregon pageant in Seaside, Oregon, as Miss Portland in July 1987. Fazzolari's competition talent was tap dance. Fazzolari won the competition on Saturday, July 11, 1987, when she received her crown from outgoing Miss Oregon titleholder Jana Svea Peterson. She earned several thousand dollars in scholarship money and other prizes from the state pageant. As Miss Oregon, her activities included public appearances across the state of Oregon.

Fazzolari was Oregon's representative at the Miss America 1988 pageant in Atlantic City, New Jersey, in September 1987. The swimwear she wore at Miss America was donated by Jantzen, an apparel company based in Portland, Oregon. She performed a tap dance routine as her competition talent. Fazzolari was not a finalist for the national title. As a non-finalist, she earned a $2,000 scholarship for competing.

== Personal life and education ==
Fazzolari is a native of Hillsboro, Oregon, and a 1984 graduate of Benjamin Franklin High School in Portland, Oregon. Her parents are Tony and Ethel Fazzolari. Fazzolari is a 1987 graduate of Mt. Hood Community College.

On the morning of May 21, 1982, when Fazzolari was 15 years old, she was raped on the campus of Benjamin Franklin High School in Portland, Oregon. Her parents sued the Portland Public Schools and after a series of trials and appeals, the case was settled in the family's favor in November 1987. The case eventually made it to the Oregon Supreme Court, and is considered one of the leading negligence cases in the state (303 Or. 1).

Fazzolari married Chip Wallace on June 30, 1990. Their daughter, Alexis Wallace, was crowned Miss Oregon 2015 on June 17, 2015. As of 2015, Fazzolari is a dance instructor at All Star Dance Academy in Portland, Oregon.

Awards and achievements
Preceded by Jana Svea Peterson	Miss Oregon; 1987	Succeeded by Anna Denise Jones
