= Katie Harman =

Miss America 2002, classical vocalist and actress

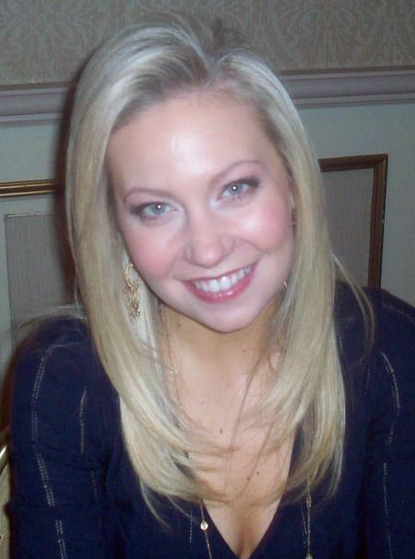
- Harman in January 2008
- Born: Katie Marie Harman; August 18, 1980 (age 46); Portland, Oregon, U.S.
- Education: Portland State University
- Occupations: Actress; singer
- Height: 5 ft 3 in (1.60 m)
- Title: Miss Portland 2001; Miss Multnomah County 2001; Miss Oregon 2001; Miss America 2002
- Predecessor: Angela Perez Baraquio
- Successor: Erika Harold
- Spouse: Tim Ebner (m. 2003)
- Children: 2
- Website: www.katieharman.com

Katie Marie Harman Ebner (born August 18, 1980) is an American classical vocalist and actress who won the Miss America 2002 and Miss Oregon 2001 pageants. She is the first and only contestant from the Pacific Northwestern United States to hold the title of Miss America.

After her pageant career, Harman has worked as a singer and actress, appearing in stage productions in the United States, as well as having a guest role on the HBO series Big Love in 2010.

== Early life ==
Harman was born in Portland, Oregon. Her family relocated to North Carolina during her childhood, but returned to Oregon when she was eight years old, settling in Gresham. She graduated from Centennial High School in Gresham in 1999, where she was involved in the drama department.

After high school, Harman enrolled at the University of Puget Sound in Tacoma, Washington, later transferring to Portland State University, where she graduated cum laude with a bachelor's degree in communications.

== Career ==
=== Miss America 2002 ===
In 2001, she was selected as Miss Multnomah County, and then won the Miss Oregon pageant, allowing her to compete for Miss America. She was selected as Miss America the Saturday after the September 11, 2001 attacks. Her first official appearances in the new role of Miss America were at the World Trade Center site and The Pentagon to visit rescue workers, at the request of journalist Janet Langhart Cohen.

In her speech, Harman said: "This is an opportunity for Miss America to rally the hopes of the American public. I want to make sure that this tragedy does not bring America down."

=== Post-Miss America ===
Since completing her duties as Miss America, she played Kathie in The Student Prince with the Gold Coast Opera in Florida. She also played Barbarina in Le nozze di Figaro. As a vocalist, she has performed with pianist André Watts with the Shreveport Symphony and others. Katie also appeared as herself in an episode of the improvisational comedy show Whose Line Is It Anyway? in 2002.

She delivered the keynote address for Portland State University's 2002 Commencement. This resulted in protests from the Progressive Student Union and other students and faculty who expressed concerns related to her credentials as Miss America and the pageant's promotion of a "sexist" attitude. In response to the controversy, Harman stated: "The Miss America program is offering young women to have a voice. The elements of competition and judging is such that it doesn't concentrate on a woman's appearance. It's about intellect and passion for issues. It has little or nothing to do with the way she looks. I'm 5'3", and I grew up never thinking I could be a supermodel. Miss America embraces women who have inner beauty. If you have joy and hope, it makes you beautiful. This is not a sexist competition in any way.

Harman acted in a production of "The Secret Garden" at the Portland Center for the Performing Arts in 2006 and 2007. In 2007, she released her first music CD, Soul of Love, featuring light classical music. In 2010, she made her acting debut as Miss Provo in an episode of the HBO series Big Love, during which she performed a musical number at a campaign rally.

She has appeared in several television commercials in the Portland metropolitan area, including promotional spots for Portland Rescue Mission. In September 2016, she appeared onstage as Emma in a production of Jekyl & Hyde at the Brunish Theatre, Antoinette Hatfield Hall in Portland.

== Personal life ==
Harman married Oregon Air National Guard pilot Tim Ebner in 2003 and she gave birth to a son Tyler Glen Ebner in 2005. In 2005, Harman moved with her husband and son to Klamath Falls, Oregon where he continues to work for the Oregon Air National Guard. In 2009 she gave birth to a daughter.

== Works ==
=== Filmography ===
Year	Title	Role	Notes
2002	Whose Line Is It Anyway?	Herself	1 episode
2002	Dare to Dream: A Concert for Hope	Herself	
2010	Big Love	Miss Provo	Episode: "Sins of the Father"

=== Discography ===
- Soul of Love (2007)

== Notes ==
Awards and achievements
Preceded by Angela Perez Baraquio	Miss America; 2002	Succeeded by Erika Harold
Preceded by Angela Brink	Miss Oregon; 2001	Succeeded by Heidi Rickey
