= Fleener (surname) =

Fleener is a surname. Notable people with the surname include:

- Coby Fleener (born 1988), American football player
- Mary Fleener (born 1951), American alternative comics artist, writer and musician
- Thomas Fleener, American military officer and Guantanamo detainee defense lawyer

== See also ==
- Fleener, Indiana
