= Unionville, Indiana =

- Unincorporated community
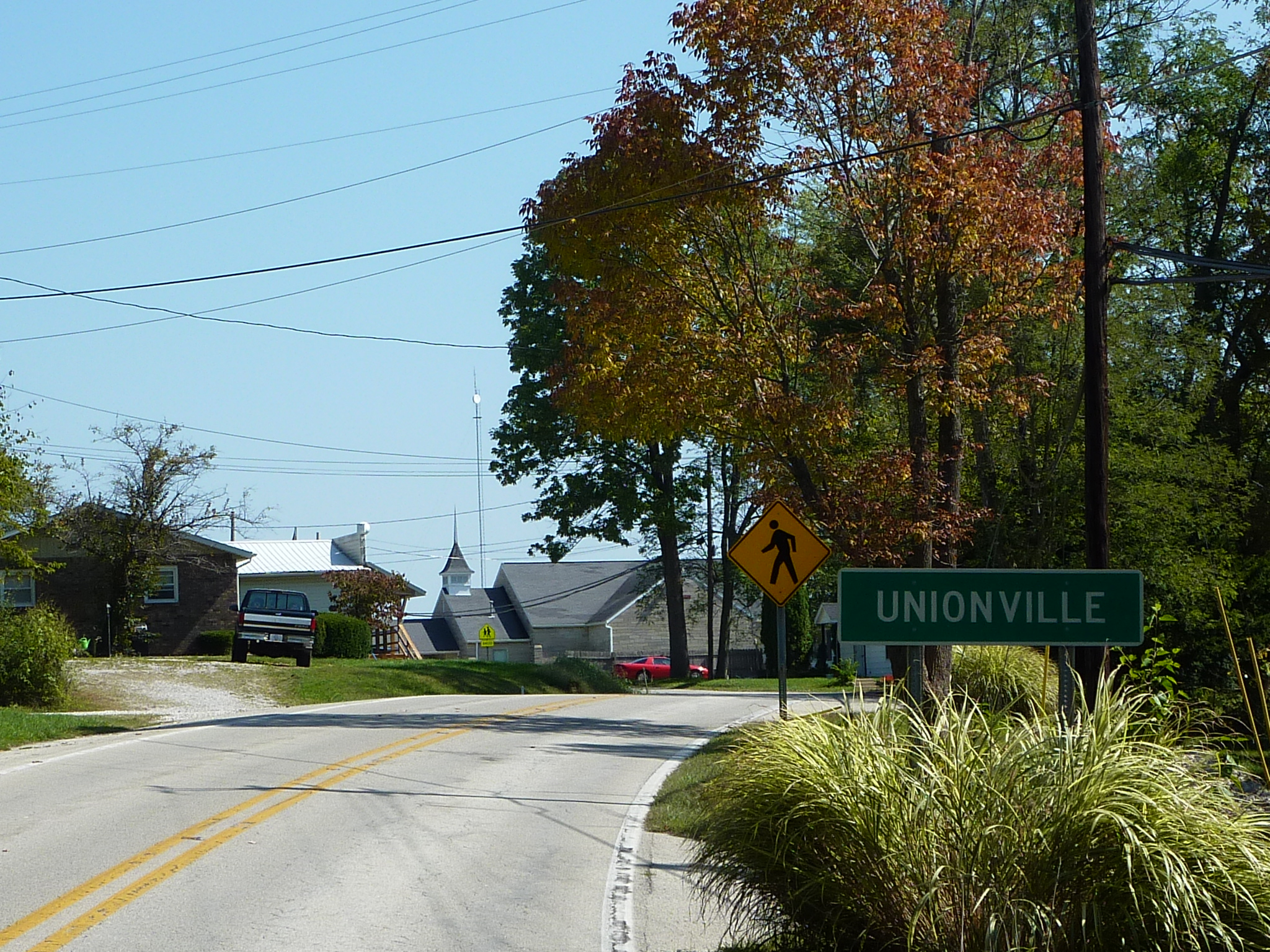

- Location within Indiana Location within the United States
- Coordinates: 39°13′48″N 86°24′58″W
- Country: United States
- State: Indiana
- County: Monroe
- Township: Benton
- Elevation: 876 ft (267 m)
- Time zone: UTC-5 (Eastern (EST))
  - Summer (DST): UTC-4 (EDT)
- ZIP code: 47468
- Area codes: 812, 930
- FIPS code: 18-77894
- GNIS feature ID: 445140

Unionville is an unincorporated community in Benton Township, Monroe County, in the U.S. state of Indiana.

== History ==
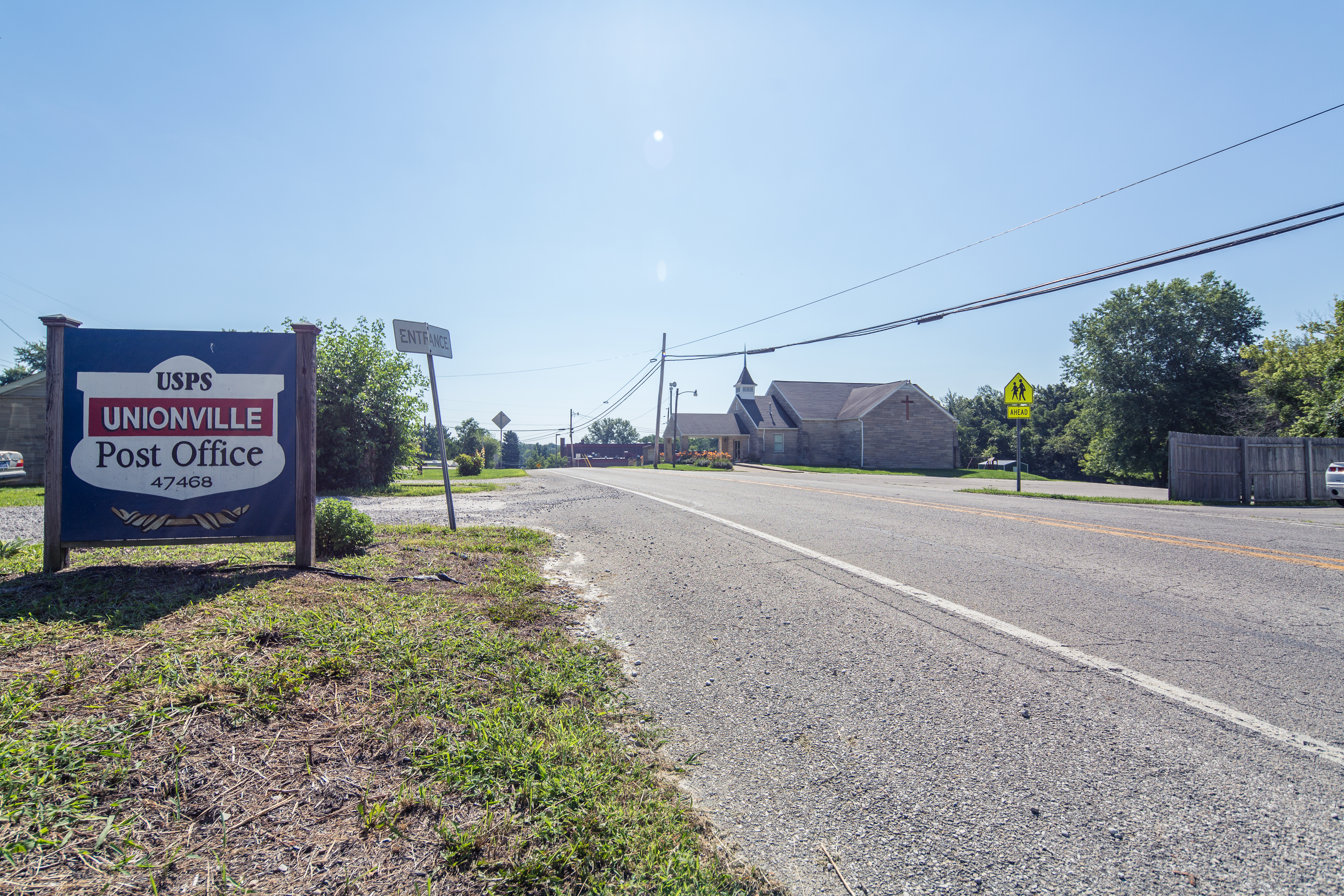
Unionville, Indiana

Unionville was originally known as Fleenersburg, and under the latter name was plateted in 1847. The post office at Unionville has been in operation since 1848.

In 1911, Unionville was the precise center of the United States population. A monument was dedicated there at that time.

== Education ==
Unionville is home to an elementary school, Unionville Elementary School, which was once Unionville High School.
