= Miss Oregon =

Beauty pageant competition

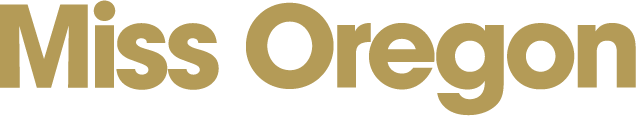
- Formation: 1922; 104 years ago
- Type: Beauty pageant
- Headquarters: Portland
- Location: Oregon
- Members: Miss America
- Official language: English
- Website: www.missoregon.org

The Miss Oregon competition is a regional scholarship competition that selects the representative for the US state of Oregon in the Miss America pageant. The annual event includes contestants from across the state and awards scholarships to the participants.

Alyssa Defillipo of Klamath Falls was crowned Miss Oregon on June 27, 2026, at the Seaside Convention Center in Seaside, Oregon. She competed for the title of Miss America 2027 on September 6, 2026, at the Kravis Center for the Performing Arts in West Palm Beach, Florida.

== Gallery of past titleholders ==
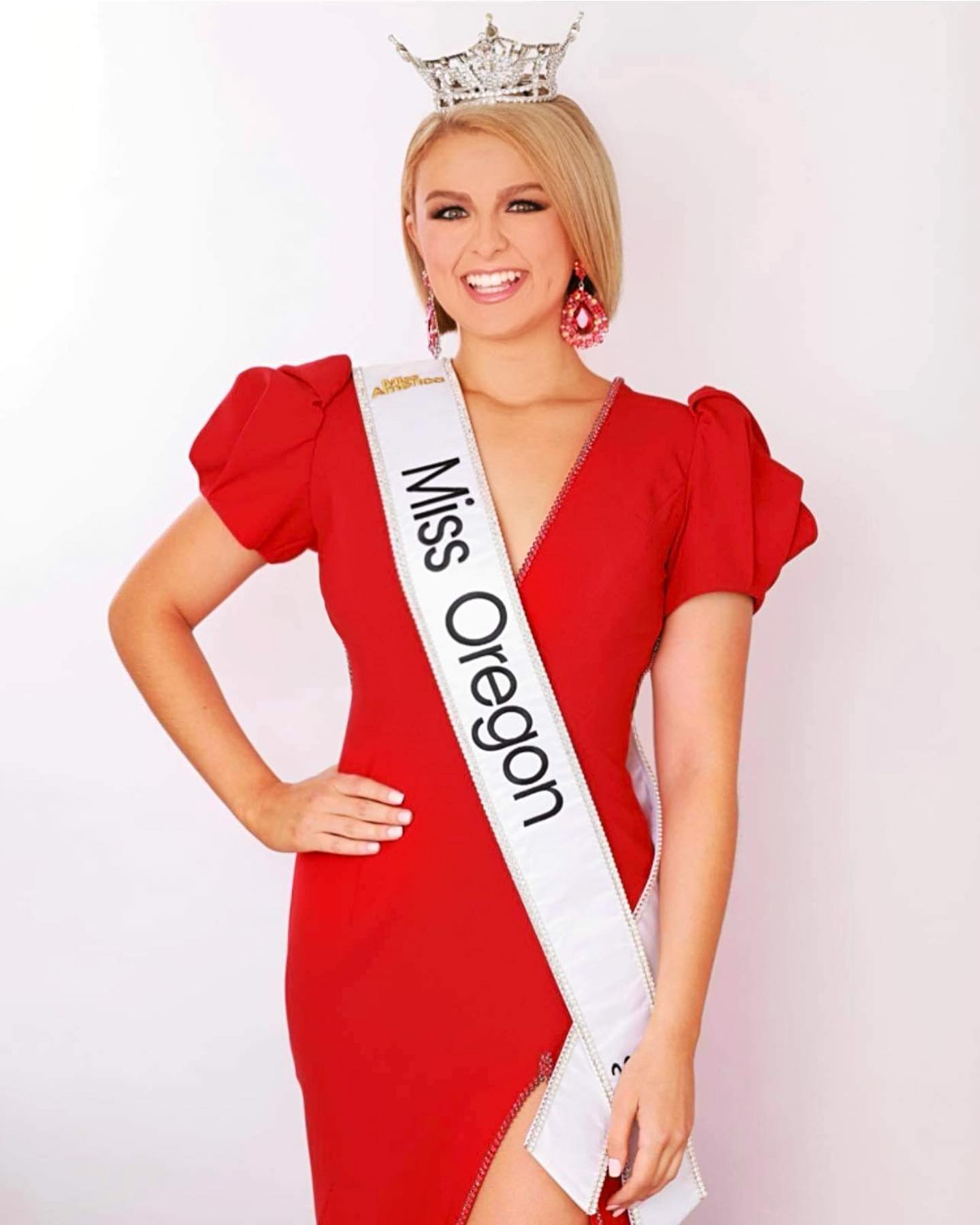
Sophia Takla was Miss Oregon 2022, and Top 10 at Miss America

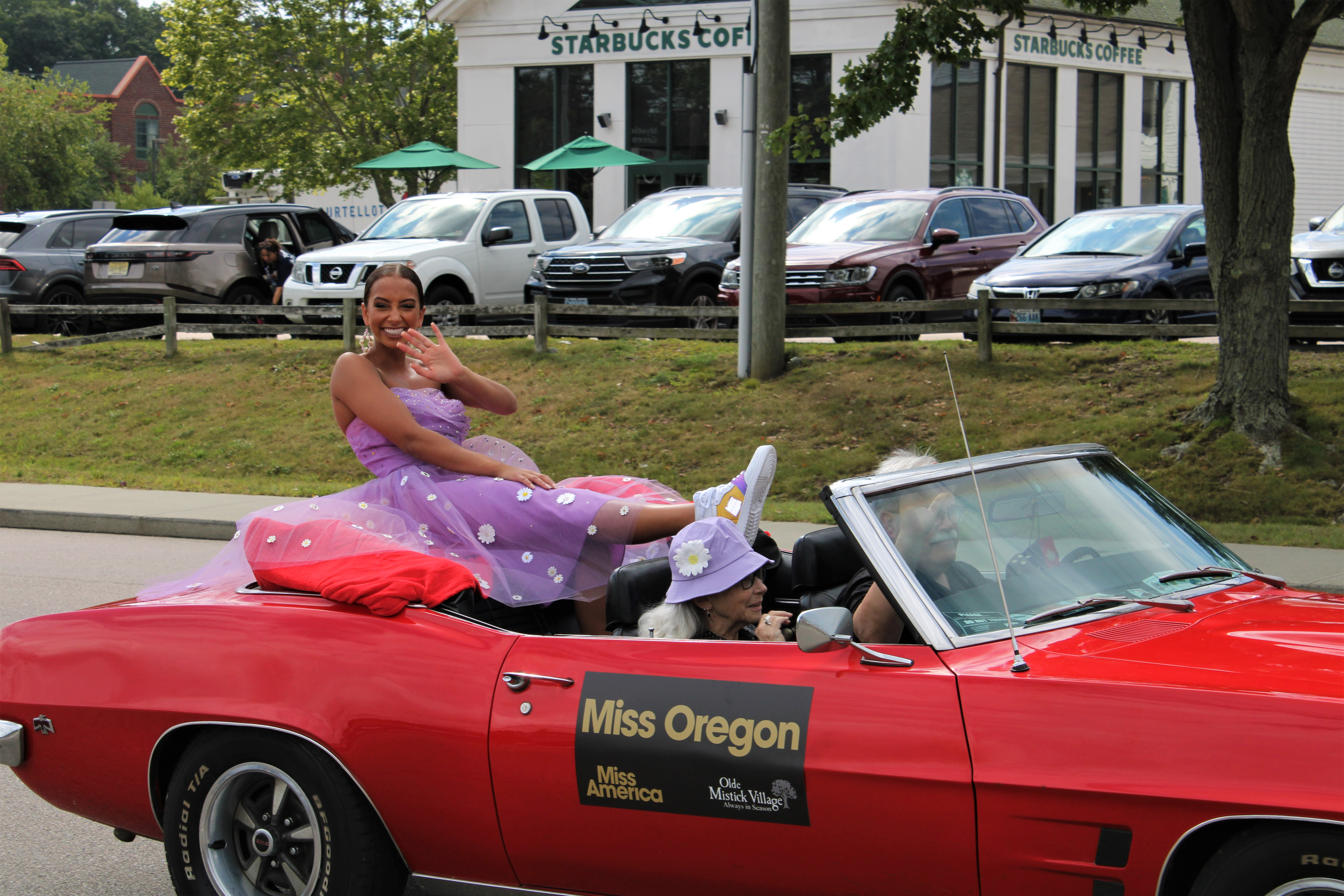
Miss Oregon 2021 Abigail Hayes in the iconic Show Us Your Shoes Parade. Hayes wore custom Nike Shoes. Abigail placed 4th Runner Up to Miss America.

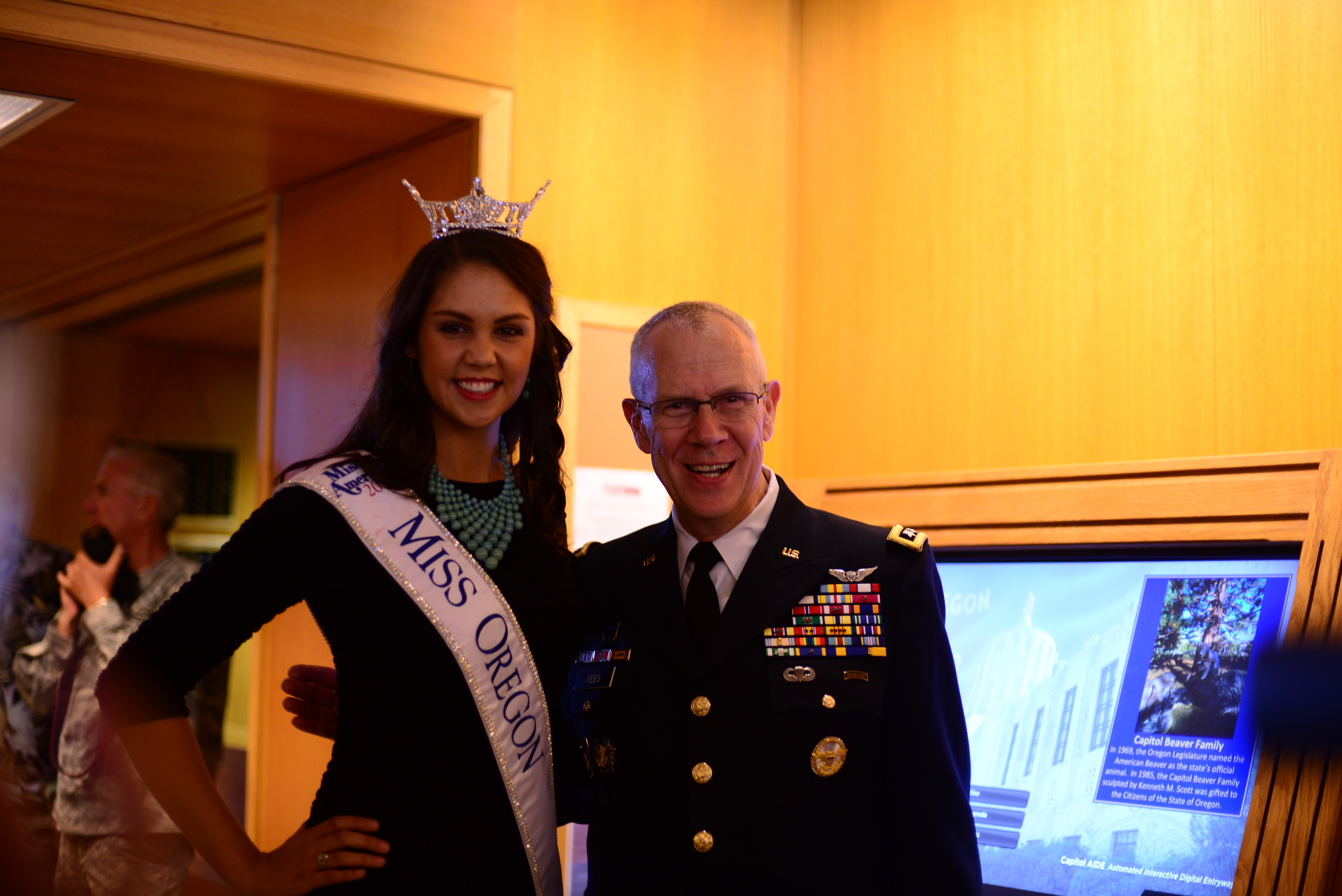
Allison Cook,
Miss Oregon 2013, with Raymond F. Rees

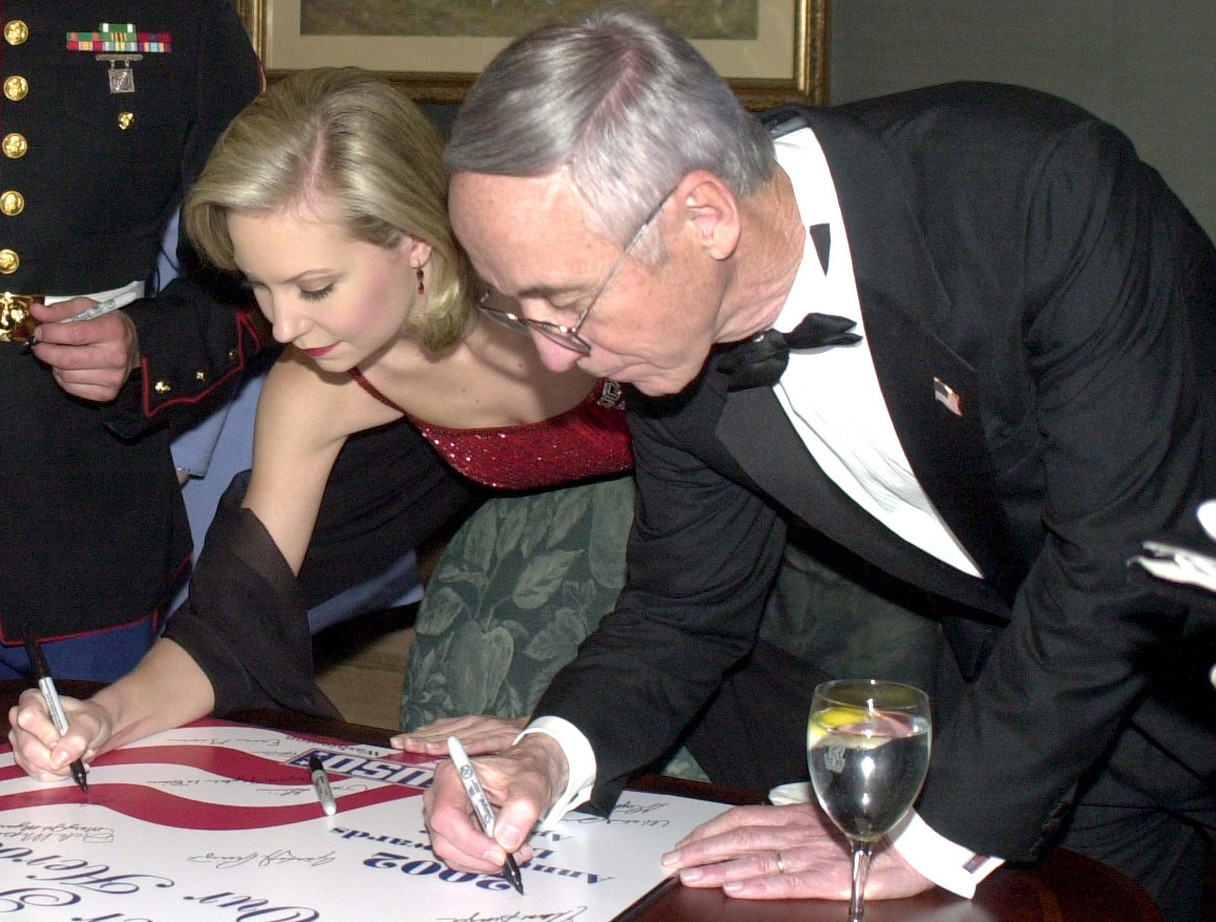
Katie Harman,
Miss Oregon 2001 and Miss America 2002, signing poster

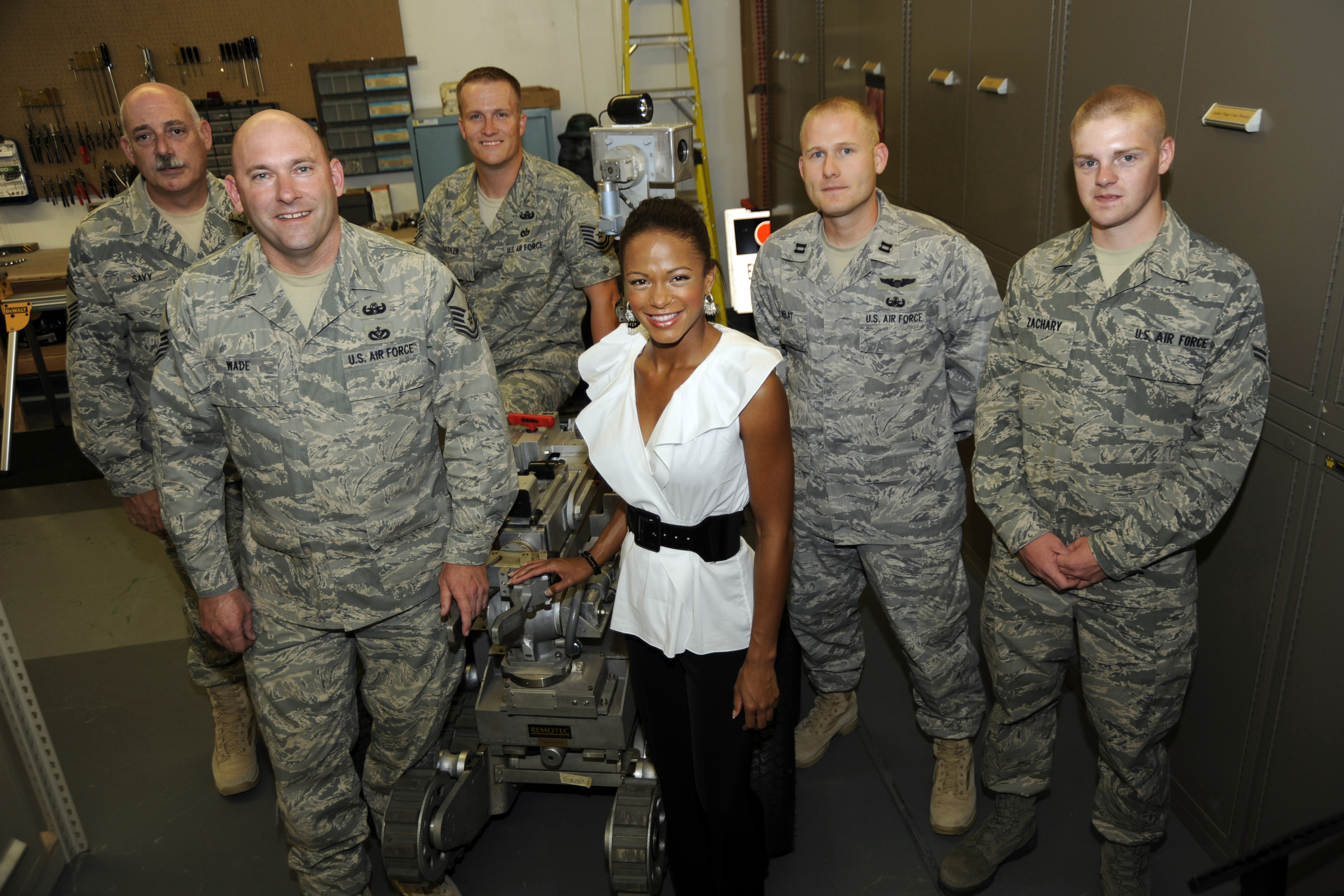
Miss Oregon 2009 CC Barber

== History ==
The event began in 1947 as the Miss Oregon Pageant and was founded by the merchants in the coastal city of Seaside. Miss Oregon was designated the official State Hostess in 1969. In 2001, Katie Harman was crowned Miss Oregon and went on to win the Miss America crown, becoming the only Miss Oregon winner of the national event. The event is now titled the Miss Oregon Scholarship Pageant.

The event is held at the Seaside Civic and Convention Center at the Oregon Coast with local Seaside merchants as the primary sponsors of the annual contest. The preliminary nights narrow the competition down to around ten finalists before selecting a winner on finals night. Events at the event include an evening wear competition, talent competition, a fitness wear competition, and a private interview. The competition includes an interview on-stage as the final portion before a winner is selected.

In addition to the chance to become Miss America, the winner also receives scholarships. Contests range in age from 18 to 28, and must first win local competitions or compete at large before qualifying for the Miss Oregon contest.

== Results summary ==
The following is a visual summary of the past results of Miss Oregon titleholders at the national Miss America pageants/competitions. The year in parentheses indicates the year of the national competition during which a placement and/or award was garnered, not the year attached to the contestant's state title.

=== Placements ===
- Miss America: Katie Harman (2002)
- 1st runners-up: Dorothy Mae Johnson (1956), Emily John Orton (1996)
- 2nd runners-up: Patricia Regan Leines (1997)
- 3rd runners-up: Marjean Kay Langley (1969), Elizabeth Simmons (1994)
- 4th runners-up: Abigail Hayes (2022)
- Top 10: Patti Throop (1954), Judith Hansen (1958), Martha Wyatt (1963), Sue Pack (1966), Suzanne Bunker (1978), Julie Ross (1982), Tamara Ann Finch (1998)
- Top 11: Sophia Takla (2023)
- Top 15: Jo Ann Amorde (1947), Joyce Davis (1948), CC Barber (2010), Stephenie Steers (2011)

=== Awards ===
==== Preliminary awards ====
- Preliminary Lifestyle and Fitness: Patricia Regan Leines (1997), CC Barber (2010)
- Preliminary Private Interview Award: Shivali Kadam (2020)
- Preliminary Talent: Judith Hansen (1958), Patricia Regan Leines (1997), Katie Harman (2002)

==== Non-finalist awards ====
- Non-finalist Interview: April Robinson (2004)
- Non-finalist Talent: Rosemary Doolen (1961), Lynn Dee Grenz (1972), Sandra Lynn Herring (1973), Shan Moss (1977), Teresa Richardson (1981), Stephanie "Jill" Wymer (1984), Kari Virding (2008)

==== Other awards ====
- Miss Congeniality: N/A
- Quality of Life Award Finalists: Lynette Boggs (1990), Alyssa Defillipo (2027)
- Steinway Talent Award: Tamara Ann Finch (1998)
- STEM Scholarship Award Finalists: Rebecca Anderson (2015)
- Tiffany Phillips Memorial Scholar Athlete Award: Jennifer Sisco-Moore (1999), Angela Reed (2000)
- AHA Go Red for Women Leadership Award Regional Winner: Mya Cash (2026)

== Winners ==
- Declared as winner
- Ended as a runner-up
- Ended as a finalist or semi-finalist

Year	Name	Hometown	Age	Local Title	Miss America Talent	Placement at Miss America	Special scholarships at Miss America	Notes
2026	Alyssa Defillipo	Klamath Falls	26	Miss Sierra Cascade	Vocal		Quality of Life Finalist	
2025	Mya Cash	Eugene	23	Miss Lane County	Dance		AHA Go Red for Women Leadership Award Regional Winner	
2024	Abigail Hoppe	McMinnville	25	Miss Three Rivers	Latin Ballroom Dance, 'Let's Get Loud"			Previously Miss Oregon's Outstanding Teen 2016
2023	Allison Burke	Tigard	27	Miss Central Valley	Violin "Storm" from Vivaldi's Four Seasons-Summer			
2022	Sophia Takla	Portland	21	Miss Meadowlark	Vocal "Don't Rain on My Parade"	Top 10		Daughter of Kimberly Stubblefield Takla, Miss Oregon USA 1986; Later Miss Oregon Volunteer 2026; 4th runner-up at Miss Volunteer America 2027
2021	Abigail Hayes	Damascus	20	Miss Emerald Valley	Vocal/Piano, "If I Ain't Got You"	4th runner-up		
2019–20 (Note: Titleholder extended to a second full year in 2020 after state and national pageants postponed to 2021 due to the COVID-19 pandemic)	Shivali Kadam	Tigard	25	Miss Portland	Vocal, "Reflection" from Mulan		Preliminary Private Interview Award	First Oregon titleholder of Indian heritage Previously Miss Oregon Sweetheart 2018; 3rd runner-up at National Sweetheart 2018 pageant
2018	Taylor Ballard	Portland	25	Miss NW Wonderland	Jazz Dance, "Salute"			
2017	Harley Emery	Springfield	20	Miss Lane County	Classical Piano, "Moonlight Escapade"			Previously Miss Oregon's Outstanding Teen 2013
2016	Alexis Mather	Astoria	21	Miss Portland	Bravura Performance, "Nessun Dorma"			
2015	Ali Wallace	Portland	21	Miss Portland	Lyrical Dance, "Latch" by Sam Smith			Daughter of Miss Oregon 1987, Tamara Fazzolari 2nd runner-up at Miss Oregon USA 2018 pageant
2014	Rebecca Anderson	Oregon City	23	Miss Cascade	Vocal, "For Good"		STEM Scholarship Finalist	
2013	Allison Cook	Klamath Falls	19	Miss Southern Gem	Electro-Acoustic Violin, "Let's Get It Started Remix" by The Black-Eyed Peas			Later Miss Oregon USA 2021
2012	Nichole Mead	Newport	24	Miss Three Rivers	Lyrical Dance, "What's Love Got to Do With It"			Originally first runner-up, succeeded to the crown after Berry resigned Contestant at National Sweetheart 2011 pageant
2012	Rachel Berry	Burbank, CA	24	Miss Willamette Valley	Tap Dance	Unable to compete; resigned July 19, 2012, due to residency ineligibility		
2011	Caroline McGowan	Waukee, IA	20	Miss Linn-Benton County	Operatic Vocal, "Chanson Boheme" from Carmen			Eligible as student at Oregon State University
2010	Stephenie Steers	Klamath Falls	24	Miss Multnomah	Vocal, "Something to Talk About"	Top 15		Voted into the Top 15 as a "Contestants' Choice" finalist selected by her fellow contestants
2009	CC Barber	Scappoose	23	Miss Tri Valley	Dance, "Bleeding Love"	Top 15	Preliminary Swimsuit Award	Contestant at National Sweetheart 2006 pageant Voted into the Top 15 as a "Contestants' Choice" finalist selected by her fellow contestants
2008	Danijela Krstić	Beaverton	24	Miss Tri Valley	Belly Dancing			
2007	Kari Virding	Portland	24	Miss Portland	Vocal, "The Girl in 14G"		Non-finalist Talent Award	Previously Miss Oregon Teen USA 2000
2006	Donilee McGinnis	Scappoose	24	Miss Willamette Valley	Tap Dance, "I Gotcha"			
2005	Lucy Fleck	Portland	20	Miss Portland	Tap Dance, "Turn the Beat Around"			Contestant at National Sweetheart 2003 pageant
2004	Brook Roberts	Roseburg	21	Miss Douglas County	Vocal, "All That Jazz"			Contestant on The Amazing Race 17
2003	April Robinson	Gresham	22	Miss Multnomah County	Acapella Tap Dance		Non-finalist Interview Award	
2002	Brita Stream	Eugene	22	Miss Linn-Benton	Vocal, "As If We Never Said Goodbye" from Sunset Boulevard			
2001	Heidi Rickey	Lincoln City	19	Miss Yamhill County	Vocal	Did not compete; originally 1st runner-up, later assumed the title after Harmon won Miss America 2002		
2001	Katie Harman	Gresham	21	Miss Portland	Classical Vocal, "O Mio Babbino Caro"	Winner	Preliminary Talent Award	Contestant at National Sweetheart 2000 pageant
2000	Angela Day Brink	Roseburg	22	Miss Douglas County	Ballet, "Angel"			
1999	Angela Reed	Portland	23	Miss Tri-Valley	Vocal, "You Don't Know Me"		Tiffany Phillips Memorial Scholar Athlete Award	Top 10 at National Sweetheart 1997 & 1998 pageants
1998	Jennifer Sisco-Moore	Eugene	23	Miss Tri-Valley	Classical Vocal, "Una Voce Poco Fa" from The Barber of Seville		Tiffany Phillips Memorial Scholar Athlete Award	
1997	Tamara Ann Finch	Myrtle Creek	24	Miss Douglas County	Classical Piano, "Scherzo No. 2 in B Flat Minor" by Chopin	Top 10	Steinway Talent Award Winner	
1996	Patricia Regan Leines	Medford	24	Miss Tri-Valley	Classical Vocal, "Chacun le Sait" from La fille du régiment	2nd runner-up	Preliminary Swimsuit Award Preliminary Talent Award	
1995	Emily John Orton	Creswell	19	Miss Linn-Benton	Classical Vocal, "Je dis que rien ne m'épouvante" from Carmen	1st runner-up		
1994	Roberta Stenbeck	Roseburg	23	Miss Douglas County	Piano			
1993	Elizabeth Simmons	Bandon	23	Miss Tri-Valley	Vocal, "Someone Else's Story" from Chess	3rd runner-up		Winner, National Sweetheart 1992 Starred in The Magical World of Barbie at Epcot Center in Walt Disney World
1992	Sara Kristi Paulson	Portland	21	Miss Washington County	Vocal, "The Star-Spangled Banner"			
1991	Carolyn Helen Ladd	Corvallis	24	Miss Linn-Benton	Vocal, "I Must Be a Star"			
1990	Brittney Gae Thompson	Portland	20	Miss Tri-Valley	Vocal, "Break It to Me Gently"			
1989	Lynette Boggs	Portland	25	Miss Portland	Vocal, "I Am Changing"		Quality Of Life Award Finalist	Served on the board of directors for the Miss America pageant Served on Las Vegas City Council and Clark County Commission
1988	Anna Denise Jones	Portland	24	Miss Tri-Valley	Vocal, "Crazy"			
1987	Tamara Fazzolari	Portland	21	Miss Portland	Tap Dance			Mother of Miss Oregon 2015, Ali Wallace
1986	Jana Svea Peterson	Newport	22	Miss Linn-Benton	Vocal Medley			
1985	Dana Kocks	Ashland	21	Miss Rogue Valley	Classical Vocal, "Seguidilla" from Carmen			
1984	Renee Bagley	Portland	22	Miss Willamette Valley	Popular Vocal, "Don't Cry Out Loud"			
1983	Stephanie "Jill" Wymer	Sutherlin	22	Miss Douglas County	Popular Vocal, "Out Here on my Own" from Fame		Non-finalist Talent Award	
1982	Laura Matthys	Salem	21	Miss Linn-Benton	Rifle Twirling Routine, "Herzegovinian March"			
1981	Julie Ross	Portland	20	Miss Portland	Classical Piano, "Toccata" by Prokofiev	Top 10		
1980	Teresa Richardson	Forest Grove	20	Miss Multnomath County	Vocal, "I Could Have Danced All Night" from My Fair Lady		Non-finalist Talent Award	Sister of Miss Utah 1973, Brenda Richardson
1979	Tami Sanders	Roseburg	21	Miss Douglas County	Gymnastic Dance, "A Fifth of Beethoven"			
1978	Amy White	Portland	20	Miss Portland	Musical Comedy Free Style Dance, Overture from Gypsy			
1977	Suzanne Bunker	Forest Grove	21	Miss Portland	Classical Flute, "Fantasie for Flute"	Top 10		
1976	Shan Moss	Nyssa	21	Miss Malheur County	Flute, "Concertino"		Non-finalist Talent Award	
1975	Betty Hupfer	Milwaukie	21	Miss Gresham	Dance, Music from The Unsinkable Molly Brown			
1974	Juli Ann Berg	Eugene	21	Miss Lane County	Vocal, "Corner of the Sky" from Pippin			Daughter of Miss Oregon 1947, Jo Ann Amorde
1973	Nancy Jean Jackson	Nyssa	20	Miss Rogue Valley	Dramatic Interpretation from The Taming of the Shrew			
1972	Sandra Lynn Herring	Portland	20	Miss Portland	Vocal Medley, "Who Will Buy?" & "As Long as He Needs Me" from Oliver!		Non-finalist Talent Award	
1971	Lynn Dee Grenz	Milwaukie	20	Miss Linn County	Vocal, "Hurry! It's Lovely Up Here" from On a Clear Day You Can See Forever		Non-finalist Talent Award	Former Speaker of the Oregon House of Representatives and past House Majority Leader; Judge at Miss America 1999 pageant
1970	Cynthia Lynn Harrison	Portland	18	Miss Rogue Valley	Vocal & Guitar, "Just Once"			
1969	Margie Elaine Huhta	Astoria	20	Miss Knappa-Svensen	Vocal Medley, "Nobody Knows You When You're Down and Out" & "Brother, Can You Spare a Dime?"			
1968	Marjean Kay Langley	Milton-Freewater	19	Miss Pendleton	Classical Ballet, "The Dying Swan"	3rd runner-up		
1967	Christine Beach	Pendleton	18	Miss Pendleton	Vocal, "Just You Wait" from My Fair Lady			
1966	Lita Schiel	Lake Oswego	21	Miss Lake Oswego	Original Skit			
1965	Sue Pack	Eugene	18	Miss Eugene	Vocal, "The Lonely Goatherd" from The Sound of Music	Top 10		Joined The New Christy Minstrels in 1966; Wife of Mickey Newbury
1964	Carol Pedersen	Newport	18	Miss Lincoln County	Dramatic Reading			
1963	D’Ann Fullerton	Roseburg		Miss Roseburg	Original Novelty Dance & Hula Baton			
1962	Martha Wyatt	Jacksonville	19	Miss Rogue Valley	Interpretive Jazz Dance, "Love Walked In"	Top 10		
1961	Jody Bourne	Salem	20	Miss Salem	Interpretive Ballet			
1960	Rosemary Doolen	Salem	19	Miss Salem	Vocal, "A Heart That's Free"		Non-finalist Talent Award	
1959	Karlyn Mattsson	Portland	18	Miss Portland	Piano & Dance			
1958	Mary Ellen Vinton	McMinnville		Miss McMinnville	Piano & Tap Dance, "I Won't Dance"			
1957	Judith Hansen	Astoria		Miss Astoria	Classical Vocal, "Mi Chiamano Mimi" from La bohème	Top 10	Preliminary Talent Award	
1956	Patricia Berg	Eugene		Miss Eugene	Vibraharp, "Indian Love Call"			
1955	Dorothy Mae Johnson	Portland		Miss Beaverton	Dramatic Monologue from Macbeth	1st runner-up		Dorothy Mae Johnson Papadakos White Stevens died at age 85 in Ormond Beach, Florida on April 7, 2022.
1954	Diane Carman	Milwaukie	19	Miss Oak Grove	Drama, "This Is America"			Diane Carman Pace died at age 91 on June 6, 2026 in Provo, Utah.
1953	Patti Throop	Portland		Miss Portland	Dramatic Reading, "Patterns"	Top 10		She was a showgirl at the Tropicana Hotel in Las Vegas, Nevada in 1957.
1952	Mary Lou Teague	Eugene		Miss Eugene	Vocal, "Love Is Where you Find It"			
1951	Audrey Ann Mistretta	Astoria	18	Miss Tongue Point	Vocal			
1950	Elizabeth Ann Baker	Monmouth		Miss McMinnville	Classical Piano, Clair de Lune			
1949	Beverly Kruger	The Dalles		Miss The Dalles	Monologue, "The Waltz" by Dorothy Parker			
1948	Joyce Davis	Bend		Miss Redmond	Classical Vocal, "Mon cœur s'ouvre à ta voix"	Top 15		
1947	Jo Ann Amorde	Sutherlin		Miss Roseburg	Vocal, "Alice Blue Gown" from Irene	Top 15		Mother of Miss Oregon 1974, Juli Ann Berg
1935–46	No Oregon representative at Miss America pageant							
1934	No national pageant was held							
1933	No Oregon representative at Miss America pageant							
1932	No national pageants were held							
1931	No national pageants were held							
1930	No national pageants were held							
1929	No national pageants were held							
1928	No national pageants were held							
1927	No Oregon representative at Miss America pageant							
1926	Maxine Jennings	Portland		Miss Portland	N/A			Competed under local title at national pageant
1925	No Oregon representative at Miss America pageant							
1924	No Oregon representative at Miss America pageant							
1923	Patricia Smith	Portland		Miss Portland	N/A			Competed under local title at national pageant
1922	Virginia Edwards	Portland		Miss Portland	N/A			Competed under local title at national pageant
1921	No Oregon representative at Miss America pageant							
