= Miss America 2002 =

75th edition of the Miss America competition

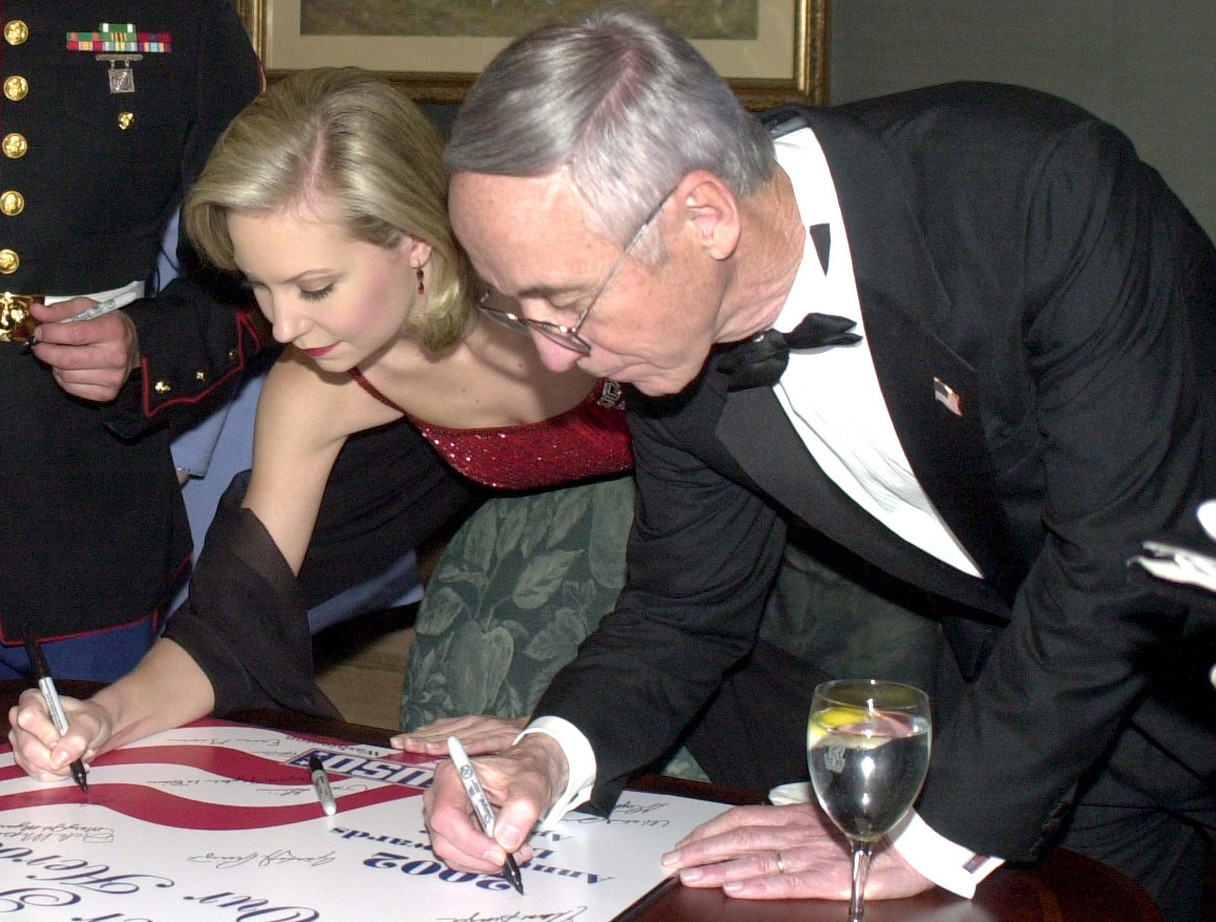
- Katie Harman, Miss America 2002, and Secretary of the Navy Gordon England personalize the poster at the USO's Annual Awards Dinner
- Date: September 22, 2001
- Presenters: Tony Danza
- Venue: Boardwalk Hall, Atlantic City, New Jersey
- Broadcaster: ABC
- Entrants: 51
- Placements: 20
- Winner: Katie Harman; Oregon

Miss America 2002, the 75th Miss America pageant, was televised live from Boardwalk Hall in Atlantic City, New Jersey on Saturday, September 22, 2001, on the ABC Network. The pageant was won by Katie Harman of Oregon, the first woman representing that state to take the crown.

It was originally scheduled for September 15, 2001, but the September 11 attacks where the pageant activities were already took place, the delegates spent a weekend in Philadelphia, Pennsylvania where they participated in a parade and attended a reception and did some sightseeing. During their first week in Atlantic City, Miss America Organization organizers proposed a plan that the cancelling of the traditional pageant-eve parade, it was decided to hold the pageant as intended. The contestants themselves voted 2–1 to continue with the competition.

== Results ==
=== Placements ===
Placement	Contestant
Miss America 2002	Oregon – Katie Harman
1st Runner-Up	Massachusetts – Abbie Lynne Rabine
2nd Runner-Up	Tennessee – Stephanie Culberson
3rd Runner-Up	District of Columbia – Marshawn Evans
4th Runner-Up	New York – Andrea Plummer
Top 10	Arkansas – Jessie Ward; Florida – Kelly Gaudet; Michigan – Stacey Essbaggers; Utah – Jaclyn Hunt; West Virginia – Danae DeMasi
Top 20	California – Stephanie Baldwin; Indiana – Allison Hatcher; Maryland – Kelly Glorioso; Mississippi – Becky Pruett; Missouri – Jennifer Ann Hover; Nebraska – Christina Foehlinger; Oklahoma – Kaci Hundley; Pennsylvania – Rosalyn Menon; South Carolina – Jeanna Raney; Texas – Stacy James

=== Awards ===
Awards	Contestant
Gown	West Virginia - Danae DeMasi; Tennessee - Stephanie Culberson; Florida - Kelly Gaudet
Interview	Massachusetts - Abbie Lynne Rabine; (Washington, D.C.) District of Columbia - Marshawn Evans; Pennsylvania - Rosalyn Menon
Lifestyle and Fitness	(Georgia (U.S. state)) Georgia - Emily Foster; Massachusetts - Abbie Lynne Rabine; Tennessee - Stephanie Culberson
Talent	Oregon - Katie Harman; (Washington, D.C.) District of Columbia - Marshawn Evans; Mississippi - Becky Pruett

==== Quality of Life award ====
Results	Contestant	Platform
Winner	Utah - Jaclyn Hunt	Organ, Eye, and Tissue Donation
1st runner-up	Maryland - Kelly Glorioso	Assistance Dogs for the Disabled
2nd runner-up	Mississippi - Becky Pruett	Tobacco Education and Awareness for Minors

== Delegates ==
State	Name	Hometown	Age^{1}	Talent	Placement	Awards	Notes
Alabama	Kelly Jones	Birmingham	24	Classical Piano, "Ballade No. 1 in G Minor"			
Alaska	Eugenia Primis	Eagle River	20	Classical Cello, "Allegro Appassionata"			
Arizona	Kapri Rose	Gilbert	19	Fiddle, "Orange Blossom Special"			
Arkansas	Jessie Ward	Prescott	21	Tap Dance, Michael Jackson Medley	Top 10		
California	Stephanie Baldwin	Fullerton	23	Vocal, "Time to Say Goodbye"	Top 20		
Colorado	Kelly Lynn McKee	Parker	22	Lyrical Dance, "Someone Like You" from Jekyll & Hyde			
Connecticut	Marissa Perez	Meriden	23	Vocal, "This Time Around"			
Delaware	Erin Cooper	Wyoming	22	Lyrical Ballet, "Book of Days"			
District of Columbia	Marshawn Evans	Arlington, VA	22	Rhythmic Dance Twirl, "I Will Survive"	3rd runner-up	Preliminary Talent, Preliminary Interview	Later a contestant in season 4 of The Apprentice
Florida	Kelly Gaudet	Miami	22	Lyrical Dance, "It's Time"	Top 10	Preliminary Gown	Miss Florida Teen USA 1996
Georgia	Emily Foster	Cornelia	23	Piano, "Majesty"		Preliminary Swimsuit	
Hawaii	Denby Dung	Honolulu	23	Soprano Saxophone, "G-Bop"			
Idaho	Christi Weible	Eagle	22	Dramatic Monologue			Sister of Miss Idaho USA 2004 Kimberly Weible
Illinois	Kristin Castillo	Macomb	18	Classical Violin, "Praeludium & Allegro"			
Indiana	Allison Hatcher	Evansville	24	Classical Piano, "Prelude in G Minor"	Top 20		
Iowa	Erin Smith	Bettendorf	20	Piano, "Khachaturian's Toccata"			
Kansas	Kimberlee Grice	Ulysees	23	Vocal, "At Last"			
Kentucky	Monica Hardin	Louisville	20	Vocal, "If You Believe" from The Wiz			
Louisiana	Kati Guyton	Bossier City	23	Classical Vocal, "Your Daddy's Son" from Ragtime			
Maine	Meranda Hafford	Washburn	20	Vocal, "Next Time I Love"			
Maryland	Kelly Glorioso	Hydes	21	Vocal, "I'm Afraid This Must Be Love"	Top 20	Quality of Life 1st runner-up	
Massachusetts	Abbie Lynne Rabine	Wenham	22	Vocal, "Via Dolorosa"	1st runner-up	Preliminary Swimsuit, Preliminary Interview	
Michigan	Stacy Essebagers	Whitehall	21	Clogging, Medley from Moulin Rouge!	Top 10		
Minnesota	Kari Knuttila	Detroit Lakes	21	Classical Piano, "Sonata in B Minor"			
Mississippi	Becky Pruett	Hattiesburg	22	Vocal, "Whatever Lola Wants"	Top 20	Preliminary Talent, Quality of Life 2nd runner-up	
Missouri	Jennifer Ann Hover	Springfield	22	Vocal, Medley "Somewhere" & "Over the Rainbow"	Top 20		
Montana	Kara Svennungsen	Shelby	22	Vocal, "On My Own"			
Nebraska	Christina Foehlinger	Ralston	21	Baton Twirling, Theme from Robin Hood: Prince of Thieves	Top 20		
Nevada	Ashley Huff	Las Vegas	21	Polynesian Dance, "Welcome to Polynesia"			Miss Nevada USA 2003
New Hampshire	Katherine Pike	Hooksett	24	Vocal, "You Are My Home" from The Scarlet Pimpernel			
New Jersey	Julie Barber	Vineland	24	Contemporary Ballet en Pointe, "Do You Wanna Dance"			
New Mexico	Marta Strzyzewski	Roswell	23	Classical Piano, "Revolutionary Etude"			
New York	Andrea Plummer	New York City	23	Lyrical Ballet en Pointe, "Forrest Gump Suite"	4th runner-up		
North Carolina	Ashley House	Dallas	21	Celtic Irish Dance, "Flames of Fire"			
North Dakota	Jillayne Mertens	Motley, MN	19	Vocal / Violin, "Look to the Rainbow" from Finian's Rainbow			
Ohio	Natalie Witwer	Dublin	19	Piano, "America the Beautiful"			
Oklahoma	Kaci Hundley	Enid	21	Vocal, "Crying"	Top 20		
Oregon	Katie Harman	Gresham	20	Classical Vocal, "O Mio Babbino Caro"	Winner	Preliminary Talent	
Pennsylvania	Rosalyn Menon	Hazleton	22	Classical Piano, "Piano Sonata in C Minor" by Ludwig van Beethoven	Top 20	Preliminary Interview	
Rhode Island	Jennifer D'Ambrosio	Providence	21	Vocal, "As If We Never Said Goodbye" from Sunset Boulevard			
South Carolina	Jeanna Raney	Inman	20	Tap Dance, "Kiss Me"	Top 20		
South Dakota	Alecia Zuehlke	Sioux Falls	23	Piano, "My Tribute" by Andraé Crouch			
Tennessee	Stephanie Culberson	Knoxville	21	Classical Piano, "Fantaisie-Impromptu"	2nd runner-up	Preliminary Swimsuit, Preliminary Gown	Miss Tennessee USA 2004
Texas	Stacy James	Texarkana	22	Character Vocal, "Man of La Mancha"	Top 20		
Utah	Jaclyn Hunt	Lehi	22	Classical Piano, "Piano Concerto No. 2" by Sergei Rachmaninoff	Top 10	Quality of Life	
Vermont	Amy Marie Johnson	Essex Junction	21	Classical Piano, "Impromptu"			
Virginia	Meghan Shanley	Virginia Beach	21	Vocal, "Big Time"			
Washington	Breann Parriot	Puyallup	23	Contemporary Ballet en Pointe, Music from "West Side Story"			Miss Washington USA 2003
West Virginia	Danae DeMasi	Morgantown	21	Ballet en Pointe, "Ravendhi"	Top 10	Preliminary Gown	
Wisconsin	Laura Margaret Herriot	Princeton	23	Vocal, "Oh, Lady Be Good!"			
Wyoming	Erin Empey	Casper	20	Ballet, "Cristofori's Dream" by David Lanz			

^{1} Age as of September 2001

== Controversy ==
Following the pageant, the parents of Miss America 2002 wrote an eight-page letter to the pageant's organizers complaining about mistreatment and fraudulent billing.
