= Fleener, Indiana =

- Unincorporated community
- Location within Indiana Location within the United States
- Coordinates: 39°16′57″N 86°24′45″W
- Country: United States
- State: Indiana
- County: Monroe
- Township: Benton
- Elevation: 643 ft (196 m)
- Time zone: UTC-5 (Eastern (EST))
  - Summer (DST): UTC-4 (EDT)
- ZIP code: 47468
- Area codes: 812, 930
- FIPS code: 18-23610
- GNIS feature ID: 434579

Fleener is an unincorporated community in Benton Township, Monroe County, in the U.S. state of Indiana.

== History ==
A post office was established at Fleener in 1886, and remained in operation until it was discontinued in 1912. The community was named after the Fleener family of settlers, with Isaac N. Fleener serving as postmaster.
