= Kirby, Indiana =

- Unincorporated community
- Location within Indiana Location within the United States
- Coordinates: 39°08′12″N 86°36′36″W
- Country: United States
- State: Indiana
- County: Monroe
- Township: Van Buren
- Elevation: 837 ft (255 m)
- Time zone: UTC-5 (Eastern (EST))
  - Summer (DST): UTC-4 (EDT)
- ZIP code: 47403
- Area codes: 812, 930
- FIPS code: 18-39915
- GNIS feature ID: 437350

Kirby is an unincorporated community in Van Buren Township, Monroe County, in the U.S. state of Indiana.

== Geography ==
Kirby is located just north of Indiana State Road 45, near Bloomington. The community lies 4 miles (6.4 km) from Bloomington, the county seat.

== History ==
The community was named after the Kirby family, who lived in the area.

The Kirby School, a one-room schoolhouse, opened in 1853, with 52 students. Land for a new school was purchased by Van Buren Township, from Benjamin F Williams, for a new Kirby school in 1859. The school districts in the area were renumbered at that time, with Kirby School being renumbered from #3 to #1. The Kirby School enrolled 31 in 1888. in the 1898–1899 school year, the Kirby School burned to the ground. It was replaced by a new building shortly thereafter.

In spring 1903 construction began on a railroad line through the area; the workers, many of them foreign-born, lived in shacks and bunk-houses in the area. The rail line was completed in 1906. Kirby became the location of a flag station on the Indianapolis Southern Railroad line. The Kirby station was one of two flag stations in the township (the other being the station at Elwren). In addition to railroad improvements, Indiana State Road 45 in the Kirby area was paved in 1929.

In 1909, the Kirby School was moved, in order to situate it more conveniently for the population.

The village of Kirby had 12 residents in 1920. The population had declined to just 2 in 1940. The Kirby School closed that year.

Today, Kirby is the location of the Monroe County, Indiana Airport. This airport opened in 1942.

== See also ==
- Yellowstone, Indiana
