= Smithville-Sanders, Indiana =

- Census-designated place
- Location in Monroe County, Indiana
- Coordinates: 39°03′34″N 86°29′52″W
- Country: United States
- State: Indiana
- County: Monroe
- Townships: Clear Creek, Perry

Area
  - Total: 10.72 sq mi (27.76 km^{2})
  - Land: 10.72 sq mi (27.76 km^{2})
  - Water: 0 sq mi (0.00 km^{2})
- Elevation: 715 ft (218 m)

Population (2020)
  - Total: 3,323
  - Density: 310/sq mi (119.7/km^{2})
- Time zone: UTC-5 (Eastern (EST))
  - Summer (DST): UTC-4 (EDT)
- ZIP codes: 47458, 47401 (Bloomington)
- Area codes: 812 & 930
- GNIS feature ID: 2583471
- FIPS code: 18-70330

Smithville-Sanders is a census-designated place (CDP) encompassing the communities of Smithville and Sanders in Monroe County, Indiana, United States. Its population was 3,323 as of the 2020 census.

== Geography ==
Smithville-Sanders is located in southern Monroe County. The village of Smithville is in the north-central part of the CDP around the intersection of Smithville Road and Strain Ridge Road, while Sanders is 0.5 miles (0.8 km) to the north on Fairfax Road. Most of the CDP consists of rural and semi-suburban land surrounding the two villages.

According to the U.S. Census Bureau, the CDP has an area of 10.72 square miles (27.8 km^{2}), all of it land. It is bordered to the south and east by portions of Monroe Lake, a reservoir on Salt Creek. To the west it is bordered partly by Little Clear Creek, part of the Salt Creek watershed, and partly by Indiana State Road 37, which leads north 7 miles (11 km) to Bloomington and south 16 miles (26 km) to Bedford.

== Demographics ==
Historical population
Census	Pop.	Note	%±
2010	3,184		—
2020	3,323		4.4%
U.S. Decennial Census

=== 2020 census ===
As of the 2020 census, Smithville-Sanders had a population of 3,323. The median age was 47.2 years. 18.4% of residents were under the age of 18 and 18.9% of residents were 65 years of age or older. For every 100 females there were 96.2 males, and for every 100 females age 18 and over there were 96.1 males age 18 and over.

9.1% of residents lived in urban areas, while 90.9% lived in rural areas.

There were 1,520 households in Smithville-Sanders, of which 25.3% had children under the age of 18 living in them. Of all households, 49.5% were married-couple households, 20.6% were households with a male householder and no spouse or partner present, and 22.3% were households with a female householder and no spouse or partner present. About 33.0% of all households were made up of individuals and 11.5% had someone living alone who was 65 years of age or older.

There were 1,895 housing units, of which 19.8% were vacant. The homeowner vacancy rate was 3.3% and the rental vacancy rate was 10.9%.

Racial composition as of the 2020 census
Race	Number	Percent
White	3,061	92.1%
Black or African American	37	1.1%
American Indian and Alaska Native	2	0.1%
Asian	38	1.1%
Native Hawaiian and Other Pacific Islander	0	0.0%
Some other race	16	0.5%
Two or more races	169	5.1%
Hispanic or Latino (of any race)	74	2.2%
