= Clear Creek Township, Monroe County, Indiana =

Clear Creek Township
- Township
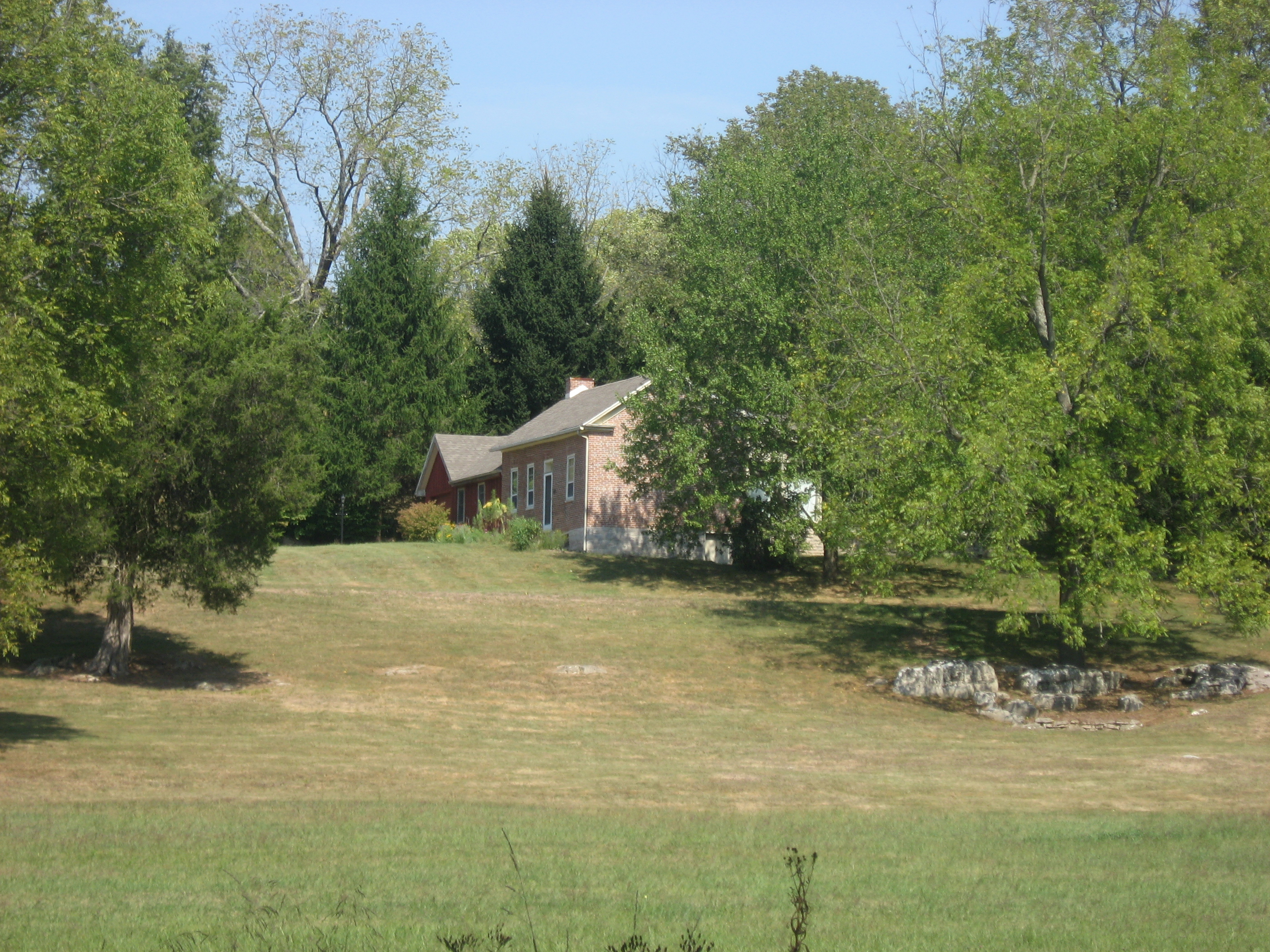
- A farmhouse in northern Clear Creek Township
- Motto: Busiest Little Township in Indiana
- Location in Monroe County
- Coordinates: 39°02′01″N 86°30′56″W
- Country: United States
- State: Indiana
- County: Monroe

Government
  - Type: Indiana township
  - Trustee: Thelma Kelley Jeffries

Area
  - Total: 37.9 sq mi (98 km^{2})
  - Land: 30.87 sq mi (80.0 km^{2})
  - Water: 7.03 sq mi (18.2 km^{2}) 18.55%
- Elevation: 702 ft (214 m)

Population (2020)
  - Total: 5,309
  - Density: 162/sq mi (63/km^{2})
- Time zone: UTC-5 (Eastern (EST))
  - Summer (DST): UTC-4 (EDT)
- ZIP codes: 47401, 47403, 47436, 47462
- Area codes: 812, 930
- GNIS feature ID: 453222
- Website: clearcreektwp.com

Clear Creek Township is one of eleven townships in Monroe County, Indiana, United States. As of the 2010 census, its population was 5,000 and it contained 2,674 housing units.

== History ==
Joseph Mitchell House was listed on the National Register of Historic Places in 1986.

== Geography ==
According to the 2010 census, the township has a total area of 37.9 square miles (98 km^{2}), of which 30.87 square miles (80.0 km^{2}) (or 81.45%) is land and 7.03 square miles (18.2 km^{2}) (or 18.55%) is water.

=== Unincorporated towns ===
- Fairfax at 39.008105°N 86.48055°W
- Harrodsburg at 39.013382°N 86.544996°W
- Smithville at 39.071159°N 86.50694°W
- Smithville-Sanders (part)

(This list is based on USGS data and may include former settlements.)

Monroe County's Clear Creek Town is not located in Clear Creek Township, but rather in Perry Township, just north of Clear Creek Township's border. Both the town and the township are named after the same eponymous creek, which flows from the north to the south through both of them.

=== Cemeteries ===
Clear Creek Township Trustee's Office (Township Government) operates three active cemeteries, which includes the marking and selling of plots, marking for headstones, meeting with family members and marking burial sites for their family member, all maintenance, mowing and trimming, filling in grave sites, removing funeral floral arrangements, leveling and sowing grass seed and straw, cleaning up after rain and/or wind storms which blow flowers off grave sites.

Clear Creek Township Trustee's Office (Township Government) has an additional 26 cemeteries in the township. Four cemeteries were moved due to the construction of Lake Monroe.

Deeds are recorded in office of the Recorder of Monroe County. Thelma Kelley Jeffries is the trustee of the township.

Clear Creek Township contains 29 cemeteries.

=== Major highways ===
- Indiana State Road 37

== School districts ==
- Monroe County Community School Corporation

== Political districts ==
- Indiana's 9th congressional district
- State House District 60
- State Senate District 44
