= Monroe County Library =

Monroe County Library may refer to:

- Monroe County Public Library in Monroe County, Indiana
- The Monroe County Library branch of the Flint River Regional Library System
