= Joseph Mitchell House =

Historic building in Indiana, USA

- U.S. National Register of Historic Places
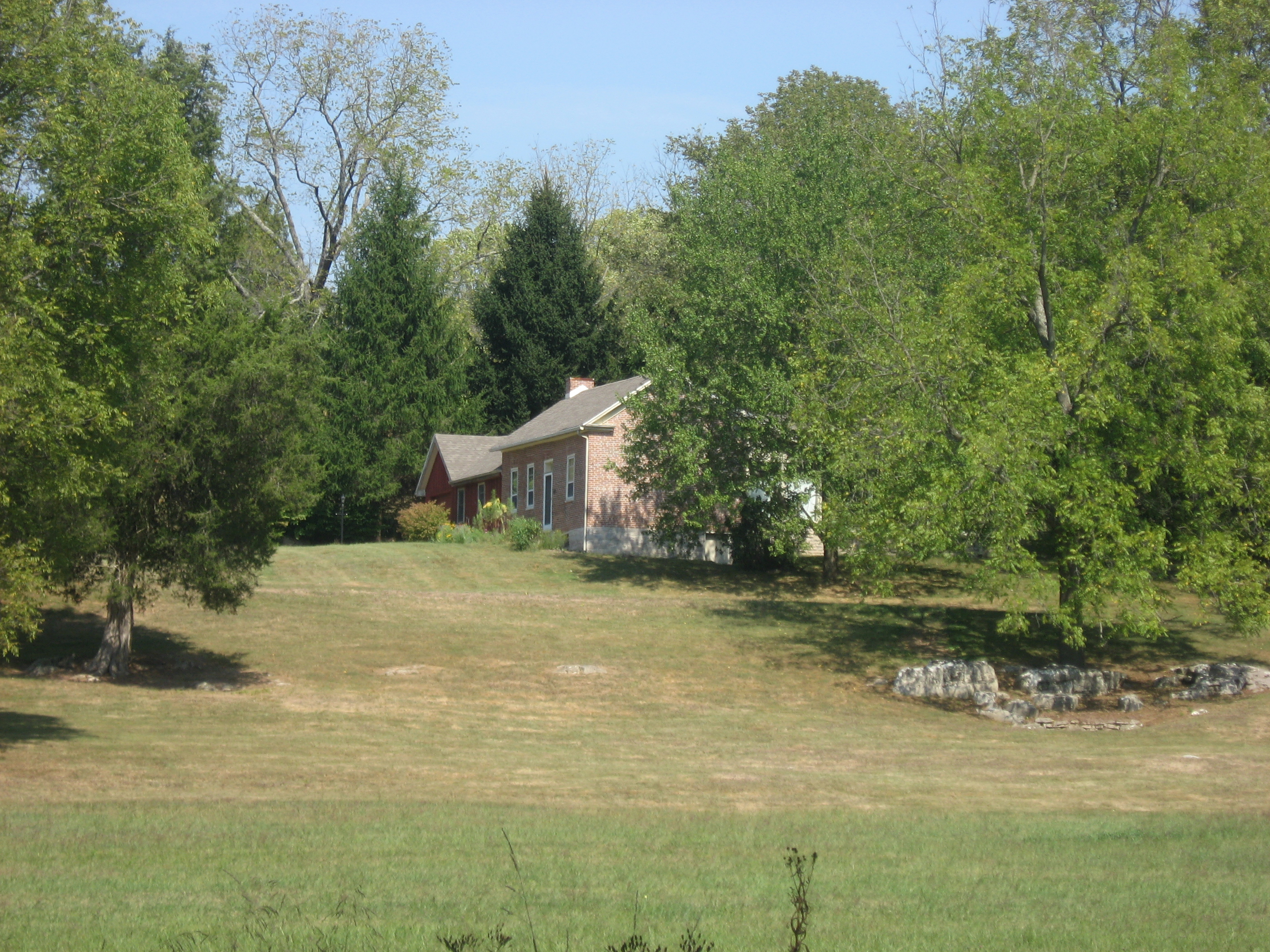
- Roadside view of the house

- Location within Indiana Location within the United States
- Nearest city: Smithville, Monroe County, Indiana
- Coordinates: 39°4′21″N 86°32′58″W
- Area: 5 acres (2.0 ha)
- Built: 1835
- Architectural style: Federal
- NRHP reference No.: 86001268
- Added to NRHP: June 13, 1986

The Joseph Mitchell House is a historic residence in southern Monroe County, Indiana, United States. Located on Ketcham Road west of the community of Smithville, it is one of the oldest houses in Monroe County, and it has been designated a historic site.

== History ==
In 1823, Kentucky resident Joseph Mitchell was awarded a land grant in present-day Monroe County in return for his service in the War of 1812. Six years later he moved his family to the site; here he built a log cabin, but as the years passed, it became insufficient for the family's needs. Accordingly, Mitchell constructed the present brick house in 1835, adding its final details two years later; the clay for its bricks was dug on his farm, and the bricks were fired in a kiln adjacent to the house site. After living in the house for fifteen years, Mitchell and his family moved to Iowa; they sold the property to Joseph's younger brother John, and it remained in the ownership of the Mitchell family until 1922. Starting in that year, it began to pass through the hands of several different owners before being purchased by longtime owners William and Nelda Christ in 1973; as of 2011, they still owned the property.

== Construction ==
Mitchell built his house in the shape of the letter "L," one story high and in the Federal style of architecture. The building rests on a foundation of rubble masonry, and it is covered with a gabled roof with eaves and boxed cornices. The roof appears to have been built originally with wooden shingles, although the present shingles are now made of asphalt.

On the first floor, the house features a main facade that looks toward the west; four bays wide, it includes three large windows and an off-center door; the original windows were replaced in the 1980s in a fashion similar to the originals. Toward the south, there are no windows and only a single doorway, which allows access to the basement; the plain gabled wall appears once to have been hidden by a porch that was removed due to structural deterioration. Toward the east, only one small window allows light into the house, while the northern end is unpierced by windows. The interior of the "L" lies north and east of the house; multiple doors and windows open onto it.

Inside, the house is divided into four rooms: a parlor, a bedroom, a "keeping room," and the kitchen. Soon after the house was constructed, a frame addition was constructed on the house's northern end; it included a loft in which family members once slept. Significant elements of the interior include four large fireplaces, large mantels, ornate trim, and white-painted poplar wood. Its floor plan is typical of the "hall-and-parlor" style of house, which typically features two large rooms or two pairs of rooms.

== Recognition ==
In 1986, the Joseph Mitchell House was listed on the National Register of Historic Places. As the third-oldest house in Monroe County, it was deemed significant primarily because of its architecture, despite the presence of alterations such as the removal of the original porch. It is part of a group of historic houses on Ketcham Road, although it is the oldest and most historically significant of them, and it is one of more than forty National Register-listed properties and historic districts countywide.
