= Dave Askins =

Dave Askins (born c. 1964) is an American journalist and the founder of the two digital papers, the Ann Arbor Chronicle (2008-14) and Bloomington, Indiana's B Square Bulletin (2018-24, 2025-present), both papers known for their in-depth coverage of local government matters allowing residents access to otherwise difficult information to obtain, allow them to more easily hold local government to account. In 2014, the Chronicle successfully sued the city of Ann Arbor for holding closed sessions meetings in violation of the Open Meetings Act. The B Square Bulletin shut down in late 2024 but relaunched in 2025 amid public support.

== Early life ==
Askins was born in Columbus, Indiana about 1964, the son of Larry and Betty Askins. He graduated from Columbus North High School in 1982. Askins was a delivery boy for the Louisville Courier-Journal from 1974 to 1980.

He obtained a bachelor's degree in mathematics, then studied German linguistics at Indiana University in the late 1980s. He met his wife, Mary Morgan, in Bloomington when they both attended graduate school at Indiana University. They married in 1989.

== Career ==
Askins' career took him first to China, where the couple taught English to medical professionals, before moving to Rochester, New York, where Askins resumed his graduate studies. The couple moved to Ann Arbor, Michigan in the 1990s when Morgan was offered a job at the Ann Arbor News.

=== Ann Arbor Chronicle ===
On 2 September 2008, Askins and his wife Mary, founded the for-profit, digital newspaper, the Ann Arbor Chronicle. The paper was her brainchild, known for its in-depth coverage of local government matters, including city government meetings, the planning commission, city boards, and local election results. In addition to Askins and his wife, the paper had seven contributing freelancers. The paper brought in revenue of about $100,000. In 2011, Askins and the Chronicle sued the city for holding closed sessions meetings in violation of the Open Meetings Act. That lawsuit failed at the first hurdle, but a 2014 lawsuit by Askins on similar grounds was more successful. The couple shut down the Chronicle on 2 September 2014 after six years citing work-life balance with the paper being "all consuming".

In Ann Arbor, Askins also ran a blog called the Teeter Talk where he interviewed locals.

=== B Square Bulletin ===
In 2017, Askins moved to Madison, South Dakota to work for the Madison Daily Leader. Askins was working in a newsroom in Pierre, South Dakota in 2018 for the Pierre Capital Journal. His wife returned to Bloomington and Askins followed her there.

Unable, however, to find a job, he founded the B Square Beacon which became a leading media outlet covering city government like the Chronicle. The site operated on a donations basis and was run on about $3,000 per month raised from approximately 500 donors. The site was renamed the B Square Bulletin in 2021. After 5 years, Askins wrapped up the site on 20 December 2024 citing the heavy workload.

The county library is exploring options for archiving the newspaper, with Askins agreeing to cover the cost of hosting until an archive can be secured.
