= Polk Township, Monroe County, Indiana =

Polk Township
- Township
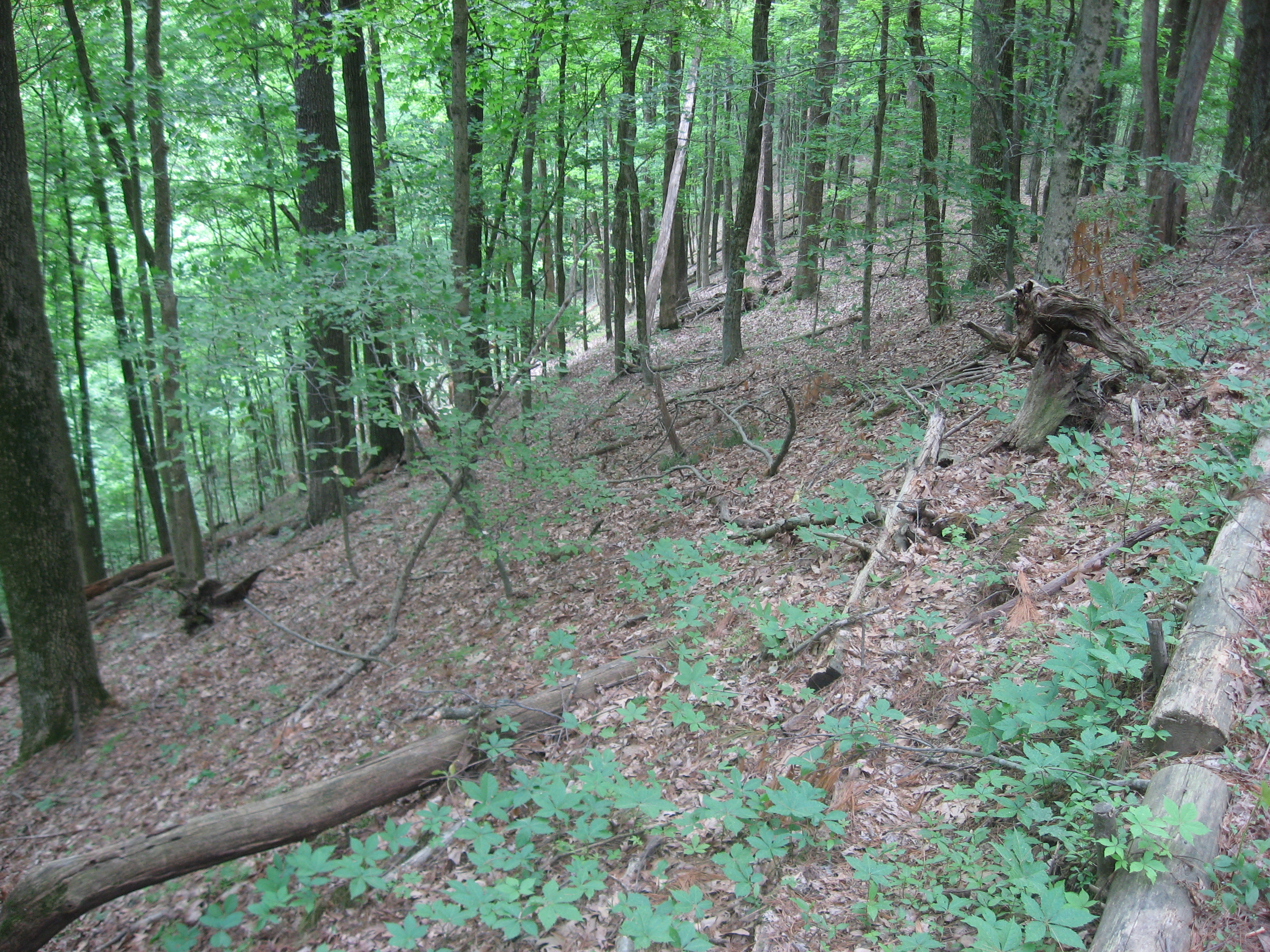
- Hilly countryside in the Hoosier National Forest

- Location in Monroe County
- Coordinates: 39°01′25″N 86°24′17″W
- Country: United States
- State: Indiana
- County: Monroe

Government
  - Type: Indiana township

Area
  - Total: 38.79 sq mi (100.5 km^{2})
  - Land: 34.16 sq mi (88.5 km^{2})
  - Water: 4.63 sq mi (12.0 km^{2}) 11.94%
- Elevation: 660 ft (200 m)

Population (2020)
  - Total: 304
  - Density: 10.5/sq mi (4.1/km^{2})
- Time zone: UTC-5 (Eastern (EST))
  - Summer (DST): UTC-4 (EDT)
- ZIP codes: 47264, 47401, 47436
- Area codes: 812, 930
- GNIS feature ID: 453756

Polk Township is one of eleven townships in Monroe County, Indiana. As of the 2010 census, its population was 360 and it contained 195 housing units. It is one of the least densely populated townships in the state; this is largely because most of the land is occupied by Lake Monroe, the Hoosier National Forest, and seasonal homes and attractions.

== History ==
Polk Township was established in 1849. It was established soon after the term of its namesake, James K. Polk, had ended.

Epsilon II Archaeological Site and Kappa V Archaeological Site are listed on the National Register of Historic Places.

== Geography ==
According to the 2010 census, the township has a total area of 38.79 square miles (100.5 km^{2}), of which 34.16 square miles (88.5 km^{2}) (or 88.06%) is land and 4.63 square miles (12.0 km^{2}) (or 11.94%) is water.

=== Unincorporated towns ===
- Chapel Hill at 38.998383°N 86.44916°W
- Yellowstone at 38.998939°N 86.34249°W

(This list is based on USGS data and may include former settlements.)

=== Cemeteries ===
The township contains these four cemeteries: Burgoon Church, Hillenburg, Mitchell and Todd.

== School districts ==
- Monroe County Community School Corporation

== Political districts ==
- Indiana's 9th congressional district
- State House District 60
- State Senate District 44
