= Chapel Hill, Indiana =

- Unincorporated community
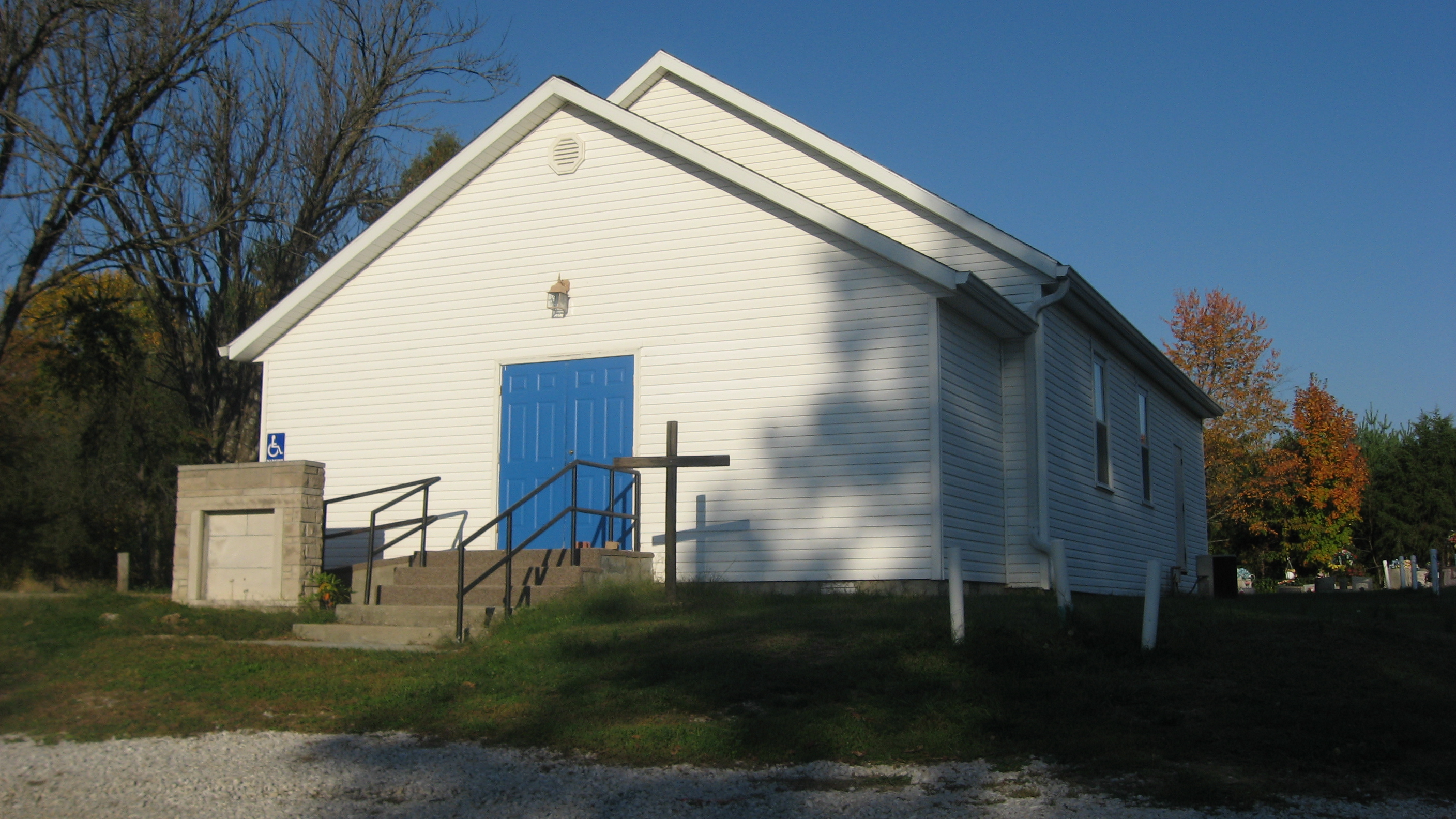
- Pentecostal church

- Location within Indiana Location within the United States
- Coordinates: 38°59′54″N 86°26′57″W
- Country: United States
- State: Indiana
- County: Monroe
- Township: Polk
- Elevation: 774 ft (236 m)
- Time zone: UTC-5 (Eastern (EST))
  - Summer (DST): UTC-4 (EDT)
- ZIP code: 47436
- Area codes: 812, 930
- GNIS feature ID: 450765

Chapel Hill is an unincorporated community in Polk Township, Monroe County, in the U.S. state of Indiana.

== History ==
Chapel Hill was platted in 1856. The community took its name from the Chapel Hill Methodist Church located there. The community ultimately would fail to grow to its founders' expectations. A post office was established at Chapel Hill in 1897, and remained in operation until it was discontinued in 1925.
