= Clear Creek, Indiana =

- Unincorporated community
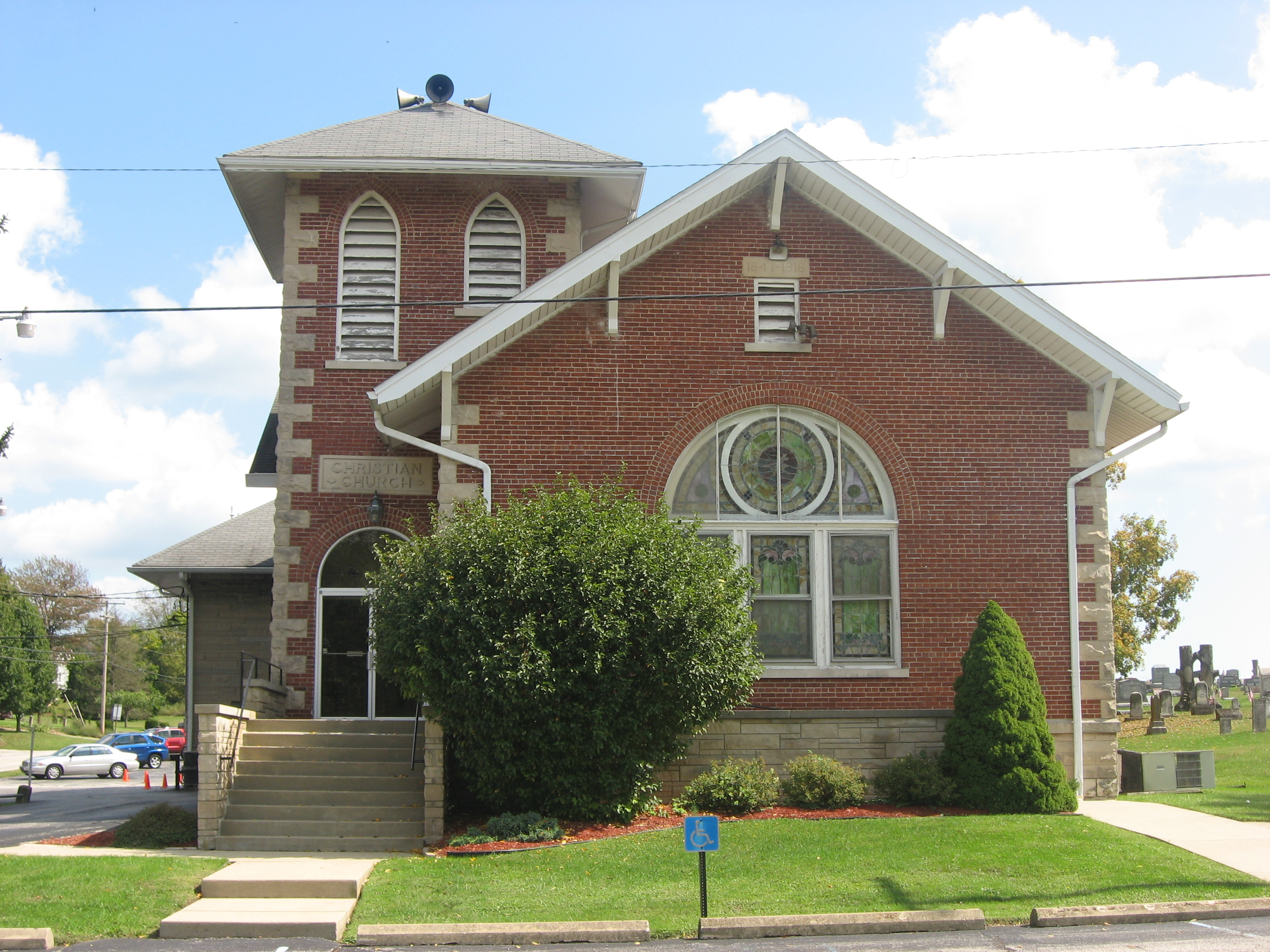
- Clear Creek Christian Church, established in 1839

- Location within Indiana Location within the United States
- Coordinates: 39°06′33″N 86°32′24″W
- Country: United States
- State: Indiana
- County: Monroe
- Township: Perry
- Named after: Clear Creek (Indiana)
- Elevation: 663 ft (202 m)
- Time zone: UTC-5 (Eastern (EST))
  - Summer (DST): UTC-4 (EDT)
- ZIP code: 47426
- Area codes: 812, 930
- FIPS code: 18-13402
- GNIS feature ID: 449639

Clear Creek is an unincorporated community in Perry Township, Monroe County, in the U.S. state of Indiana. It is named after the eponymous creek.

== History ==
The post office at Clear Creek has been in operation since 1870.

== Geography ==
Clear Creek is located just south of the city of Bloomington.

== See also ==
- Clear Creek Township, Monroe County, Indiana - located just south of Clear Creek Town, and named after the same creek.
