= Knight Ridge, Indiana =

- Unincorporated community
- Location within Indiana Location within the United States
- Coordinates: 39°07′31″N 86°25′59″W
- Country: United States
- State: Indiana
- County: Monroe
- Township: Salt Creek
- Elevation: 817 ft (249 m)
- Time zone: UTC-5 (Eastern (EST))
  - Summer (DST): UTC-4 (EDT)
- ZIP code: 47401
- Area codes: 812, 930
- GNIS feature ID: 437389

Knight Ridge is an unincorporated community in Salt Creek Township, Monroe County, in the U.S. state of Indiana.

== History ==
The name of the community honors the Knight family of settlers.
