= Washington Township, Monroe County, Indiana =

Washington Township, Indiana
- Township
- Washington Township
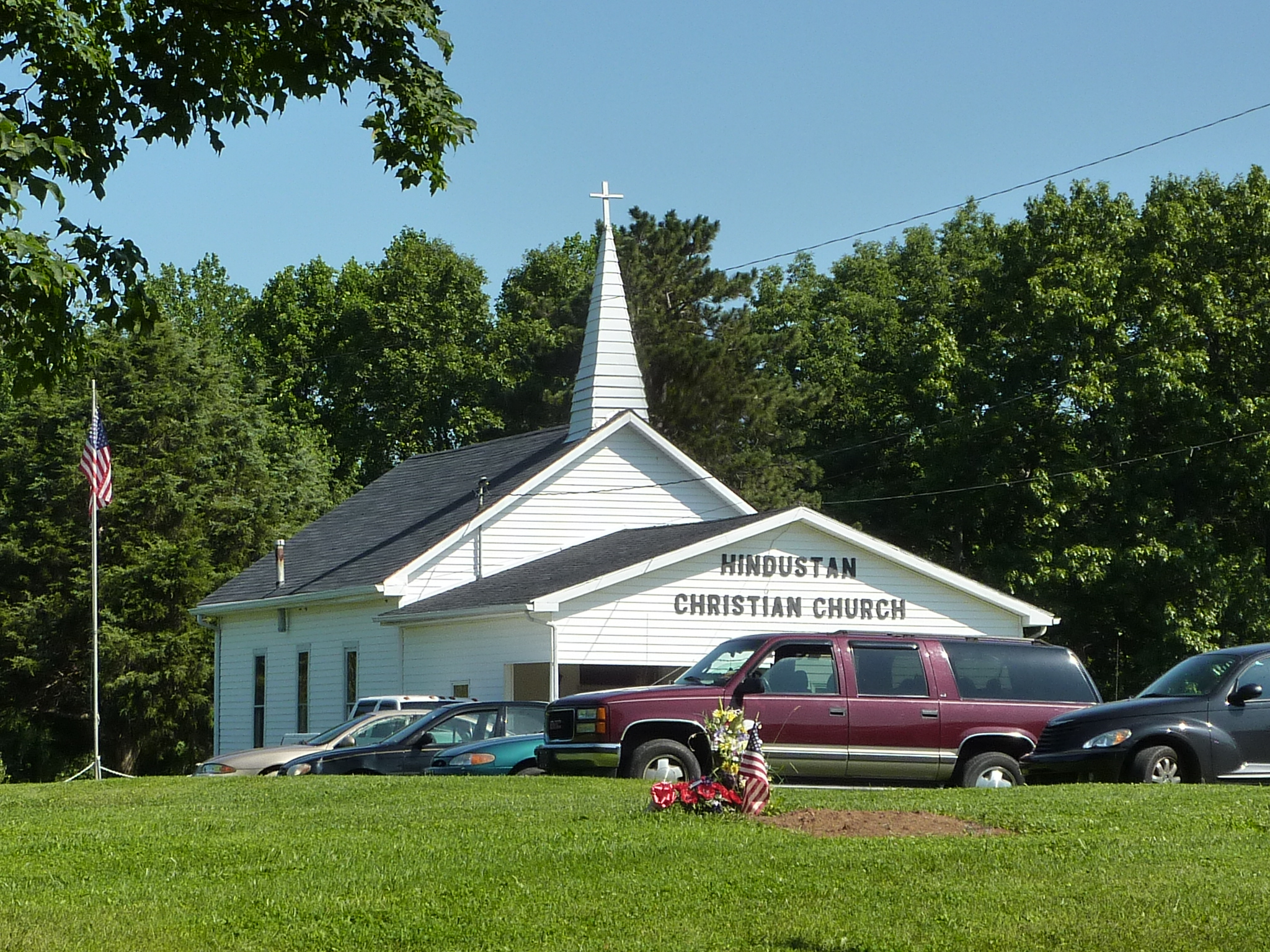
- A historic church in the township

- Location in Monroe County
- Coordinates: 39°17′46″N 86°31′08″W
- Country: United States
- State: Indiana
- County: Monroe

Government
  - Type: Indiana township

Area
  - Total: 34.24 sq mi (88.7 km^{2})
  - Land: 34.23 sq mi (88.7 km^{2})
  - Water: 0.01 sq mi (0.026 km^{2}) 0.03%
- Elevation: 790 ft (240 m)

Population (2020)
  - Total: 1,977
  - Density: 59.3/sq mi (22.9/km^{2})
- Time zone: UTC-5 (Eastern (EST))
  - Summer (DST): UTC-4 (EDT)
- ZIP codes: 46151, 47404, 47408, 47433
- Area codes: 812, 930
- GNIS feature ID: 454007
- Website: www.washtownship-in.org

Washington Township is one of eleven townships in Monroe County, Indiana, United States. As of the 2010 census, its population was 2,029 and it contained 882 housing units. The township contains a portion of the Morgan-Monroe State Forest.

== History ==
Washington Township was established in 1829. It was named for George Washington, the first President of the United States.

== Geography ==
According to the 2010 census, the township has a total area of 34.24 square miles (88.7 km^{2}), of which 34.23 square miles (88.7 km^{2}) (or 99.97%) is land and 0.01 square miles (0.026 km^{2}) (or 0.03%) is water.

=== Unincorporated towns ===
- Hindustan at 39.308103°N 86.483329°W
- Wayport at 39.266158°N 86.520831°W

(This list is based on USGS data and may include former settlements.)

=== Cemeteries ===
The township contains these two cemeteries: Collier and Sample.

=== Major highways ===
- Interstate 69
- Indiana State Road 37

=== Lakes ===
- Bryant Creek Lake

== School districts ==
- Monroe County Community School Corporation

== Political districts ==
- Indiana's 9th congressional district
- State House District 61
- State Senate District 37
