= Monroe Carnegie Library =

- U.S. National Register of Historic Places
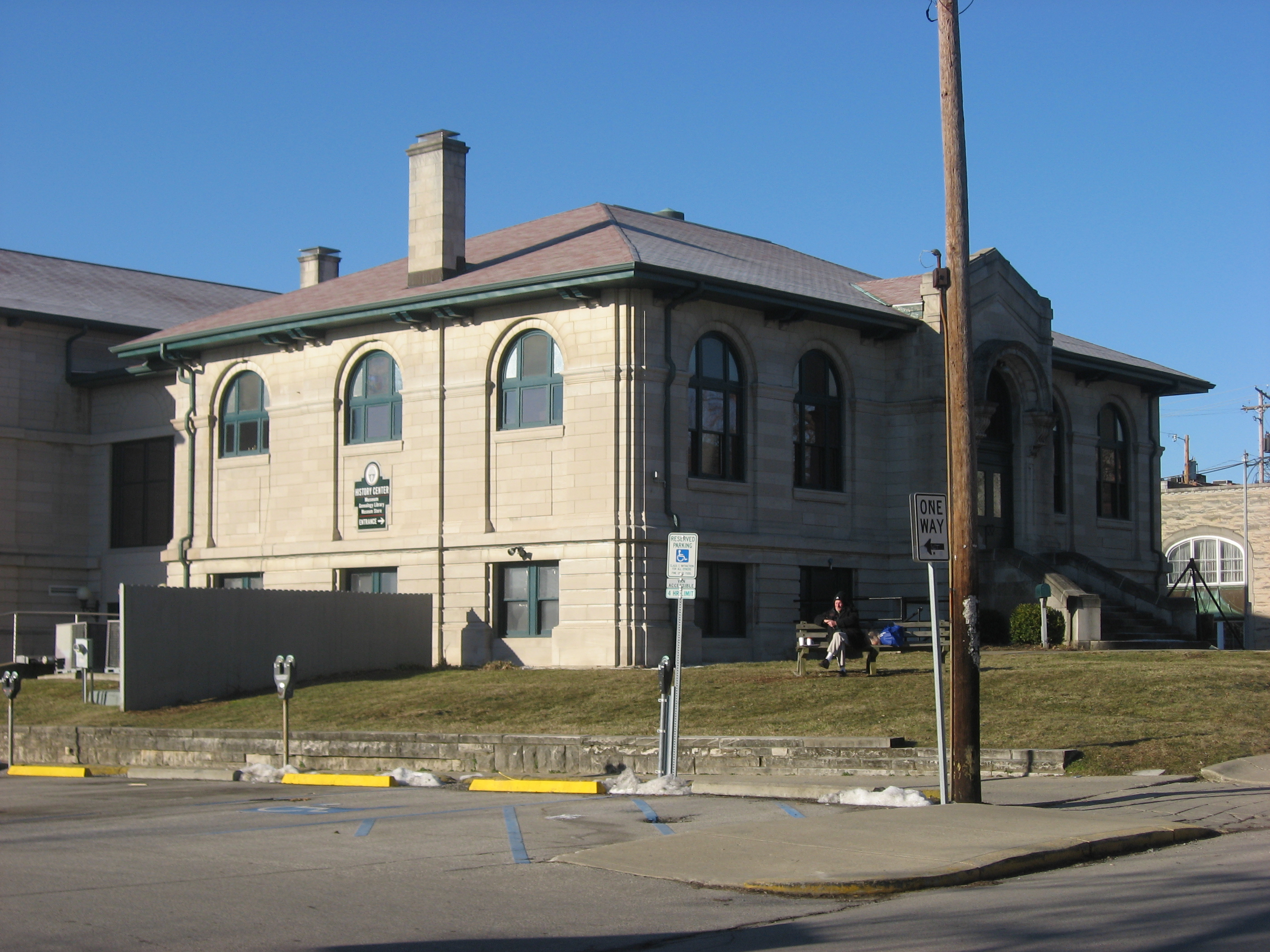
- Monroe Carnegie Library, March 2010

- Location within Indiana Location within the United States
- Location: 200 E. 6th St., Bloomington, Indiana
- Coordinates: 39°10′3″N 86°31′54″W
- Area: less than one acre
- Built: 1917
- Architect: Parker, Wilson B. Parker; John M. Weaver
- Architectural style: Classical Revival, Neo-Classical
- NRHP reference No.: 78000025
- Added to NRHP: March 8, 1978

Monroe Carnegie Library, also known as Old Monroe Carnegie Library, is a historic Carnegie library located at Bloomington, Indiana. It was built in 1917, and is a one-story, rectangular, Neoclassical style limestone building on a raised basement. The Monroe County History Center is a history museum the historic library building that was established as a Carnegie library. The museum is located on the site of Center School in the former Bloomington Public Library building. The library building is now home to the Monroe County Historical Society, their collection of artifacts, and their Genealogy Library. A historical marker is present at the site. The History Center is located at 202 East 6th Street. It is a tourist attraction.

The building measures approximately 50 feet by 40 feet, and has a two-story concrete block addition built in 1955. It features arched windows and a projecting arched entryway topped by a pagoda style roof. It was constructed with a $31,000 grant from the Carnegie Foundation. It was listed on the National Register of Historic Places in 1978.

The Monroe County Public Library vacated the building in 1970; by 1978 and through the 1980s it was used by various nonprofits. On April 27, 1985 Glenn Danzig's Deathrock band Samhain (band) performed there during their Unholy Passion EP tour. Since 1994, the former library houses the Monroe County Historical Society.
