= Van Buren Township, Monroe County, Indiana =

Van Buren Township
- Township
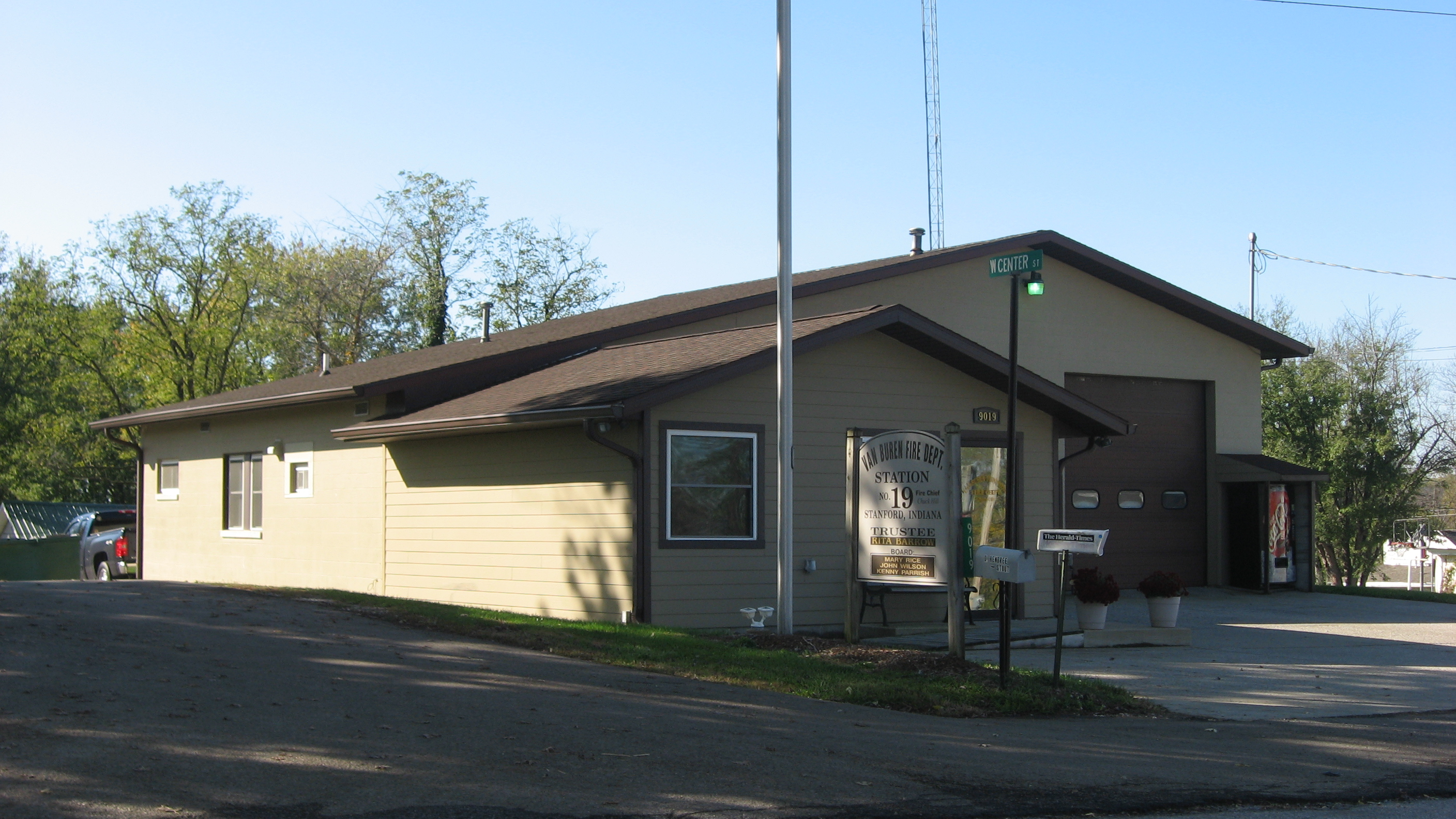
- Township hall, located in Stanford

- Location in Monroe County
- Coordinates: 39°07′23″N 86°37′58″W
- Country: United States
- State: Indiana
- County: Monroe

Government
  - Type: Indiana township
  - Trustee: Rita Barrow

Area
  - Total: 34.85 sq mi (90.3 km^{2})
  - Land: 34.85 sq mi (90.3 km^{2})
  - Water: 0 sq mi (0 km^{2}) 0%
- Elevation: 820 ft (250 m)

Population (2020)
  - Total: 12,802
  - Density: 343.8/sq mi (132.7/km^{2})
- Time zone: UTC-5 (Eastern (EST))
  - Summer (DST): UTC-4 (EDT)
- ZIP codes: 47403, 47404
- Area codes: 812, 930
- GNIS feature ID: 453950
- Website: www.vanburentownship.org

Van Buren Township is one of eleven townships in Monroe County, Indiana, United States. As of the 2010 census, its population was 11,981 and it contained 5,347 housing units.

== History ==
Van Buren Township was established in 1837.

== Geography ==
According to the 2010 census, the township has a total area of 34.85 square miles (90.3 km^{2}), all land.

=== Cities, towns, villages ===
- Bloomington (west edge)

=== Unincorporated towns ===
- Elwren at 39.108658°N 86.669723°W
- Garden Acres at 39.124492°N 86.578054°W
- Highland Village at 39.160880°N 86.58361°W
- Kirby at 39.136714°N 86.609999°W
- Leonard Springs at 39.140603°N 86.577221°W
- Stanford at 39.089769°N 86.666668°W

(This list is based on USGS data and may include former settlements.)

=== Cemeteries ===
The township contains these cemeteries: Blair, Brown, Bunger/Ward, Cole/County Farm, Coon, Duncan, Eller, Fullerton, Garrison Chapel, Goss, Green, Harmony, Iseminger, Jones/Patterson, Keller/Meredith, Kern, Kerr, Koontz/May, Parsons, Reeves, and South Union Church.

=== Major highways ===
- Indiana State Road 45

=== Airports and landing strips ===
- Monroe County Airport

== School districts ==
- Monroe County Community School Corporation

== Political districts ==
- Indiana's 9th Congressional district
- State House District 62
- State Senate District 40
