= Handy, Monroe County, Indiana =

Handy
- Unincorporated community
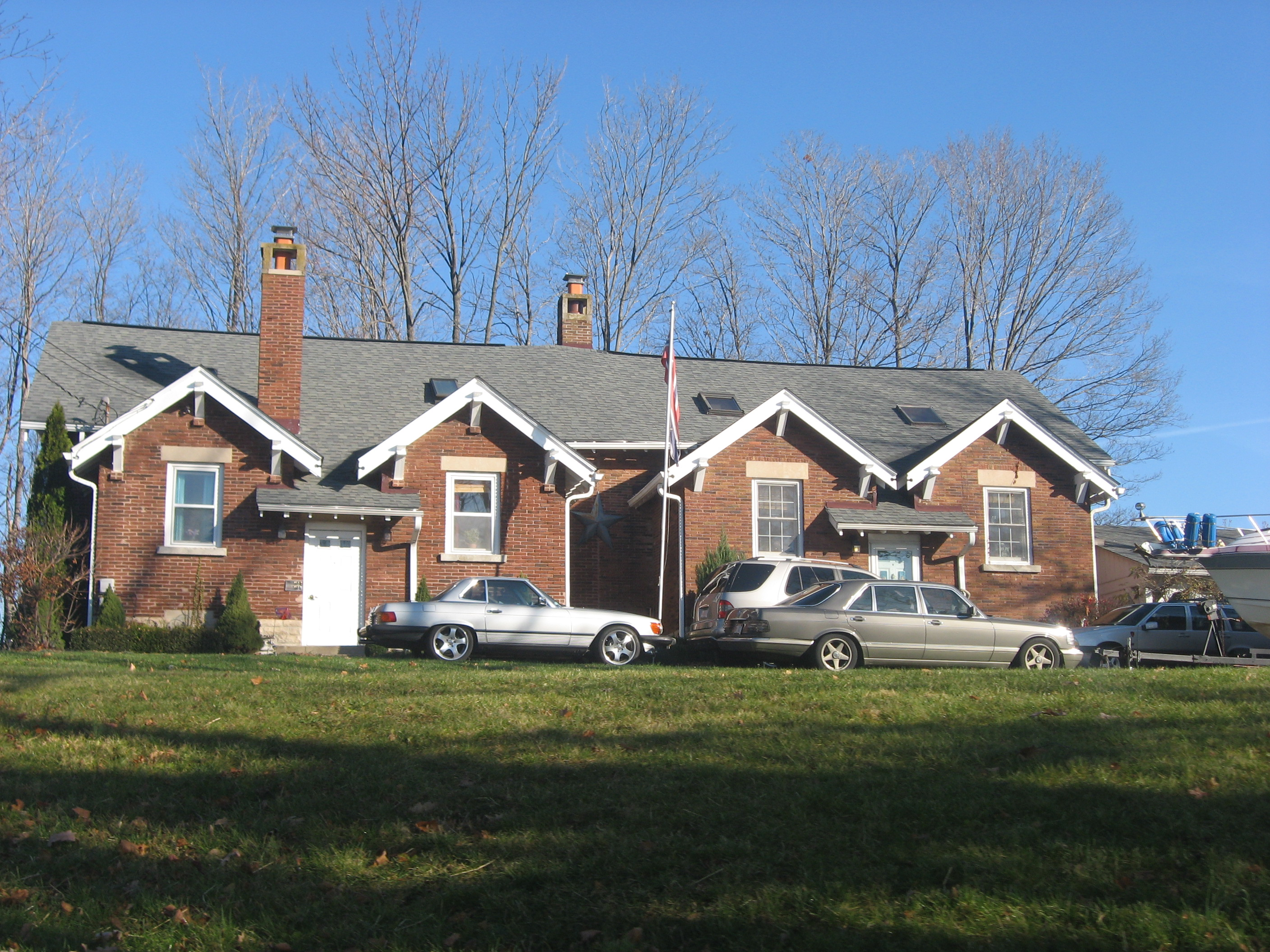
- The former Handy School

- Location within Indiana Location within the United States
- Coordinates: 39°05′45″N 86°29′38″W
- Country: United States
- State: Indiana
- County: Monroe
- Township: Perry
- Elevation: 761 ft (232 m)
- Time zone: UTC-5 (Eastern (EST))
  - Summer (DST): UTC-4 (EDT)
- ZIP code: 47401
- Area codes: 812, 930
- FIPS code: 18-31108
- GNIS feature ID: 451004

Handy is an unincorporated community in Perry Township, Monroe County, in the U.S. state of Indiana.

== History ==
According to Ronald L. Baker, the community was probably named after Joseph D. Handy, a county commissioner.
