= Wayport, Indiana =

- Unincorporated community
- Location within Indiana Location within the United States
- Coordinates: 39°15′58″N 86°31′15″W
- Country: United States
- State: Indiana
- County: Monroe
- Township: Washington
- Elevation: 784 ft (239 m)
- Time zone: UTC-5 (Eastern (EST))
  - Summer (DST): UTC-4 (EDT)
- ZIP code: 47404
- Area codes: 812, 930
- GNIS feature ID: 452127

Wayport is an unincorporated community in Washington Township, Monroe County, in the U.S. state of Indiana.

== History ==
Wayport was platted in 1851. In its heyday, the town had a post office, a blacksmith shop, and a general store. The post office operated from 1877 to 1879.

Construction on I-69 impacted several gas stations and businesses in Wayport. Most were shut down by the end of 2018.
