= Stanford, Indiana =

- Census-designated place
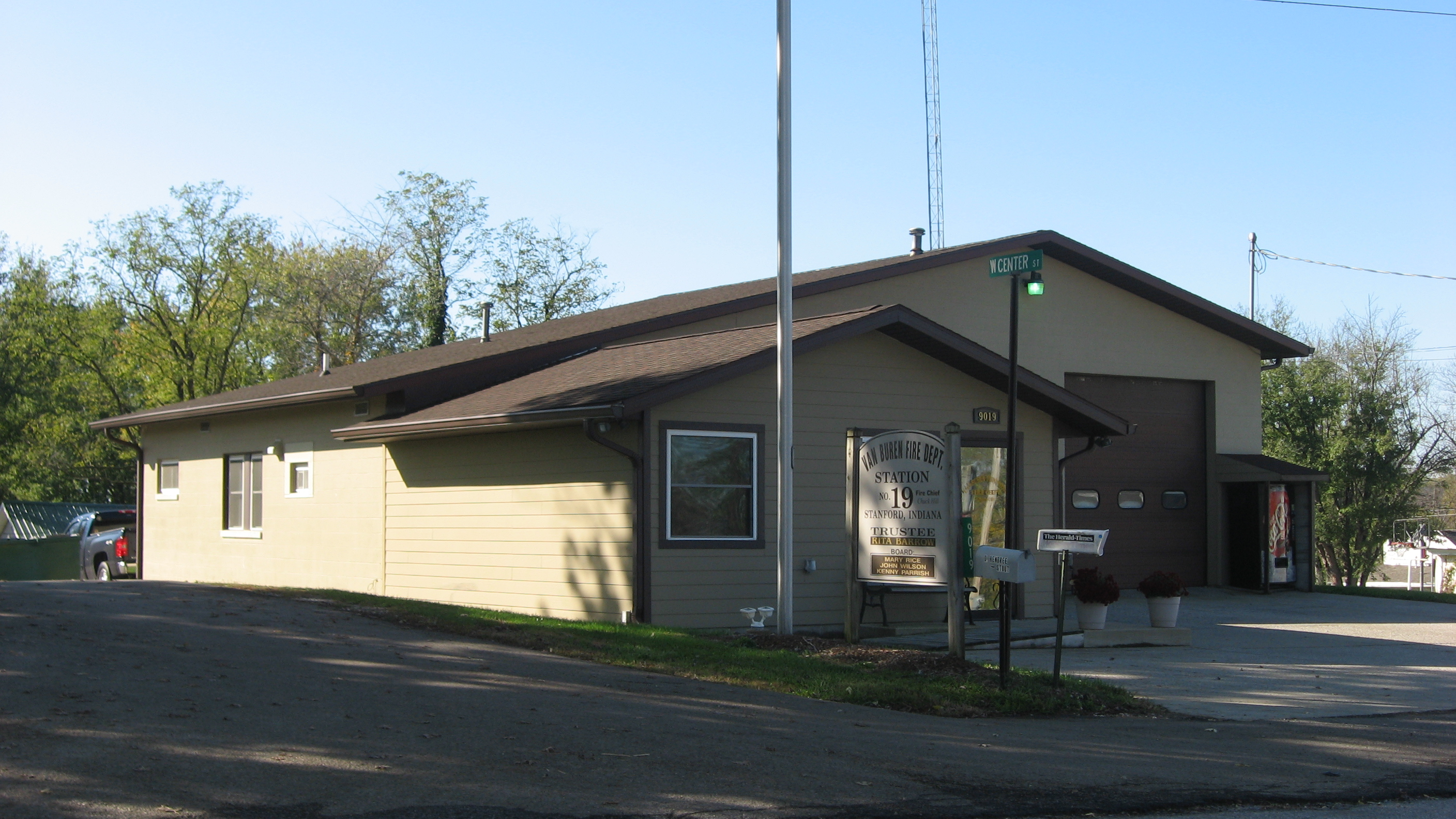
- Van Buren Township Hall

- Location within Indiana Location within the United States
- Coordinates: 39°05′31″N 86°39′52″W
- Country: United States
- State: Indiana
- County: Monroe
- Township: Van Buren

Area
  - Total: 1.76 sq mi (4.6 km^{2})
  - Land: 1.76 sq mi (4.6 km^{2})
  - Water: 0.0 sq mi (0 km^{2})
- Elevation: 761 ft (232 m)
- Time zone: UTC-5 (Eastern (EST))
  - Summer (DST): UTC-4 (EDT)
- ZIP codes: 47463, 47403 (Bloomington)
- Area codes: 812, 930
- FIPS code: 18-72584
- GNIS feature ID: 2830467

Stanford is an unincorporated community and census-designated place (CDP) in Van Buren Township, Monroe County, in the U.S. state of Indiana.

== History ==
Stanford was platted in 1838. The first store was started in Stanford in 1839. A post office has been in operation at Stanford since 1839.

== Geography ==
Stanford is located in southwestern Monroe County. Indiana State Road 45 passes through the community, leading northeast 9 miles (14 km) to Bloomington, the county seat, and southwest 14 miles (23 km) to Owensburg.

According to the U.S. Census Bureau, the Stanford CDP has an area of 1.76 square miles (4.56 km^{2}), all land. It is bordered to the southeast by Indian Creek, which flows south to the East Fork of the White River near Dover Hill.

== Demographics ==
Historical population
Census	Pop.	Note	%±
2023 (est.)	463

The United States Census Bureau defined Stanford as a census designated place in the 2022 American Community Survey.
