= Hindustan, Indiana =

- Unincorporated community
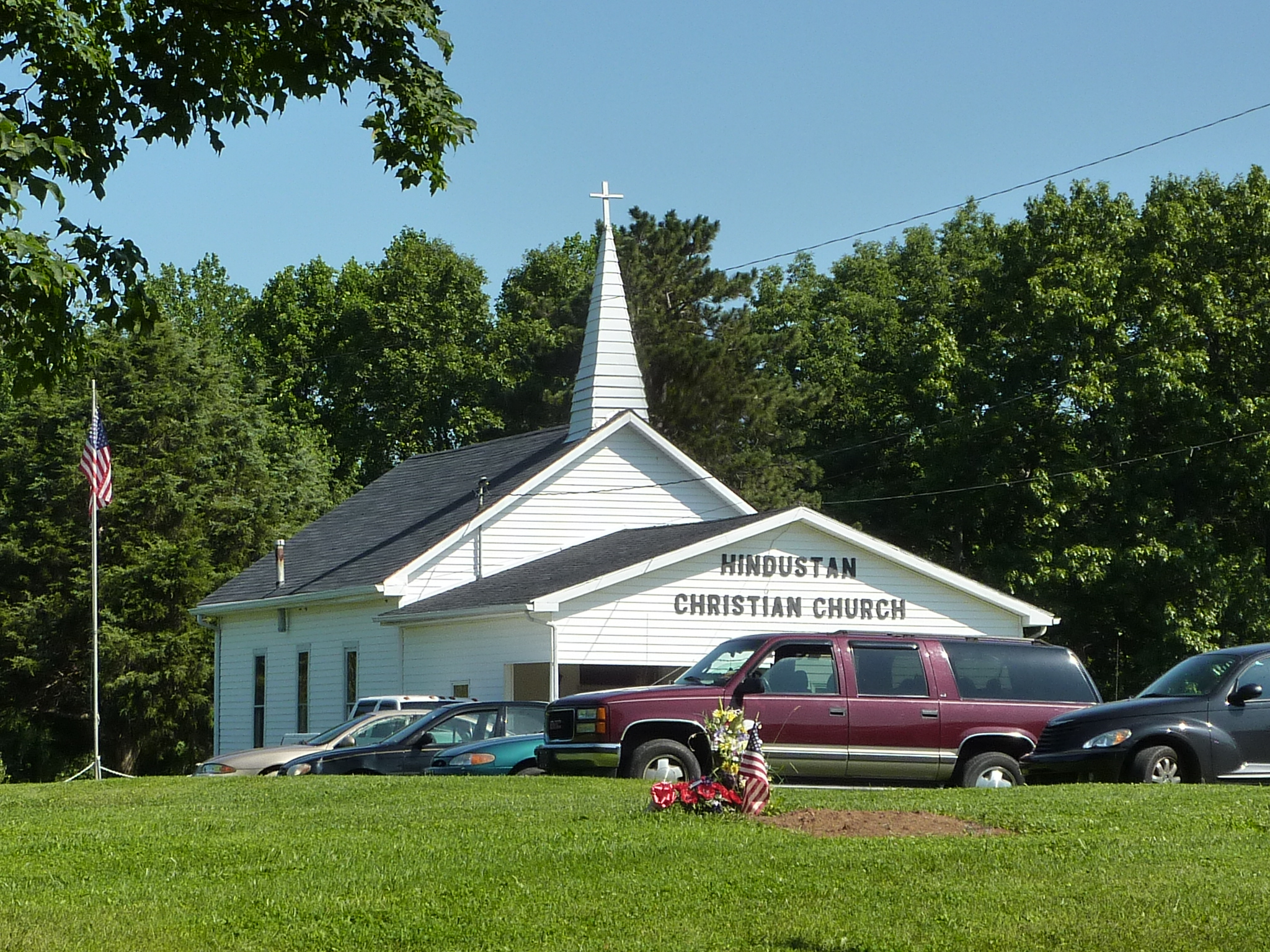
- Hindustan Christian Church

- Location within Indiana Location within the United States
- Coordinates: 39°18′29″N 86°29′00″W
- Country: United States
- State: Indiana
- County: Monroe
- Township: Washington
- Elevation: 853 ft (260 m)
- Time zone: UTC-5 (Eastern (EST))
  - Summer (DST): UTC-4 (EDT)
- ZIP code: 47408
- Area codes: 812, 930
- FIPS code: 18-34042
- GNIS feature ID: 436233

Hindustan is an unincorporated community in Washington Township, Monroe County, in the U.S. state of Indiana.

== History ==
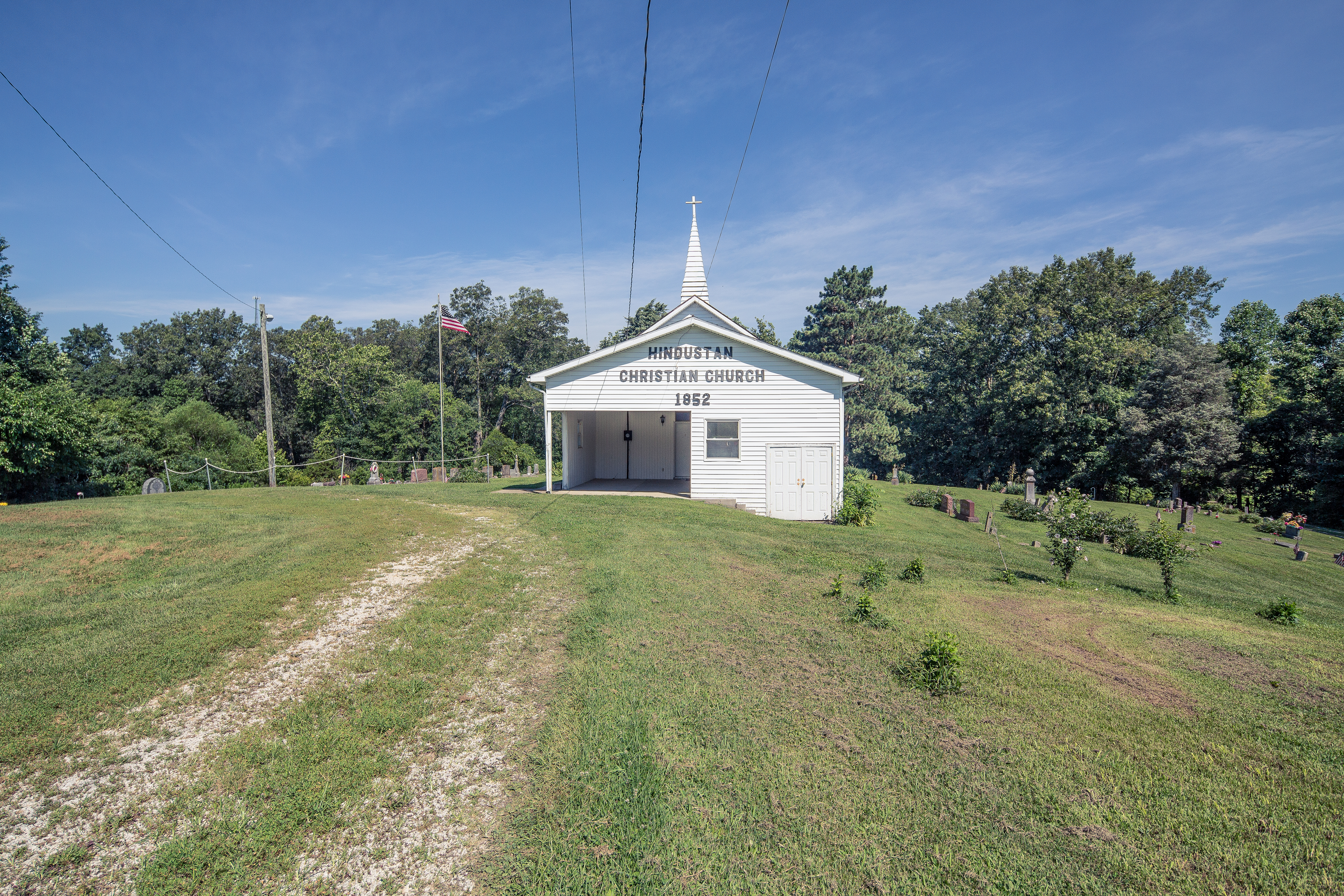
Photo from Small Town Indiana photo survey.

Hindustan was platted on August 18, 1853, by Charles G. Carr. The community took its name after India (Hindustan) "...or a region of it." Documents dating from the 1870s spell the town's name as 'Hindostan'.

== Geography ==
Hindustan is located at an altitude of 271 metres (892 feet) along Old State Road 37 between Chambers Pike and Farr Road. It is within the Morgan Monroe State Forest.
