= Salt Creek Township, Monroe County, Indiana =

Salt Creek Township
- Township
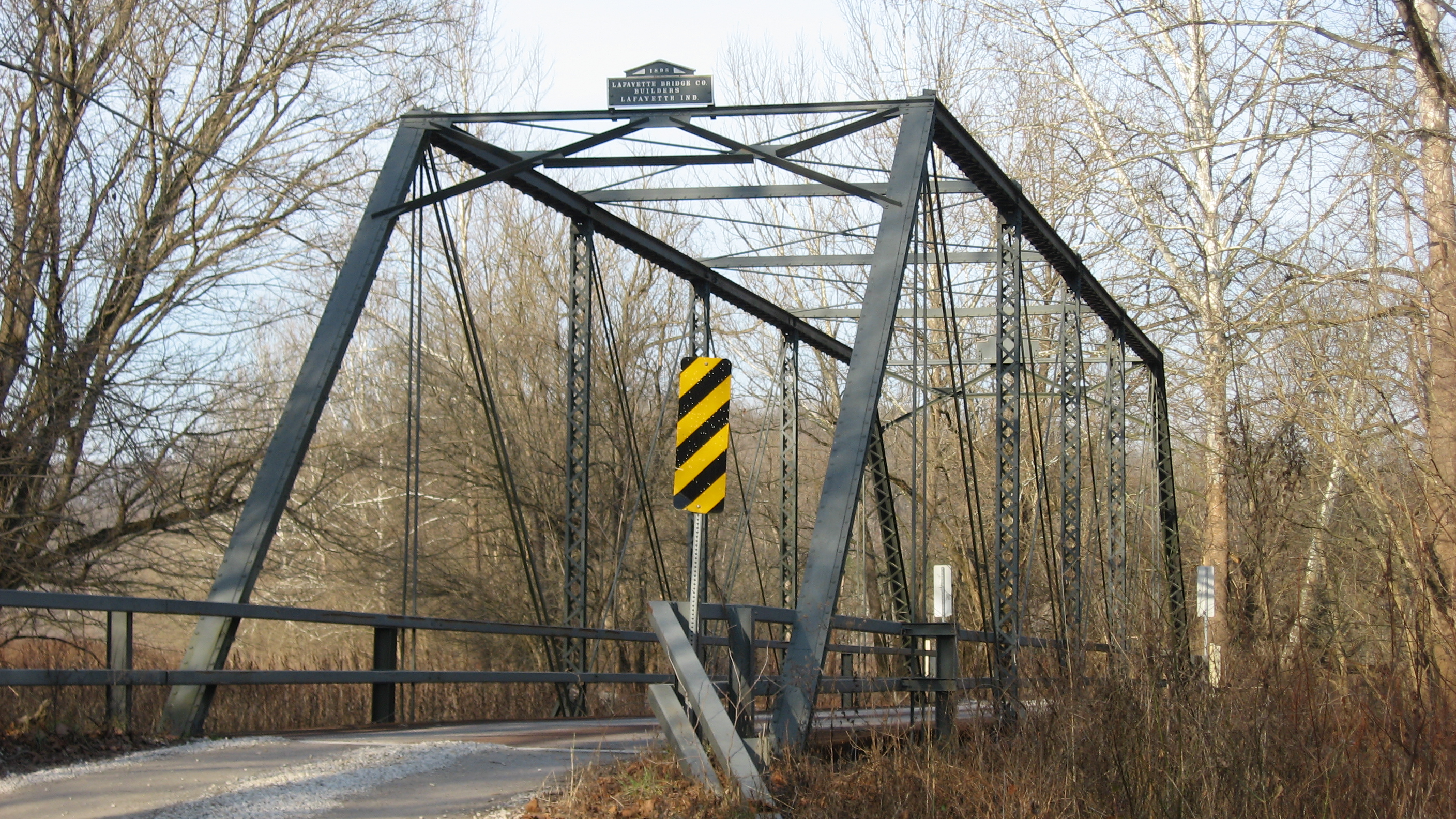
- A historic bridge over Stephens Creek in Salt Creek Township

- Location in Monroe County
- Coordinates: 39°07′25″N 86°24′37″W
- Country: United States
- State: Indiana
- County: Monroe

Government
  - Type: Indiana township

Area
  - Total: 29.78 sq mi (77.1 km^{2})
  - Land: 26.68 sq mi (69.1 km^{2})
  - Water: 3.1 sq mi (8.0 km^{2}) 10.41%
- Elevation: 633 ft (193 m)

Population (2020)
  - Total: 1,423
  - Density: 56.7/sq mi (21.9/km^{2})
- Time zone: UTC-5 (Eastern (EST))
  - Summer (DST): UTC-4 (EDT)
- ZIP codes: 47401, 47408
- Area codes: 812, 930
- GNIS feature ID: 453829

Salt Creek Township is one of eleven townships in Monroe County, Indiana, United States. As of the 2010 census, its population was 1,513 and it contained 822 housing units.

== History ==
Salt Creek Township was established in 1825. It was named from a salt spring which was the center of an early salt manufacturing industry.

== Geography ==
According to the 2010 census, the township has a total area of 29.78 square miles (77.1 km^{2}), of which 26.68 square miles (69.1 km^{2}) (or 89.59%) is land and 3.1 square miles (8.0 km^{2}) (or 10.41%) is water.

=== Unincorporated towns ===
- Knight Ridge at 39.125326°N 86.433049°W
- Woodville Hills at 39.150326°N 86.383326°W

(This list is based on USGS data and may include former settlements.)

=== Former communities ===
- Paynetown at 39.0749°N 86.4296°W - flooded by Lake Monroe

=== Cemeteries ===
The township contains Friendship Cemetery.

=== Major highways ===
- Indiana State Road 46

== School districts ==
- Monroe County Community School Corporation

== Political districts ==
- Indiana's 9th congressional district
- State House District 60
- State Senate District 44
