= Monroe County, Indiana =

County in Indiana, United States

- County
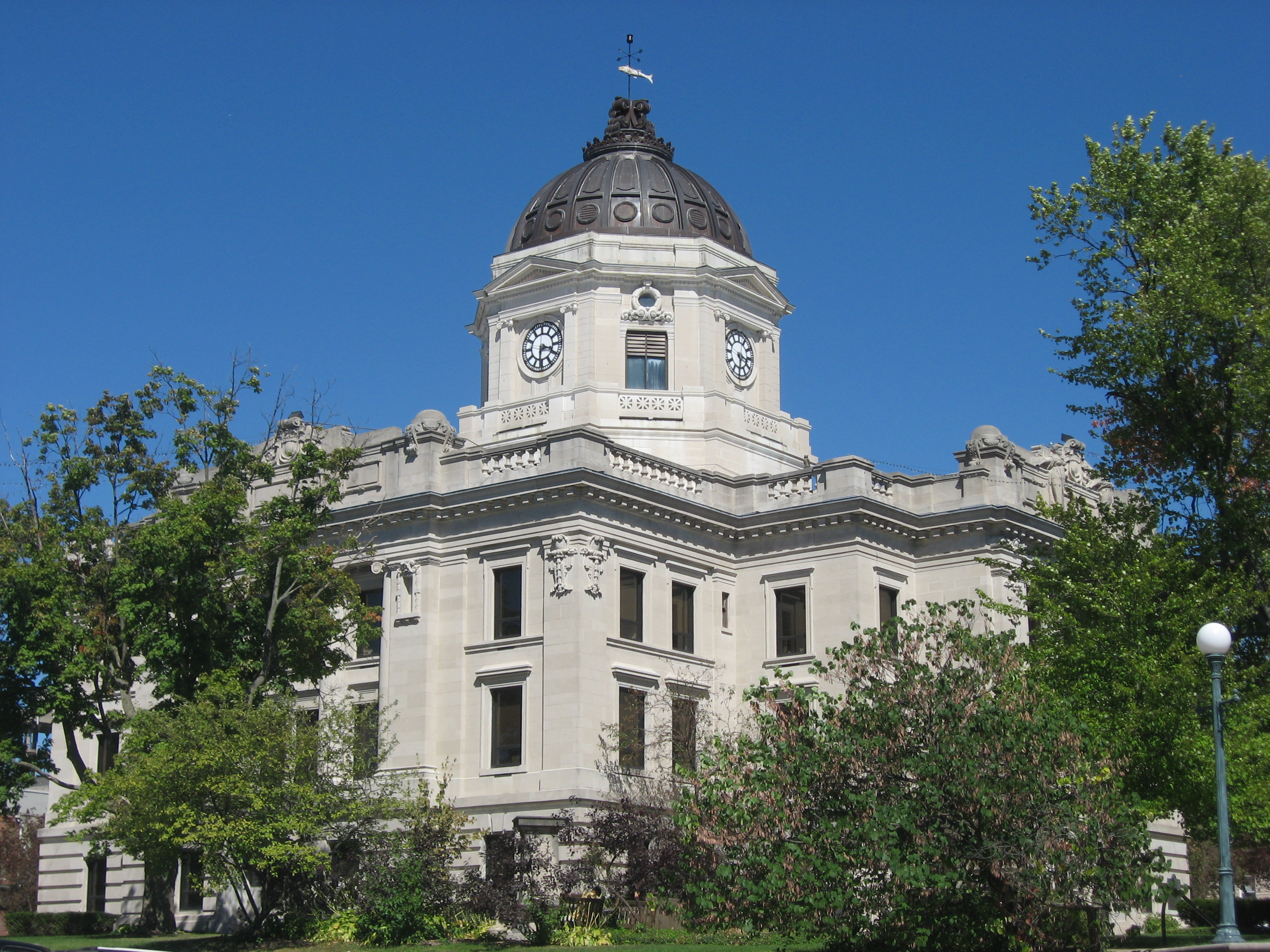
- Monroe County Courthouse in Bloomington, Indiana

- Seal

- Location within the U.S. state of Indiana
- Coordinates: 39°10′N 86°31′W
- Country: United States
- State: Indiana
- Founded: January 14, 1818
- Named for: James Monroe
- Seat: Bloomington
- Largest city: Bloomington

Area
  - Total: 411.32 sq mi (1,065.3 km^{2})
  - Land: 394.51 sq mi (1,021.8 km^{2})
  - Water: 16.81 sq mi (43.5 km^{2}) 4.09%

Population (2020)
  - Total: 139,718
  - Estimate (2025): 143,345 ▲
  - Density: 354.16/sq mi (136.74/km^{2})
- Time zone: UTC−5 (Eastern)
  - Summer (DST): UTC−4 (EDT)
- Congressional district: 9th
- Website: www.in.gov/counties/monroe/
- Indiana county number 53

Monroe County is a county in the U.S. state of Indiana. In 1910 the US Census Bureau calculated the nation's mean population center to lie in Monroe County. The population was 139,718 at the 2020 United States census. The county seat is Bloomington. Monroe County is part of the Bloomington, Indiana Metropolitan Statistical Area.

== History ==
Monroe County was formed in 1818 from portions of Orange County. It was named for James Monroe, fifth President of the United States, who was in that office from 1817 until 1825.

== Demographics ==
Historical population
Census	Pop.	Note	%±
1820	2,679		—
1830	6,577		145.5%
1840	10,143		54.2%
1850	11,286		11.3%
1860	12,847		13.8%
1870	14,168		10.3%
1880	15,875		12.0%
1890	17,673		11.3%
1900	20,873		18.1%
1910	23,426		12.2%
1920	24,519		4.7%
1930	35,974		46.7%
1940	36,534		1.6%
1950	50,080		37.1%
1960	59,225		18.3%
1970	84,849		43.3%
1980	98,785		16.4%
1990	108,978		10.3%
2000	120,563		10.6%
2010	137,974		14.4%
2020	139,718		1.3%
2025 (est.)	143,345	▲	2.6%
US Decennial Census; 1790–1960 1900–1990; 1990–2000 2010

=== Racial and ethnic composition ===
Monroe County, Indiana – Racial and ethnic composition Note: the US Census treats Hispanic/Latino as an ethnic category. This table excludes Latinos from the racial categories and assigns them to a separate category. Hispanics/Latinos may be of any race.
Race / Ethnicity (NH = Non-Hispanic)	Pop 1980	Pop 1990	Pop 2000	Pop 2010	Pop 2020	% 1980	% 1990	% 2000	% 2010	% 2020
White alone (NH)	92,716	101,814	108,314	118,837	112,490	93.86%	93.43%	89.84%	86.13%	80.51%
Black or African American alone (NH)	2,538	2,789	3,567	4,363	5,016	2.57%	2.56%	2.96%	3.16%	3.59%
Native American or Alaska Native alone (NH)	130	202	296	288	222	0.13%	0.19%	0.25%	0.21%	0.16%
Asian alone (NH)	1,139	2,672	4,048	7,190	8,350	1.15%	2.45%	3.36%	5.21%	5.98%
Native Hawaiian or Pacific Islander alone (NH)	x	x	46	56	37	x	x	0.04%	0.04%	0.03%
Other race alone (NH)	1,158	134	282	232	538	1.17%	0.12%	0.23%	0.17%	0.39%
Mixed race or Multiracial (NH)	x	x	1,775	2,979	6,707	x	x	1.47%	2.16%	4.80%
Hispanic or Latino (any race)	1,104	1,367	2,235	4,029	6,358	1.12%	1.25%	1.85%	2.92%	4.55%
Total	98,785	108,978	120,563	137,974	139,718	100.00%	100.00%	100.00%	100.00%	100.00%

=== 2020 census ===
As of the 2020 census, the county had a population of 139,718. The median age was 31.0 years. 16.6% of residents were under the age of 18 and 14.6% of residents were 65 years of age or older. For every 100 females there were 99.8 males, and for every 100 females age 18 and over there were 98.1 males age 18 and over.

The racial makeup of the county was 81.9% White, 3.7% Black or African American, 0.2% American Indian and Alaska Native, 6.0% Asian, <0.1% Native Hawaiian and Pacific Islander, 1.5% from some other race, and 6.6% from two or more races. Hispanic or Latino residents of any race comprised 4.6% of the population.

78.8% of residents lived in urban areas, while 21.2% lived in rural areas.

There were 58,268 households in the county, of which 21.9% had children under the age of 18 living in them. Of all households, 36.9% were married-couple households, 26.1% were households with a male householder and no spouse or partner present, and 29.6% were households with a female householder and no spouse or partner present. About 35.3% of all households were made up of individuals and 10.1% had someone living alone who was 65 years of age or older.

There were 63,606 housing units, of which 8.4% were vacant. Among occupied housing units, 51.9% were owner-occupied and 48.1% were renter-occupied. The homeowner vacancy rate was 1.3% and the rental vacancy rate was 6.0%.

=== 2021 American Community Survey ===
According to the American Community Survey, as of 2021, there were 56,714 households with the average household size of 2.18 persons. Out of those 27,340 households were families with the average family size of 2.87 persons, 22.1% had children under the age of 18 living with them. A total of 37.3% of all households were householders living alone.

The median income for a household in the county was $51,945 (in 2021 USD) and the per capita income was $30,609. Males had a median income of $52,263 versus $47,953 for females.

About 10.6% of families and 22.8% of the population were below the poverty line, including 14.7% of those under age 18 and 6.2% of those age 65 or over.

== Geography ==
According to the 2010 census, the county has a total area of 411.32 square miles (1,065.3 km^{2}), of which 394.51 square miles (1,021.8 km^{2}) (or 95.91%) is land and 16.81 square miles (43.5 km^{2}) (or 4.09%) is water. The county terrain is low rolling hills, covered with vegetation and largely devoted to agricultural use or urban development. The eastern part is carved with drainages and gullies, leading to Griffy Lake. The county's highest point is McGuire Benchmark, just NW of Bloomington, at 994 ft (303 m) ASL.

=== Adjacent counties ===
- Morgan (north)
- Brown (northeast)
- Jackson (southeast)
- Lawrence (south)
- Greene (southwest)
- Owen (northwest)

=== Bodies of water ===
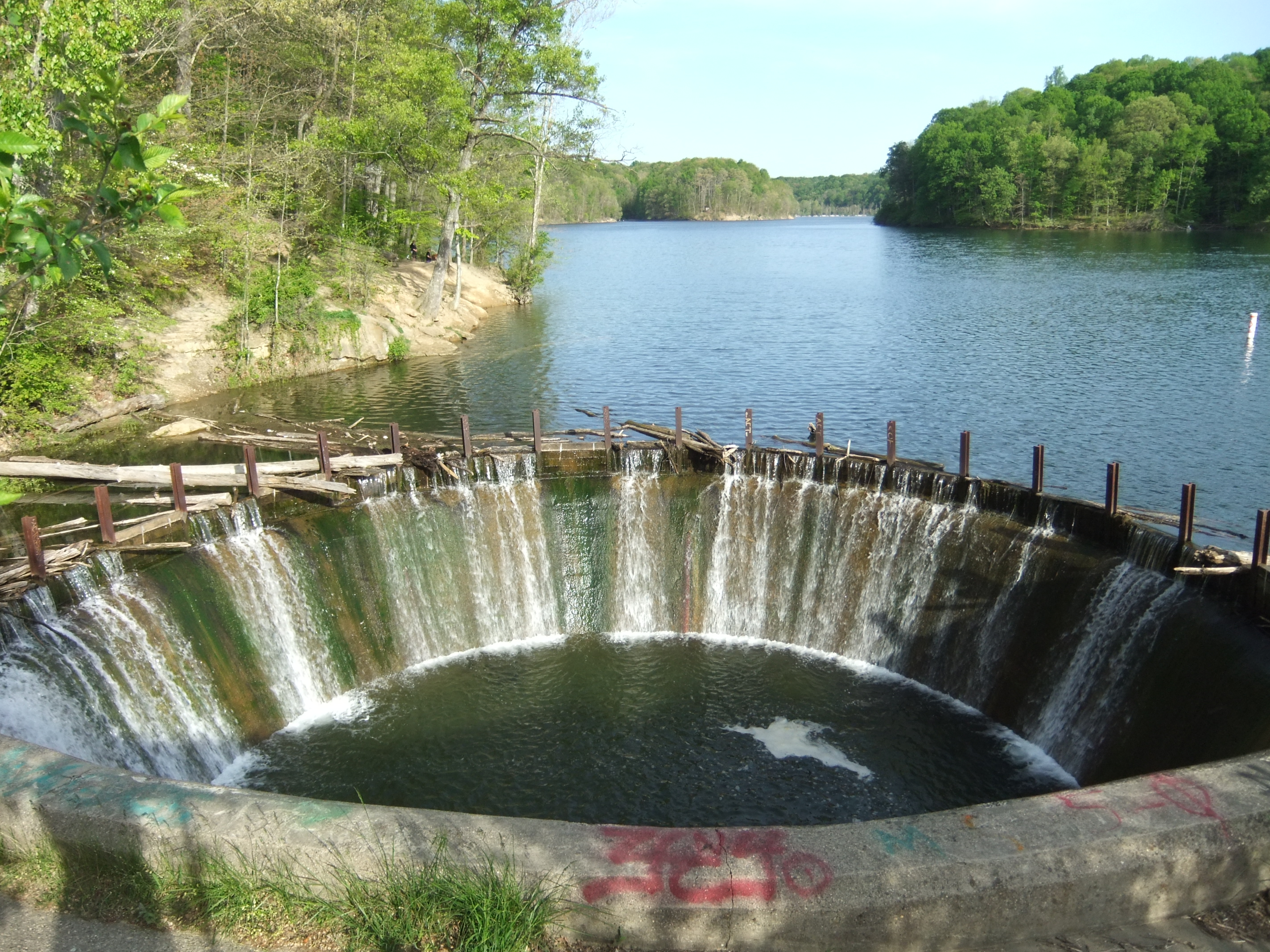
Griffy Lake, seen from its dam

Monroe County is divided between the basins of the East Fork and West Fork of Indiana's White River. The northern part drains to the West Fork; the southern part of the county drains to the East Fork, primarily via the Salt Creek and its tributaries, such as the Clear Creek (known as the "Campus River" on Indiana University Bloomington campus).

Several artificial reservoirs have been constructed by damming the county's creeks. The largest is Monroe Lake, a large reservoir on Salt Creek in the southeastern part of the county. It is used both for recreational purposes and to supply the city with drinking water. Until the late 1960s, the main source of water supply was the smaller Lake Lemon (constructed 1953), in the northeastern part of the county; it is now the backup water source and is mainly used for recreation.

The third largest is Griffy Lake, on the northern slope of the county. Constructed in 1924 by damming Griffy Creek, it was Bloomington's main water source until 1954; it is now used primarily for recreation although it also serves as an emergency water source. In 2012–2013, the lake was drained, the dam repaired, and the lake was refilled.

A smaller lake, Weimer (Wapehani) in the Clear Creek basin, was constructed for water supply purposes, but during most of its history was used purely for recreation - mainly fishing. In 2017 authorities revealed plans to drain this lake permanently, as it was considered to be unsafe. This was carried out in the summer of 2018.

Limestone has been quarried in Monroe County since 1826. A number of abandoned limestone quarries in the county are now cliff-surrounded lakes (as seen in the 1979 film Breaking Away), stable without ongoing human intervention.

=== National protected areas ===
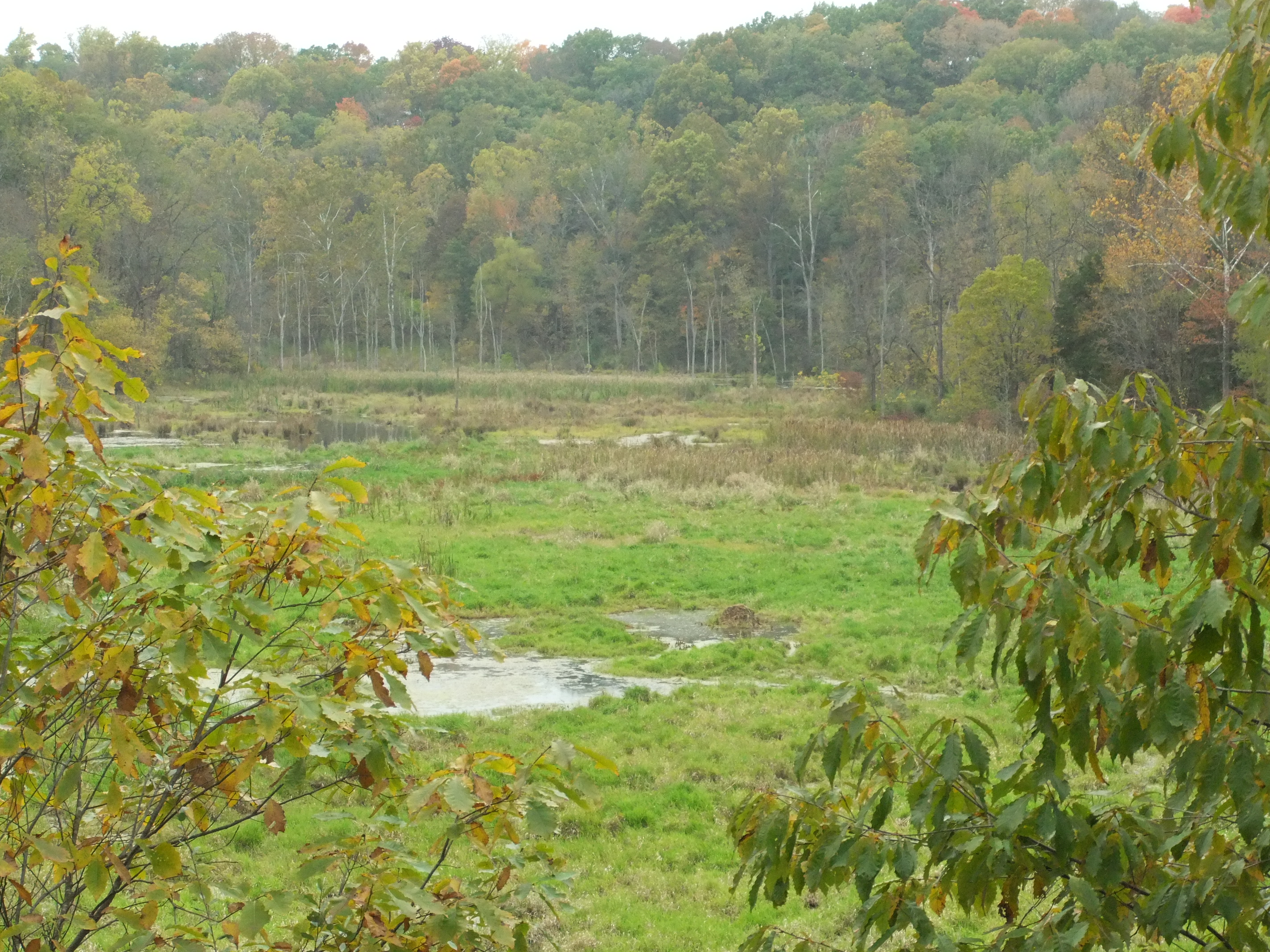
The defunct Leonard Springs Reservoir, now inhabited by beavers.

- Hoosier National Forest (part)

=== Natural wonders ===
- Buckner Cave
- Leonard Springs Nature Park, where the water of Sinking Creek reappears in springs

== Communities ==
=== Cities ===
- Bloomington

=== Towns ===
- Ellettsville
- Stinesville

=== Census-designated places ===
- Harrodsburg
- Smithville-Sanders

=== Unincorporated communities ===
- Arlington
- Broadview
- Buenavista
- Cascade
- Chapel Hill
- Clear Creek
- Dolan
- Eastern Heights
- Elwren
- Fairfax
- Fleener
- Forest Park Heights
- Garden Acres
- Handy
- Highland Village
- Hindustan
- Hoosier Acres
- Kirby
- Kirksville
- Knight Ridge
- Lancaster Park
- Leonard Springs
- Mount Tabor
- New Unionville
- Ridgemede
- Sanders
- Smithville
- Stanford
- Sunny Slopes
- Unionville
- Van Buren Park
- Victor
- Wayport
- Woodbridge
- Woodville Hills
- Yellowstone

=== Former communities ===
- Paynetown at 39.0749°N 86.4296°W - flooded by Lake Monroe

=== Townships ===
- Bean Blossom
- Benton
- Bloomington
- Clear Creek
- Indian Creek
- Perry
- Polk
- Richland
- Salt Creek
- Van Buren
- Washington

== Climate and weather ==
Bloomington, Indiana

Climate chart (precipitation, max. and min. temperature)
J	F	M	A	M	J	J	A	S	O	N	D
2.7 36 19	2.7 42 23	3.7 52 32	4.3 64 41	5.1 74 52	4.1 82 61	4.3 86 65	4 84 62	3.6 78 55	3.1 67 44	4 54 35	3.4 41 24
- █ Average max. and min. temperatures in °F
- █ Precipitation totals in inches
- Source: The Weather Channel
Metric conversion
J	F	M	A	M	J	J	A	S	O	N	D
68 2 −7	69 6 −5	93 11 0	109 18 5	130 23 11	103 28 16	110 30 18	101 29 17	92 26 13	80 19 7	100 12 2	86 5 −4
- █ Average max. and min. temperatures in °C
- █ Precipitation totals in mm

In recent years, average temperatures in Bloomington have ranged from a low of 19 °F (−7 °C) in January to a high of 86 °F (30 °C) in July, although a record low of −21 °F (−29 °C) was recorded in January 1985 and a record high of 110 °F (43 °C) was recorded in July 1936. Average monthly precipitation ranged from 2.66 inches (68 mm) in January to 5.12 inches (130 mm) in May.

== Government and politics ==
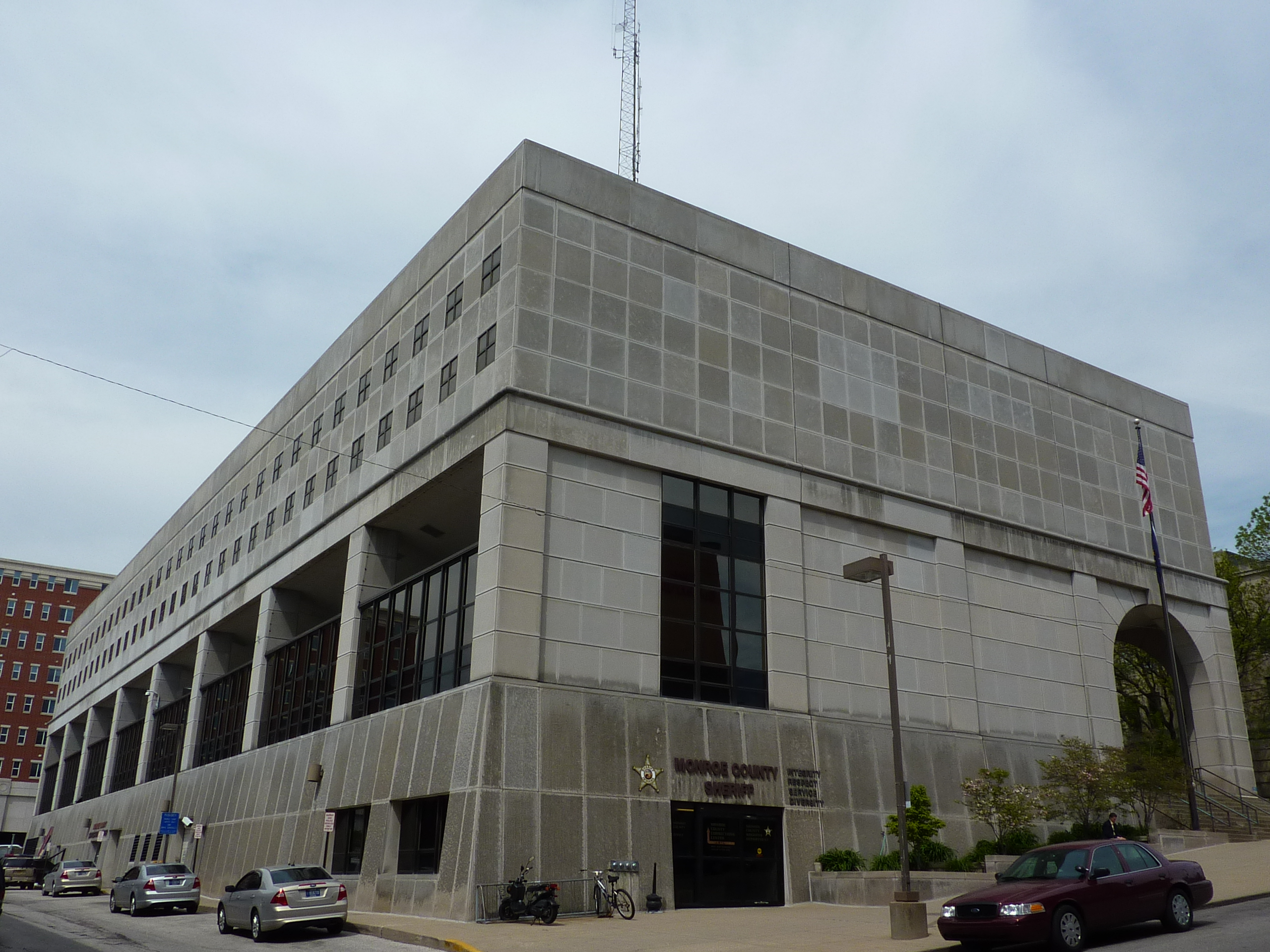
Sheriff's office and jail

The county government is a constitutional body, and is granted specific powers by the Constitution of Indiana, and by the Indiana Code.

County Council: The fiscal body of the county government; controls spending and revenue collection in the county. There are four elected members representing districts and three members elected at-large. The council members serve staggered four-year terms. They are responsible for setting salaries, the annual budget, and special spending. The council also has authority to impose local taxes, in the form of an income and property tax that is subject to state level approval, excise taxes, and service taxes.

Board of Commissioners: A three-member board serving as the executive and legislative body of the county. The commissioners are elected county-wide, in staggered four-year terms. The president of this board is the county's principal executive officer. The commissioners are charged with setting policy and managing the day-to-day functions of the county government.

Court: The county maintains a unified circuit court with nine divisions and a court commissioner who handles civil cases. Judges must be members of the Indiana Bar Association; they are elected to six-year terms. Some court decisions can be appealed to the state level (appeals court, state supreme court).

County Officials: The county has several other elected offices, including sheriff, coroner, auditor, treasurer, recorder, surveyor, assessor, and circuit court clerk. They are elected county-wide to four-year terms. Members elected to county government positions are required to declare party affiliations and to be residents of the county.

Monroe County is part of Indiana's 9th congressional district and is represented in Congress Republican Erin Houchin. It is part of Indiana Senate districts 37, 40 and 44; and Indiana House of Representatives districts 46, 60 and 61.

=== Courthouse ===
The Monroe County Courthouse is the seat of government for Monroe County and is the traditional center of Bloomington. The third courthouse to stand on the Downtown Square, the current courthouse was built in 1907 during a time of great prosperity. Wing & Mahurin designed the building.

=== Politics ===
Monroe County traditionally leaned Republican. However, like many counties with large universities, it has trended strongly towards Democrats in recent years, voting for the Democratic nominee in 7 out of the last 8 presidential elections. In 2008, Barack Obama won the county by the largest margin for a Democrat running for president since 1912. President Obama also became the first Democrat since Franklin Pierce in 1852 to win the county with over 60% of the vote. Since 2008, the county has gone Democratic by large margins, and is now considered one of the few reliably Democratic counties in traditionally Republican Indiana. In recent years, only Marion County (Indianapolis) has been more Democratic. The county has not supported a Republican for president since 2000, when it narrowly supported George W. Bush over Al Gore by a 4.04% plurality.

United States presidential election results for Monroe County, Indiana
Year	Republican		Democratic		Third party(ies)	
Year	No.	%	No.	%	No.	%
1888	2,054	51.50%	1,815	45.51%	119	2.98%
1892	2,017	45.88%	1,937	44.06%	442	10.05%
1896	2,510	50.20%	2,422	48.44%	68	1.36%
1900	2,788	52.68%	2,397	45.29%	107	2.02%
1904	3,042	55.81%	2,286	41.94%	123	2.26%
1908	3,051	51.48%	2,780	46.91%	95	1.60%
1912	1,388	25.19%	2,396	43.48%	1,727	31.34%
1916	3,033	50.31%	2,796	46.38%	200	3.32%
1920	5,633	53.65%	4,751	45.25%	116	1.10%
1924	6,247	55.22%	4,689	41.45%	376	3.32%
1928	8,883	67.00%	4,317	32.56%	59	0.44%
1932	7,759	47.03%	8,478	51.39%	260	1.58%
1936	8,842	48.82%	9,220	50.91%	48	0.27%
1940	10,311	55.74%	8,117	43.88%	71	0.38%
1944	8,993	55.77%	6,809	42.23%	323	2.00%
1948	9,579	54.64%	7,375	42.07%	578	3.30%
1952	12,072	60.59%	7,745	38.87%	108	0.54%
1956	13,223	62.92%	7,732	36.79%	60	0.29%
1960	14,513	65.42%	7,535	33.97%	136	0.61%
1964	10,309	46.08%	11,918	53.27%	145	0.65%
1968	13,752	50.78%	10,789	39.84%	2,539	9.38%
1972	19,953	56.05%	15,241	42.82%	402	1.13%
1976	18,938	53.06%	16,609	46.53%	148	0.41%
1980	18,233	49.42%	13,316	36.09%	5,345	14.49%
1984	21,772	59.12%	14,719	39.97%	335	0.91%
1988	20,756	56.04%	15,855	42.81%	427	1.15%
1992	16,661	38.22%	19,712	45.22%	7,214	16.55%
1996	16,744	42.27%	18,531	46.78%	4,334	10.94%
2000	19,147	47.61%	17,523	43.57%	3,550	8.83%
2004	22,834	45.25%	26,965	53.43%	668	1.32%
2008	21,118	33.32%	41,450	65.39%	819	1.29%
2012	22,481	39.29%	33,436	58.43%	1,306	2.28%
2016	20,592	35.23%	34,216	58.53%	3,646	6.24%
2020	22,071	34.95%	39,861	63.12%	1,219	1.93%
2024	21,004	35.24%	37,213	62.44%	1,385	2.32%

== Education ==
Monroe County Public Library operates branches at Bloomington and Ellettsville.

Monroe County is home to Indiana University Bloomington.

== Transportation ==
=== Major highways ===
- I-69
- Indiana State Road 37
- Indiana State Road 45
- Indiana State Road 46
- Indiana State Road 48
- Indiana State Road 446

For many years Monroe County was one of the most populous counties in the USA which did not contain any US highways or Interstate highways. However, in December 2015 the I-69 extension was completed into the county and this distinction disappeared. The highway was further extended north into Morgan County in 2018.

=== Railways ===
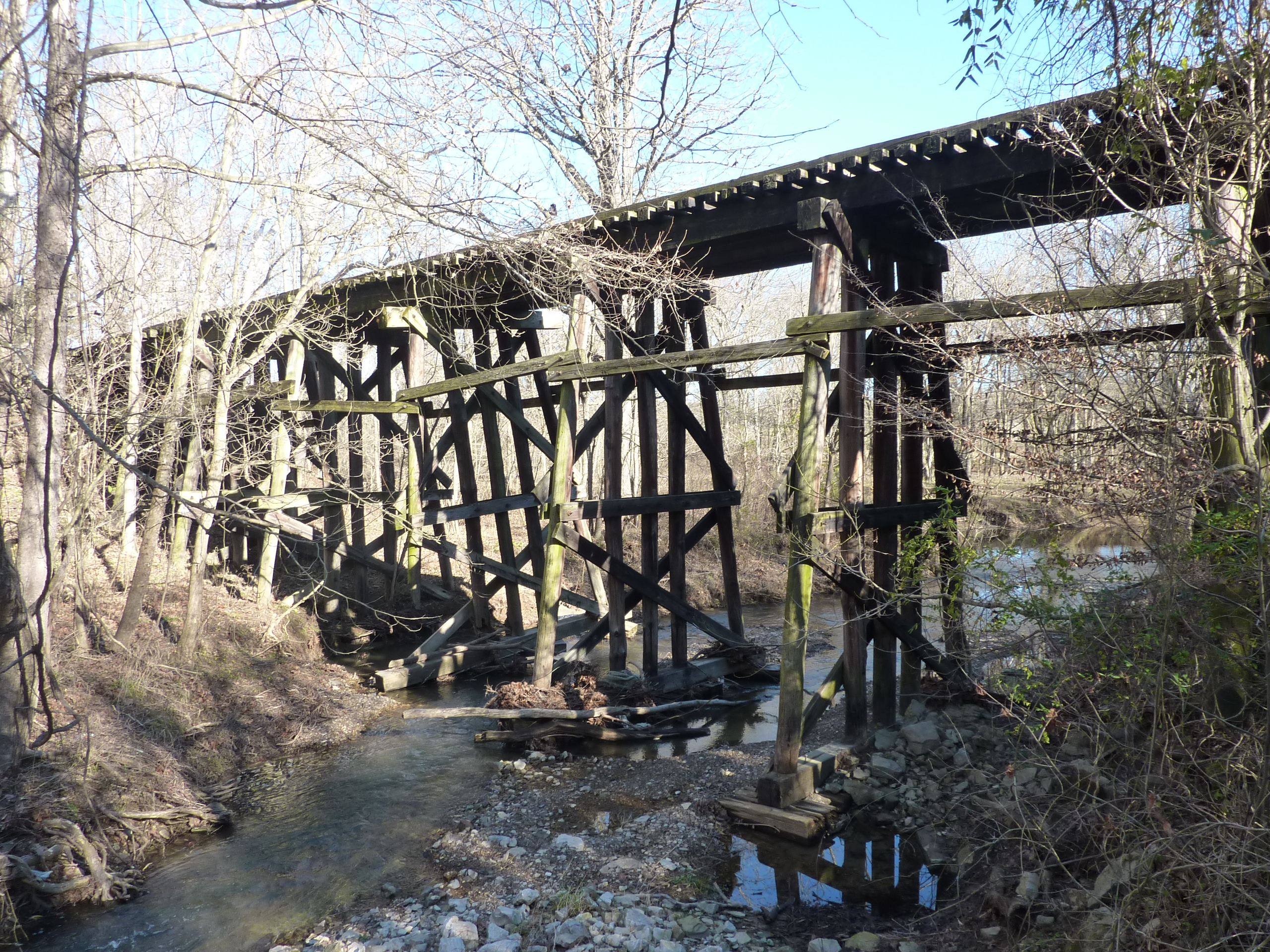
A trestle on an abandoned railway line (the former Monon Railway mainline) in Perry Township

Although Monroe County has a rich railway history, currently its only railway is the Indiana Rail Road, whose mainline crosses the county from the north-east to the south-west, with branches to a few industrial facilities. There is no passenger service.

Between 1854 and 2004, an important north–south line connecting the Ohio River with Lake Michigan crossed Monroe County as well, serving Stinesville, Elletsville, Bloomington, Smithville, and Harrodsburg. It was operated by the Monon Railroad throughout much of the 20th century, and later by CSX. The last passenger service operating on this line was Amtrak's Floridian Chicago-Miami service, during 1972–1979. With the termination of this service in 1979, Monroe County lost passenger railway service. CSX continued to use this line for freight for another quarter of a century, but in 2004, it stopped using this line. Large parts of it have since been converted to trails.

=== Air transport ===
- Monroe County Airport, southwest of Bloomington. Scheduled passenger service to this airport was terminated ca. 1997, and since then the airport has been used by general aviation only.

== Education ==
Local public school districts include:

- Monroe County Community School Corporation
- Richland-Bean Blossom Community School Corporation

== See also ==
- National Register of Historic Places listings in Monroe County, Indiana
