= Sanders, Indiana =

- Unincorporated community
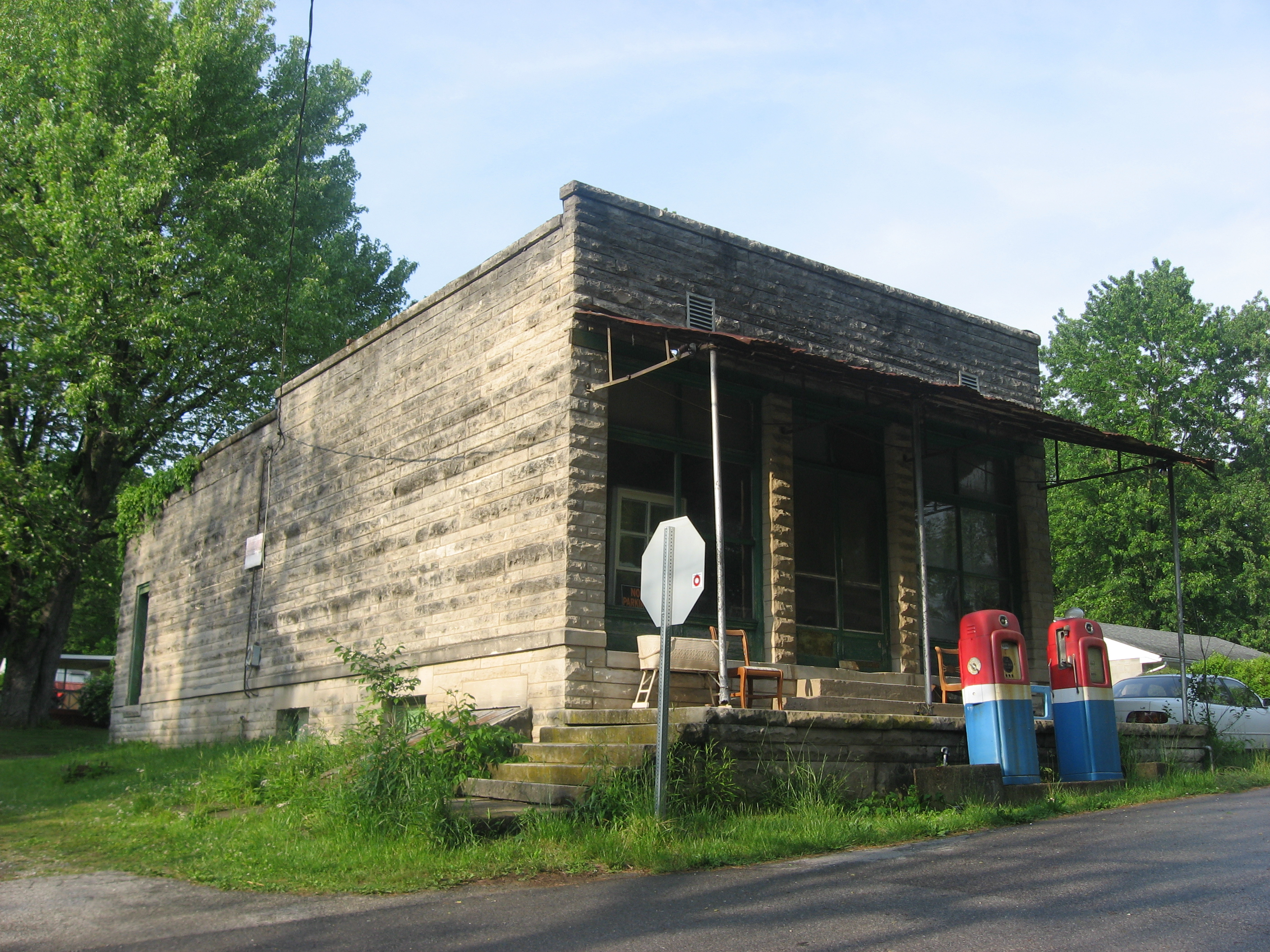
- Former Hays Market store

- Location within Indiana Location within the United States
- Coordinates: 39°04′47″N 86°30′48″W
- Country: United States
- State: Indiana
- County: Monroe
- Township: Perry
- Elevation: 745 ft (227 m)
- Time zone: UTC-5 (Eastern (EST))
  - Summer (DST): UTC-4 (EDT)
- ZIP code: 47401
- Area codes: 812, 930
- FIPS code: 18-67806
- GNIS feature ID: 442994

Sanders is an unincorporated community in Perry Township, Monroe County, in the U.S. state of Indiana.

== History ==
Sanders was originally known as Limestone, and under the latter name was platted in 1892. The community was named after the Sanders family of settlers.

A post office was established under the name Sanders in 1893, and remained in operation until it was discontinued in 1912.

Many descendants of the original inhabitants of the town remain, and Sanders continues to be a distinct community within Monroe County, Indiana.

Current economic activity in Sanders includes the Indiana Limestone Company, Bloomington String Instruments, Sanders Pentecostal Church, and a renovation of the former Hay's Market into guest housing for the nearby Whippoorwill Hill farm wedding and event venue is ongoing.
