= Perry Township, Monroe County, Indiana =

Perry Township
- Township
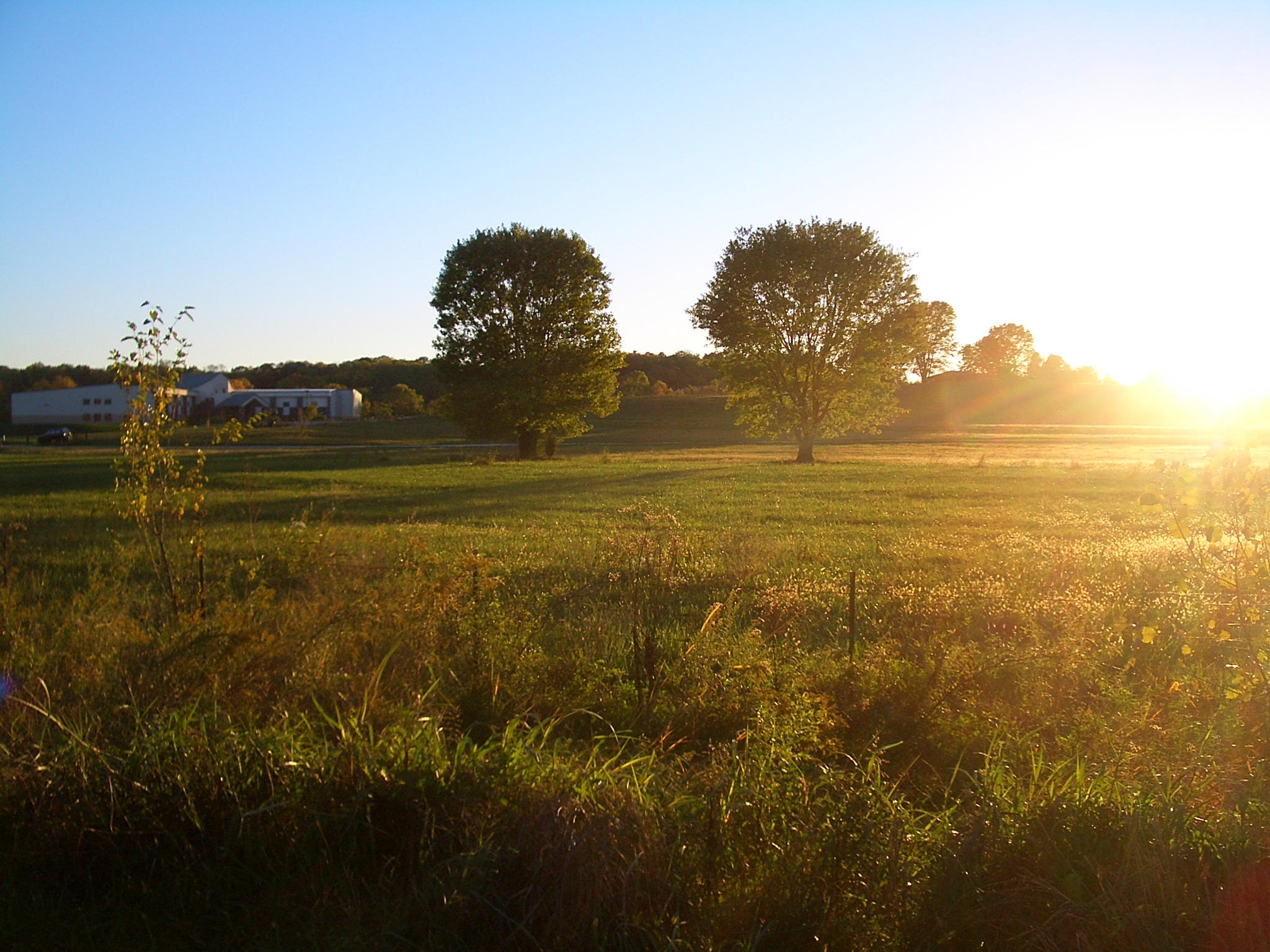
- Field in Perry Township

- Location in Monroe County
- Coordinates: 39°07′21″N 86°31′08″W
- Country: United States
- State: Indiana
- County: Monroe

Government
  - Type: Indiana township

Area
  - Total: 35.48 sq mi (91.9 km^{2})
  - Land: 35.36 sq mi (91.6 km^{2})
  - Water: 0.12 sq mi (0.31 km^{2}) 0.34%
- Elevation: 728 ft (222 m)

Population (2020)
  - Total: 52,807
  - Density: 1,433.2/sq mi (553.4/km^{2})
- Time zone: UTC-5 (Eastern (EST))
  - Summer (DST): UTC-4 (EDT)
- ZIP codes: 47401, 47403, 47404
- Area codes: 812, 930
- GNIS feature ID: 453723
- Website: www.in.gov/townships/perry53/

Perry Township is one of eleven townships in Monroe County, Indiana, United States. As of the 2010 census, its population was 50,673 and it contained 24,194 housing units.

== History ==
Perry Township was established in 1830. It was named for Commodore Oliver Hazard Perry.

== Geography ==
According to the 2010 census, the township has a total area of 35.48 square miles (91.9 km^{2}), of which 35.36 square miles (91.6 km^{2}) (or 99.66%) is land and 0.12 square miles (0.31 km^{2}) (or 0.34%) is water.

=== Cities, towns, villages ===
- Bloomington (southern half of the city, south of [approximately] Third Street)

=== Unincorporated towns ===
- Broadview at 39.13977°N 86.538330°W
- Clear Creek at 39.109214°N 86.539997°W
- Handy at 39.095881°N 86.493884°W
- Hoosier Acres at 39.157825°N 86.48694°W
- Ridgemede at 39.151992°N 86.503052°W
- Sanders at 39.079770°N 86.513329°W
- Smithville-Sanders (part)
- Sunny Slopes at 39.131992°N 86.531108°W

(This list is based on USGS data and may include former settlements.)

=== Cemeteries ===
The township contains Mount Salem Cemetery.

=== Major highways ===
- Indiana State Road 37
- Indiana State Road 45
- Indiana State Road 46

== School districts ==
- Monroe County Community School Corporation

== Political districts ==
- Indiana's 9th congressional district
- State House District 60
- State House District 61
- State Senate District 40

== Gallery ==
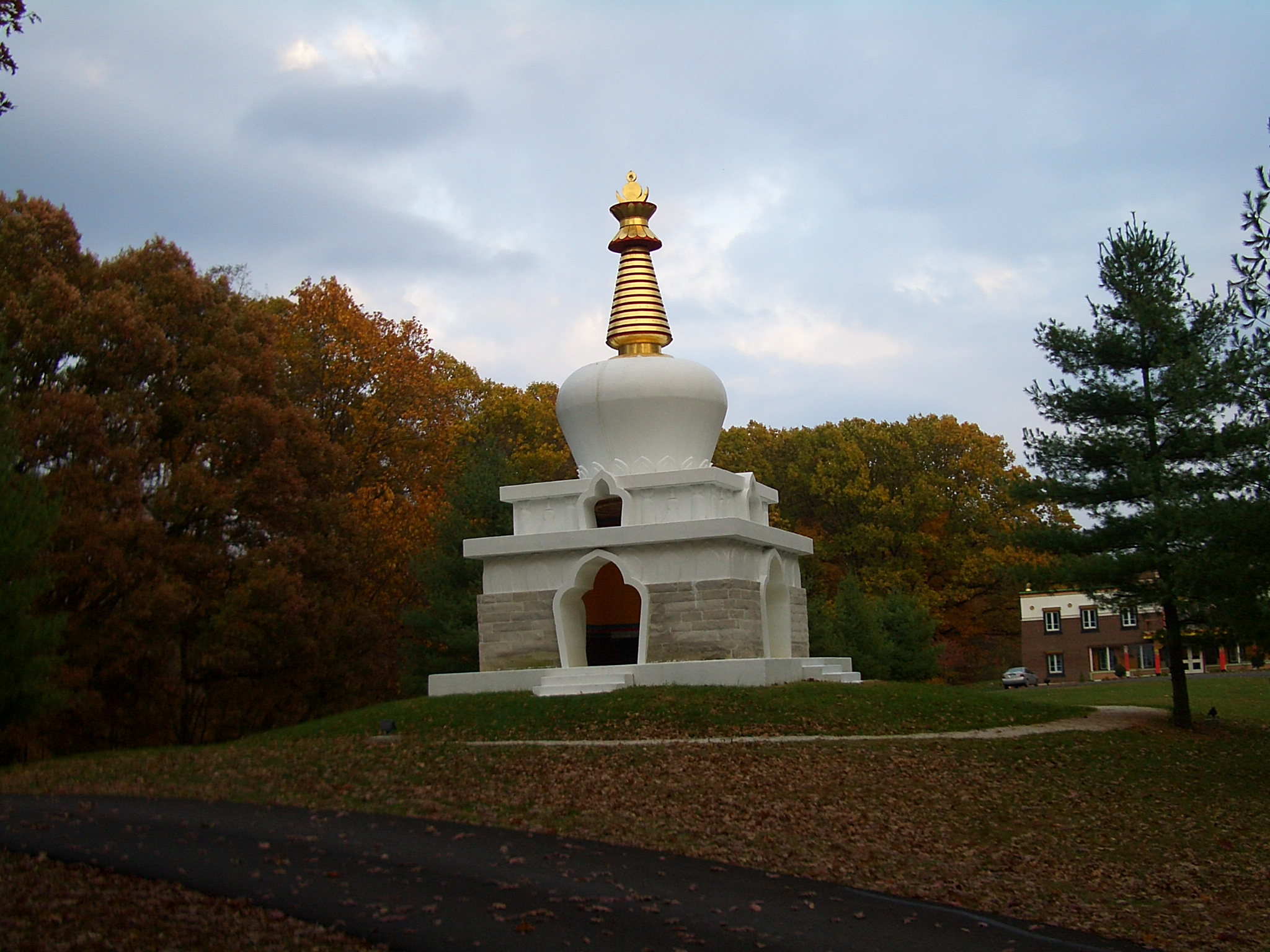
Kalacakra Stupa, Tibetan Mongolian Buddhist Cultural Center

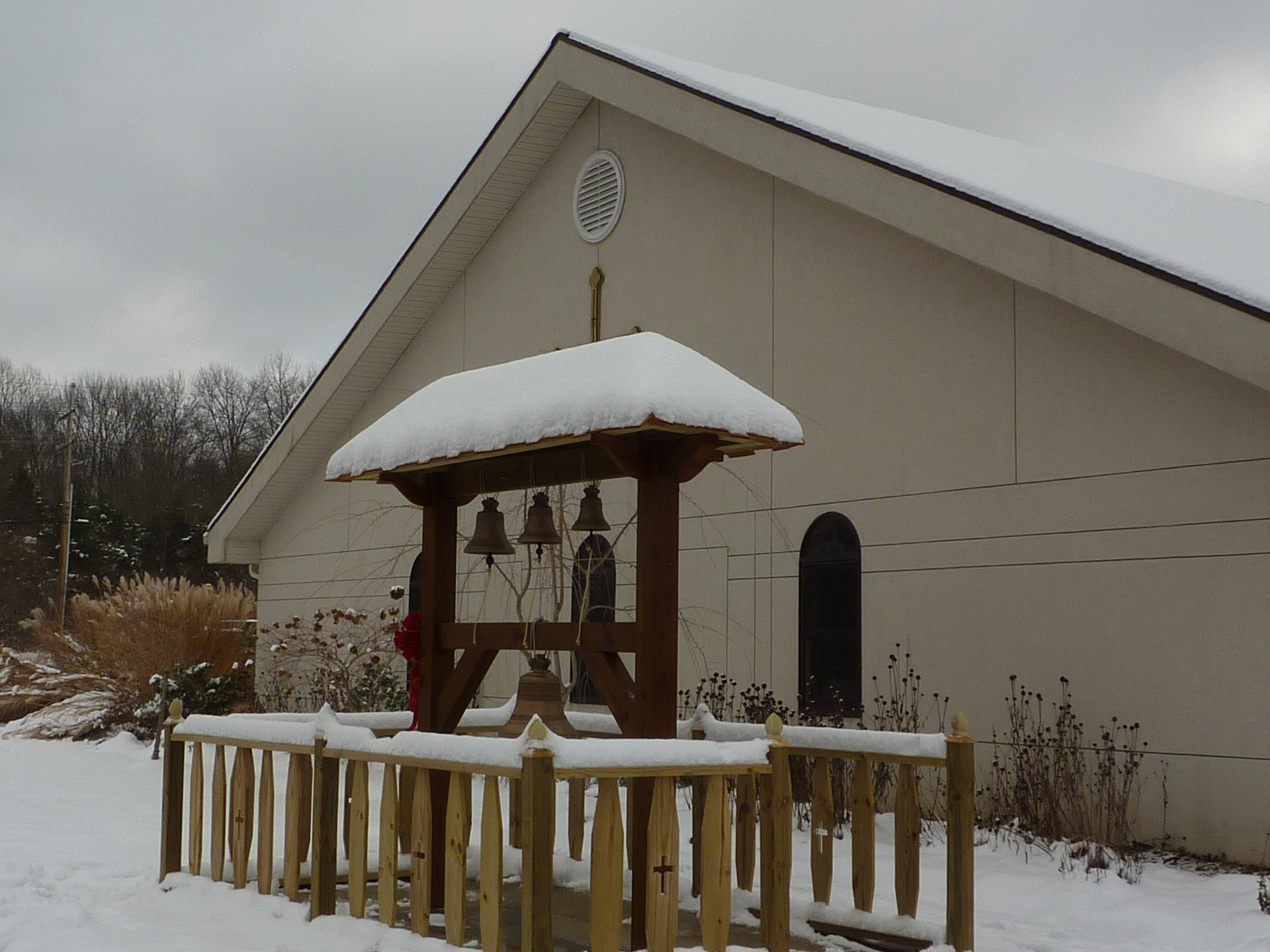
All Saints' Orthodox Church on a winter day

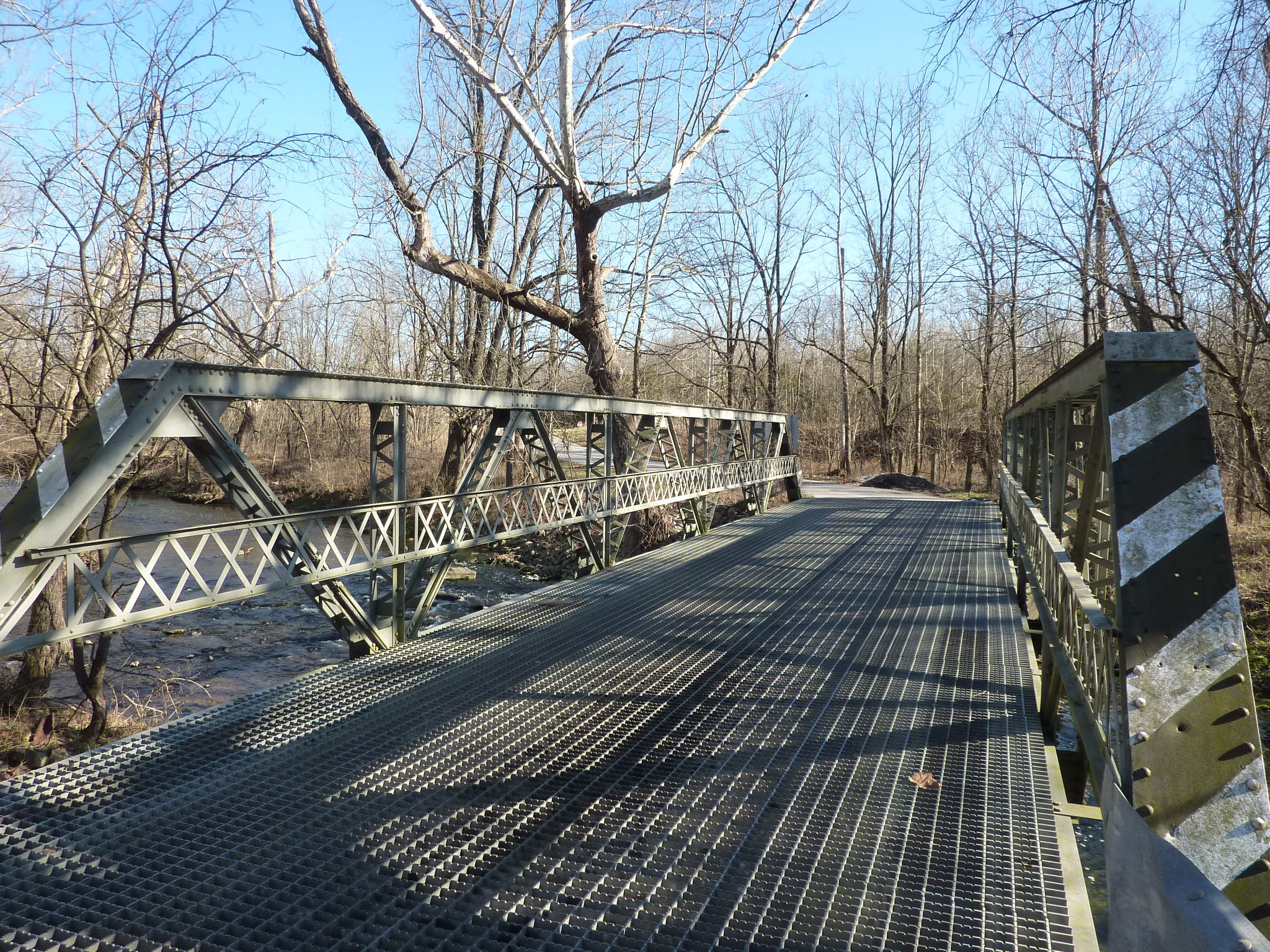
A county road crossing Clear Creek

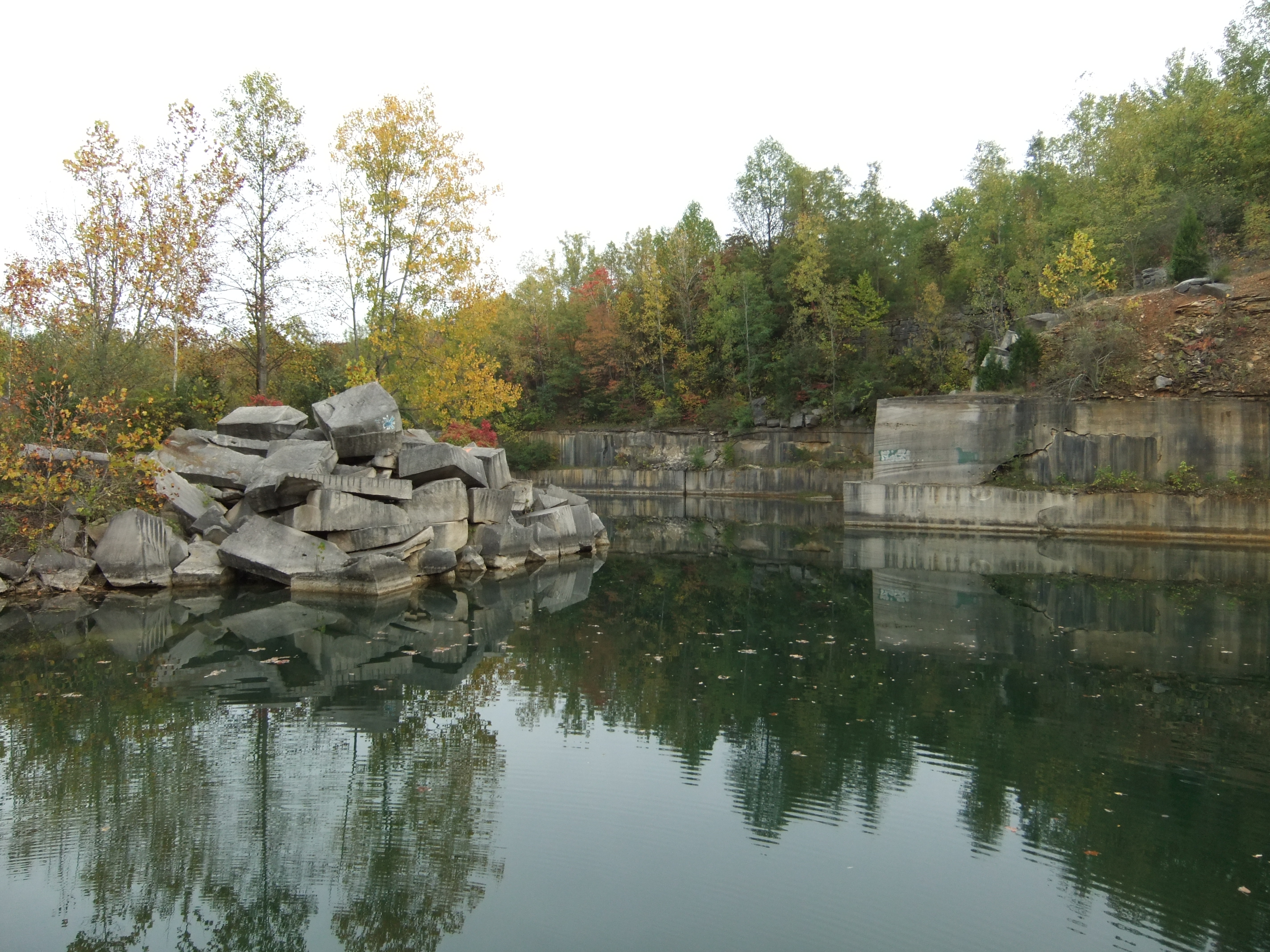
An old limestone quarry
