= Elwren, Indiana =

- Unincorporated community
- Location within Indiana Location within the United States
- Coordinates: 39°06′31″N 86°40′11″W
- Country: United States
- State: Indiana
- County: Monroe
- Township: Van Buren
- Elevation: 833 ft (254 m)
- Time zone: UTC-5 (Eastern (EST))
  - Summer (DST): UTC-4 (EDT)
- ZIP code: 47403
- Area codes: 812, 930
- FIPS code: 18-21088
- GNIS feature ID: 434146

Elwren is an unincorporated community in Van Buren Township, Monroe County, in the U.S. state of Indiana.

== History ==
Founded in 1906, Elwren had its start when the railroad was extended to that point. The name is a portmanteau of the names of founding families Eller, Whaley, Baker, and Breedon. A post office was established at Elwren in 1910, and remained in operation until it was discontinued in 1934.
