= Yellowstone, Indiana =

- Unincorporated town
- Location within Indiana Location within the United States
- Coordinates: 38°59′56″N 86°20′33″W
- Country: United States
- State: Indiana
- County: Monroe
- Township: Polk
- Elevation: 643 ft (196 m)
- Time zone: UTC-5 (Eastern (EST))
  - Summer (DST): UTC-4 (EDT)
- ZIP code: 47264
- Area codes: 812, 930
- GNIS feature ID: 451647

Yellowstone was an unincorporated town in Polk Township, Monroe County, in the U.S. state of Indiana. The site of a post office and a one-room schoolhouse, it was abandoned in the establishment of Hoosier National Forest.

== Geography ==
Yellowstone was in the southeastern corner of Monroe County. It was 18 miles (29 km) from the county seat, Bloomington.

== History ==
It was earlier called Hunters Creek. A post office was established at Yellowstone in 1887, and remained in operation until 1923. Mr Lutes was the first postmaster.

In 1888, The school enrolled 47 students in Yellowstone School District #6, one of eight schools in Polk Township at that time.

Yellowstone's population was 13 in 1900, and was 15 in 1910.

In 1911, Congress began establishing national forests, and this part of Monroe County was slated to become the Hoosier National Forest. The Forest Service began a federal buyout of farms and land in what became known as the Pleasant Run Purchase Unit, in parts of Lawrence, Monroe, Jackson, and Brown counties. Yellowstone was the final surviving village in that part of Monroe County.

In 1911, the Yellowstone School, a one-room schoolhouse, was condemned by the state's education commission, due to the building's poor condition. The school's enrollment was 31, there was no ventilation, the building flooded frequently, the foundation was deemed unsafe, and there were no toilet facilities. According to the inspectors, "the southeast corner of the building projects five or six feet over the bank of Hunter's Creek, and we were told that the water sometimes got high enough to flood the floor of the schoolroom.[...] the leafless bushes furnish the only meager protection from view to children attending to the 'natural calls of nature.'"

The population of Yellowstone was 10 in 1920, and was just 2 in 1940.

== See also ==
- Victor, Indiana
