= Smithville, Monroe County, Indiana =

Smithville, Indiana
- Unincorporated community
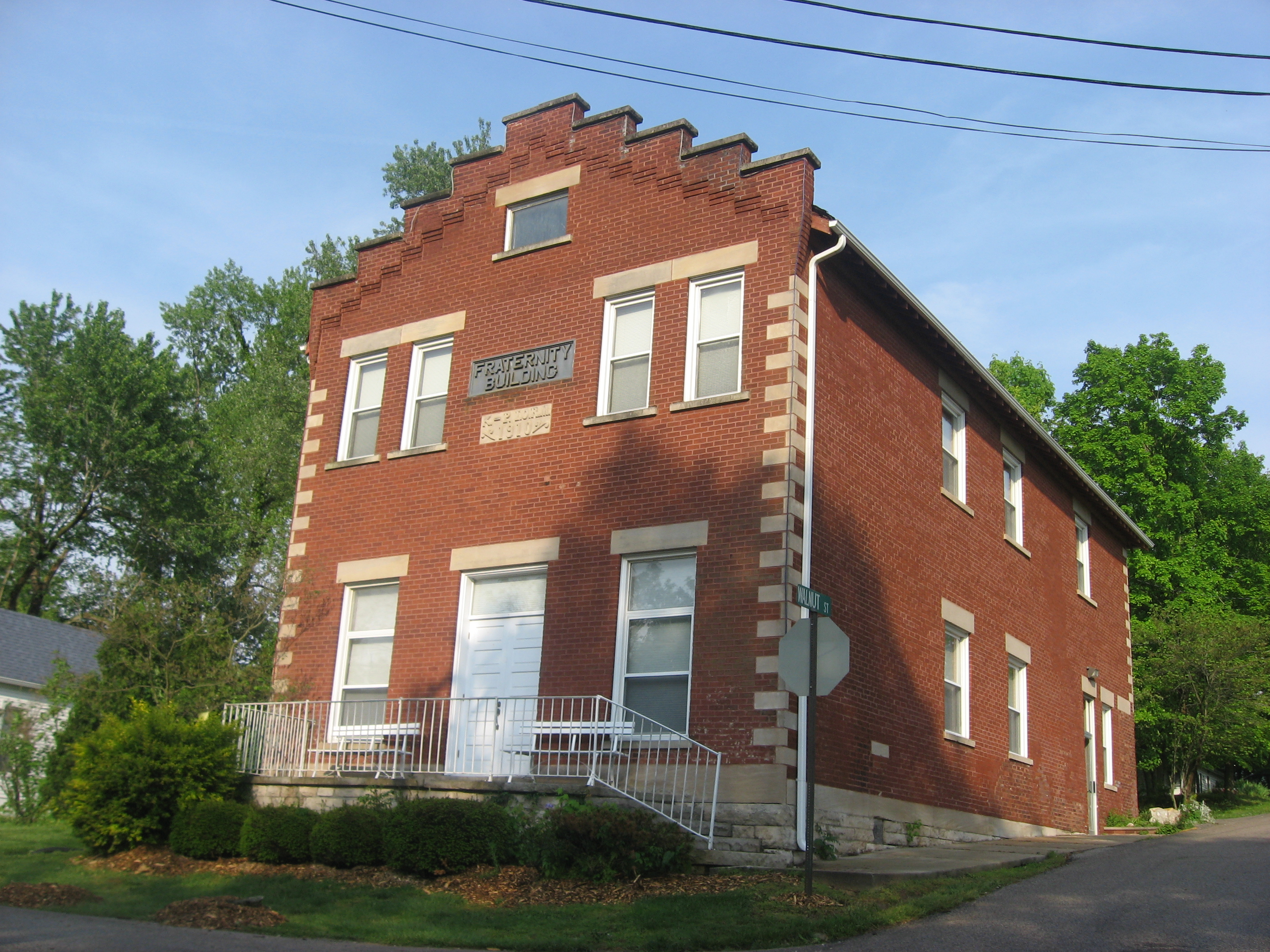
- Smithville's Red Men fraternal lodge building

- Location within Indiana Location within the United States
- Coordinates: 39°04′16″N 86°30′25″W
- Country: United States
- State: Indiana
- County: Monroe
- Township: Clear Creek
- Elevation: 732 ft (223 m)
- Time zone: UTC-5 (Eastern (EST))
  - Summer (DST): UTC-4 (EDT)
- ZIP code: 47458
- Area codes: 812, 930
- FIPS code: 18-70308
- GNIS feature ID: 452083

Smithville is an unincorporated community in Clear Creek Township, Monroe County, Indiana.

== History ==
Smithville was laid out in 1851 when the New Albany Railroad was extended to that point. The community was named for George Smith, one of the founders. A post office has been in operation at Smithville since 1854.
