= Monroe County Public Library =

Coordinates: 39°10′0″N 86°31′50″W

- Location: 303 E Kirkwood Ave; Bloomington, Indiana 47408
- Established: 1820

Access and use
- Circulation: 2.7 million
- Population served: 138,000

Other information
- Budget: $7,345,690
- Director: Grier Carson
- Employees: 153
- Website: http://www.mcpl.info

Monroe County Public Library (MCPL) serves the 138,000 citizens of Monroe County, Indiana, through the Downtown Library in downtown Bloomington, the Ellettsville Branch, the Southwest Branch, and the Bookmobile. The library's special services include the Learn and Play Space, a preschool discovery center; VITAL, an adult literacy program; CATS, a five-channel community access television network; the Indiana Room, a local history and genealogy collection and grants center (part of the Foundation Center's Cooperating Collections National Network); and service to inmates at the Monroe County Correctional Center.

== History ==
Monroe County Public Library.

The first library in Monroe County was established in 1820 in the courthouse. The Monroe Carnegie Library was dedicated in 1918. In 1965, the Bloomington Public Library merged with the Monroe County Public Library system. Library service continued in the Carnegie building until 1970 when the current building was completed. Expanded to a full city block in 1997 and renovated in 2010, the Downtown Library is a 135,000-square-foot limestone building located in downtown Bloomington near Indiana University.

The Bloomington library was one of four in the United States to install a Randtriever, a first generation automated storage and retrieval system. The system, built by Sperry Rand, was removed by the mid-1980s, due to maintenance costs and problems with the supplier.

Library services started in Ellettsville in 1968 when a storefront branch opened. The current building was dedicated in 1990 and expanded and renovated in 2009.

In 2011 the library experienced its fifteenth year of increases in circulation and library visits. That same year, circulation topped 2.7 million. The library uses the Polaris Integrated Library System and has implemented an RFID-based circulation, materials handling and inventory control system.

On March 1, 2020, the library stopped charging fines for overdue books.

== Community Outreach Services ==
Bookmobile service to rural Monroe County began in 1929 with the purchase of a Model A Ford “booktruck.” This service continues six days a week with a modern bookmobile purchased in 2011. The bookmobile travels to elementary schools, many apartment complexes, and towns in Monroe County without their own library branch.

The Library Van visits assisted living and senior living centers on a bi-weekly schedule. The library works with each facility to set up a temporary mini-library, or provides materials for each facility to distribute. As of 2018, the library offers this service to 8 different facilities around Bloomington.

House Calls Service is a free service offered to residents of Monroe County. The service delivers library materials once a month to a patron's home. It is designed for people with disabilities and those with extended illnesses.

In a cooperative agreement between the Monroe County Correctional Center and the Monroe County Public Library, Jail Library Services have been offered since 1986. Each month, the Jail Library is visited by about 200 inmates and circulates over 1,000 books. Each inmate has access to library service about once every three weeks.

Volunteers in Tutoring Adult Learners (VITAL) is a program where volunteers are trained to provide adults one on one tutoring. VITAL has two main areas of focus: adult literacy, and English as a new language. The program is free for volunteers and learners. The main branch of the library has a collection specifically geared toward the VITAL program.

== Awards ==
- In the 2010 HAPLR Rankings, MCPL was ranked 3rd in its class. MCPL has been ranked in the top ten of libraries serving 100k populations, every year since 2005.
- CATS won several awards in The 2011 National Hometown Video Awards of the Alliance for Community Media.
- The Indiana Library Federation recognized MCPL with its Danny Gunnells Intellectual Freedom Award in 2004.
- The Greater Bloomington Chamber of Commerce has honored MCPL with its Workforce Development Award in 2007 and Trailblazer through Technology Award in 2011.
- MCPL has received a “Best of Show” award for best promotional video from the American Library Association's "PR Xchange" for its 2009 Children's Summer Reading video, “Be Creative @ your library.”
- The library's adult literacy program (VITAL) has received a Volunteer Program Award from Ivy Tech's Center for Civic Engagement in 2006, the Indiana Library Federation's Tom Zupancic Award for the support of literacy and libraries in 2008, and a Be More Knowledgeable Award from the City of Bloomington in 2011.
- In 2017, MCPL won the ALA Excellence in Library Programming Award for their series "Discuss, Meet, and Act: The Power of Words" which focused on how an individual can make positive change in the world.
