= National Register of Historic Places listings in Owen County, Indiana =

Location of Owen County in Indiana

This is a list of the National Register of Historic Places listings in Owen County, Indiana.

This is intended to be a complete list of the properties and districts on the National Register of Historic Places in Owen County, Indiana, United States. Latitude and longitude coordinates are provided for many National Register properties and districts; these locations may be seen together in a map.

There are 18 properties and districts listed on the National Register in the county. Another property was once listed but has been removed.

Properties and districts located in incorporated areas display the name of the municipality, while properties and districts in unincorporated areas display the name of their civil township. Properties and districts split between multiple jurisdictions display the names of all jurisdictions.

This National Park Service list is complete through NPS recent listings posted September 26, 2025.

== Current listings ==
	Name on the Register	Image	Date listed	Location	City or town	Description
1	Allison-Robinson House	Allison-Robinson House	June 3, 1993 (#93000468)	3 N. Montgomery St. 39°17′11″N 86°45′49″W	Spencer	
2	David Enoch Beem House	David Enoch Beem House	July 13, 1989 (#89000771)	635 W. Hillside Ave. 39°17′25″N 86°46′09″W	Spencer	
3	Cataract Covered Bridge	Cataract Covered Bridge	April 27, 2005 (#05000339)	Junction of County Roads 235W and 1000N over Mill Creek in the Leiber State Recreation Area at Cataract; 39°26′00″N 86°48′48″W	Jennings Township	
4	CCC Recreation Building-Nature Museum	CCC Recreation Building-Nature Museum	March 18, 1993 (#93000176)	McCormick's Creek State Park, west of the junction of State Roads 43 and 46, and east of Spencer; 39°17′30″N 86°43′38″W	Washington Township	
5	Ennis Archaeological Site (12 OW 229)	Ennis Archaeological Site (12 OW 229)	May 30, 1985 (#85001167)	Address Restricted	Clay Township	Extends into Monroe County
6	Gosport Historic District	Gosport Historic District	June 25, 2013 (#13000425)	Roughly bounded by Church, Walnut, 5th, and 3rd Sts. 39°20′57″N 86°39′48″W	Gosport	
7	McCormick's Creek State Park Entrance and Gatehouse	McCormick's Creek State Park Entrance and Gatehouse	March 18, 1993 (#93000175)	McCormick's Creek State Park, west of the junction of State Roads 43 and 46, and east of Spencer; 39°17′02″N 86°43′34″W	Washington Township	
8	Moffett-Ralston House	Moffett-Ralston House	May 12, 1975 (#75000010)	1.5 miles northeast of Patricksburg on Bixler Rd. 39°19′28″N 86°55′26″W	Lafayette Township	
9	Dr. H. G. Osgood House	Dr. H. G. Osgood House	September 3, 1999 (#99001075)	11 E. North St. 39°21′01″N 86°39′56″W	Gosport	
10	Owen County Courthouse	Owen County Courthouse	November 25, 1994 (#94001351)	Courthouse Square; 39°17′08″N 86°45′43″W	Spencer	
11	Secrest Ferry Bridge	Secrest Ferry Bridge	May 30, 1996 (#96000603)	County Road 450E over the West Fork of the White River, south of Gosport; 39°19′57″N 86°40′35″W	Wayne Township	Extends into Monroe County
12	Secrest-Wampler House	Secrest-Wampler House	March 20, 2002 (#02000199)	1816 Concord Rd., southwest of Gosport; 39°18′59″N 86°42′06″W	Washington Township	
13	Spencer Courthouse Square Historic District		August 24, 2020 (#100005510)	Roughly Franklin, Washington, Market and Main Sts. between Montgomery, Morgan, Harrison, and Jefferson Sts. 39°17′10″N 86°45′41″W	Spencer	
14	Spencer Presbyterian Church and Manse		August 31, 2020 (#100005511)	154 North Main St. 39°17′15″N 86°45′45″W	Spencer	
15	Spencer Public Library	Spencer Public Library	September 20, 2007 (#07000980)	110 E. Market St. 39°17′05″N 86°45′38″W	Spencer	
16	Spencer Town Hall and Fire Station	Spencer Town Hall and Fire Station	August 19, 1982 (#82000027)	84 S. Washington St. 39°17′07″N 86°45′40″W	Spencer	Used as a law office (2005)
17	Stone Arch Bridge over McCormick's Creek	Stone Arch Bridge over McCormick's Creek	March 18, 1993 (#93000177)	McCormick's Creek State Park, west of the junction of State Roads 43 and 46, and east of Spencer; 39°17′25″N 86°43′02″W	Washington Township	
18	Vandalia Methodist Episcopal Church and Vandalia School	Vandalia Methodist Episcopal Church and Vandalia School	June 3, 2019 (#100004045)	5434 and 5465 Vandalia Rd. 39°18′50″N 86°52′04″W	Vandalia	

== Former listing ==
	Name on the Register	Image	Date listed	Date removed	Location	City or town	Description
1	New Albany and Salem Railroad Station		August 6, 1976 (#76000015)	October 13, 1983	North St. at the White River; 39°21′01″N 86°39′35″W	Gosport	

== See also ==
- List of National Historic Landmarks in Indiana
- National Register of Historic Places listings in Indiana
- Listings in neighboring counties: Clay, Greene, Monroe, Morgan, Putnam
- List of Indiana state historical markers in Owen County
