= List of Indiana state historical markers in Owen County =

Location of Owen County in Indiana

This is a list of the Indiana state historical markers in Owen County.

This is intended to be a complete list of the official state historical markers placed in Owen County, Indiana, United States by the Indiana Historical Bureau. The locations of the historical markers and their latitude and longitude coordinates are included below when available, along with their names, years of placement, and topics as recorded by the Historical Bureau. There are 3 historical markers located in Owen County.

== Historical markers ==
Marker title	Image	Year placed	Location	Topics
Camp Hughes		1966	In a roadside park at the junction of State Road 67 and 7th Street in Gosport; 39°21′17″N 86°40′4″W	Military
Owen County Courthouse		1997	Southwestern corner of the courthouse lawn in Spencer; 39°17′7″N 86°45′44″W	Buildings and Architecture, Government Institutions
Cataract Falls Covered Bridge		2008	Cataract Covered Bridge in the Lieber State Recreation Area near Cataract; 39°26′0″N 86°48′47″W	[none]

== See also ==
- List of Indiana state historical markers
- National Register of Historic Places listings in Owen County, Indiana
