= Wayne Township, Kansas =

Wayne Township, Kansas may refer to the following places:

- Wayne Township, Doniphan County, Kansas
- Wayne Township, Edwards County, Kansas

See also

- Wayne Township (disambiguation)
