= Wayne Township, Missouri =

Wayne Township, Missouri may refer to the following places:

- Wayne Township, Bollinger County, Missouri
- Wayne Township, Buchanan County, Missouri

See also

- Wayne Township (disambiguation)
