= Wayne Township, Indiana =

Wayne Township is the name of sixteen townships in Indiana:

- Wayne Township, Allen County, Indiana
- Wayne Township, Bartholomew County, Indiana
- Wayne Township, Fulton County, Indiana
- Wayne Township, Hamilton County, Indiana
- Wayne Township, Henry County, Indiana
- Wayne Township, Huntington County, Indiana
- Wayne Township, Jay County, Indiana
- Wayne Township, Kosciusko County, Indiana
- Wayne Township, Marion County, Indiana
- Wayne Township, Montgomery County, Indiana
- Wayne Township, Noble County, Indiana
- Wayne Township, Owen County, Indiana
- Wayne Township, Randolph County, Indiana
- Wayne Township, Starke County, Indiana
- Wayne Township, Tippecanoe County, Indiana
- Wayne Township, Wayne County, Indiana

== See also ==
- Wayne Township (disambiguation)
