= Beem =

Beem is a surname. Notable people with the surname include:

- David Enoch Beem (1837–1923), lawyer, banker, and American Civil War veteran
- Eva and Abraham Beem (born 1930s), Holocaust victims
- Frances Beem (1881–1971), early 20th century American author and illustrator
- Rich Beem (born 1970), American professional golfer
- Matthew Beem (born 1997), American YouTuber
- Sophie Beem (born 1999), American singer and songwriter

== See also ==
- Beam (disambiguation) § People
