= New Albany and Salem Railroad Station =

New Albany and Salem Railroad Station may refer to:

- New Albany and Salem Railroad Station (Gosport, Indiana), listed on the National Register of Historic Places in Owen County, Indiana
- New Albany and Salem Railroad Station (New Albany, Indiana), listed on the National Register of Historic Places in Floyd County, Indiana
