= Wayne Township =

Wayne Township may refer to:

== Illinois ==
- Wayne Township, DuPage County, Illinois

== Indiana ==
- Wayne Township, Allen County, Indiana
- Wayne Township, Bartholomew County, Indiana
- Wayne Township, Fulton County, Indiana
- Wayne Township, Hamilton County, Indiana
- Wayne Township, Henry County, Indiana
- Wayne Township, Huntington County, Indiana
- Wayne Township, Jay County, Indiana
- Wayne Township, Kosciusko County, Indiana
- Wayne Township, Marion County, Indiana
  - Metropolitan School District of Wayne Township
- Wayne Township, Montgomery County, Indiana
- Wayne Township, Noble County, Indiana
- Wayne Township, Owen County, Indiana
- Wayne Township, Randolph County, Indiana
- Wayne Township, Starke County, Indiana
- Wayne Township, Tippecanoe County, Indiana
- Wayne Township, Wayne County, Indiana

== Iowa ==
- Wayne Township, Henry County, Iowa
- Wayne Township, Jones County, Iowa
- Wayne Township, Mitchell County, Iowa
- Wayne Township, Monroe County, Iowa

== Kansas ==
- Wayne Township, Doniphan County, Kansas
- Wayne Township, Edwards County, Kansas

== Michigan ==
- Wayne Township, Cass County, Michigan

== Missouri ==
- Wayne Township, Bollinger County, Missouri
- Wayne Township, Buchanan County, Missouri

== Nebraska ==
- Wayne Township, Custer County, Nebraska

== North Dakota ==
- Wayne Township, Bottineau County, North Dakota

== New Jersey ==
- Wayne Township, Passaic County, New Jersey

== Ohio ==
- Wayne Township, Adams County, Ohio
- Wayne Township, Ashtabula County, Ohio
- Wayne Township, Auglaize County, Ohio
- Wayne Township, Belmont County, Ohio
- Wayne Township, Butler County, Ohio
- Wayne Township, Champaign County, Ohio
- Wayne Township, Clermont County, Ohio
- Wayne Township, Clinton County, Ohio
- Wayne Township, Columbiana County, Ohio
- Wayne Township, Darke County, Ohio
- Wayne Township, Fayette County, Ohio
- Wayne Township, Jefferson County, Ohio
- Wayne Township, Knox County, Ohio
- Wayne Township, Mercer County, Ohio
- Wayne Township, Monroe County, Ohio
- Wayne Township, Montgomery County, Ohio, defunct
- Wayne Township, Muskingum County, Ohio
- Wayne Township, Noble County, Ohio
- Wayne Township, Pickaway County, Ohio
- Wayne Township, Tuscarawas County, Ohio
- Wayne Township, Warren County, Ohio
- Wayne Township, Wayne County, Ohio
- Huber Heights, Ohio, formerly Wayne Township

== Pennsylvania ==
- Wayne Township, Armstrong County, Pennsylvania
- Wayne Township, Clinton County, Pennsylvania
- Wayne Township, Crawford County, Pennsylvania
- Wayne Township, Dauphin County, Pennsylvania
- Wayne Township, Erie County, Pennsylvania
- Wayne Township, Greene County, Pennsylvania
- Wayne Township, Lawrence County, Pennsylvania
- Wayne Township, Mifflin County, Pennsylvania
- Wayne Township, Schuylkill County, Pennsylvania

== South Dakota ==
- Wayne Township, Hanson County, South Dakota, in Hanson County, South Dakota
- Wayne Township, Lake County, South Dakota, in Lake County, South Dakota
- Wayne Township, Minnehaha County, South Dakota, in Minnehaha County, South Dakota
