= Owen County Courthouse =

Owen County Courthouse may refer to:

- Owen County Courthouse (Indiana), Spencer, Indiana
- Owen County Courthouse and Jail, Owenton, Kentucky
