= McCormick's Creek State Park =

State park in Owen County, Indiana

- IUCN category III (natural monument or feature)
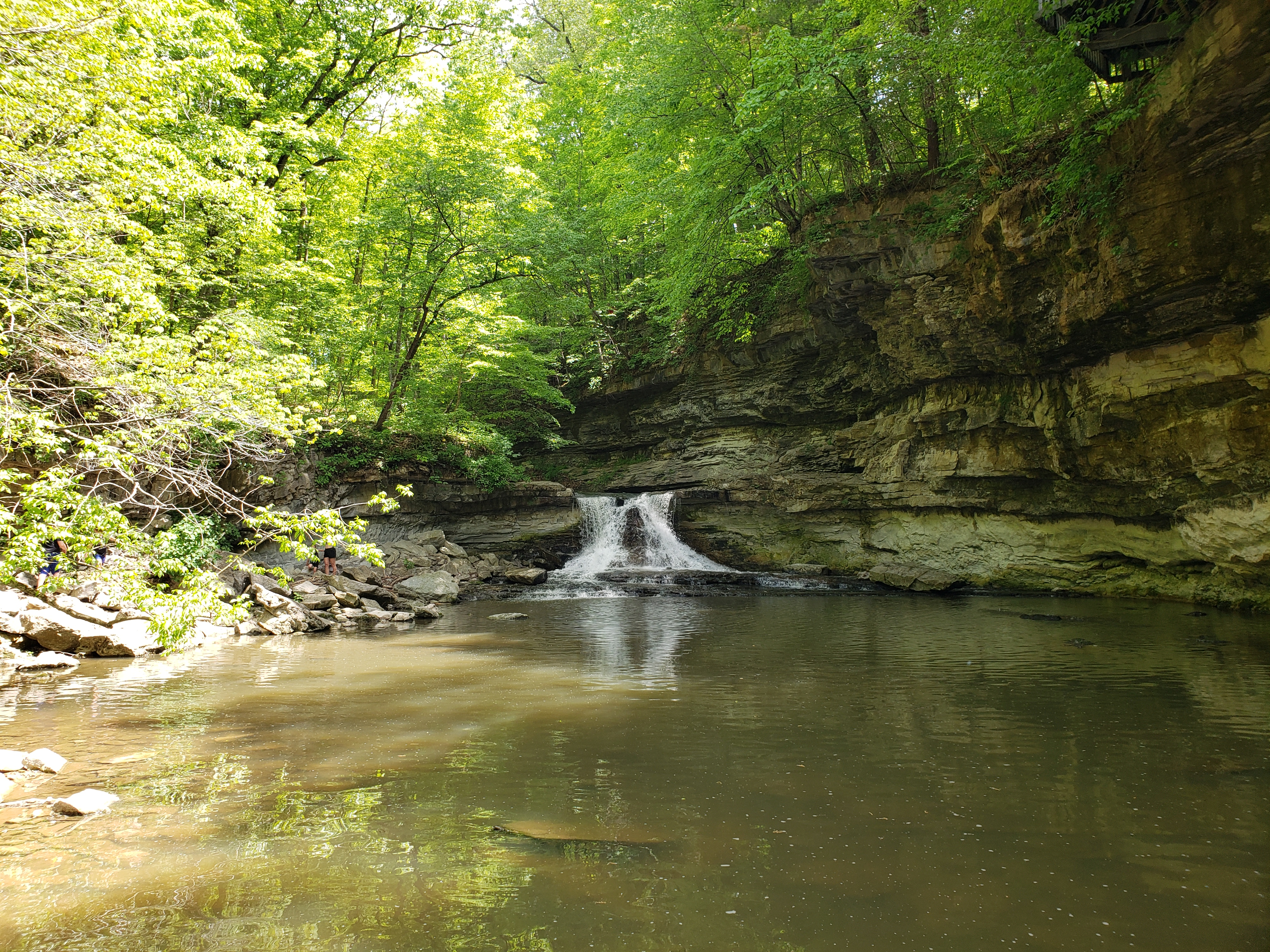

- Location within Indiana
- Location: Owen County, Indiana, USA
- Nearest city: Spencer, Indiana
- Coordinates: 39°17′40″N 86°43′40″W
- Area: 1,924 acres (7.79 km^{2})
- Established: 1916
- Visitors: 641,437 (in 2018–2019)
- Governing body: Indiana Department of Natural Resources

McCormick's Creek State Park is the oldest state park in the U.S. state of Indiana, dedicated on July 4, 1916, as part of the state's centennial celebration. It is located 14 miles (23 km) west of Bloomington in Owen County. The park receives about 640,000 visitors annually.

The park is 1 of 14 Indiana State Parks that are in the path of totality for the 2024 solar eclipse, with the park seeing 4 minutes and 1 second of totality.

== History ==
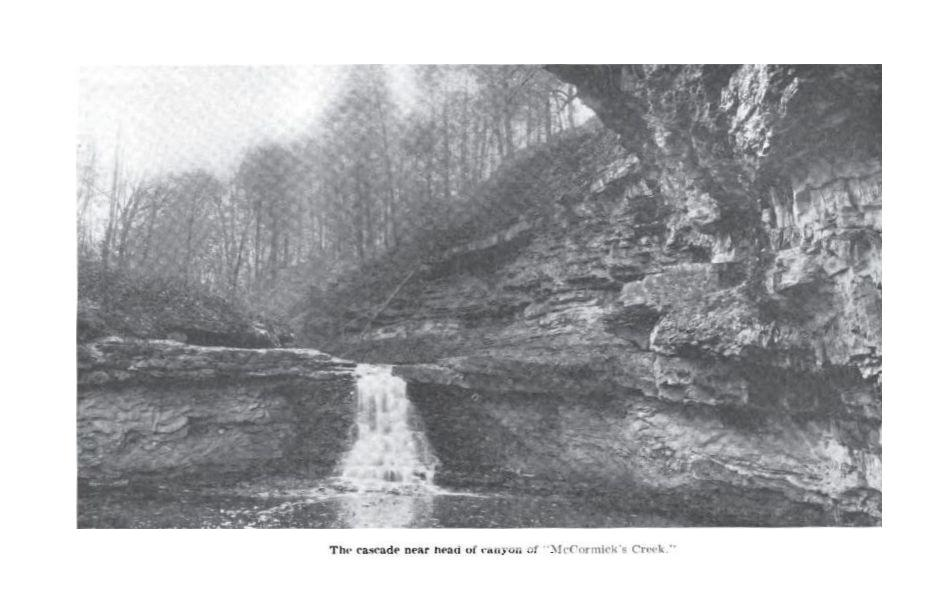
McCormick's Creek Falls in 1917

The park was named after the area's first settler, John McCormick, who settled on 100 acres (0.40 km^{2}) there in 1816, along the canyon by the waterfalls. Up to that time, the land had been hunted by Miami Indians. McCormick's Creek Falls is the main attraction at McCormick's Creek State Park.

On May 12, 1916, a local newspaper editor suggested to an Indiana state legislator that the McCormick's Creek area would be a suitable location for a state park. German-born Indianapolis businessman Richard Lieber championed the idea of establishing a system of state parks for Indiana, and, after winning the property at auction with a bid of $5,250, received it from the Dr. Frederick Denkewalter estate. McCormick's Creek was formally opened on December 11, 1916; the centennial birthday of Indiana. In 1927 a naturalist program was started, a first for Indiana and the United States.

Much of the infrastructure of the park was built by the Civilian Conservation Corps during Franklin D. Roosevelt's New Deal era, and many of the CCC-built structures, retaining walls, and elegant, arched limestone bridges remain in use today. The park entrance gatehouse, former nature center, and a stone arch bridge over McCormick's Creek were listed on the National Register of Historic Places in 1993. There are eight numbered hiking trails in the park, accessing features and park attractions, which include a 90-foot (27 m) fire tower, a scenic ravine and waterfall, small cave, sinkhole formations, and towering stands of second-growth Midwestern hardwoods. The park also features a fine system of equestrian paths.

The Canyon Inn, a former sanitarium that now hosts guests for the night, is also on-site. Key features include an Olympic-sized swimming pool and overnight camping access. In addition, the Old State House quarry is a source of the Indiana limestone used in the Indiana State Capitol building.

== Canyon and waterfall ==
The heart of the park is McCormick's Creek Canyon. The upper levels of the canyon are around 700 feet (210 m) above sea levels, dropping to the west fork of the White River which is near 540 feet (160 m). The McCormick's Creek waterfall is a primary attraction of the park, as Indiana has few waterfalls due to the relatively flat topography of the state.

== Hiking trails ==
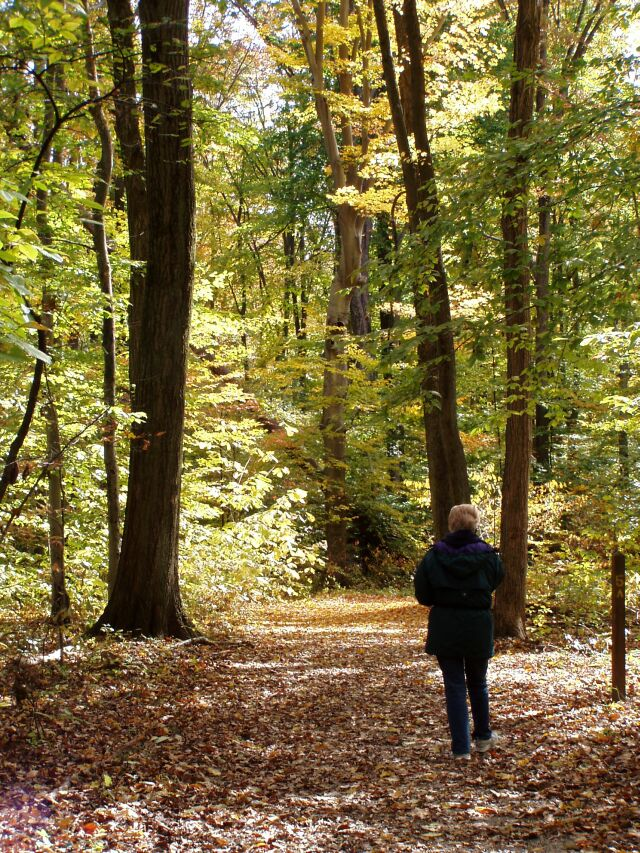
Wolf Cave Trail

Wolf Cave Nature Preserve

Trail #5. The Wolf Cave Trail is considered to be of moderate difficulty. The trail is 2 miles (3.2 km) long, and it loops through the Wolf Cave Nature Preserve. It is relatively level with a drop into a shallow valley. The trail begins at the Wolf Cave Parking Area. The forest along the route is a Beech-Maple forest. Wolf Cave was formed by the collapse of a cave, leaving only the middle section 'the cave' still roofed.

McCormick's Creek Falls Trail

Trail #3. This short 0.8 miles (1.3 km) is considered rugged. The trail begins across from Canyon Inn and drops down before rising at the edge of McCormick's Creek Canyon. The trail access and overlook parking lot here before descending to the bottom of the canyon. There are no bridges across the creek. Fluctuating water levels makes some areas seasonably inaccessible. The trail ends at Stoney Restroom, a short walk back to the Canyon Inn.

McCormick's Cove Nature Preserve

== Gallery ==
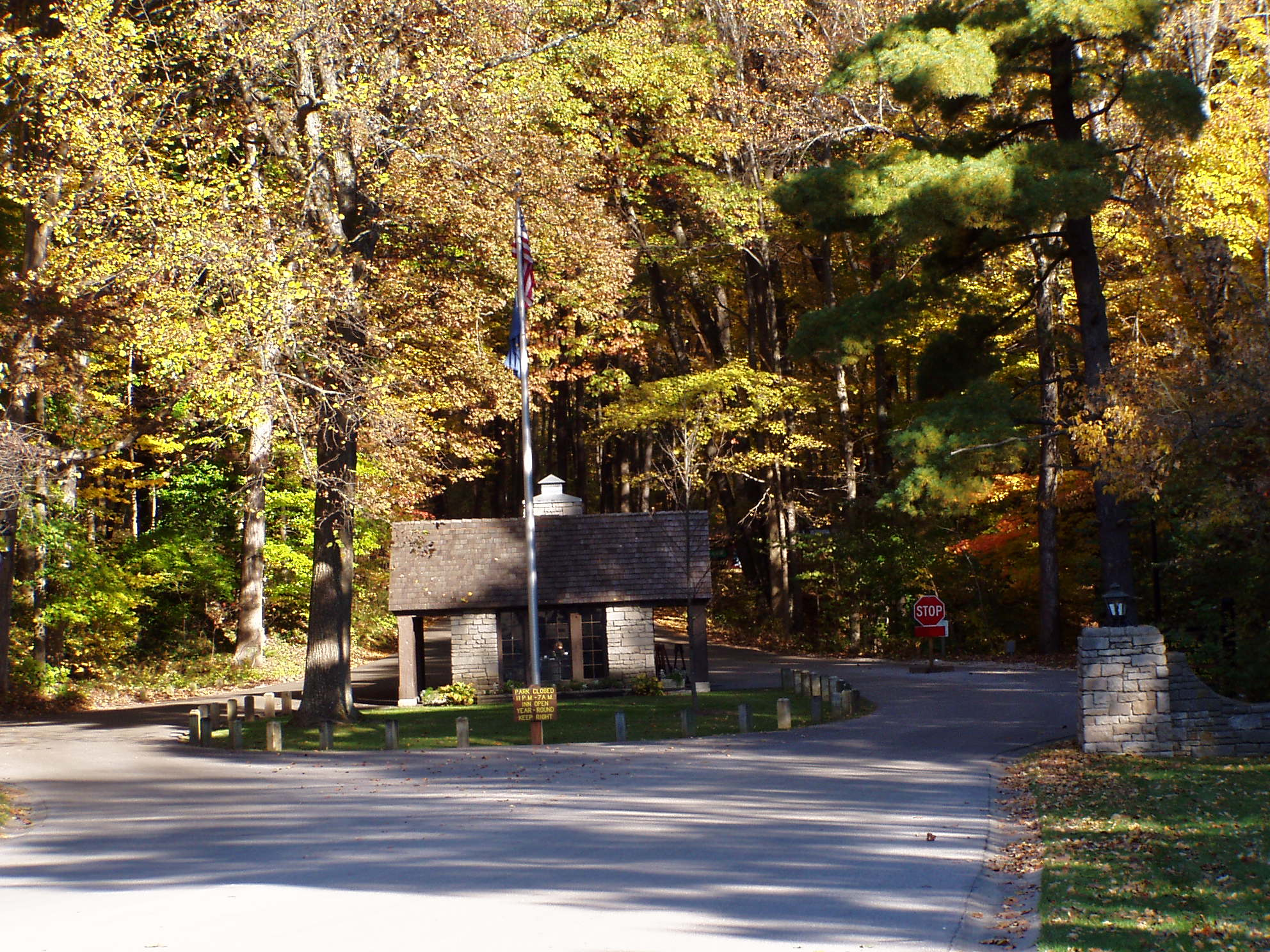
Park entrance

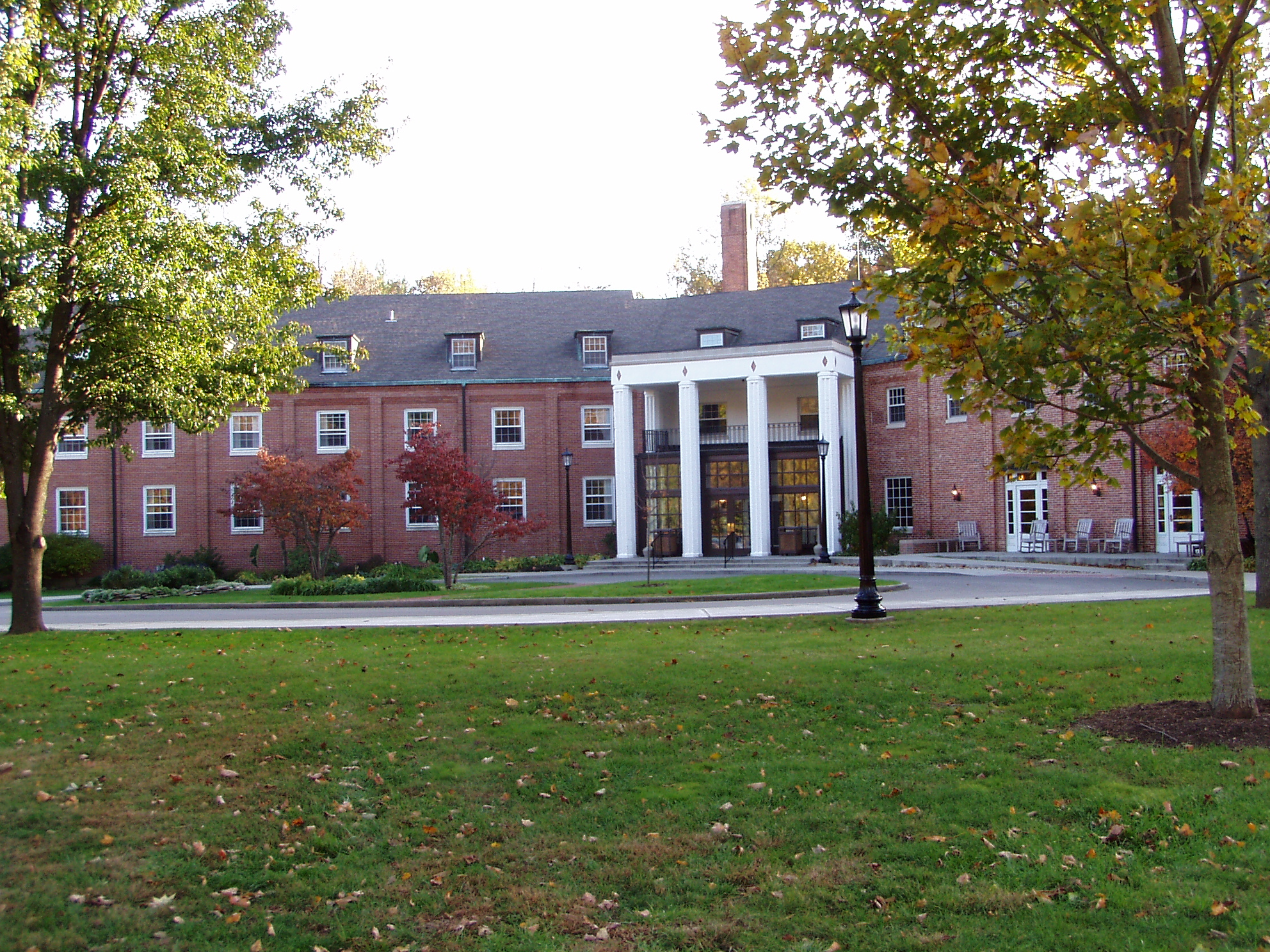
Canyon Inn

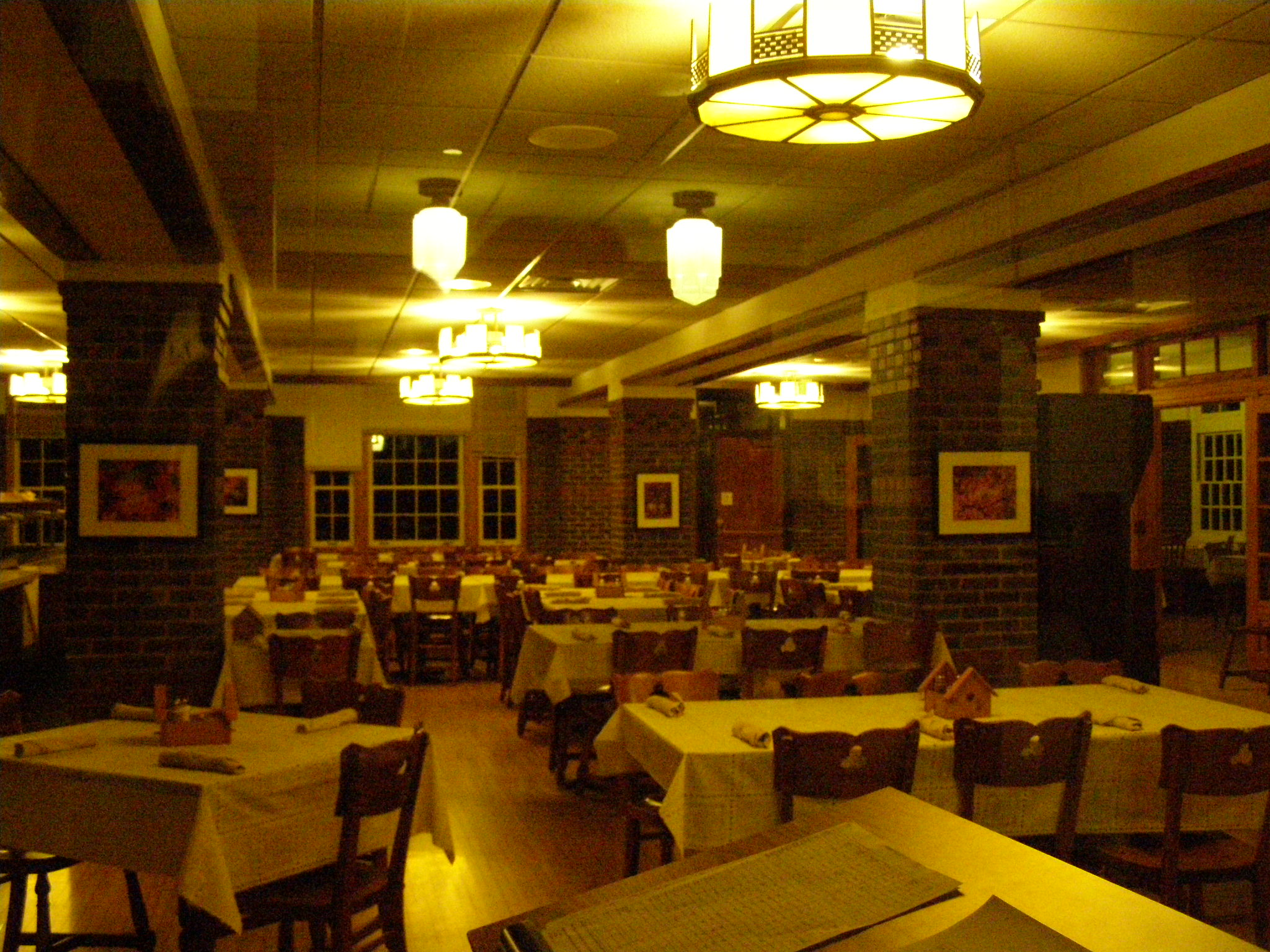
Inn dining room

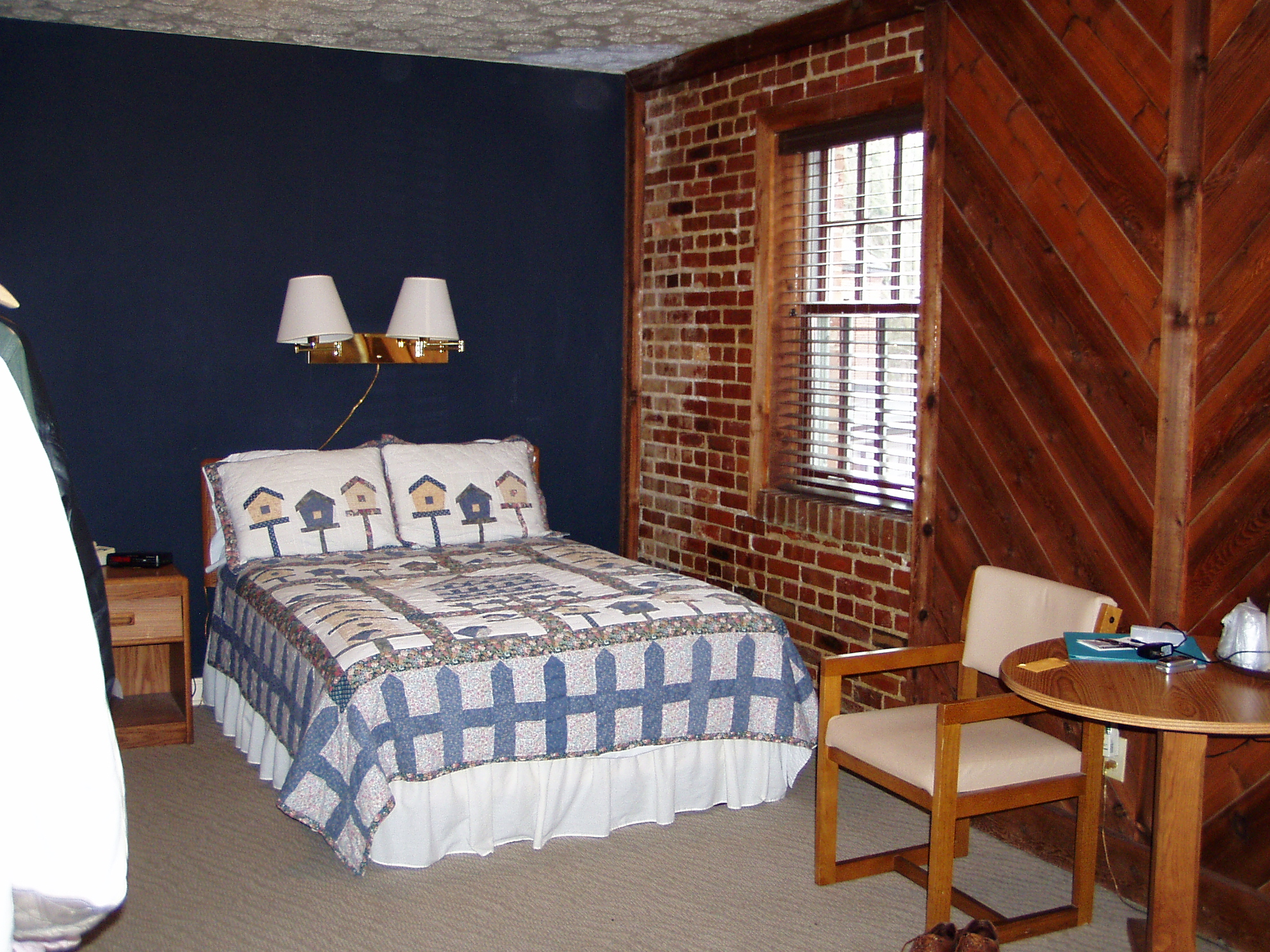
Inn guest room

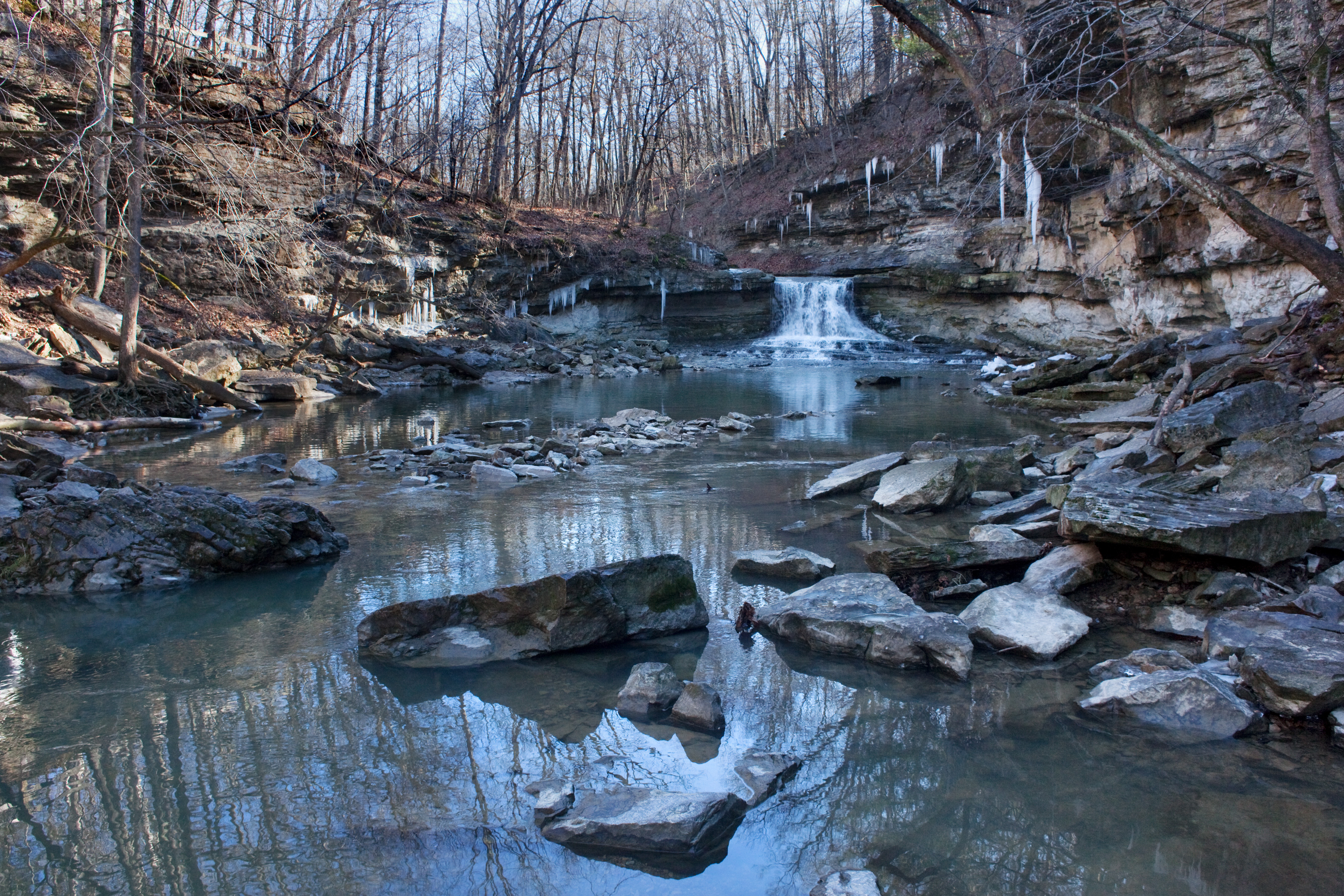
Creek and waterfall during the winter

== See also ==
- List of Indiana state parks
