= CCC Recreation Building-Nature Museum =

- U.S. National Register of Historic Places
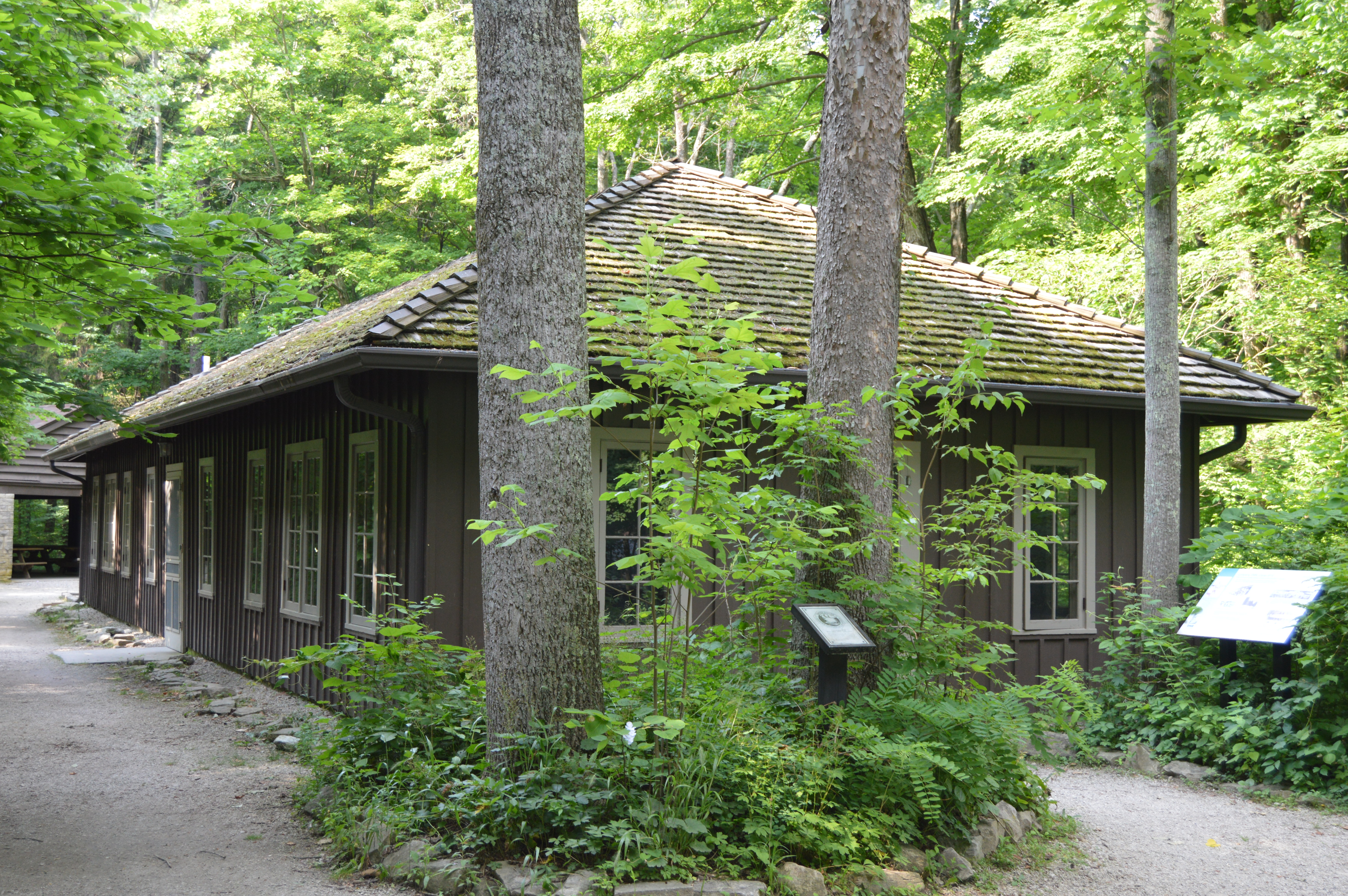
- Front and western side

- Location within Indiana Location within the United States
- Location: McCormick's Creek State Park, west of the junction of State Roads 43 and 46, and east of Spencer in Washington Township, Owen County, Indiana
- Coordinates: 39°17′29″N 86°43′37″W
- Area: less than one acre
- Built: 1936
- Architect: Civilian Conservation Corps (CCC)
- Architectural style: Rustic Functional
- MPS: New Deal Resources in Indiana State Parks MPS
- NRHP reference No.: 93000176
- Added to NRHP: March 18, 1993

CCC Recreation Building-Nature Museum is a historic building located at McCormick's Creek State Park in Washington Township, Owen County, Indiana. It was built by the Civilian Conservation Corps in 1933, and is a one-story, frame building with board-and-batten siding and American Craftsman style design elements. It consists of a rectangular hip roofed main section, with a gabled wing. The wing features a large stone fireplace. The building was rehabilitated for use as a nature museum by the Works Progress Administration in 1936, and remained in that use into the 1970s.

It was listed on the National Register of Historic Places in 1993.
