= Secrest Ferry Bridge =

- U.S. National Register of Historic Places
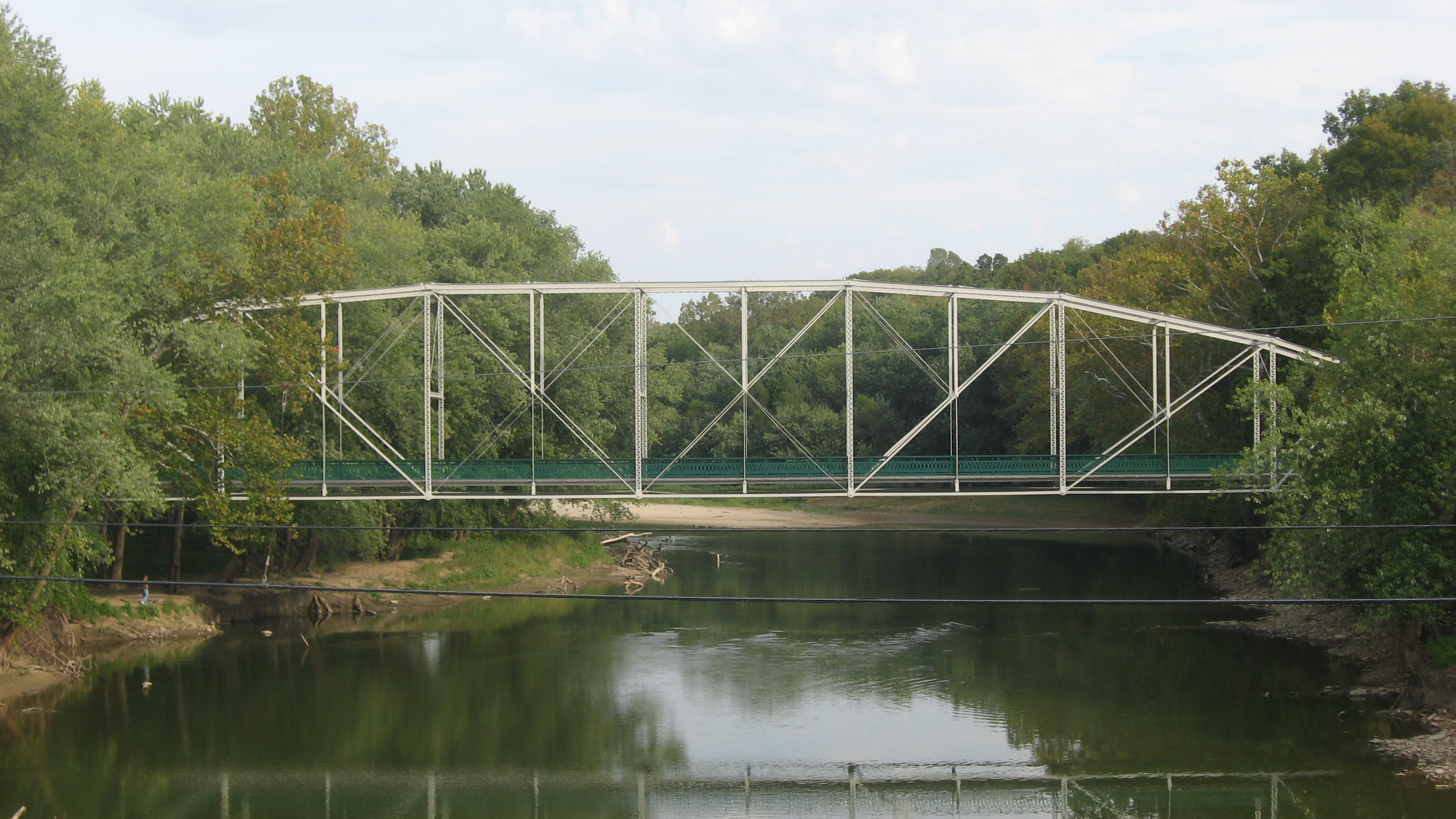
- Secrest Ferry Bridge, September 2010

- Location within Indiana Location within the United States
- Location: County Road 450E over the West Fork of the White River, south of Gosport in Bean Blossom Township, Monroe County, Indiana and Wayne Township, Owen County, Indiana
- Coordinates: 39°19′57″N 86°40′35″W
- Area: less than one acre
- Built: 1903
- Built by: Lafayette Engineering Co.; Vincennes Bridge Co.
- Architectural style: Pennsylvania through truss
- NRHP reference No.: 96000603
- Added to NRHP: May 30, 1996

Secrest Ferry Bridge is a historic Pennsylvania through truss bridge located in Bean Blossom Township, Monroe County, Indiana and Wayne Township, Owen County, Indiana. It was built by the Lafayette Engineering Co. and Vincennes Bridge Co. in 1903. It is a single-span bridge of 316 feet in length and spans the West Fork of the White River.

It was listed on the National Register of Historic Places in 1996.
