= McCormick's Creek State Park Entrance and Gatehouse =

- U.S. National Register of Historic Places
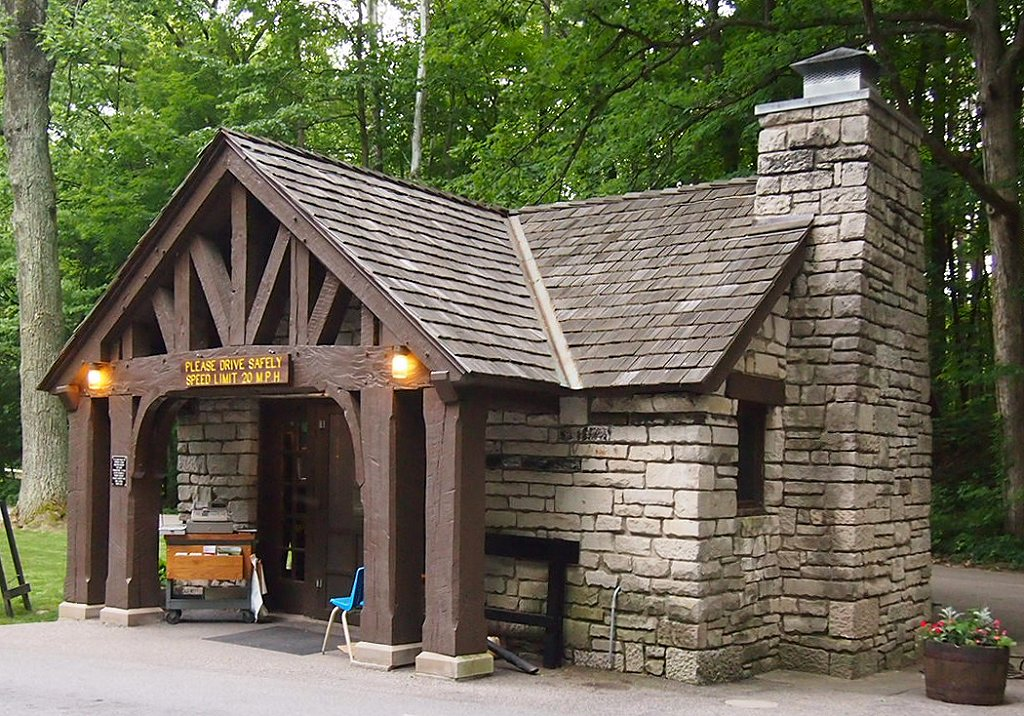
- McCormick's Creek State Park Gatehouse, June 2013

- Location within Indiana Location within the United States
- Location: McCormick's Creek State Park, west of the junction of State Roads 43 and 46, and east of Spencer in Washington Township, Owen County, Indiana
- Coordinates: 39°17′02″N 86°43′34″W
- Area: 1 acre (0.40 ha)
- Built: 1935
- Built by: Civilian Conservation Corps
- Architectural style: Park Rustic
- MPS: New Deal Resources in Indiana State Parks MPS
- NRHP reference No.: 93000175
- Added to NRHP: March 18, 1993

McCormick's Creek State Park Entrance and Gatehouse is a historic gatehouse situated in McCormick's Creek State Park, located in Washington Township, Owen County, Indiana. Constructed in 1935 by the Civilian Conservation Corps, it is a one-story, T-shaped building made of limestone in the Rustic style with a gable roof. The building features a large limestone fireplace chimney and an open entrance porch. Adjacent to the gatehouse, there are two sections of a stone and timber fence that contribute to its overall historic character..

In recognition of its significance, the gatehouse was listed on the National Register of Historic Places in 1993.
