= Bean Blossom Township, Monroe County, Indiana =

Bean Blossom Township
- Township
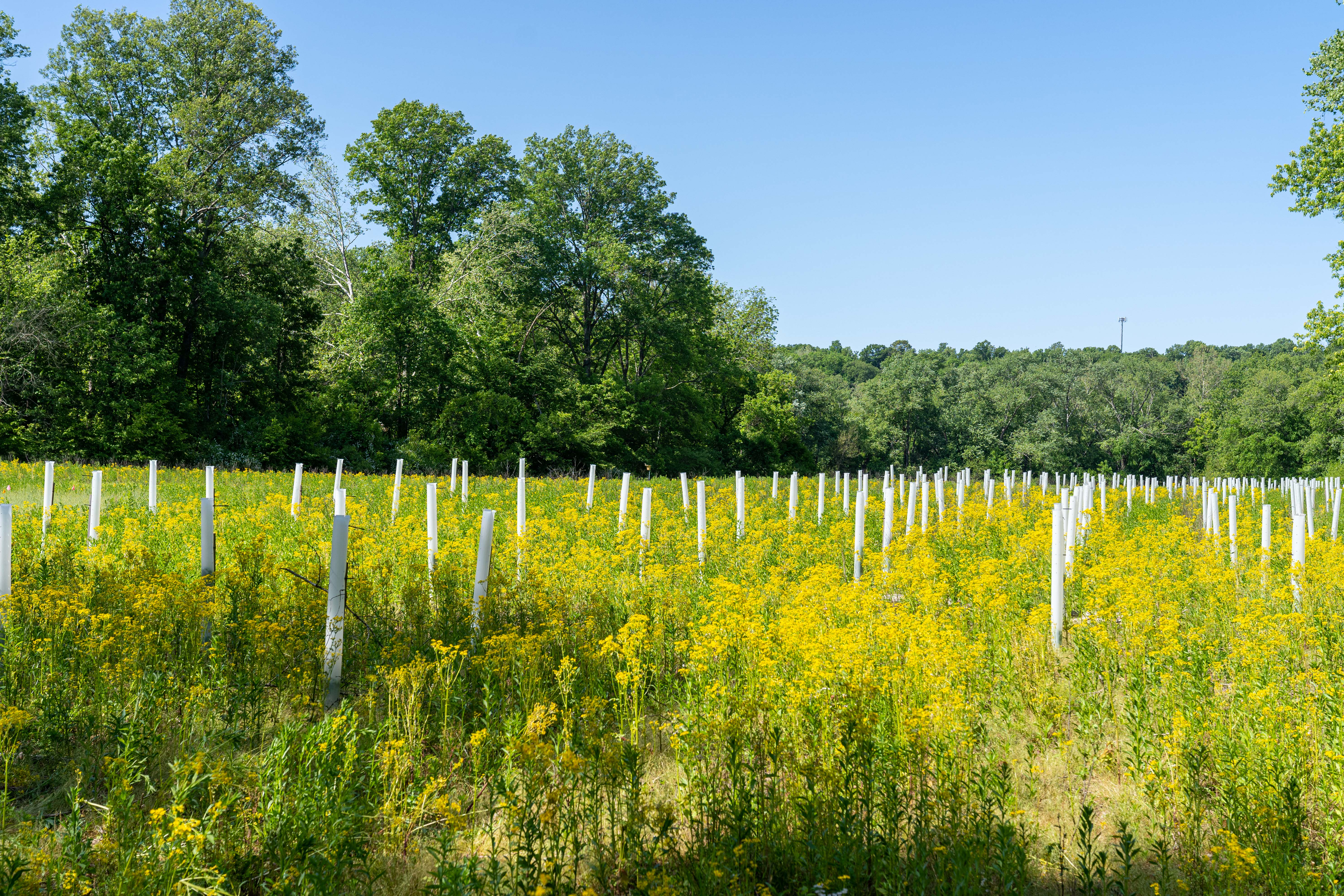
- Field at Bean Blossom Township

- Location in Monroe County
- Coordinates: 39°17′46″N 86°37′18″W
- Country: United States
- State: Indiana
- County: Monroe

Government
  - Type: Indiana township

Area
  - Total: 36.35 sq mi (94.1 km^{2})
  - Land: 36.34 sq mi (94.1 km^{2})
  - Water: 0.01 sq mi (0.026 km^{2}) 0.03%
- Elevation: 750 ft (230 m)

Population (2020)
  - Total: 2,941
  - Density: 80.2/sq mi (31.0/km^{2})
- Time zone: UTC-5 (Eastern (EST))
  - Summer (DST): UTC-4 (EDT)
- ZIP codes: 47404, 47429, 47433, 47464
- Area codes: 812, 930
- GNIS feature ID: 453100

Bean Blossom Township is one of eleven townships in Monroe County, Indiana, United States. As of the 2010 census, its population was 2,916 and it contained 1,184 housing units.

== History ==
Secrest Ferry Bridge was listed on the National Register of Historic Places in 1996.

== Geography ==
According to the 2010 census, the township has a total area of 36.35 square miles (94.1 km^{2}), of which 36.34 square miles (94.1 km^{2}) (or 99.97%) is land and 0.01 square miles (0.026 km^{2}) (or 0.03%) is water. The White River defines the northwest boundary of the township.

=== Cities, towns, villages ===
- Ellettsville (northwest edge)
- Stinesville

=== Unincorporated towns ===
- Mount Tabor at 39.3114349°N 86.6333347°W

=== Cemeteries ===
The township contains these four cemeteries: Ellett, King, Mount Carmel and Van Buskirk.

=== Major highways ===
- Indiana State Road 46

== School districts ==
- Richland-Bean Blossom Community School Corporation

== Political districts ==
- Indiana's 4th congressional district
- State House District 46
- State Senate District 37
