= David Enoch Beem =

American lawyer

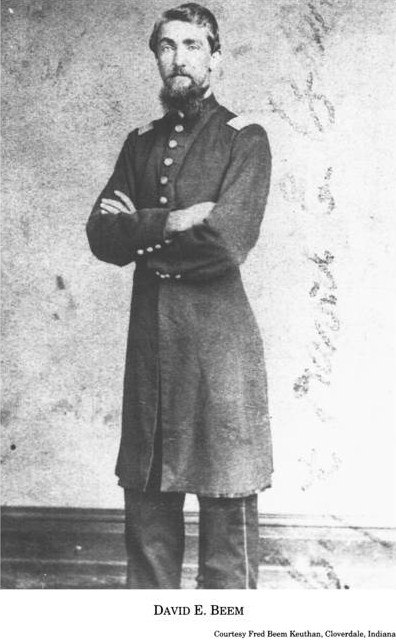
- Born: June 24, 1837; Spencer, Indiana, US
- Died: October 23, 1923 (aged 86); Spencer, Indiana, US
- Education: Indiana University, 1860
- Occupations: Lawyer, banker, soldier
- Political party: Republican
- Spouse: Mahala Joslin (m. 1862)

David Enoch Beem (June 24, 1837 – October 23, 1923) was a prominent lawyer, banker, and American Civil War veteran from Spencer, Owen County, Indiana. Beem, who attained the rank of captain of Company H, 14th Indiana Infantry Regiment, fought in numerous battles in the eastern United States before he mustered out of the Union army in June 1864. After the war Beem resumed his law practice in Spencer and became involved in local banking ventures. He was also active the state's Republican Party and civic affairs. Beem, a graduate of Indiana University, class of 1860, served on Purdue University's board of trustees for eighteen years. He also participated in the Grand Army of the Republic at local and state levels. Beem's papers and letters are preserved in the collections of the Indiana Historical Society in Indianapolis. The David Enoch Beem House, his former residence in Spencer, is listed on the National Register of Historic Places.

== Early life and education ==
David Enoch Beem, the son of Levi and Sarah (Johnson) Beem, was born on June 24, 1837, in Spencer, Indiana. Levi Beem, a farmer and a native of Kentucky, came to the Indiana Territory as a boy around 1810. David's grandparents, Daniel and Mary Beem, settled their family in Owen County on land that became the present-day site of Spencer, Indiana. Sarah Beem was the daughter of David Johnson, another early settler who came to Spencer in 1818. Levi Beem and Sarah Johnson were married in Spencer in 1825. David, was the sixth of the family's twelve children, two of whom died in infancy.

Beem completed his early education in Spencer. In 1856 he entered Indiana University at Bloomington, Indiana where he became a member of Phi Delta Theta fraternity and graduated with a degree in law in 1860.

== Marriage and family ==
Beem married Mahala Joslin on April 10, 1862, while home on leave during the American Civil War. She was a daughter of Amasa Joslin, a physician who came to Owen County in 1820, and Mary Ann (Allison) Joslin. David and Mahala Beem had three children: a daughter, Minnie Montrose, and two sons, David Joslin and Levi Amasa.

The David Enoch Beem House, an Italianate-style residence on a 10-acre (4.0-hectare) hilltop property in Spencer, was also known as the "Beem Mansion" and "The Hill." Built in 1874, it was added to the National Register of Historic Places in 1989.

== Career ==
In 1860 Beem established a law practice in his hometown of Spencer, Indiana, where he was also involved in banking ventures. Beem also served for three years as an officer in the 14th Indiana Volunteer Regiment during the American Civil War. In addition to his law practice and business interests, Beem was active in the Grand Army of the Republic and Republican Party at the state and local levels and served on Purdue University's board of trustees.

=== Early career ===
Beem was admitted to the bar in 1860 and established a law partnership in Spencer, Indiana, with Samuel H. Buskirk of Bloomington. The following year he began three years of military service as an officer in the Union army.

=== Military service ===
In response to a call for troops to serve in the Union army, Beem was the first man to enlist from Owen County and helped raise the county's first company of troops. He enlisted on April 19, 1861, as a first sergeant. Beem served in the 14th Indiana Volunteer Regiment, which initially organized for one year of service; however, it was reorganized for a three years of service in May 1861. Beem and his Spencer County company mustered into service as Company H, 14th Indiana Volunteer Regiment, on June 7, 1861, at Camp Vigo, near Terre Haute, Indiana, under the command of Colonel Nathan Kimball.

On July 10, 1861, the 14th Indiana arrived at Rich Mountain in Virginia and served as a reserve force in the Battle of Rich Mountain the following day. The 14th Indiana also pursued Confederate troops as far as Cheat Mountain. Beem was promoted to first lieutenant of his company in August 1861. During the winter of 1861–62, the regiment was transferred to the Shenandoah Valley. On March 23, 1862, Beem was severely wounded in the chin during the first Battle of Kernstown, near Winchester, Virginia. He returned to active duty with the 14th Indiana following a sixty-day leave of absence. Beem was promoted to captain in May 1862.

From July 1862 until June 1864, Beem and his regiment fought in battles at Antietam, Fredericksburg, Chancellorsville, and Gettysburg, Spottsylvania, and Cold Harbor, as well as other campaigns as part of the Union's Army of the Potomac. In August 1863 the 14th Indiana was detached for duty in New York following the New York City draft riots and remained in New York City until September 6, 1863. Beem and the other men of the 14th Indiana who had served three years of service mustered out of service on June 20, 1864 (backdated to June 6, 1864). Beem returned home to Spencer.

=== Post-war career ===
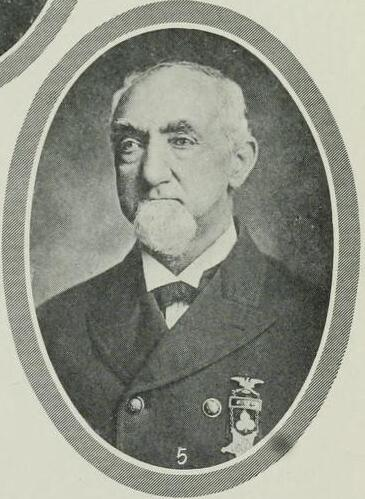
Beem in a 1914 publication

After the war, Been resumed his legal career in Spencer as a partner in the firm of Rose and Beem. The firm later dissolved, but Beem continued to practice law in Owen, Green, and Clay counties. In addition, Beem organized the First National Bank of Spencer and became its cashier and acting manager. In 1870 he organized Beem, Peden and Company, a banking firm in Spencer, and managed the business for thirty-nine years. Not all of his business ventures were as successful. Beem and others established a pork-packing operation in Spencer in 1873 that failed. In 1878 Beem formed another law partnership in Spencer named Beem and Hickham. The firm continued for fifteen years before the partnership was dissolved. Afterwards, Beem continued to practice law and remained active in banking.

Beem was also active in the Republican Party, but never held public office. Instead, he served as chairman of the Owen County Republican Central Committee during three political campaigns. In 1880 Beem was a delegate from the Fifth Congressional District to the Republican National Convention in Chicago, where James A. Garfield was eventually nominated as the party's presidential candidate. In 1886 Beem was a candidate for state treasurer at the Republican state convention, but he did not win his party's nomination. Beem served as a presidential elector for his Congressional District in 1888 and voted for Benjamin Harrison in the electoral college.

In 1893 Beem formed a law partnership with Joseph W. Williams of Owen County and remained active in community affairs. Been served on the board of trustees of Spencer's public schools for several years and was a member of the Masons. He joined the Methodist Episcopal Church in 1860 and represented the Indiana Conference as a delegate to the Methodist Episcopal Church's conference in New York in 1888. Beem also served for eighteen years on Purdue University's board of trustees. In addition, he held leadership roles in the state and local chapters of the Grand Army of the Republic. Beem was a charter member and the first commander of the GAR's Gettysburg Post at Spencer. In 1894 Beem served as a judge advocate for the GAR's Department of Indiana.

== Death and legacy ==
Beem died after an extended illness in Spencer, Indiana, on October 23, 1923, at the age of eighty-six.

A collection of letters that Beem exchanged with his wife, and other family members and friends are preserved at the Indiana Historical Society in Indianapolis. Many of the letters provide details of Beem's military service in the 14th Indiana Volunteer Regiment.

== Honors and tributes ==
"You Are There 1863: A Letter Home from Gettysburg," an exhibit from September 23, 2017, through January 19, 2019, at the Eugene and Marilyn Glick Indiana History Center in downtown Indianapolis, focuses on a letter that Beem wrote on July 5, 1863, a few days after he fought in the Battle of Gettysburg. The letter describes Beem's eyewitness account of the battle and its aftermath.

== Published works ==
- Daniel Beem and His Descentants. Spencer, Indiana: Owenn County Historical and Genealogical Society. 1997. OCLC 37848714.
- "Military History of Owen County," in Charles Blanchard, ed. (1884). Counties of Clay and Owen, Indiana: Historical and Biographical. Indianapolis: F. A. Battey and Company. pp. 617–22.
