= Secrest-Wampler House =

Historic house in Indiana, United States

- U.S. National Register of Historic Places
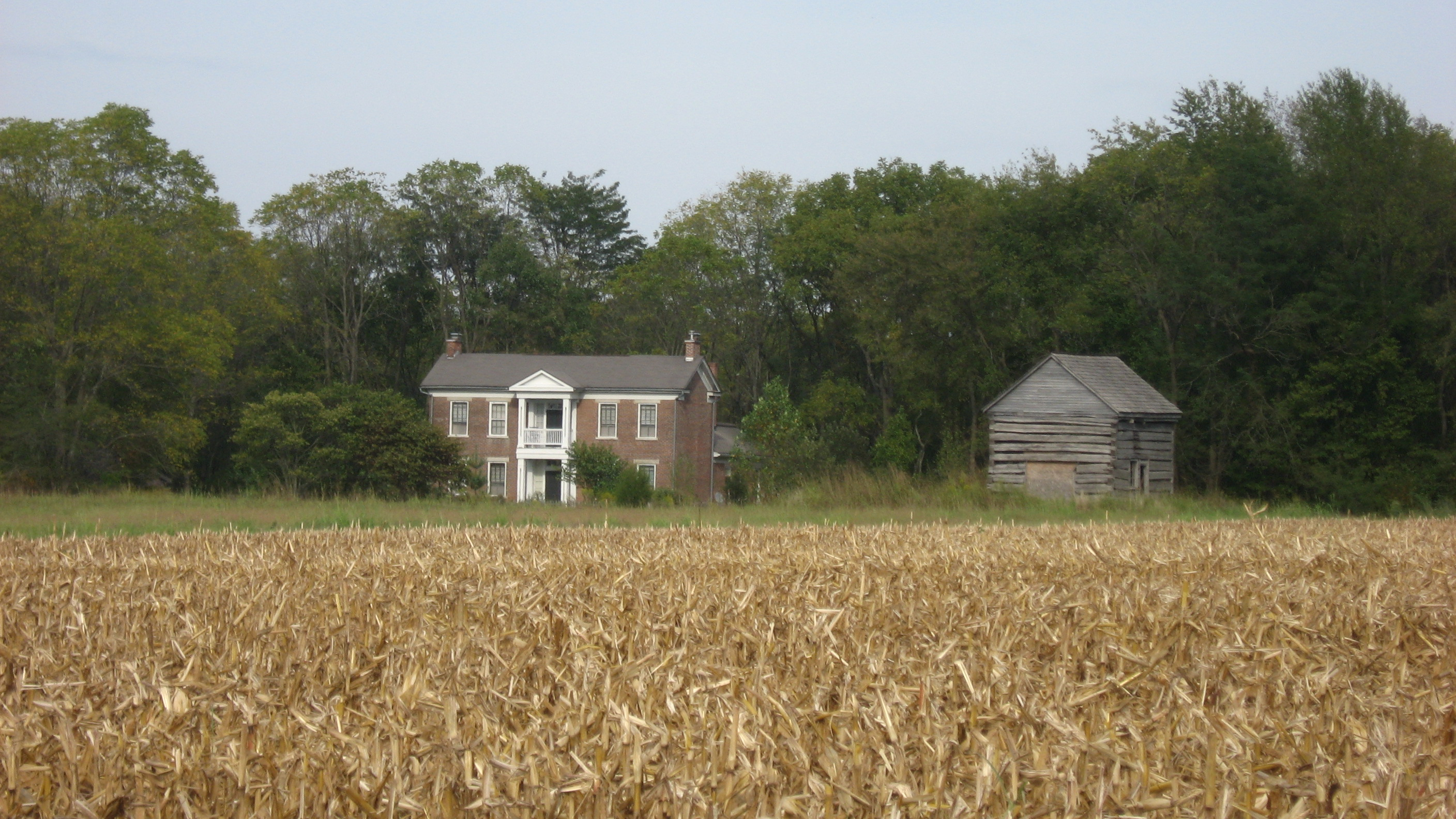
- Secrest-Wampler House, September 2010

- Location within Indiana Location within the United States
- Location: 1816 Concord Rd., southwest of Gosport in Washington Township, Owen County, Indiana
- Coordinates: 39°18′59″N 86°42′06″W
- Area: 10 acres (4.0 ha)
- Built: 1859
- Architectural style: Greek Revival, I-House
- NRHP reference No.: 02000199
- Added to NRHP: March 20, 2002

Secrest-Wampler House, also known as the James Secrest House, is a historic home located in Washington Township, Owen County, Indiana. It was built in 1859, and is a two-story, brick I-house with Greek Revival style design elements. It has a one-story rear ell, and the front facade features a two-story portico. The house was restored in the 1990s.

It was listed on the National Register of Historic Places in 2002.
