= Stone Arch Bridge over McCormick's Creek =

- U.S. National Register of Historic Places
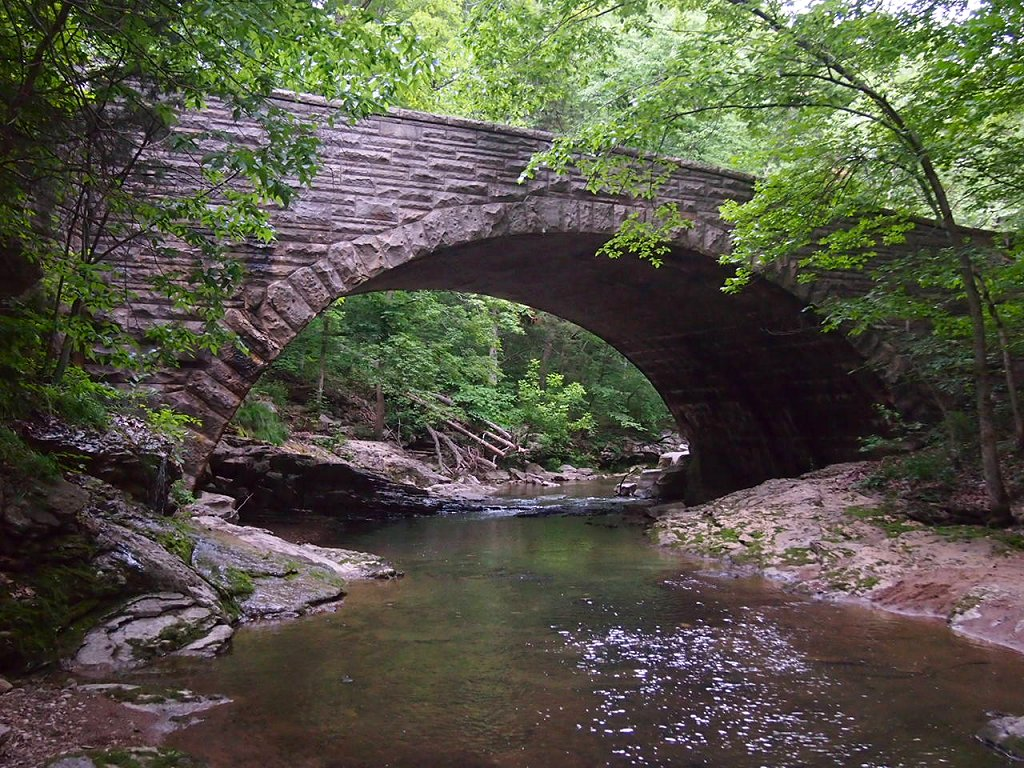
- McCormick's Creek Bridge, June 2013

- Location within Indiana Location within the United States
- Location: McCormick's Creek State Park, west of the junction of State Roads 43 and 46, and east of Spencer in Washington Township, Owen County, Indiana
- Coordinates: 39°17′25″N 86°43′1″W
- Area: less than 1 acre (0.40 ha)
- Built: 1934
- Built by: Civilian Conservation Corps
- Architectural style: Park Rustic
- MPS: New Deal Resources in Indiana State Parks MPS
- NRHP reference No.: 93000177
- Added to NRHP: March 18, 1993

Stone Arch Bridge over McCormick's Creek is a historic arch bridge located at McCormick's Creek State Park in Washington Township, Owen County, Indiana. It was built by the Civilian Conservation Corps in 1934, and is solidly constructed of mortared roughcut limestone. The round arch has a 54-foot (16 m) span and reaches approximately 25 feet (7.6 m) high.

It was listed on the National Register of Historic Places in 1993.
