= Spencer Town Hall and Fire Station =

- U.S. National Register of Historic Places
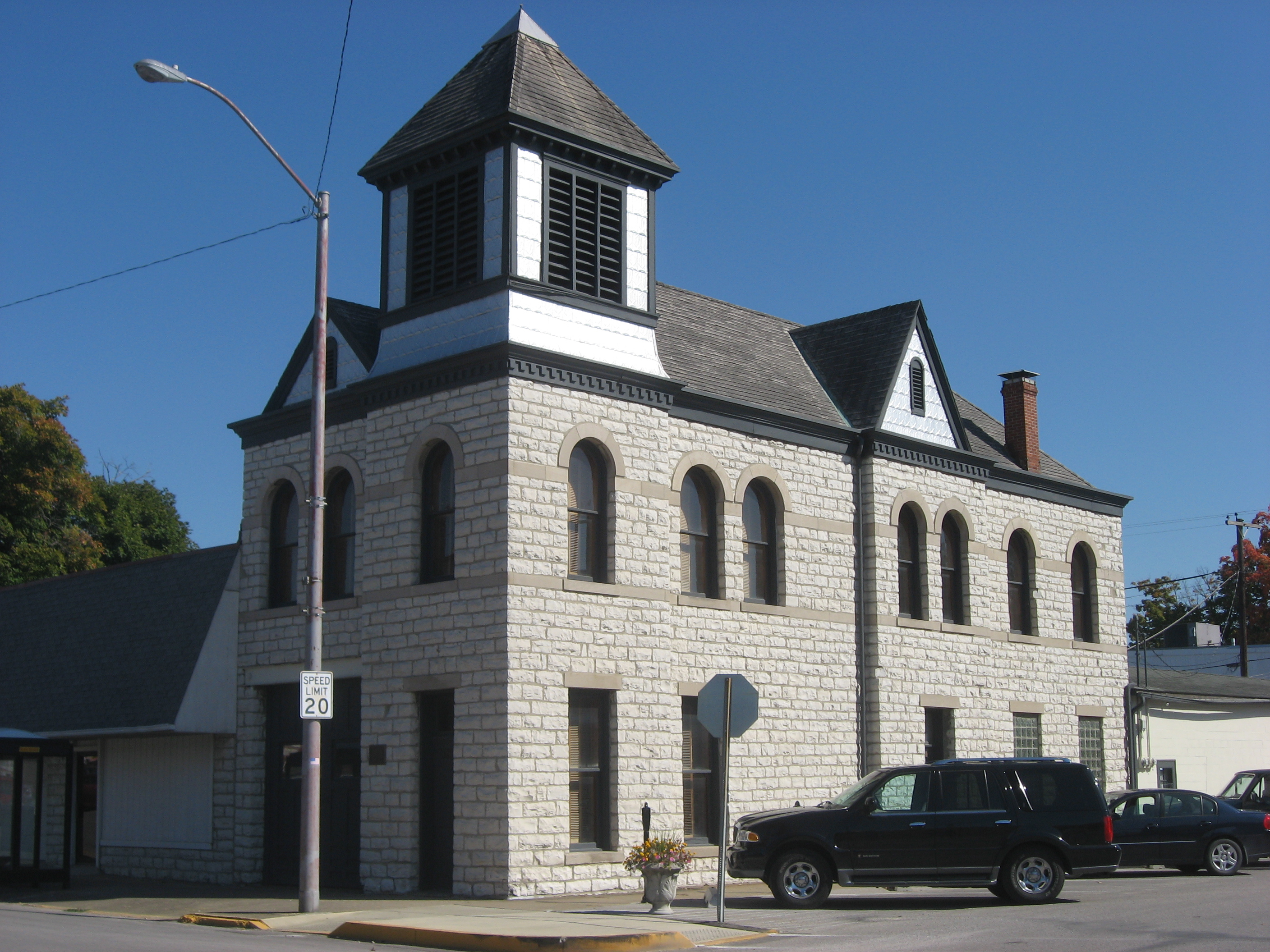
- Spencer Town Hall and Fire Station, October 2010

- Location within Indiana Location within the United States
- Location: 84 S. Washington St., Spencer, Indiana
- Coordinates: 39°17′7″N 86°45′40″W
- Area: less than one acre
- Built: 1897-1898
- Architect: Repath & Pickens
- Architectural style: Romanesque, Romanesque Revival
- NRHP reference No.: 82000027
- Added to NRHP: August 19, 1982

Spencer Town Hall and Fire Station is a historic town hall and fire station located at Spencer, Indiana. It was built in 1897–1898, and is a two-story, rectangular, Romanesque Revival style limestone building with a corner bell tower. It measures 24 feet wide and 61 feet long and has a hipped roof. The building was used for municipal purposes until 1975. In 2005, the building housed law offices.

It was listed on the National Register of Historic Places in 1982.
