= Gosport station (Indiana) =

- New Albany and Salem Railroad Station
- Formerly listed on the U.S. National Register of Historic Places
- Location within Indiana Location within the United States
- Location: North St. at White River, Gosport, Indiana
- Area: 3.5 acres (1.4 ha)
- Built: 1854-1858
- NRHP reference No.: 76000015

Significant dates
- Added to NRHP: August 6, 1976
- Removed from NRHP: October 13, 1983

New Albany and Salem Railroad Station, also known as the Louisville and Nashville (Monon) Railroad Station, was a historic train station located at Gosport, Owen County, Indiana. It was built between 1854 and 1858 by the New Albany and Salem Railroad. It was a one-story, simple brick structure measuring 58 feet wide by 123 feet long. It has been demolished.

It was listed on the National Register of Historic Places in 1976 and delisted in 1983.

Preceding station	Monon Railroad	Following station
Quincy toward Chicago	Main Line	Stinesville toward Louisville
