= Mount Tabor, Indiana =

- Unincorporated community
- Location within Indiana Location within the United States
- Coordinates: 39°18′41″N 86°38′00″W
- Country: United States
- State: Indiana
- County: Monroe
- Township: Bean Blossom
- Elevation: 581 ft (177 m)
- Time zone: UTC-5 (Eastern (EST))
  - Summer (DST): UTC-4 (EDT)
- ZIP code: 47429
- Area codes: 812, 930
- FIPS code: 18-51725
- GNIS feature ID: 439704

Mount Tabor is an unincorporated community in Bean Blossom Township, Monroe County, in the U.S. state of Indiana.

== History ==
Mount Tabor was platted in 1828. The community was named directly or indirectly after Mount Tabor, in the Middle East. A post office was established at Mount Tabor in 1831, and remained in operation until it was discontinued in 1860.
