= Moffett-Ralston House =

Historic house in Indiana, United States

- U.S. National Register of Historic Places
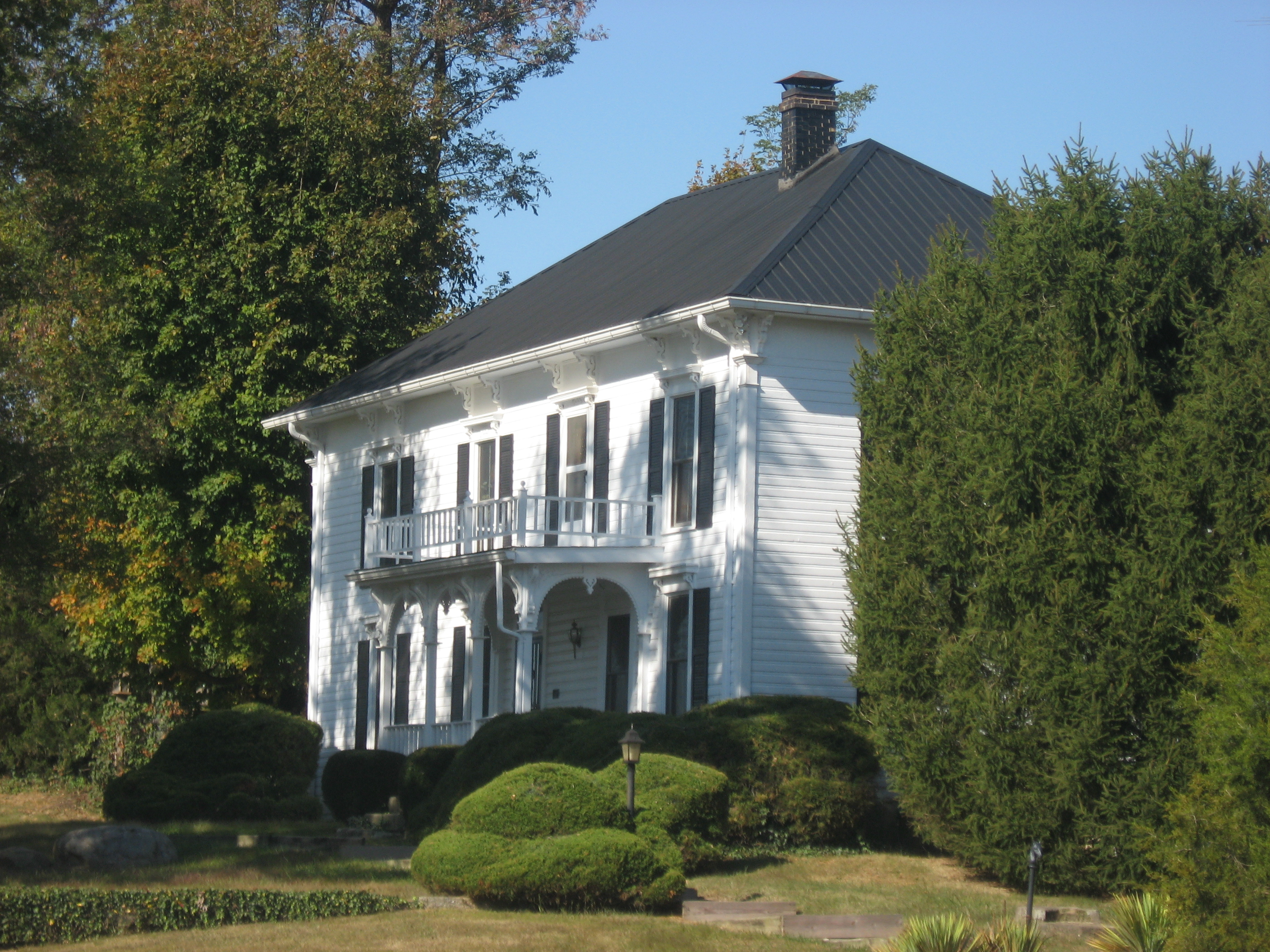
- Moffett-Ralston House, October 2010

- Location within Indiana Location within the United States
- Location: 1.5 miles northeast of Patricksburg on Bixler Rd., Lafayette Township, Owen County, Indiana
- Coordinates: 39°19′28″N 86°55′26″W
- Area: 3 acres (1.2 ha)
- Built: 1864, c. 1870
- Architectural style: Greek Revival, Italian Villa
- NRHP reference No.: 75000010
- Added to NRHP: May 12, 1975

Moffett-Ralston House, also known as the John C. Robinson House, is a historic home located in Lafayette Township, Owen County, Indiana. It was built in 1864, and expanded and modified about 1870. It is a two-story, vernacular Greek Revival / Italian Villa style frame dwelling. It has a hipped roof with brackets and a rebuilt ornate porch with balustrade. It was renovated in the early-1970s. It was a boyhood home of Governor and Senator Samuel M. Ralston.

It was listed on the National Register of Historic Places in 1975.
