= David Enoch Beem House =

Historic house in Indiana, United States

- U.S. National Register of Historic Places
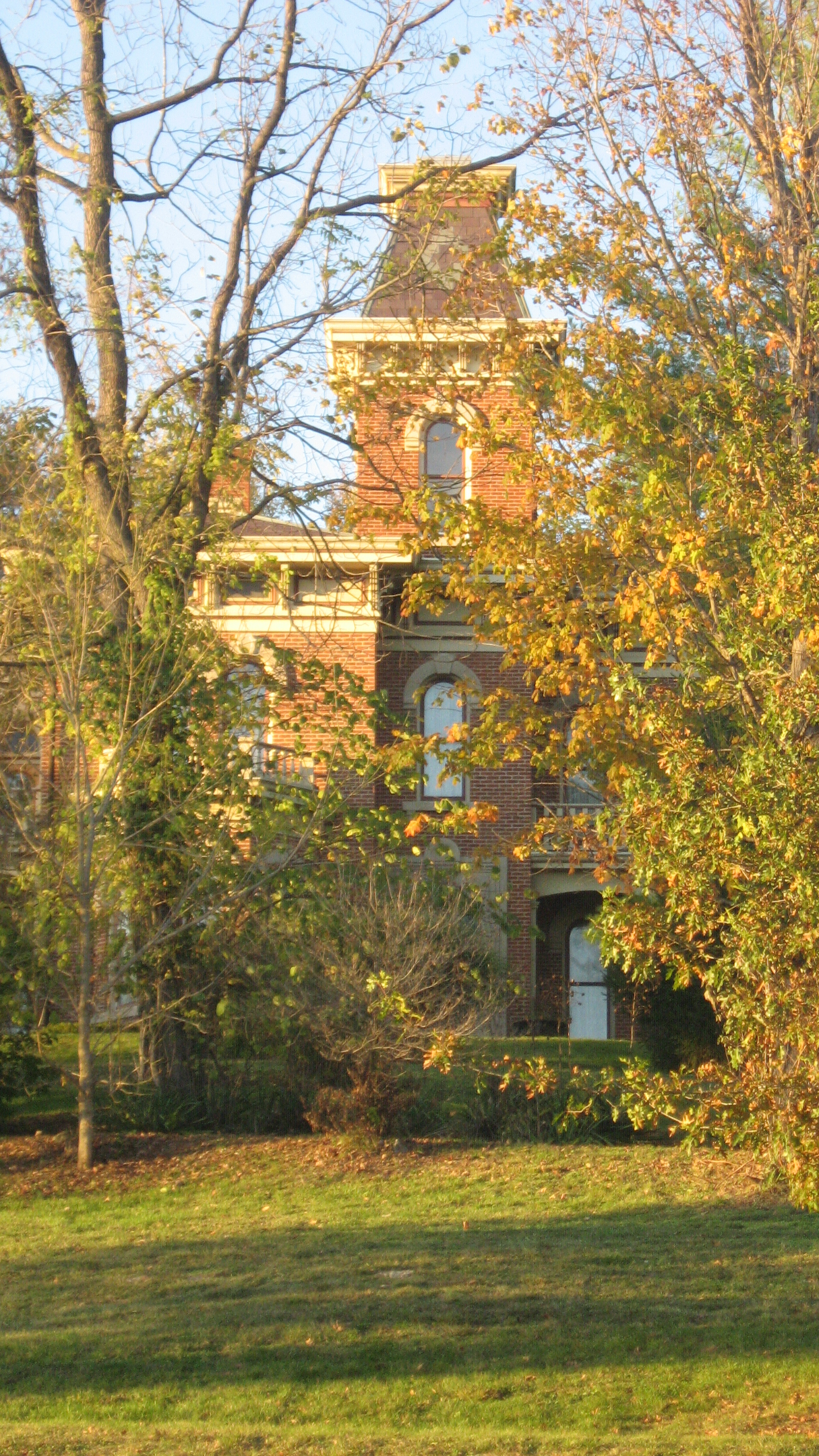
- David Enoch Beem House, October 2010

- Location within Indiana Location within the United States
- Location: 635 W. Hillside Ave., Spencer, Indiana
- Coordinates: 39°17′25″N 86°46′9″W
- Area: 6 acres (2.4 ha)
- Built: 1874
- Architectural style: Italianate
- NRHP reference No.: 89000771
- Added to NRHP: July 13, 1989

David Enoch Beem House, also known as the "Beem Mansion," is a historic home located in Spencer, Indiana. Built in 1874, the large, two-story, Italianate-style residence is named after its original owner, David Enoch Beem, a local lawyer and banker, and his family. The T-plan, brick dwelling rests on a rusticated Indiana limestone foundation and arched openings framed in limestone. It features a three-story, central tower at the entrance with a steeply pitched mansard roof. The home was listed on the National Register of Historic Places in 1989.
