= Washington Township, Owen County, Indiana =

Washington Township
- Township
- Location in Owen County
- Coordinates: 39°17′35″N 86°45′25″W
- Country: United States
- State: Indiana
- County: Owen

Government
  - Type: Indiana township

Area
  - Total: 47.57 sq mi (123.2 km^{2})
  - Land: 47.4 sq mi (123 km^{2})
  - Water: 0.17 sq mi (0.44 km^{2}) 0.36%
- Elevation: 630 ft (192 m)

Population (2020)
  - Total: 6,387
  - Density: 135/sq mi (52.0/km^{2})
- ZIP codes: 47431, 47433, 47460
- GNIS feature ID: 454011

Washington Township is one of thirteen townships in Owen County, Indiana, United States. As of the 2020 census, its population was 6,387 (up from 6,164 at 2010) and it contained 2,616 housing units.

== History ==
Washington Township was organized in 1819. It was named for George Washington.

The CCC Recreation Building-Nature Museum, McCormick's Creek State Park Entrance and Gatehouse, Secrest-Wampler House, and Stone Arch Bridge over McCormick's Creek are listed on the National Register of Historic Places.

== Geography ==
According to the 2010 census, the township has a total area of 47.57 square miles (123.2 km^{2}), of which 47.4 square miles (123 km^{2}) (or 99.64%) is land and 0.17 square miles (0.44 km^{2}) (or 0.36%) is water. The White River defines the northeastern border of the township.

=== Cities, towns, villages ===
- Spencer

=== Unincorporated towns ===
- Highets Corner at 39.28199°N 86.704171°W
- Romona at 39.327268°N 86.730005°W
- Southport at 39.276989°N 86.761673°W

(This list is based on USGS data and may include former settlements.)

=== Cemeteries ===
The township contains these seven cemeteries: Blair, Chambersville, Mount Moriah, River Hill, Riverside, Rose and Witham.

=== Major highways ===
- U.S. Route 231
- Indiana State Road 46
- Indiana State Road 67

=== Airports and landing strips ===
- Miller Airport

== School districts ==
- Spencer-Owen Community Schools

== Political districts ==
- State House District 46
- State Senate District 37
