= Lafayette Township, Owen County, Indiana =

Lafayette Township
- Township
- Location in Owen County
- Coordinates: 39°17′29″N 86°53′07″W
- Country: United States
- State: Indiana
- County: Owen

Government
  - Type: Indiana township

Area
  - Total: 29.12 sq mi (75.4 km^{2})
  - Land: 29.07 sq mi (75.3 km^{2})
  - Water: 0.05 sq mi (0.13 km^{2}) 0.17%
- Elevation: 643 ft (196 m)

Population (2020)
  - Total: 1,168
  - Density: 40.18/sq mi (15.51/km^{2})
- ZIP codes: 47431, 47460, 47833, 47868
- GNIS feature ID: 453533

Lafayette Township is one of thirteen townships in Owen County, Indiana, United States. As of the 2020 census, its population was 1,168 (down from 1,207 at 2010) and it contained 562 housing units.

== History ==
Lafayette Township was organized in 1839.

Moffett-Ralston House was listed on the National Register of Historic Places in 1975.

== Geography ==
According to the 2010 census, the township has a total area of 29.12 square miles (75.4 km^{2}), of which 29.07 square miles (75.3 km^{2}) (or 99.83%) is land and 0.05 square miles (0.13 km^{2}) (or 0.17%) is water.

=== Unincorporated towns ===
- Vandalia at 39.312544°N 86.866119°W

=== Cemeteries ===
The township contains these seven cemeteries: Fender, Galimore, Palestine, Saint Walley, Splinter Ridge, Tipton and Wright.

=== Major highways ===
- Indiana State Road 46

== School districts ==
- Spencer-Owen Community Schools

== Political districts ==
- State House District 46
- State Senate District 37
- State Senate District 39
