= Spencer Public Library =

- U.S. National Register of Historic Places
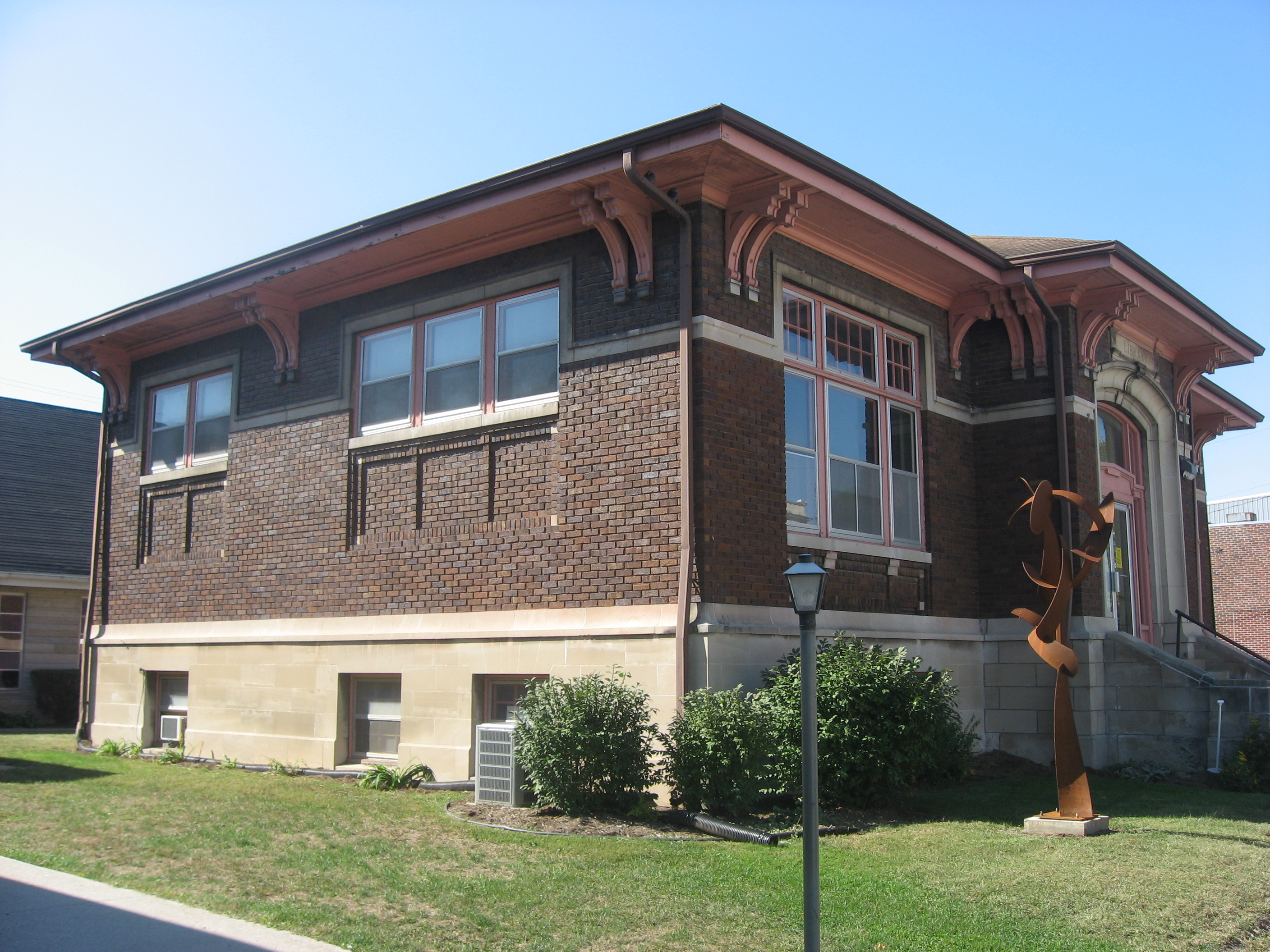
- Spencer Public Library, October 2010

- Location within Indiana Location within the United States
- Location: 110 E. Market St., Spencer, Indiana
- Coordinates: 39°17′5″N 86°45′38″W
- Area: less than one acre
- Built: 1912
- Built by: Kemmer, A.E.
- Architect: Parker, Wilson B.
- Architectural style: Bungalow/craftsman
- NRHP reference No.: 07000980
- Added to NRHP: September 20, 2007

The old Spencer Public Library is a former public library and historic Carnegie library located at Spencer, Indiana. It was built in 1912, and is a one-story, three-bay, American Craftsman style brick building on a raised basement. It has a low-pitched hipped roof and projecting entry bay. It was constructed with a $10,000 grant provided by the Carnegie Foundation.

The building ceased its function as a public library in 1997. The Owen County Heritage & Culture Center occupies the space today. Currently, Owen County Public Library operates the only library branch in Owen County at 10 S. Montgomery St. in Spencer

The building was listed on the National Register of Historic Places in 2007.
