= Gosport Historic District =

Historic district in Indiana, United States

- U.S. National Register of Historic Places
- U.S. Historic district
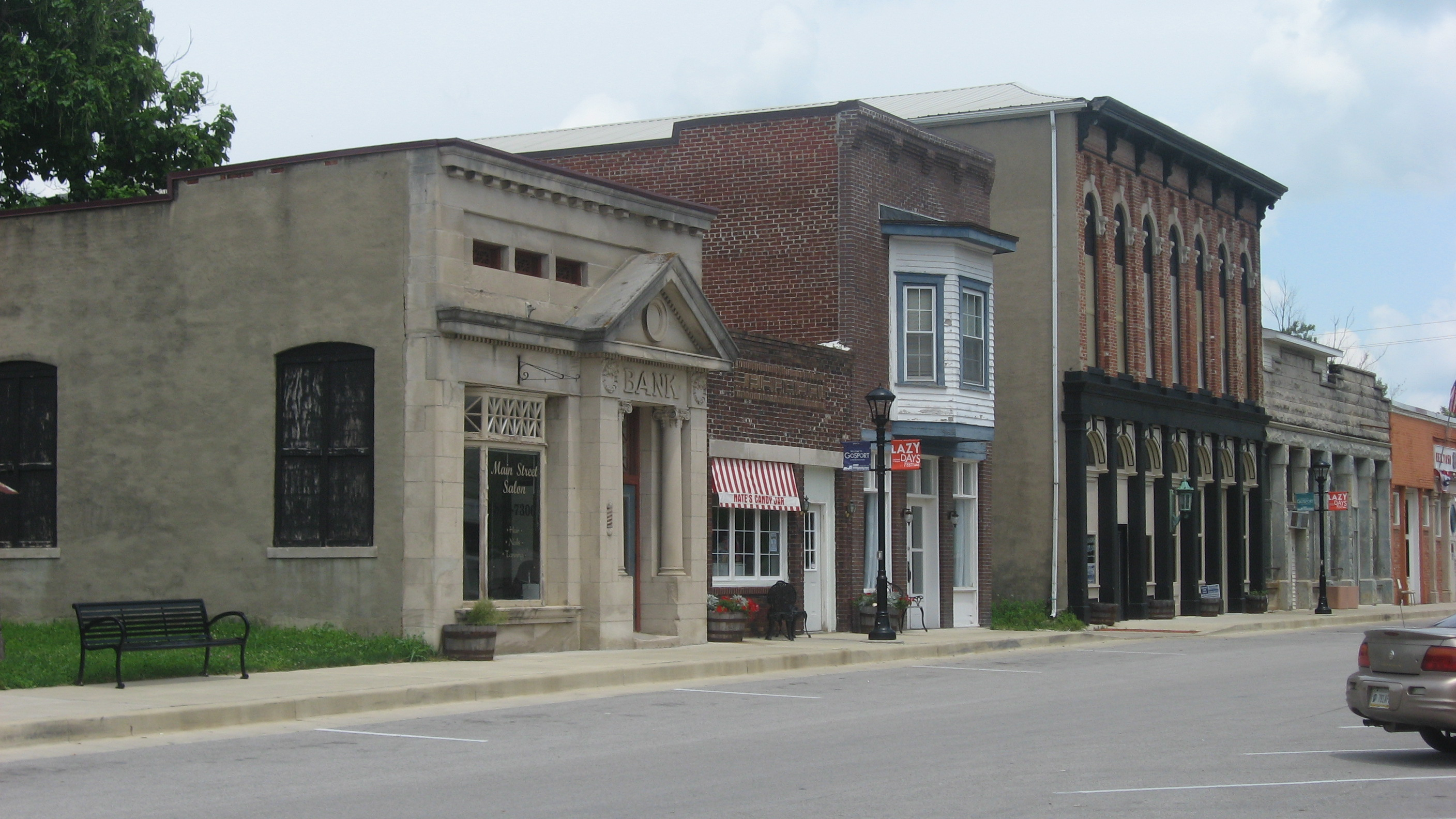
- Gosport Historic District, July 2013

- Location within Indiana Location within the United States
- Location: Roughly bounded by Church, Walnut, 5th, and 3rd Sts., Gosport, Indiana
- Coordinates: 39°20′57″N 86°39′48″W
- Area: 11.33 acres (4.59 ha)
- Architect: Carter, George; Cramer, Ira; Cramer, Julian
- Architectural style: Italianate, Classical Revival, Bungalow/craftsman
- NRHP reference No.: 13000425
- Added to NRHP: June 25, 2013

Gosport Historic District is a national historic district located at Gosport, Indiana. The district encompasses 40 contributing buildings, one contributing site, four contributing structures, and four contributing objects in the central business district and surrounding residential sections of Gosport. It developed between about 1835 and 1952, and includes notable examples of Italianate, Classical Revival, and Bungalow / American Craftsman style architecture. Located in the district is the separately listed Dr. H.G. Osgood House. Other notable contributing resources include the Bank of Gosport (1867, c. 1900), Gosport Banking Company (1909), Graham Building (1909), Knights of Pythias Building / Opera House (c. 1873), Gosport Town Park (1908, 1942), Gosport Tavern (1835), Gosport Masonic Lodge No. 92 (1923), and the Nazarene Church (1952).

It was listed on the National Register of Historic Places in 2013.
