= Dr. H. G. Osgood House =

Historic house in Indiana, United States

- U.S. National Register of Historic Places
- U.S. Historic district – Contributing property
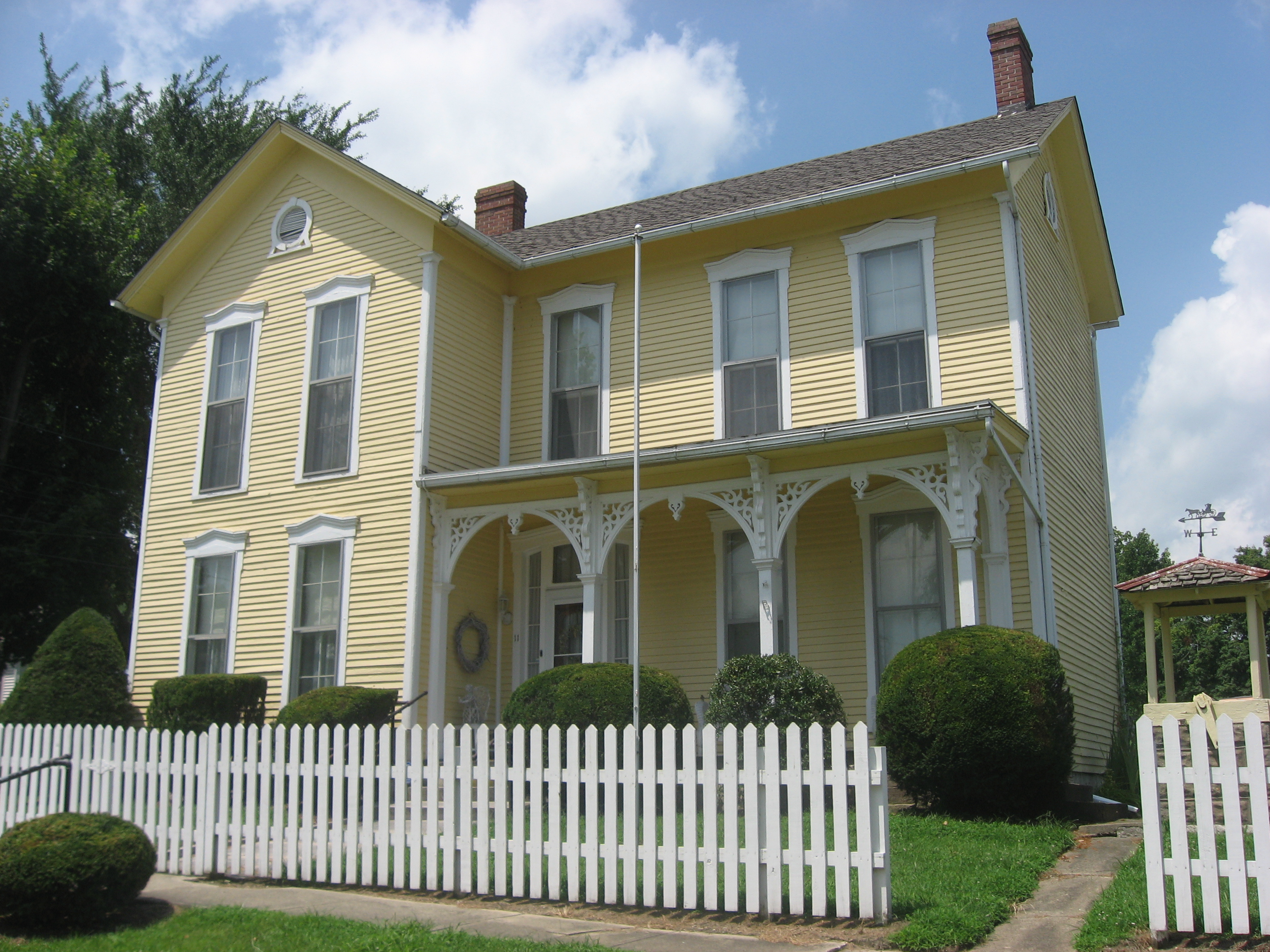
- Dr. H.G. Osgood House, July 2010

- Location within Indiana Location within the United States
- Location: 11 E. North St., Gosport, Indiana
- Coordinates: 39°21′1″N 86°39′56″W
- Area: 0.6 acres (0.24 ha)
- Built: c. 1850, c. 1860-1880
- Architectural style: Italianate, English barn
- NRHP reference No.: 99001075
- Added to NRHP: September 3, 1999

Dr. H. G. Osgood House, also known as the Mina Jane Ahlemeyer Property, is a historic home located at Gosport, Indiana. The main section of the house was built between about 1860 and 1880, and is a two-story, "T"-plan, Italianate style frame residence. It has the original two-story rear wing, built about 1850, and one-story wing. Also on the property are the contributing English barn / carriage barn and privy.

It was listed on the National Register of Historic Places in 1999. It is located in the Gosport Historic District.
