= Allison-Robinson House =

Historic house in Indiana, United States

- U.S. National Register of Historic Places
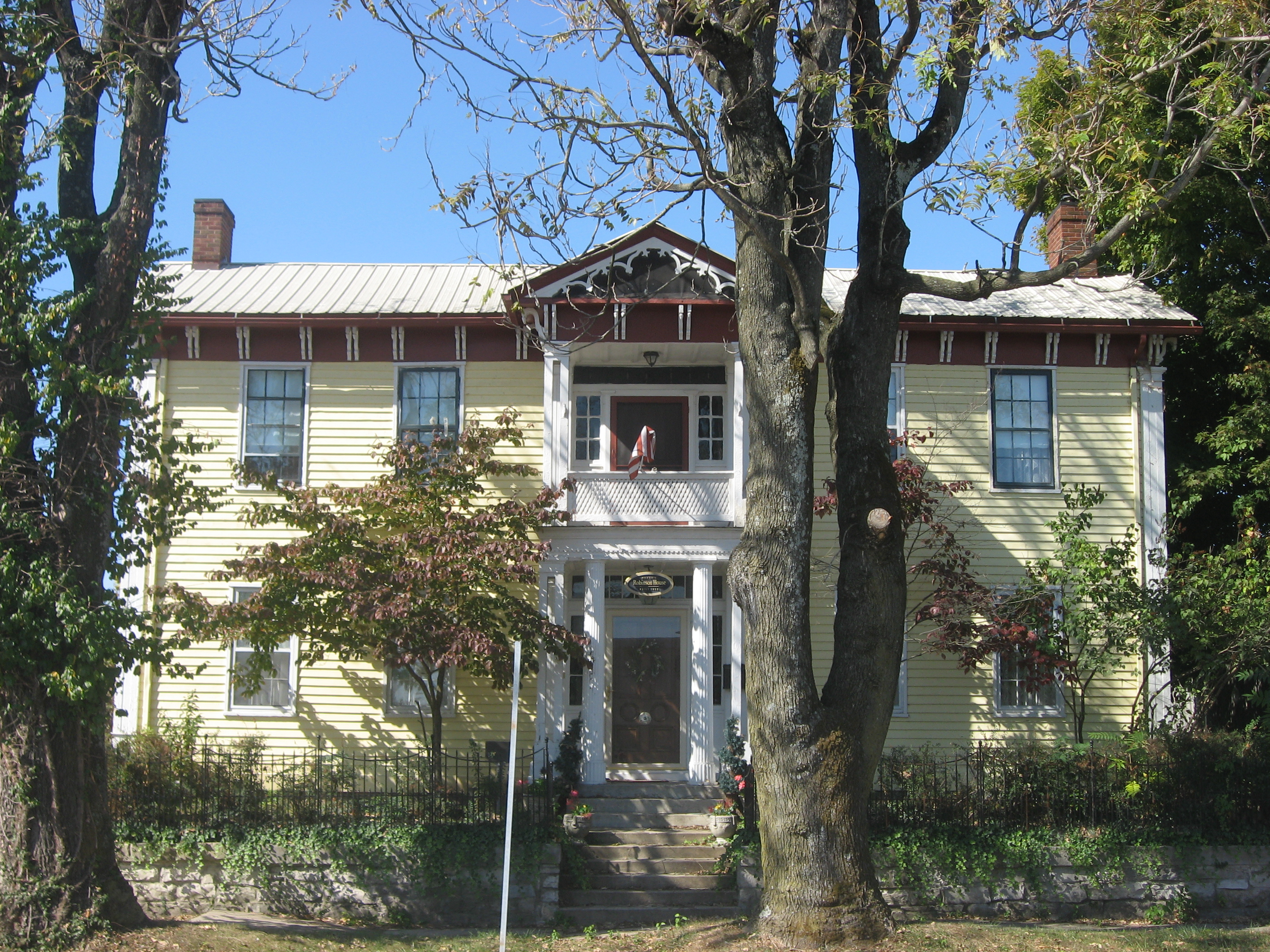
- Allison-Robinson House, October 2010

- Location within Indiana Location within the United States
- Location: 3 N. Montgomery St., Spencer, Indiana
- Coordinates: 39°17′11″N 86°45′49″W
- Area: less than one acre
- Built: c. 1855-1860
- Architectural style: Vernacular, I-house
- NRHP reference No.: 93000468
- Added to NRHP: June 3, 1993

Allison-Robinson House, also known as the John C. Robinson House, is a historic home located at Spencer, Indiana. It was built between about 1855 and 1860, and is a two-story, "L"-plan, frame vernacular Greek Revival style I-house. It has a central passage plan and medium pitched roof. The front facade features a central two-story, one-bay entrance portico with fluted Doric order columns. Also on the property is a contributing section of retaining wall.

It was listed on the National Register of Historic Places in 1993.
