= Wayne Township, Doniphan County, Kansas =

Wayne Township
- Township
- Location in Doniphan County
- Coordinates: 39°40′19″N 095°05′01″W
- Country: United States
- State: Kansas
- County: Doniphan
- Named for: Anthony Wayne

Area
  - Total: 35.88 sq mi (92.92 km^{2})
  - Land: 35.61 sq mi (92.24 km^{2})
  - Water: 0.26 sq mi (0.68 km^{2}) 0.73%
- Elevation: 978 ft (298 m)

Population (2020)
  - Total: 201
  - Density: 5.64/sq mi (2.18/km^{2})
- GNIS feature ID: 0473294

Wayne Township is a township in Doniphan County, Kansas, United States. As of the 2020 census, its population was 201.

== Geography ==
Wayne Township covers an area of 35.88 square miles (92.9 km^{2}) and contains no incorporated settlements. According to the USGS, it contains one cemetery, Doniphan.

The stream of Rock Creek runs through this township. It is also drained by Independence and Brush Creeks.

== History ==
Wayne Township was organized on September 1, 1855. It was named for General Anthony Wayne.
