= Wayne Township, Buchanan County, Missouri =

Township in Buchanan County, Missouri, U.S.

Wayne Township
- Township
- Coordinates: 39°39′32″N 94°56′02″W
- Country: United States
- State: Missouri
- County: Buchanan

Area
  - Total: 33.6 sq mi (87 km^{2})
  - Land: 32.91 sq mi (85.2 km^{2})
  - Water: 0.69 sq mi (1.8 km^{2}) 2.05%
- Elevation: 807 ft (246 m)

Population (2020)
  - Total: 652
  - Density: 19.8/sq mi (7.6/km^{2})
- FIPS code: 29-02177974
- GNIS feature ID: 766347

Wayne Township is a township in Buchanan County, Missouri, United States. At the 2020 census, its population was 652.

Wayne Township was established in 1842.

== Geography ==
Old Mud Lake in Buchanan County

Wayne Township covers an area of 33.96 square miles (88.0 km^{2}) and contains no incorporated settlements. It contains two cemeteries: Bethel and Kerlin.

Horseshoe Lake, Muskrat Lake, New Mud Lake and Old Mud Lake are within this township. The stream of Contrary Creek runs through this township.

== Transportation ==
The following highways travel through the township:

- U.S. Route 59
- Route JJ
- Route KK
- Route U
