= Wayne Township, Edwards County, Kansas =

Wayne Township
- Township
- Location in Edwards County
- Coordinates: 37°57′23″N 099°15′32″W
- Country: United States
- State: Kansas
- County: Edwards

Area
  - Total: 50.87 sq mi (131.75 km^{2})
  - Land: 50.87 sq mi (131.75 km^{2})
  - Water: 0 sq mi (0 km^{2}) 0%
- Elevation: 2,139 ft (652 m)

Population (2020)
  - Total: 493
  - Density: 9.69/sq mi (3.74/km^{2})
- GNIS feature ID: 0473550

Wayne Township is a township in Edwards County, Kansas, United States. As of the 2020 census, its population was 493.

== Geography ==
Wayne Township covers an area of 50.87 square miles (131.8 km^{2}) and contains one incorporated settlement, Lewis. According to the USGS, it contains one cemetery, Wayne.

== Transportation ==
Wayne Township contains two airports or landing strips: Cross Landing Strip and Fox Landing Strip.
