= Wayne Township, Owen County, Indiana =

Wayne Township
- Township
- Location in Owen County
- Coordinates: 39°22′37″N 86°40′29″W
- Country: United States
- State: Indiana
- County: Owen

Government
  - Type: Indiana township

Area
  - Total: 22.14 sq mi (57.3 km^{2})
  - Land: 22.11 sq mi (57.3 km^{2})
  - Water: 0.03 sq mi (0.078 km^{2}) 0.14%
- Elevation: 669 ft (204 m)

Population (2020)
  - Total: 1,704
  - Density: 77.07/sq mi (29.76/km^{2})
- ZIP codes: 47433, 47460
- GNIS feature ID: 454038

Wayne Township is one of thirteen townships in Owen County, Indiana, United States. As of the 2020 census, its population was 1,704 (representing no change from 2010) and it contained 800 housing units.

== History ==
Wayne Township was established in 1820. It was named for General Anthony Wayne.

Secrest Ferry Bridge was listed on the National Register of Historic Places in 1996.

== Geography ==
According to the 2010 census, the township has a total area of 22.14 square miles (57.3 km^{2}), of which 22.11 square miles (57.3 km^{2}) (or 99.86%) is land and 0.03 square miles (0.078 km^{2}) (or 0.14%) is water. The White River defines the township's southern border.

=== Cities, towns, villages ===
- Gosport

=== Unincorporated towns ===
(This list is based on USGS data and may include former settlements.)

=== Cemeteries ===
The township contains these three cemeteries: Gosport, Little Mount and Little Mount.

=== Major highways ===
- Indiana State Road 67

== School districts ==
- Spencer-Owen Community Schools

== Political districts ==
- State House District 46
- State Senate District 37
