= Owen County Courthouse (Indiana) =

- U.S. National Register of Historic Places
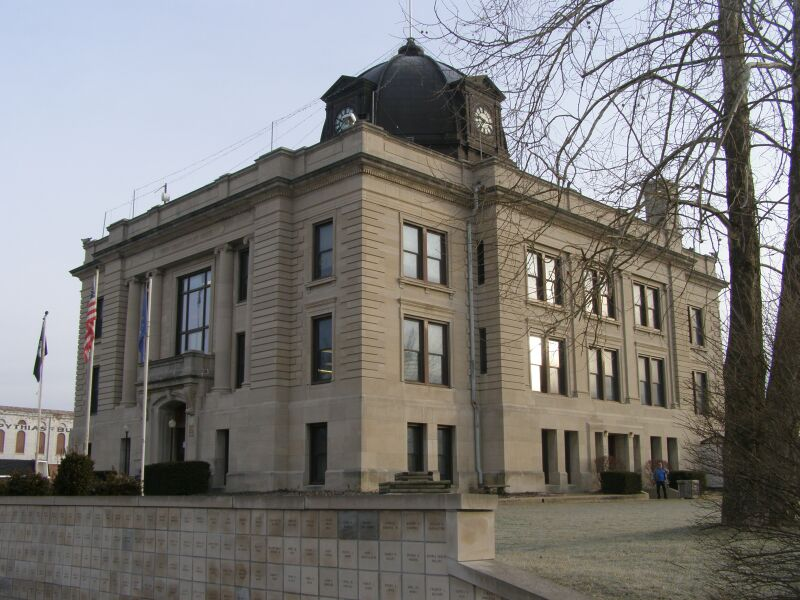
- Owen County Courthouse

- Location within Indiana Location within the United States
- Interactive map showing the location of Owen County Courthouse
- Location: Courthouse Sq., Spencer, Indiana
- Coordinates: 39°16′3″N 86°45′43″W
- Area: 1.5 acres (0.61 ha)
- Built: 1910-1911
- Architect: Jesse Townsend Johnson; Christian Kanzler & Son
- Architectural style: Classical Revival
- NRHP reference No.: 94001351
- Added to NRHP: November 25, 1994

The Owen County Courthouse is a historic courthouse located at Spencer, Indiana, United States. It was the work of Jesse Johnson and Christian Kanzler & Son and built in 1910–1911. It is a three-story, with basement, Classical Revival style limestone building. The flat roof is topped by a copper dome with four-sided Seth Thomas clock.

It was listed on the National Register of Historic Places in 1994.

In 2023, following the severe hail storm that damaged the copper dome, restoration efforts were initialized.

But the date was delayed further into late 2025 because simply the time required for insurance claims progress and funding caused the progress to delay.

The repairs were completed in October 2025.

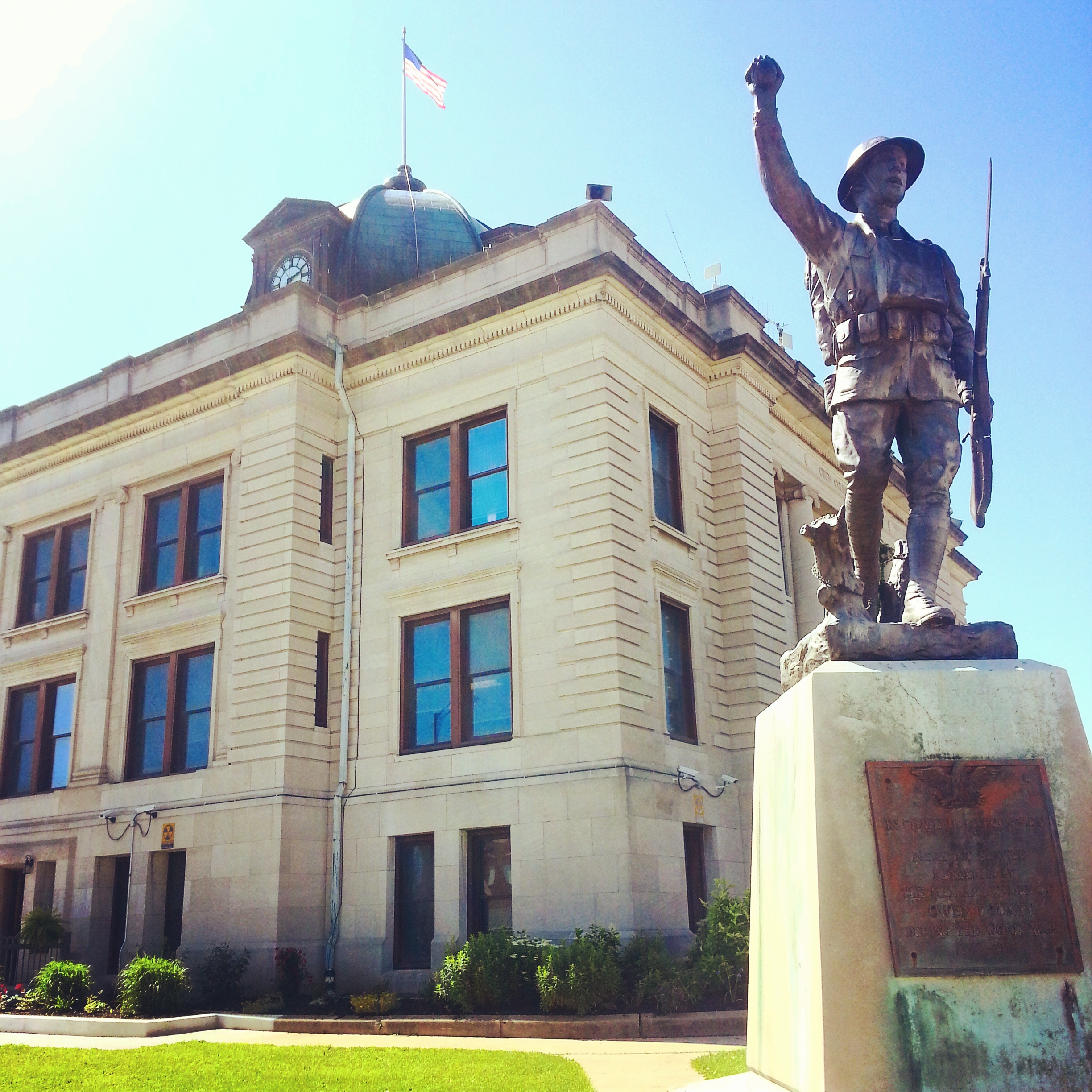
Owen County Courthouse with the Spirit of the American Doughboy
