= Gosport, Indiana =

- Town
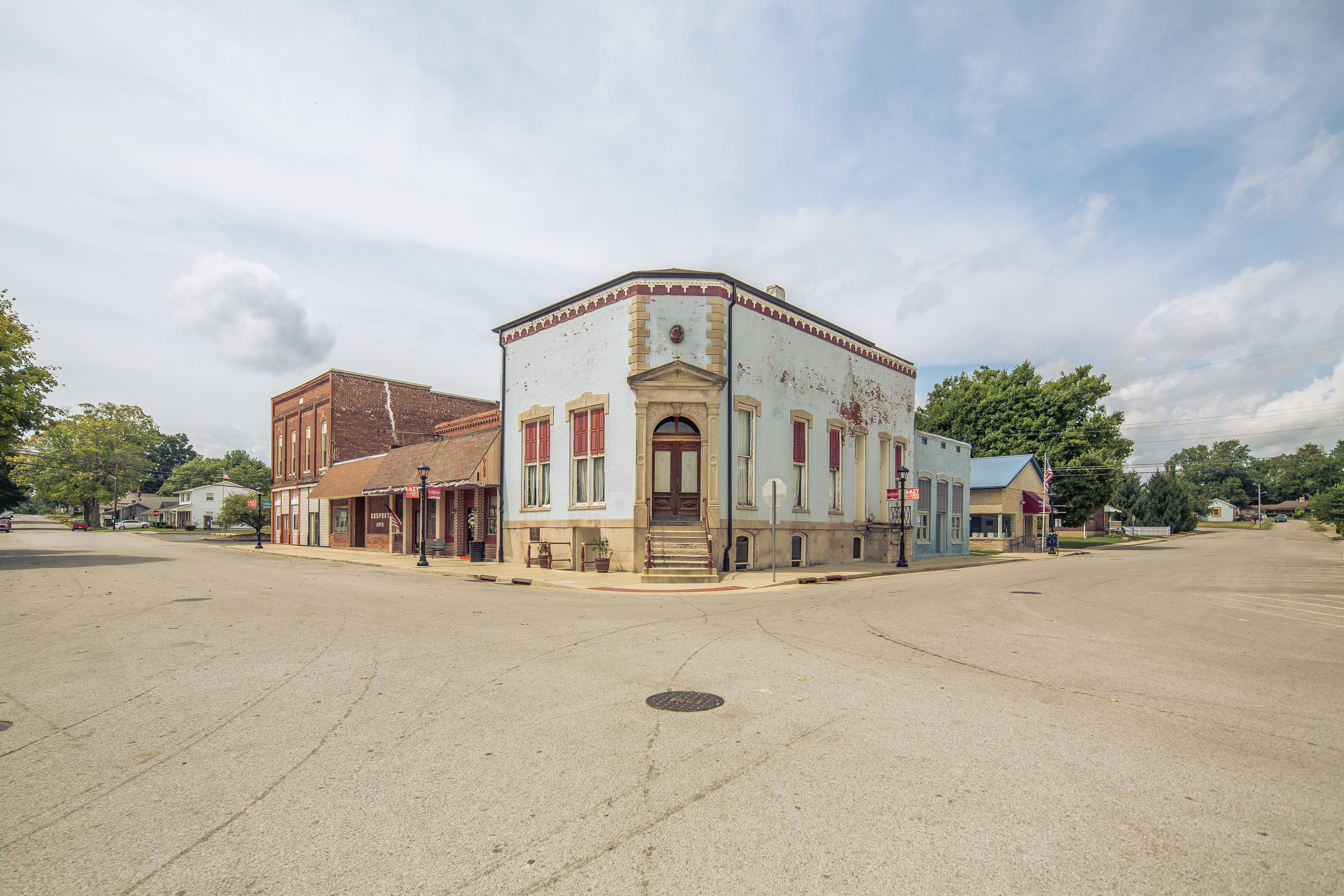

- Flag Logo

- Location of Gosport in Owen County, Indiana.
- Coordinates: 39°20′59″N 86°39′56″W
- Country: United States
- State: Indiana
- County: Owen
- Township: Wayne

Area
  - Total: 0.37 sq mi (0.97 km^{2})
  - Land: 0.37 sq mi (0.97 km^{2})
  - Water: 0 sq mi (0.00 km^{2})
- Elevation: 696 ft (212 m)

Population (2020)
  - Total: 842
  - Density: 2,245.0/sq mi (866.81/km^{2})
- Time zone: UTC-5 (EST)
  - Summer (DST): UTC-5 (EST)
- ZIP code: 47433
- Area code: 812
- FIPS code: 18-28440
- GNIS feature ID: 435238
- Website: townofgosport.com

Gosport is a town in Wayne Township, Owen County, in the U.S. state of Indiana. As of the 2020 census, Gosport had a population of 842. It is part of the Bloomington, Indiana Metropolitan Statistical Area.

== History ==
Gosport was platted in 1829, and named for Ephraim Goss, an early settler. A post office has been in operation at Gosport since 1843.

The Gosport Historic District and Dr. H.G. Osgood House are listed on the National Register of Historic Places.

== Geography ==
According to the 2010 census, Gosport has a total area of 0.39 square miles (1.01 km^{2}), all land.

== Demographics ==
Historical population
Census	Pop.	Note	%±
1850	548		—
1870	860		—
1880	740		−14.0%
1890	720		−2.7%
1900	726		0.8%
1910	776		6.9%
1920	700		−9.8%
1930	722		3.1%
1940	729		1.0%
1950	672		−7.8%
1960	646		−3.9%
1970	692		7.1%
1980	729		5.3%
1990	764		4.8%
2000	715		−6.4%
2010	826		15.5%
2020	842		1.9%
U.S. Decennial Census

=== 2010 census ===
As of the census of 2010, there were 826 people, 325 households, and 202 families residing in the town. The population density was 2,117.9 inhabitants per square mile (817.7/km^{2}). There were 380 housing units at an average density of 974.4 per square mile (376.2/km^{2}). The racial makeup of the town was 98.5% White, 0.7% African American, 0.1% Asian, and 0.6% from two or more races. Hispanic or Latino of any race were 1.0% of the population.

There were 325 households, of which 35.1% had children under the age of 18 living with them, 43.1% were married couples living together, 12.3% had a female householder with no husband present, 6.8% had a male householder with no wife present, and 37.8% were non-families. 32.9% of all households were made up of individuals, and 13.5% had someone living alone who was 65 years of age or older. The average household size was 2.42 and the average family size was 3.00.

The median age in the town was 38.2 years. 25.8% of residents were under the age of 18; 8.7% were between the ages of 18 and 24; 24.9% were from 25 to 44; 23.8% were from 45 to 64; and 16.8% were 65 years of age or older. The gender makeup of the town was 46.0% male and 54.0% female.

=== 2000 census ===
As of the census of 2000, there were 715 people, 273 households, and 190 families residing in the town. The population density was 1,868.6 inhabitants per square mile (721.5/km^{2}). There were 301 housing units at an average density of 786.7 per square mile (303.7/km^{2}). The racial makeup of the town was 98.60% White, 0.42% African American, 0.42% Native American, 0.14% Asian, and 0.42% from two or more races. Hispanic or Latino of any race were 2.24% of the population.

There were 273 households, out of which 34.8% had children under the age of 18 living with them, 52.7% were married couples living together, 12.1% had a female householder with no husband present, and 30.4% were non-families. 27.1% of all households were made up of individuals, and 16.1% had someone living alone who was 65 years of age or older. The average household size was 2.44 and the average family size was 2.94.

In the town, the population was spread out, with 26.9% under the age of 18, 5.2% from 18 to 24, 27.3% from 25 to 44, 20.8% from 45 to 64, and 19.9% who were 65 years of age or older. The median age was 38 years. For every 100 females, there were 84.8 males. For every 100 females age 18 and over, there were 80.3 males.

The median income for a household in the town was $31,833, and the median income for a family was $34,545. Males had a median income of $32,396 versus $18,667 for females. The per capita income for the town was $14,101. About 14.4% of families and 17.2% of the population were below the poverty line, including 30.4% of those under age 18 and 4.4% of those age 65 or over.

== Notable people ==
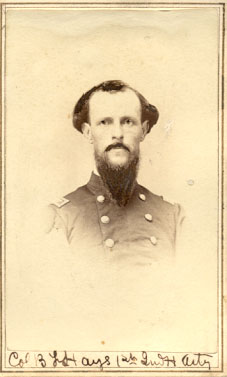
Colonel Benjamin F. Hays, 1st Indiana Heavy Artillery, (circa 1865).

- U.S. Army Colonel Benjamin F. Hays was born on September 4, 1826, in Greene County, Tennessee. He served as a Second Lieutenant in B Company, 4th Indiana Infantry during the Mexican War. During the Civil War, he served in the 1st Indiana Heavy Artillery, promoted to colonel on February 8, 1865. He fought in the Battle of Baton Rouge and the Battle of Mobile Bay. Following the war, he commanded the District of South Alabama, until he was mustered out on January 10, 1866. Then, he served in the Indiana House of Representatives in 1867. He resided in Gosport as a merchant until he died on January 14, 1872.
- U.S. Army Colonel James Ellis Burton was born on September 23, 1824, to John and Nancy Agnes (née Wishard) Burton in Mount Tabor, Indiana. He was married to Cynthia Ann (née Van Buskirk), and they had one son. He was promoted to colonel on May 4, 1865, and mustered out on July 21, 1865. Colonel Burton fought in the Atlanta campaign, the Savannah Campaign, and the Carolinas campaign. He was a merchant before the war and a farmer in Gosport afterwards. He died on September 28, 1900.
- Child actress Patsy Doris Dittemore was born in Gosport on March 20, 1934, to James and Gladys Elizabeth (May) Dittemore. Her mother died 19 days after her birth; and, she was sent to California to live with her maternal grandparents, taking their last name and being called "Patsy May." She played the baby sister of Spanky in the Our Gang series of short-subject comedies from 1935 to 1937, appearing for the first time in Little Papa and the last time in Our Gang Follies of 1938. At age 11, her final film appearance was in an uncredited role in the Great Stagecoach Robbery (1945). She died on January 1, 2013, and is buried in the Gosport Cemetery.
- Eugene M. Stoner, inventor of the M16 rifle, was born in Gosport on November 22, 1922, to Lloyd and Britannia Stoner. He joined the U.S. Marines as an armorer and fought in the South Pacific during World War II, honorably discharged as a corporal. He held some 100 patents on his inventions, and was a co-founder of Ares Incorporated, a weapons research and development company based in Port Clinton, Ohio.
- James Alexander Thom, author, was born in Gosport on May 26, 1933.
