= Spencer, Indiana =

- Town
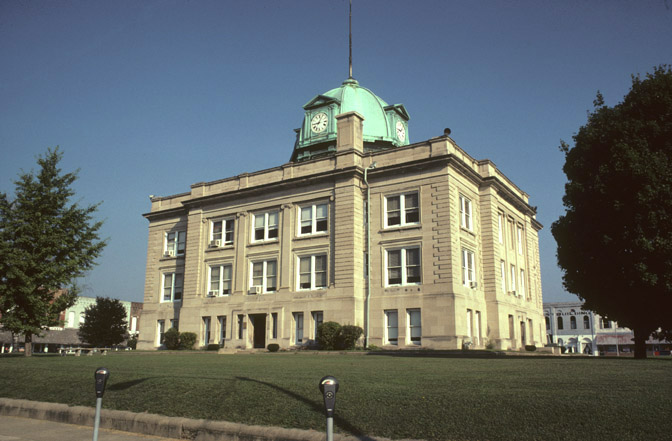
- Owen County courthouse in Spencer

- Location of Spencer in Owen County, Indiana.
- Coordinates: 39°17′13″N 86°45′51″W
- Country: United States
- State: Indiana
- County: Owen
- Township: Washington

Area
  - Total: 1.59 sq mi (4.13 km^{2})
  - Land: 1.59 sq mi (4.13 km^{2})
  - Water: 0 sq mi (0.00 km^{2})
- Elevation: 564 ft (172 m)

Population (2020)
  - Total: 2,454
  - Density: 1,539/sq mi (594.3/km^{2})
- Time zone: UTC-5 (Eastern (EST))
  - Summer (DST): UTC-4 (EDT)
- ZIP code: 47460
- Area code: 812
- FIPS code: 18-71972
- GNIS feature ID: 443934
- Website: www.spencer.in.gov

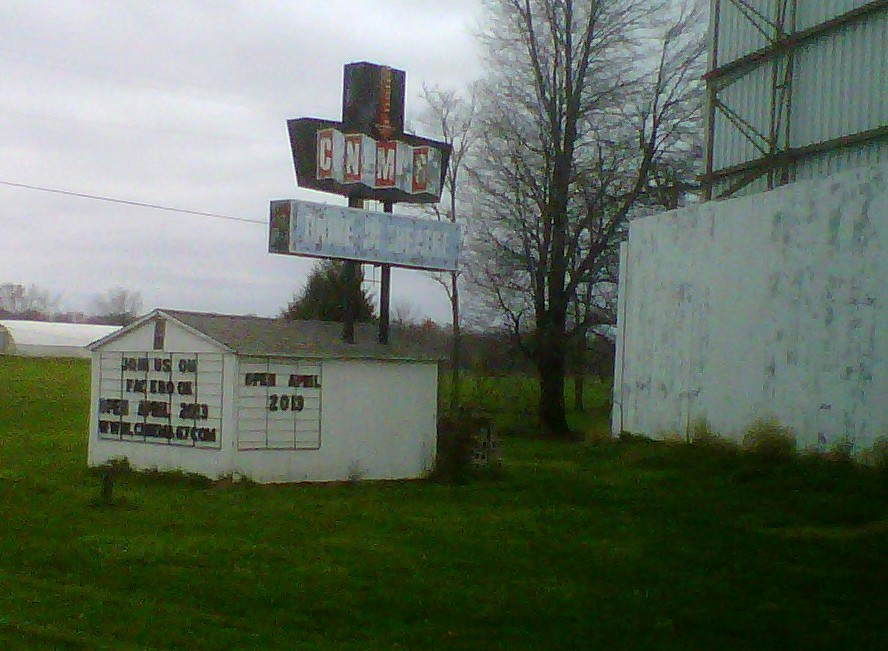
The Cinema 67 Drive-in theatre near Spencer, IN

Spencer is a town in Washington Township, Owen County, in the U.S. state of Indiana. As of the 2020 census, Spencer had a population of 2,454. It is the county seat of Owen County.

Spencer is part of the Bloomington, Indiana metropolitan area.

== History ==
Spencer was platted in 1820, and named for Captain Spier Spencer, who fell at the Battle of Tippecanoe, after whom Spencer County is also named. A post office has been in operation at Spencer since 1821. The current building was constructed with New Deal funds in 1938.

The Allison-Robinson House, David Enoch Beem House, Owen County Courthouse, Spencer Public Library, and Spencer Town Hall and Fire Station are listed on the National Register of Historic Places.

Downtown events include Christmas at the Square, Apple Butter Festival, Annual Pride Festival, and the Rev20 Christian Music Festival.

== Geography ==
According to the 2010 census, Spencer has a total area of 1.26 square miles (3.26 km^{2}), all land.

=== Climate ===
The climate in this area is characterized by hot, humid summers and generally mild to cool winters. According to the Köppen Climate Classification system, Spencer has a humid subtropical climate, abbreviated "Cfa" on climate maps.

Climate data for Spencer, Indiana (Spencer) 1991–2020 normals, extremes 1946–present
Month	Jan	Feb	Mar	Apr	May	Jun	Jul	Aug	Sep	Oct	Nov	Dec	Year
Record high °F (°C)	73 (23)	77 (25)	85 (29)	89 (32)	95 (35)	104 (40)	107 (42)	102 (39)	104 (40)	93 (34)	84 (29)	76 (24)	107 (42)
Mean daily maximum °F (°C)	37.2 (2.9)	41.7 (5.4)	52.3 (11.3)	64.4 (18.0)	73.9 (23.3)	82.1 (27.8)	85.4 (29.7)	84.4 (29.1)	78.8 (26.0)	66.9 (19.4)	53.0 (11.7)	41.9 (5.5)	63.5 (17.5)
Daily mean °F (°C)	28.7 (−1.8)	32.1 (0.1)	41.5 (5.3)	52.5 (11.4)	62.5 (16.9)	71.2 (21.8)	74.7 (23.7)	73.2 (22.9)	66.4 (19.1)	54.5 (12.5)	42.7 (5.9)	33.4 (0.8)	52.8 (11.6)
Mean daily minimum °F (°C)	20.2 (−6.6)	22.6 (−5.2)	30.6 (−0.8)	40.6 (4.8)	51.1 (10.6)	60.2 (15.7)	64.0 (17.8)	62.0 (16.7)	54.0 (12.2)	42.1 (5.6)	32.3 (0.2)	25.0 (−3.9)	42.1 (5.6)
Record low °F (°C)	−33 (−36)	−23 (−31)	−12 (−24)	15 (−9)	26 (−3)	34 (1)	39 (4)	40 (4)	28 (−2)	14 (−10)	−4 (−20)	−24 (−31)	−33 (−36)
Average precipitation inches (mm)	3.45 (88)	2.64 (67)	3.65 (93)	5.34 (136)	5.19 (132)	5.82 (148)	4.93 (125)	3.58 (91)	3.76 (96)	3.86 (98)	4.01 (102)	3.46 (88)	49.69 (1,262)
Average snowfall inches (cm)	6.9 (18)	4.2 (11)	1.5 (3.8)	0.1 (0.25)	0.0 (0.0)	0.0 (0.0)	0.0 (0.0)	0.0 (0.0)	0.0 (0.0)	0.0 (0.0)	0.3 (0.76)	2.8 (7.1)	15.8 (40)
Average precipitation days (≥ 0.01 in)	11.7	9.8	11.1	12.9	13.0	11.8	10.3	7.7	7.8	9.1	9.9	11.0	126.1
Average snowy days (≥ 0.1 in)	3.9	2.8	0.8	0.1	0.0	0.0	0.0	0.0	0.0	0.0	0.2	2.4	10.2
Source: NOAA

== Demographics ==
Historical population
Census	Pop.	Note	%±
1850	335		—
1870	971		—
1880	1,655		70.4%
1890	1,868		12.9%
1900	2,026		8.5%
1910	2,150		6.1%
1920	2,066		−3.9%
1930	2,179		5.5%
1940	2,375		9.0%
1950	2,394		0.8%
1960	2,557		6.8%
1970	2,553		−0.2%
1980	2,732		7.0%
1990	2,609		−4.5%
2000	2,508		−3.9%
2010	2,217		−11.6%
2020	2,454		10.7%
U.S. Decennial Census

=== 2020 census ===
As of the 2020 census, Spencer had a population of 2,454. The median age was 43.9 years. 18.1% of residents were under the age of 18 and 25.6% of residents were 65 years of age or older. For every 100 females there were 85.2 males, and for every 100 females age 18 and over there were 82.3 males age 18 and over.

0.0% of residents lived in urban areas, while 100.0% lived in rural areas.

There were 1,112 households in Spencer, of which 21.3% had children under the age of 18 living in them. Of all households, 32.7% were married-couple households, 21.3% were households with a male householder and no spouse or partner present, and 38.4% were households with a female householder and no spouse or partner present. About 43.4% of all households were made up of individuals and 23.4% had someone living alone who was 65 years of age or older.

There were 1,199 housing units, of which 7.3% were vacant. The homeowner vacancy rate was 1.1% and the rental vacancy rate was 7.0%.

Racial composition as of the 2020 census
Race	Number	Percent
White	2,260	92.1%
Black or African American	10	0.4%
American Indian and Alaska Native	0	0.0%
Asian	16	0.7%
Native Hawaiian and Other Pacific Islander	0	0.0%
Some other race	12	0.5%
Two or more races	156	6.4%
Hispanic or Latino (of any race)	53	2.2%

=== 2010 census ===
As of the census of 2010, there were 2,217 people, 1,008 households, and 554 families living in the town. The population density was 1,759.5 inhabitants per square mile (679.3/km^{2}). There were 1,123 housing units at an average density of 891.3 per square mile (344.1/km^{2}). The racial makeup of the town was 98.1% White, 0.1% African American, 0.2% Native American, 0.5% Asian, 0.2% from other races, and 0.9% from two or more races. Hispanic or Latino of any race were 2.1% of the population.

There were 1,008 households, of which 24.6% had children under the age of 18 living with them, 38.4% were married couples living together, 12.8% had a female householder with no husband present, 3.8% had a male householder with no wife present, and 45.0% were non-families. 40.1% of all households were made up of individuals, and 18.4% had someone living alone who was 65 years of age or older. The average household size was 2.12 and the average family size was 2.81.

The median age in the town was 41.8 years. 20.1% of residents were under the age of 18; 9.4% were between the ages of 18 and 24; 24.2% were from 25 to 44; 26.3% were from 45 to 64; and 19.8% were 65 years of age or older. The gender makeup of the town was 47.2% male and 52.8% female.

=== 2000 census ===
As of the census of 2000, there were 2,508 people, 1,090 households, and 659 families living in the town. The population density was 1,984.6 inhabitants per square mile (766.3/km^{2}). There were 1,193 housing units at an average density of 944.0 per square mile (364.5/km^{2}). The racial makeup of the town was 98.52% White, 0.20% African American, 0.40% Asian, 0.24% from other races, and 0.64% from two or more races. Hispanic or Latino of any race were 0.60% of the population.

There were 1,090 households, out of which 27.2% had children under the age of 18 living with them, 45.1% were married couples living together, 12.8% had a female householder with no husband present, and 39.5% were non-families. 35.0% of all households were made up of individuals, and 18.5% had someone living alone who was 65 years of age or older. The average household size was 2.23 and the average family size was 2.88.

In the town, the population was spread out, with 23.0% under the age of 18, 10.1% from 18 to 24, 26.7% from 25 to 44, 20.3% from 45 to 64, and 20.0% who were 65 years of age or older. The median age was 39 years. For every 100 females, there were 83.2 males. For every 100 females age 18 and over, there were 81.9 males.

The median income for a household in the town was $28,664, and the median income for a family was $36,921. Males had a median income of $29,679 versus $21,531 for females. The per capita income for the town was $15,843. About 8.4% of families and 9.5% of the population were below the poverty line, including 13.2% of those under age 18 and 8.8% of those age 65 or over.

== Education ==
Owen Valley Community High School (OVHS) is located in Spencer with 980 students and more than 100 faculty members. Built in 1971, OVHS is the result of a consolidation of several smaller schools located within Owen County. Owen Valley's mascot is the Patriot, and the school's colors are red, white and blue. The school's yearbook is the Triad, Tri- representing the three schools that were merged to create Owen Valley High School.

The town has a lending library, the Owen County Public Library.
