= Bloomington metropolitan area, Indiana =

Bloomington Metropolitan Area Bloomington, IN Metropolitan Statistical Area
- Metropolitan Statistical Area
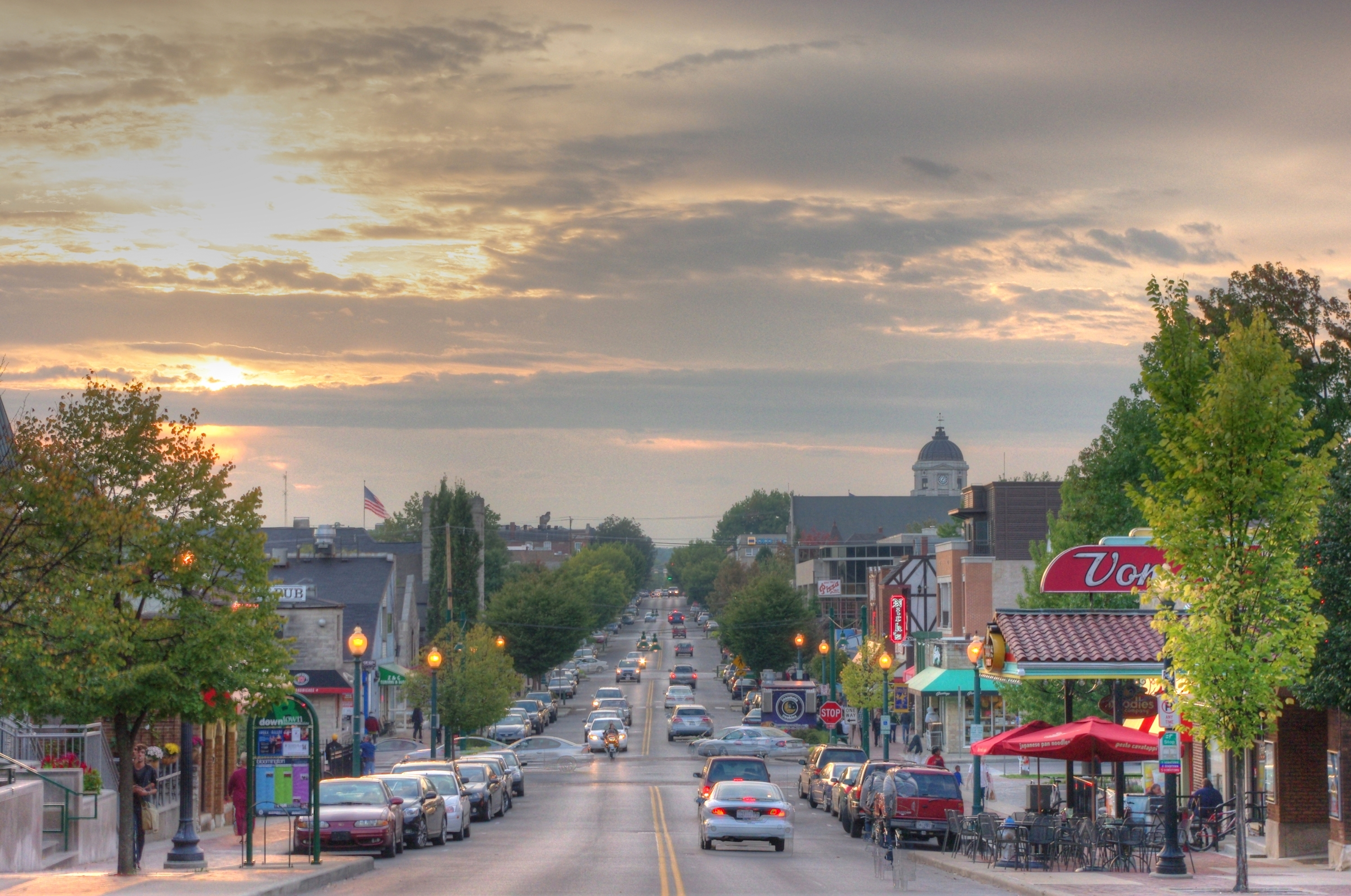
- Downtown Bloomington
Interactive Map of Bloomington–Bedford, IN CSA
Bloomington, IN MSA
Bedford, IN µSA
City of Bloomington
- Country: United States
- State: Indiana
- Time zone: UTC−5 (EST)
  - Summer (DST): UTC−4 (EDT)

The Bloomington, Indiana, Metropolitan Statistical Area, as defined by the United States Census Bureau, is an area comprising two counties (Monroe and Owen) in south-central Indiana. The city of Bloomington in Monroe County is the area's principal municipality and its anchor. At the 2010 United States census, the MSA had a population of 192,714.

== Counties ==
- Monroe
- Owen

== Communities ==
=== Places with more than 50,000 inhabitants ===
- Bloomington (pop 84,465)

=== Places with 5,000 to 10,000 inhabitants ===
- Ellettsville
- Linton

=== Places with 1,000 to 5,000 inhabitants ===
- Bloomfield
- Jasonville
- Spencer
- Worthington

=== Places with less than 1,000 inhabitants ===
- Gosport
- Lyons
- Newberry
- Stinesville
- Switz City

=== Unincorporated places ===
- Adel
- Alaska
- Arlington
- Arney
- Atkinsonville
- Beehunter
- Braysville
- Broadview
- Calvertville
- Carp
- Cascade
- Cataract
- Chapel Hill
- Cincinnati
- Clear Creek
- Coal City
- Cuba
- Cunot
- Daggett
- Denmark
- Devore
- Doans
- Dolan
- Ellis
- Elliston
- Elwren
- Farmers
- Fleener
- Forest Park Heights
- Freedom
- Freeman
- Furnace
- Garden Acres
- Gilmour
- Handy
- Harrodsburg
- Hashtown
- Hendricksville
- Hindustan
- Hobbieville
- Hoosier
- Island City
- Johnstown
- Jordan
- Kirby
- Kirksville
- Knight Ridge
- Koleen
- Lancaster Park
- Leonard Springs
- Lewisville
- Lone Tree
- Marco
- McVille
- Midland Junction
- Midland
- Mineral City
- Mount Tabor
- New Unionville
- Newark
- Owensburg
- Park
- Patricksburg
- Plummer
- Point Commerce
- Pottersville
- Quincy
- Ridgeport
- Rincon
- Romona
- Sanders
- Scotland
- Smithville (Monroe Co.)
- Solsberry
- Southport
- Stanford
- Sunny Slopes
- Tulip
- Unionville
- Van Buren Park
- Vandalia
- Vicksburg
- Victor
- Vilas
- Wallace Junction
- Whitehall
- Woodville Hills
- Yellowstone

== Townships ==
=== Monroe County ===
- Bean Blossom
- Benton
- Bloomington
- Clear Creek
- Indian Creek
- Perry
- Polk
- Richland
- Salt Creek
- Van Buren
- Washington

=== Owen County ===
- Clay
- Franklin
- Harrison
- Jackson
- Jefferson
- Jennings
- Lafayette
- Marion
- Montgomery
- Morgan
- Taylor
- Washington
- Wayne

== Demographics ==
As of the census of 2000, there were 175,506 people, 68,552 households, and 40,269 families residing within the MSA. The racial makeup of the MSA was 93.22% White, 2.11% African American, 0.29% Native American, 2.38% Asian, 0.04% Pacific Islander, 0.64% from other races, and 1.34% from two or more races. Hispanic or Latino of any race were 1.52% of the population.

The median income for a household in the MSA was $34,613, and the median income for a family was $44,621. Males had a median income of $32,794 versus $23,202 for females. The per capita income for the MSA was $17,417.

== See also ==
- Indiana census statistical areas
