= Pottersville =

Pottersville may refer to:

- Pottersville, Indiana
- Pottersville, New Jersey, a community
- Pottersville, New York, a hamlet in the town of Chester, Warren County, New York
- Pottersville District, Harrisville, NH, in the National Register of Historic Places listings in New Hampshire
- Pottersville Village Historic District, Pottersville, NJ, in the National Register of Historic Places listings in New Jersey
- Pottersville (Edgefield, South Carolina), in the National Register of Historic Places listings in South Carolina
- Pottersville (film)
- Pottersville, an unincorporated village in Howell County, Missouri.
- Pottersville, a fictional town in the 1946 Frank Capra film It's a Wonderful Life
- A rental slum, named after the aforementioned Pottersville in It's a Wonderful Life.
