= Indiana statistical areas =

Coordinates: 39.8942°N 86.2816°W

The U.S. state of Indiana currently has 50 statistical areas that have been delineated by the Office of Management and Budget (OMB). On July 21, 2023, the OMB delineated ten combined statistical areas, 15 metropolitan statistical areas, and 25 micropolitan statistical areas in Indiana. As of 2025, the largest of these was the Indianapolis–Carmel–Muncie, IN Combined Statistical Area, consisting of Indianapolis and its surrounding counties.

== Statistical areas ==
The Office of Management and Budget (OMB) has designated more than 1,000 statistical areas for the United States and Puerto Rico. These statistical areas are important geographic delineations of population clusters used by the OMB, the United States Census Bureau, planning organizations, and federal, state, and local government entities.

The OMB defines a core-based statistical area (CBSA) as the county or counties (or county-equivalents) surrounding at least one densely-settled core of at least 10,000 population, "plus adjacent counties having a high degree of social and economic integration with the core as measured through commuting ties with the counties containing the core". The OMB further divides a CBSA based on population into a metropolitan statistical area (MSA) for those with at least 50,000 people or a micropolitan statistical area (μSA) for those with 10,000 to 49,999 people.

The OMB defines a combined statistical area (CSA) as two or more adjacent CBSAs where the employment interchange rate (percent commuting from A to B plus percent commuting from B to A) is at least 15%. A primary statistical area (PSA) includes all CSAs and any CBSA that is not a constituent of a combined statistical area.

The 50 United States statistical areas and 92 counties of the State of Indiana (Note: An out-of-state area and its population are displayed in green. An area that extends into more than one state is displayed in purple. A purple population number over a black population number show the total population versus the in-state population. The state's abbreviation is also shown next to the in-state total.)
Combined statistical area	2025 population (est.)	Core-based statistical area	2025 population (est.)	County	2025 population (est.)	Metropolitan division	2025 population (est.)
Indianapolis–Carmel–Muncie, IN CSA	2,722,834	Indianapolis–Carmel–Greenwood, IN MSA	2,205,695	Marion County, Indiana	992,196	none	
Indianapolis–Carmel–Muncie, IN CSA	2,722,834	Indianapolis–Carmel–Greenwood, IN MSA	2,205,695	Hamilton County, Indiana	387,036	none	
Indianapolis–Carmel–Muncie, IN CSA	2,722,834	Indianapolis–Carmel–Greenwood, IN MSA	2,205,695	Hendricks County, Indiana	193,510	none	
Indianapolis–Carmel–Muncie, IN CSA	2,722,834	Indianapolis–Carmel–Greenwood, IN MSA	2,205,695	Johnson County, Indiana	174,262	none	
Indianapolis–Carmel–Muncie, IN CSA	2,722,834	Indianapolis–Carmel–Greenwood, IN MSA	2,205,695	Madison County, Indiana	135,088	none	
Indianapolis–Carmel–Muncie, IN CSA	2,722,834	Indianapolis–Carmel–Greenwood, IN MSA	2,205,695	Hancock County, Indiana	90,969	none	
Indianapolis–Carmel–Muncie, IN CSA	2,722,834	Indianapolis–Carmel–Greenwood, IN MSA	2,205,695	Boone County, Indiana	80,689	none	
Indianapolis–Carmel–Muncie, IN CSA	2,722,834	Indianapolis–Carmel–Greenwood, IN MSA	2,205,695	Morgan County, Indiana	74,967	none	
Indianapolis–Carmel–Muncie, IN CSA	2,722,834	Indianapolis–Carmel–Greenwood, IN MSA	2,205,695	Shelby County, Indiana	45,882	none	
Indianapolis–Carmel–Muncie, IN CSA	2,722,834	Indianapolis–Carmel–Greenwood, IN MSA	2,205,695	Brown County, Indiana	15,777	none	
Indianapolis–Carmel–Muncie, IN CSA	2,722,834	Indianapolis–Carmel–Greenwood, IN MSA	2,205,695	Tipton County, Indiana	15,319	none	
Indianapolis–Carmel–Muncie, IN CSA	2,722,834	Muncie, IN MSA	113,106	Delaware County, Indiana	113,106	none	
Indianapolis–Carmel–Muncie, IN CSA	2,722,834	Columbus, IN MSA	85,729	Bartholomew County, Indiana	85,729	none	
Indianapolis–Carmel–Muncie, IN CSA	2,722,834	Kokomo, IN MSA	83,904	Howard County, Indiana	83,904	none	
Indianapolis–Carmel–Muncie, IN CSA	2,722,834	New Castle, IN μSA	49,137	Henry County, Indiana	49,137	none	
Indianapolis–Carmel–Muncie, IN CSA	2,722,834	Seymour, IN μSA	47,370	Jackson County, Indiana	47,370	none	
Indianapolis–Carmel–Muncie, IN CSA	2,722,834	Crawfordsville, IN μSA	38,954	Montgomery County, Indiana	38,954	none	
Indianapolis–Carmel–Muncie, IN CSA	2,722,834	Greencastle, IN μSA	37,876	Putnam County, Indiana	37,876	none	
Indianapolis–Carmel–Muncie, IN CSA	2,722,834	Peru, IN μSA	34,487	Miami County, Indiana	34,487	none	
Indianapolis–Carmel–Muncie, IN CSA	2,722,834	Greensburg, IN μSA	26,576	Decatur County, Indiana	26,576	none	
Chicago–Naperville, IL-IN-WI CSA	9,965,292; 840,037 (IN)	Chicago–Naperville–Elgin, IL-IN-WI MSA	9,434,123; 728,743 (IN)	Cook County, Illinois	5,194,625	Chicago–Naperville–Schaumburg, IL MD	7,212,979
Chicago–Naperville, IL-IN-WI CSA	9,965,292; 840,037 (IN)	Chicago–Naperville–Elgin, IL-IN-WI MSA	9,434,123; 728,743 (IN)	DuPage County, Illinois	934,298	Chicago–Naperville–Schaumburg, IL MD	7,212,979
Chicago–Naperville, IL-IN-WI CSA	9,965,292; 840,037 (IN)	Chicago–Naperville–Elgin, IL-IN-WI MSA	9,434,123; 728,743 (IN)	Will County, Illinois	712,253	Chicago–Naperville–Schaumburg, IL MD	7,212,979
Chicago–Naperville, IL-IN-WI CSA	9,965,292; 840,037 (IN)	Chicago–Naperville–Elgin, IL-IN-WI MSA	9,434,123; 728,743 (IN)	McHenry County, Illinois	317,751	Chicago–Naperville–Schaumburg, IL MD	7,212,979
Chicago–Naperville, IL-IN-WI CSA	9,965,292; 840,037 (IN)	Chicago–Naperville–Elgin, IL-IN-WI MSA	9,434,123; 728,743 (IN)	Grundy County, Illinois	54,052	Chicago–Naperville–Schaumburg, IL MD	7,212,979
Chicago–Naperville, IL-IN-WI CSA	9,965,292; 840,037 (IN)	Chicago–Naperville–Elgin, IL-IN-WI MSA	9,434,123; 728,743 (IN)	Kane County, Illinois	525,757	Elgin, IL MD	773,062
Chicago–Naperville, IL-IN-WI CSA	9,965,292; 840,037 (IN)	Chicago–Naperville–Elgin, IL-IN-WI MSA	9,434,123; 728,743 (IN)	Kendall County, Illinois	145,470	Elgin, IL MD	773,062
Chicago–Naperville, IL-IN-WI CSA	9,965,292; 840,037 (IN)	Chicago–Naperville–Elgin, IL-IN-WI MSA	9,434,123; 728,743 (IN)	DeKalb County, Illinois	101,835	Elgin, IL MD	773,062
Chicago–Naperville, IL-IN-WI CSA	9,965,292; 840,037 (IN)	Chicago–Naperville–Elgin, IL-IN-WI MSA	9,434,123; 728,743 (IN)	Lake County, Indiana	504,612	Lake County–Porter County–Jasper County, IN MD	728,743
Chicago–Naperville, IL-IN-WI CSA	9,965,292; 840,037 (IN)	Chicago–Naperville–Elgin, IL-IN-WI MSA	9,434,123; 728,743 (IN)	Porter County, Indiana	176,049	Lake County–Porter County–Jasper County, IN MD	728,743
Chicago–Naperville, IL-IN-WI CSA	9,965,292; 840,037 (IN)	Chicago–Naperville–Elgin, IL-IN-WI MSA	9,434,123; 728,743 (IN)	Jasper County, Indiana	33,894	Lake County–Porter County–Jasper County, IN MD	728,743
Chicago–Naperville, IL-IN-WI CSA	9,965,292; 840,037 (IN)	Chicago–Naperville–Elgin, IL-IN-WI MSA	9,434,123; 728,743 (IN)	Newton County, Indiana	14,188	Lake County–Porter County–Jasper County, IN MD	728,743
Chicago–Naperville, IL-IN-WI CSA	9,965,292; 840,037 (IN)	Chicago–Naperville–Elgin, IL-IN-WI MSA	9,434,123; 728,743 (IN)	Lake County, Illinois	719,339	Lake County, IL MD	719,339
Chicago–Naperville, IL-IN-WI CSA	9,965,292; 840,037 (IN)	Kenosha, WI MSA	168,448	Kenosha County, Wisconsin	168,448	none	
Chicago–Naperville, IL-IN-WI CSA	9,965,292; 840,037 (IN)	Ottawa, IL μSA	145,902	LaSalle County, Illinois	107,773	none	
Chicago–Naperville, IL-IN-WI CSA	9,965,292; 840,037 (IN)	Ottawa, IL μSA	145,902	Bureau County, Illinois	32,510	none	
Chicago–Naperville, IL-IN-WI CSA	9,965,292; 840,037 (IN)	Ottawa, IL μSA	145,902	Putnam County, Illinois	5,619	none	
Chicago–Naperville, IL-IN-WI CSA	9,965,292; 840,037 (IN)	Michigan City–La Porte, IN MSA	111,294	LaPorte County, Indiana	111,294	none	
Chicago–Naperville, IL-IN-WI CSA	9,965,292; 840,037 (IN)	Kankakee, IL MSA	105,525	Kankakee County, Illinois	105,525	none	
Fort Wayne–Huntington–Auburn, IN CSA	667,403	Fort Wayne, IN MSA	466,258	Allen County, Indiana	402,329	none	
Fort Wayne–Huntington–Auburn, IN CSA	667,403	Fort Wayne, IN MSA	466,258	Whitley County, Indiana	35,046	none	
Fort Wayne–Huntington–Auburn, IN CSA	667,403	Fort Wayne, IN MSA	466,258	Wells County, Indiana	28,883	none	
Fort Wayne–Huntington–Auburn, IN CSA	667,403	Kendallville, IN μSA	47,937	Noble County, Indiana	47,937	none	
Fort Wayne–Huntington–Auburn, IN CSA	667,403	Auburn, IN μSA	44,535	DeKalb County, Indiana	44,535	none	
Fort Wayne–Huntington–Auburn, IN CSA	667,403	Huntington, IN μSA	37,224	Huntington County, Indiana	37,224	none	
Fort Wayne–Huntington–Auburn, IN CSA	667,403	Decatur, IN μSA	36,650	Adams County, Indiana	36,650	none	
Fort Wayne–Huntington–Auburn, IN CSA	667,403	Angola, IN μSA	34,799	Steuben County, Indiana	34,799	none	
South Bend–Elkhart–Mishawaka, IN-MI CSA	813,247; 609,126 (IN)	South Bend–Mishawaka, IN-MI MSA	324,538; 272,861 (IN)	St. Joseph County, Indiana	272,861	none	
South Bend–Elkhart–Mishawaka, IN-MI CSA	813,247; 609,126 (IN)	South Bend–Mishawaka, IN-MI MSA	324,538; 272,861 (IN)	Cass County, Michigan	51,677	none	
South Bend–Elkhart–Mishawaka, IN-MI CSA	813,247; 609,126 (IN)	Elkhart–Goshen, IN MSA	208,774	Elkhart County, Indiana	208,774	none	
South Bend–Elkhart–Mishawaka, IN-MI CSA	813,247; 609,126 (IN)	Niles, MI MSA	152,444	Berrien County, Michigan	152,444	none	
South Bend–Elkhart–Mishawaka, IN-MI CSA	813,247; 609,126 (IN)	Warsaw, IN μSA	80,892	Kosciusko County, Indiana	80,892	none	
South Bend–Elkhart–Mishawaka, IN-MI CSA	813,247; 609,126 (IN)	Plymouth, IN μSA	46,599	Marshall County, Indiana	46,599	none	
Lafayette–West Lafayette–Frankfort, IN CSA	286,954	Lafayette, IN MSA	228,468	Tippecanoe County, Indiana	190,456	none	
Lafayette–West Lafayette–Frankfort, IN CSA	286,954	Lafayette, IN MSA	228,468	Carroll County, Indiana	20,655	none	
Lafayette–West Lafayette–Frankfort, IN CSA	286,954	Lafayette, IN MSA	228,468	Benton County, Indiana	8,883	none	
Lafayette–West Lafayette–Frankfort, IN CSA	286,954	Lafayette, IN MSA	228,468	Warren County, Indiana	8,474	none	
Lafayette–West Lafayette–Frankfort, IN CSA	286,954	Frankfort, IN μSA	33,322	Clinton County, Indiana	33,322	none	
Lafayette–West Lafayette–Frankfort, IN CSA	286,954	Monticello, IN μSA	25,164	White County, Indiana	25,164	none	
Louisville/Jefferson County–Elizabethtown, KY-IN CSA	1,531,175; 281,424 (IN)	Louisville/Jefferson County, KY-IN MSA	1,402,509; 281,424 (IN)	Jefferson County, Kentucky	795,222	none	
Louisville/Jefferson County–Elizabethtown, KY-IN CSA	1,531,175; 281,424 (IN)	Louisville/Jefferson County, KY-IN MSA	1,402,509; 281,424 (IN)	Clark County, Indiana	130,451	none	
Louisville/Jefferson County–Elizabethtown, KY-IN CSA	1,531,175; 281,424 (IN)	Louisville/Jefferson County, KY-IN MSA	1,402,509; 281,424 (IN)	Bullitt County, Kentucky	86,454	none	
Louisville/Jefferson County–Elizabethtown, KY-IN CSA	1,531,175; 281,424 (IN)	Louisville/Jefferson County, KY-IN MSA	1,402,509; 281,424 (IN)	Floyd County, Indiana	82,153	none	
Louisville/Jefferson County–Elizabethtown, KY-IN CSA	1,531,175; 281,424 (IN)	Louisville/Jefferson County, KY-IN MSA	1,402,509; 281,424 (IN)	Oldham County, Kentucky	70,986	none	
Louisville/Jefferson County–Elizabethtown, KY-IN CSA	1,531,175; 281,424 (IN)	Louisville/Jefferson County, KY-IN MSA	1,402,509; 281,424 (IN)	Shelby County, Kentucky	51,243	none	
Louisville/Jefferson County–Elizabethtown, KY-IN CSA	1,531,175; 281,424 (IN)	Louisville/Jefferson County, KY-IN MSA	1,402,509; 281,424 (IN)	Nelson County, Kentucky	49,036	none	
Louisville/Jefferson County–Elizabethtown, KY-IN CSA	1,531,175; 281,424 (IN)	Louisville/Jefferson County, KY-IN MSA	1,402,509; 281,424 (IN)	Harrison County, Indiana	40,437	none	
Louisville/Jefferson County–Elizabethtown, KY-IN CSA	1,531,175; 281,424 (IN)	Louisville/Jefferson County, KY-IN MSA	1,402,509; 281,424 (IN)	Meade County, Kentucky	30,699	none	
Louisville/Jefferson County–Elizabethtown, KY-IN CSA	1,531,175; 281,424 (IN)	Louisville/Jefferson County, KY-IN MSA	1,402,509; 281,424 (IN)	Washington County, Indiana	28,383	none	
Louisville/Jefferson County–Elizabethtown, KY-IN CSA	1,531,175; 281,424 (IN)	Louisville/Jefferson County, KY-IN MSA	1,402,509; 281,424 (IN)	Spencer County, Kentucky	20,998	none	
Louisville/Jefferson County–Elizabethtown, KY-IN CSA	1,531,175; 281,424 (IN)	Louisville/Jefferson County, KY-IN MSA	1,402,509; 281,424 (IN)	Henry County, Kentucky	16,447	none	
Louisville/Jefferson County–Elizabethtown, KY-IN CSA	1,531,175; 281,424 (IN)	Elizabethtown, KY MSA	128,666	Hardin County, Kentucky	113,482	none	
Louisville/Jefferson County–Elizabethtown, KY-IN CSA	1,531,175; 281,424 (IN)	Elizabethtown, KY MSA	128,666	LaRue County, Kentucky	15,184	none	
Evansville–Henderson, IN-KY CSA	330,970; 273,786 (IN)	Evansville, IN MSA	273,786	Vanderburgh County, Indiana	181,995	none	
Evansville–Henderson, IN-KY CSA	330,970; 273,786 (IN)	Evansville, IN MSA	273,786	Warrick County, Indiana	66,803	none	
Evansville–Henderson, IN-KY CSA	330,970; 273,786 (IN)	Evansville, IN MSA	273,786	Posey County, Indiana	24,988	none	
Evansville–Henderson, IN-KY CSA	330,970; 273,786 (IN)	Henderson, KY μSA	57,184	Henderson County, Kentucky	44,255	none	
Evansville–Henderson, IN-KY CSA	330,970; 273,786 (IN)	Henderson, KY μSA	57,184	Webster County, Kentucky	12,929	none	
Bloomington–Bedford, IN CSA	210,799	Bloomington, IN MSA	165,231	Monroe County, Indiana	143,345	none	
Bloomington–Bedford, IN CSA	210,799	Bloomington, IN MSA	165,231	Owen County, Indiana	21,886	none	
Bloomington–Bedford, IN CSA	210,799	Bedford, IN μSA	45,568	Lawrence County, Indiana	45,568	none	
none		Terre Haute, IN MSA	169,241	Vigo County, Indiana	106,512	none	
none		Terre Haute, IN MSA	169,241	Clay County, Indiana	26,410	none	
none		Terre Haute, IN MSA	169,241	Sullivan County, Indiana	20,831	none	
none		Terre Haute, IN MSA	169,241	Vermillion County, Indiana	15,488	none	
Richmond–Connersville, IN CSA	89,702	Richmond, IN μSA	66,169	Wayne County, Indiana	66,169	none	
Richmond–Connersville, IN CSA	89,702	Connersville, IN μSA	23,533	Fayette County, Indiana	23,533	none	
Cincinnati–Wilmington, OH-KY-IN CSA	2,355,159; 80,889 (IN)	Cincinnati, OH-KY-IN MSA	2,312,858; 80,889 (IN)	Hamilton County, Ohio	838,418	none	
Cincinnati–Wilmington, OH-KY-IN CSA	2,355,159; 80,889 (IN)	Cincinnati, OH-KY-IN MSA	2,312,858; 80,889 (IN)	Butler County, Ohio	400,128	none	
Cincinnati–Wilmington, OH-KY-IN CSA	2,355,159; 80,889 (IN)	Cincinnati, OH-KY-IN MSA	2,312,858; 80,889 (IN)	Warren County, Ohio	257,181	none	
Cincinnati–Wilmington, OH-KY-IN CSA	2,355,159; 80,889 (IN)	Cincinnati, OH-KY-IN MSA	2,312,858; 80,889 (IN)	Clermont County, Ohio	216,977	none	
Cincinnati–Wilmington, OH-KY-IN CSA	2,355,159; 80,889 (IN)	Cincinnati, OH-KY-IN MSA	2,312,858; 80,889 (IN)	Kenton County, Kentucky	175,779	none	
Cincinnati–Wilmington, OH-KY-IN CSA	2,355,159; 80,889 (IN)	Cincinnati, OH-KY-IN MSA	2,312,858; 80,889 (IN)	Boone County, Kentucky	145,316	none	
Cincinnati–Wilmington, OH-KY-IN CSA	2,355,159; 80,889 (IN)	Cincinnati, OH-KY-IN MSA	2,312,858; 80,889 (IN)	Campbell County, Kentucky	95,441	none	
Cincinnati–Wilmington, OH-KY-IN CSA	2,355,159; 80,889 (IN)	Cincinnati, OH-KY-IN MSA	2,312,858; 80,889 (IN)	Dearborn County, Indiana	51,609	none	
Cincinnati–Wilmington, OH-KY-IN CSA	2,355,159; 80,889 (IN)	Cincinnati, OH-KY-IN MSA	2,312,858; 80,889 (IN)	Brown County, Ohio	44,397	none	
Cincinnati–Wilmington, OH-KY-IN CSA	2,355,159; 80,889 (IN)	Cincinnati, OH-KY-IN MSA	2,312,858; 80,889 (IN)	Grant County, Kentucky	26,181	none	
Cincinnati–Wilmington, OH-KY-IN CSA	2,355,159; 80,889 (IN)	Cincinnati, OH-KY-IN MSA	2,312,858; 80,889 (IN)	Franklin County, Indiana	23,286	none	
Cincinnati–Wilmington, OH-KY-IN CSA	2,355,159; 80,889 (IN)	Cincinnati, OH-KY-IN MSA	2,312,858; 80,889 (IN)	Pendleton County, Kentucky	14,800	none	
Cincinnati–Wilmington, OH-KY-IN CSA	2,355,159; 80,889 (IN)	Cincinnati, OH-KY-IN MSA	2,312,858; 80,889 (IN)	Gallatin County, Kentucky	8,840	none	
Cincinnati–Wilmington, OH-KY-IN CSA	2,355,159; 80,889 (IN)	Cincinnati, OH-KY-IN MSA	2,312,858; 80,889 (IN)	Bracken County, Kentucky	8,511	none	
Cincinnati–Wilmington, OH-KY-IN CSA	2,355,159; 80,889 (IN)	Cincinnati, OH-KY-IN MSA	2,312,858; 80,889 (IN)	Ohio County, Indiana	5,994	none	
Cincinnati–Wilmington, OH-KY-IN CSA	2,355,159; 80,889 (IN)	Wilmington, OH μSA	42,301	Clinton County, Ohio	42,301	none	
none		Marion, IN μSA	66,524	Grant County, Indiana	66,524	none	
none		Jasper, IN μSA	44,016	Dubois County, Indiana	44,016	none	
none		Logansport, IN μSA	37,836	Cass County, Indiana	37,836	none	
none		Vincennes, IN μSA	35,652	Knox County, Indiana	35,652	none	
none		Washington, IN μSA	34,209	Daviess County, Indiana	34,209	none	
none		Madison, IN μSA	33,279	Jefferson County, Indiana	33,279	none	
none		Wabash, IN μSA	30,713	Wabash County, Indiana	30,713	none	
none		none		LaGrange County, Indiana	41,305	none	
none		none		Gibson County, Indiana	33,091	none	
none		none		Greene County, Indiana	31,165	none	
none		none		Ripley County, Indiana	29,434	none	
none		none		Jennings County, Indiana	27,622	none	
none		none		Scott County, Indiana	25,053	none	
none		none		Randolph County, Indiana	24,438	none	
none		none		Starke County, Indiana	23,425	none	
none		none		Jay County, Indiana	20,118	none	
none		none		Fulton County, Indiana	20,091	none	
none		none		Spencer County, Indiana	20,061	none	
none		none		Orange County, Indiana	19,834	none	
none		none		Perry County, Indiana	19,389	none	
none		none		Fountain County, Indiana	17,013	none	
none		none		Rush County, Indiana	16,767	none	
none		none		Parke County, Indiana	16,642	none	
none		none		Pulaski County, Indiana	12,463	none	
none		none		Pike County, Indiana	12,003	none	
none		none		Blackford County, Indiana	11,730	none	
none		none		Crawford County, Indiana	10,509	none	
none		none		Switzerland County, Indiana	10,037	none	
none		none		Martin County, Indiana	9,856	none	
none		none		Union County, Indiana	6,863	none	
State of Indiana					6,973,333	none	

The 40 core-based statistical areas of the State of Indiana (Note: For CBSAs comprising populations from multiple states, they are listed twice to show both their intrastate population within that CBSA as well as the CBSA's total population. Only the intrastate population is ranked.)
2025 rank	Core-based statistical area	Population				
2025 rank	Core-based statistical area	2025 estimate	Change	2020 Census	Change	2010 Census
1	Indianapolis–Carmel–Greenwood, IN MSA	2,205,695	+5.55%	2,089,673	+12.00%	1,865,850
2	Chicago–Naperville–Elgin, IL-IN MSA (IN)	728,743	+1.40%	718,663	+1.50%	708,070
3	Fort Wayne, IN MSA	466,258	+4.13%	447,781	+7.57%	416,257
4	Louisville/Jefferson County, KY-IN MSA (IN)	281,424	+4.46%	269,413	+6.73%	252,436
5	South Bend–Mishawaka, IN-MI MSA (IN)	272,861	−0.02%	272,912	+2.24%	266,931
6	Evansville, IN MSA	273,786	+1.68%	269,256	+1.49%	265,302
7	Lafayette–West Lafayette, IN MSA	228,468	+2.12%	223,716	+6.38%	210,297
8	Elkhart–Goshen, IN MSA	208,774	+0.83%	207,047	+4.80%	197,559
9	Terre Haute, IN MSA	169,241	+0.22%	168,875	−2.06%	172,425
10	Bloomington, IN MSA	165,231	+2.60%	161,039	+0.93%	159,549
11	Muncie, IN MSA	113,106	+1.08%	111,903	−4.90%	117,671
12	Michigan City–La Porte, IN MSA	111,294	−1.00%	112,417	+0.85%	111,467
13	Columbus, IN MSA	85,729	+4.28%	82,208	+7.05%	76,794
14	Kokomo, IN MSA	83,904	+0.29%	83,658	+1.09%	82,752
15	Warsaw, IN μSA	80,892	+0.81%	80,240	+3.73%	77,358
16	Cincinnati, OH-KY-IN MSA (IN)	80,889	+1.87%	79,404	+0.18%	79,262
17	Marion, IN μSA	66,524	−0.22%	66,674	−4.83%	70,061
18	Richmond, IN μSA	66,169	−0.58%	66,553	−3.43%	68,917
19	New Castle, IN μSA	49,137	+0.46%	48,914	−1.11%	49,462
20	Kendallville, IN μSA	47,937	+1.01%	47,457	−0.17%	47,536
21	Seymour, IN μSA	47,370	+2.03%	46,428	+9.56%	42,376
22	Plymouth, IN μSA	46,599	+1.09%	46,095	−2.03%	47,051
23	Bedford, IN μSA	45,568	+1.24%	45,011	−2.43%	46,134
24	Auburn, IN μSA	44,535	+2.94%	43,265	+2.47%	42,223
25	Jasper, IN μSA	44,016	+0.87%	43,637	+4.17%	41,889
26	Crawfordsville, IN μSA	38,954	+2.68%	37,936	−0.49%	38,124
27	Greencastle, IN μSA	37,876	+3.13%	36,726	−3.26%	37,963
28	Logansport, IN μSA	37,836	−0.09%	37,870	−2.81%	38,966
29	Huntington, IN μSA	37,224	+1.53%	36,662	−1.24%	37,124
30	Decatur, IN μSA	36,650	+2.35%	35,809	+4.14%	34,387
31	Vincennes, IN μSA	35,652	−1.74%	36,282	−5.61%	38,440
32	Angola, IN μSA	34,799	+1.06%	34,435	+0.73%	34,185
33	Peru, IN μSA	34,487	−4.10%	35,962	−2.55%	36,903
34	Washington, IN μSA	34,209	+2.48%	33,381	+5.48%	31,648
35	Frankfort, IN μSA	33,322	+0.40%	33,190	−0.10%	33,224
36	Madison, IN μSA	33,279	+0.40%	33,147	+2.22%	32,428
37	Wabash, IN μSA	30,713	−0.85%	30,976	−5.81%	32,888
38	Greensburg, IN μSA	26,576	+0.39%	26,472	+2.84%	25,740
39	Monticello, IN μSA	25,164	+1.93%	24,688	+0.18%	24,643
40	Connersville, IN μSA	23,533	+0.58%	23,398	−3.62%	24,277
	Chicago–Naperville–Elgin, IL-IN MSA	9,434,123	−0.16%	9,449,351	+1.66%	9,294,679
	Cincinnati, OH-KY-IN MSA	2,312,858	+2.80%	2,249,797	+5.62%	2,130,151
	Louisville/Jefferson County, KY-IN MSA	1,402,509	+2.96%	1,362,180	+6.86%	1,274,757
	South Bend–Mishawaka, IN-MI MSA	324,528	+0.01%	324,501	+1.65%	319,224

The 10 combined statistical areas of the State of Indiana (Note: For CSAs comprising populations from multiple states, they are listed twice to show both their intrastate population within that CSA as well as the CSA's total population. Only the intrastate population is ranked.)
2025 rank	Combined statistical area	Population				
2025 rank	Combined statistical area	2025 estimate	Change	2020 Census	Change	2010 Census
1	Indianapolis–Carmel–Muncie, IN CSA	2,722,834	+4.73%	2,599,880	+9.53%	2,373,635
2	Chicago–Naperville, IL-IN-WI CSA (IN)	840,037	+1.08%	831,080	+1.41%	819,537
3	Fort Wayne–Huntington–Auburn, IN CSA	667,403	+3.41%	645,409	+5.51%	611,712
4	South Bend–Elkhart–Mishawaka, IN-MI CSA (IN)	609,126	+0.47%	606,294	+2.95%	588,899
5	Lafayette–West Lafayette–Frankfort, IN CSA	281,424	−0.06%	281,594	+5.01%	268,164
6	Louisville/Jefferson County–Elizabethtown, KY-IN CSA (IN)	274,487	+1.88%	269,413	+6.73%	252,436
7	Evansville–Henderson, IN-KY CSA (IN)	273,786	+1.68%	269,256	+1.49%	265,302
8	Bloomington–Bedford, IN CSA	210,799	+2.30%	206,050	+0.18%	205,683
9	Richmond–Connersville, IN CSA	89,702	−0.28%	89,951	−3.48%	93,194
10	Cincinnati–Wilmington, OH-KY-IN CSA (IN)	80,889	+1.87%	79,404	+0.18%	79,262
	Chicago–Naperville, IL-IN-WI CSA	9,965,292	−0.22%	9,986,960	+1.48%	9,840,929
	Cincinnati–Wilmington, OH-KY-IN CSA	2,355,159	+2.76%	2,291,815	+5.51%	2,172,191
	Evansville–Henderson, IN-KY CSA	330,970	+1.19%	327,066	+0.58%	325,173
	Louisville/Jefferson County–Elizabethtown, KY-IN CSA	1,531,175	+2.92%	1,487,749	+6.69%	1,394,493
	South Bend–Elkhart–Mishawaka, IN-MI CSA	813,247	+0.13%	812,199	+1.78%	798,005

== See also ==
- Geography of Indiana
  - Demographics of Indiana
