= Montgomery Township, Indiana =

Montgomery Township is the name of three townships in Indiana:

- Montgomery Township, Gibson County, Indiana
- Montgomery Township, Jennings County, Indiana
- Montgomery Township, Owen County, Indiana
