= Morgan Township, Indiana =

Morgan Township is the name of three townships in Indiana:

- Morgan Township, Harrison County, Indiana
- Morgan Township, Owen County, Indiana
- Morgan Township, Porter County, Indiana
