= Marion Mills, Indiana =

- Unincorporated community
- Location within Indiana Location within the United States
- Coordinates: 39°18′23″N 86°59′56″W
- Country: United States
- State: Indiana
- County: Owen
- Township: Marion
- Elevation: 690 ft (210 m)
- Time zone: UTC-5 (Eastern (EST))
  - Summer (DST): UTC-4 (EDT)
- ZIP code: 47427
- Area codes: 812, 930
- GNIS feature ID: 452129

Marion Mills is an unincorporated community in Marion Township, Owen County, in the U.S. state of Indiana.

== History ==
An old variant name of the community was called Hausertown. A post office was established under the Hausertown name in 1838, and remained in operation until it was discontinued in 1907. The community's present name was taken from Marion Township.

== Geography ==
Marion Mills is located at 39°18′23″N 86°59′56″W.
