= Lewisville, Owen County, Indiana =

Lewisville, Indiana
- Unincorporated Community
- Location within Indiana Location within the United States
- Coordinates: 39°28′16″N 86°37′55″W
- Country: United States
- State: Indiana
- County: Owen, Morgan
- Township: Harrison, Ashland
- Established: 1859
- Elevation: 774 ft (236 m)
- Time zone: UTC-5 (Eastern (EST))
  - Summer (DST): UTC-4 (EDT)
- ZIP code: 47456
- Area codes: 812, 930
- GNIS feature ID: 437808

Lewisville is an unincorporated community in the northeast corner of Harrison Township, Owen County, in the U.S. state of Indiana. It lies near the intersection of County Road 700 East (a.k.a. Drunkards Pike) and West Lewisville Road, which is a community about twenty miles northeast of the city of Spencer, the county seat. This community lies on the border of Owen County and Morgan County.

== History ==
The community was named in honor of a family of early settlers.

== Geography ==
- The Shenandoah Flying Field Airport is about five miles directly south of this community, and it is located on County Road 700 East (a.k.a. Drunkards Pike) just south of Watson Circle on the west bank of Butler Creek at 39°24′56″N 86°38′7″W (39.4155586 -86.6351400).
- The Ellis Lake Dam is about three miles directly south of this community, and it is located on Ellis Lake Road, just west of County Road 700 East (a.k.a. Drunkards Pike) at 39°26′24″N 86°38′24″W (39.4400466 -86.6400021).

== School districts ==
- Spencer-Owen Community Schools, including a high school.

== Political districts ==
- State House District 46
- State Senate District 39
