= Beamer, Indiana =

- Unincorporated community
- Location within Indiana Location within the United States
- Coordinates: 39°22′00″N 86°56′15″W
- Country: United States
- State: Indiana
- County: Owen
- Township: Morgan
- Elevation: 620 ft (189 m)
- Time zone: UTC-5 (Eastern (EST))
  - Summer (DST): UTC-4 (EDT)
- ZIP code: 47868
- Area codes: 812, 930
- GNIS feature ID: 446722

Beamer is an unincorporated community in Morgan Township, Owen County, in the U.S. state of Indiana.

== History ==
The population was 12 in 1930.
