= Braysville, Owen County, Indiana =

Braysville, Indiana
- Unincorporated Community
- Location within Indiana Location within the United States
- Coordinates: 39°12′42″N 86°46′28″W
- Country: United States
- State: Indiana
- County: Owen
- Township: Clay
- Established: 1859
- Elevation: 735 ft (224 m)
- Time zone: UTC-5 (Eastern (EST))
  - Summer (DST): UTC-4 (EDT)
- ZIP code: 47460
- Area codes: 812, 930
- GNIS feature ID: 431458

Braysville is an unincorporated community in the western part of Clay Township, Owen County, in the U.S. state of Indiana. It lies near the intersection of Freedom Road and Ranard Road, which is a community about six miles south of the city of Spencer, the county seat. Its elevation is 735 feet (224 m), and it is located at 39°12′42″N 86°46′28″W (39.2117117 -86.7744498).

== History ==
Braysville was founded in 1860 by Hiram Bray, and named for him.

== Geography ==
- Raccoon Creek is south of this community.

== School districts ==
- Spencer-Owen Community Schools, including a high school.

== Political districts ==
- State House District 46
- State Senate District 39
