= Cuba, Owen County, Indiana =

Cuba, Indiana
- Unincorporated community
- Location within Indiana Location within the United States
- Coordinates: 39°22′41″N 86°47′53″W
- Country: United States
- State: Indiana
- County: Owen
- Township: Montgomery
- Elevation: 840 ft (256 m)
- Time zone: UTC-5 (Eastern (EST))
  - Summer (DST): UTC-4 (EDT)
- ZIP code: 47460
- Area codes: 812, 930
- GNIS feature ID: 433235

Cuba is an unincorporated community in the northwestern part of Montgomery Township, Owen County, in the U.S. state of Indiana. It lies near the intersection of County Road 150 West (a.k.a. Keeler Road) and County Road 600 North (a.k.a. Hale Hill Road), which is a community about ten miles north of the town of Spencer, the county seat of Owen County. Its elevation is 722 feet (220 m), and it is located at 39°22′41″N 86°47′53″W (39.3781008 -86.7980628).

== History ==
Cuba was founded in 1851. A post office was established at Cuba in 1851, and remained in operation until it was discontinued in 1909.

== Geography ==
Kaufman Cemetery is about two miles west of this community, and it is located on Bandy Road west off of County Road 325 West (a.k.a. Rattlesnake Road) at 39°21′58″N 86°49′27″W (39.3661559 -86.8241745).

Cloyd Cemetery is about two miles southwest of this community, and it is located near the intersection of County Road 460 North (a.k.a. Clark Road) and County Road 325 West (a.k.a. Rattlesnake Road) at 39°21′43″N 86°48′53″W (39.3619893 -86.8147297).

== School districts ==
- Spencer-Owen Community Schools, including a high school.

== Political districts ==
- State House District 46
- State Senate District 39
