= Marion Township, Owen County, Indiana =

Marion Township
- Township
- Location in Owen County
- Coordinates: 39°18′19″N 86°59′58″W
- Country: United States
- State: Indiana
- County: Owen

Government
  - Type: Indiana township

Area
  - Total: 35.94 sq mi (93.1 km^{2})
  - Land: 35.87 sq mi (92.9 km^{2})
  - Water: 0.07 sq mi (0.18 km^{2}) 0.19%
- Elevation: 692 ft (211 m)

Population (2020)
  - Total: 922
  - Density: 25.7/sq mi (9.92/km^{2})
- ZIP codes: 47427, 47431, 47455, 47460, 47833, 47841
- GNIS feature ID: 453610

Marion Township is one of thirteen townships in Owen County, Indiana, United States. As of the 2020 census, its population was 922 (slightly up from 916 at 2010) and it contained 413 housing units.

== History ==
Marion Township was founded in 1835.

== Geography ==
According to the 2010 census, the township has a total area of 35.94 square miles (93.1 km^{2}), of which 35.87 square miles (92.9 km^{2}) (or 99.81%) is land and 0.07 square miles (0.18 km^{2}) (or 0.19%) is water.

=== Unincorporated towns ===
- Denmark at 39.269765°N 87.025845°W
- Marion Mills at 39.306432°N 86.9989°W
- Patricksburg at 39.315599°N 86.959177°W

(This list is based on USGS data and may include former settlements.)

=== Cemeteries ===
The township contains these eight cemeteries: Burger Cemetery, Humble Cemetery (an Indiana Pioneer Cemetery,) Marion Cemetery, Mast Cemetery, Rea Cemetery, Red Brush Cemetery, Stephens Cemetery and Steubenville Cemetery.

== School districts ==
- Spencer-Owen Community Schools

== Political districts ==
- US House District 8th
- State House District 46
- State Senate District 39
