= Ellis, Indiana =

- Unincorporated community
- Location within Indiana Location within the United States
- Coordinates: 39°03′49″N 87°13′22″W
- Country: United States
- State: Indiana
- County: Greene
- Township: Stockton
- Elevation: 545 ft (166 m)
- ZIP code: 47848
- FIPS code: 18-20818
- GNIS feature ID: 434104

Ellis is an unincorporated community in Stockton Township, Greene County, Indiana.

== History ==
Ellis was named in honor of William Ellis, a landowner.
