= Vilas, Indiana =

- Unincorporated community
- Location within Indiana Location within the United States
- Coordinates: 39°10′12″N 86°50′24″W
- Country: United States
- State: Indiana
- County: Owen
- Township: Franklin
- Elevation: 545 ft (166 m)
- Time zone: UTC-5 (Eastern (EST))
  - Summer (DST): UTC-4 (EDT)
- ZIP code: 47460
- Area codes: 812, 930
- GNIS feature ID: 445291

Vilas is an unincorporated community in Franklin Township, Owen County, in the U.S. state of Indiana.

== History ==
A post office was established at Vilas in 1885, and remained in operation until it was discontinued in 1912. The community was named in honor of William Freeman Vilas, 33rd United States Postmaster General.
