= Farmers, Indiana =

- Unincorporated Community
- Location within Indiana Location within the United States
- Coordinates: 39°10′31″N 86°53′30″W
- Country: United States
- State: Indiana
- County: Owen
- Township: Franklin
- Elevation: 590 ft (180 m)
- Time zone: UTC-5 (Eastern (EST))
  - Summer (DST): UTC-4 (EDT)
- ZIP code: 47427
- Area codes: 812, 930
- GNIS feature ID: 434398

Farmers is an unincorporated community in the southwest corner of Franklin Township, Owen County, in the U.S. state of Indiana. It lies just south of US Highway 231 at the intersection of 650 West, which is a community about twelve miles south of the city of Spencer, and only 6.6 miles from the town of Worthington. the county seat of Owen County. Its elevation is 591 feet (180 m), and it is located at 39°10′31″N 86°53′30″W (39.1753222 -86.8916741). This community is also known as Farmers Station.

== History ==
A post office was established as Farmers Station in 1869, renamed Farmers in 1882, and remained in operation until it was discontinued in 1931. Farmer was the surname of a town merchant.

== Geography ==
- This community is on the western banks of the White River.
- U.S. Route 231 is just north of this community.
- McIndoo Cemetery is in this community on Hickam Road, between the railroad tracks and the river, and is located at 39°10′36″N 86°52′28″W (39.1767112 -86.8744515).

== School districts ==
- Spencer-Owen Community Schools, including a high school.

== Political districts ==
- State House District 46
- State Senate District 39
