= Whitehall, Indiana =

- Unincorporated community
- Location within Indiana Location within the United States
- Coordinates: 39°10′27″N 86°41′04″W
- Country: United States
- State: Indiana
- County: Owen
- Township: Clay
- Elevation: 690 ft (210 m)
- Time zone: UTC-5 (Eastern (EST))
  - Summer (DST): UTC-4 (EDT)
- ZIP code: 47404
- Area codes: 812, 930
- GNIS feature ID: 449746

Whitehall is an unincorporated community in Clay Township, Owen County, in the U.S. state of Indiana.

== History ==
Whitehall was laid out in 1838 by James Brown, and named after a town in his native state of North Carolina. A post office was established at Whitehall in 1848, and remained in operation until it was discontinued in 1907.

== Geography ==
Whitehall is located at 39°10′27″N 86°41′04″W.
