= Jennings Township, Owen County, Indiana =

Jennings Township
- Township
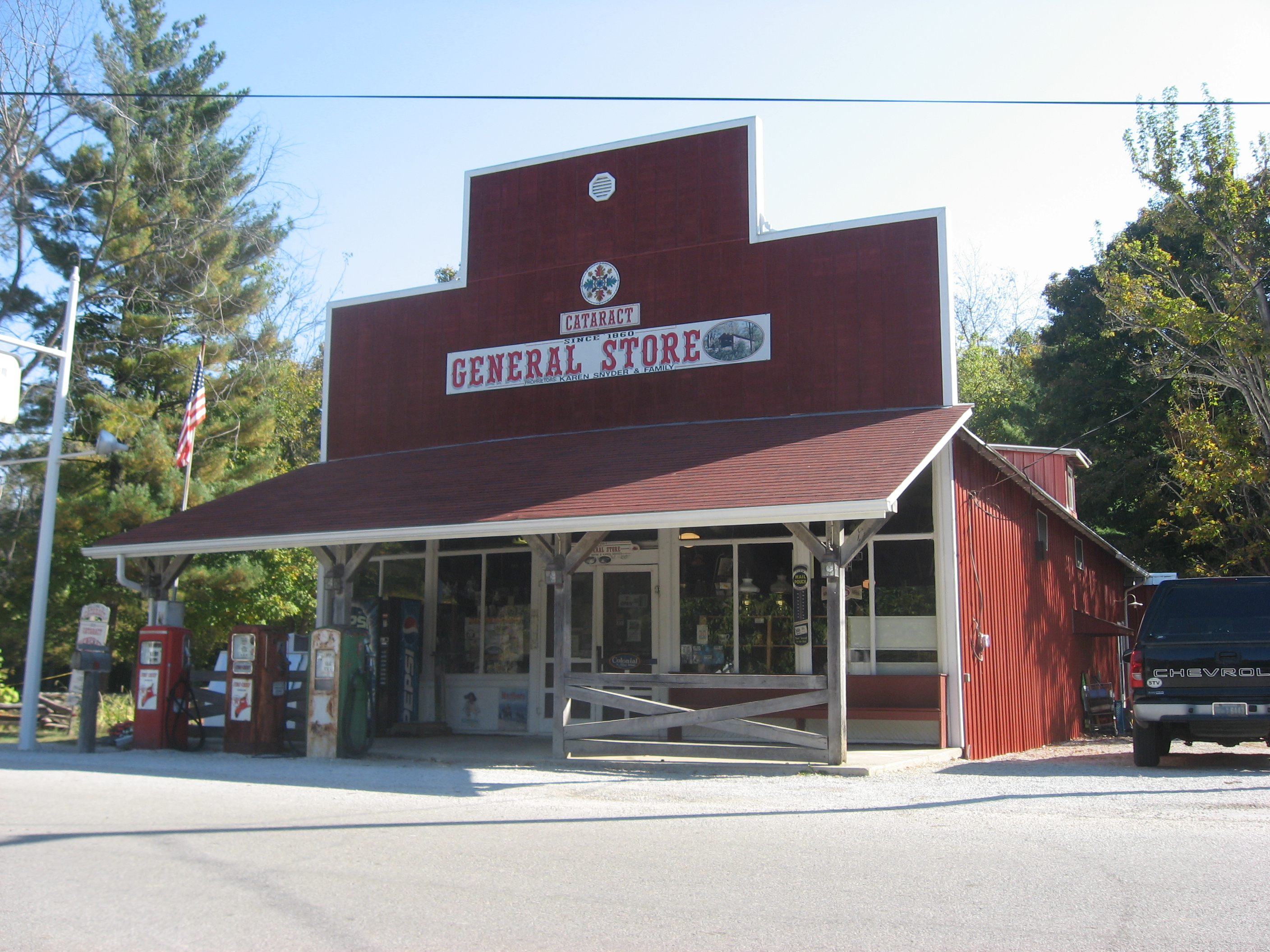
- General store in Cataract, within the township

- Location in Owen County
- Coordinates: 39°26′02″N 86°48′54″W
- Country: United States
- State: Indiana
- County: Owen

Government
  - Type: Indiana township

Area
  - Total: 20.06 sq mi (52.0 km^{2})
  - Land: 19.59 sq mi (50.7 km^{2})
  - Water: 0.47 sq mi (1.2 km^{2}) 2.34%
- Elevation: 751 ft (229 m)

Population (2020)
  - Total: 778
  - Density: 39.7/sq mi (15.3/km^{2})
- ZIP codes: 46120, 47460, 47868
- GNIS feature ID: 453508

Jennings Township is one of thirteen townships in Owen County, Indiana, United States. As of the 2020 census, its population was 778 (down from 846 at 2010) and it contained 380 housing units.

== History ==
Jennings Township was organized in 1842. It was named for T. C. Jennings, who played an active role in its establishment.

The Cataract Falls Covered Bridge was listed on the National Register of Historic Places in 2005.

== Geography ==
According to the 2010 census, the township has a total area of 20.06 square miles (52.0 km^{2}), of which 19.59 square miles (50.7 km^{2}) (or 97.66%) is land and 0.47 square miles (1.2 km^{2}) (or 2.34%) is water.

=== Unincorporated towns ===
- Cataract at 39.427545°N 86.816397°W

(This list is based on USGS data and may include former settlements.)

=== Cemeteries ===
The township contains Maze Cemetery.

=== Lakes ===
- Paradise Lake

== School districts ==
- Cloverdale Community Schools

== Political districts ==
- State House District 46
- State Senate District 37
