= Devore, Indiana =

- Unincorporated Community
- Location within Indiana Location within the United States
- Coordinates: 39°25′47″N 86°45′10″W
- Country: United States
- State: Indiana
- County: Owen
- Township: Taylor
- Elevation: 750 ft (230 m)
- Time zone: UTC-5 (Eastern (EST))
  - Summer (DST): UTC-4 (EDT)
- ZIP code: 47456
- Area codes: 812, 930
- GNIS feature ID: 433516

Devore is an unincorporated community in the southwest portion of Taylor Township, Owen County, in the U.S. state of Indiana. It lies just south of the intersection of County Road 1000 North and County Road 100 East (a.k.a. Tower Road and Devore Road), which is a community about ten miles north of the city of Spencer, the county seat of Owen County. Its elevation is 755 feet (230 m), and it is located at 39°25′47″N 86°45′10″W (39.4297683 -86.7527843). This community is also known as Mill Grove.

== History ==
Devore was originally called Mill Grove, and under the latter name was laid out in 1835. A post office opened under the Devore name in 1893, and remained in operation until it was discontinued in 1904.

== Geography ==
- Mill Creek flows just north of this community.
- U.S. Route 231 is just west of this community.

== School districts ==
- Cloverdale Community Schools.

== Political districts ==
- State House District 46
- State Senate District 39
