= Freeman, Indiana =

- Unincorporated Community
- Location within Indiana Location within the United States
- Coordinates: 39°11′43″N 86°44′1″W
- Country: United States
- State: Indiana
- County: Owen
- Township: Clay
- Established: 1859
- Elevation: 610 ft (186 m)
- Time zone: UTC-5 (Eastern (EST))
  - Summer (DST): UTC-4 (EDT)
- ZIP code: 47460
- Area codes: 812, 930
- GNIS feature ID: 434814

Freeman is an unincorporated community in the center of Clay Township, Owen County, in the U.S. state of Indiana. It lies near the intersection of County Road 650 South and Indiana Highway 43, which is a community nearly nine miles south of the city of Spencer, the county seat. Its elevation is 541 feet (165 m), and it is located at 39°11′44″N 86°44′1″W (39.1953233 -86.7336153).

== History ==
A post office was established at Freeman in 1866, and remained in operation until it was discontinued in 1915. The community was named after a family of settlers.

== Geography ==
- Raccoon Creek flows through this community.
- Brown Cemetery is about two miles south of this community, and it is located on State Ferry Road 39°10′17″N 86°43′41″W (39.1714346 -86.7280593).
- Livingston Cemetery is about a mile northeast this community, and it is located on County Road 225 East (aka Bittersweet Road) 39°11′54″N 86°43′16″W (39.1983788 -86.7211149).

== School districts ==
- Spencer-Owen Community Schools, which includes a high school.

== Political districts ==
- State House District 46
- State Senate District 39
