= Freedom, Indiana =

- Unincorporated town
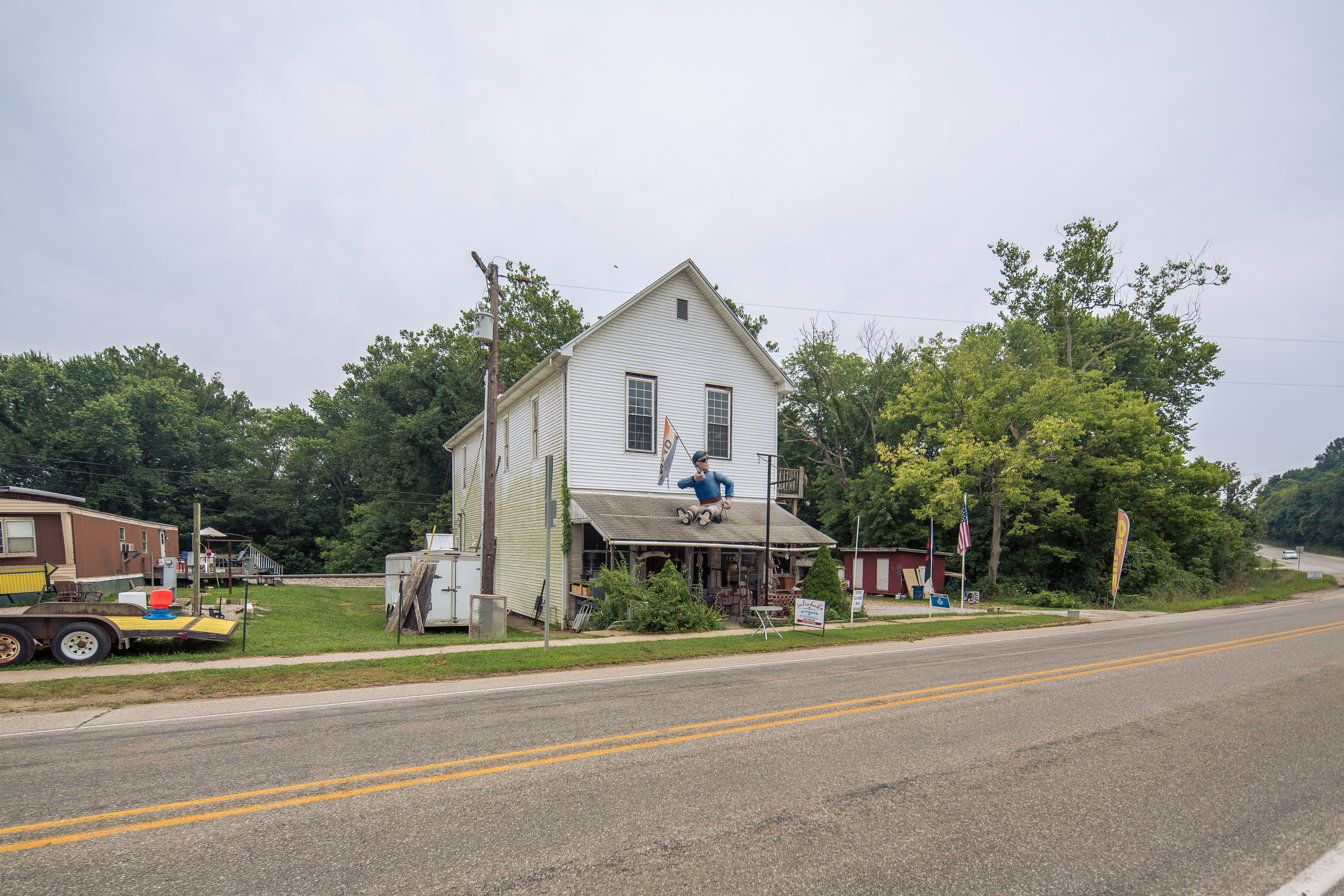

- Location within Indiana Location within the United States
- Coordinates: 39°12′25″N 86°52′9″W
- Country: United States
- State: Indiana
- County: Owen
- Township: Franklin
- Elevation: 538 ft (164 m)
- Time zone: UTC-5 (Eastern (EST))
  - Summer (DST): UTC-4 (EDT)
- ZIP code: 47431
- Area codes: 812, 930
- GNIS feature ID: 434803

Freedom is an unincorporated town in western Franklin Township, Owen County, Indiana. It lies along U.S. Route 231, southwest of the city of Spencer, the county seat of Owen County. It has a post office, with the ZIP code of 47431.

== History ==
Freedom was laid out in 1834, at which time it was an important shipping point of flatboats. The community's name is derived from Joseph Freeland, an early settler. A post office has been in operation at Freedom since 1834.

=== Notable people ===
- James Pierce – Freedom is the birthplace of one of the original Tarzan actors. Tarzan and the Golden Lion starred James Pierce, a native of Freedom, and an all-American football star at Indiana University. Though his role in this previously lost film would prove to be his largest on-screen, Pierce went on to play a permanent role in the Tarzan story off-camera. Tarzan creator Edgar Rice Burroughs, who had himself cast Pierce in the film, thought well enough of his ideal ape-man to introduce him to his daughter, whom Pierce subsequently married. James and Joan Burroughs Pierce went on to play Tarzan and Jane in 364 radio programs in the early 1930s and remained married until her death. They are buried next to one another in Shelbyville, Indiana in graves reading "Tarzan and Jane".
- Sammy L. Davis – U.S. Army Sergeant First Class Sammy L. Davis, Medal of Honor recipient of the Vietnam War, lives in Freedom. In early 2014, the State of Indiana honored Davis's great bravery and heroism by erecting two sets of highway memorial signs at the entrances of State Route 46 and U.S. Route 231 in Owen County, Indiana.
