= Atkinsonville, Indiana =

- Unincorporated community
- Location within Indiana Location within the United States
- Coordinates: 39°22′40″N 86°52′24″W
- Country: United States
- State: Indiana
- County: Owen
- Township: Morgan
- Elevation: 890 ft (270 m)
- Time zone: UTC-5 (Eastern (EST))
  - Summer (DST): UTC-4 (EDT)
- ZIP code: 47868
- Area codes: 812, 930
- GNIS feature ID: 430328

Atkinsonville is an unincorporated community in Morgan Township, Owen County, in the U.S. state of Indiana.

== History ==
Atkinsonville was platted in 1850, and named for its founder, Stephen Atkinson. A post office was established at Atkinsonville in 1854, and remained in operation until it was discontinued in 1907.

== Geography ==
Atkinsonville is located at 39°22′40″N 86°52′24″W.
