= Arney, Indiana =

- Unincorporated Community
- Location within Indiana Location within the United States
- Coordinates: 39°13′7″N 86°55′54″W
- Country: United States
- State: Indiana
- County: Owen
- Township: Jefferson
- Elevation: 705 ft (215 m)
- Time zone: UTC-5 (Eastern (EST))
  - Summer (DST): UTC-4 (EDT)
- ZIP code: 47431
- Area codes: 812, 930
- GNIS feature ID: 430270

Arney is an unincorporated community in eastern Jefferson Township, Owen County, in the U.S. state of Indiana. It lies near the intersection of County Road 880 West (a.k.a. Stubenville Road) and County Road 500 South (a.k.a. Arney Road), which is a community nearly ten miles southwest of the city of Spencer, the county seat of Owen County. Its elevation is 705 feet (215 m), and it is located at 39°13′7″N 86°55′54″W (39.2186546, -86.9316754).

== History ==
Arney was founded in 1852. A post office was established at Arney in 1856, and remained in operation until it was discontinued in 1912.
