= Romona, Indiana =

- Unincorporated community
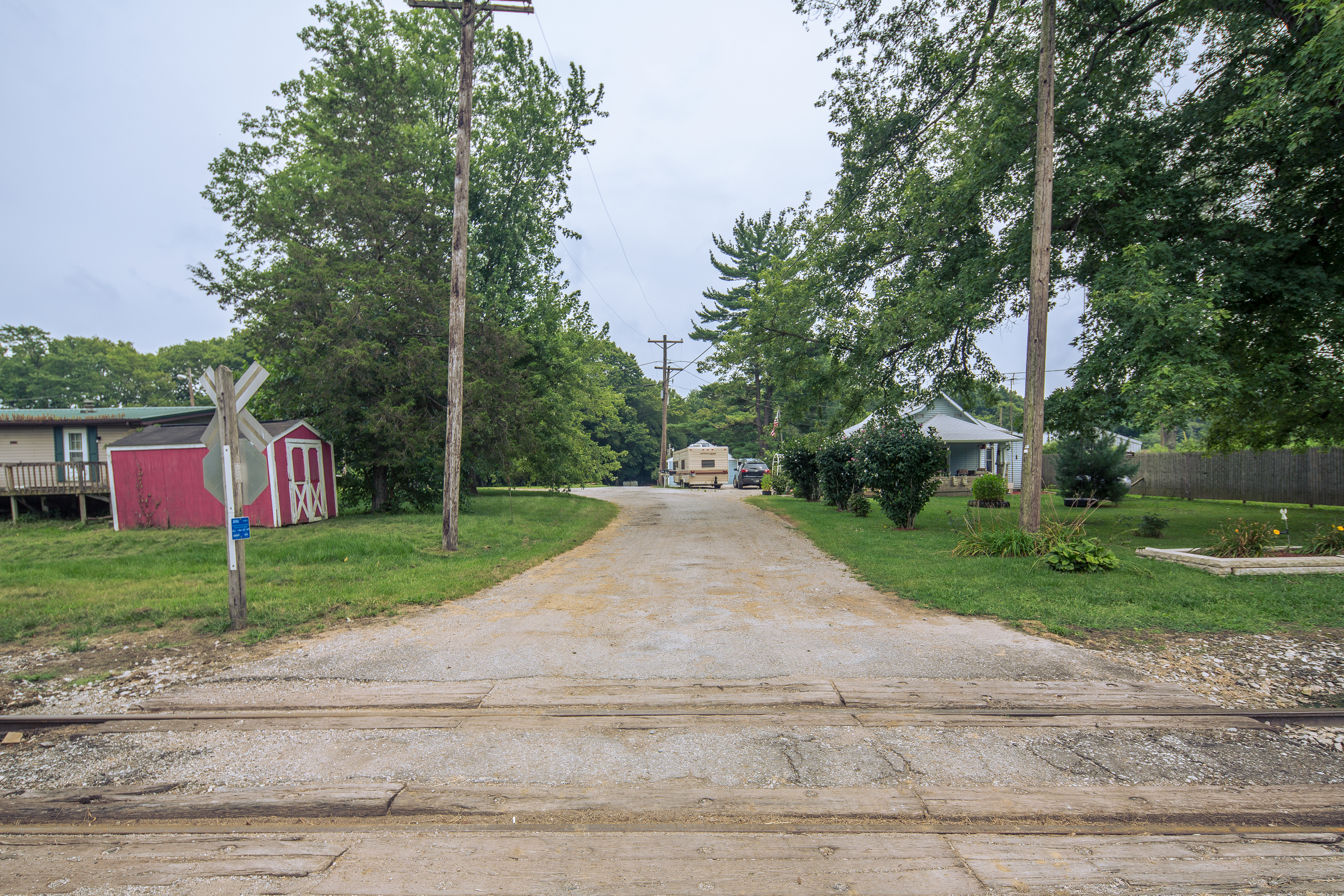

- Location within Indiana Location within the United States
- Coordinates: 39°19′38″N 86°43′48″W
- Country: United States
- State: Indiana
- County: Owen
- Township: Washington
- Elevation: 584 ft (178 m)
- Time zone: UTC-5 (Eastern (EST))
  - Summer (DST): UTC-4 (EDT)
- ZIP code: 47460
- Area codes: 812, 930
- GNIS feature ID: 442273

Romona is an unincorporated community in Washington Township, Owen County, in the U.S. state of Indiana.

== History ==
Romona was originally called Brintonville, and under the latter name was founded in 1819 by Adam Brinton. The name Romona was adopted in the 1880s, after the novel Ramona by Helen Hunt Jackson. A post office was established under the name Romona in 1886, and remained in operation until 1936.
