= Southport, Owen County, Indiana =

Southport, Indiana
- Unincorporated community
- Location within Indiana Location within the United States
- Coordinates: 39°16′37″N 86°45′42″W
- Country: United States
- State: Indiana
- County: Owen
- Township: Washington
- Elevation: 558 ft (170 m)
- Time zone: UTC-5 (Eastern (EST))
  - Summer (DST): UTC-4 (EDT)
- ZIP code: 47460
- Area codes: 812, 930
- GNIS feature ID: 443879

Southport is an unincorporated community in Washington Township, Owen County, in the U.S. state of Indiana.
