= Patricksburg, Indiana =

- Unincorporated community
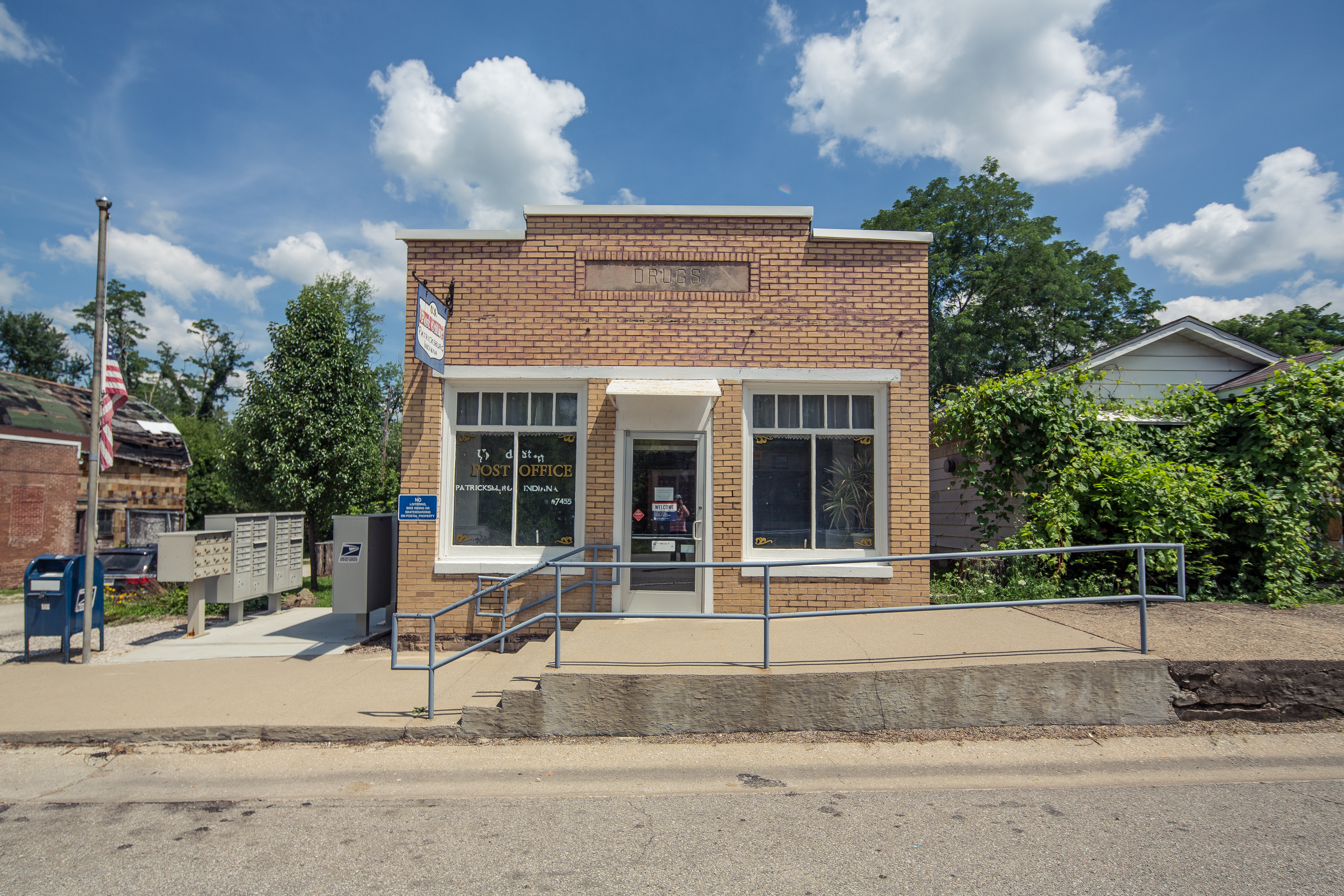

- Location within Indiana Location within the United States
- Coordinates: 39°18′56″N 86°57′3″W
- Country: United States
- State: Indiana
- County: Owen
- Township: Marion
- Elevation: 715 ft (218 m)
- Time zone: UTC-5 (Eastern (EST))
  - Summer (DST): UTC-4 (EDT)
- ZIP code: 47455
- Area codes: 812, 930
- GNIS feature ID: 440928

Patricksburg (also Lancaster) is an unincorporated community in eastern Marion Township, Owen County, in the U.S. state of Indiana. It lies along State Road 246, west of the city of Spencer, the county seat of Owen County. Its elevation is 715 feet (218 m), and it is located at 39°18′56″N 86°57′33″W (39.3155987, -86.9591770). Although Patricksburg is unincorporated, it has a post office, with the ZIP code of 47455.

== History ==
Patricksburg was originally called Lancaster, and under the latter name was laid out and platted in 1851 by Patrick Sullivan. A post office has been in operation under the name Patricksburg (formerly Patricksburgh) since 1854.

== Demographics ==
The United States Census Bureau defined Patricksburg as a census designated place in the 2022 American Community Survey.
