= Carp, Indiana =

- Unincorporated Community
- Location within Indiana Location within the United States
- Coordinates: 39°23′6″N 86°45′39″W
- Country: United States
- State: Indiana
- County: Owen
- Township: Montgomery

Government
  - Mayor: Jason Tritle
- Elevation: 720 ft (220 m)
- Time zone: UTC-5 (Eastern (EST))
  - Summer (DST): UTC-4 (EDT)
- ZIP code: 47460
- Area codes: 812, 930
- GNIS feature ID: 432160

Carp is an unincorporated community in the northeastern part of Montgomery Township, Owen County, in the U.S. state of Indiana. It lies near the intersection of US Highway 231 and County Road 50 East (a.k.a. Rocky Hill Road), which is a community nearly eight miles north of the city of Spencer, the county seat of Owen County. Its elevation is 722 feet (220 m), and it is located at 39°23′6″N 86°45′39″W (39.3850457, -86.7608397). The mayor of Carp, Indiana is Jason Tritle.

== History ==
A post office was established at Carp in 1885, and remained in operation until it was discontinued in 1904.
