= Franklin Township, Owen County, Indiana =

Franklin Township
- Township
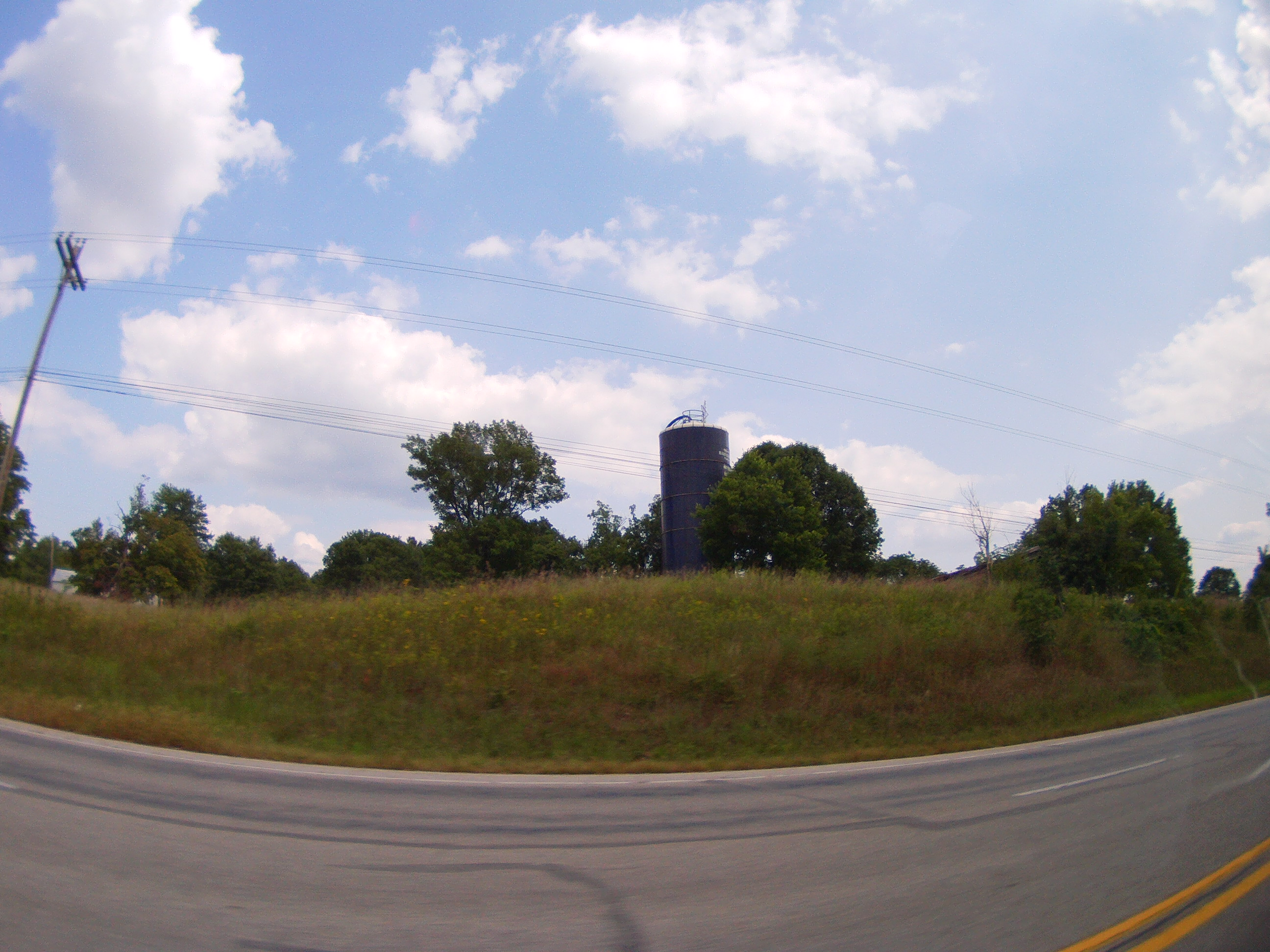
- Silo on a hill from U.S. 231 in Franklin Township

- Location in Owen County
- Coordinates: 39°12′38″N 86°51′01″W
- Country: United States
- State: Indiana
- County: Owen

Government
  - Type: Indiana township

Area
  - Total: 35.09 sq mi (90.9 km^{2})
  - Land: 35.09 sq mi (90.9 km^{2})
  - Water: 0 sq mi (0 km^{2}) 0%
- Elevation: 633 ft (193 m)

Population (2020)
  - Total: 1,294
  - Density: 36.88/sq mi (14.24/km^{2})
- ZIP codes: 47431, 47460, 47471
- GNIS feature ID: 453310

Franklin Township is one of thirteen townships in Owen County, Indiana, United States. As of the 2020 census, its population was 1,294 (slightly up from 1,269 at 2010) and it contained 550 housing units.

== History ==
Franklin Township was founded in 1819.

== Geography ==
According to the 2010 census, the township has a total area of 35.09 square miles (90.9 km^{2}), all land.

=== Unincorporated towns ===
- Adel at 39.191989°N 86.795839°W
- Farmers at 39.175322°N 86.891674°W
- Freedom at 39.206989°N 86.869174°W
- Pottersville at 39.207267°N 86.814173°W
- Vilas at 39.170045°N 86.840006°W

(This list is based on USGS data and may include former settlements.)

=== Cemeteries ===
The township contains these eighteen cemeteries: Adel, Burkett, Burton, Camden, Defore, Franklin, Hicks, Leach, Light, McIndoo, McKee, Neeley, Oliphant, Pryor, Scott, Waker, White and White.

=== Major highways ===
- U.S. Route 231
- Indiana State Road 67

== School districts ==
- Spencer-Owen Community Schools

== Political districts ==
- State House District 46
- State Senate District 39
