= Owen County, Indiana =

County in Indiana, United States

- County
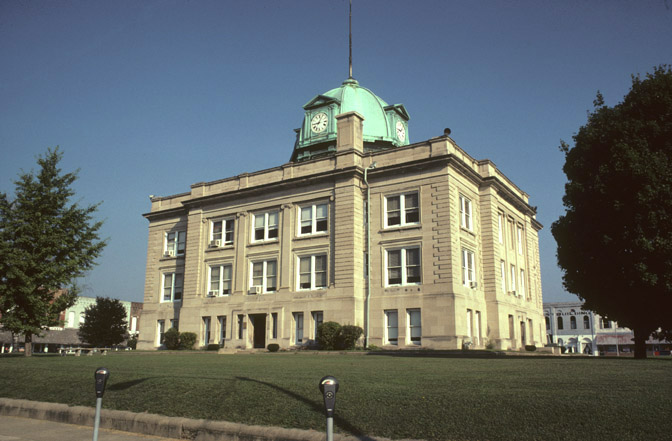
- Owen County Courthouse in Spencer, Indiana

- Seal

- Location within the U.S. state of Indiana
- Coordinates: 39°19′N 86°50′W
- Country: United States
- State: Indiana
- Founded: December 21, 1818 (authorized); 1819 (organized)
- Named for: Abraham Owen
- Seat: Spencer
- Largest town: Spencer

Area
  - Total: 387.82 sq mi (1,004.4 km^{2})
  - Land: 385.29 sq mi (997.9 km^{2})
  - Water: 2.54 sq mi (6.6 km^{2}) 0.65%

Population (2020)
  - Total: 21,321
  - Estimate (2025): 21,886 ▲
  - Density: 55.338/sq mi (21.366/km^{2})
- Time zone: UTC−5 (Eastern)
  - Summer (DST): UTC−4 (EDT)
- Congressional district: 8th
- Website: owencounty.in.gov
- Indiana county number 60

Owen County is a county in the U.S. state of Indiana. In 1920 the United States Census Bureau calculated the mean center of U.S. population to fall within this county. As of the 2020 United States census, it had a population of 21,321. Its county seat is Spencer. Owen County is part of the Bloomington, Indiana metropolitan area.

== History ==
In 1787, the fledgling United States defined the Northwest Territory, which included the area of present-day Indiana. In 1800, Congress separated Ohio from the Northwest Territory, designating the rest of the land as the Indiana Territory. President Thomas Jefferson chose William Henry Harrison as the territory's first governor, and Vincennes was established as the territorial capital. After the Michigan Territory was separated and the Illinois Territory was formed, Indiana was reduced to its current size and geography. By December 1816 the Indiana Territory was admitted to the Union as a state.

Starting in 1794, Native American titles to Indiana lands were extinguished by usurpation, purchase, or war and treaty. The United States acquired land from the Native Americans in the 1809 treaty of Fort Wayne, and by the treaty of St. Mary's in 1818 considerably more territory became property of the government. This included the future Owen County. White settlers had been moving into the future Owen County area since 1816.

The area in present-day Owen County was first placed under local jurisdiction in 1790, when Knox County was created. This all-encompassing county was repeatedly subdivided as its lands were occupied − in 1816 a portion was partitioned to create Sullivan County, and on February 2, 1818, another area to the south was partitioned to create Daviess County. That same winter (December 21, 1818) the state legislature took portions from northern Daviess and eastern Sullivan to create Owen County; it was named for Abraham Owen, a colonel in the US Army who had died at the Battle of Tippecanoe in 1811. The boundaries of this new county were reduced in 1822 when Putnam and in 1825 when Clay counties were created.

The first moves to organize the county's government were completed in 1819. In 1820 the first commissioners selected Spencer, the county's largest settlement, as its seat of government.

In 1920, the United States census reported Owen County as the Center of Population for the US at a point 8 miles south-southeast of Spencer, Indiana. The center moved the shortest distance since census data collecting began in 1790 (just under 10 miles) from its previous center in Bloomington, Indiana. When the East experienced high rates of growth, as it did in the decades between 1890 and 1920, the Westward movement of the center slowed.

== Geography ==
Owen County's low hills were completely wooded before the nineteenth century. It is still largely tree-covered, but significant portions have been cleared and are dedicated to agriculture or urban use. Its highest point (934 feet/285 meters ASL) is a steep point 2.0 miles (3.2 km) south of Quincy. The White River flows southwestward through the lower central part, entering from Monroe County (its course delineates a portion of the border between Monroe and Owen counties), then continues its journey into Greene County.

According to the 2010 United States census, the county has a total area of 387.82 square miles (1,004.4 km^{2}), of which 385.29 square miles (997.9 km^{2}) (or 99.35%) is land and 2.54 square miles (6.6 km^{2}) (or 0.65%) is water.

=== Adjacent counties ===
- Putnam County - north
- Morgan County - northeast
- Monroe County - southeast
- Greene County - south
- Clay County - west

=== Major highways ===
- U.S. Route 231
- Indiana State Road 42
- Indiana State Road 43
- Indiana State Road 46
- Indiana State Road 67
- Indiana State Road 157
- Indiana State Road 243
- Indiana State Road 246

=== Protected areas ===
- Cataract Falls State Recreation Area
- McCormick's Creek State Park - the state's first park (1916)
- Owen-Putnam State Forest (part)

=== Towns ===
- Gosport
- Spencer (county seat)

== Unincorporated communities ==
- Adel
- Alaska
- Arney
- Atkinsonville
- Beamer
- Braysville
- Carp
- Cataract
- Coal City
- Cuba
- Cunot
- Daggett
- Denmark
- Devore
- Farmers
- Freedom
- Freeman
- Highets Corner
- Jordan
- Lewisville
- Marion Mills
- New Hope
- Patricksburg
- Pottersville
- Quincy
- Romona
- Southport
- Stockton
- Vandalia
- Vilas
- Wallace Junction (ghost town)
- Whitehall

== Townships ==
- Clay
- Franklin
- Harrison
- Jackson
- Jefferson
- Jennings
- Lafayette
- Marion
- Montgomery
- Morgan
- Taylor
- Washington
- Wayne

== Climate and weather ==
Spencer, Indiana

Climate chart (precipitation, max. and min. temperature)
J	F	M	A	M	J	J	A	S	O	N	D
2.6 34 15	2.6 40 19	3.7 51 28	4.5 62 37	5 72 47	4.7 81 57	4.6 84 61	4.5 82 59	3.3 76 50	3.2 65 38	4.1 52 30	3.3 40 21
- █ Average max. and min. temperatures in °F
- █ Precipitation totals in inches
- Source: The Weather Channel
Metric conversion
J	F	M	A	M	J	J	A	S	O	N	D
65 1 −9	66 4 −7	95 11 −2	113 17 3	126 22 8	118 27 14	118 29 16	115 28 15	83 24 10	80 18 3	103 11 −1	84 4 −6
- █ Average max. and min. temperatures in °C
- █ Precipitation totals in mm

In recent years, average temperatures in Spencer have ranged from a low of 15 °F (−9 °C) in January to a high of 84 °F (29 °C) in July, although a record low of −33 °F (−36 °C) was recorded in January 1994 and a record high of 107 °F (42 °C) was recorded in July 1954. Average monthly precipitation ranged from 2.56 inches (65 mm) in January to 4.97 inches (126 mm) in May.

== Government ==
The county government is a constitutional body, and is granted specific powers by the Constitution of Indiana, and by the Indiana Code.

County Council: The fiscal body of the county government, consisting of seven members. Three are elected county-wide (at-large members) and four are elected from districts. District One includes Harrison, Montgomery, Taylor, and Wayne Townships including the Town of Gosport. District Two includes Washington Township including the Town of Spencer. District Three includes Jackson, Jennings, Lafayette, and Morgan Townships. District Four includes Clay, Franklin, Jefferson, and Marion Townships. All council members serve four-year terms with at-large members elected during Presidential election cycles and district members elected during the other election cycles. One council member serves as president and another as vice-president. The council sets salaries, the annual budget, and special spending. The council has limited authority to impose local taxes, in the form of an income and property tax that is subject to state level approval, excise taxes, and service taxes. Several local boards such as the Alcoholic Beverage Board and Library Board have a member or members appointed by the council.

Board of Commissioners: The executive body of the county; its three members are elected county-wide to four-year terms, however each must reside in their respective districts, two of which are elected during Presidential election cycles and the other during the other election cycles. Each serves a four-year term. The District One member must reside in Harrison, Jackson, Jennings, Montgomery, Taylor, or Wayne Townships. The District Two member must reside in Clay, Franklin, or Washington Townships. The District Three member must reside in Jefferson, Lafayette, Marion, or Morgan Townships. One commissioner serves as president and another as vice-president. Commissioners execute acts legislated by the council, collect revenue, and manage the county government.

Court: The county has a Circuit Court. The judge on the court is elected to a term of six years and must be a member of the Indiana Bar Association.

County Officials: The county has other elected offices, including sheriff, coroner, prosecutor, assessor, auditor, treasurer, recorder, surveyor and clerk of the circuit court. These officers are elected to four-year terms. Members elected to county government positions are required to declare party affiliations and to be residents of the county.

United States presidential election results for Owen County, Indiana
Year	Republican		Democratic		Third party(ies)	
Year	No.	%	No.	%	No.	%
1888	1,632	45.08%	1,918	52.98%	70	1.93%
1892	1,569	43.51%	1,738	48.20%	299	8.29%
1896	1,751	45.45%	2,070	53.72%	32	0.83%
1900	1,706	44.28%	2,057	53.39%	90	2.34%
1904	1,721	46.26%	1,841	49.49%	158	4.25%
1908	1,726	44.53%	2,023	52.19%	127	3.28%
1912	711	21.19%	1,621	48.32%	1,023	30.49%
1916	1,585	44.67%	1,812	51.07%	151	4.26%
1920	2,997	49.18%	2,948	48.38%	149	2.45%
1924	2,627	47.41%	2,670	48.19%	244	4.40%
1928	3,036	55.03%	2,420	43.86%	61	1.11%
1932	2,423	38.86%	3,639	58.35%	174	2.79%
1936	3,091	46.50%	3,498	52.62%	59	0.89%
1940	3,709	54.00%	3,121	45.44%	38	0.55%
1944	3,318	55.53%	2,602	43.55%	55	0.92%
1948	3,002	51.14%	2,738	46.64%	130	2.21%
1952	3,713	58.37%	2,577	40.51%	71	1.12%
1956	3,685	58.48%	2,581	40.96%	35	0.56%
1960	3,700	60.38%	2,379	38.82%	49	0.80%
1964	2,788	45.26%	3,339	54.20%	33	0.54%
1968	2,898	51.58%	1,932	34.39%	788	14.03%
1972	3,896	69.25%	1,708	30.36%	22	0.39%
1976	2,896	47.83%	3,103	51.25%	56	0.92%
1980	3,632	58.47%	2,325	37.43%	255	4.10%
1984	4,204	66.49%	2,082	32.93%	37	0.59%
1988	3,837	60.30%	2,484	39.04%	42	0.66%
1992	2,753	42.00%	2,207	33.67%	1,595	24.33%
1996	3,056	48.77%	2,244	35.81%	966	15.42%
2000	4,019	61.80%	2,253	34.65%	231	3.55%
2004	5,000	65.75%	2,536	33.35%	68	0.89%
2008	4,415	54.04%	3,570	43.70%	185	2.26%
2012	5,062	62.39%	2,823	34.80%	228	2.81%
2016	6,153	71.41%	1,946	22.59%	517	6.00%
2020	7,286	73.47%	2,420	24.40%	211	2.13%
2024	7,360	74.52%	2,354	23.84%	162	1.64%

== Demographics ==
=== Racial and ethnic composition ===
Owen County, Indiana – Racial and ethnic composition Note: the US Census treats Hispanic/Latino as an ethnic category. This table excludes Latinos from the racial categories and assigns them to a separate category. Hispanics/Latinos may be of any race.
Race / Ethnicity (NH = Non-Hispanic)	Pop 1980	Pop 1990	Pop 2000	Pop 2010	Pop 2020	% 1980	% 1990	% 2000	% 2010	% 2020
White alone (NH)	15,677	17,120	21,291	20,983	19,874	98.96%	99.07%	97.73%	97.26%	93.21%
Black or African American alone (NH)	38	44	52	65	79	0.24%	0.25%	0.24%	0.30%	0.37%
Native American or Alaska Native alone (NH)	39	45	73	72	47	0.25%	0.26%	0.34%	0.33%	0.22%
Asian alone (NH)	26	17	33	65	62	0.16%	0.10%	0.15%	0.30%	0.29%
Native Hawaiian or Pacific Islander alone (NH)	x	x	3	1	0	x	x	0.01%	0.00%	0.00%
Other race alone (NH)	0	0	15	14	50	0.00%	0.00%	0.07%	0.06%	0.23%
Mixed race or Multiracial (NH)	x	x	155	177	912	x	x	0.71%	0.82%	4.28%
Hispanic or Latino (any race)	61	55	164	198	297	0.39%	0.32%	0.75%	0.92%	1.39%
Total	15,841	17,281	21,786	21,575	21,321	100.00%	100.00%	100.00%	100.00%	100.00%

=== 2020 census ===
As of the 2020 census, the county had a population of 21,321. The median age was 45.1 years. 21.2% of residents were under the age of 18 and 20.4% of residents were 65 years of age or older. For every 100 females there were 102.2 males, and for every 100 females age 18 and over there were 101.5 males age 18 and over.

The racial makeup of the county was 93.6% White, 0.4% Black or African American, 0.2% American Indian and Alaska Native, 0.3% Asian, <0.1% Native Hawaiian and Pacific Islander, 0.5% from some other race, and 4.9% from two or more races. Hispanic or Latino residents of any race comprised 1.4% of the population.

<0.1% of residents lived in urban areas, while 100.0% lived in rural areas.

There were 8,645 households in the county, of which 27.1% had children under the age of 18 living in them. Of all households, 51.7% were married-couple households, 19.1% were households with a male householder and no spouse or partner present, and 21.1% were households with a female householder and no spouse or partner present. About 26.9% of all households were made up of individuals and 12.7% had someone living alone who was 65 years of age or older.

There were 9,795 housing units, of which 11.7% were vacant. Among occupied housing units, 80.4% were owner-occupied and 19.6% were renter-occupied. The homeowner vacancy rate was 1.5% and the rental vacancy rate was 5.9%.

=== Historical population ===
Historical population
Census	Pop.	Note	%±
1820	838		—
1830	4,017		379.4%
1840	8,359		108.1%
1850	12,106		44.8%
1860	14,376		18.8%
1870	16,137		12.2%
1880	15,901		−1.5%
1890	15,040		−5.4%
1900	15,149		0.7%
1910	14,053		−7.2%
1920	12,760		−9.2%
1930	11,351		−11.0%
1940	12,090		6.5%
1950	11,763		−2.7%
1960	11,400		−3.1%
1970	12,163		6.7%
1980	15,841		30.2%
1990	17,281		9.1%
2000	21,786		26.1%
2010	21,575		−1.0%
2020	21,321		−1.2%
2025 (est.)	21,886	▲	2.6%
US Decennial Census; 1790-1960 1900-1990; 1990-2000 2010

== 2010 census ==
As of the 2010 United States census, there were 21,575 people, 8,486 households, and 5,992 families in the county. The population density was 56.0 inhabitants per square mile (21.6/km^{2}). There were 10,091 housing units at an average density of 26.2 per square mile (10.1/km^{2}). The racial makeup of the county was 97.9% white, 0.3% Asian, 0.3% American Indian, 0.3% black or African American, 0.2% from other races, and 0.9% from two or more races. Those of Hispanic or Latino origin made up 0.9% of the population. In terms of ancestry, 28.7% were German, 20.7% were Irish, 8.9% were English, and 8.4% were American.

Of the 8,486 households, 31.0% had children under the age of 18 living with them, 56.1% were married couples living together, 9.2% had a female householder with no husband present, 29.4% were non-families, and 24.0% of all households were made up of individuals. The average household size was 2.52 and the average family size was 2.96. The median age was 42.4 years.

The median income for a household in the county was $47,697 and the median income for a family was $52,343. Males had a median income of $40,668 versus $30,556 for females. The per capita income for the county was $20,581. About 9.2% of families and 12.4% of the population were below the poverty line, including 17.8% of those under age 18 and 8.1% of those age 65 or over.<ref">"Selected Economic Characteristics – 2006-2010 American Community Survey 5-Year Estimates". US Census Bureau.</ref>

== See also ==
- National Register of Historic Places listings in Owen County, Indiana
