= Jordan, Owen County, Indiana =

Jordan
- Unincorporated community
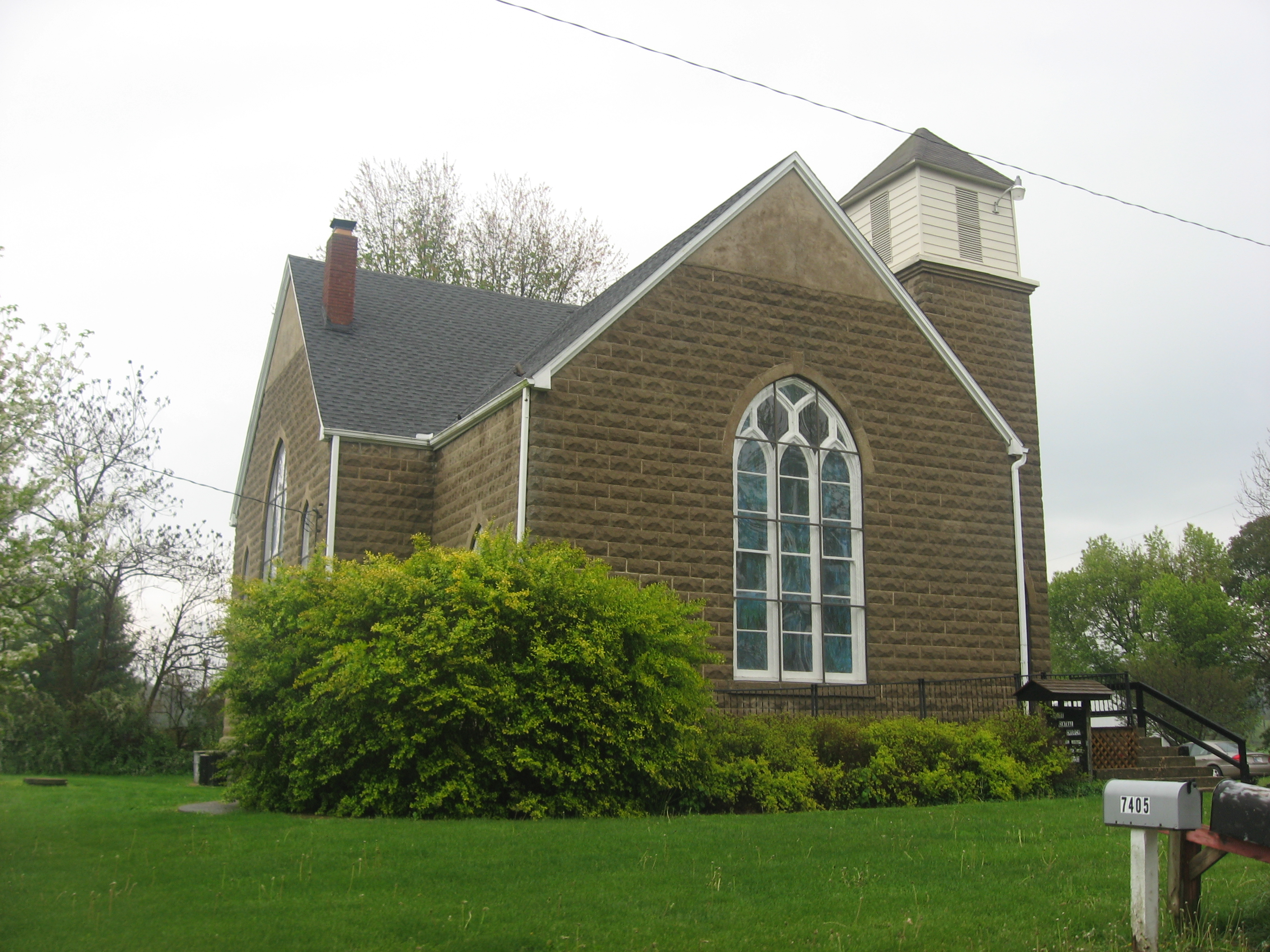
- The former Jordan United Presbyterian Church

- Location within Indiana Location within the United States
- Coordinates: 39°23′54″N 86°55′00″W
- Country: United States
- State: Indiana
- County: Owen
- Township: Morgan
- Elevation: 653 ft (199 m)
- Time zone: UTC-5 (Eastern (EST))
  - Summer (DST): UTC-4 (EDT)
- ZIP code: 47868
- Area codes: 812, 930
- GNIS feature ID: 437109

Jordan is an unincorporated community in Morgan Township, Owen County, in the U.S. state of Indiana.

== History ==
An old variant name is Jordan Village. A post office was established under the name Jordan Village in 1854, and remained in operation until 1922. According to Ronald L. Baker, the community was probably named after the Jordan family of settlers. An older volume of local history states the nearby Jordan Creek was named after the Jordan River in West Asia.

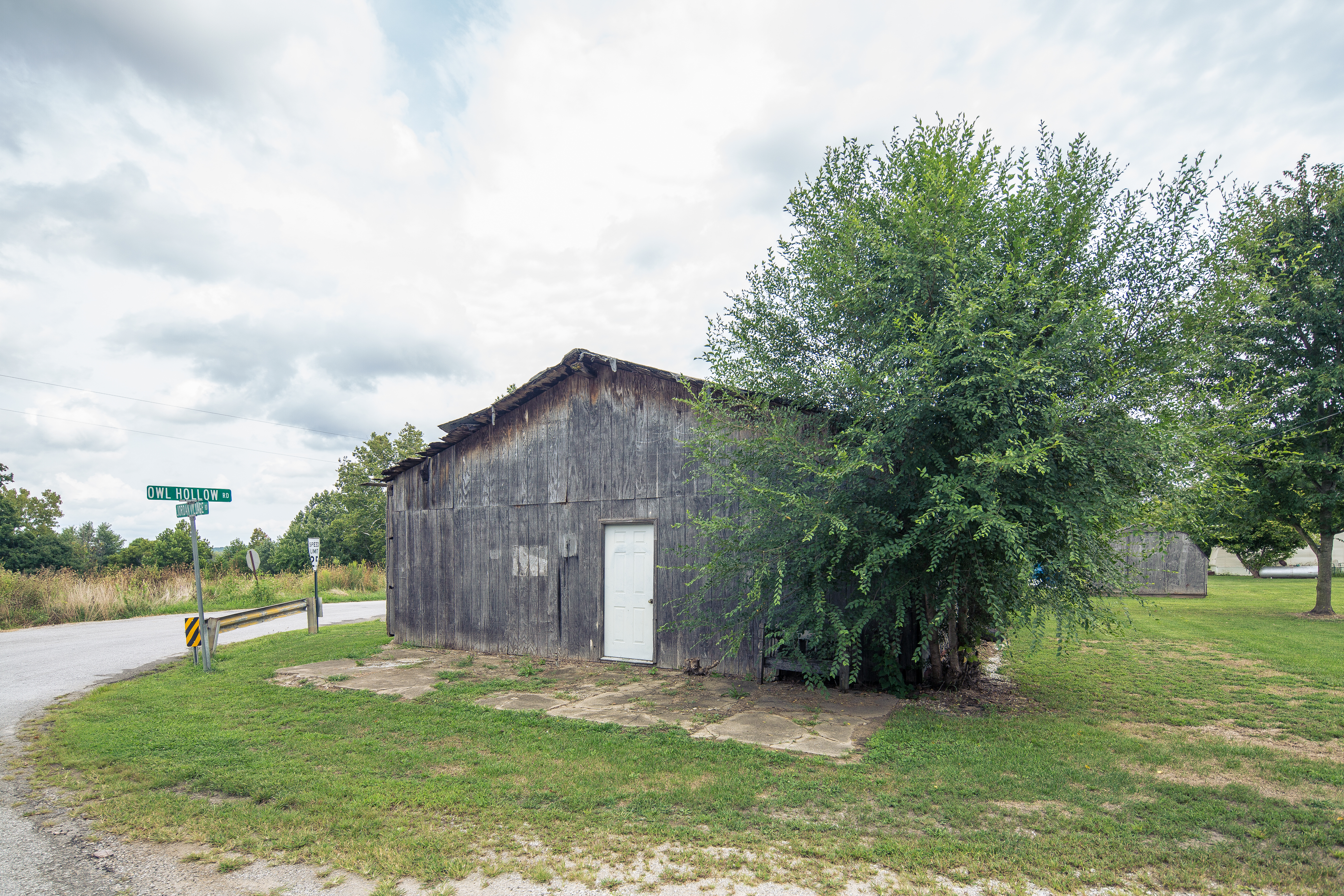
Photo from Small Town Indiana photo survey.

== Geography ==
Jordan is located at 39°23′54″N 86°55′00″W at an elevation of 653 feet.
