= Wallace Junction, Indiana =

- Ghost town
- Location within Indiana Location within the United States
- Coordinates: 39°27′49″N 86°43′37″W
- Country: United States
- State: Indiana
- County: Owen
- Township: Taylor
- Elevation: 771 ft (235 m)
- Time zone: UTC-5 (Eastern (EST))
  - Summer (DST): UTC-4 (EDT)
- ZIP code: 47456
- Area codes: 812, 930
- GNIS feature ID: 445394

Wallace Junction is a ghost town in Taylor Township, Owen County, in the U.S. state of Indiana.

== Geography ==
Wallace Junction is located at 39°27′49″N 86°43′37″W.
