= Taylor Township, Owen County, Indiana =

Taylor Township
- Township
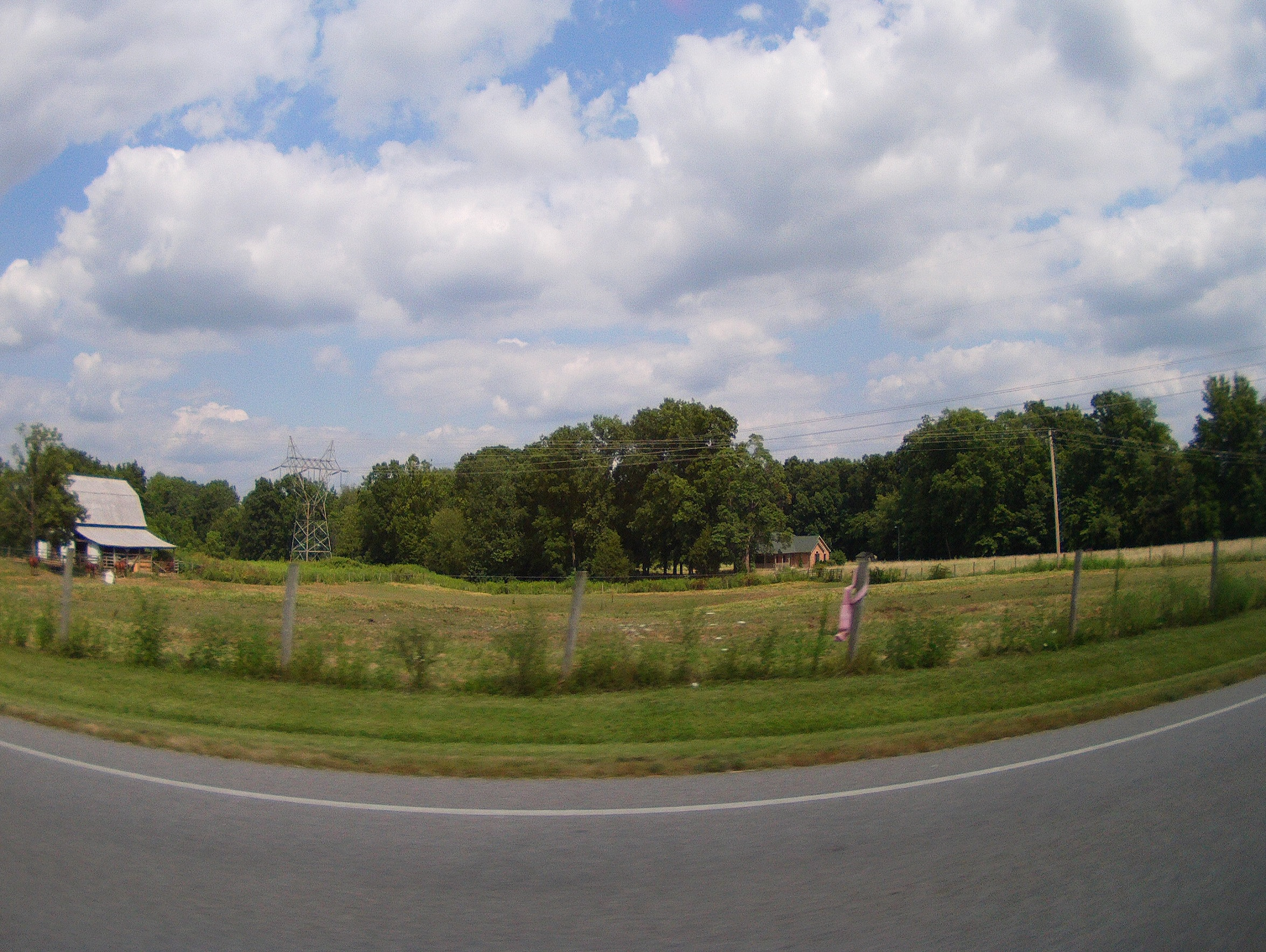
- Countryside in Taylor Township

- Location in Owen County
- Coordinates: 39°25′59″N 86°44′39″W
- Country: United States
- State: Indiana
- County: Owen

Government
  - Type: Indiana township

Area
  - Total: 19.87 sq mi (51.5 km^{2})
  - Land: 19.77 sq mi (51.2 km^{2})
  - Water: 0.09 sq mi (0.23 km^{2}) 0.45%
- Elevation: 778 ft (237 m)

Population (2020)
  - Total: 1,013
  - Density: 51.24/sq mi (19.78/km^{2})
- ZIP codes: 46120, 47433, 47456, 47460
- GNIS feature ID: 453892

Taylor Township is one of thirteen townships in Owen County, Indiana, United States. As of the 2020 census, its population was 1,013 (slightly down from 1,020 at 2010) and it contained 438 housing units.

== Geography ==
According to the 2010 census, the township has a total area of 19.87 square miles (51.5 km^{2}), of which 19.77 square miles (51.2 km^{2}) (or 99.50%) is land and 0.09 square miles (0.23 km^{2}) (or 0.45%) is water.

=== Unincorporated towns ===
- Devore at 39.429768°N 86.752784°W
- Quincy at 39.453658°N 86.712505°W
- Wallace Junction at 39.463658°N 86.726950°W

(This list is based on USGS data and may include former settlements.)

=== Cemeteries ===
The township contains Combes Cemetery.

=== Major highways ===
- U.S. Route 231

== School districts ==
- Cloverdale Community Schools

== Political districts ==
- State House District 46
- State Senate District 37
