= Alaska, Indiana =

- Unincorporated town
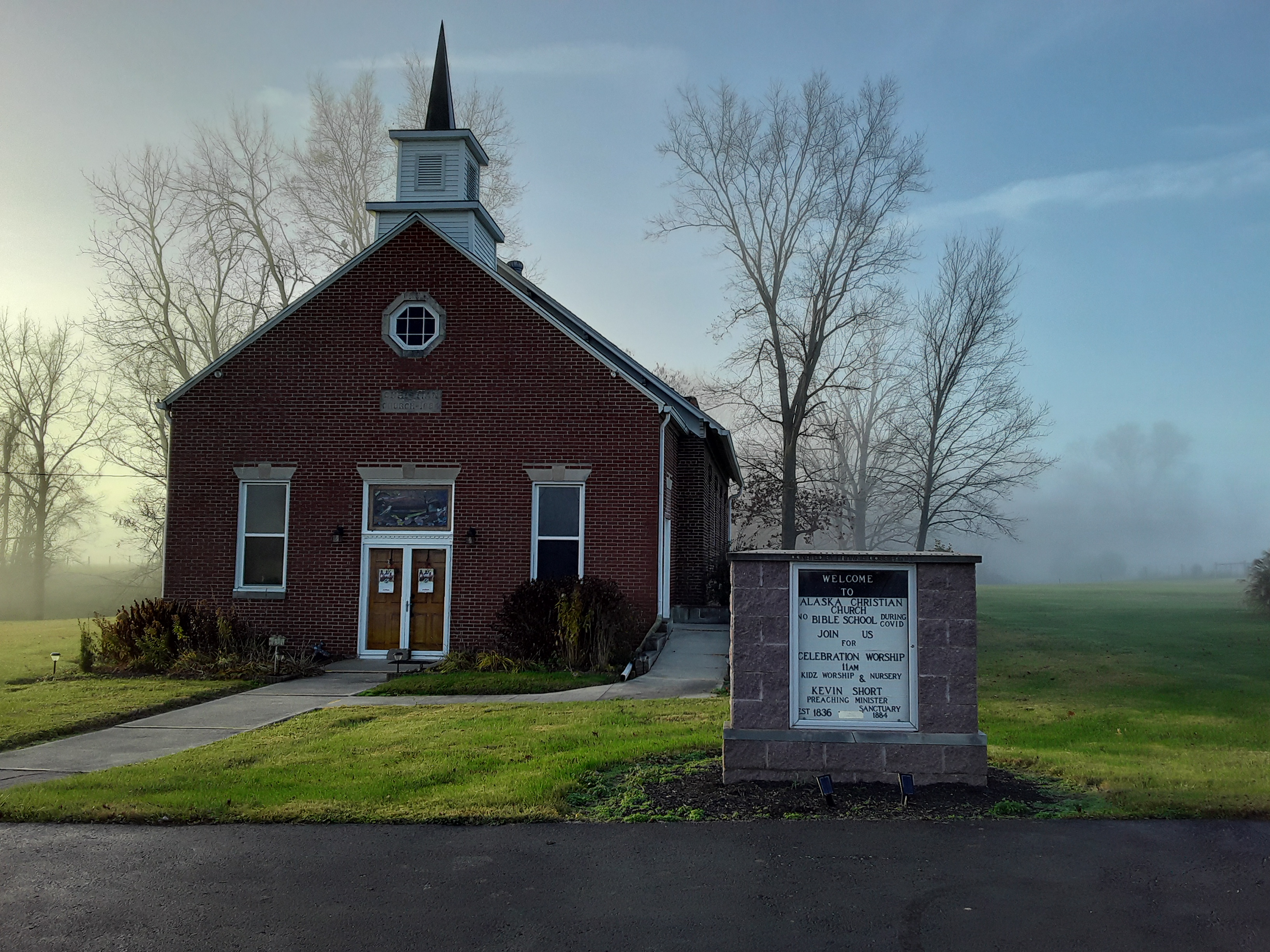
- Alaska Christian Church

- Location within Indiana Location within the United States
- Coordinates: 39°28′13″N 86°38′29″W
- Country: United States
- State: Indiana
- County: Morgan, Owen
- Township: Ashland, Harrison
- Elevation: 787 ft (240 m)
- Time zone: UTC-5 (Eastern (EST))
  - Summer (DST): UTC-4 (EDT)
- ZIP code: 47456
- GNIS feature ID: 430040

Alaska (also known as Sheasville) was an unincorporated town in Morgan and Owen counties, in the U.S. state of Indiana.

== History ==
A post office was established at Alaska in 1868, and remained in operation until it was discontinued in 1904. The community was probably named in commemoration of the purchase of the Territory of Alaska.
