= Johnstown, Indiana =

- Unincorporated community
- Location within Indiana Location within the United States
- Coordinates: 39°10′00″N 87°00′32″W
- Country: United States
- State: Indiana
- County: Greene
- Township: Jefferson
- Elevation: 518 ft (158 m)
- ZIP code: 47471
- FIPS code: 18-38808
- GNIS feature ID: 437069

Johnstown is an unincorporated community in Jefferson Township, Greene County, Indiana.
