= Ashland Township, Morgan County, Indiana =

Ashland Township
- Township
- Location in Morgan County
- Coordinates: 39°28′38″N 86°36′22″W
- Country: United States
- State: Indiana
- County: Morgan

Government
  - Type: Indiana township

Area
  - Total: 31.87 sq mi (82.5 km^{2})
  - Land: 31.76 sq mi (82.3 km^{2})
  - Water: 0.11 sq mi (0.28 km^{2}) 0.35%
- Elevation: 801 ft (244 m)

Population (2020)
  - Total: 1,773
  - Density: 54.2/sq mi (20.9/km^{2})
- Time zone: UTC-5 (Eastern (EST))
  - Summer (DST): UTC-4 (EDT)
- ZIP codes: 46120, 46151, 46166
- GNIS feature ID: 453092

Ashland Township is one of fourteen townships in Morgan County, Indiana, United States. As of the 2010 census, its population was 1,720 and it contained 694 housing units.

== Geography ==
According to the 2010 census, the township has a total area of 31.87 square miles (82.5 km^{2}), of which 31.76 square miles (82.3 km^{2}) (or 99.65%) is land and 0.11 square miles (0.28 km^{2}) (or 0.35%) is water.

=== Unincorporated towns ===
- Alaska at 39.4703246°N 86.6413912°W
- Plano at 39.4992137°N 86.6038898°W

=== Cemeteries ===
The township contains these two cemeteries: Lingle and Ratts.

=== Lakes ===
- J Lake

== School districts ==
- Eminence Community School Corporation

== Political districts ==
- Indiana's 4th congressional district
- State House District 47
- State Senate District 37
