= Harrison Township, Owen County, Indiana =

Harrison Township
- Township
- Location in Owen County
- Coordinates: 39°26′19″N 86°40′17″W
- Country: United States
- State: Indiana
- County: Owen

Government
  - Type: Indiana township

Area
  - Total: 17.58 sq mi (45.5 km^{2})
  - Land: 17.55 sq mi (45.5 km^{2})
  - Water: 0.03 sq mi (0.078 km^{2}) 0.17%
- Elevation: 790 ft (240 m)

Population (2020)
  - Total: 434
  - Density: 24.7/sq mi (9.55/km^{2})
- ZIP codes: 46166, 47433, 47456
- GNIS feature ID: 453394

Harrison Township is one of thirteen townships in Owen County, Indiana, United States. As of the 2020 census, its population was 434 (down from 444 at 2010), and it contained 191 housing units.

== History ==
Harrison Township was organized in 1837.

== Geography ==
According to the 2010 census, the township has a total area of 17.58 square miles (45.5 km^{2}), of which 17.55 square miles (45.5 km^{2}) (or 99.83%) is land and 0.03 square miles (0.078 km^{2}) (or 0.17%) is water.

=== Unincorporated towns ===
- Alaska at 39.4703246°N 86.6413912°W
- Lewisville at 39.471158°N 86.631946°W

=== Cemeteries ===
The township contains Asher Cemetery.

=== Airports and landing strips ===
- Shenandoah Flying Field Airport

== School districts ==
- Spencer-Owen Community Schools

== Political districts ==
- State House District 47
- State Senate District 37
