= Clay Township, Owen County, Indiana =

Clay Township
- Township
- Location in Owen County
- Coordinates: 39°12′32″N 86°43′48″W
- Country: United States
- State: Indiana
- County: Owen

Government
  - Type: Indiana township

Area
  - Total: 36.02 sq mi (93.3 km^{2})
  - Land: 36.02 sq mi (93.3 km^{2})
  - Water: 0 sq mi (0 km^{2}) 0%
- Elevation: 745 ft (227 m)

Population (2020)
  - Total: 2,566
  - Density: 71.24/sq mi (27.51/km^{2})
- ZIP codes: 47404, 47459, 47460
- GNIS feature ID: 453216

Clay Township is one of thirteen townships in Owen County, Indiana, United States. As of the 2020 census, its population was 2,566 (down from 2,600 at 2010) and it contained 1,134 housing units.

== History ==
Clay Township was named for Kentucky statesman Henry Clay.

The Ennis Archaeological Site was listed on the National Register of Historic Places in 1985.

== Geography ==
According to the 2010 census, the township has a total area of 36.02 square miles (93.3 km^{2}), all land.

=== Unincorporated towns ===
- Braysville at 39.211712°N 86.77445°W
- Freeman at 39.195323°N 86.733615°W
- Whitehall at 39.174213°N 86.684447°W

(This list is based on USGS data and may include former settlements.)

=== Cemeteries ===
The township contains five cemeteries: Brown, Gross, Hopewell, Livingston, and Moreland.

== School districts ==
- Spencer-Owen Community Schools

== Political districts ==
- State House District 46
- State Senate District 39
