= Cataract, Indiana =

- Unincorporated community
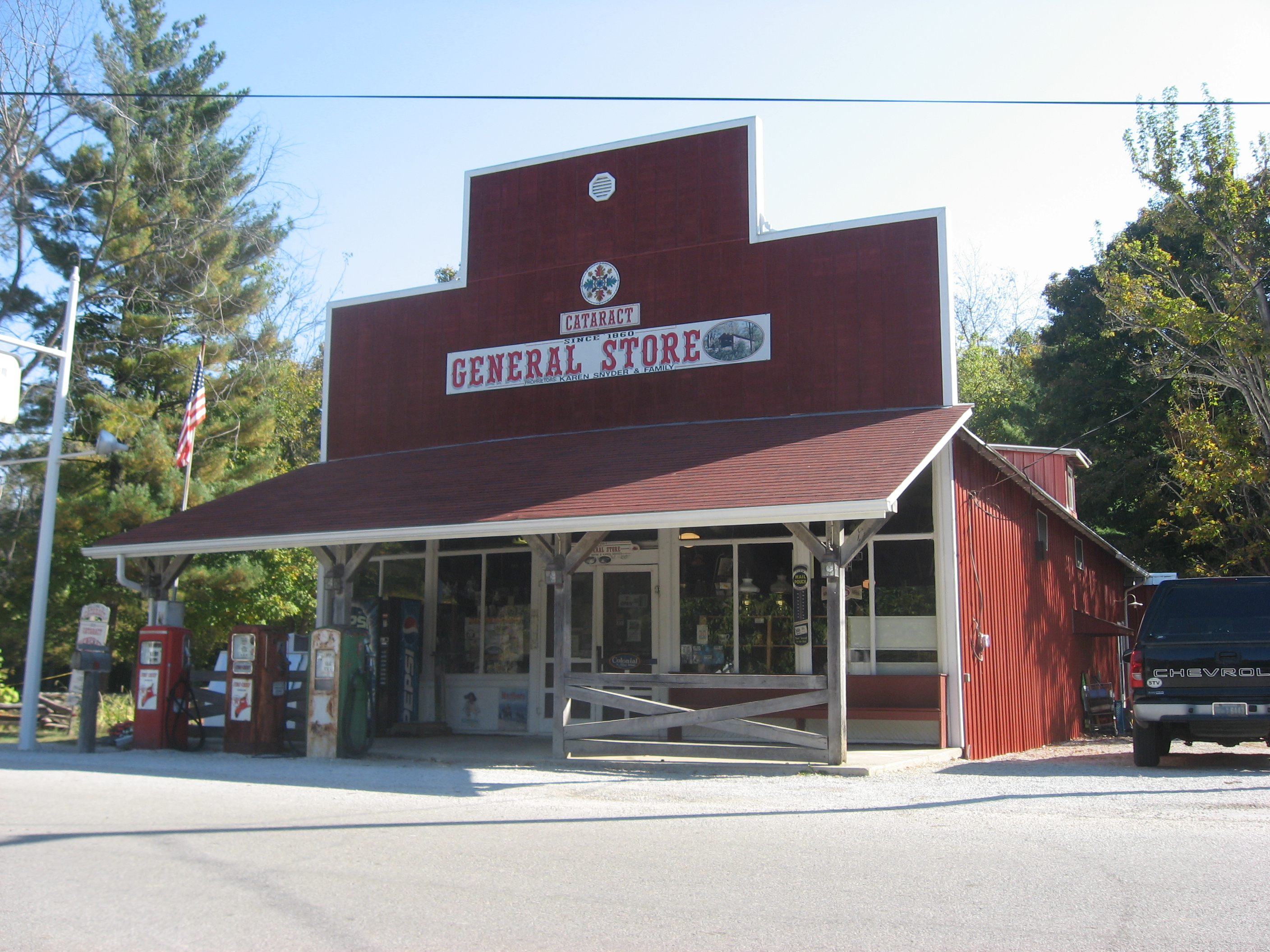
- The community's general store

- Location within Indiana Location within the United States
- Coordinates: 39°25′39″N 86°48′59″W
- Country: United States
- State: Indiana
- County: Owen
- Township: Jennings
- Elevation: 771 ft (235 m)
- Time zone: UTC-5 (Eastern (EST))
  - Summer (DST): UTC-4 (EDT)
- ZIP code: 47460
- Area codes: 812, 930
- GNIS feature ID: 432235

Cataract is an unincorporated community in Jennings Township, Owen County, in the U.S. state of Indiana.

== History ==
Cataract was platted in 1851. It takes its name from the large waterfalls, or cataract, nearby. A post office was established at Cataract in 1846, and remained in operation until it was discontinued in 1936.
