= Adel, Indiana =

- Unincorporated Community
- Location within Indiana Location within the United States
- Coordinates: 39°11′31″N 86°47′45″W
- Country: United States
- State: Indiana
- County: Owen
- Township: Franklin
- Established: 1859
- Elevation: 541 ft (165 m)
- Time zone: UTC-5 (Eastern (EST))
  - Summer (DST): UTC-4 (EDT)
- ZIP code: 47460
- Area codes: 812, 930
- GNIS feature ID: 430020

Adel is an unincorporated community in eastern Franklin Township, Owen County, in the U.S. state of Indiana. It lies near the bridge on County Road 150 West over Raccoon Creek, which is a community nearly ten miles southwest of the city of Spencer, the county seat.

== History ==
Adel was founded in 1859. A post office was established at Adel in 1889, and remained in operation until it was discontinued in 1906.

== Political districts ==
- State House District 46
- State Senate District 39
