= Quincy, Indiana =

- Unincorporated community
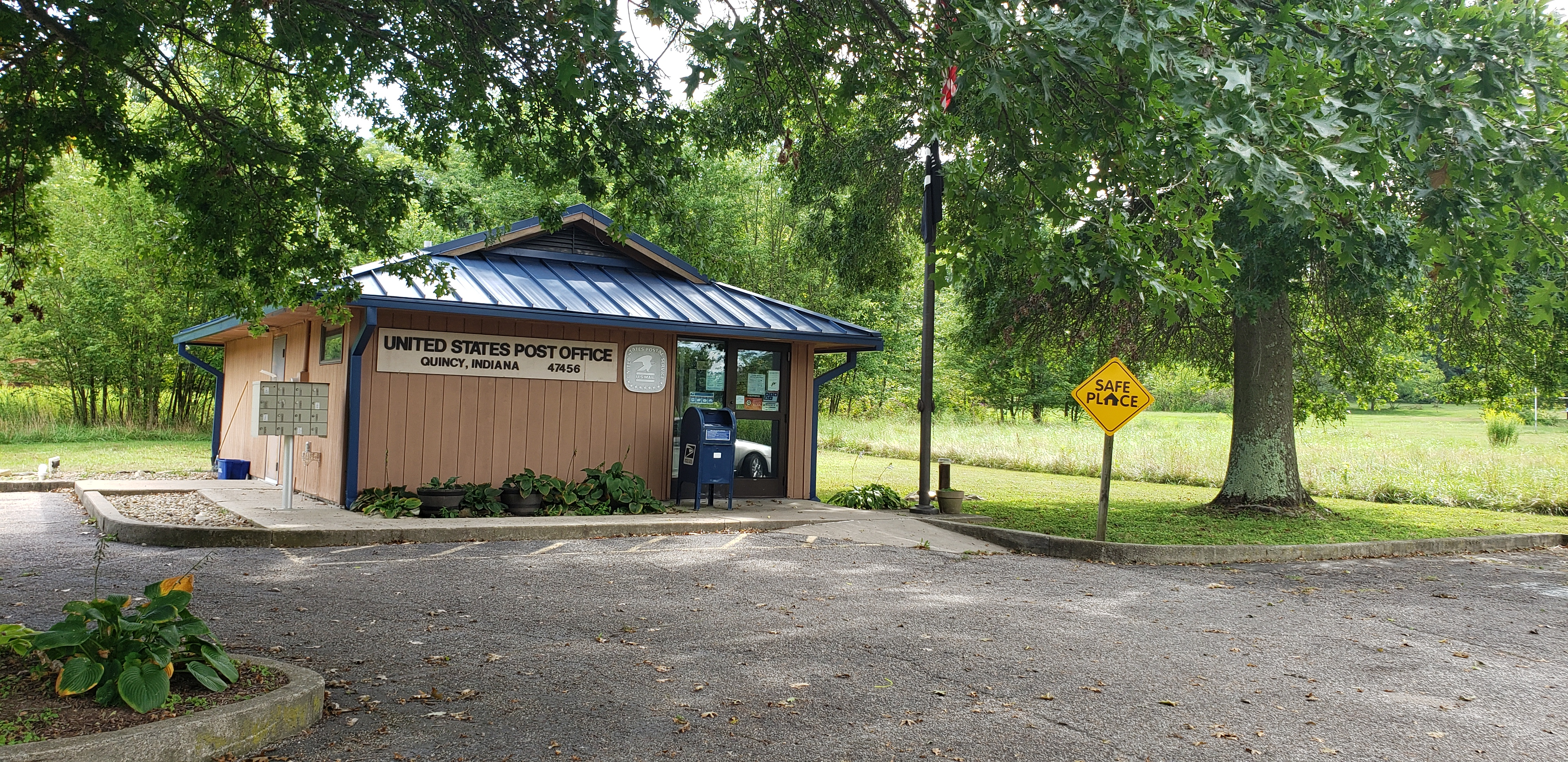

- Location within Indiana Location within the United States
- Coordinates: 39°27′13″N 86°42′45″W
- Country: United States
- State: Indiana
- County: Owen
- Township: Taylor
- Elevation: 738 ft (225 m)
- Time zone: UTC-5 (Eastern (EST))
  - Summer (DST): UTC-4 (EDT)
- ZIP code: 47456
- Area codes: 812, 930
- GNIS feature ID: 441701

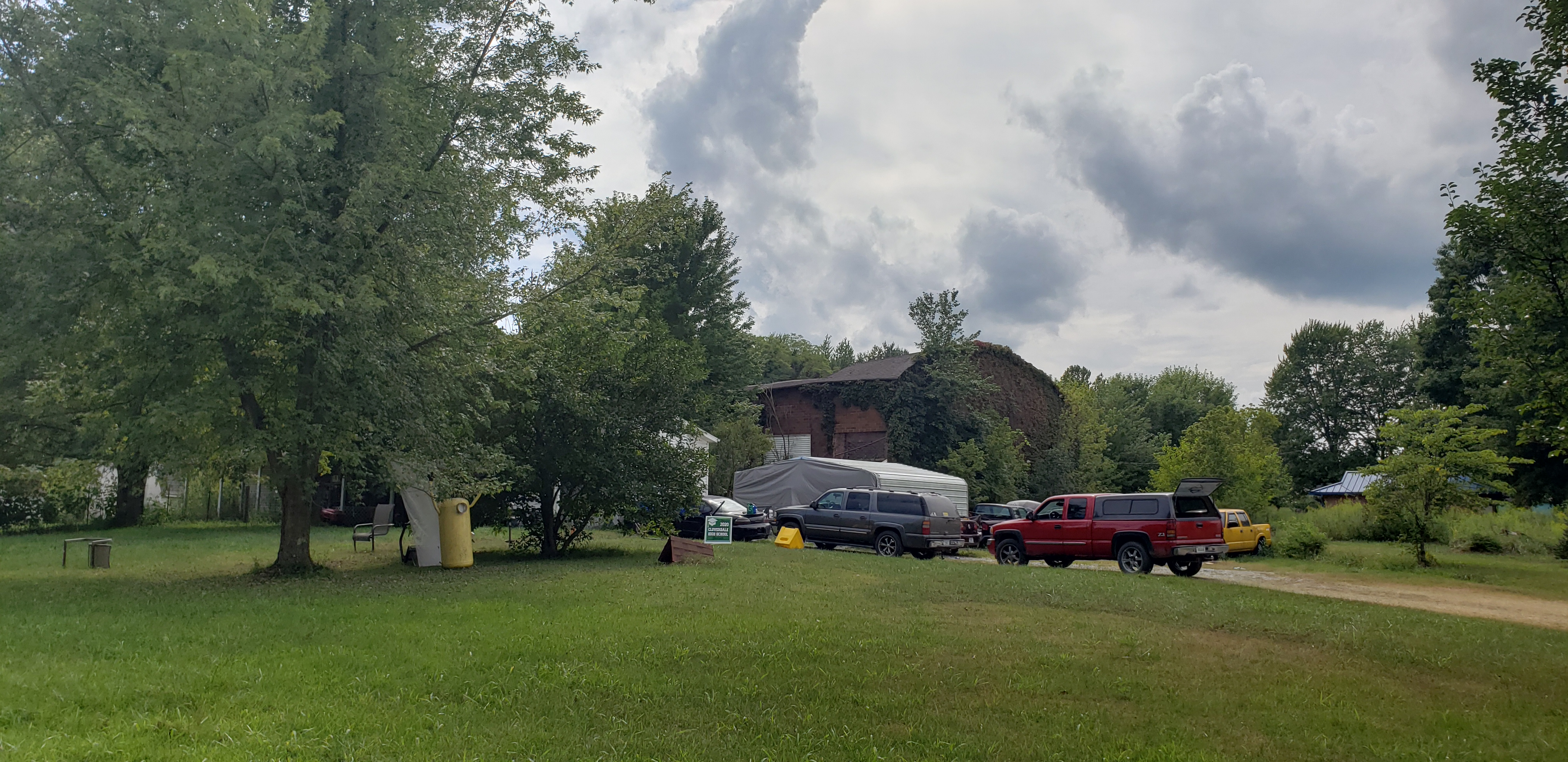
Old Quincy High School Gymnasium

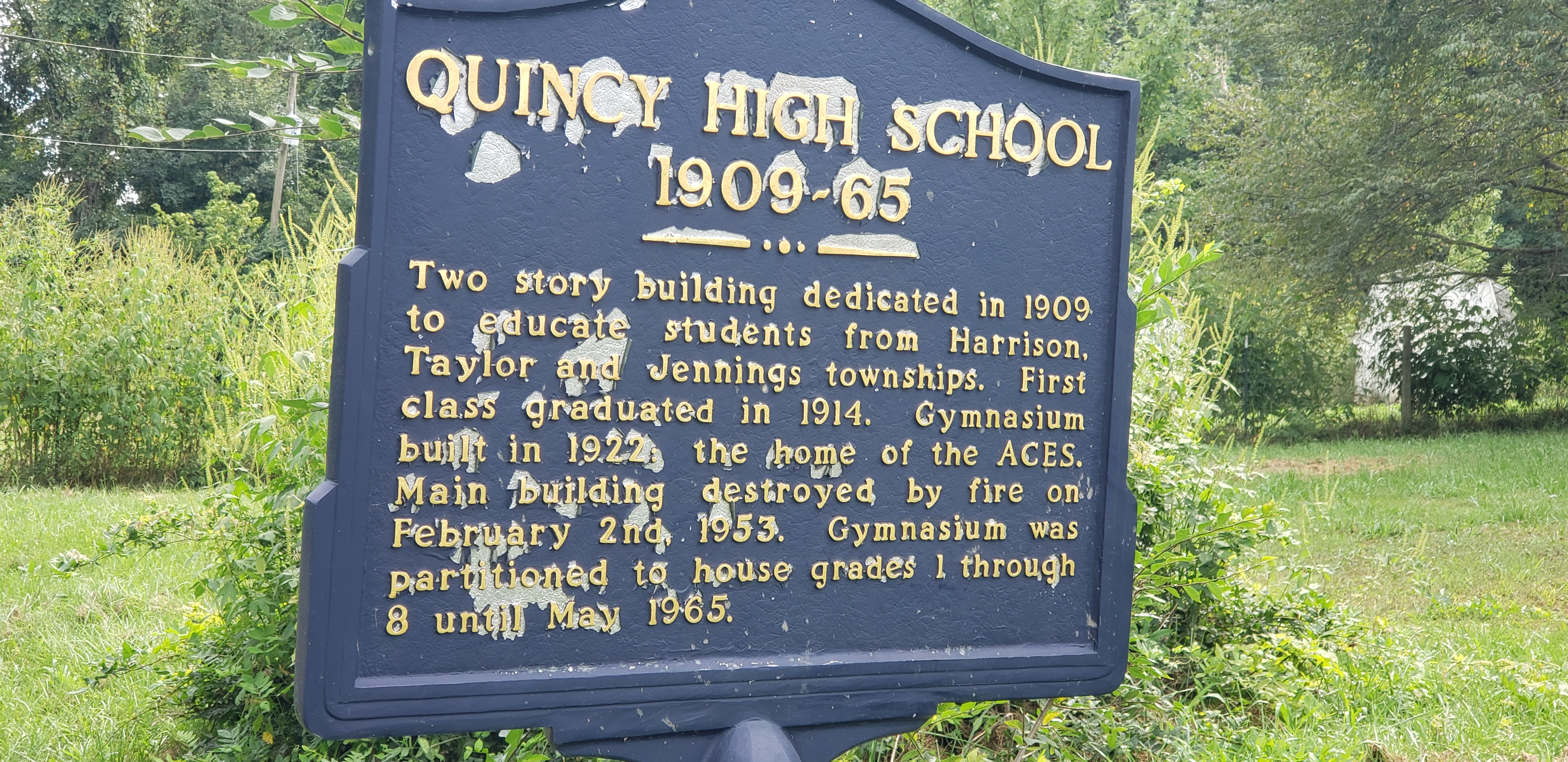
Quincy High School historical marker

Quincy is an unincorporated community in northeastern Taylor Township, Owen County, in the U.S. state of Indiana. It lies just south of CR1150N, north of the town of Spencer, the county seat of Owen County. It has a post office, with the ZIP code of 47456.

== History ==
Quincy had its start in the year 1853 with the building of the New Albany Railroad (a precursor to the Monon Railroad) through that territory. Many of the workers on this railroad had built homes along Brush Creek, where the railroad crossed it. William L. Hart and his wife Lucy had the area around the Brush Creek trestle surveyed for a town, which was to be named Quincy. This plat was received at the Owen County Courthouse in Spencer on June 7, 1853. In 1854, the town's post office was established, where it has been still operating since.

The settlement of Dunkirk on the western side of Jay County was platted as "Quincy" in 1853. However, when a post office was being established there, it was discovered that this town already had a post office with that name, so the Jay County settlement was renamed as Dunkirk.

The town of Quincy was thriving when a fire was accidentally started on November 3, 1873. Most of the business district was destroyed, including three dry goods stores. Another fire occurred on May 9, 1930, which destroyed the same part of town. The buildings that were destroyed were the O.E. Stewart store, Dunkin general store, the Herbert store, the post office and two smaller buildings. This meant all five stores of Quincy were burned down. The Red Men and Knights of Pythias lodges, which held their meetings in the upper floors of two of these buildings, lost everything. Three of the buildings destroyed were two stories tall. This and the burning of the Quincy school on February 2, 1953, signaled the end of the business district of the town. The population has ranged between 200 and 300 since the Civil War.

== The Quincy Picnic ==
A historical marker placed at the site where the picnic was held says it started in 1870 and ended in 1972. It appears the first picnic at Quincy was held in 1870 as a joint venture of the Baptist and Methodist congregations of the town. Two hundred people turned out.

By the 20th century, the Quincy Picnic was said to be one of the largest events of its kind in the state, if not the entire Midwest. Newspaper articles of the time touted crowd estimates that seem astounding: 1914: 10,000 1935: 13,000

== Notable people from Quincy ==
- Birch Evans Bayh Sr., Indiana State University basketball coach and father of U.S. Senator Birch Evans Bayh II
