= Montgomery Township, Owen County, Indiana =

Montgomery Township
- Township
- Location in Owen County
- Coordinates: 39°22′01″N 86°46′23″W
- Country: United States
- State: Indiana
- County: Owen

Government
  - Type: Indiana township

Area
  - Total: 23.55 sq mi (61.0 km^{2})
  - Land: 23.46 sq mi (60.8 km^{2})
  - Water: 0.09 sq mi (0.23 km^{2}) 0.38%
- Elevation: 709 ft (216 m)

Population (2020)
  - Total: 1,203
  - Density: 51.28/sq mi (19.80/km^{2})
- ZIP codes: 47433, 47460, 47868
- GNIS feature ID: 453651

Montgomery Township is one of thirteen townships in Owen County, Indiana, United States. As of the 2020 census, its population was 1,203 (down from 1,304 at 2010) and it contained 562 housing units.

== History ==
Montgomery Township was founded in 1819.

== Geography ==
According to the 2010 census, the township has a total area of 23.55 square miles (61.0 km^{2}), of which 23.46 square miles (60.8 km^{2}) (or 99.62%) is land and 0.09 square miles (0.23 km^{2}) (or 0.38%) is water.

=== Unincorporated towns ===
- Carp at 39.385046°N 86.76084°W
- Cuba at 39.378101°N 86.798063°W

(This list is based on USGS data and may include former settlements.)

=== Cemeteries ===
The township contains these three cemeteries: Cloyd, Kaufman and Smith.

=== Major highways ===
- U.S. Route 231
- Indiana State Road 67

=== Lakes ===
- Amazon Lake

== School districts ==
- Spencer-Owen Community Schools

== Political districts ==
- State House District 46
- State Senate District 37
