= Morgan Township, Owen County, Indiana =

Morgan Township
- Township
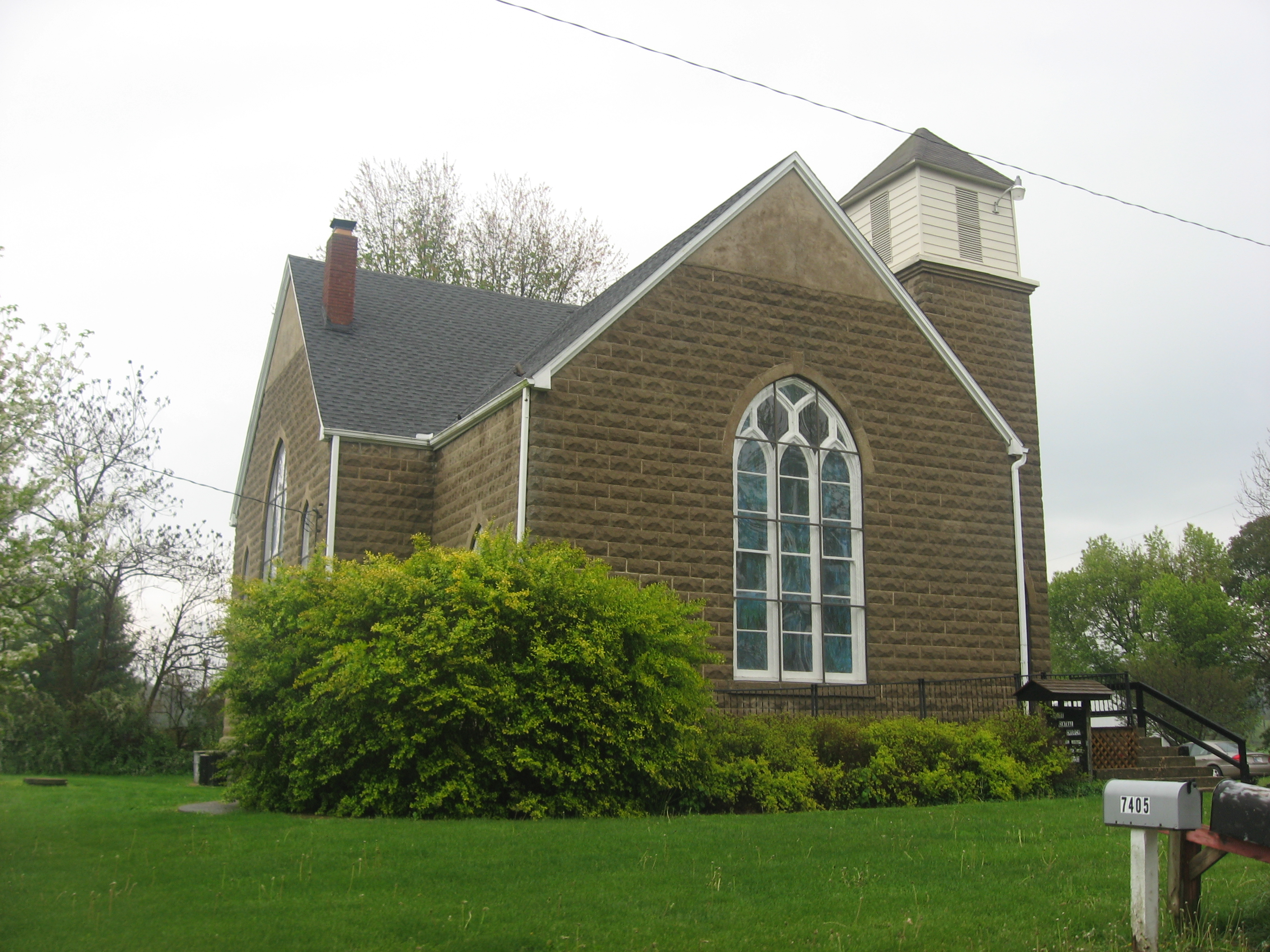

- Location in Owen County
- Coordinates: 39°21′52″N 86°53′15″W
- Country: United States
- State: Indiana
- County: Owen

Government
  - Type: Indiana township

Area
  - Total: 29.65 sq mi (76.8 km^{2})
  - Land: 29.57 sq mi (76.6 km^{2})
  - Water: 0.08 sq mi (0.21 km^{2}) 0.27%
- Elevation: 774 ft (236 m)

Population (2020)
  - Total: 1,148
  - Density: 38.82/sq mi (14.99/km^{2})
- ZIP codes: 47460, 47833, 47868
- GNIS feature ID: 453654

Morgan Township is one of thirteen townships in Owen County, Indiana, United States. As of the 2020 census, its population was 1,148 (down from 1,237 at 2010) and it contained 593 housing units.

== History ==
Morgan Township was founded in the 1820s.

== Geography ==
According to the 2010 census, the township has a total area of 29.65 square miles (76.8 km^{2}), of which 29.57 square miles (76.6 km^{2}) (or 99.73%) is land and 0.08 square miles (0.21 km^{2}) (or 0.27%) is water.

=== Unincorporated towns ===
- Atkinsonville at 39.377822°N 86.873342°W
- Beamer at 39.366710°N 86.937511°W
- Jordan at 39.398377°N 86.916677°W

(This list is based on USGS data and may include former settlements.)

=== Cemeteries ===
The township contains these three cemeteries: Olive Hill, Pleasant Grove and Spears.

=== Major highways ===
- Indiana State Road 46

=== Lakes ===
- Greybrook Lake

== School districts ==
- Spencer-Owen Community Schools

== Political districts ==
- State House District 46
- State Senate District 37
- State Senate District 39
