= Pottersville, Indiana =

- Unincorporated town
- Location within Indiana Location within the United States
- Coordinates: 39°12′26″N 86°48′51″W
- Country: United States
- State: Indiana
- County: Owen
- Township: Franklin
- Elevation: 636 ft (194 m)
- Time zone: UTC-5 (Eastern (EST))
  - Summer (DST): UTC-4 (EDT)
- ZIP code: 47431
- Area codes: 812, 930
- GNIS feature ID: 441507

Pottersville was an unincorporated town in Franklin Township, Owen County, in the U.S. state of Indiana. Pottersville was laid out in 1858, but it failed to flourish and was abandoned by the 1880s.
