= National Register of Historic Places listings in Monroe County, Indiana =

Location of Monroe County in Indiana

This is a list of the National Register of Historic Places listings in Monroe County, Indiana.

This is intended to be a complete list of the properties and districts on the National Register of Historic Places in Monroe County, Indiana, United States. Latitude and longitude coordinates are provided for many National Register properties and districts; these locations may be seen together in a map.

There are 52 properties and districts listed on the National Register in the county. Another property was once listed but has been removed.

Properties and districts located in incorporated areas display the name of the municipality, while properties and districts in unincorporated areas display the name of their civil township. Properties and districts split between multiple jurisdictions display the names of all jurisdictions.

This National Park Service list is complete through NPS recent listings posted September 26, 2025.

== Current listings ==
| | Name on the Register | Image | Date listed | Location | City or town | Description |
|---|---|---|---|---|---|---|
| 1 | Elias Abel House | Elias Abel House | February 19, 1982 (#82000023) | 317 N. Fairview St. 39°10′09″N 86°32′29″W | Bloomington | |
| 2 | Blair-Dunning House | Blair-Dunning House | February 10, 1983 (#83000009) | 608 W. 3rd St. 39°09′52″N 86°32′24″W | Bloomington | |
| 3 | Bloomington City Hall | Bloomington City Hall | September 14, 1989 (#89001413) | 122 S. Walnut St. 39°09′57″N 86°32′02″W | Bloomington | |
| 4 | Bloomington West Side Historic District | Bloomington West Side Historic District | February 14, 1997 (#97000055) | Roughly bounded by W. 10th, N. Morton, W. 4th, and N. Adams Sts. 39°10′07″N 86°32′34″W | Bloomington | |
| 5 | Breezy Point Farm Historic District | Breezy Point Farm Historic District | December 3, 2018 (#100003185) | 8000 W. Sand College Rd. 39°20′28″N 86°39′00″W | Bean Blossom Township | |
| 6 | Cantol Wax Company Building | Cantol Wax Company Building | May 24, 1990 (#90000812) | 211 N. Washington St. 39°10′04″N 86°31′57″W | Bloomington | |
| 7 | Carter-Randall-Parker House | Carter-Randall-Parker House | December 3, 2018 (#100003186) | 3636 S. Rogers St. 39°07′28″N 86°32′22″W | Perry Township | |
| 8 | Cascades Park | | August 20, 2024 (#100010743) | 2851 Old State Rd 37; 39°11′53″N 86°32′13″W | Bloomington | |
| 9 | Coca-Cola Bottling Company Plant | Coca-Cola Bottling Company Plant | March 15, 2000 (#00000206) | 318 S. Washington St. 39°09′50″N 86°31′57″W | Bloomington | |
| 10 | Cochran-Helton-Lindley House | Cochran-Helton-Lindley House | June 20, 1979 (#79000010) | 405 N. Rogers St. 39°10′11″N 86°32′20″W | Bloomington | |
| 11 | Courthouse Square Historic District | Courthouse Square Historic District | December 18, 1990 (#90001931) | Roughly bounded by 7th, Walnut, and 4th Sts. and College Ave. 39°10′00″N 86°32′04″W | Bloomington | |
| 12 | Ellettsville Downtown Historic District | Ellettsville Downtown Historic District | September 20, 2006 (#06000849) | Roughly bounded by Main, Sale, Walnut, and Association Sts. 39°14′18″N 86°37′29″W | Ellettsville | |
| 13 | Ennis Archaeological Site (12 OW 229) | Ennis Archaeological Site (12 OW 229) | May 30, 1985 (#85001167) | Address Restricted | Richland Township | Extends into Owen County |
| 14 | Epsilon II Archeological Site (12MO133) | Epsilon II Archeological Site (12MO133) | March 25, 1986 (#86000524) | Address Restricted | Polk Township | |
| 15 | Hinkle-Garton Farmstead | Hinkle-Garton Farmstead | April 12, 2007 (#07000282) | 2920 E. 10th St. 39°10′16″N 86°29′50″W | Bloomington | |
| 16 | Home Laundry Company | Home Laundry Company | March 15, 2000 (#00000208) | 300 E. 3rd St. 39°09′52″N 86°31′50″W | Bloomington | |
| 17 | Honey Creek School | Honey Creek School | September 20, 1978 (#78000024) | Northeast of Bloomington on Low Gap Rd. 39°17′07″N 86°24′32″W | Benton Township | |
| 18 | Illinois Central Railroad Freight Depot | Illinois Central Railroad Freight Depot | June 23, 1983 (#83000113) | 301 N. Morton St. 39°10′07″N 86°32′11″W | Bloomington | |
| 19 | Johnson's Creamery | Johnson's Creamery | March 14, 1996 (#96000284) | 400 W. 7th St. 39°10′08″N 86°32′14″W | Bloomington | |
| 20 | Kappa V Archeological Site (12MO301) | Kappa V Archeological Site (12MO301) | March 31, 1986 (#86000630) | Address Restricted | Polk Township | |
| 21 | John F. and Malissa Koontz House | John F. and Malissa Koontz House | March 26, 2014 (#14000075) | 7401 S. Mount Zion Rd., southwest of Bloomington; 39°04′05″N 86°37′34″W | Indian Creek Township | |
| 22 | Legg House | Legg House | April 12, 2001 (#01000359) | 324 S. Henderson; 39°09′49″N 86°31′39″W | Bloomington | |
| 23 | Maple Grove Road Rural Historic District | Maple Grove Road Rural Historic District | August 21, 1998 (#98001051) | Roughly Maple Grove Rd. from Beanblossom Creek to State Road 46 northwest of Bloomington, including the eastern half of the Lancaster Park subdivision 39°13′19″N 86°33′46″W | Bloomington and Richland Townships | |
| 24 | Matthews Stone Company Historic District | Matthews Stone Company Historic District | September 18, 2013 (#13000725) | 6293 N. Matthews Dr. and 6445 W. Maple Grove Rd., north of Ellettsville; 39°14′42″N 86°37′10″W | Richland Township | |
| 25 | Leroy Mayfield House | Leroy Mayfield House | June 10, 1994 (#94000583) | 110 N. Oard Rd., west of Bloomington; 39°10′03″N 86°37′12″W | Richland Township | |
| 26 | McDoel Historic District | | August 25, 2021 (#100006846) | Roughly bounded by West Wylie St., South Morton St., Patterson Dr., and Clear Cr. 39°09′24″N 86°32′19″W | Bloomington | |
| 27 | Dr. Robert L. and Ellen Milisen House | | May 24, 2021 (#100006567) | 4180 North Old IN 37; 39°07′09″N 86°31′53″W | Bloomington vicinity | |
| 28 | Millen House | Millen House | September 29, 2004 (#04001104) | 112 N. Bryan Ave. 39°10′02″N 86°30′28″W | Bloomington | |
| 29 | Millen-Chase-McCalla House | Millen-Chase-McCalla House | March 26, 2014 (#14000076) | 403 N. Walnut St. 39°10′11″N 86°32′02″W | Bloomington | |
| 30 | Joseph Mitchell House | Joseph Mitchell House | June 13, 1986 (#86001268) | 7008 Ketcham Rd., west of Smithville; 39°04′21″N 86°32′58″W | Clear Creek Township | |
| 31 | Monroe Carnegie Library | Monroe Carnegie Library | March 8, 1978 (#78000025) | 200 E. 6th St. 39°10′03″N 86°31′54″W | Bloomington | |
| 32 | Monroe County Courthouse | Monroe County Courthouse | October 8, 1976 (#76000012) | Courthouse Sq. 39°10′01″N 86°32′03″W | Bloomington | |
| 33 | Morgan House | Morgan House | March 3, 1983 (#83000140) | 532 N. Walnut St. 39°10′16″N 86°32′00″W | Bloomington | Designed by architect George Franklin Barber |
| 34 | J.L. Nichols House and Studio | J.L. Nichols House and Studio | September 27, 1984 (#84001207) | 820 N. College Ave. 39°10′28″N 86°32′03″W | Bloomington | |
| 35 | North Washington Street Historic District | North Washington Street Historic District | March 14, 1991 (#91000271) | Roughly bounded by E. 10th, E. 8th, N. Walnut and N. Lincoln Sts. 39°10′13″N 86°31′57″W | Bloomington | |
| 36 | The Old Crescent | The Old Crescent | September 8, 1980 (#80000028) | Indiana University campus 39°09′59″N 86°31′29″W | Bloomington | |
| 37 | Princess Theatre | Princess Theatre | June 16, 1983 (#83000112) | 206 N. Walnut St. 39°10′04″N 86°32′01″W | Bloomington | |
| 38 | Prospect Hill Historic District | Prospect Hill Historic District | March 14, 1991 (#91000272) | Roughly bounded by 3rd, Rogers, Smith, and Jackson Sts. 39°09′50″N 86°32′20″W | Bloomington | |
| 39 | Second Baptist Church | Second Baptist Church | September 14, 1995 (#95001108) | 321 N. Rogers St. 39°10′09″N 86°32′20″W | Bloomington | |
| 40 | Secrest Ferry Bridge | Secrest Ferry Bridge | May 30, 1996 (#96000603) | County Road 450E over the West Fork of the White River, south of Gosport; 39°19′57″N 86°40′35″W | Bean Blossom Township | Extends into Owen County |
| 41 | Seminary Square Park | Seminary Square Park | September 19, 1977 (#77000012) | College Ave. and E. 2nd St. 39°09′40″N 86°32′03″W | Bloomington | |
| 42 | Steele Dunning Historic District | Steele Dunning Historic District | September 22, 2000 (#00001140) | Roughly bounded by Maple St., Kirkwood Ave., Rogers St., and W. 3rd St. 39°09′56″N 86°32′28″W | Bloomington | |
| 43 | Stinesville Commercial Historic District | Stinesville Commercial Historic District | June 8, 1995 (#95000707) | 8201, 8211, 8223, 8231, and 8237 W. Main St. 39°17′55″N 86°39′03″W | Stinesville | |
| 44 | Stinesville Historic District | | February 23, 2023 (#100008663) | Roughly bounded by North., Sycamore, Elm, and East Sts. including east side of Main St. to Broadway St. 39°17′56″N 86°39′00″W | Stinesville | |
| 45 | Stipp-Bender Farm | | May 31, 2023 (#100009014) | 5075 South Victor Pike; 39°06′24″N 86°33′01″W | Clear Creek vicinity | |
| 46 | Daniel Stout House | Daniel Stout House | November 30, 1973 (#73000012) | Northwest of Bloomington off State Road 46, on Maple Grove Rd. 39°12′13″N 86°33′32″W | Bloomington Township | |
| 47 | Tate-Tatum Farm | Tate-Tatum Farm | December 2, 2020 (#100005874) | 1780 East Rayletown Rd. 39°05′33″N 86°30′38″W | Perry Township | |
| 48 | University Courts Historic District | University Courts Historic District | December 26, 2007 (#07001308) | Roughly bounded by 7th St., Indiana Ave., 10th St., and Woodlawn Ave. 39°10′12″N 86°31′31″W | Bloomington | |
| 49 | Vinegar Hill Historic District | Vinegar Hill Historic District | June 17, 2005 (#05000195) | E. 1st St. from Woodlawn to Jordan and S. Sheridan to E. Maxwell; 39°09′33″N 86°31′10″W | Bloomington | |
| 50 | Wicks Building | Wicks Building | March 3, 1983 (#83000141) | 116 W. 6th St. 39°10′03″N 86°32′02″W | Bloomington | |
| 51 | Woolery Stone Company | Woolery Stone Company | December 20, 2002 (#02001563) | 2295 W. Tapp Rd. 39°08′21″N 86°33′38″W | Bloomington | |
| 52 | Andrew Wylie House | Andrew Wylie House | April 18, 1977 (#77000013) | 307 E. 2nd St. 39°09′42″N 86°31′50″W | Bloomington | |

== Former listing ==
| | Name on the Register | Image | Date listed | Date removed | Location | City or town | Description |
|---|---|---|---|---|---|---|---|
| 1 | St. John's Lutheran Church | St. John's Lutheran Church | June 29, 1982 (#82000024) | July 9, 1991 | Old Dutch Church Rd. 39°16′05″N 86°37′44″W | Ellettsville | |

== See also ==
- List of National Historic Landmarks in Indiana
- National Register of Historic Places listings in Indiana
- Listings in neighboring counties: Brown, Greene, Jackson, Lawrence, Morgan, Owen
- List of Indiana state historical markers in Monroe County
