= Woolery =

Woolery is a surname. Notable people with the surname include:

- Chuck Woolery (1941–2024), American game show host, talk show host, and musician
- Jordan Woolery, American softball player
- Kaiyne Woolery (born 1995), British footballer
- Laurie Woolery, American playwright, director, and educator

== See also ==
- Woolery Stone Company
