= List of Indiana state historical markers in Monroe County =

Location of Monroe County in Indiana

This is a list of the Indiana state historical markers in Monroe County in the US state of Indiana.

This is intended to be a complete list of the official state historical markers placed in Monroe County, Indiana, United States by the Indiana Historical Bureau. The locations of the historical markers and their latitude and longitude coordinates are included below when available, along with their names, years of placement, and topics as recorded by the Historical Bureau. There are 11 historical markers located in Monroe County.

== Historical markers ==
Marker title	Image	Year placed	Location	Topics
Stinesville Limestone Industry		1996	McGlocklin Memorial/Victor Oolitic Park near Jacks Defeat Creek in Stinesville; 39°17′56″N 86°39′8″W	Business, Industry, and Labor, Buildings and Architecture
Ferry Bridge		2000	N. Texas Ridge Road over the West Fork of the White River, 2 miles south of Gosport; 39°19′56″N 86°40′37″W	Transportation, Buildings and Architecture
Monroe County Courthouse		2001	Southern side of the courthouse square in Bloomington; 39°10′0.5″N 86°32′3″W	Buildings and Architecture, Government Institutions
The Colored School		2005	Junction of Sixth and Washington Streets in Bloomington; 39°10′3″N 86°31′55″W	African American; Black History, Education
Monroe County's Carnegie Library		2007	202 E. 6th Street in Bloomington; 39°10′3″N 86°31′54.6″W	Carnegie Libraries, Buildings and Architecture
Hoagy Carmichael		2007	In front of The Gables (formerly Book Nook) at 114 S. Indiana Avenue in Bloomington; 39°10′3″N 86°31′56″W	Arts and Culture
Kappa Alpha Psi		2008	The Elder Diggs Memorial at 1469 E. 17th Street in Bloomington; 39°10′45″N 86°30′48″W	[none]
Benjamin Banneker School		2008	Westside Community Center at 930 W. Seventh Street in Bloomington; 39°10′7.4″N 86°32′42.6″W	African American, Education
State Seminary of Indiana		2011	100 W. 2nd St., Bloomington; 39°09′41″N 86°32′01″W	Education
Integrating Basketball		2016	Wildermuth Intramural Center, Indiana University's School of Public Health, 1025 E. 7th St., Bloomington; 39°10′7.1″N 86°31′20.2″W	African American, Sports
Black Market Firebombing		2020	Peoples Park, 501 E. Kirkland Ave., Bloomington; 39°09′59.7″N 86°31′40.3″W	

== See also ==
- List of Indiana state historical markers
- National Register of Historic Places listings in Monroe County, Indiana
