= WBWB =

Bloomington, Indiana; United States
- Broadcast area: Bloomington metropolitan area
- Frequency: 96.7 MHz
- Branding: B97

Programming
- Language: English
- Format: Contemporary hit radio
- Affiliations: Indiana Hoosiers; Premiere Networks

Ownership
- Owner: Sound Management, LLC
- Sister stations: WHCC

History
- First air date: July 17, 1978

Technical information
- Licensing authority: FCC
- Facility ID: 68968
- Class: A
- ERP: 1,650 watts
- HAAT: 134 meters (440 ft)
- Transmitter coordinates: 39°09′46″N 86°28′22″W

Links
- Public license information: Public file; LMS
- Webcast: Listen live
- Website: www.wbwb.com

WBWB (96.7 MHz, B97) is a contemporary hit radio station serving the Bloomington metropolitan area. The station is owned and operated by Sound Management, LLC.
