= Bloom Magazine =

Magazine

- Categories: Lifestyle magazine
- Frequency: Bi-monthly
- Founder: Malcolm Abrams
- Founded: 2005
- Country: United States
- Based in: Bloomington, Indiana
- Language: English
- Website: Bloom Magazine
- ISSN: 1949-9698
- OCLC: 78211799

Bloom Magazine is a bimonthly culture and lifestyle magazine published in Bloomington, Indiana, United States. Founded in 2005 by editor and publisher Malcolm Abrams, Bloom is an independent, free magazine with 12,000 copies available throughout the Bloomington area. Each issue highlights various community members, places, and events, and includes stories on arts, entertainment, food and wine, fashion and shopping, health and fitness, home and family, community, and business, and finance.
