= WHCC =

- Ellettsville, Indiana; United States
- Broadcast area: Bloomington, Indiana
- Frequency: 105.1 MHz
- Branding: Hoosier Country 105

Programming
- Format: Country

Ownership
- Owner: Sound Management, LLC
- Sister stations: WBWB

Technical information
- Licensing authority: FCC
- Facility ID: 33540
- Class: A
- ERP: 1,700 watts
- HAAT: 189 meters (620 ft)
- Transmitter coordinates: 39°11′32″N 86°41′46″W

Links
- Public license information: Public file; LMS
- Webcast: Listen live
- Website: whcc105.com

WHCC (105.1 FM, "Hoosier Country 105") is a radio station broadcasting a country music format. Licensed to Ellettsville, Indiana, United States, the station serves Bloomington, Indiana area. The station is currently owned by Sound Management, LLC.

WHCC is the flagship station for Indiana Hoosiers football and men's basketball.
