= Buskirk-Chumley Theater =

Coordinates: 39°09′58.6″N 86°31′58.2″W

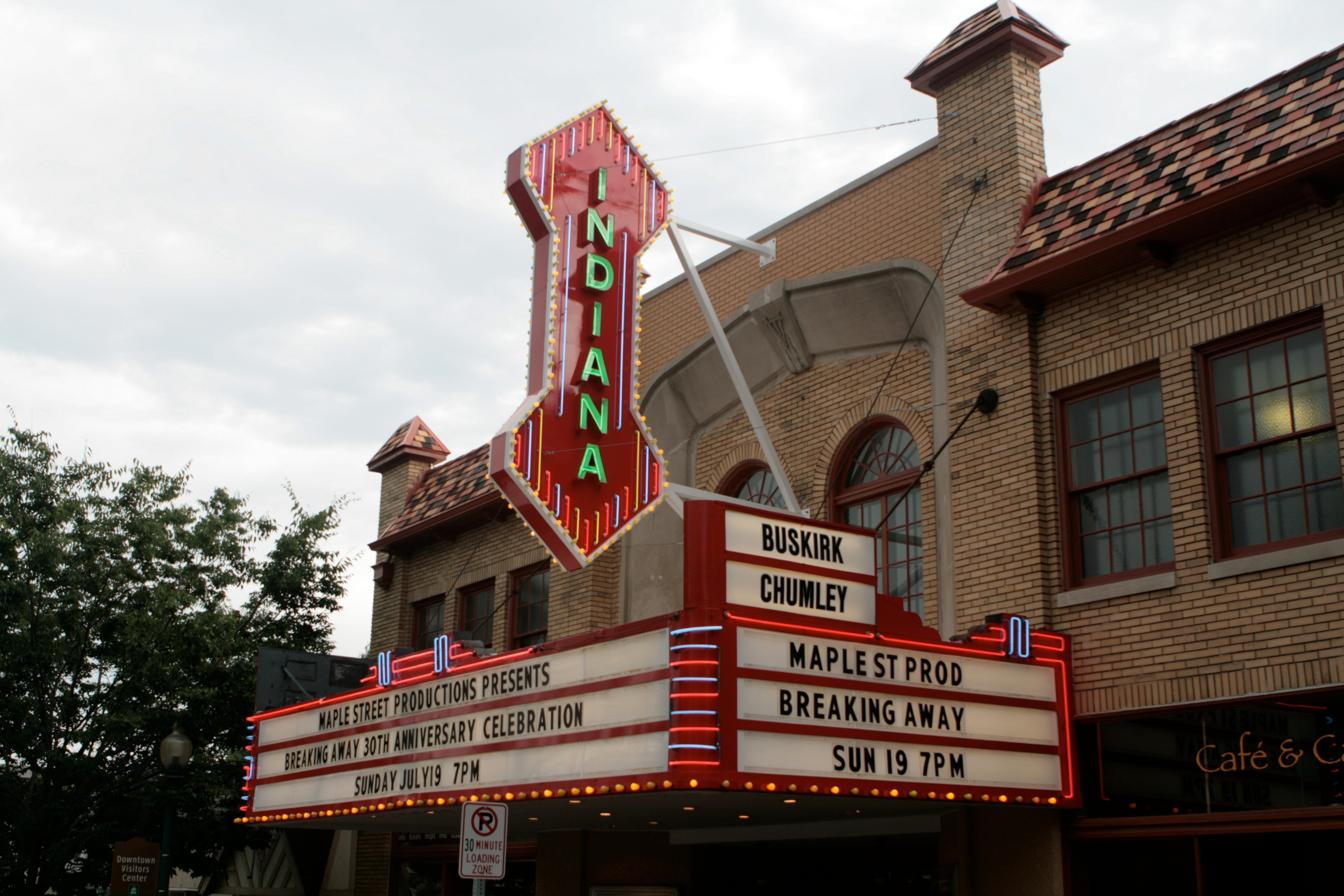

The Buskirk-Chumley Theater, formerly the Indiana Theater, is a historic theater in Bloomington, Indiana.

== History ==
The theater first opened on December 11, 1922, initially built for presenting vaudeville and silent films. More recently it was renovated for use as a performing arts venue. It hosts a variety of shows and performances. The theater is listed on the National Register of Historic Places. The theater is located in the Courthouse Square Historic District. The theater has a distinctive red neon marquee that says "Indiana".

The theater was built in Spanish mission revival architecture style and held 616 seats when it was built. It is known locally as the "Indiana Theater" or the "Bus-Chum". It was used as a movie theater until 1995 when it was donated to the community for use as a performing arts center.

The theater is located at 114 East Kirkwood Avenue.

== Website ==
- Buskirk-Chumley Theater website
