= Coca-Cola Bottling Plant (Bloomington, Indiana) =

- Coca-Cola Bottling Company Plant
- U.S. National Register of Historic Places
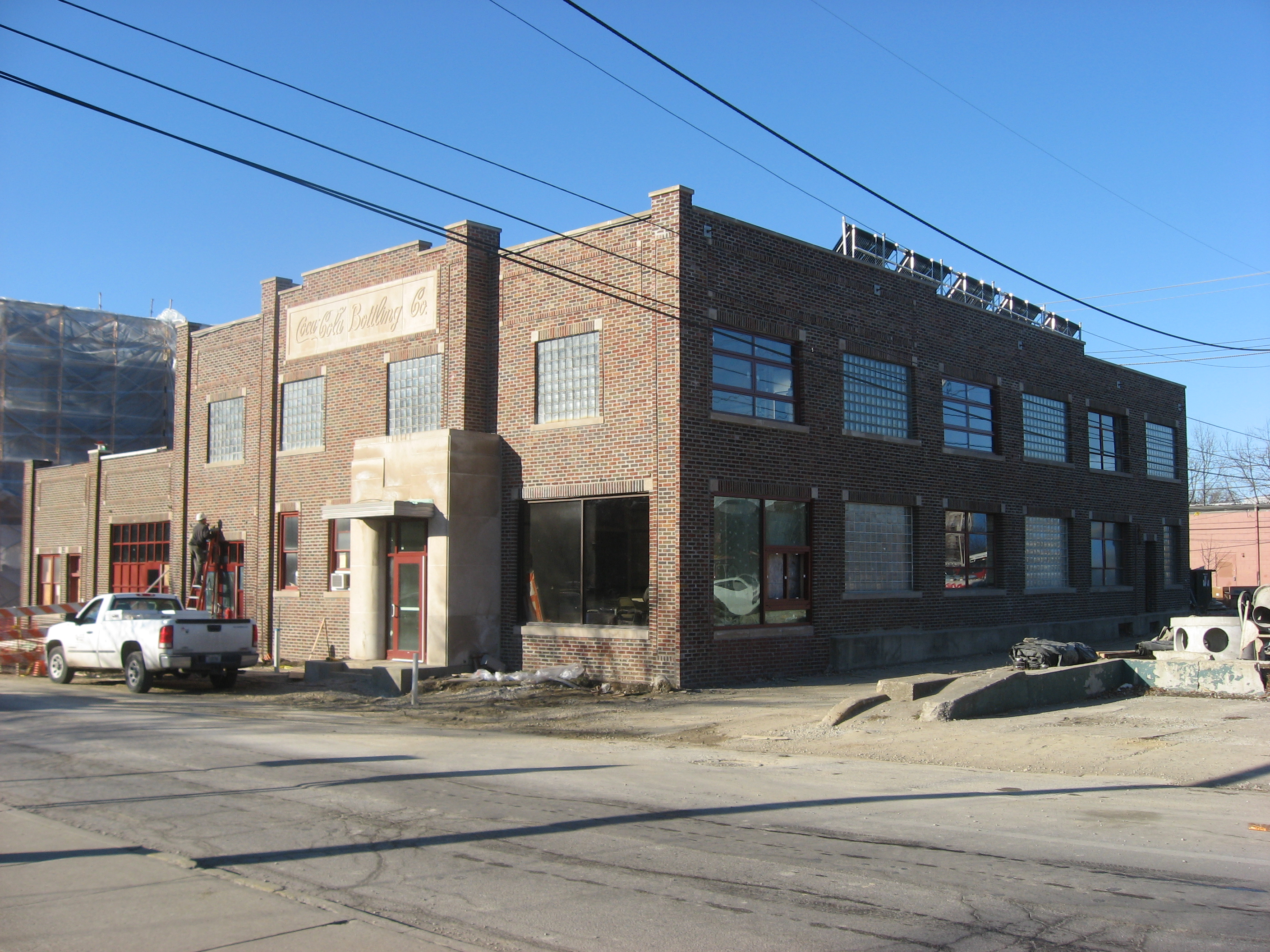
- Coca-Cola Bottling Company Plant, March 2010

- Location within Indiana Location within the United States
- Location: 318 S. Washington St., Bloomington, Indiana
- Coordinates: 39°9′50″N 86°31′57″W
- Area: Less than 1 acre (0.40 ha)
- Built: 1924, 1938-1939
- Architectural style: Early Commercial, Art Deco
- NRHP reference No.: 00000206
- Added to NRHP: March 15, 2000

Coca-Cola Bottling Company Plant is a historic bottling plant located in Bloomington, Indiana, United States. The original section of the Coca-Cola plant was built in 1924, and is a two-story, roughly square, red brick building. A one-story section was added in a renovation of 1938–1939, along with Art Deco style design elements on the original building. It closed as a bottling plant in 1989, and subsequently converted for commercial uses.

It was listed on the National Register of Historic Places in 2000.

== See also ==
- List of Coca-Cola buildings and structures
- National Register of Historic Places listings in Monroe County, Indiana
