= Princess Theatre (Bloomington, Indiana) =

- U.S. National Register of Historic Places
- U.S. Historic district – Contributing property
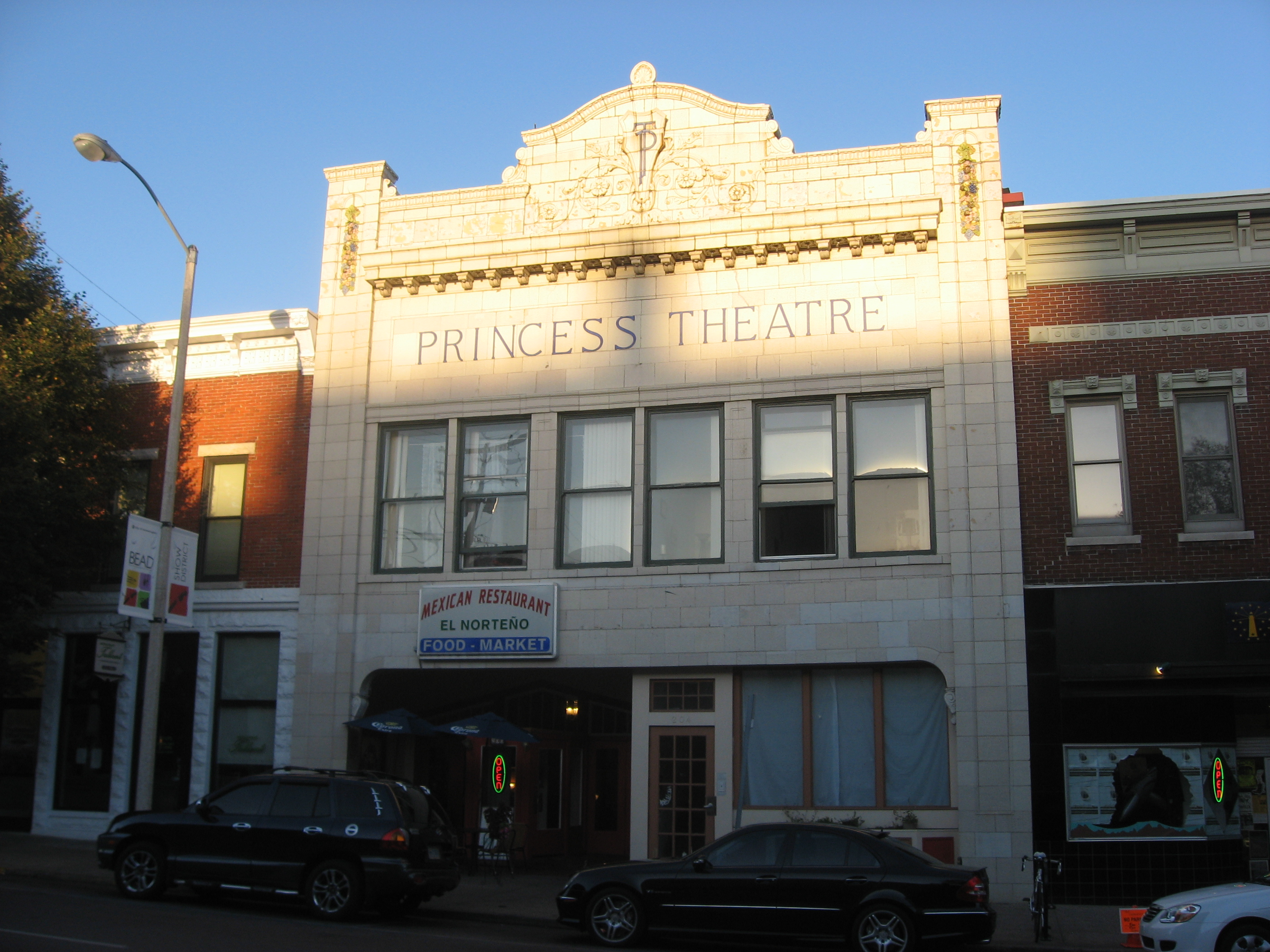
- Princess Theatre, September 2010

- Location within Indiana Location within the United States
- Location: 206 N. Walnut St., Bloomington, Indiana
- Coordinates: 39°9′32″N 86°31′59″W
- Area: less than one acre
- Built: 1892, 1913, 1923
- Architect: Nichols, John
- NRHP reference No.: 83000112
- Added to NRHP: June 16, 1983

Princess Theatre, also known as the Princess Theatre Building, is a historic theatre building located at Bloomington, Indiana. It was built in 1892, and converted and enlarged for use as a theater in 1913. It was subsequently refurbished to its present appearance in 1923. It is a two-story, rectangular, brick building with a glazed terra cotta front. The front facade features full-height pilasters and an arched opening with decorative brackets. The theater portion of the building was removed in 1985.

It was listed on the National Register of Historic Places in 1983. It is located in the Courthouse Square Historic District.
