= Cochran–Helton–Lindley House =

Historic house in Indiana, United States

- U.S. National Register of Historic Places
- U.S. Historic district – Contributing property
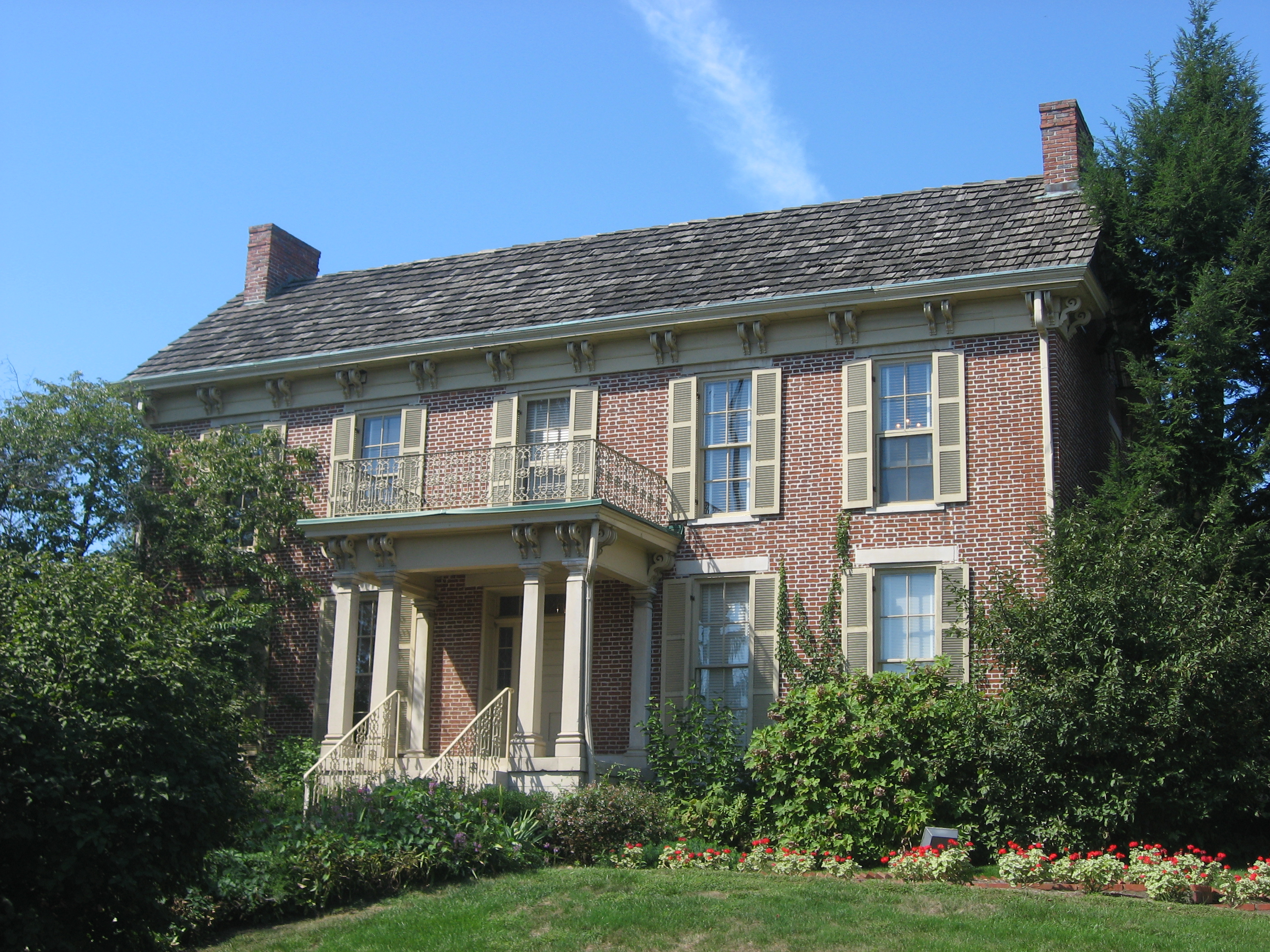
- Cochran-Helton-Lindley House, September 2010

- Location within Indiana Location within the United States
- Location: 405 N. Rogers St., Bloomington, Indiana
- Coordinates: 39°10′11″N 86°32′20″W
- Area: 0.6 acres (0.24 ha)
- Built: 1849-1850
- Architectural style: Greek Revival
- NRHP reference No.: 79000010
- Added to NRHP: June 20, 1979

Cochran–Helton–Lindley House, also known as the Helton–Lindley House and James Cochran House, is a historic home located at Bloomington, Monroe County, Indiana. It was built in 1849–1850, and is a two-story, five-bay, L-shaped, Greek Revival style brick dwelling. It has a two-story rear ell with an enclosed two-story porch. Its main entrance is framed by a transom and sidelights and features a porch with square columns and pilasters. It was the home of Indiana Governor Paris Dunning in 1869–1870. The house was renovated in 1976.

It was listed on the National Register of Historic Places in 1979. It is located in the Bloomington West Side Historic District.
