= Johnson's Creamery =

- U.S. National Register of Historic Places
- U.S. Historic district – Contributing property
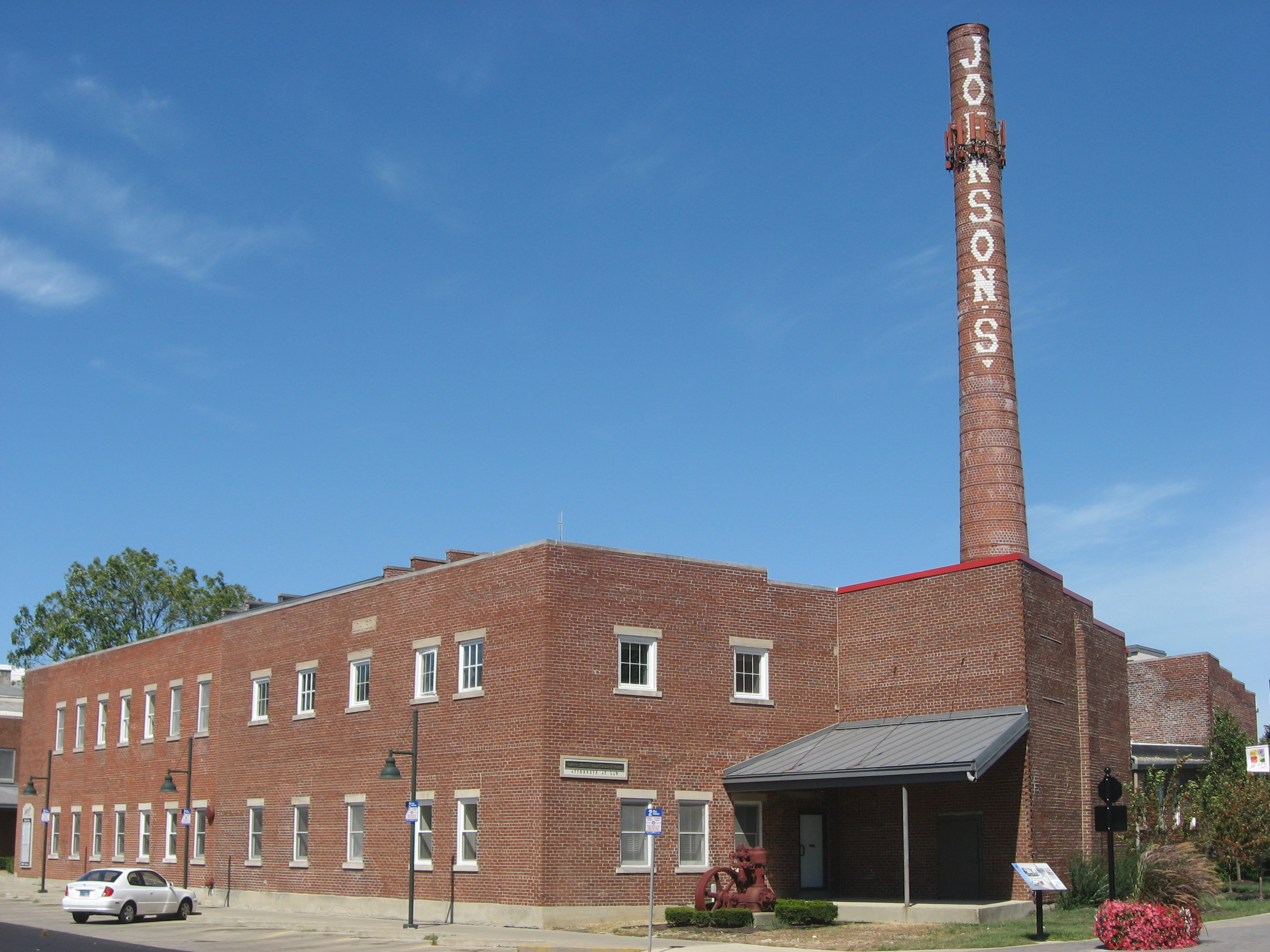
- Johnson's Creamery, September 2010

- Location within Indiana Location within the United States
- Location: 400 W. Seventh St., Bloomington, Indiana
- Coordinates: 39°10′8″N 86°32′14″W
- Area: less than one acre
- Built: 1914
- NRHP reference No.: 96000284
- Added to NRHP: March 14, 1996

Johnson's Creamery is a historic creamery building located at Bloomington, Indiana. The original section was built about 1914, and is a two-story, rectangular, red brick building. Additions were made to the original building until 1951, and are all constructed of red brick with parapets. The iconic smokestack dates to 1949. Johnson's Creamery vacated the building in 1987.

It was listed on the National Register of Historic Places in 1996. It is located in the Bloomington West Side Historic District.
