= Bloomington City Hall =

- Waldron Arts Center
- U.S. National Register of Historic Places
- U.S. Historic district – Contributing property
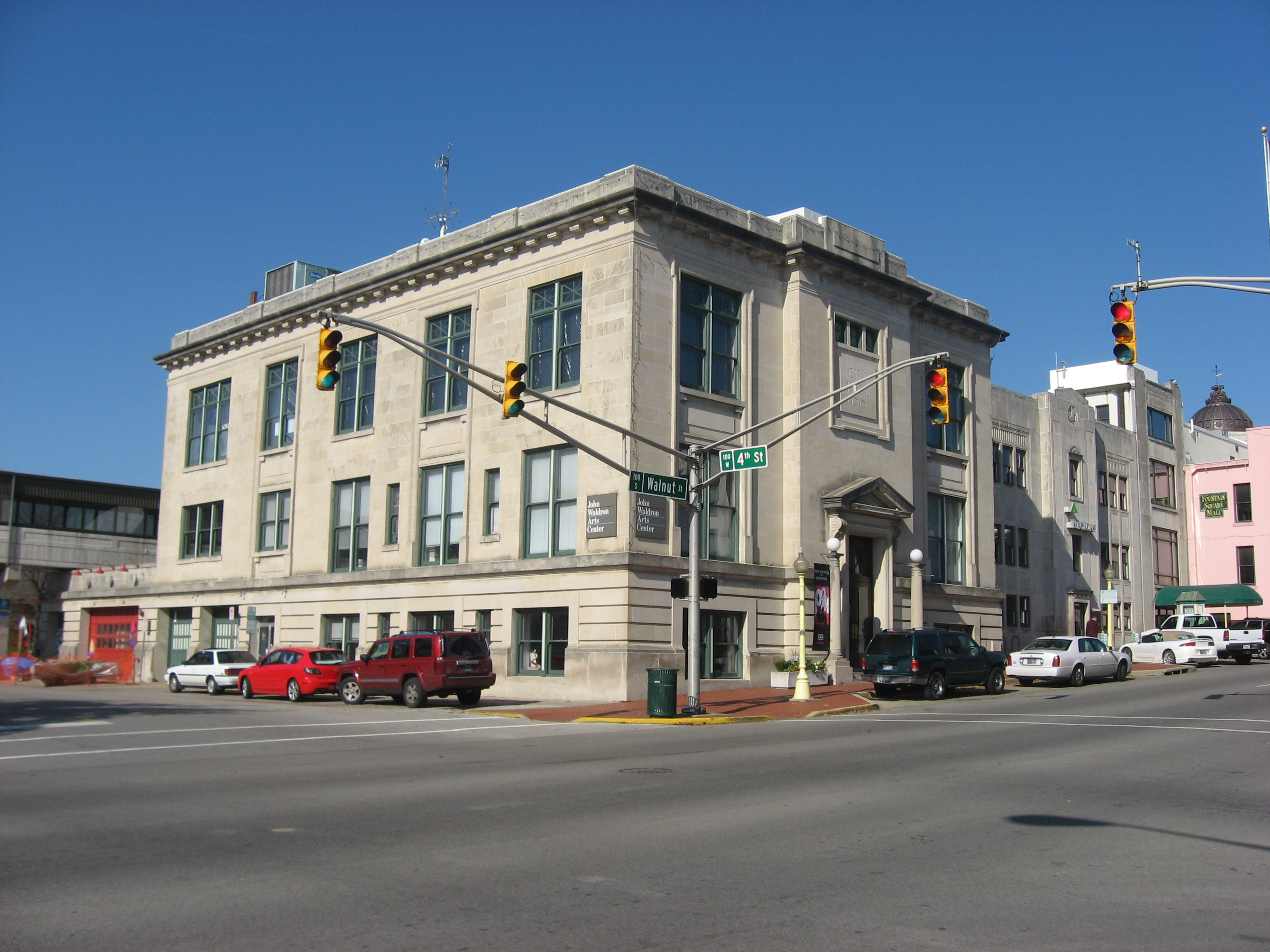
- Old City Hall, November 2009

- Location within Indiana Location within the United States
- Location: 122 S. Walnut St., Bloomington, Indiana
- Coordinates: 39°9′57″N 86°32′2″W
- Built: 1915
- Architect: Riedel, Frank P.; Nichols, John Lincoln
- Architectural style: Beaux Arts
- NRHP reference No.: 89001413
- Added to NRHP: September 14, 1989

Waldron Arts Center, also known as the Old City Hall and Fire Station, is a historic city hall located at Bloomington, Indiana. It was built in 1915, and is a three-story rectangular Beaux-Arts style limestone building. Additions were made in 1950 and 1972. It features a modest entrance portico.

It was listed on the National Register of Historic Places in 1989. It is located in the Courthouse Square Historic District.

== See also ==
- List of mayors of Bloomington, Indiana
