= John L. Nichols House =

Historic house in Indiana, United States

- J.L. Nichols House and Studio
- U.S. National Register of Historic Places
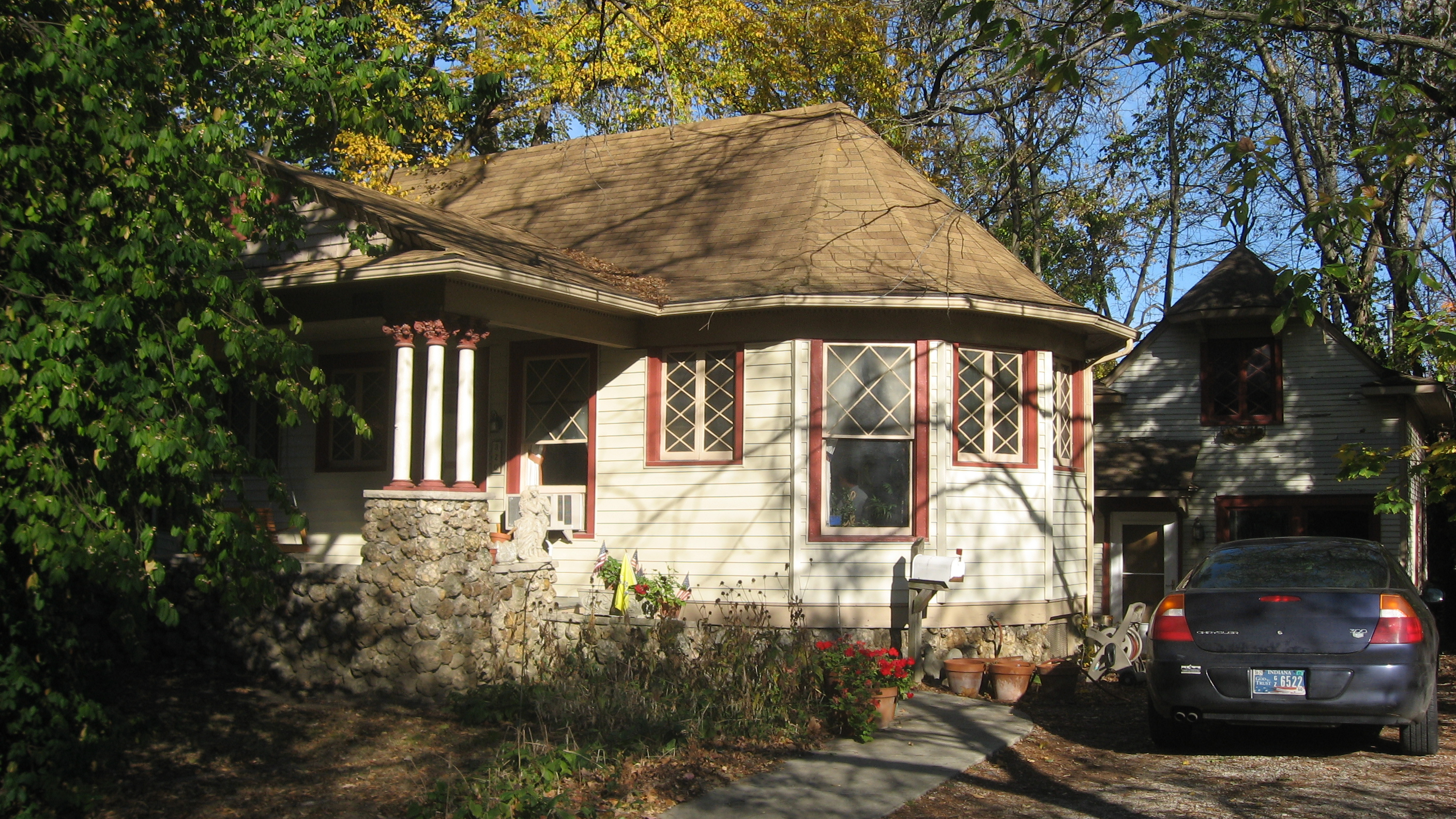
- Front of the house

- Location within Indiana Location within the United States
- Location: 820 N. College Ave., Bloomington, Indiana
- Coordinates: 39°10′28″N 86°32′3″W
- Area: Less than 1 acre (4,000 m^{2})
- Built: 1900
- Architect: John L. Nichols
- Architectural style: Late Victorian
- NRHP reference No.: 84001207
- Added to NRHP: September 27, 1984

The John L. Nichols House is a historic former residence in Bloomington, Indiana, United States. Built in a late variety of the Victorian style of architecture, it was constructed in 1900. Once the home of Bloomington's leading architect, it is no longer a residence, but it has been designated a historic site.

== History ==
Born in Bloomington in 1859, John L. Nichols was the first architect to practice in the city, and the only one active in the city for much of his life. As a leading member of local society, he was commissioned to design many city buildings in the late nineteenth and early twentieth centuries; for example, he and his company produced over six hundred designs in 1908 alone. Many of the most prominent structures on Courthouse Square downtown are his work. However, he refused to limit himself to large-scale commercial construction: among his most prominent works is the Batman-Waldron House of 1895, which a local historic preservation survey has described as the city's "most eccentric mansion." Smaller residences were also within his purview; in 1902, he published a complete book of residential designs, many of which combined elements from the Neoclassical, Queen Anne, Romanesque Revival, and Stick styles to produce a distinctive and popular style that local historians have called "Free Classic."

One of the buildings that Nichols held up as a leading example of his architectural ideals was the home that he designed for himself and his wife along College Avenue north of downtown. After building it in 1900, he made extensive use of it in his book as a demonstration of his theories of architecture.

Nichols moved out of his new house just two years after its completion, but he maintained ownership until selling it in 1905 to the Indianapolis Southern Railroad, which at that time was engaged in the construction of a railroad line adjacent to the property. Except for twelve years as the home of a local railroad employee, the house was little used by the railroad. In 1940, the house was sold by the railroad, which had become subsumed into the Illinois Central; from this point to the present, it has been bought and sold by many different parties. Throughout the later twentieth century, the house gradually deteriorated, but by the 1980s it had been purchased by a new owner who began to restore the property to its original state.

== Architecture ==
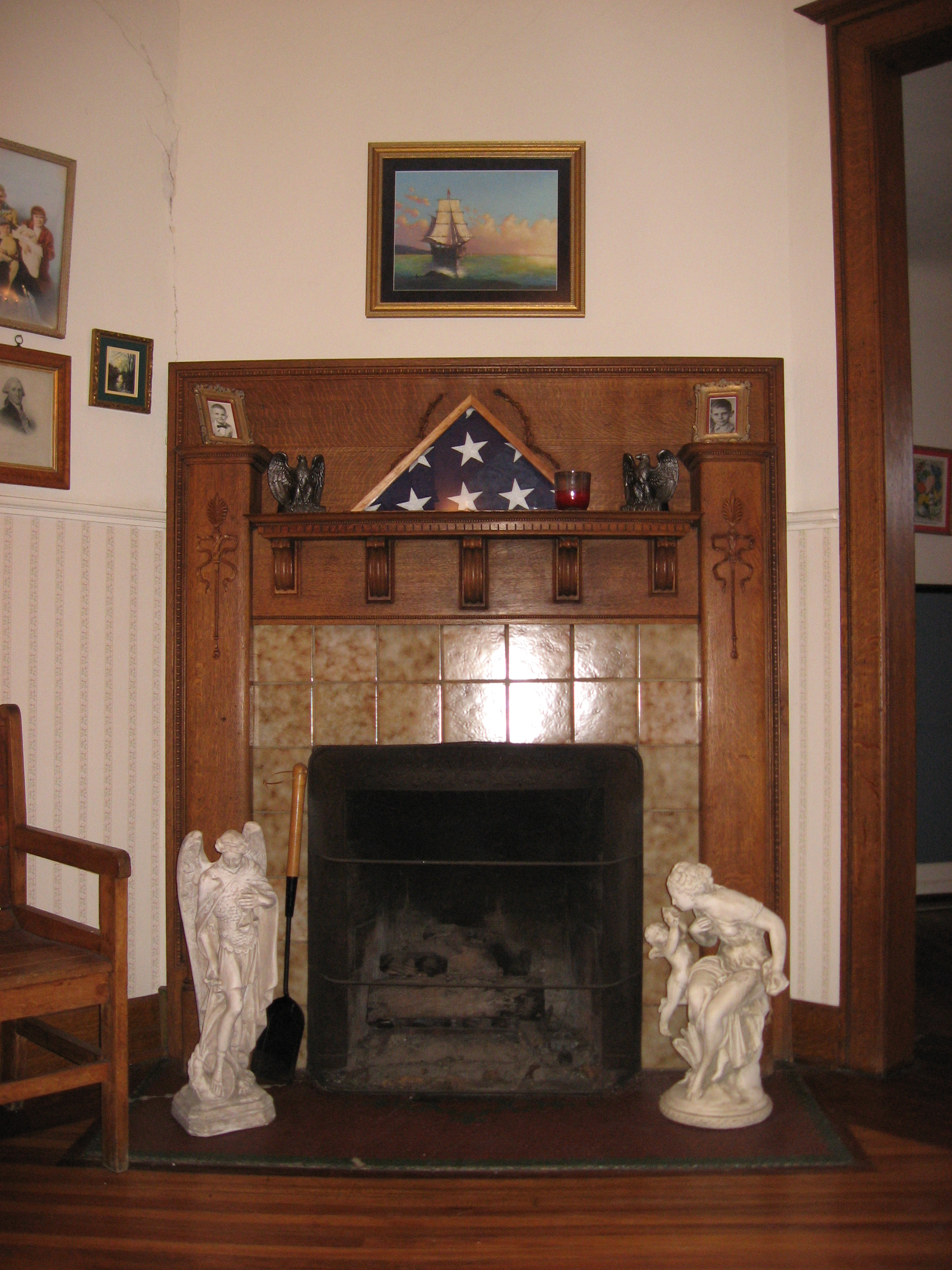
Living room with fireplace

Characteristic of its designer, the Nichols House is a mix of architectural styles. Some of its elements are meant to recall the architecture of Ancient Greek temples, such as the Corinthian columns that support the roof of the entrance porch. A distinctive and unique design element is the stonework supporting the columns: rather than the dressed limestone that he used in many of his larger buildings, it is composed of small limestone geodes; almost no other Bloomington buildings employ these stones architecturally, even though they occur in large numbers in the city's vicinity. Other geodes were formerly used to support the chimney and as landscaping, although many of these have disappeared.

The house itself features an unusual floor plan with vaguely elliptical ends: the west-facing front is linear, the east-facing rear encompasses an ell, and both the northern and southern ends are pentagonally shaped instead of flat. Just one story tall, the Nichols House is divided into five rooms with a basement; its frame structure is covered by clapboard siding. The cedar shingled roof has been replaced by one of fiberglass; both the original and the replacement were hipped except for the gabled roofs of the porch and the rear ell.

Inside, oak and walnut panelling covers most of the walls, and the floors are made of cherry. Among the other original elements is the fireplace, which retains the hearth that it had at its original construction. The interior is lit by multiple large windows, a disproportionate number of which are located in the pentagonal ends of the building; although some are casements and others sash windows, all are divided into many small diamond shapes, following a pattern than Nichols employed in many of his designs.

== Related buildings ==
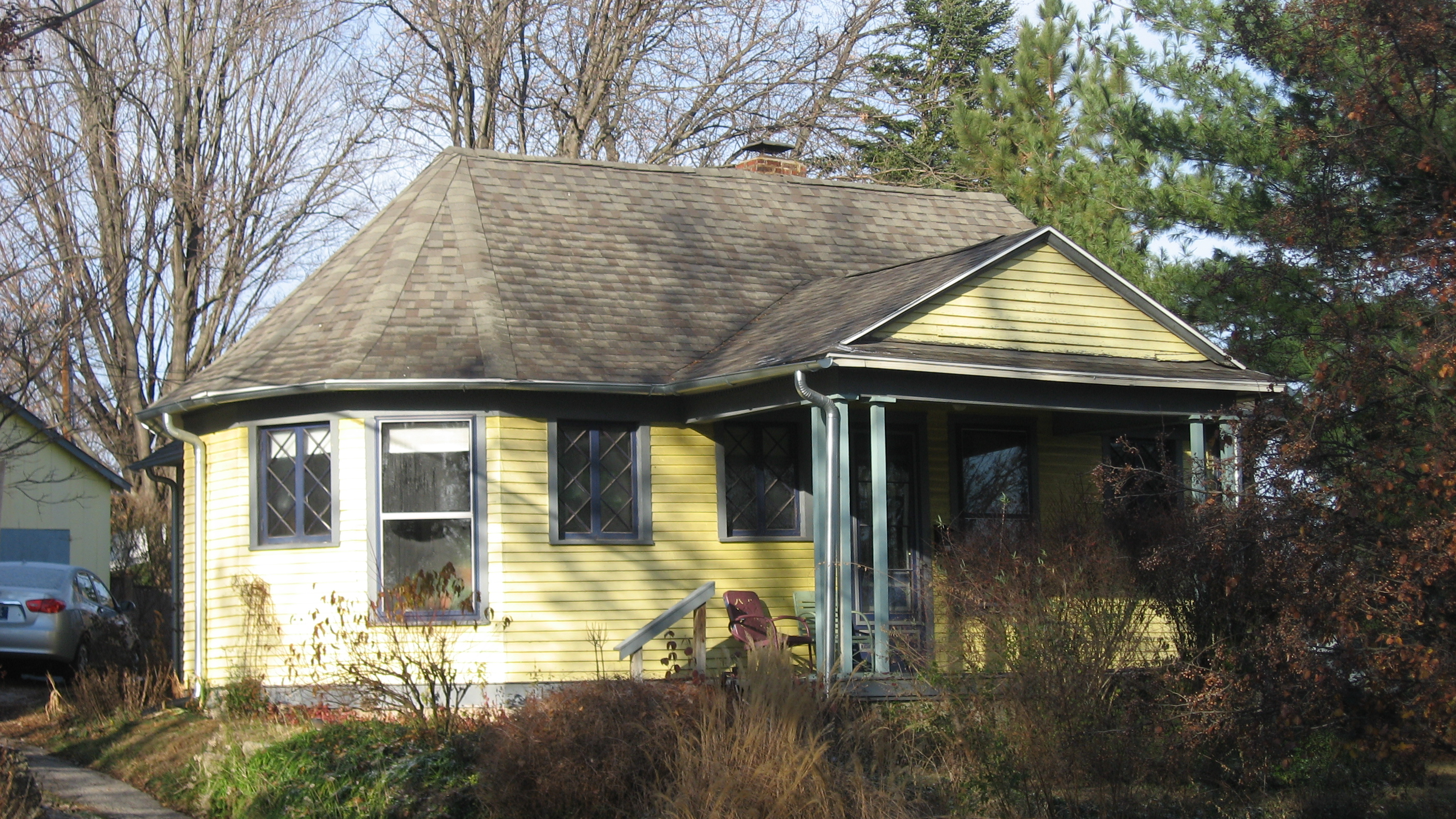
Similar house in Prospect Hill

Located just behind Nichols' house is his studio, a separate two-story building constructed in a manner similar to that of the house. It is a significantly simpler building than the house, featuring an open floor plan with simple and unadorned construction. In the past, the studio declined with the house, but it was ignored as the house was restored to its original state.

Although not owned by Nichols, a residence similar to the present house is located along Rogers Street in the neighborhood of Prospect Hill. Situated near four other Nichols designs, this house is essentially a mirror image of Nichols' own home; both are clapboard buildings with central entryways and octagonal wings.

== Recognition ==
In late 1984, the John L. Nichols house was listed on the National Register of Historic Places, qualifying both because of its distinctive historic architecture and because of its connection to Nichols. Although the National Register called the property the "J.L. Nichols House and Studio," only the house itself was considered a contributing property. Like several other Nichols designs, the house has been given the status of Bloomington Historic Designation, and the 2004 City of Bloomington Interim Report, a historic preservation survey, deemed it the single most important part of the locally designated Illinois Central Railroad and North College Historic District.

Today, the house is used as the office of a locally owned law firm.
