= Millen-Chase-McCalla House =

Historic house in Indiana, United States

- U.S. National Register of Historic Places
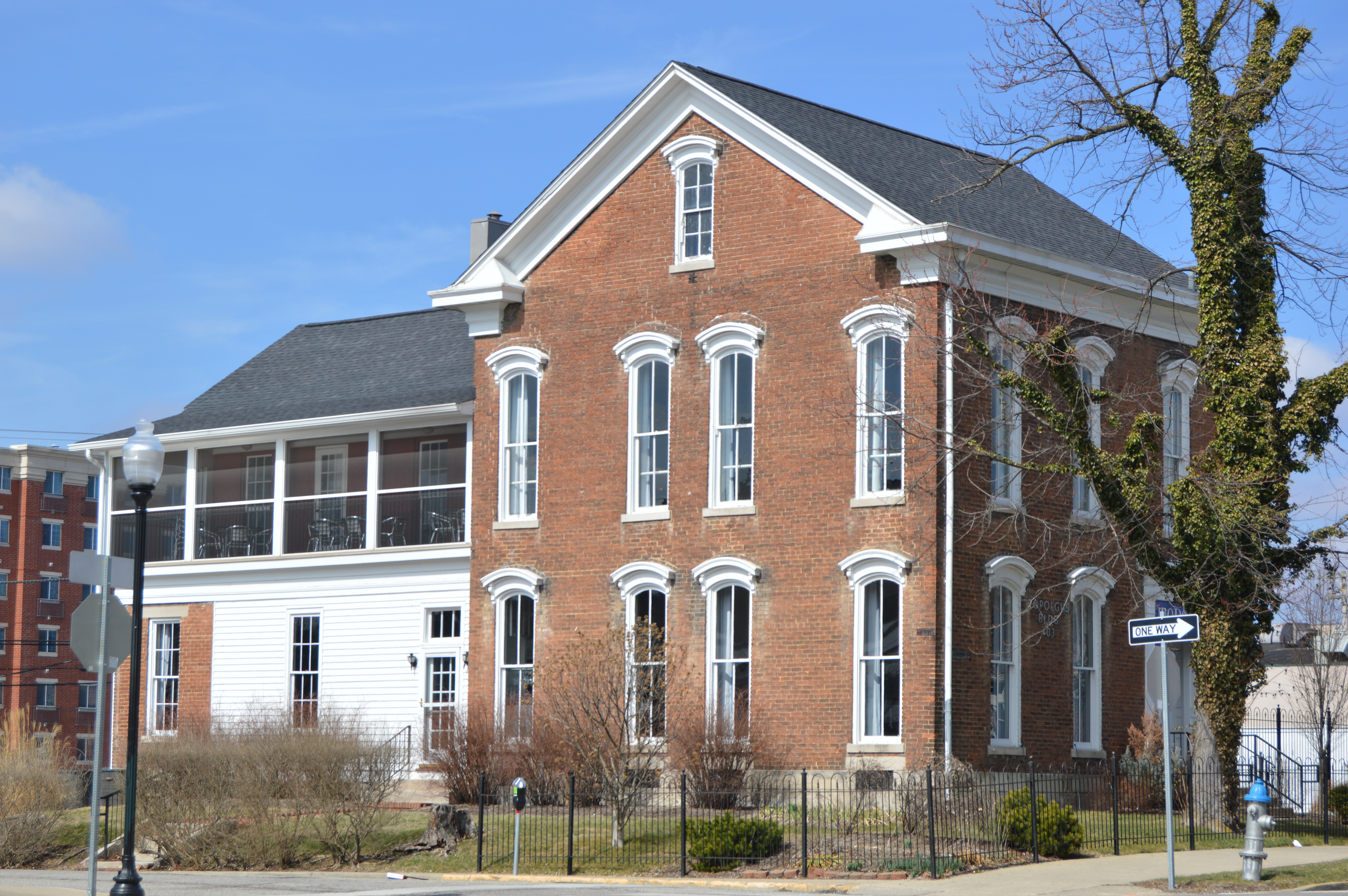
- Millen-Chase-McCalla House, March 2016

- Location within Indiana Location within the United States
- Location: 403 N. Walnut St., Bloomington, Indiana
- Coordinates: 39°10′11″N 86°32′02″W
- Area: Less than 1 acre (0.40 ha)
- Built: 1844, 1854, 1871, c. 1935
- Built by: Millen, William; Chase, Aaron; McCalla, John
- Architectural style: Greek Revival, Italianate, Two-thirds I-house, Bungalow/craftsman
- NRHP reference No.: 14000076
- Added to NRHP: March 26, 2014

Millen-Chase-McCalla House, also known as the Topolgus Building, is a historic home located at Bloomington, Indiana. The original section was built in 1844, and now forms the two-story brick rear wing. The two-story, brick main section was added in 1854, to form a two-thirds I-house. The house was remodeled in 1871 in a combination of Greek Revival and Italianate style architecture. It rests on a limestone foundation and has a side-gable roof. The interior has undergone renovation for commercial uses a number of times; in 2011 it was rehabilitated for use as a restaurant.

It was listed on the National Register of Historic Places in 2014.
