= Hinkle–Garton Farmstead =

- U.S. National Register of Historic Places
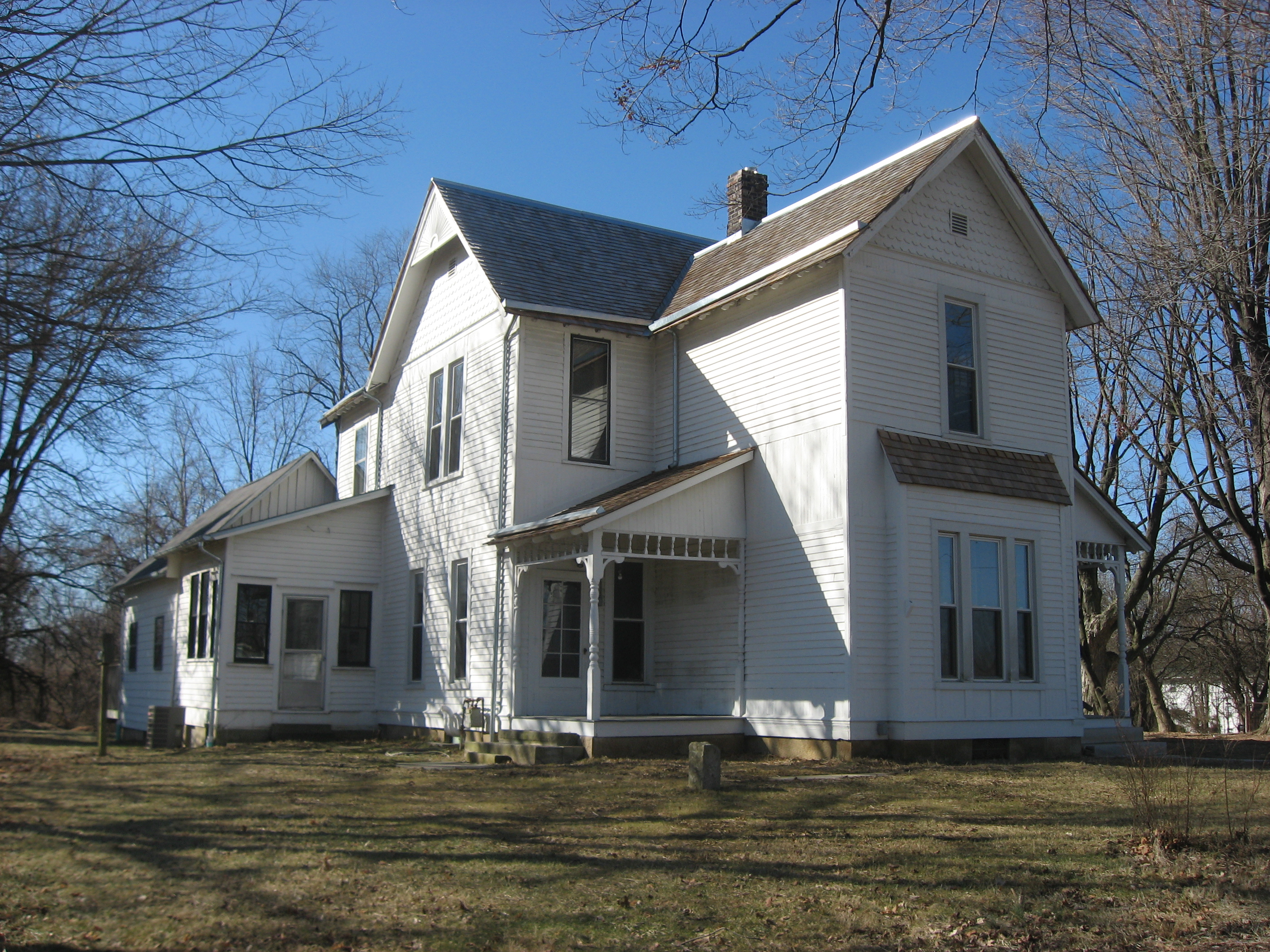
- Hinkle–Garton farmhouse, March 2010

- Location within Indiana Location within the United States
- Location: 2920 E. 10th St., Bloomington, Indiana
- Coordinates: 39°10′11″N 86°32′20″W
- Area: 11.1 acres (4.5 ha)
- Architectural style: Queen Anne, et al.
- NRHP reference No.: 07000282
- Added to NRHP: April 12, 2007

Hinkle–Garton Farmstead is a historic home and farm located at Bloomington, Indiana. The farmhouse was built in 1892, and is a two-story, "T"-plan, Queen Anne style frame dwelling. It has a cross-gable roof and rests on a stone foundation. Also on the property are the contributing 1 1/2-story gabled ell house (c. 1910), blacksmith shop (1901), garage (c. 1920, 932), a large barn (1928), and grain crib.

It was listed on the National Register of Historic Places in 2007.
