= Home Laundry Company =

- U.S. National Register of Historic Places
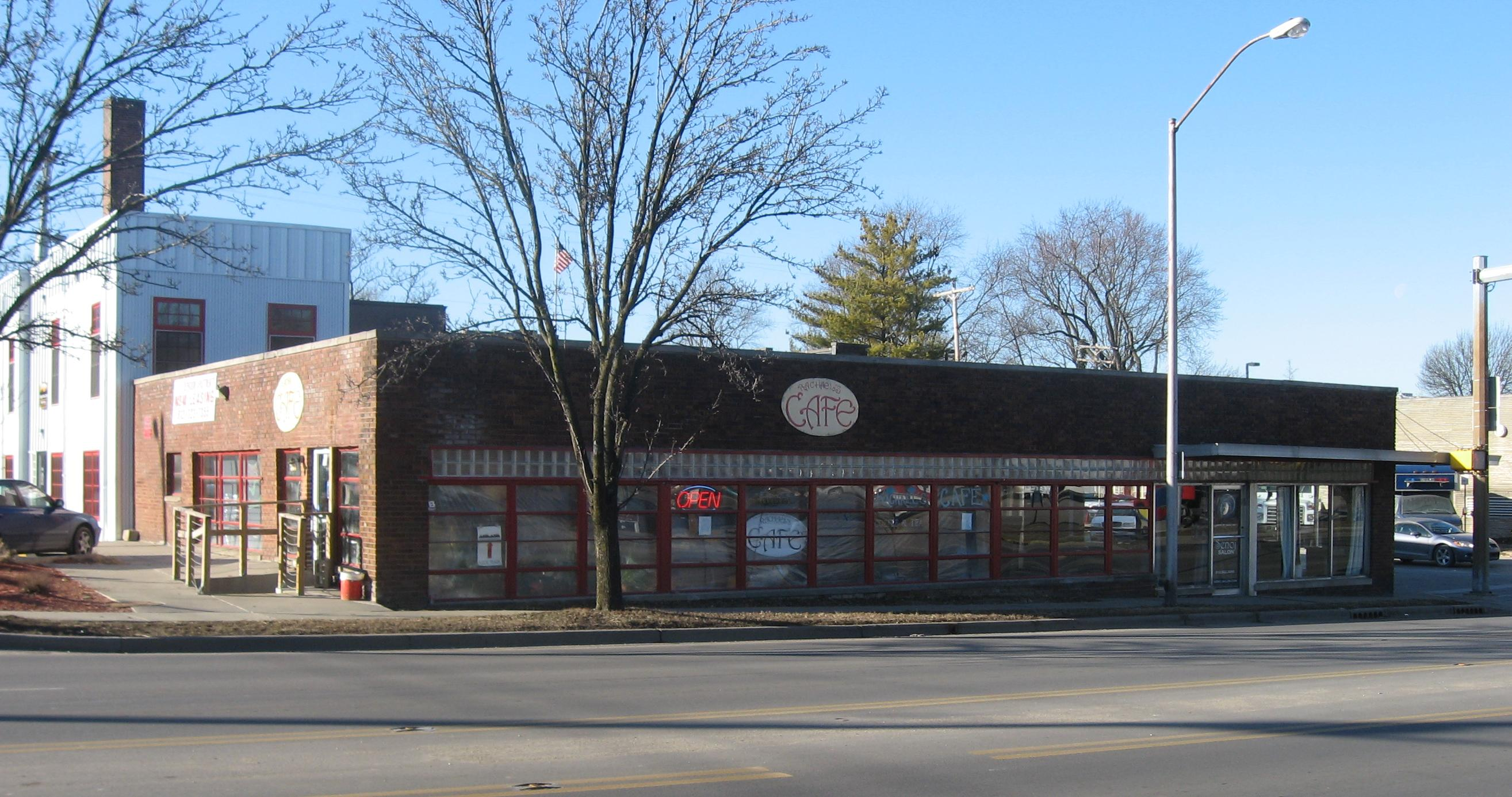
- Home Laundry Company, March 2010

- Location within Indiana Location within the United States
- Location: 300 E 3rd St., Bloomington, Indiana
- Coordinates: 39°9′52″N 86°31′50″W
- Area: less than one acre
- Built: 1922, 1947-1948
- Architect: Harlos, Cecil
- Architectural style: Early Commercial, Moderne
- NRHP reference No.: 00000208
- Added to NRHP: March 15, 2000

Home Laundry Company is a historic laundry building located at Bloomington, Indiana, United States. The original section was built in 1922, and is a two-story, roughly square, red brick building. A one-story Moderne style wraparound addition was built in 1947–1948. It continued to house a laundry when listed in 2000 and currently houses a Chinese restaurant.

It was listed on the National Register of Historic Places in 2000.
