= Cantol Wax Company Building =

- U.S. National Register of Historic Places
- U.S. Historic district – Contributing property
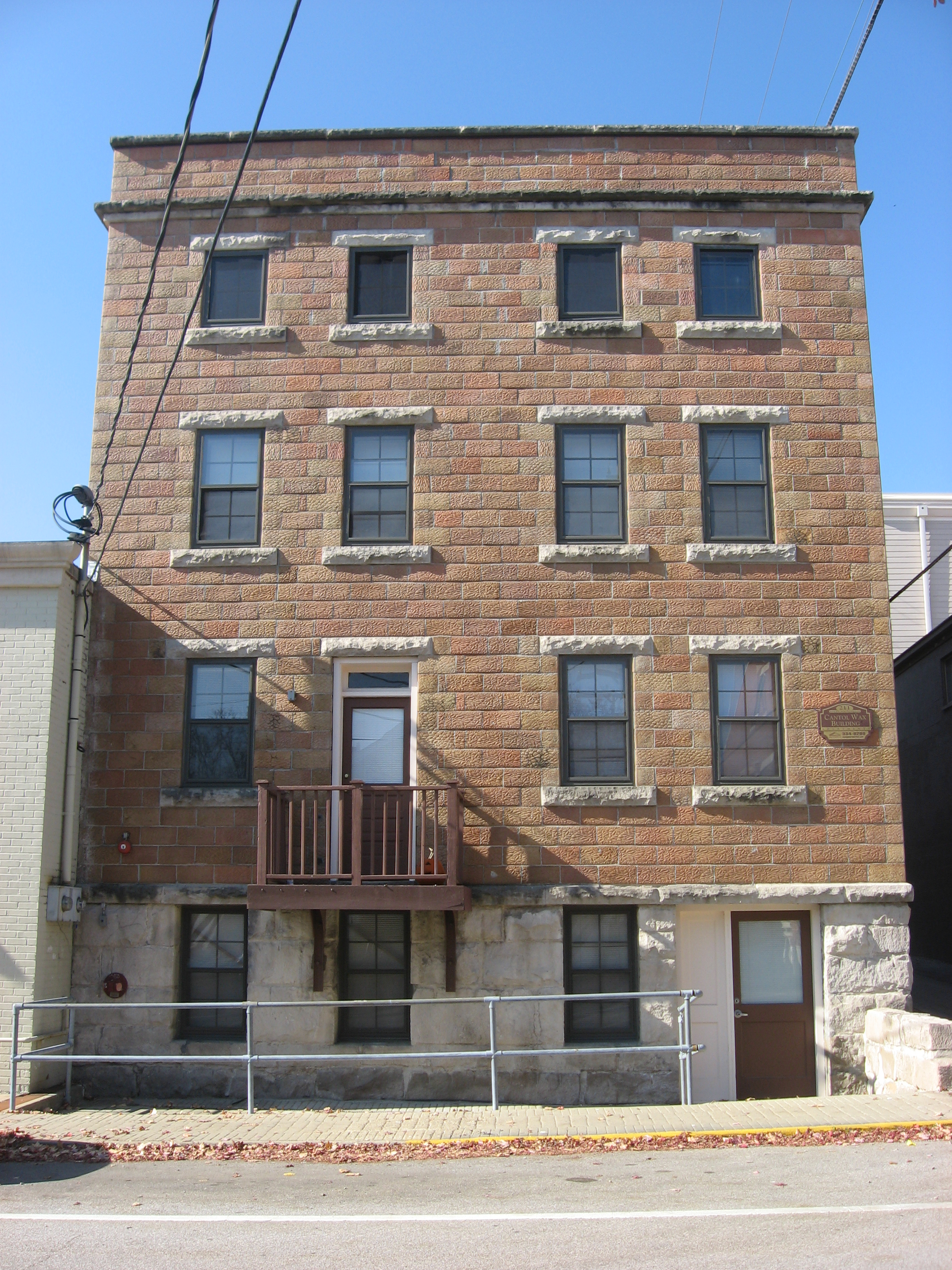
- Cantol Wax Company Building, November 2009

- Location within Indiana Location within the United States
- Location: 211 N. Washington St., Bloomington, Indiana
- Coordinates: 39°10′4″N 86°31′57″W
- Area: less than one acre
- Built: c. 1905-1907
- Architectural style: Classical Revival
- NRHP reference No.: 90000812
- Added to NRHP: May 24, 1990

Cantol Wax Company Building, also known as Oakes Manufacturing Company Building and Wylie's Furniture Warehouse, is a historic industrial / commercial building located at Bloomington, Indiana. It was built between about 1905 and 1907, and consists of a 3 1/2-story, rectangular, front section, and 2 1/2-story rear addition. The masonry building has a rubble limestone foundation, terra cotta block walls, and Classical Revival style design elements. It was originally constructed for the Oakes Manufacturing Company, then housed the Cantol Wax Company after 1920.

It was listed on the National Register of Historic Places in 1990. It is located in the Bloomington West Side Historic District.
