= Woolery Stone Company =

- U.S. National Register of Historic Places
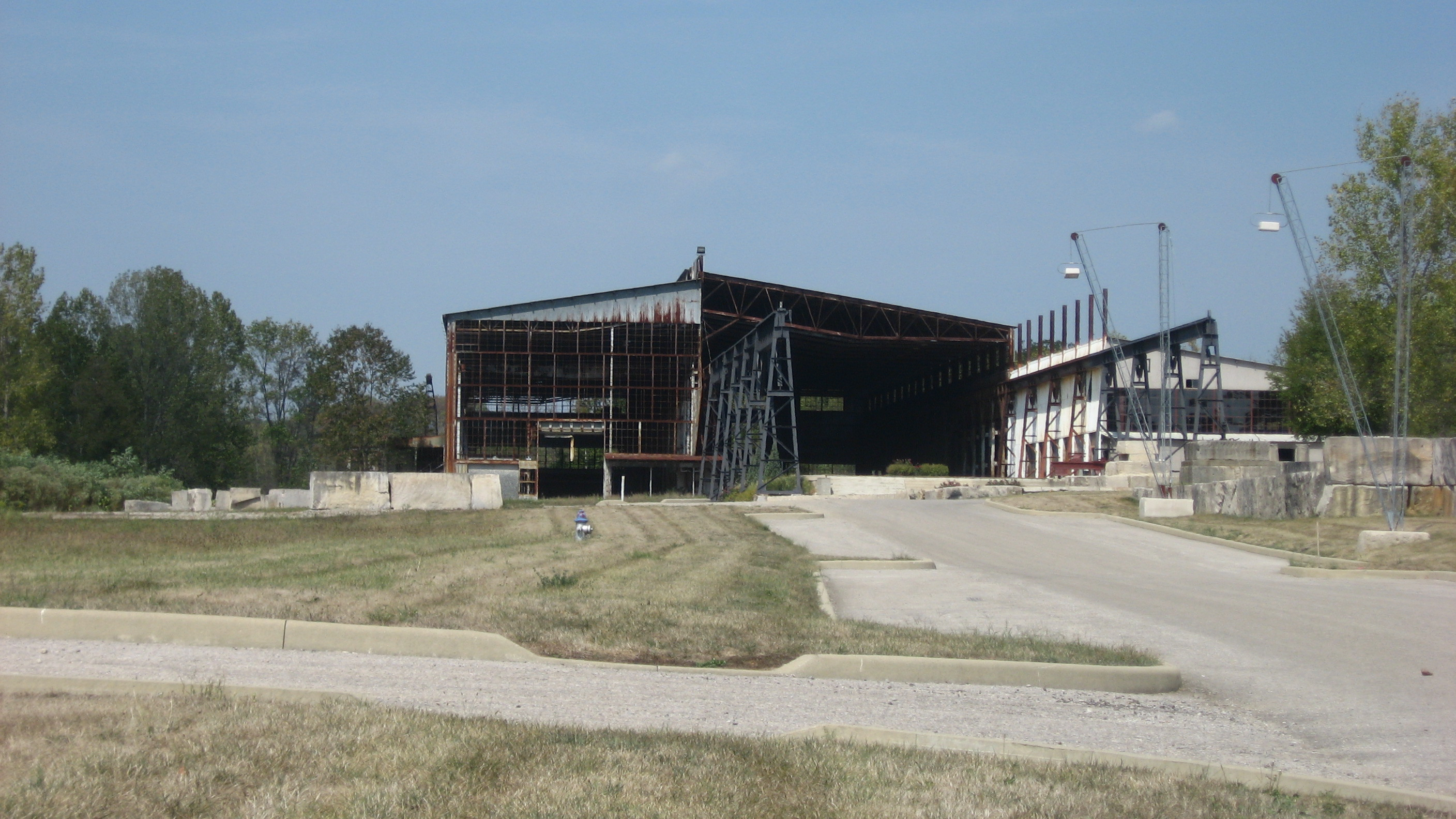
- Woolery Stone Company, September 2010

- Location within Indiana Location within the United States
- Location: 2295 W. Tapp Rd., Bloomington, Indiana
- Coordinates: 39°08′21″N 86°33′38″W
- Area: 28 acres (11 ha)
- Built: 1948, 1952, 1954
- Architectural style: International Style
- NRHP reference No.: 02001563
- Added to NRHP: December 20, 2002

Woolery Stone Company is a historic limestone quarry and manufacturing complex located at Bloomington, Indiana. The property includes a variety of buildings, structures, and objects associated with the production of dimensional limestone. These include the limestone faced International Style headquarters building, metal mill office, machine shop, blacksmith shop, limestone storage structure, limestone walls, and the grand scale all metal mill building.

It was listed on the National Register of Historic Places in 2002.
