= Bloomington, Indiana =

- City
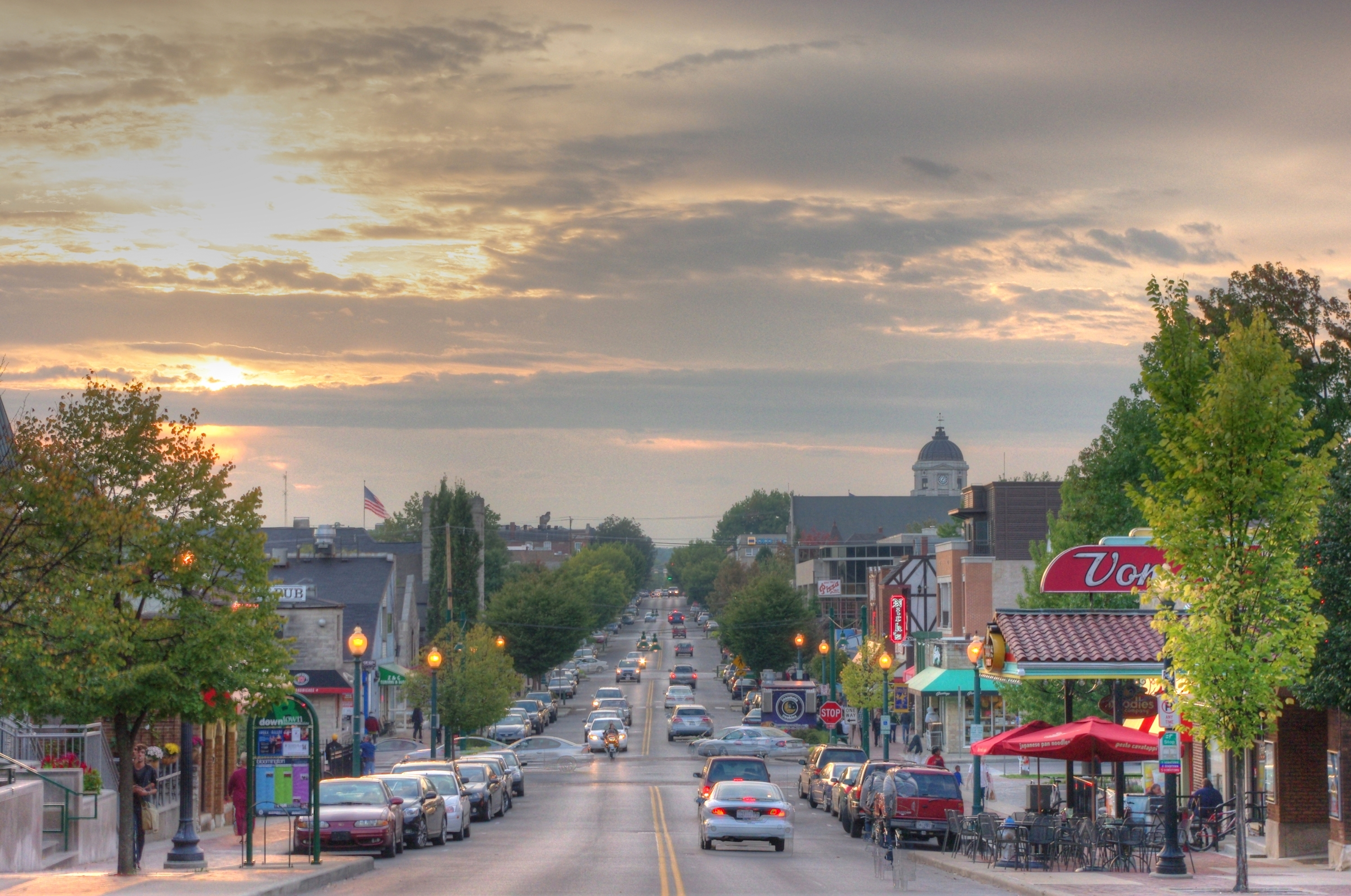
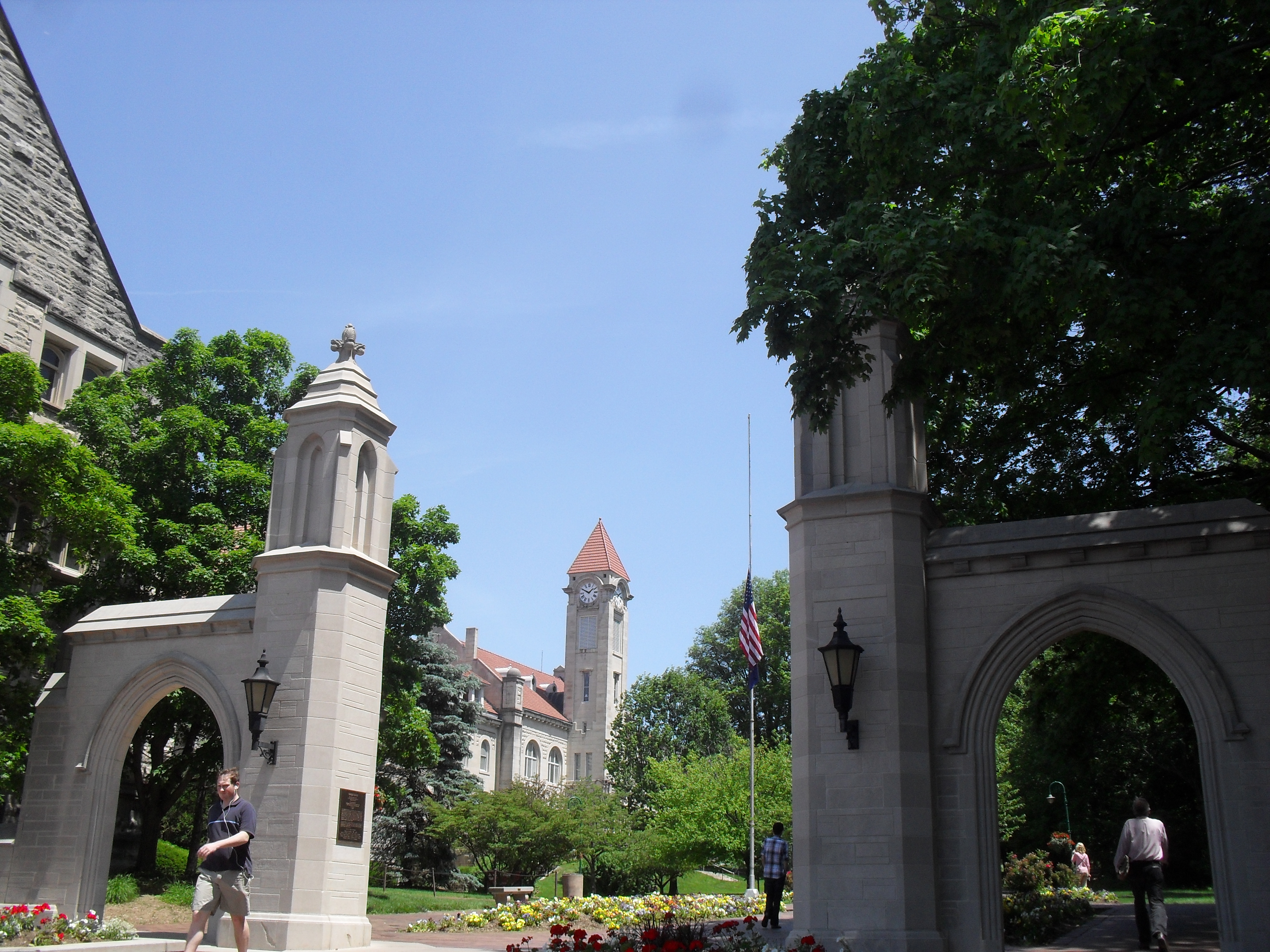
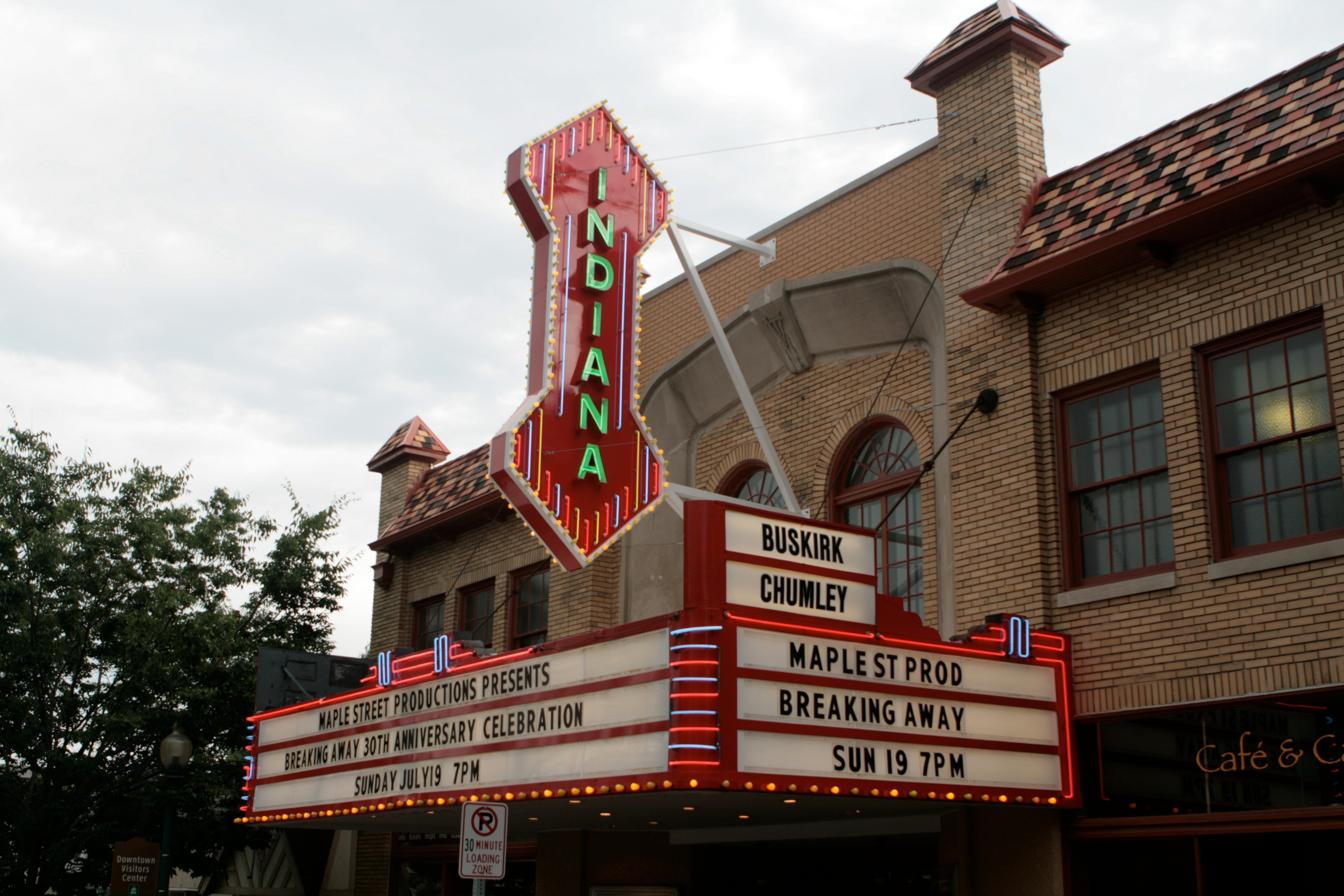
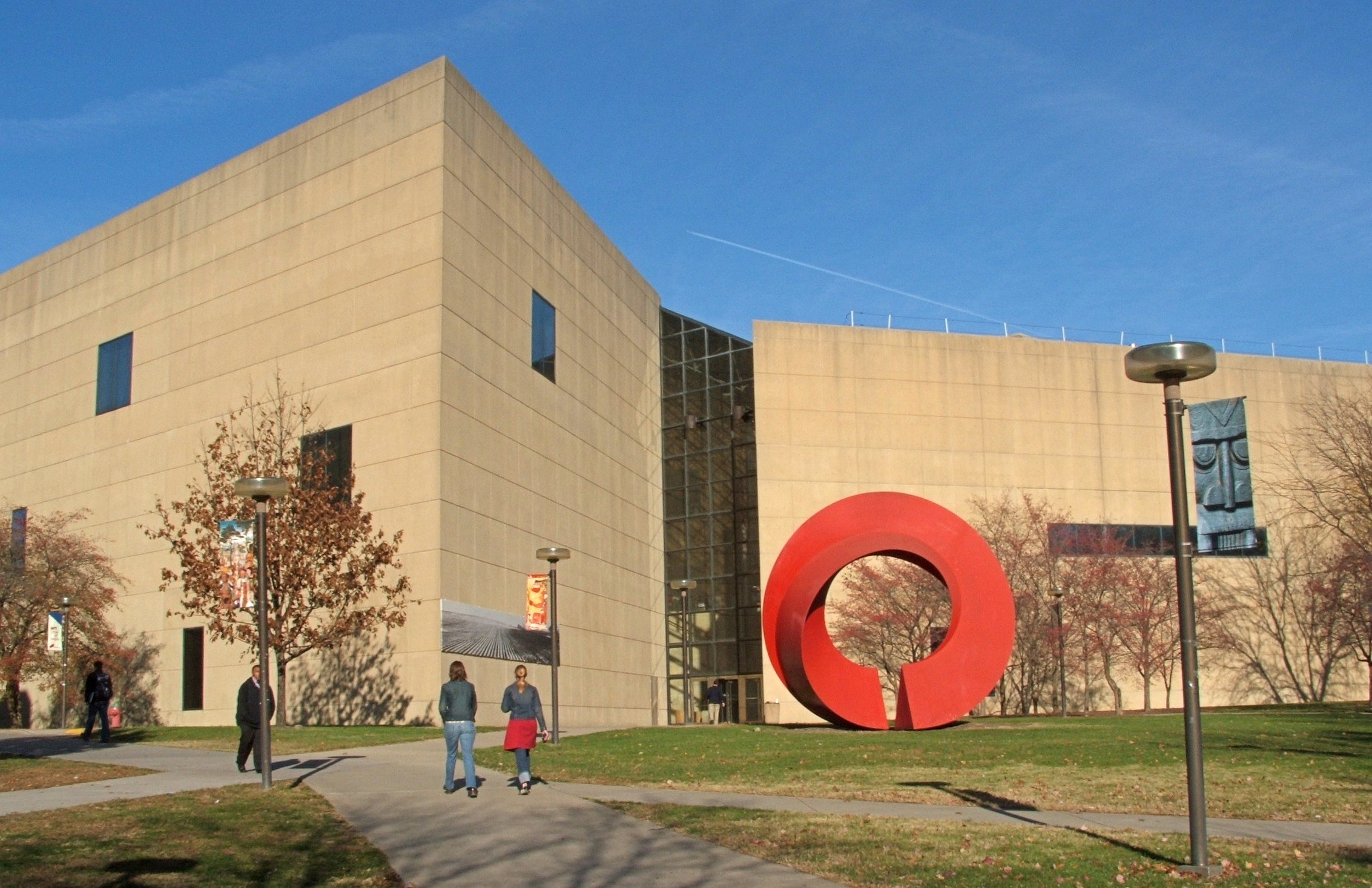
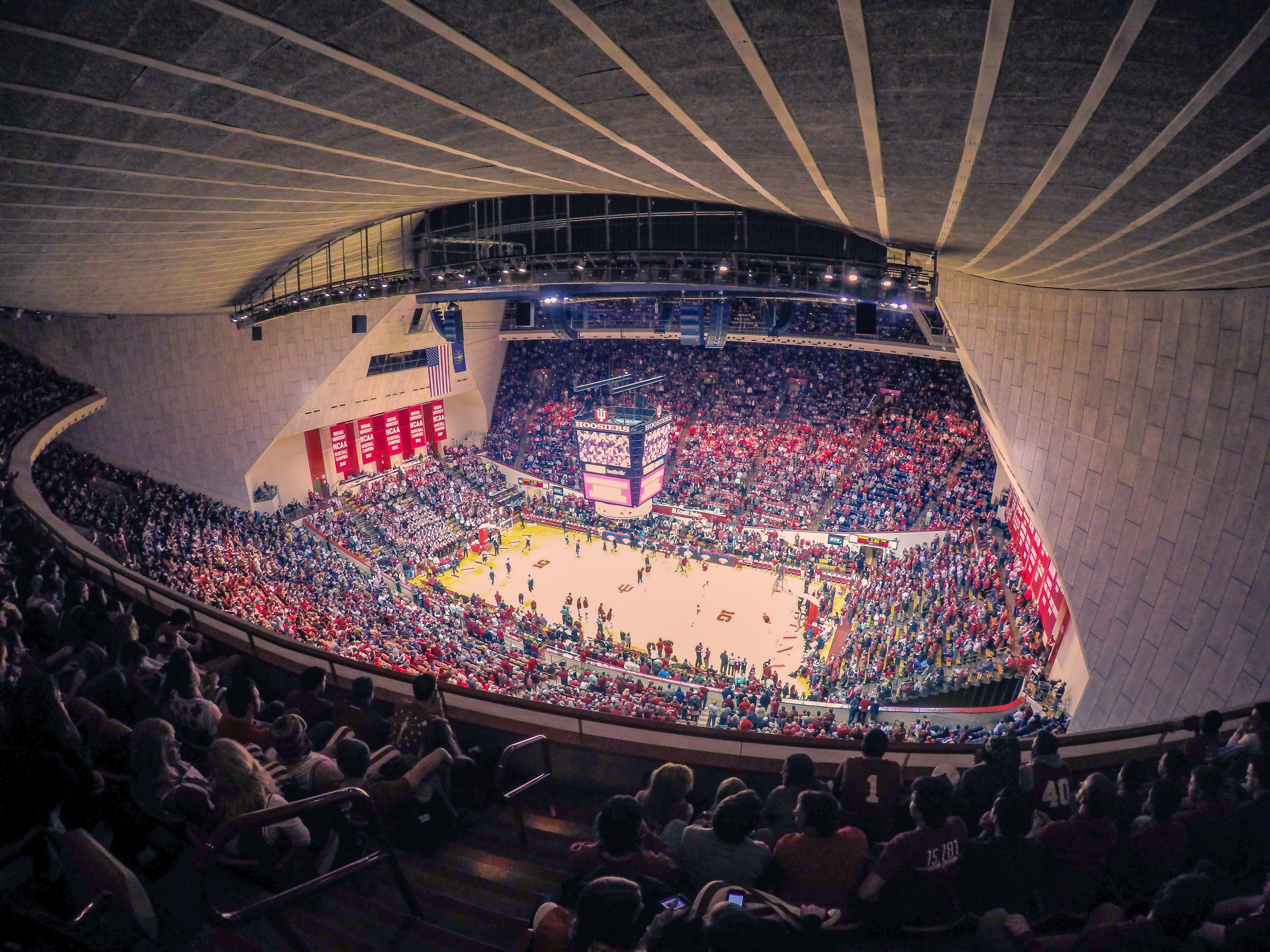
- Downtown Bloomington Indiana University Buskirk-Chumley Theater Eskenazi Museum of Art Assembly Hall

- Flag Seal Logo
- Interactive map of Bloomington, Indiana
- Location within Indiana Location within the United States
- Coordinates: 39°10′00″N 86°32′05″W
- Country: United States
- State: Indiana
- County: Monroe
- Townships: Bloomington, Perry, Richland, Van Buren
- Founded: 1818
- Incorporated: 1827

Government
  - Type: Mayor–council government
  - Mayor: Kerry Thomson (D)

Area
  - City: 23.43 sq mi (60.69 km^{2})
  - Land: 23.25 sq mi (60.22 km^{2})
  - Water: 0.19 sq mi (0.48 km^{2})
- Elevation: 804 ft (245 m)

Population (2020)
  - City: 79,168
  - Density: 3,405.1/sq mi (1,314.72/km^{2})
  - Metro: 175,506
- Time zone: UTC−5 (EST)
  - Summer (DST): UTC−4 (EDT)
- ZIP Codes: 47401–47408
- Area code: 812 & 930
- FIPS code: 18-05860
- GNIS ID: 2394196
- Website: www.bloomington.in.gov

Bloomington is a city in Monroe County, Indiana, United States, and its county seat. The population was 79,168 at the 2020 census. It is the seventh-most populous city in Indiana and the fourth-most populous outside the Indianapolis metropolitan area. It is the home of Indiana University Bloomington, the flagship campus of the Indiana University system. Established in 1820, IU Bloomington enrolls over 45,000 students.

The city was established in 1818 by a group of settlers from Kentucky, Tennessee, the Carolinas, and Virginia who were so impressed with "a haven of blooms" that they called it Bloomington. It is the principal city of the Bloomington metropolitan area in south-central Indiana, which had 161,039 residents in 2020. Bloomington has been designated a Tree City USA since 1984. The city was also the location of the Academy Award–winning 1979 movie Breaking Away, featuring a reenactment of Indiana University's annual Little 500 bicycle race.

== History ==
The area in which Bloomington is situated was previously inhabited by the Delaware, Potawatomi, Miami, and Eel River Miami peoples.

Bloomington was platted in 1818. A post office has been in operation at Bloomington since 1825. Bloomington was incorporated in 1827.

The current city logo was adopted on January 6, 1986, by the Bloomington Common Council. It was a combination of peony and trout lily, inspired by both quilt patterns used by regional folk artists in 19th century and the shape of Downtown Square.

The following locations and buildings are listed on the National Register of Historic Places:

- Elias Abel House
- Blair-Dunning House
- Bloomington City Hall
- Bloomington West Side Historic District
- Cantol Wax Company Building
- Coca-Cola Bottling Plant
- Cochran-Helton-Lindley House
- Courthouse Square Historic District
- Hinkle-Garton Farmstead
- Home Laundry Company
- Illinois Central Railroad Freight Depot
- Johnson's Creamery
- Legg House
- Millen House
- Millen-Chase-McCalla House
- Monroe Carnegie Library
- Monroe County Courthouse
- Morgan House, J.L. Nichols House and Studio
- North Washington Street Historic District
- The Old Crescent
- Princess Theatre
- Prospect Hill Historic District
- Second Baptist Church
- Seminary Square Park
- Steele Dunning Historic District
- University Courts Historic District
- Vinegar Hill Historic District
- Wicks Building
- Woolery Stone Company
- Andrew Wylie House

Many African Americans moved to Bloomington from Virginia, North Carolina, South Carolina, Ohio, Tennessee and Kentucky during the 1860s through the 1880s. Bloomington also attracted Scotch-Irish Presbyterians from South Carolina.

== Geography ==
According to the 2010 census, Bloomington has a total area of 23.359 square miles (60.50 km^{2}), of which 23.16 square miles (59.98 km^{2}) (or 99.15%) is land and 0.199 square miles (0.52 km^{2}) (or 0.85%) is water.

Bloomington is an area of irregular limestone terrain characterized by sinks, ravines, fissures, underground streams, sinking streams, springs and caves. It is in the rolling hills of south Central Indiana, resting on the intersection of the Norman Upland and the Mitchell Plain. The city's relatively varied topography is a sharp contrast to the flatter terrain more typical of central to northern portions of Indiana.

PCB pollution, associated with Westinghouse's operations, long was a concern in the area. A number of sites, in particular, Bennett's Dump and Lemon Lane Landfill at the northwestern edge of the city and Neal's Landfill in the county, were listed as Superfund sites. Clean-up operations at the Bennett Quarry site, started in 1983, were largely completed by 2000, while cleanups at the other sites were completed in 2012.

=== Water ===
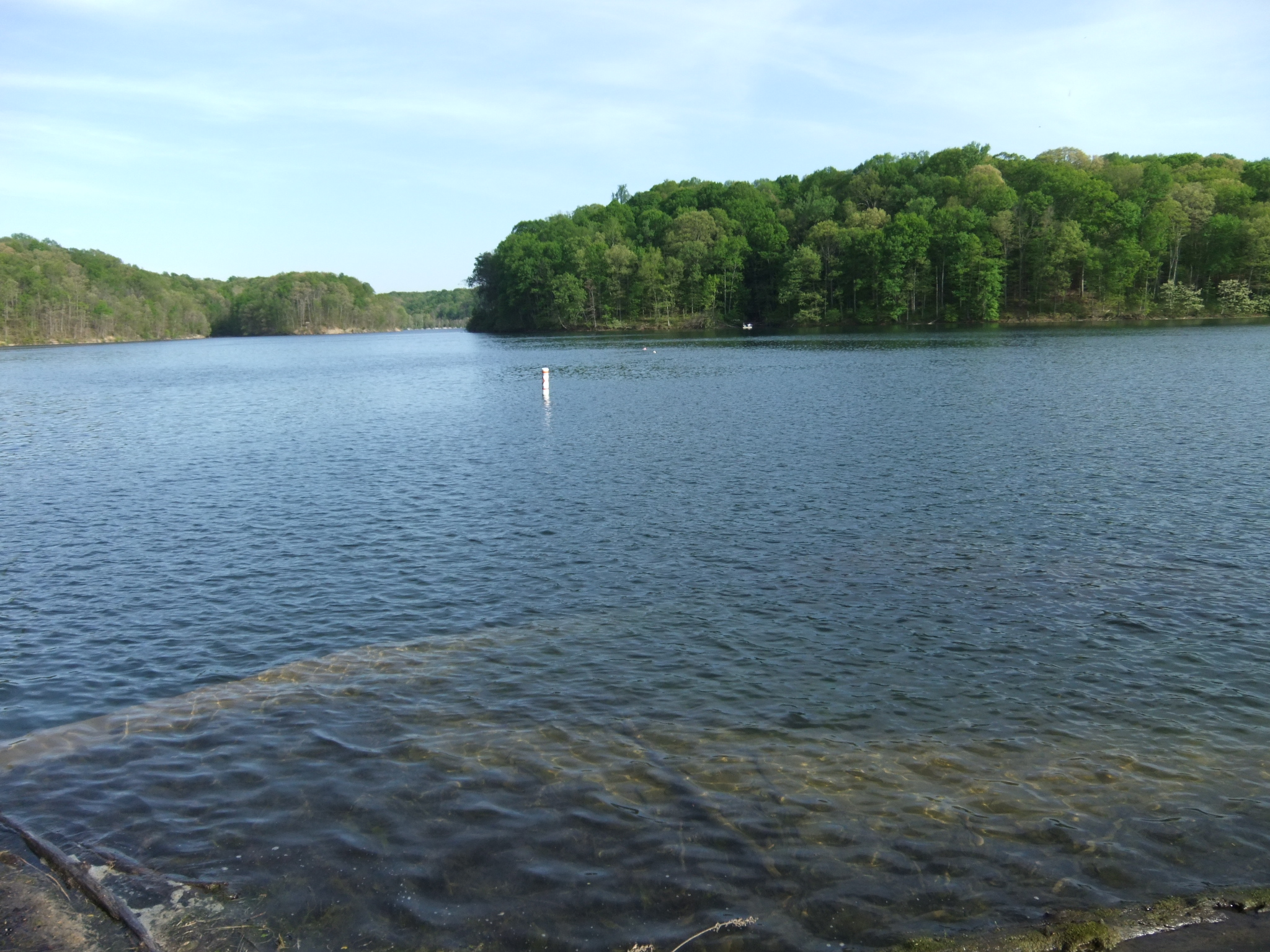
Griffy Lake, once the central source of drinking water for the city

Bloomington is on comparatively high ground, the summit of the divide between the basins of the West Fork and East Fork of Indiana's White River. Accordingly, there are no major watercourses within the city, nor is much groundwater available for wells. The largest stream within the city is Clear Creek, with its eastern branch known on the Indiana University campus as the Campus River, formerly the Jordan River.

Because natural lakes or rivers or groundwater are absent from the city and its environs, a number of dams have been constructed on nearby creeks over the last 100 years to provide for the water needs of Bloomington and Monroe County. Early 20th-century damming projects occurred at locations southwest of the city, the most notable being the Leonard Springs Dam. Because of the limestone formations underlying the reservoirs and the dams, water kept seeping from the reservoirs through naturally developing underground channels. Despite all efforts, the city was never able to fully stop the leakage and had to resort to pumping leaking water back to the reservoir.

By the 1920s, a more radical solution was needed to deal with the water crisis. A new reservoir, known as Griffy Lake, was constructed in a more geologically suitable area north of the city. (It is now within Bloomington's official city limits.) Later, in the 1950s, two much larger reservoirs, Lake Lemon and Monroe Lake were created in the northeastern and southeastern parts of Monroe County. Monroe Lake was created by the US Army Corps of Engineers for flood control but has since been used to supply the city and the county with water. The water pumping station at Griffy Lake was mothballed until May 2020.

Presently, the city is supplied with drinking water from Monroe Lake, via the Monroe Water Treatment Plant on S. Shields Ridge Rd. Originally opened in 1967, it was expanded in 2014, and now is capable of producing 30 million gallons of water per day. The sewer water from the northern part of the city is treated at the Blucher Poole Wastewater Treatment Plant (constructed 1968) and discharged into the Bean Blossom Creek. The sewer water from the southern half of the city goes to Dillman Road Wastewater Treatment Plant (constructed 1982) and is then discharged into the Clear Creek.

=== Climate ===
Bloomington has a hot-summer humid continental climate (Köppen Dfa). South Central Indiana receives an abundance of rain, with a yearly average of nearly 50 inches.

Climate data for Bloomington, Indiana (Indiana University Bloomington) 1991–2020 normals, extremes 1895–present
Month	Jan	Feb	Mar	Apr	May	Jun	Jul	Aug	Sep	Oct	Nov	Dec	Year
Record high °F (°C)	78 (26)	76 (24)	86 (30)	91 (33)	97 (36)	104 (40)	110 (43)	104 (40)	103 (39)	96 (36)	84 (29)	74 (23)	110 (43)
Mean maximum °F (°C)	60.4 (15.8)	65.4 (18.6)	74.6 (23.7)	81.2 (27.3)	87.1 (30.6)	92.1 (33.4)	93.8 (34.3)	93.5 (34.2)	90.8 (32.7)	82.4 (28.0)	71.5 (21.9)	62.1 (16.7)	95.1 (35.1)
Mean daily maximum °F (°C)	37.0 (2.8)	41.8 (5.4)	52.4 (11.3)	64.4 (18.0)	73.8 (23.2)	81.9 (27.7)	85.1 (29.5)	84.5 (29.2)	78.5 (25.8)	66.3 (19.1)	52.7 (11.5)	41.2 (5.1)	63.3 (17.4)
Daily mean °F (°C)	28.8 (−1.8)	32.5 (0.3)	42.1 (5.6)	53.4 (11.9)	63.3 (17.4)	71.8 (22.1)	75.0 (23.9)	74.0 (23.3)	67.1 (19.5)	55.3 (12.9)	43.4 (6.3)	33.5 (0.8)	53.3 (11.8)
Mean daily minimum °F (°C)	20.6 (−6.3)	23.3 (−4.8)	31.7 (−0.2)	42.3 (5.7)	52.7 (11.5)	61.7 (16.5)	64.9 (18.3)	63.5 (17.5)	55.8 (13.2)	44.4 (6.9)	34.1 (1.2)	25.8 (−3.4)	43.4 (6.3)
Mean minimum °F (°C)	0.4 (−17.6)	5.0 (−15.0)	15.0 (−9.4)	28.1 (−2.2)	38.1 (3.4)	49.4 (9.7)	55.5 (13.1)	54.4 (12.4)	42.6 (5.9)	31.9 (−0.1)	20.3 (−6.5)	8.3 (−13.2)	−2.5 (−19.2)
Record low °F (°C)	−21 (−29)	−20 (−29)	−2 (−19)	17 (−8)	21 (−6)	36 (2)	46 (8)	41 (5)	26 (−3)	17 (−8)	−2 (−19)	−20 (−29)	−21 (−29)
Average precipitation inches (mm)	3.78 (96)	2.95 (75)	3.66 (93)	5.21 (132)	5.36 (136)	5.41 (137)	4.58 (116)	3.38 (86)	3.81 (97)	3.82 (97)	3.93 (100)	3.49 (89)	49.38 (1,254)
Average snowfall inches (cm)	7.1 (18)	4.2 (11)	1.3 (3.3)	0.1 (0.25)	0.0 (0.0)	0.0 (0.0)	0.0 (0.0)	0.0 (0.0)	0.0 (0.0)	0.1 (0.25)	0.2 (0.51)	4.5 (11)	17.5 (44)
Average precipitation days (≥ 0.01 in)	11.6	9.6	10.7	12.4	13.2	11.2	9.8	7.8	7.5	8.8	9.3	11.2	123.1
Average snowy days (≥ 0.1 in)	4.7	3.4	1.0	0.1	0.0	0.0	0.0	0.0	0.0	0.1	0.3	2.7	12.3
Source: NOAA

== Demographics ==
Historical population
Census	Pop.	Note	%±
1850	1,305		—
1860	2,419		85.4%
1870	1,032		−57.3%
1880	2,756		167.1%
1890	4,018		45.8%
1900	6,460		60.8%
1910	8,838		36.8%
1920	11,595		31.2%
1930	18,227		57.2%
1940	20,870		14.5%
1950	28,163		34.9%
1960	31,357		11.3%
1970	43,262		38.0%
1980	52,044		20.3%
1990	60,633		16.5%
2000	69,291		14.3%
2010	80,405		16.0%
2020	79,168		−1.5%
2025 (est.)	83,307		5.2%
Source: US Census Bureau

=== Metropolitan area ===
Bloomington is the principal city of the Bloomington metropolitan area, Indiana, a metropolitan statistical area that covers Greene, Monroe, and Owen counties and had a combined population of 160,874 according to the 2023 American Community Survey.

=== Racial and ethnic composition ===
Bloomington city, Indiana – racial and ethnic composition Note: the US Census treats Hispanic/Latino as an ethnic category. This table excludes Latinos from the racial categories and assigns them to a separate category. Hispanics/Latinos may be of any race.
Race / ethnicity (NH = Non-Hispanic)	Pop 2000	Pop 2010	Pop 2020	% 2000	% 2010	% 2020
White alone (NH)	59,398	65,189	59,082	85.72%	81.08%	74.63%
Black or African American alone (NH)	2,897	3,562	4,005	4.18%	4.43%	5.06%
Native American or Alaska Native alone (NH)	182	176	126	0.26%	0.22%	0.16%
Asian alone (NH)	3,634	6,378	7,110	5.24%	7.93%	8.98%
Native Hawaiian or Pacific Islander alone (NH)	39	37	23	0.06%	0.05%	0.03%
Other race alone (NH)	180	158	334	0.26%	0.20%	0.42%
Mixed-race or multiracial (NH)	1,239	2,082	3,918	1.79%	2.59%	4.95%
Hispanic or Latino (any race)	1,722	2,823	4,570	2.49%	3.51%	5.77%
Total	69,291	80,405	79,168	100.00%	100.00%	100.00%

=== 2020 census ===
As of the 2020 census, Bloomington had a population of 79,168. The median age was 25.1 years. 13.0% of residents were under the age of 18 and 11.1% of residents were 65 years of age or older. For every 100 females there were 100.7 males, and for every 100 females age 18 and over there were 99.3 males age 18 and over.

This count, a 1.5% decrease from 2010, has been called into question since the timing of the count corresponded with the COVID-19 pandemic lockdown period when many Indiana University students had left the city to complete the Spring 2020 academic semester with their families at home.

99.9% of residents lived in urban areas, while 0.1% lived in rural areas.

There were 33,204 households in Bloomington, of which 16.9% had children under the age of 18 living in them. Of all households, 24.6% were married-couple households, 32.8% were households with a male householder and no spouse or partner present, and 35.1% were households with a female householder and no spouse or partner present. About 42.1% of all households were made up of individuals and 9.5% had someone living alone who was 65 years of age or older.

There were 36,454 housing units, of which 8.9% were vacant. The homeowner vacancy rate was 1.2% and the rental vacancy rate was 5.9%.

Racial composition as of the 2020 census
Race	Number	Percent
White	60,573	76.5%
Black or African American	4,089	5.2%
American Indian and Alaska Native	210	0.3%
Asian	7,134	9.0%
Native Hawaiian and Other Pacific Islander	29	0.0%
Some other race	1,606	2.0%
Two or more races	5,527	7.0%

=== American Community Survey ===
According to the 2023 American Community Survey estimates, the racial and ethnic makeup of the city was 77.8% White alone, 4.8% Black alone, 0.2% American Indian and Alaska Native alone, 10.5% Asian alone, 5.3% two or more races, and 5.6% Hispanic or Latino.

=== 2010 census ===
As of the 2010 census, there were 80,405 people, 31,425 households, and 11,267 families residing in the city. The population density was 3,471.7 inhabitants per square mile (1,340.4/km^{2}). There were 33,239 housing units at an average density of 1,435.2 per square mile (554.1/km^{2}). The racial makeup of the city was 83.0% White, 4.6% African American, 0.3% Native American, 8.0% Asian, 0.1% Pacific Islander, 1.2% from other races, and 3.0% from two or more races. Hispanic or Latino residents of any race were 3.5% of the population.

There were 31,425 households, of which 16.6% had children under the age of 18 living with them, 25.3% were married couples living together, 7.5% had a female householder with no husband present, 3.1% had a male householder with no wife present, and 64.1% were non-families. 38.2% of all households were made up of individuals, and 7.5% had someone living alone who was 65 years of age or older. The average household size was 2.09 and the average family size was 2.76.

The median age in the city was 23.3 years. 11.4% of residents were under the age of 18; 44.5% were between the ages of 18 and 24; 23% were from 25 to 44; 13.3% were from 45 to 64; and 7.9% were 65 years of age or older. The gender makeup of the city was 50.3% male and 49.7% female.

=== 2000 census ===
As of the census of 2000, there were 69,291 people, 26,468 households, and 10,454 families residing in the city. The population density was 3,511.1 inhabitants per square mile (1,355.6/km^{2}). There were 28,400 housing units at an average density of 1,439.1 per square mile (555.6/km^{2}). The racial makeup of the city was 87.03% White, 4.24% African American, 0.29% Native American, 5.26% Asian, 0.07% Pacific Islander, 1.10% from other races, and 2.01% from two or more races. Hispanic or Latino residents of any race were 2.49% of the population. 22.9% were of German, 10.2% Irish, 9.1% English and 8.4% American ancestry according to Census 2000. 89.3% spoke only English at home, while 2.9% spoke Spanish, 1.3% Korean, 1.1% German and 1.0% Chinese or Mandarin.

There were 26,468 households, out of which 17.9% had children under the age of 18 living with them, 29.2% were married couples living together, 7.8% had a female householder with no husband present, and 60.5% were non-families. 39.1% of all households were made up of individuals, and 7.1% had someone living alone who was 65 years of age or older. The average household size was 2.09 and the average family size was 2.76.

In the city, 12.7% of the population was under the age of 18, 42.3% was from 18 to 24, 24.6% from 25 to 44, 12.6% from 45 to 64, and 7.9% was 65 years of age or older. The median age was 23 years. For every 100 females, there were 94.4 males. For every 100 females age 18 and over, there were 92.8 males.

The median income for a household in the city was $25,377, and the median income for a family was $50,054. Males had a median income of $32,470 compared to $26,100 for females. The per capita income for the city was $16,481. About 10.3% of families and 29.6% of the population were below the poverty line, including 17.3% of those under age 18 and 7.6% of those age 65 or over.

== Economy ==
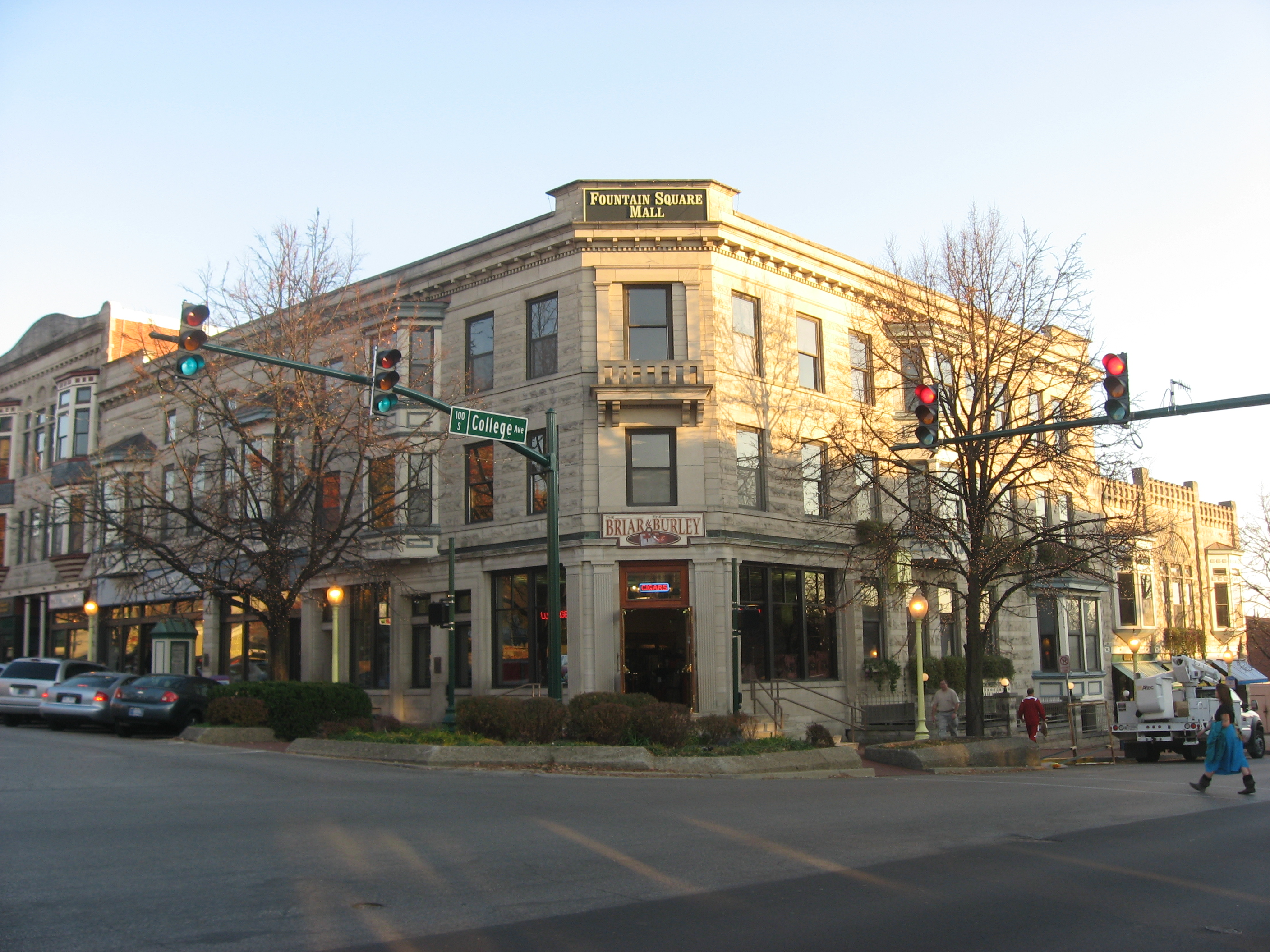
Intersection of Kirkwood and College, Courthouse Square Historic District

The Bloomington and Monroe County region is home to major employers representing a diverse collection of fields, including education, the life sciences, advanced manufacturing and technology. The Bloomington Economic Development Corporation (BEDC) is dedicated to fostering economic growth and development in Monroe County. BEDC works to attract, retain, and support businesses and residents.

Bloomington is a regional economic center anchored by Indiana University and home to a diverse business community involved in pharmaceuticals, medical devices, advanced manufacturing, defense industry, technology, health care, and the arts. Bloomington's concentration of employment in the life sciences is six times greater than the U.S. average, and employment in the technology sector has grown by over 80 percent in recent years. Companies based in Bloomington include Cook Group, Author Solutions, OneWorld Enterprises, BloomingFoods, Bloomington Tutors, and Singota Solutions.

Otis Elevator Company had a production plant in Bloomington from 1965 to 2012. The site at 1425 South Curry Pike was acquired by plastics lid and cap maker Phoenix's Enclosures in 2017. Other historic factories include an RCA plant which made color TVs (later as Thomson Consumer Electronics and Cook Pharmaica), a General Electric refrigerator plant (vacant but acquired by Cook Group), and the Showers Brothers furniture factory (partially occupied by Indiana University and as Bloomington City Hall).

== Education ==
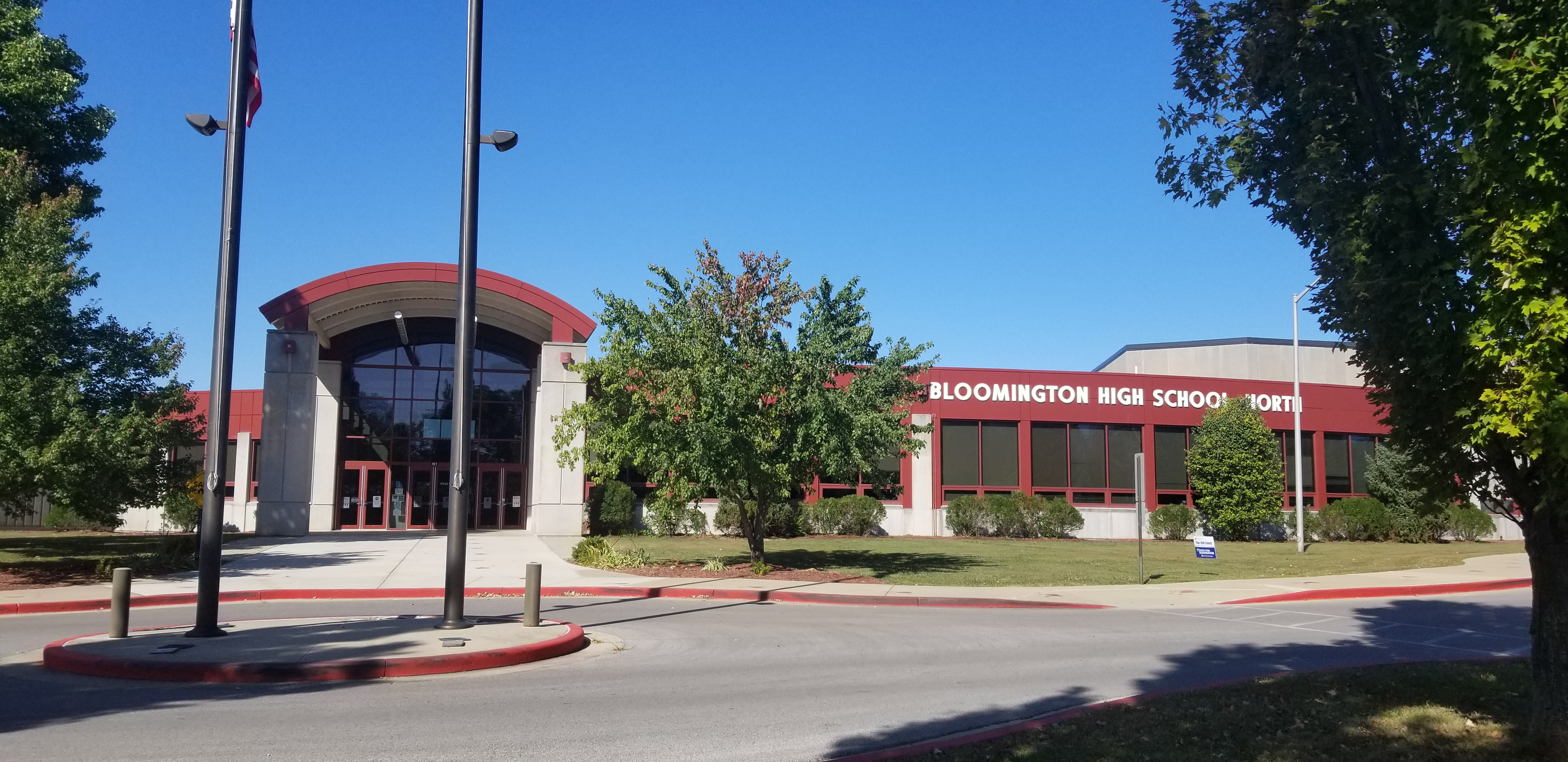
Bloomington High School North

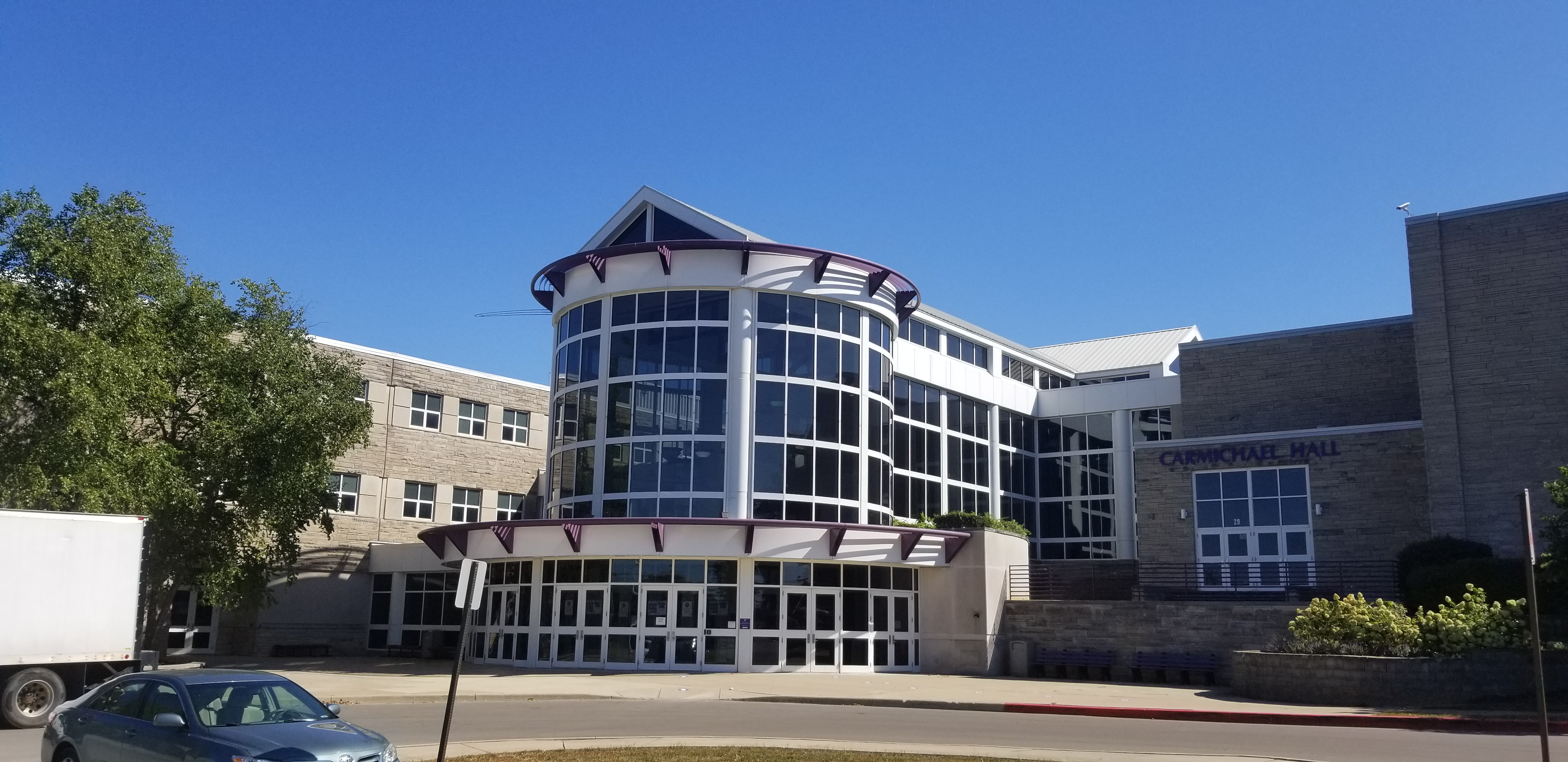
Bloomington High School South

=== Primary and secondary ===
Bloomington is served by the public Monroe County Community School Corporation, which includes 14 elementary schools, three middle schools, Bloomington High School North, Bloomington High School South, Bloomington Graduation School, and Bloomington Academy.

Private high schools include Harmony School, Lighthouse Christian Academy, and Seven Oaks Classical School.

=== Higher education ===
Indiana University Bloomington is the flagship campus of Indiana University, with over 40,000 students. It is classified among "R1: Doctoral Universities – Very high research activity".

Bloomington is also home to a campus of Ivy Tech Community College of Indiana, the state's public community college system.

=== Library ===
Bloomington has two public library locations, the downtown library and the southwest branch. Both are branches of the Monroe County Public Library.

== Media ==
=== Newspapers ===
- The Herald-Times
- Indiana Daily Student

=== Magazines ===
- Bloom Magazine

=== Television ===
- WTIU is a PBS station owned by Indiana University along with its sister radio station WFIU, an NPR station.
- WTTV is licensed to Bloomington but is based out of Indianapolis as well as its sister station WXIN, which are both owned by Nexstar Media Group.

Bloomington also receives stations from Indianapolis and is part of the Indianapolis market.

A five-channel public-access television station is housed in the Monroe County Public Library. The station, known as Community Access Television Services or CATS, was established in 1973 and serves as a "dedicated constitutional forum". In April 1995, Rox, a program produced at CATS (then Bloomington Community Access Television, or BCAT), became the first TV series distributed via the web, with an episode titled "Global Village Idiots".

=== Radio stations ===
- W203BL 88.9 FM. Owned by and broadcasts Air 1 Radio Network, which is a Christian music radio station.
- W241CD 96.1 FM also called Rock 96.1 The Quarry is a rock radio station that plays programming from Westwood One including "96 Rock" WFTK Cincinnati based morning hosts JD & Bridget. It is a sister station to WGCL and WTTS, which are also owned by Sarkes Tarzian, Inc. Tarzian was a prominent figure in town.
- WBWB 96.7 FM, also called B97, is a Top 40 radio station and it is a sister station to WHCC.
- WCLS 97.7 FM is the local classic rock music station.
- WCYI 104.1 FM is an ultra low powered religious FM radio station broadcast out of St. Charles Borromeo Catholic Church.
- WFHB 91.3 and 98.1 in Bloomington, 100.7 in Nashville and 106.3 in Ellettsville. It is the Local community radio station.
- WFIU 103.7 FM, The NPR station in town. Owned by Indiana University.
- WGCL WGCL AM 1370 and 98.7 FM. WGCL is the local news talk radio station and is a sister station to WTTS and Rock 96.1 The Quarry.
- WHCC 105.1 FM, also called Hoosier Country 105, is a local country station which is also one of the flagship stations of Indiana Hoosiers Sports Network along with The Fan 1070 AM. Sister station to WBWB.
- WIUX 99.1 FM, The local student radio station of Indiana University. It is a low powered station.
- WMYJ 88.9 FM, also called MyJoy Radio, is a Southern Gospel radio station that is licensed to Oolitic, Indiana, and serves the Bloomington, Indiana area.
- WOMB 89.9 FM, also called With Our Mother Blessed, is a Christian radio station licensed to Ellettsville, Indiana.
- WTTS 92.3 FM is technically licensed to Trafalgar, Indiana. It transmits to Bloomington and Indianapolis. It is an Adult Album Alternative station. Sister station to WGCL and Rock 96.1 The Quarry Owned by Sarkes Tarzian, Inc.
- WVNI 95.1 and 107.7 FM is also called spirit 95, which is a Christian contemporary music station broadcasting from Nashville, Indiana.

== Transportation ==
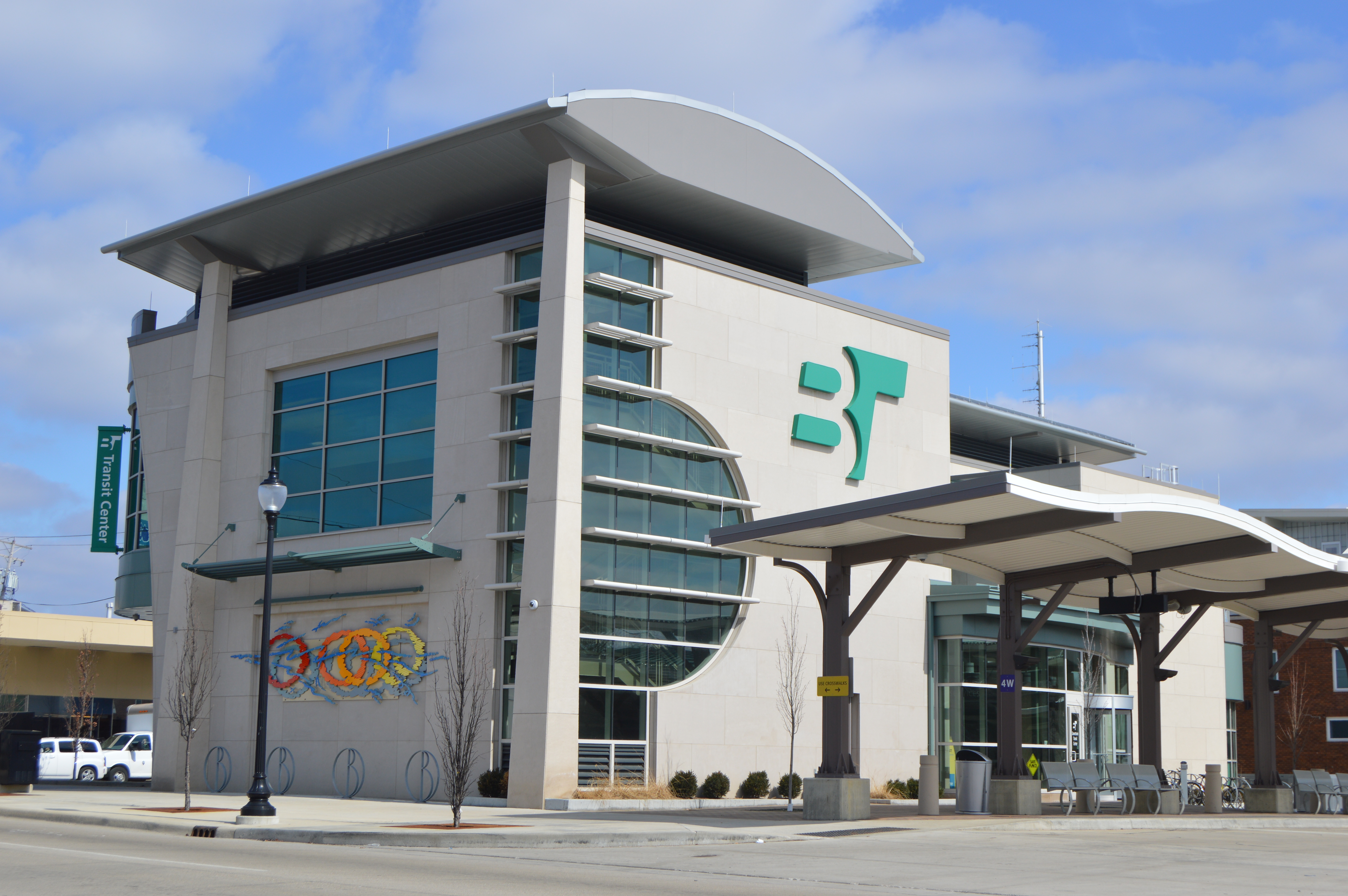
Bloomington Transit Center

=== Airports ===
- Monroe County Airport (no scheduled commercial flights)
- Indianapolis International Airport (nearest commercial airport, 50 miles (80 km) away)

=== Bicycling ===
Bloomington is a gold-rated bicycle-friendly community by the League of American Bicyclists. There are several significant bike trails in and around the city, most notably the B-Line Trail, which runs north to south for almost four miles through downtown Bloomington and Switchyard Park. The B-Line leads into the Bloomington Rail Trail to the south, which in turn branches into the Clear Creek Trail and the Limestone Greenway. A branching east to west trail running along 7th street, dubbed the 7-Line, was constructed in 2021.

Bloomington and Indiana University briefly ran a dockless bikeshare program called Pace, which launched in June 2018. The program was cancelled after less than a year.

=== Highways ===
- I-69
- SR 37
- SR 45
- SR 46
- SR 48
- SR 446

For many years, Bloomington was one of the largest cities without an interstate or freeway. However, the city gained interstate access in December 2015 when the Interstate 69 expansion between Evansville and Indianapolis reached Bloomington.

State Road 37 used to serve as the main highway through Bloomington, running as a four-lane expressway on the west side of the city. However, since the statewide completion of I-69 in August 2024, SR 37 ends on the south side of Bloomington at an interchange with the interstate.

State Road 45 (SR 45) and State Road 46 (SR 46) run through Bloomington together on a four-lane highway known as the "bypass."

State Road 48 (SR 48) starts as a four-lane highway on the city's west side before narrowing to two-lanes at Oard Rd outside the city limits.

State Road 446 (SR 446) runs as a minor state highway from Bloomington's east side through Lake Monroe and the Hoosier National Forest.

=== Public transportation ===
Local bus service is provided by Bloomington Transit.

Bus service to Indianapolis is provided by Miller Transportation bus lines.

=== Railroads ===
Bloomington is served by freight service only Indiana Rail Road.

== Notable people ==
Note: This list does not include students attending Indiana University except for locals. Please see List of Indiana University (Bloomington) people for famous alumni.

- Brett Anderson, lead vocalist of rock band The Donnas
- David Anspaugh, director of Hoosiers and Rudy
- Kenny Aronoff, drummer
- Jason Ayers, WWE referee
- David Baker, symphonic jazz composer
- Dee Bradley Baker, voice actor
- Tony Baldwin, college softball coach
- Arija Bareikis, actress
- Paul Baribeau, folk punk singer and musician
- Joshua Bell, violinist
- Abraham Benrubi, actor
- Kent Benson, basketball player
- Diane Bish, organist, concert and recording artist, composer and conductor
- Joseph O. Butcher, major general in the Marine Corps
- Meg Cabot, author
- Hoagy Carmichael, singer-songwriter
- Calbert Cheaney, basketball player, assistant coach for the College Park Skyhawks
- Chris Clavin, singer-songwriter, Plan-It-X Records owner
- Terri Conn, actress
- William Cook, founder of Cook Inc.
- John Merle Coulter, former president of Indiana University
- James Counsilman, US Olympic swimming coach
- Althea Crome, micro-knitter
- Malcolm Dalglish, hammered dulcimer player, composer, and choral director
- Grey Damon, actor
- John Darnielle, singer-songwriter
- Krista Detor, musician
- Joe Dowell, singer-songwriter
- Wilson V. Eagleson II, U.S. Army Air Force officer, decorated Tuskegee Airmen fighter pilot; raised in Bloomington; son of IU's first African American woman graduate
- Andy Fillmore, Canadian member of Parliament for Halifax, Nova Scotia
- Mick Foley, former professional wrestler and author
- Karen Joy Fowler, author
- Rex Grossman, former NFL quarterback
- David F. Hamilton, judge on the United States Court of Appeals for the Seventh Circuit
- Bobby Helms, singer, "Jingle Bell Rock", "My Special Angel", "Fraulein"
- Douglas Hofstadter, cognitive scientist
- Jordan Hulls, basketball player
- Elaine Irwin Mellencamp, model
- Jared Jeffries, basketball player, retired
- David Starr Jordan, former president of Indiana University and Stanford University
- Kraig Kinser, ARCA driver
- Sheldon Kinser, Indy car driver
- Steve Kinser, race car driver
- Alfred Kinsey, founder of Kinsey Institute for Research in Sex, Gender and Reproduction
- Amelia Laskey, ornithologist
- Brad Leftwich, musician
- Lil Bub, famous cat, internet sensation
- Ross Lockridge Jr., novelist, author of Raintree County
- Austin Lucas, singer-songwriter
- Sara Lund, musician
- Cory Martin, shot putter
- Sean May, former NBA basketball player
- John Mellencamp, musician
- Maurice Mierau, writer
- Denny Miller, actor
- Carrie Newcomer, musician
- Thubten Jigme Norbu, brother of Tenzin Gyatso, 14th Dalai Lama
- Shohaku Okumura, Zen Buddhist author and teacher
- Elinor Ostrom, Nobel Prize–winner, political scientist
- Jeff Overton, PGA Tour golfer
- Angelo Pizzo, screenwriter and producer of Hoosiers and Rudy
- Kevin Pritchard, NBA front office executive
- Scott Rolen, former Major League Baseball player
- David Lee Roth, lead singer of band Van Halen
- Alfred Ryors, former president of Indiana University
- Jeff Sagarin, statistician for sports, contributor to USA Today
- Ronnie Schneider, ATP tennis player
- Frithjof Schuon, philosopher and mystic
- György Sebők, pianist
- János Starker, cellist
- John Strohm, singer, guitarist, and lawyer
- Sarkes Tarzian, engineer, inventor, and broadcaster
- Jill Bolte Taylor, neuroanatomist
- Herman B Wells, former president and chancellor of Indiana University
- Camilla Williams, opera singer
- Collett E. Woolman, founder of Delta Air Lines
- Andrew Wylie, first president of Indiana University
- Max Zorn, mathematician

== In popular culture ==
- The 1979 film Breaking Away is about four teens from Bloomington. It was filmed around the city.
- Karen Kingsbury's book series featuring the Baxter family (which comprises a large number of her works) is centered in Bloomington.
- In the 1988 film Ernest Saves Christmas, the now-former Santa Claus (who goes back to using his real name, Seth Applegate) informs the character Harmony Starr that he knows about her real identity, that being Pamela Trenton, and that she is originally from Hampton Avenue, Bloomington, Indiana.
- In the Star Trek universe, Captain Kathryn Janeway was born on May 20, 2336, in Bloomington, Indiana (as stated in the 2000 episode "Imperfection"). A monument to this was constructed in 2020.
- In the popular video game Overwatch, hero character Soldier: 76 is from Bloomington, Indiana.
- Patricia Highsmith used Bloomington as the model for the fictional town of Chalmerston in her 1983 novel People Who Knock on the Door
- The novel Stranger Things: Suspicious Minds centers on Terry Ives and her friends, and is set in Bloomington during the years 1969–1970.
- People from Bloomington by Budi Darma is a collection of short stories.

== Points of interest ==
- Constellation Stage and Screen – local professional theater and film series (merger of Bloomington Playwright's Project, Cardinal Stage, and Pigasus Institute)
- Downtown historic district
- Indiana University Bloomington
- Kinsey Institute for Research in Sex, Gender, and Reproduction (Bloomington)
- Lake Lemon – located approximately 10 miles northeast of Bloomington.
- Griffy Lake
- Captain Janeway Birthplace Statue – Bloomington is the birthplace of fictional Captain Kathryn Janeway, from the TV show Star Trek: Voyager.

== Sister cities ==
Bloomington has the following sister cities:

- Santa Clara, Villa Clara, Cuba
- Posoltega, Chinandega, Nicaragua

Since 2022, the city has also had a relationship via Sibling Cities USA with Palo Alto, California.

== See also ==
- List of public art in Bloomington, Indiana
