= Caldwell & Drake =

Indiana construction company

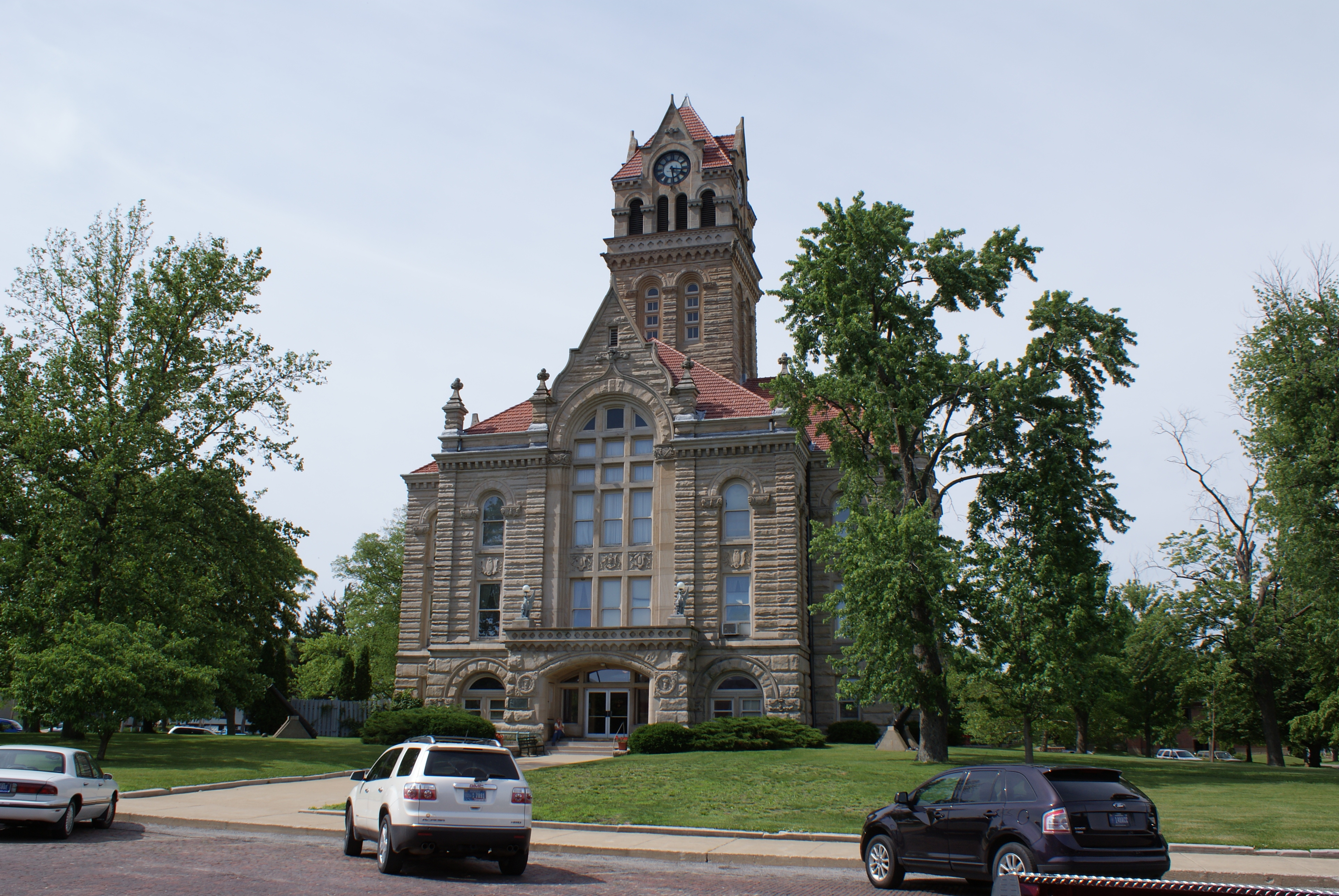
Starke County Courthouse built by Caldwell & Drake, designed by Wing & Mahurin

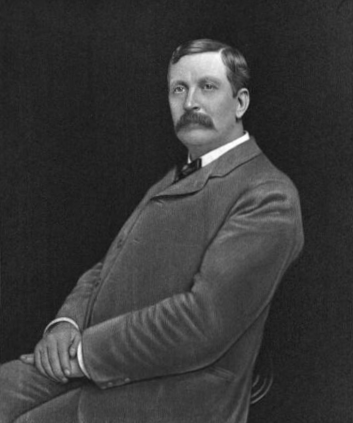
George W. Caldwell

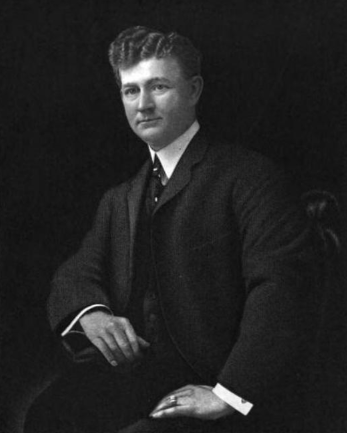
Lester Drake

Caldwell & Drake was a construction firm based in Indiana, USA. It included George W. Caldwell and Lester Drake.

A number of their works are listed on the U.S. National Register of Historic Places.

Works include:

- New Hope Bridge, Columbus Township, Bartholomew County, Indiana
- Hotel Sansone, 312 Park Central East Springfield, MO (Caldwell and Drake), NRHP-listed
- Jefferson County Armory, 525 W. Muhammad Ali Blvd. Louisville, KY (Caldwell & Drake), NRHP-listed
- Monroe County Courthouse, Courthouse Sq. Bloomington, IN (Caldwell, George & Drake, Lester), NRHP-listed
- Ottawa County Courthouse, W. 4th and Madison Sts. Port Clinton, OH (Caldwell & Drake), NRHP-listed
- Somerset County Courthouse, E. Union St. and N. Center Ave. Somerset, PA (Caldwell & Drake), NRHP-listed
- Starke County Courthouse, Courthouse Sq. Knox, IN (Caldwell & Drake), NRHP-listed
- Stewart Hall, West Virginia University campus Morgantown, WV (Caldwell & Drake), NRHP-listed
- West Baden Springs Hotel, West Baden Springs, IN
- Wood County Courthouse, Court Sq. at 3rd and Market St. Parkersburg, WV (Caldwell & Drake), NRHP-listed
