= List of public art in Bloomington, Indiana =

This is a list of public art in Bloomington, Indiana.

This list applies only to works of public art accessible in an outdoor public space. It does not include artwork visible inside a museum.

Most of the works mentioned are sculptures. When this is not the case (with a sound installation, for example), it is stated next to the title.

== Bloomington ==
Title	Artist	Year	Location/GPS coordinates	Material	Dimensions	Owner	Image
Alexander Memorial; Grand Army of the Republic Monument	Joseph Graf and Albert McIlveen	1928	Monroe County Courthouse39°10′0.64″N 86°32′2.07″W	Limestone	Overall: approx. H. 35 ft.; Sculpture: approx. 8 x 2 1/2 x 2 1/2 ft.	Monroe County Commissioners	
Axis	Dale Enochs	1985	Miller-Showers Park 39°10′47.04″N 86°32′3.89″W	Limestone	Sculpture: approx. 25 x 7 x 7 ft.	City of Bloomington	
Bloomington Waters	Brad Goldberg & Diana Goldberg	1995	Bloomington Parks & Recreation 39°10′10.95″N 86°32′10.61″W	Limestone	Approx. H. 12 ft. x W. 9 ft.	City of Bloomington	
Christ in Garden of Gethsemane	Georgia Marble Works	ca. 1955	Valhalla Memorial Gardens	Marble	Sculpture: approx. 47 x 72 x 20 in.	Valhalla Memorial Gardens	
Congregations for Peace	William T. Dahman and William Galloway	1978–1979	Monroe County Courthouse	Limestone	Sculpture: approx. 6 ft. x 43 in. x 43 in.	Monroe County Commissioners	
February	Jerald Jacquard	1988	McCalla School 39°10′16.62″N 86°31′38.18″W	Steel	approx. 8 ft. x 96 in. x 144 in.	Indiana University	
Foster Quadrangle Relief	Unknown		Ida Husted Harper Hall, John W. Foster Quadrangle	Limestone	Approx. 18 ft. x 6 ft. x 4 in.	Indiana University	
Garden of Prayer	Georgia Marble Works (Fabricator)	ca. 1965	Valhalla Memory Gardens	Marble	Sculpture: approx. 36 x 24 x 24 in.	Valhalla Memory Gardens	
The Goodbody Duck	Albert McIlveen		Goodbody Hall, Indiana University	Limestone	Approx. 18 x 12 x 12 in.	Indiana University	
Indiana Arc	Charles O. Perry	1955	Indiana University Art Museum	Aluminum			
Light of the World	Albert Molnar	1908	Monroe County Courthouse (south portico)	Limestone	12 x 9 x 4 ft		
Memorial Hall sculptures	Unknown	1925	Memorial Hall	Limestone	Indiana University seal relief: approx. 4 ft. x 18 in. x 6 in.; East and west reliefs: each approx. 16 x 12 x 6 in.; Doorway reliefs: each approx. 10 x 8 x 4 in.	Indiana University	
Monroe County Vietnam Veterans Memorial	Tony Grub	1991	Monroe County Courthouse	Limestone, metal	Sculpture: approx. 6 1/2 x 37 x 30 ft.	Monroe County Commissioners	
Peau Rouge Indiana	Alexander Calder	1970	Musical Arts Center, Indiana University 39°10′0″N 86°30′59″W	Steel	Sculpture: approx. 40 x 32 x 33 ft.	Indiana University	
Point/Counterpoint	Jerald Jacquard	1978	Corner of 6th & Madison 39°10′2.7″N 86°32′15.17″W	Steel	approx. 7 1/3 x 11 1/2 x 8 1/2 ft.		
Portico of Myers Hall	Unknown		Myers Hall	Limestone	Tripartite relief: approx. 5 ft. x 108 in. x 15 in.; Owls: approx. 24 x 16 x 11 in.; Faces in windows: approx. 15 x 10 x 15 in.	Indiana University	
Rabb Hall Relief Figures	Nathaniel Choate	1959	Rabb Hall, Indiana University	Limestone	Approx. 43 x 91 x 5 in.	Indiana University	
Showalter Fountain; The Birth of Venus	Robert Laurent	1961	Indiana University Auditorium	Bronze			
Wright Quadrangle Reliefs	Joseph Pollia	1949	Wright Quadrangle, Indiana University	Limestone	Justice and Art, each: approx. 6 ft. x 6 ft. x 5 in.; Sport reliefs, each: approx. 3 ft. x 45 ft. x 3 ft.; Drama: approx. 4 ft. x 4 ft. x 5 in.; Science: approx. 6 ft. x 6 ft. 2 in. x 5 in.	Indiana University	
