= Wood County Courthouse =

Wood County Courthouse may refer to:

- Wood County Courthouse (West Virginia), Parkersburg, West Virginia
- Wood County Courthouse and Jail, Bowling Green, Ohio
- Wood County Courthouse (Texas), Quitman, Texas, built by William M. Rice
- Wood County Courthouse (Wisconsin), Wisconsin Rapids, Wisconsin, listed on the National Register of Historic Places
