= Starke County Courthouse =

- U.S. National Register of Historic Places
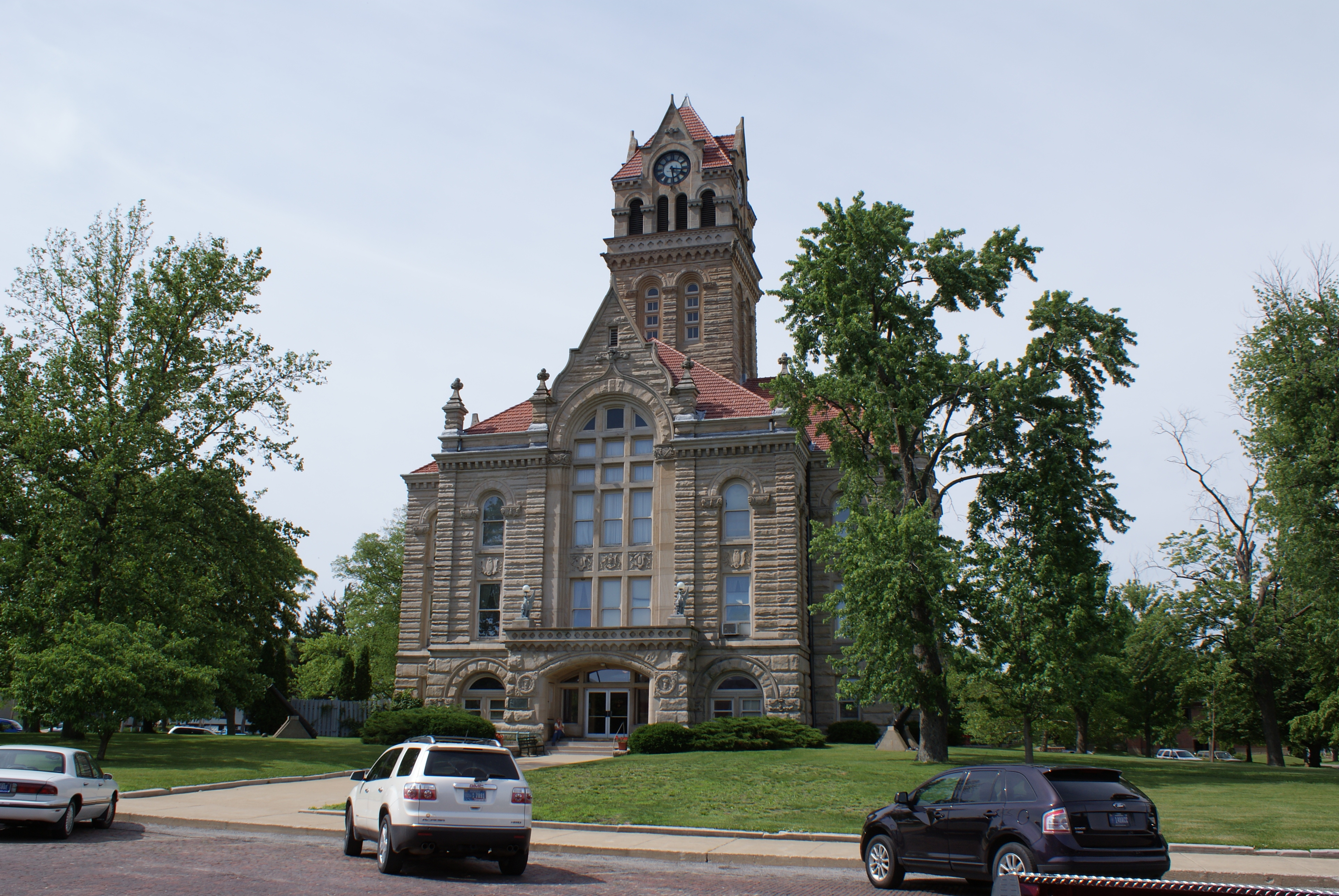
- Front of the Starke County Courthouse, located on Courthouse Square in downtown Knox, Indiana, United States.

- Location within Indiana Location within the United States
- Interactive map showing the location of Starke County Courthouse
- Location: Courthouse Sq., Knox, Indiana
- Coordinates: 41°17′56″N 86°37′21″W
- Area: 1.6 acres (0.65 ha)
- Built: 1897
- Built by: Caldwell & Drake
- Architect: Wing & Mahurin
- Architectural style: Romanesque, Richardsonian Romanesque
- NRHP reference No.: 86003170
- Added to NRHP: November 12, 1986

The Starke County Courthouse is a historic courthouse located at Knox, Indiana. It was designed by the architectural firm of Wing & Mahurin, of Fort Wayne and built in 1897. It is a three-story, Richardsonian Romanesque style Indiana Oolitic limestone and terra cotta building. It has a Greek cross-plan and is topped by a tiled hipped roof. It features a 138 feet tall clock tower located at the roof's center.

It was listed on the National Register of Historic Places in 1986.

== History ==
Starke County was organized on April 1, 1850. County business was conducted in the log home of Jacob Tillman, the county treasurer. In 1851 a new courthouse was built for $475. The frame structure was on the southeast corner of Mound and Pearl Streets. A second courthouse was completed in 1863. It had colonial columns and a bell tower. It was the first located on the public square. The final cost was $20,000. Construction of the present courthouse started in 1897. The courthouse is in the Richardsonian Romanesque style.

The building was constructed in 1897 by contractors George W. Caldwell and Lester Drake, of Columbus, Indiana. Caldwell and Drake are best known for the West Baden Springs Hotel, which, at that time, had the largest dome in the world, and for the Palace of Agriculture at the St. Louis World's Fair, which was the largest building ever constructed under one roof at the time of its execution. The building is a fine example of the Richardsonian Romanesque style. The Starke County Courthouse is significant for its Richardsonian Romanesque architecture, designed by the firm of John F. Wing and Marshall S. Mahurin, of Fort Wayne, and for its role as the seat of county government for the past 89 years.

The building is the third county courthouse and is significant for its being the seat of county government for nearly 90 years. A wooden structure was utilized when Knox became the county seat in 1850, being replaced with a larger, brick building in 1858. The present structure was finished in 1898 at a cost of $130,000, and is the oldest civic building in the county.

The building continues to serve the Starke County community. The courthouse presently contains the offices for zoning, health, the Council on Aging, the Court Clerk, the law library, the Jury room, probation, and Judges' Chambers, and the courtrooms.

The exterior of the building is almost identical to the Ottawa County Courthouse in Port Clinton, Ohio. After visiting Starke county, the Ottawa county commissioners decided to utilize the same architectural plans, and the building was constructed in 1901.

== Main Façade ==
The main façade is on the south. It has three bays with a central pavilion. The pavilion has a wall dormer. The main entrance is on the ground level and projects outward only for the first level. It is built of rock-faced stone blocks. The entryway has a balustrade balcony, on a corbel table, spanning a one-story entry with gargoyle light fixtures. Above the balcony is a two and one-half story round-arched window. Flanking the central pavilion are single bays, with a pair of windows topped by a round arch at the ground level. At the second floor and above the walls are of rock-faced stone, with alternating courses of wide and narrow stones.

Although the third floor double-hung windows are round-arched, their heads are Gothic-arched, with rock-faced voussoirs and ornate springers. Four pilasters are located on the facade, at each corner and flanking the central pavilion. The roofline has stone pinnacles above each pilaster.

== Clock Tower ==
From the center of the red, clay-tiled roof rises a square clock tower. It has two parts that are separated by a cornice and balustrade resembling the balcony over the main entrance. The lower section contains paired, deepset, compound, round-arched windows, divided horizontally into four lights. The springers are decorated. The cornice has gargoyle-like sculptures at each corner. The upper section has an arcade beneath, the clock. It is made of dressed, course ashlar and has a hipped roof.

== Interior ==
The courthouse interior has hardwood and ceramic-tiled floors, plaster and panel wall treatments, and ornate cornice and pilaster capitals. The staircase is accented by ornamental iron balusters, marble steps, and a patriotic ceiling painting of Liberty located between the first and second floors. Ionic capitals, with polychrome gilding, eagle, and shield are found on hall columns and pilasters.

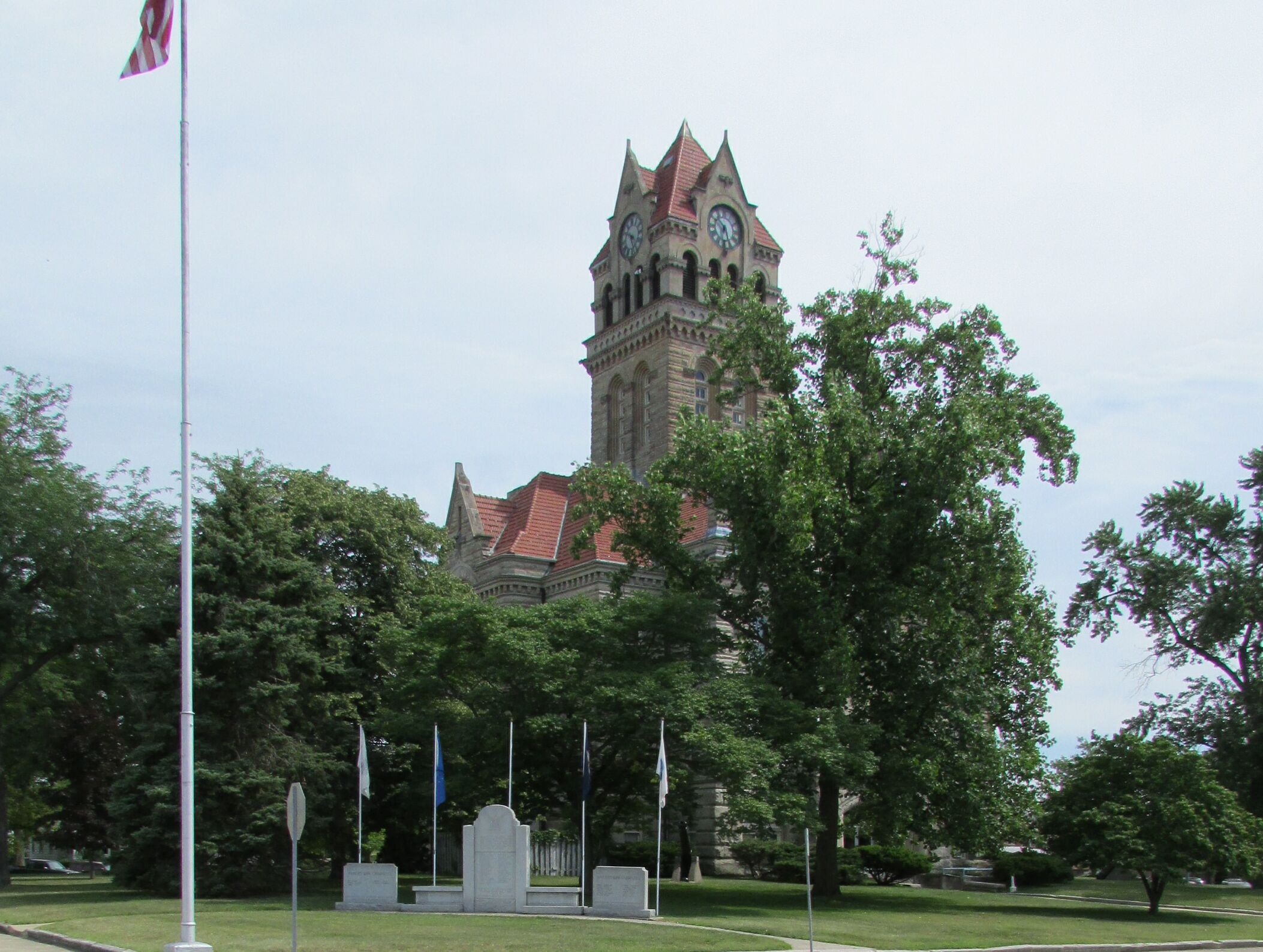
Starke County Veterans Memorial and the Starke County Courthouse, Knox, Indiana.

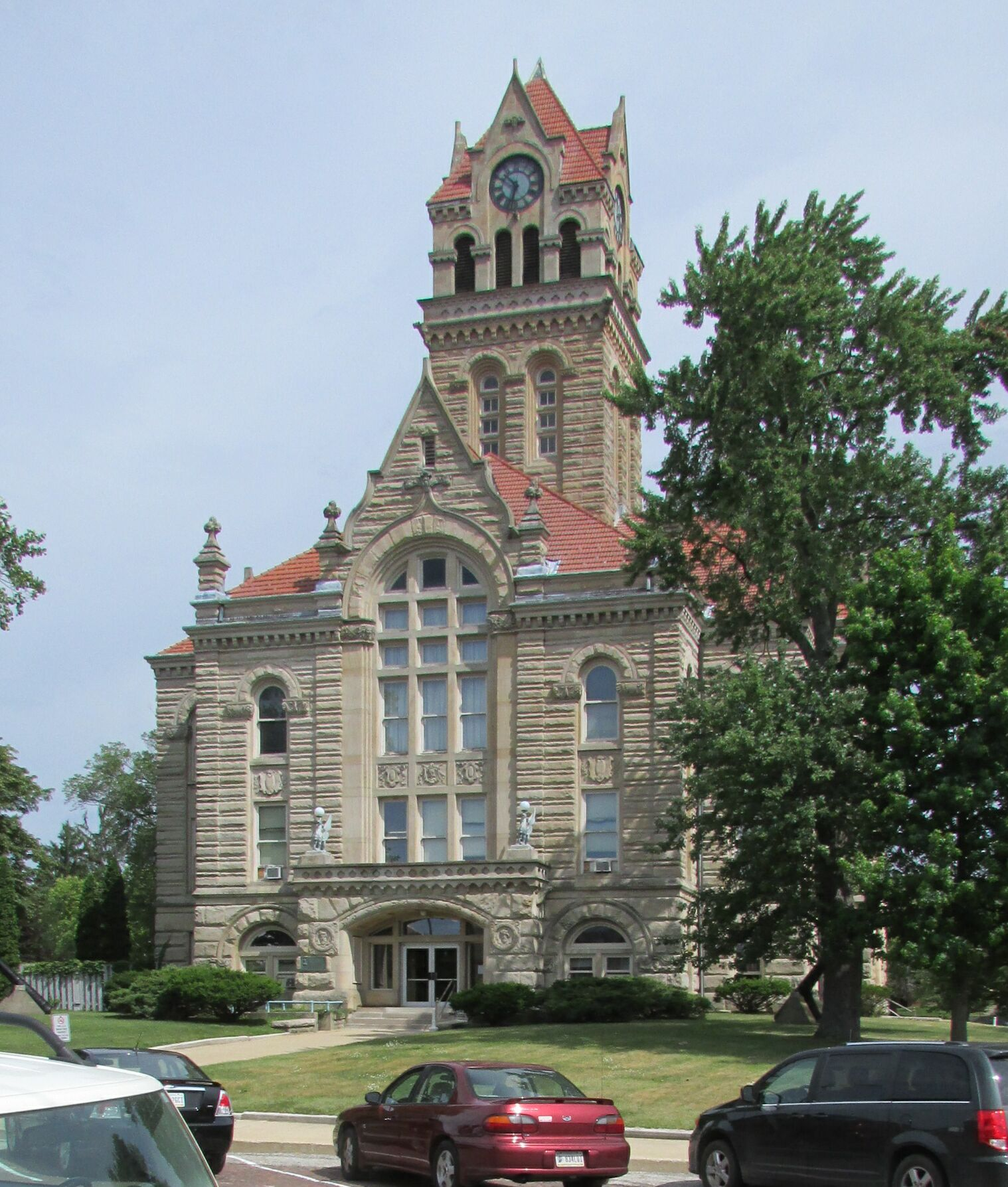
South Facade of the Starke County Courthouse, Knox, Indiana.

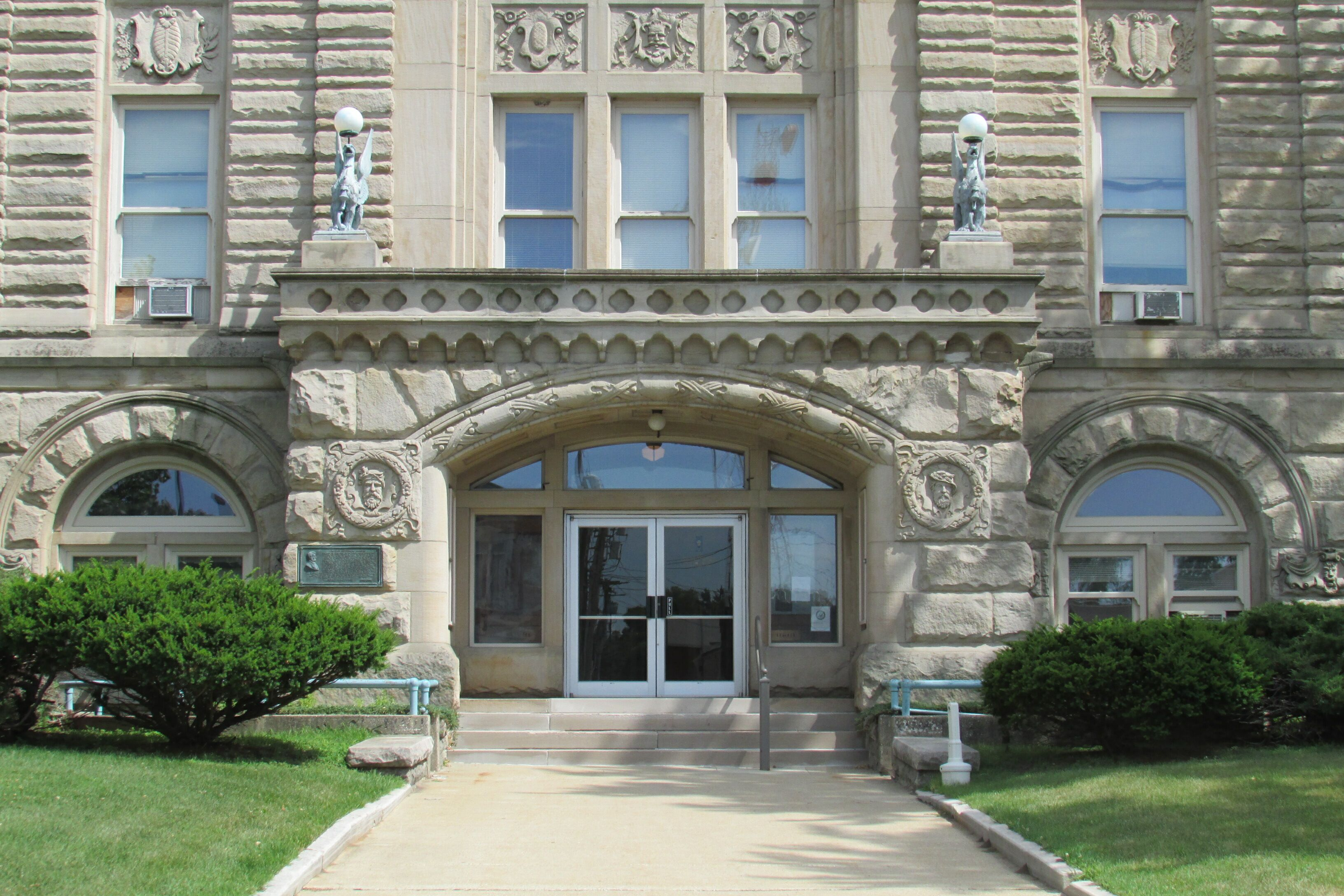
Main Entrance, Starke County Courthouse, Knox, Indiana.

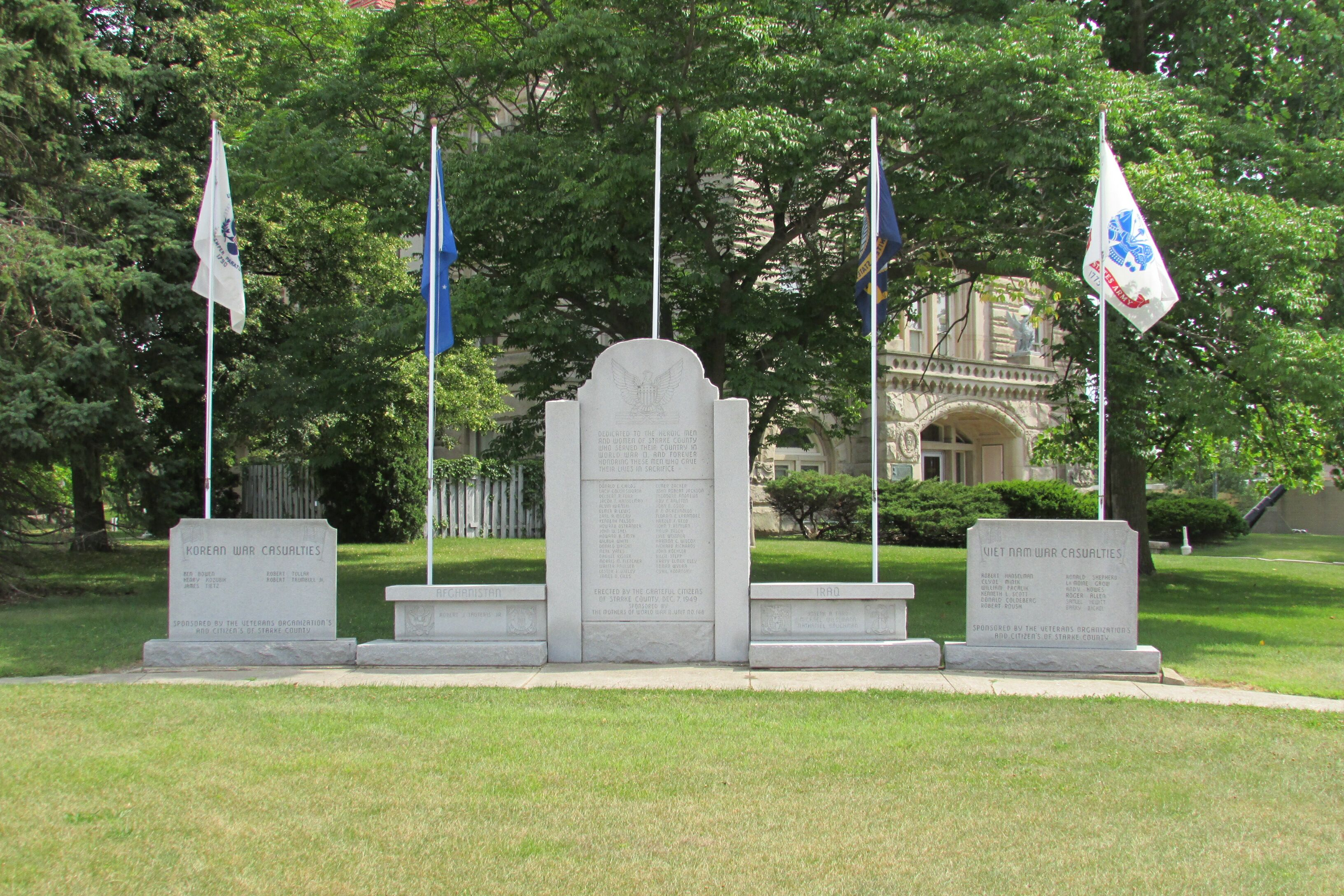
Starke County Veterans Memorial and the Starke County Courthouse, Knox, Indiana.

== Bibliography ==
- McCormick, Chester A. McCormick's Guide to Starke County. 1902.
- Richman, George J. History of Hancock County, Indiana. 1916. Greenfield, IN: Mitchell Publishing Company.
- Standard History of Starke County, Indiana, A. Vol. 1. Chicago: The Lewis Publishing Company, 1915.
- Starke County Centennial, 1850–1950. Published by the Starke County Democrat.
