= Rox (American TV series) =

American television program

- Created by: Joe Nickell and Bart Everson
- Starring: Joe Nickell "J" (bartender) and Bart Everson "B" (editor)
- Country of origin: United States
- No. of episodes: 100

Production
- Running time: varies

Original release
- Network: BCAT (Bloomington Community Access) (then Internet)
- Release: July 7, 1992 – present

Rox is an American independently produced television and subsequently web series, noted for its political activism as well as for its aesthetic and technical achievements. First shown on public-access cable TV in Bloomington, Indiana, the series expanded to multiple cable systems before becoming the first television series distributed on the internet in April 1995. Though an underground production with virtually no budget, the show has generated significant controversy and garnered major media coverage, as well as scholarly attention, especially during its earliest years.

== Background and original concept ==
In the fall of 1989, Bart Everson was arrested for public indecency (streaking) and assigned to community service at Community Access Television Services (then Bloomington Community Access Television) in Bloomington, Indiana. It was here that Everson learned how to produce videos for local cablecast, which a number of writers have suggested was key to the development of the series.

Rox premiered (under the title J&B on the ROX) on CATS on July 7, 1992. Originally conceived as a "mixed drink cooking show," the program had no budget and was produced under extremely primitive conditions in the basement of a rental property on the town's northeast side. However, the show quickly mutated in both style and substance as the producers moved to new housing and employed different production techniques.

== Production and distribution ==
Everson and bartender Joe Nickell produced three seasons of television from 1992 to 1995. Each season consisted of 26 (or more) weekly programs of approximately half an hour in length.

As the producers became more ambitious, the program expanded to public access cable stations in other cities through the laborious process of sending individual tapes through the mail.

In April 1995, ten years before the launch of YouTube, Rox began distributing via the web. The debut internet episode, "Global Village Idiots," was produced in segmented fashion and encoded as a series of short QuickTime videos for download from the show's website at rox.com. The program was hailed as the first television series on the internet and an example of "the real impact of the digital revolution in pop culture."

Everson and Nickell ceased production in 1995, citing financial difficulties, but distribution continued to expand. The producers signed several contracts with Free Speech TV, allowing for distribution via satellite on Dish Network. In the early days of Free Speech TV, this was "the network's most popular show."

Nickell moved to Montana; Everson relocated to New Orleans, but after an eight-year hiatus, they resumed production with their 87th episode.

== Subject matter and stylistic approach ==
Over the course of four seasons and almost a hundred episodes, Rox has covered a wide variety of topics, from the banal task of defrosting a freezer to broader social issues such as poverty and marijuana legalization. The program never uses scripts, employing a reality-based technique of capturing video on the fly, improvising performances, and assembling a narrative after the fact.

One early report described the show as "an offbeat look at art, life, culture, society, and whatever else the two hosts feel like looking at. The basic premise is that of teaching the viewers how to mix a variety of drinks."

However, over the long term, the true subject of the series has proven to be the lives of the producers and their community. This broad approach was reflected when the name of the show was shortened from J&B on the Rox to simply Rox. "We took J&B out of the name of the show because the show's not really about the two of us, it's about the community," Nickell said in an interview at the time. "We call it reality-based because it's based on people's lives."

Many have branded the show as a form of countercultural identity production, with various commentators labeling it as "a good depiction of the slacker lifestyle in Bloomington of the early '90s", "equal parts slacker diary, societal satire and improvisational theater", "a revealing slacker diary and satiric tour de farce of the Bohemian lifestyle," "transform[ing] the bleakest realities of everyday Bloomington, IN, life into 30 minutes of social satire and bohemian adventure."

The show's "early ’90s, grunge aesthetic" is reflected in the "blatantly amateur" camerawork, "grainy" video and "uneven sound."

Through it all, one constant theme has been the mixing and consumption of alcoholic beverages by Joe Nickell, the show's ostensible bartender. Though the program's early history coincided roughly with the beginning of the American craft cocktail renaissance, it can hardly be described as participating in that trend. Indeed, reporters have accused Nickell of perpetrating "the most disgusting cocktails ever conceived" on an unsuspecting populace.

== Cast and crew ==
Because of the shoestring nature of the production, the people behind the camera are usually the same people who are in front of it. No distinction is made between cast and crew.

Among the hundreds of people who have appeared on the show, the following have logged the most time.

- Joe Nickell, also known as J, who serves as the show's bartender.
- Bart Everson, also known as B, who serves as the show's editor.
- Terry Hornsby, a self-styled "anarchist clown" and chronically homeless individual, has produced recurring segments such as the "Anarchist Diary" and "Taiwan Rox."
- Christy Paxson has been cited by critics as "responsible for many of the program's most memorable moments" because of her "mastery of timing and character voices and her sense of the absurd."

== Notable guests ==
- Woody Burton
- Noam Chomsky
- Richard Cowan
- Helen Hill
- Austin Lucas
- David Ossman
- Varro Eugene Tyler

== Controversies ==
Since the beginning, Rox has courted controversy, initially through attempting to air allegedly obscene material and later through provocative, politically charged depictions of illegal activities.

=== First season ===
Conflicts between Rox producers and the Monroe County Public Library (which housed the CATS public access station) cropped up almost immediately, beginning with episode 5 and continuing with episodes 22 and 24.

Telecommunications scholar Lindsy Pack details these three early episodes in a study titled "Ambiguous Standards, Arbitrary Enforcement." The three episodes involved coprophagia, simulated masturbation, and a close-up shot of male genitalia; none were cablecast in their entirety, and were shown only in censored form.

Episode 5, "Rum & Coke Special," featured a segment titled "Coprophagia Corner," in which the hosts displayed a photo, downloaded from the internet, which "depicted a woman defecating into a man's mouth." The episode was held by station director Michael White, and reviewed by the library board. Some members of the board wanted to cancel the series entirely, but in the end a compromise was reached. A portion of the screen was blacked out and the caption "Censored by order of the Monroe County Public Library" was displayed with the library's phone number included; the audio track, which explicitly described the image, was allowed to remain intact.

The controversies surrounding episodes 22 ("Boyz Nite In") and 24 ("A Badly Dubbed Foreign Film") entailed more media attention. Both episodes included video of penises—in the first case, two real ones, in the second case, a fake. When these episodes were held for review, it got into local newspapers.

Pack found the library's review procedures to be unclear and decried the "policy void" as "unacceptable, and perhaps even unconstitutional."

CATS has since established itself as a "dedicated constitutional forum," in part because of these disputes.

Another side effect to these clashes was to galvanize the producers. When two of the episodes were held back for review, Everson and Nickell chose to run a looping message in their place, which asked viewers to write in. "Our mailbox was stuffed for the next few weeks," Everson wrote twenty years after the fact. "Suddenly we became aware that we had an audience."

=== Second season ===
In April 1994, episode 59 generated the show's biggest controversy to date, when the hosts smoked marijuana in front of the Monroe County Courthouse, as a way of dramatizing the argument for legalization. (Marijuana was illegal everywhere in the United States at the time.) The story was covered by all three network affiliates in Indianapolis (the nearest large market) with clips from Rox landing on The Howard Stern Show and, eventually, in MTV's documentary, Straight Dope: An MTV News Special Report on Drugs.

"Local response was mostly positive," however not everyone was impressed. The Indiana Governor's Commission for a Drug-Free Indiana attempted to shut the show down, with executive director Joseph E. Mills III accusing the producers of "the overt promotion of anarchy."

=== Third season ===
Undeterred, Rox responded with episode 64, "The Overt Promotion of Anarchy," which reveled in the designation, explored the political philosophy of anarchism, documented police brutality at a Critical Mass bicycle ride, and provided explicit instructions on how to construct a "red box" for circumventing payphone fees on long-distance calls. This segment generated some attention from Indianapolis television news and newspapers.
