= Wicks Building =

- U.S. National Register of Historic Places
- U.S. Historic district – Contributing property
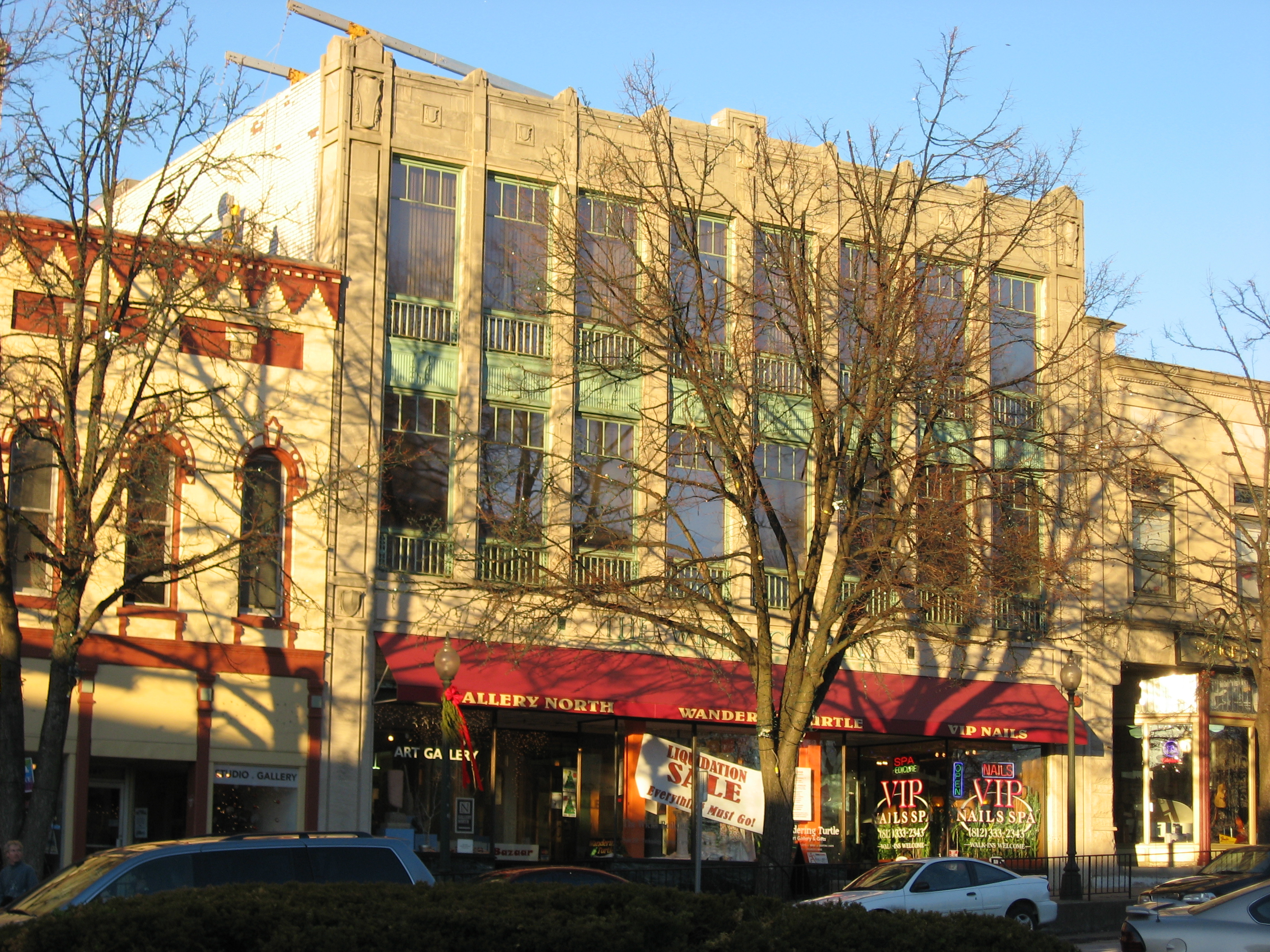
- Front of the Wicks Building

- Location within Indiana Location within the United States
- Location: 116 W. Sixth St., Bloomington, Indiana
- Coordinates: 39°10′3″N 86°32′2″W
- Area: Less than 1 acre (0.40 ha)
- Built: 1915
- Architectural style: Chicago
- Part of: Courthouse Square Historic District (ID90001931)
- NRHP reference No.: 83000141
- Added to NRHP: March 3, 1983

The Wicks Building is a historic commercial building on Courthouse Square in downtown Bloomington, Indiana, United States. Built in the early twentieth century in a distinctive style of architecture, it has remained in consistent commercial use throughout its history, and it has been named a historic site because of the importance of its architecture.

== History ==
A veteran of the Civil War, Colonel W.W. Wicks was a Bloomington businessman who owned one of the area's economically dominant limestone quarries. Because of his prosperity, he decided to diversify his business; as a result, he chose to open a general store and to enter the retail market. Unfortunately for Wicks, the destruction of his property by fire forced him to erect a new structure. Purchasing property at 116 Sixth Street on Courthouse Square, he erected the present building in 1915. One of Bloomington's first department stores, the Wicks Company operated out of the Sixth Street building until its closure in 1976.

== Architecture ==
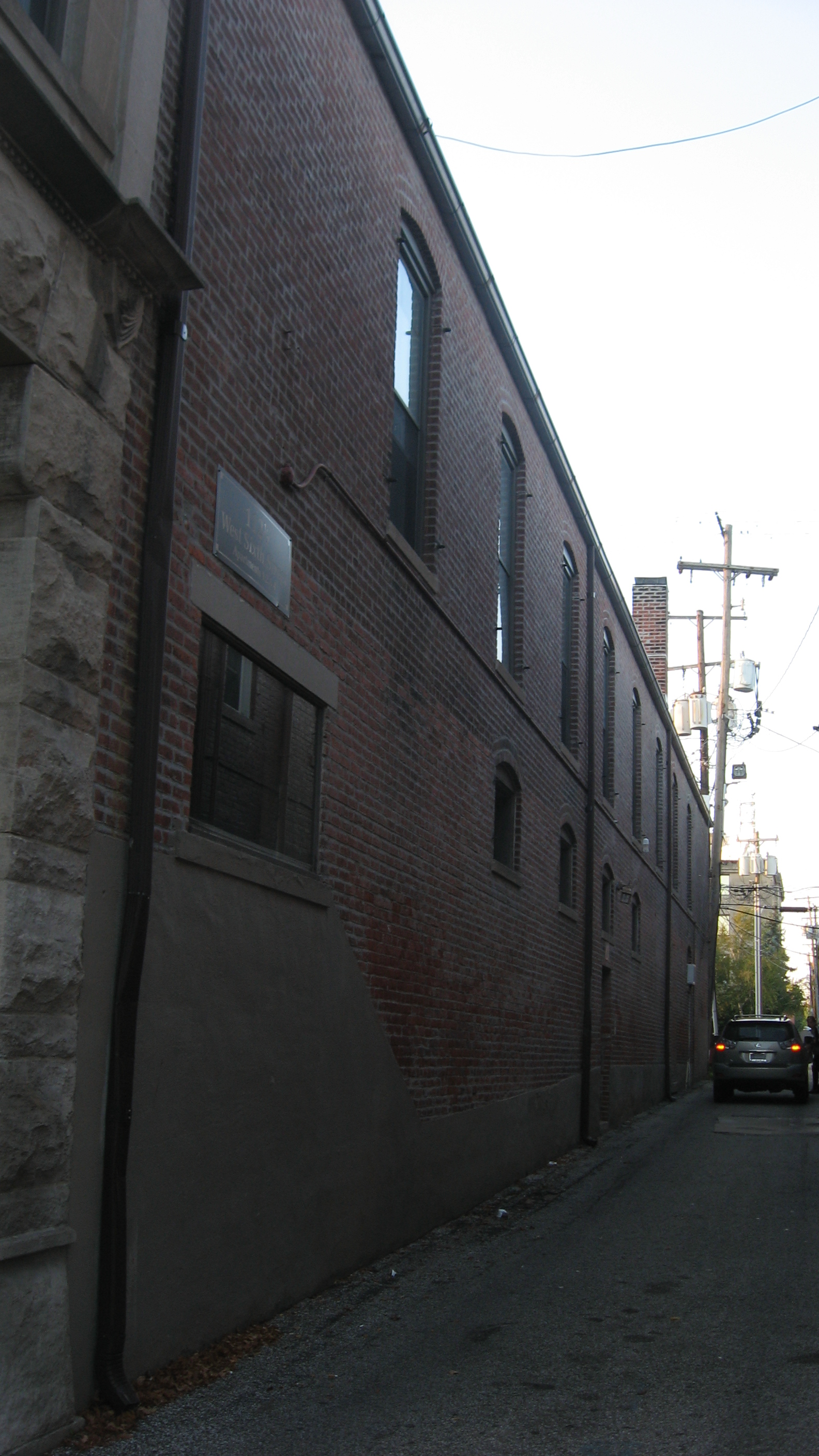
Unadorned eastern side of the building

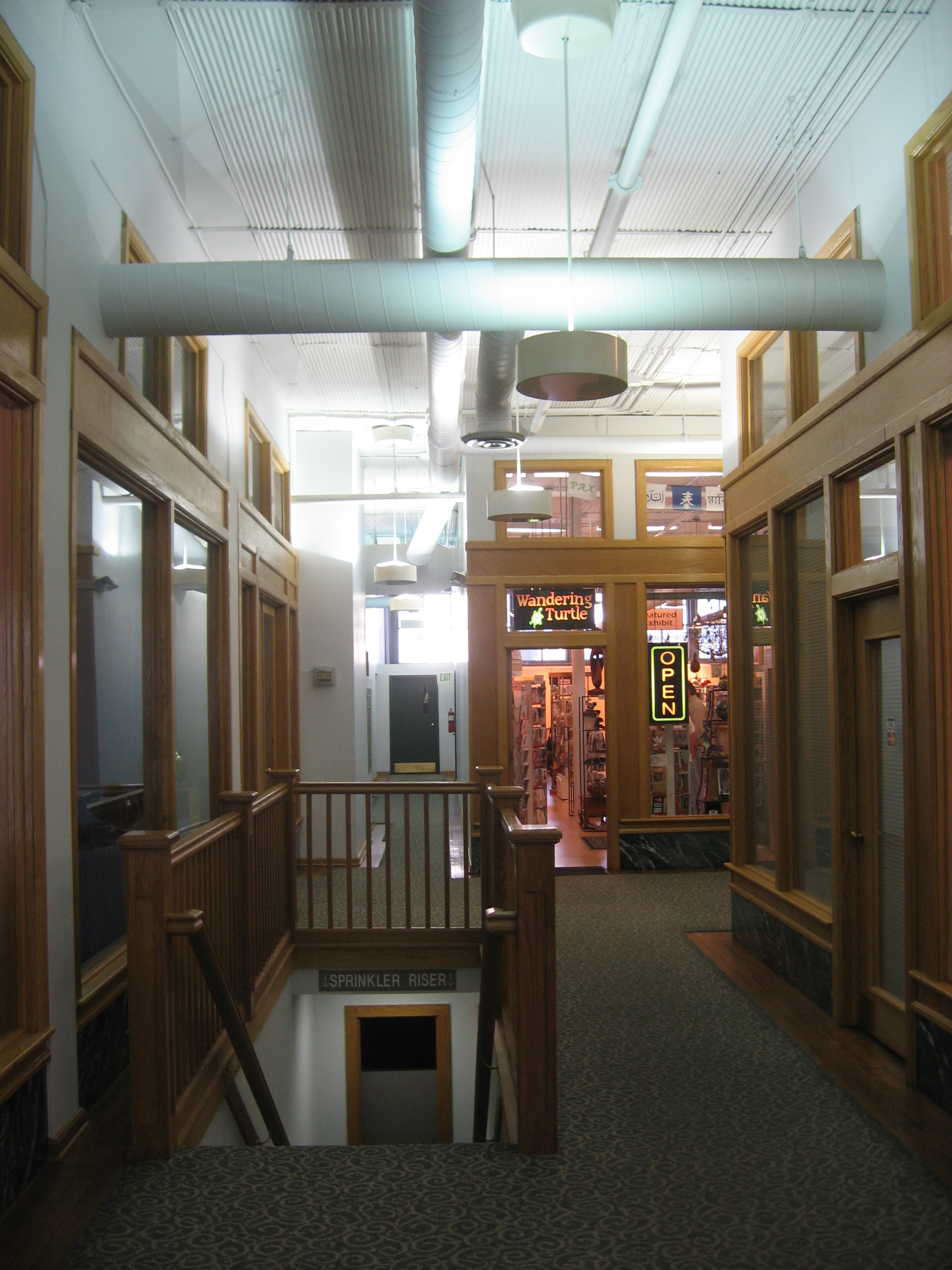
Interior

Three stories tall, the Wicks Building is a brick structure with a limestone facade. Reflecting its commercial origin, the majority of the facade is glass: the middle and upper stories feature large windows from floor to ceiling, the entirety of the first floor (aside from the entrance) is composed of display windows, and the gap between the first and second stories is filled with a large leaded glass window. Bracing the sides of the building are massive limestone piers; between them, the only non-glass surfaces in the facade are seven smaller limestone piers on the second and third stories, which separate the windows of those floors into eight bays. Below the second story and above the third are prominent horizontal limestone piers: the lower carries large letters proclaiming "The Wicks Company," while the higher lacks written details but is far taller from top to bottom.

Large numbers of ornamental details grace the building's exterior. Each of the sixteen large window bays of the second and third stories features five pieces of glass: a single large pane that occupies the vast majority of the bay's area, and four smaller panes (two above the large pane and two below) that divide the small remaining area. Cast ironwork is also common on the facade: a small balustrade of iron has been placed at the bottom of each window, and the space between the second and third story windows is composed of large iron spandrels decorated with cartouches. Similar details are reproduced in the stone of the building's summit; it is crowned by the tips of the piers, which rise slightly above the main roofline.

Aside from its facade, the Wicks Building is an undistinguished commercial structure, both in its other walls and in its ordinary rectangular shape. Surrounded by brick buildings, the side walls are plain brick, and the rear is composed of a painted brick wall, a fire escape and ordinary windows, and a service entrance. Covering the entire structure is a simple sloping roof.

Taken together, the overall design and the many details of the facade combine to form a distinctive example of the Chicago school of architecture. Most buildings in this style are significantly taller than the three stories of the Wicks, but the placement and size of the windows, the roofline, and the general plan of the building are all similar to buildings considered typical of the Chicago school.

== Historic designation ==
In 1983, the Wicks Building was listed on the National Register of Historic Places, due to its distinctive historic architecture. Key to this designation is its unusual style: no other Bloomington building that survives to the present day was built according to the Chicago school. Also of great significance is the building's rare degree of preservation: although the stonework deteriorated slightly over the building's first seventy years, the structure has remained structurally sound, and (unlike on surrounding buildings) virtually no changes to the exterior have been made since construction. In the early 1980s, the building was restored and converted to offices. It is also a contributing property to the Courthouse Square Historic District, which is listed on the National Register.
