= L.W. Thomas =

American architect

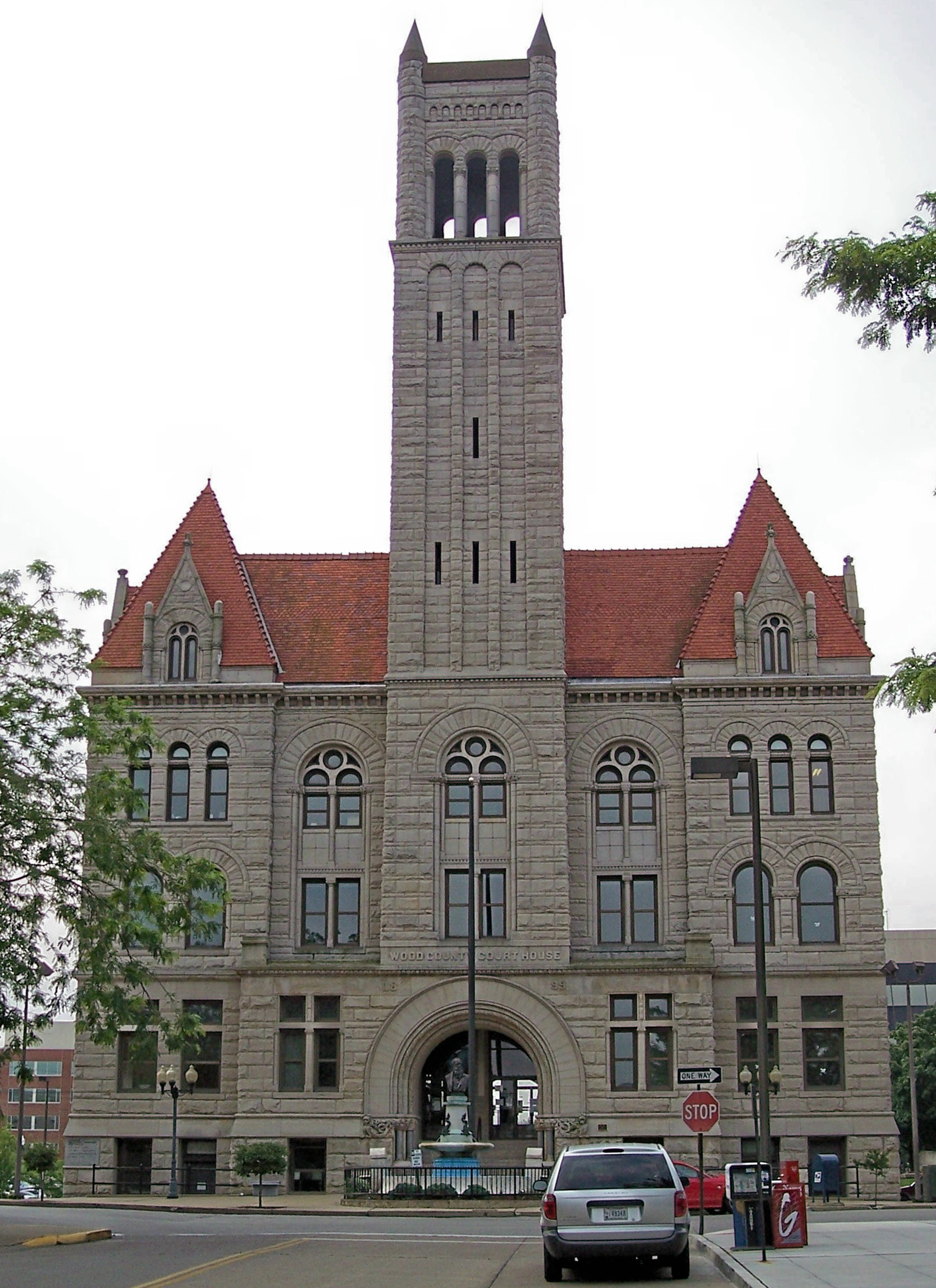
Wood County Courthouse

Lewis W. Thomas was an architect in Canton, Ohio. His work included the Wood County Courthouse in Parkersburg, West Virginia. He designed the Wood County Courthouse (1899), a Romanesque Revival structure added to the National Register of Historic Places on August 29, 1979.

Thomas was part of the Richardson & Thomas firm before establishing his own practice and worked out of Cleveland's Bangor Building.

The Woods County Courthouse is a Neo-Romanesque building in Parkersburg, West Virginia. It was built by contractor Caldwell & Drake and replaced an earlier courthouse building. It was added to the National Register of Historic Places in 1979 for its architectural significance.

He worked in the George D. Harter Bank Building.

== Projects ==
- Wood County Courthouse, including a 100' tower
- American Stove Company foundry building
- brick auditorium and market house for City of Canton
- Cleveland Foundry company factory building on Platt Street in Cleveland
- Miles Theatre (1913) in Cleveland (demolished)

Thomas prepared plans for a $100,000 Canton, Ohio, courthouse.
