= Che Mah =

Chinese dwarf

- 車馬
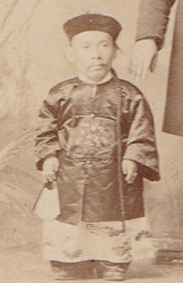
- Born: April 15, 1838; Zhoushan, China (reported)
- Died: March 21, 1926 (aged 87); Knox, Indiana, US
- Resting place: Crown Hill Cemetery, Knox, Indiana
- Other names: Che-Mah
- Known for: Circus performer
- Height: 28 in (71 cm)

Che Mah (15 April 1838 – 21 March 1926) was a Chinese dwarf. He was considered to be the world's smallest man during his life, at 28 in (71 cm).

== Biography ==
Che Mah was reported to have been born on April 15, 1838, in Ningbo on the island of Zhoushan (transcribed in contemporary sources as "Chusan" or "Choo Sang"). In 1881, he was brought to the United States, where he would travel with the Barnum and Bailey Circus. When he traveled with shows, he was considered the most polite & most intelligent dwarf on exhibition.

In 1882, he married Louisa Coleman, a trapeze artist. The couple had one son.

== Later life ==
In 1909, he married Norah Cleveland; the couple divorced in 1923. When Che Mah retired, he moved to Knox, Indiana, United States, where he would remain till his death March 21, 1926, aged 89. He is remembered as one of the most respected citizens of Knox, Indiana.
