= Stewart Hall (Morgantown, West Virginia) =

- U.S. National Register of Historic Places
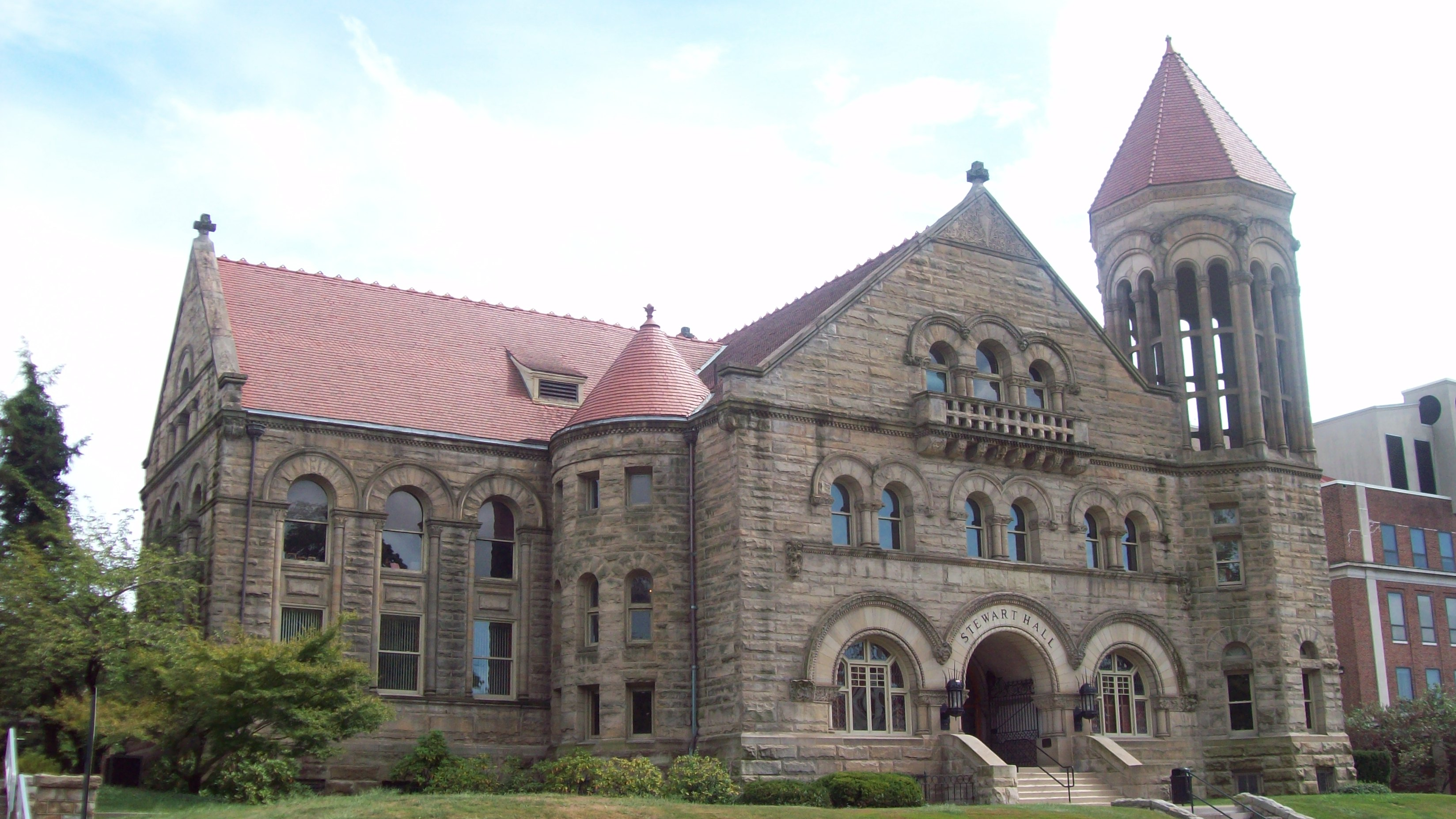
- Stewart Hall, September 2012

- Location within West Virginia Location within the United States
- Location: West Virginia University campus, Morgantown, West Virginia
- Coordinates: 39°38′3″N 79°57′16″W
- Area: 0.5 acres (0.20 ha)
- Built: 1900-1902
- Built by: Caldwell & Drake
- Architect: Wilson Bros. & Co.
- Architectural style: Romanesque
- NRHP reference No.: 80004034
- Added to NRHP: June 25, 1980

Stewart Hall is a historic library and administration building associated with the West Virginia University and located at Morgantown, Monongalia County, West Virginia. It was built between 1900 and 1902, and consists of a gabled central block, a 2 1/2-story gabled entrance pavilion, and a monumental octagonal tower. It is built of reinforced concrete and coursed Amherst sandstone blocks and is in the Romanesque Revival style. The interior features a two-story, arcaded rotunda. It housed the university library until 1931, when it became the Administration Building. It was renamed in the 1970s in honor of Irvin Stewart, president of the university from 1946 to 1958.

It was listed on the National Register of Historic Places in 1980.
