= Courthouse Square Historic District (Bloomington, Indiana) =

Historic district in Indiana, United States

- U.S. National Register of Historic Places
- U.S. Historic district
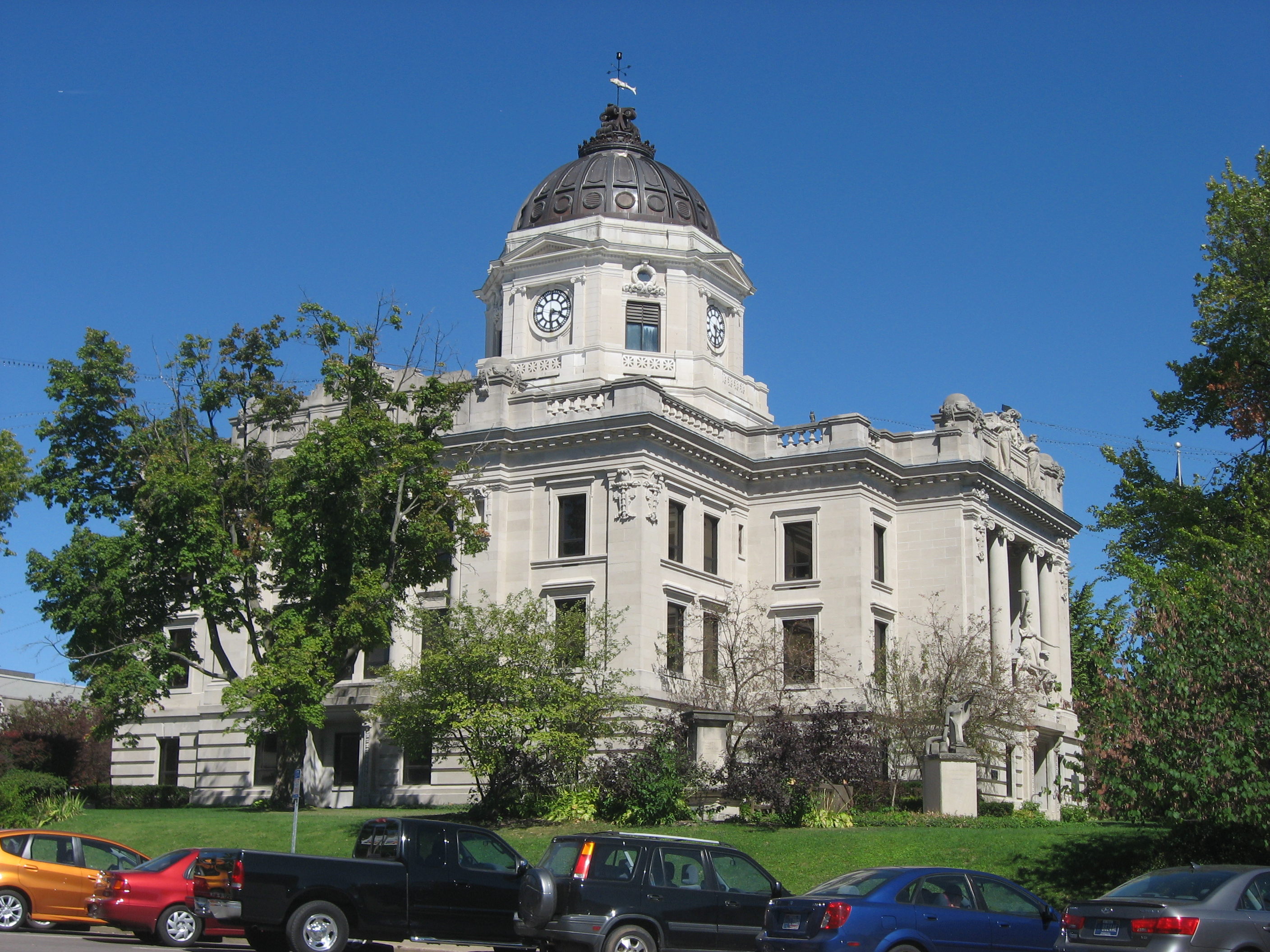
- Monroe County Courthouse, September 2010

- Location within Indiana Location within the United States
- Location: Roughly bounded by 7th, Walnut and 4th Sts. and College Ave., Bloomington, Indiana
- Coordinates: 39°10′00″N 86°32′04″W
- Area: 20 acres (8.1 ha)
- Architect: Nichols, John Lincoln; Grindle, Alfred
- Architectural style: Classical Revival, Beaux Arts, Italianate
- NRHP reference No.: 90001931
- Added to NRHP: December 18, 1990

Courthouse Square Historic District is a national historic district located at Bloomington, Indiana. The district encompasses 57 contributing buildings in the central business district of Bloomington. It developed between about 1847 and 1936, and includes notable examples of Classical Revival, Beaux Arts and Italianate style architecture. Located in the district are the separately listed Bloomington City Hall, Monroe County Courthouse, Princess Theatre, and Wicks Building. Other notable buildings include the Federal Building (c. 1912), Masonic Temple, former Faulkner Hotel (c. 1847), Odd Fellows Building (1892), Allen Building (1907), First National Bank Building (1907), Knights of Pythias Building (1907), and Graham Hotel Building.

It was listed on the National Register of Historic Places in 1990.

== Gallery ==
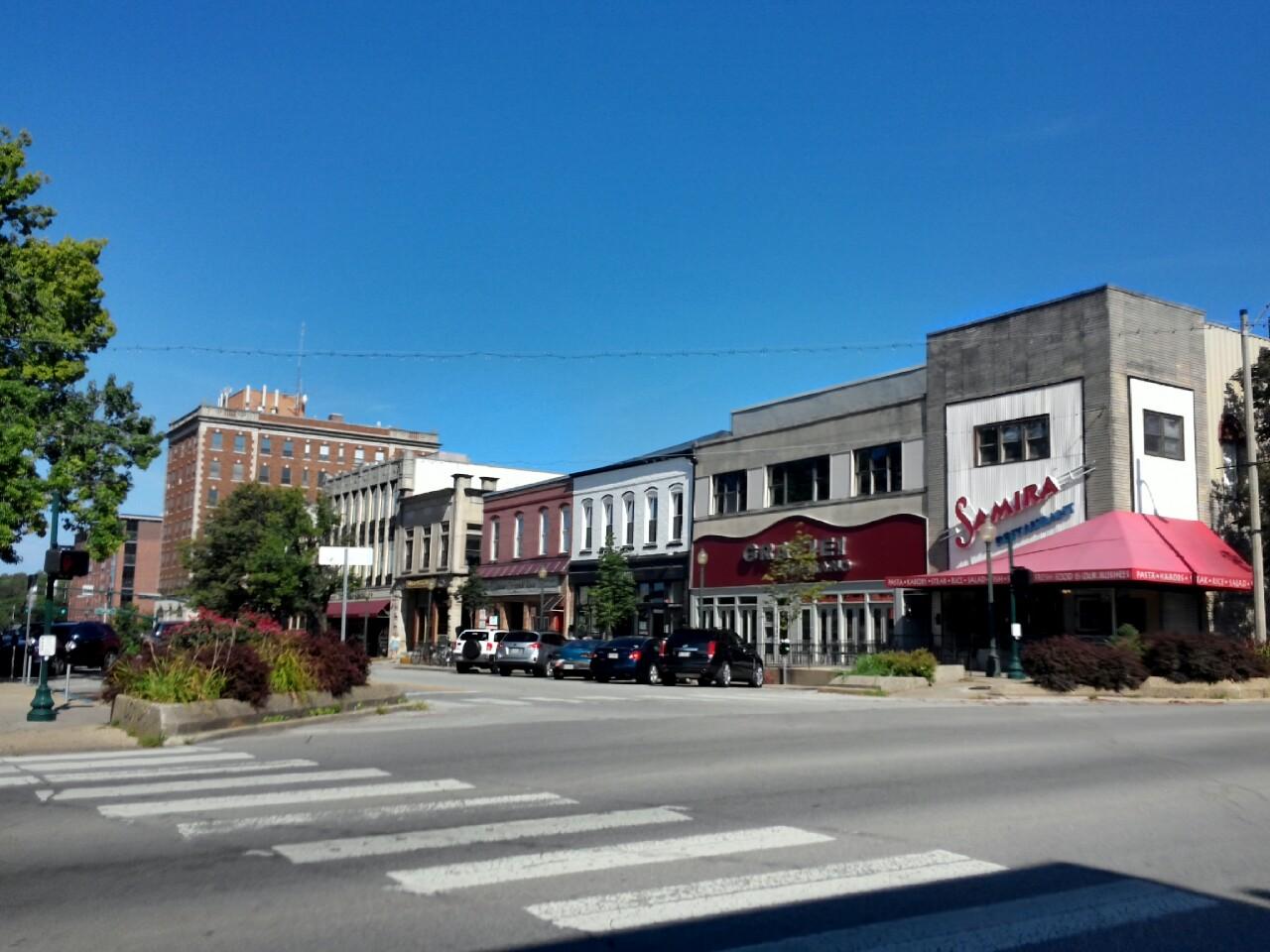
North Side of Courthouse Square, 2016

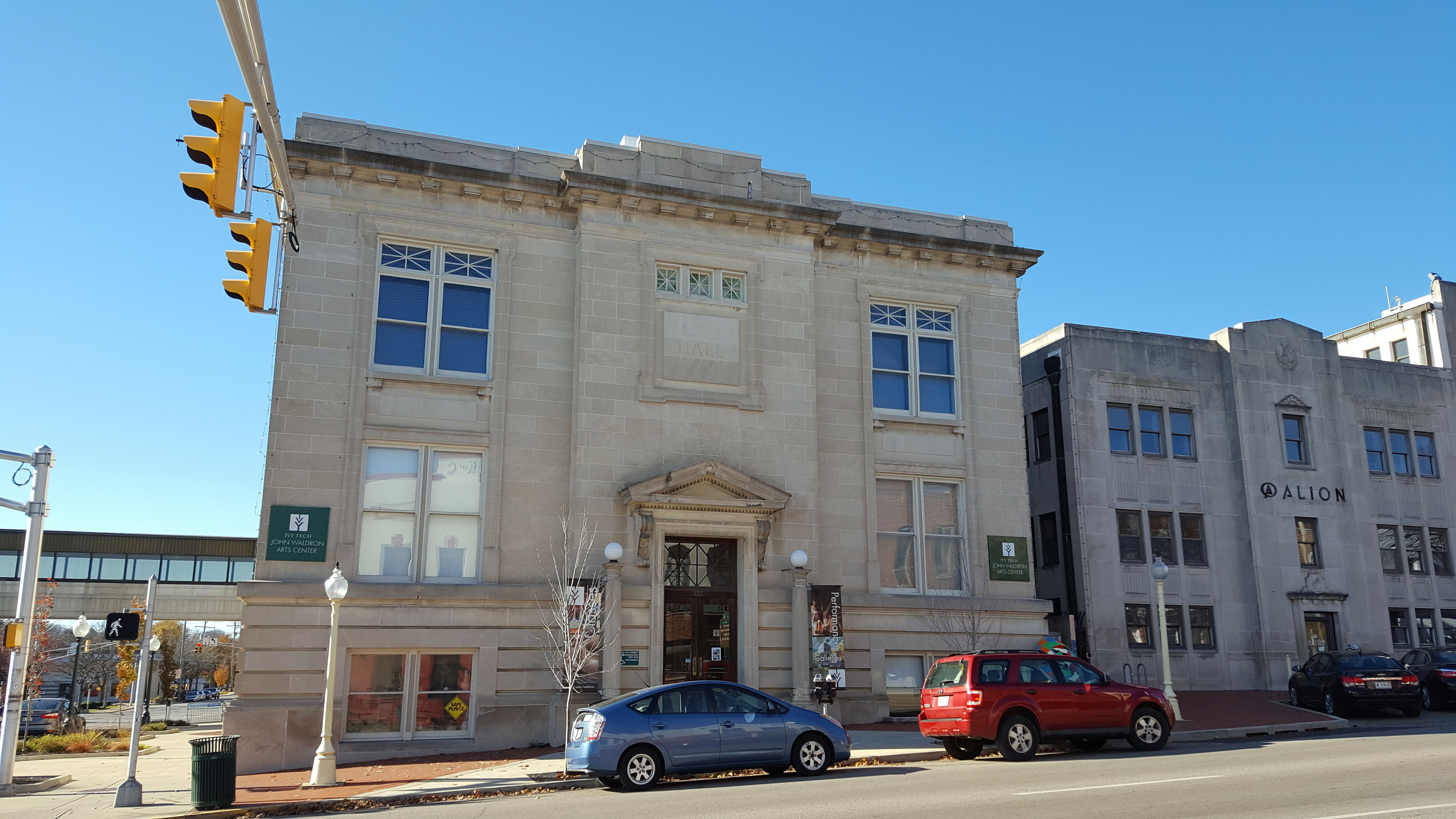
Bloomington City Hall, 2016

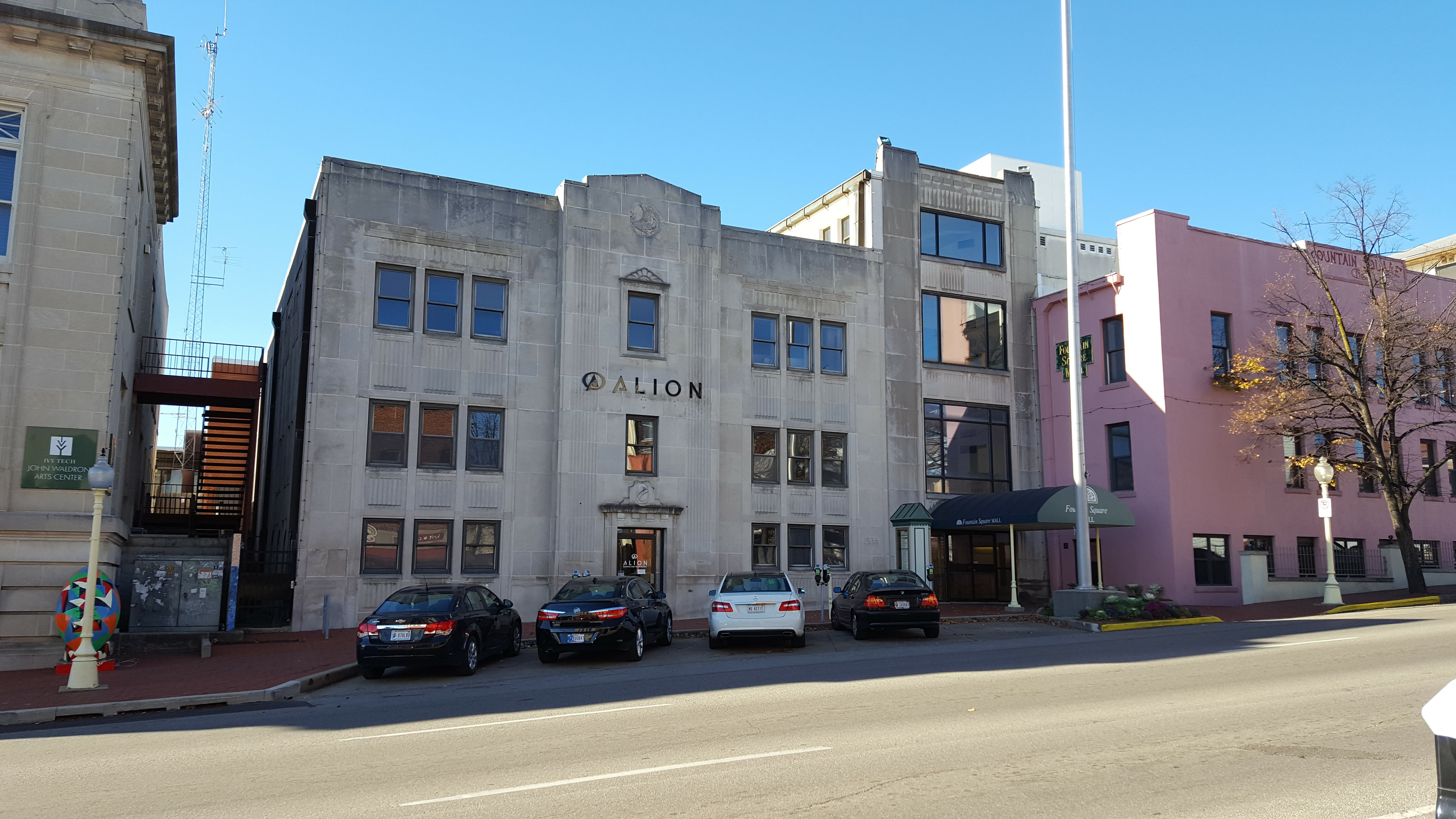
116 S. Walnut Street, 2016

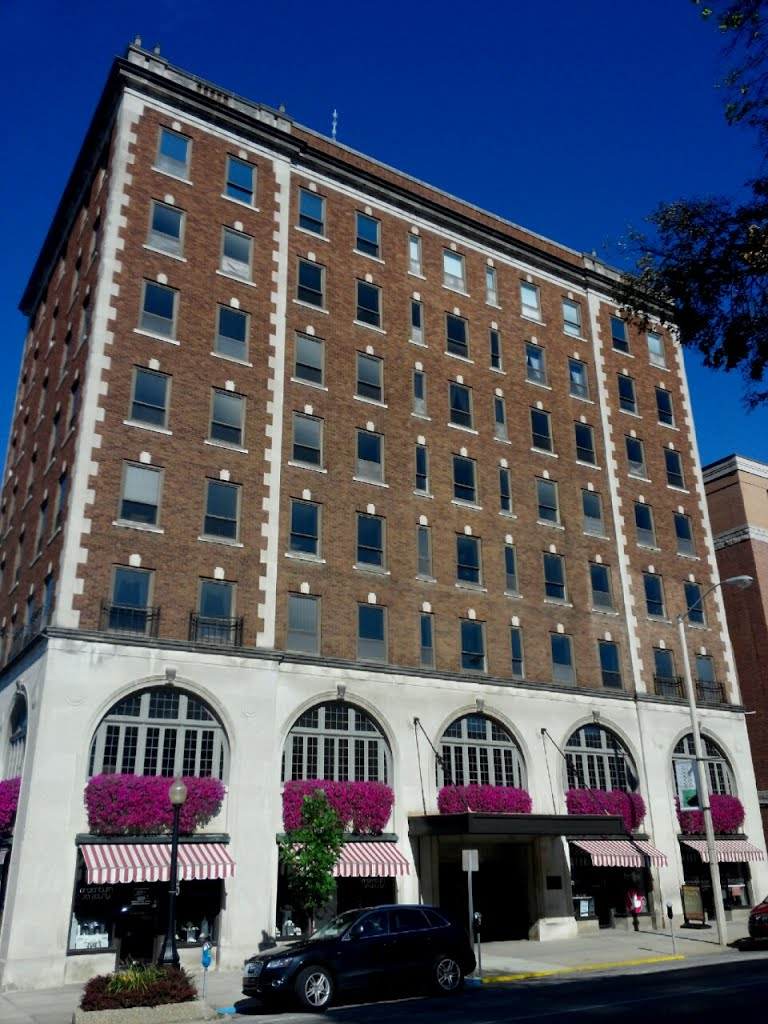
Graham Hotel Building, 2016

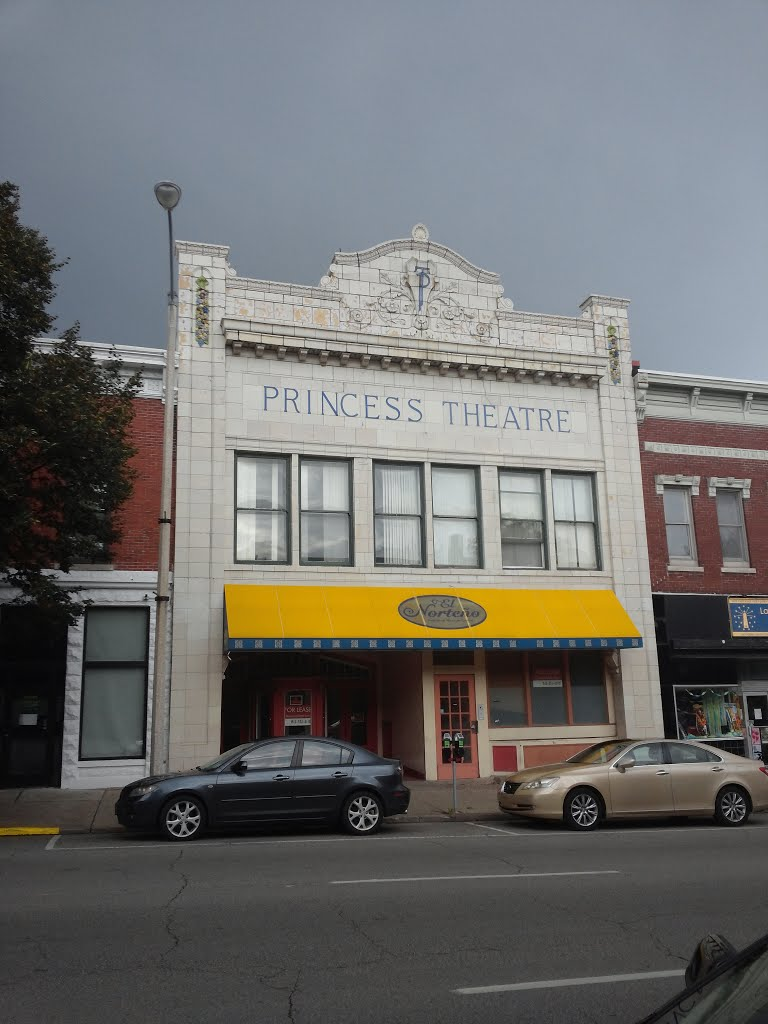
Princess Theater, 2016
