= Monroe County Courthouse (Indiana) =

- U.S. National Register of Historic Places
- U.S. Historic district – Contributing property
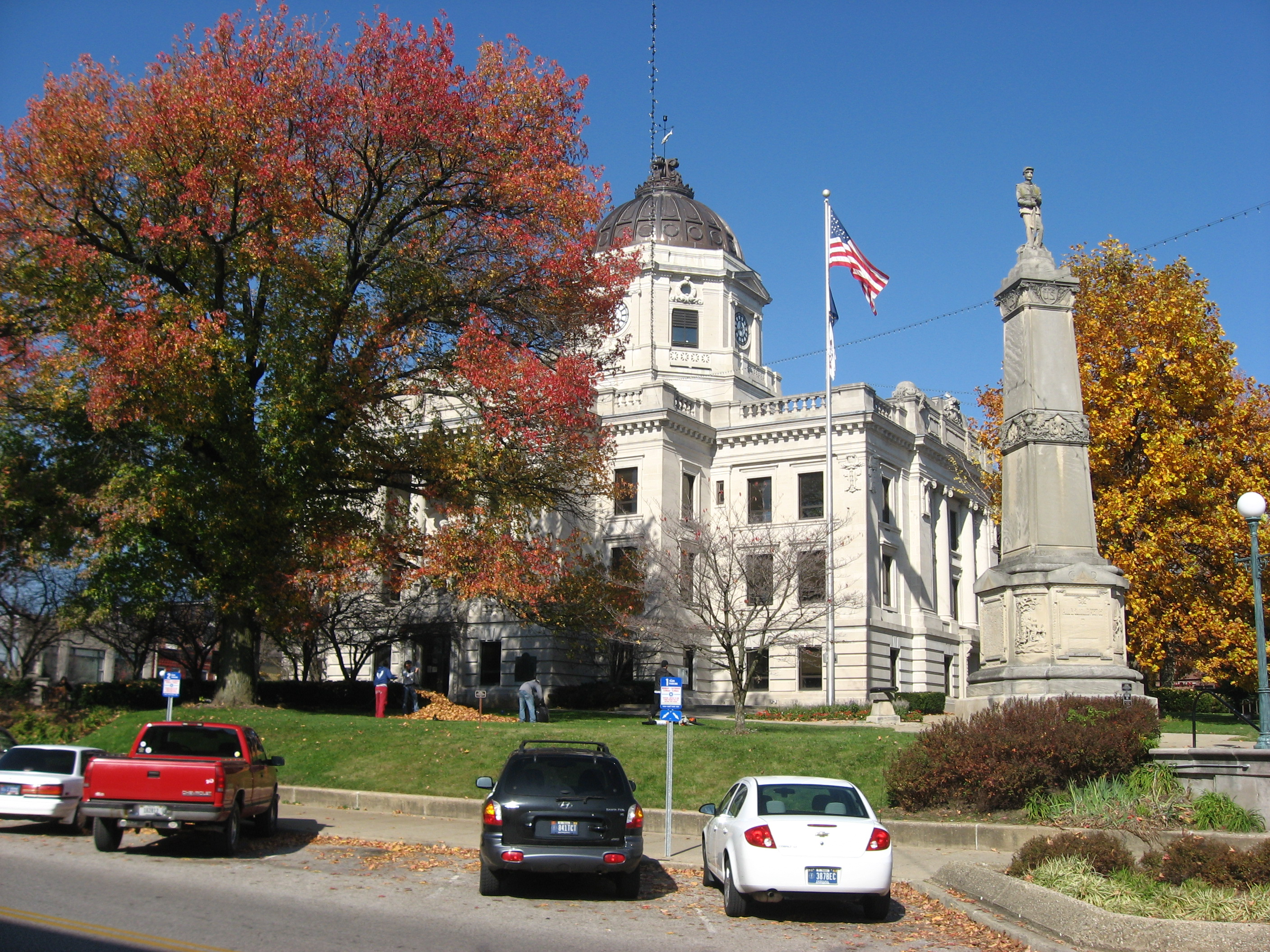
- Southern front of the courthouse

- Location within Indiana Location within the United States
- Location: Bloomington, Indiana
- Coordinates: 39°10′1″N 86°32′3″W
- Built: 1908
- Built by: Caldwell & Drake
- Architect: Wing and Mahurin of Fort Wayne
- Architectural style: Beaux Arts
- NRHP reference No.: 76000012
- Added to NRHP: October 8, 1976

Monroe County Courthouse in Bloomington, Indiana is a Beaux Arts building built in 1908. It was listed on the National Register of Historic Places in 1976. It is located in the Courthouse Square Historic District and is the seat of government for Monroe County, Indiana.

== History ==
The first Monroe County Courthouse was ordered built in 1818 by the county commissioners, as one of the earliest items of business for the new county. "On Tuesday, April 14, [1818] (the fifth day [of existence of the county]), very specific directions were written for the construction of a temporary log courthouse - a double cabin to be completed by the first of August. This log courthouse was probably located somewhere in the immediate area of where the Waldron Arts building is today."

The courthouse was built in August 1818 by Samuel Elliot. The cost of the structure was not to exceed $400. It was a single-story two-room cabin in the manner of a double log cabin. One room was 20 feet (6.1 m) square, and the other was 20 feet (6.1 m) by 12 feet (3.7 m); the two were separated by a 10-foot (3.0 m) entryway. The building was to be 10 feet (3.0 m) high to the eaves, and each room was to contain one window facing the east in order to take advantage of the sun. Villagers erected a chimney for each room after it was decided to use the structure as a school.

The log cabin courthouse was located on what now would be the south side of the square, now 116 South Walnut Street. Bloomington historian Dennis E. Matthews commissioned Jim Woods, owner of Woods and Nordberg Signs, to sketch the first courthouse in 1988. The charcoal sketch was drawn from a description by Bloomington historian Robert Leffler. Later Matthews made a model of the log cabin courthouse, which can be seen at the Monroe County History Center.

The building was unable to handle all the county's business, and in May 1819 a contract was let for the construction of a brick courthouse with a stone foundation. This replacement was finished in May 1826. It was expanded and remodeled in the 1850s and again in the 1870s.

The second courthouse was replaced with a new stone building that was designed by architects Wing and Mahurin of Fort Wayne, Indiana. It was constructed from 1907 to 1908 by contractors Drake and Caldwell, at a cost of $188,000. (Note: A $188,000 capital expense in 1908 would be roughly equivalent to $25,900,000 in 2010.) The weather vane from the old building, made of copper and shaped like a fish, was saved and used on the dome of the new courthouse. In 1984, the building received an extensive renovation costing about $2.3 million.

== In the media ==
The courthouse may be seen briefly in the 1979 film, Breaking Away.

In April 1994, the hosts of Rox smoked marijuana on the steps of the courthouse as a way of dramatizing the argument for legalization. Clips of the stunt ultimately landed on MTV.

== Gallery ==
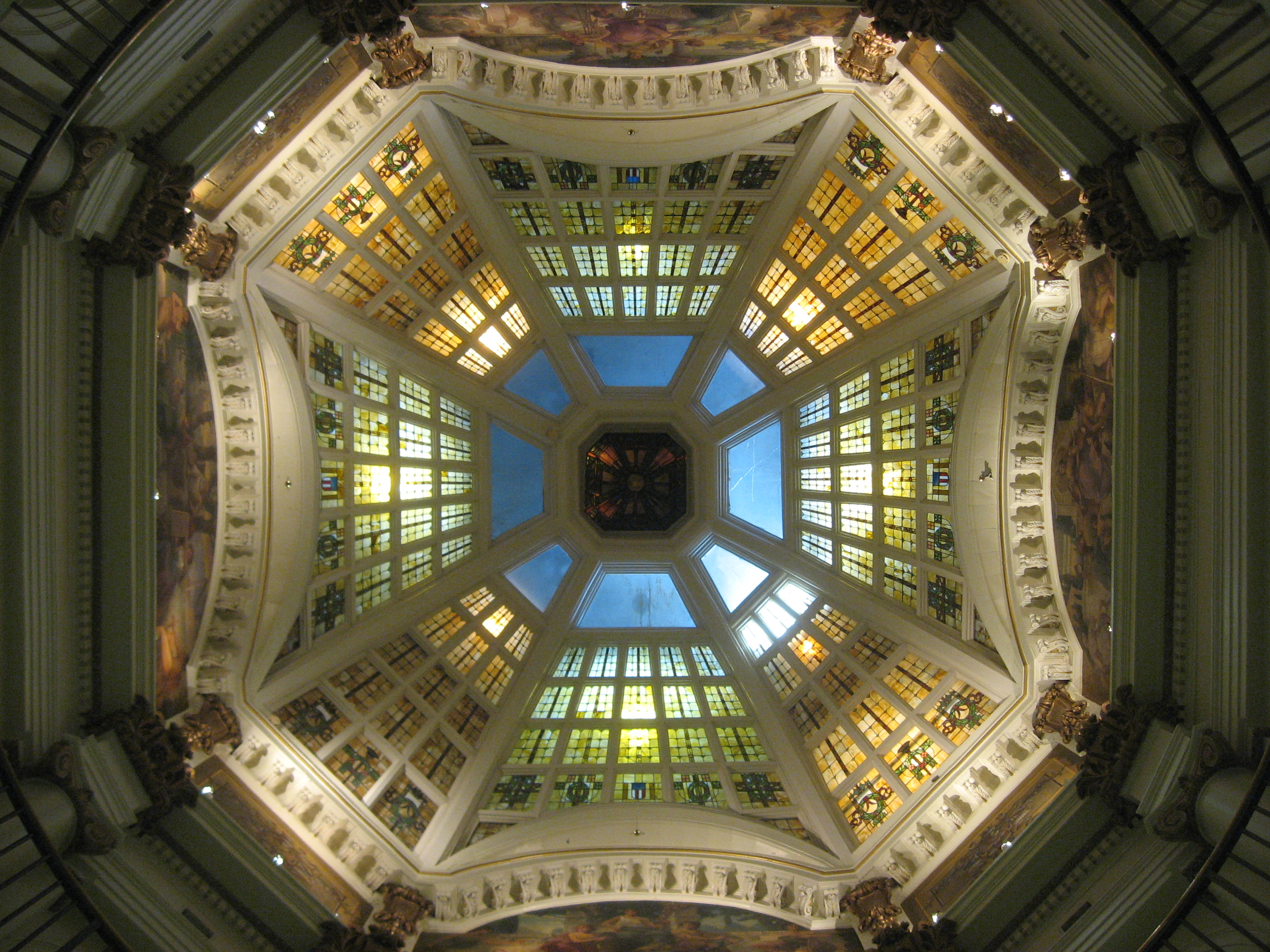
Interior of the courthouse's dome

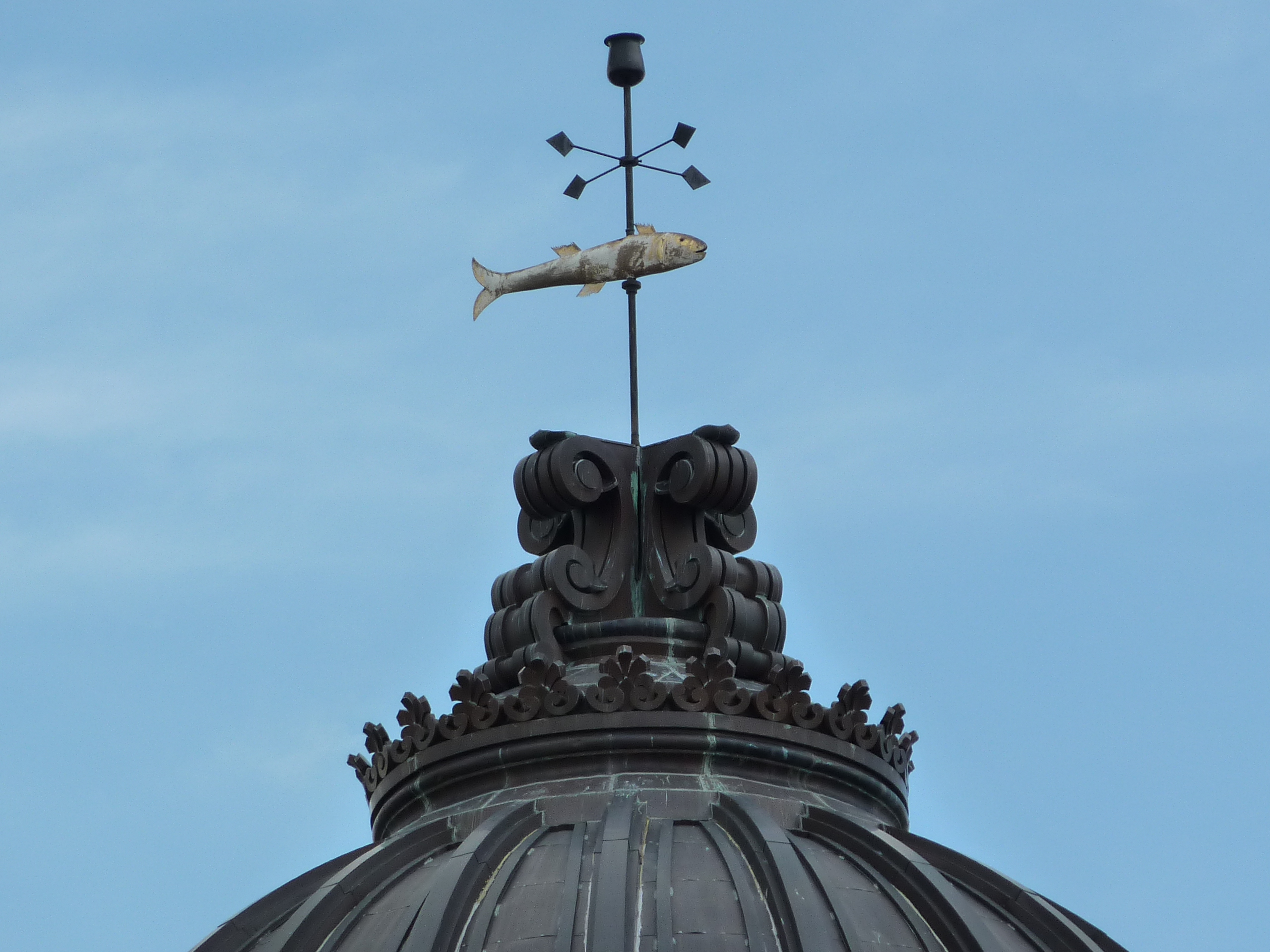
The top of the dome, with the fish weathervane

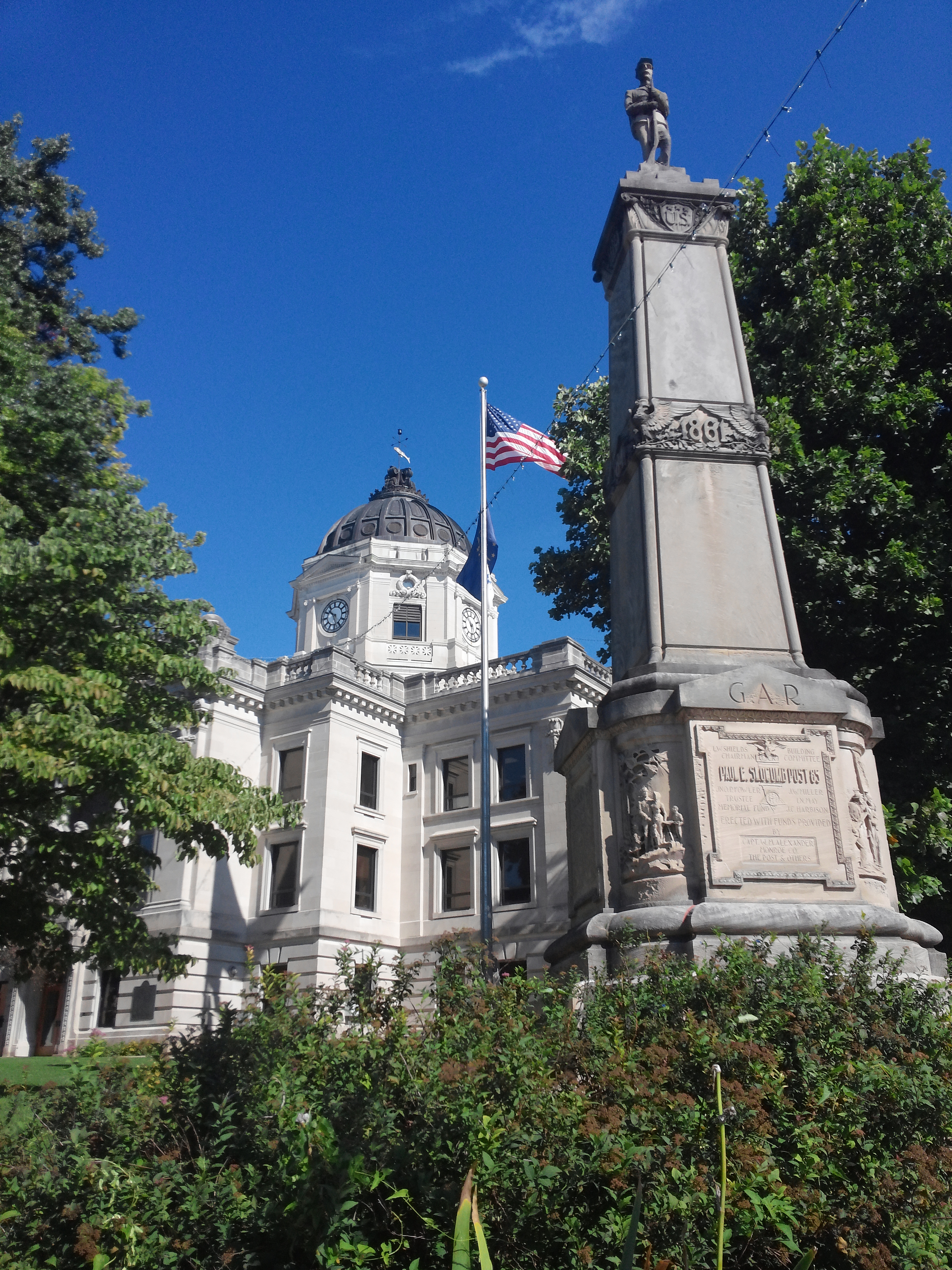
Courthouse and Civil War Monument
