= Knox, Indiana =

- City
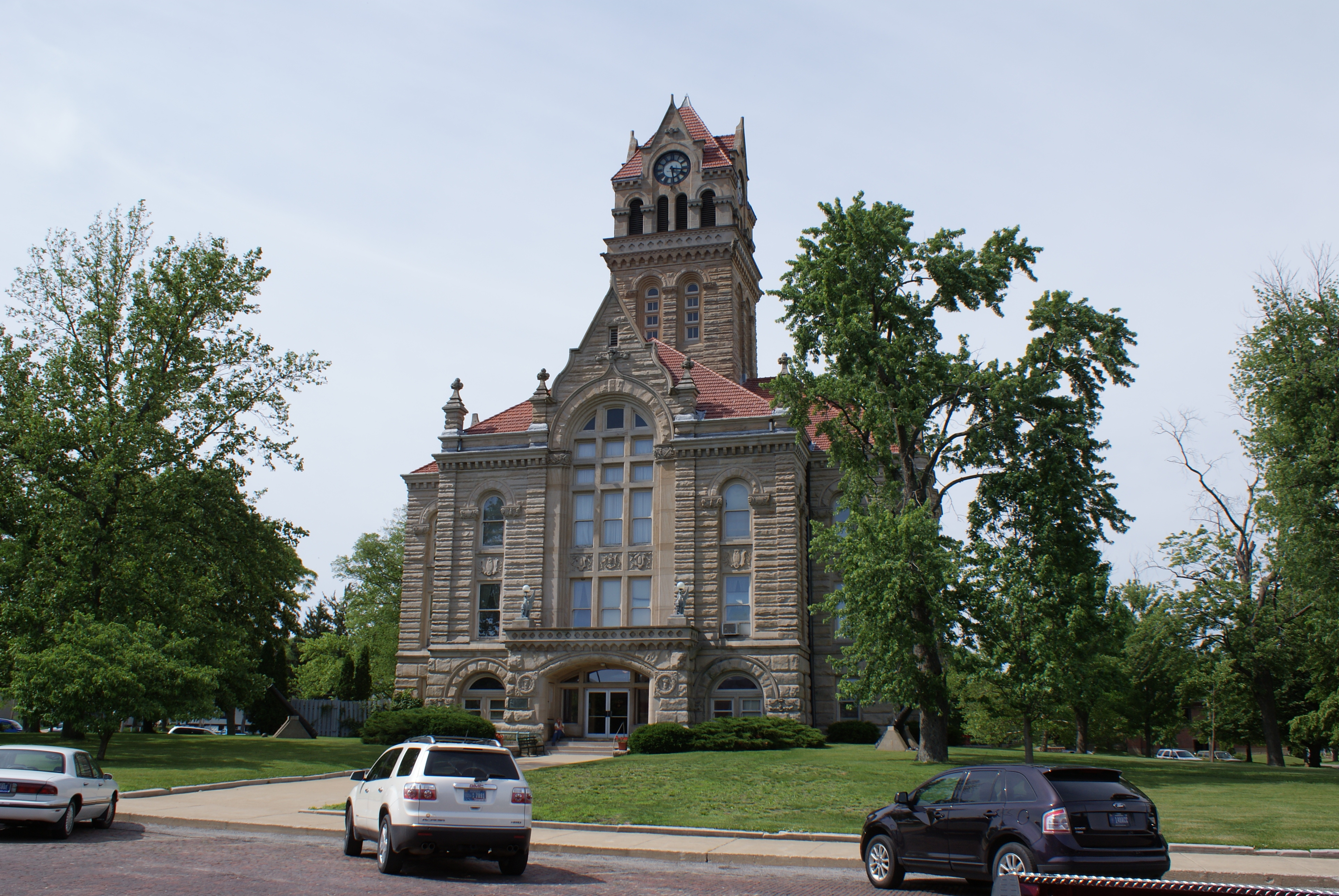
- The Starke County Courthouse in Knox is listed on the National Register of Historic Places

- Flag Seal

- Location of Knox in Starke County, Indiana.
- Coordinates: 41°17′28″N 86°37′41″W
- Country: United States
- State: Indiana
- County: Starke
- Township: Center
- Established: 1851 (founded)

Government
  - Mayor: Dennis Estok (D)

Area
  - Total: 3.96 sq mi (10.25 km^{2})
  - Land: 3.96 sq mi (10.25 km^{2})
  - Water: 0 sq mi (0.00 km^{2})
- Elevation: 712 ft (217 m)

Population (2020)
  - Total: 3,662
  - Density: 925.6/sq mi (357.38/km^{2})
- Time zone: UTC-6 (CST)
  - Summer (DST): UTC-5 (CDT)
- ZIP code: 46534
- Area code: 574
- FIPS code: 18-40374
- GNIS feature ID: 2395556
- Website: www.cityofknox.net

Knox is a city in Center Township, Starke County, in the U.S. state of Indiana. The population was 3,662 at the 2020 census. The city is the county seat of Starke County.

== History ==
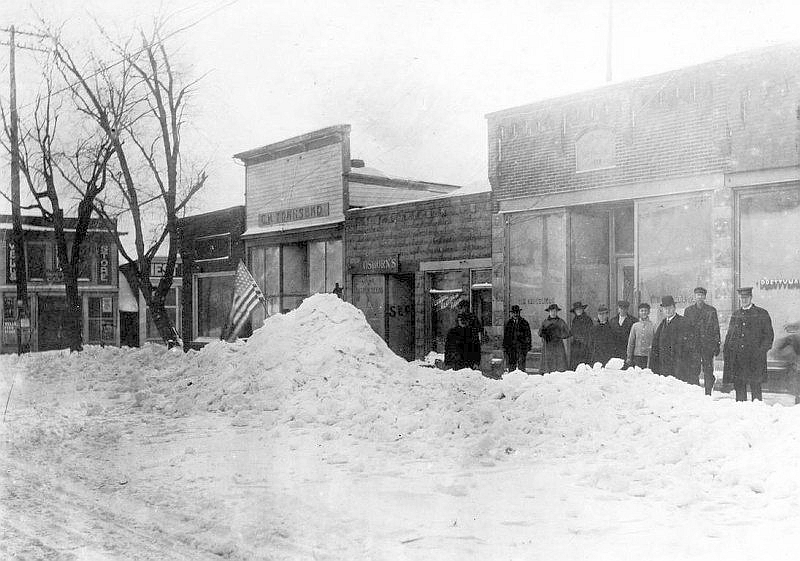
East Lake Street, January 1910

=== Establishment ===
After Starke County officially organized its own government in January 1850, County Commissioner meetings took place at a Knox home on the Yellow River. After several months of these arrangements, Knox, named after American Revolutionary War General Henry Knox, was established as the county seat on April 1, 1850. Carter D. Hathaway platted the town on June 12, 1850, and Knox Post Office was established on October 30, 1850. Knox was incorporated in 1871.

=== Railroads ===
The first of two railways in Knox was the New York, Chicago & St. Louis (Nickel Plate) Railroad, built in 1882. The second was the Indiana, Illinois & Iowa (New York Central) Railroad which was extended from North Judson in 1885; this line was later extended to South Bend in 1894. In 1964, Nickel Plate Rail merged with Norfolk and Western Railway (now Norfolk Southern Railway) who operates the rail today. The Knox Nickel Plate Depot stayed in operation for passengers until 1965 and for freight until 1984. New York Central merged with Pennsylvania Railroad in 1968 before merging into Conrail in 1976. The line was abandoned, and the tracks were removed in the 1980s.

In 1927, a watchtower and electric signals were installed on the Nickel Plate Railroad in Knox; however, once automatic crossing signals were installed in 1986, the watchtower was no longer needed. The tower was relocated to two private properties before it was restored by an Eagle Scout and eventually relocated near its original location at Wythogan Park in 2005. In 1992, the Nickel Plate Depot was bought by the Starke County Historical Society, restored, and moved to its current location across the street from Wythogan Park.

On September 17, 1991, two Norfolk Southern trains collided head-on about four miles northwest of Knox after a westbound train failed to observe rail signals and obey a stop. Four locomotives and nine train cars derailed between both trains, and hazardous material was released as the eastbound train was transporting molten sulphur. Between 40 and 100 families within a two-mile area had to be evacuated. As a result of this accident, the engineer of the eastbound train was killed while the conductor was seriously injured. All the crew on the westbound train sustained minor injuries. The Indiana Environmental Management Agency projected that 20,000 gallons of sulfur and 15,000 gallons of diesel fuel were spilled. The overall damage totaled out to 3.5 million dollars.

=== Schools ===
The first school started in 1851 out of an old log building near the present-day courthouse. Several buildings were used for schooling including the old courthouse, the log cabin, the printing office, and an old church. In 1869, land was purchased for a schoolhouse on South Main Street. Due to funding struggles, the schoolhouse took five years to complete. Once finished, this school served education up to 8th grade until it burnt down in 1894. By the end of the year, a two-story brick schoolhouse was built on the southeast corner of South Main and Delaware Street; this school was to serve all grade levels and became the first high school in Knox. A library was added to the school in 1903. The first athletic programs began at the school in 1917, and by 1927, a new gymnasium was dedicated.

The Knox School had an increase in enrollment following the closure of North Bend High School in 1931; to alleviate the density of students in one building, the Foltz School was built next to the brick schoolhouse in 1941 to serve up to 5th grade, while 6th through 12th grade stayed in the older building. The school had another increase in attendance after Center High School burnt down in 1941 causing all students to transfer to Knox. In 1943, a new school building was constructed at South Main Street and Culver Road to serve 9th through 12th grade, leaving 6th through 8th in the original building at South Main and Delaware. In 1954, another elementary school, Palmer School, was built. Both elementary schools were in use until Foltz School ended operations during the 1970s. The 1927 gymnasium was replaced with a newer one in 1955.

In 1975, construction began on the current high school building, and the new building opened in the same year. As a result, the Knox Middle School moved into the building that was the high school during the 1950s and ‘60s. The schoolhouse at South Main and Delaware was torn down in 1976 and replaced with an apartment complex. Between 2002 and 2004, the Knox Middle School was completely remodeled and expanded. In 2015, a new addition was added to the Knox Elementary School to replace the Palmer Wing, which was the original 1954 Palmer School. In April 2020, construction began for renovations throughout all three Knox Community School District school buildings and expansions at both the high school and elementary school. These renovations were finished in October 2021.

=== Library ===
The Starke County Library was founded in Knox in 1852; there is little known about the early days of the Starke County Library, other than it being under county clerk control. In 1919, the Knox Public Library was established on East Washington Street. The Knox Public Library was relocated four times between 1933 and 1962.

Knox Public Library Relocations (1933-1962)
- 1933, West Lake Street
- 1952, South Main Street
- 1956, South Pearl Street
- 1962, East Washington Street

In 1963, the Knox Public Library was officially renamed to Henry F. Schricker Public Library in homage the notable local and former two-time Indiana governor, Henry F. Schricker. By 1970, the Schricker Public Library had been incorporated into the Starke County Public Library System. In 1992, the library was relocated to its current location on Culver Road.

=== Churches ===
The first church services to establish the Knox Methodist Church started in 1843 when Rev. L.W. Monson stopped in Knox during his horse-back service routes out of Plymouth. These services were held out of resident's homes. In 1856, the Knox Methodist congregation built its first church on Main Street. The congregation later relocated to a new building at the corner of John and Bower Street in 1875. In 1891, the church was rebuilt in the same location. In 1912, the church building was moved to John and Shield Street and remodeled. That building was demolished, and the current Knox Methodist Church was built in 1987.

The Christian Church in Knox was established in 1889 as a wood-frame building on the same site as today's church. The church was later rebuilt in 1904 and stands as the current church. The Lutheran Church was organized in 1940 with a church later built on South Heaton Street.

== Geography ==
Knox is located along the Yellow River.

According to the 2010 United States census, Knox has a total area of 3.92 square miles (10.15 km^{2}), all land.

From 2014 until 2024, Knox was the geographic center of the Big Ten Conference, according to a 2018 article in fivethirtyeight.com that referred to locations of various NCAA Men's Basketball Conference championships.

== Demographics ==
Historical population
Census	Pop.	Note	%±
1860	124		—
1870	244		96.8%
1880	316		29.5%
1890	790		150.0%
1900	1,466		85.6%
1910	1,644		12.1%
1920	1,577		−4.1%
1930	1,815		15.1%
1940	2,165		19.3%
1950	3,034		40.1%
1960	3,458		14.0%
1970	3,519		1.8%
1980	3,674		4.4%
1990	3,705		0.8%
2000	3,721		0.4%
2010	3,704		−0.5%
2020	3,662		−1.1%
US Decennial Census

=== 2020 census ===
As of the 2020 census, Knox had a population of 3,662. The median age was 40.9 years. 21.8% of residents were under the age of 18 and 19.8% of residents were 65 years of age or older. For every 100 females there were 94.7 males, and for every 100 females age 18 and over there were 91.9 males age 18 and over.

0.0% of residents lived in urban areas, while 100.0% lived in rural areas.

There were 1,495 households in Knox, of which 28.7% had children under the age of 18 living in them. Of all households, 34.3% were married-couple households, 22.4% were households with a male householder and no spouse or partner present, and 32.0% were households with a female householder and no spouse or partner present. About 35.0% of all households were made up of individuals and 16.5% had someone living alone who was 65 years of age or older.

There were 1,670 housing units, of which 10.5% were vacant. The homeowner vacancy rate was 2.7% and the rental vacancy rate was 9.5%.

Racial composition as of the 2020 census
Race	Number	Percent
White	3,416	93.3%
Black or African American	11	0.3%
American Indian and Alaska Native	24	0.7%
Asian	10	0.3%
Native Hawaiian and Other Pacific Islander	1	0.0%
Some other race	35	1.0%
Two or more races	165	4.5%
Hispanic or Latino (of any race)	129	3.5%

=== 2010 census ===
As of the 2010 census, there were 3,704 people, 1,457 households, and 975 families in the city. The population density was 944.9 inhabitants per square mile (364.8/km^{2}). There were 1,633 housing units at an average density of 416.6 per square mile (160.9/km^{2}). The racial makeup of the city was 95.3% White, 0.3% African American, 0.2% Native American, 0.3% Asian, 0.4% from other races, and 1% from two or more races. Hispanic or Latino of any race were 2.9% of the population.

There were 1,457 households, of which 34.8% had children under the age of 18 living with them, 41% were married couples living together, 14% had a female householder with no husband present, 6.9% had a male householder with no wife present, and 33.1% were non-families. 27.9% of all households were made up of individuals, and 13.6% had someone living alone who was 65 years of age or older. The average household size was 2.53 and the average family size was 3.03.

The median age in the city was 36.2 years. 26% of residents were under the age of 18; 10.1% were between the ages of 18 and 24; 24.5% were from 25 to 44; 25.8% were from 45 to 64; and 13.5% were 65 years of age or older. The gender makeup of the city was 46.3% male and 53.7% female.

=== 2000 census ===
As of the 2000 United States census there were 3,721 people, 1,466 households, and 961 families in the city. The population density was 947.3 inhabitants per square mile (365.8/km^{2}). There were 1,586 housing units at an average density of 403.8 per square mile (155.9/km^{2}). The racial makeup of the city was 97.29% White, 0.11% African American, 0.24% Native American, 0.30% Asian, 0.03% Pacific Islander, 0.99% from other races, and 1.05% from two or more races. Hispanic or Latino of any race were 2.28% of the population.

There were 1,465 households, out of which 31.2% had children under the age of 18 living with them, 46.8% were married couples living together, 14.3% had a female householder with no husband present, and 34.4% were non-families. 30.6% of all households were made up of individuals, and 14.8% had someone living alone who was 65 years of age or older. The average household size was 2.43 and the average family size was 3.01.

The city population contained 25.6% under the age of 18, 8.2% from 18 to 24, 28.1% from 25 to 44, 20.5% from 45 to 64, and 17.6% who were 65 years of age or older. The median age was 37 years. For every 100 females, there were 90.4 males. For every 100 females age 18 and over, there were 87.7 males.

The median income for a household in the city was $29,891, and the median income for a family was $35,615. Males had a median income of $30,585 versus $20,994 for females. The per capita income for the city was $16,184. About 17.9% of families and 16.5% of the population were below the poverty line, including 24.9% of those under age 18 and 12.6% of those age 65 or over.

== Education ==
The public school system of Knox consists of Knox Community Elementary School (K-4th grade), Knox Community Middle School (5-8th grade), and Knox Community High School (9-12th grade). The schools are located at 1 Redskin Trail. Total enrolment is between 800 and 900 students.

The high school has a marching band program. The Knox Redskin Brigade is a 1996, 1998, 2000, 2001, 2002 and 2003 I.S.S.M.A. Class D State finalist; a 1988, 1991, 1992 and 2017 I.S.S.M.A. Class C State finalist; the 2005 Bands of America Indianapolis Regional Class A Champion. Knox High is the nation's first Conn-Selmer All-American High School.

Based on the 2009–10 school year, the Knox High School Student body consists of 51% males and 49% females, and a minority enrollment of 5%.

Knox has a public library, a branch of the Starke County Public Library System.

== Notable people ==
- Stuart Gorrell, wrote the lyrics for the song "Georgia on My Mind"
- Che Mah, one of the shortest men in the world in his lifetime
- Henry F. Schricker, two-time Indiana Governor

== Media ==
- WKVI 1520 AM and 99.3 FM. Locally owned by Kankakee Valley Broadcasting Company, serving the area since 1969.

== In popular culture ==
The PBS Kids television series Postcards from Buster filmed its first episode, "Meet Me At the Fair" (2004), in Knox.

Knox features in the 2013 film Bridegroom, the fact-based story of Knox resident Tom Bridegroom.

In June 2015, the economic reporting site "24/7 Wall St.com" listed Knox as the Indiana city with the lowest average college graduation level - 5.5% of adults have a bachelor's degree or higher, compared to the statewide rate of 23.2% and the national rate of 28.8%; and reported that the city's median household income of $30,300 was $75,000 less than the median household income of Indiana's wealthiest town, Zionsville.
