= Wood County Courthouse (West Virginia) =

- U.S. National Register of Historic Places
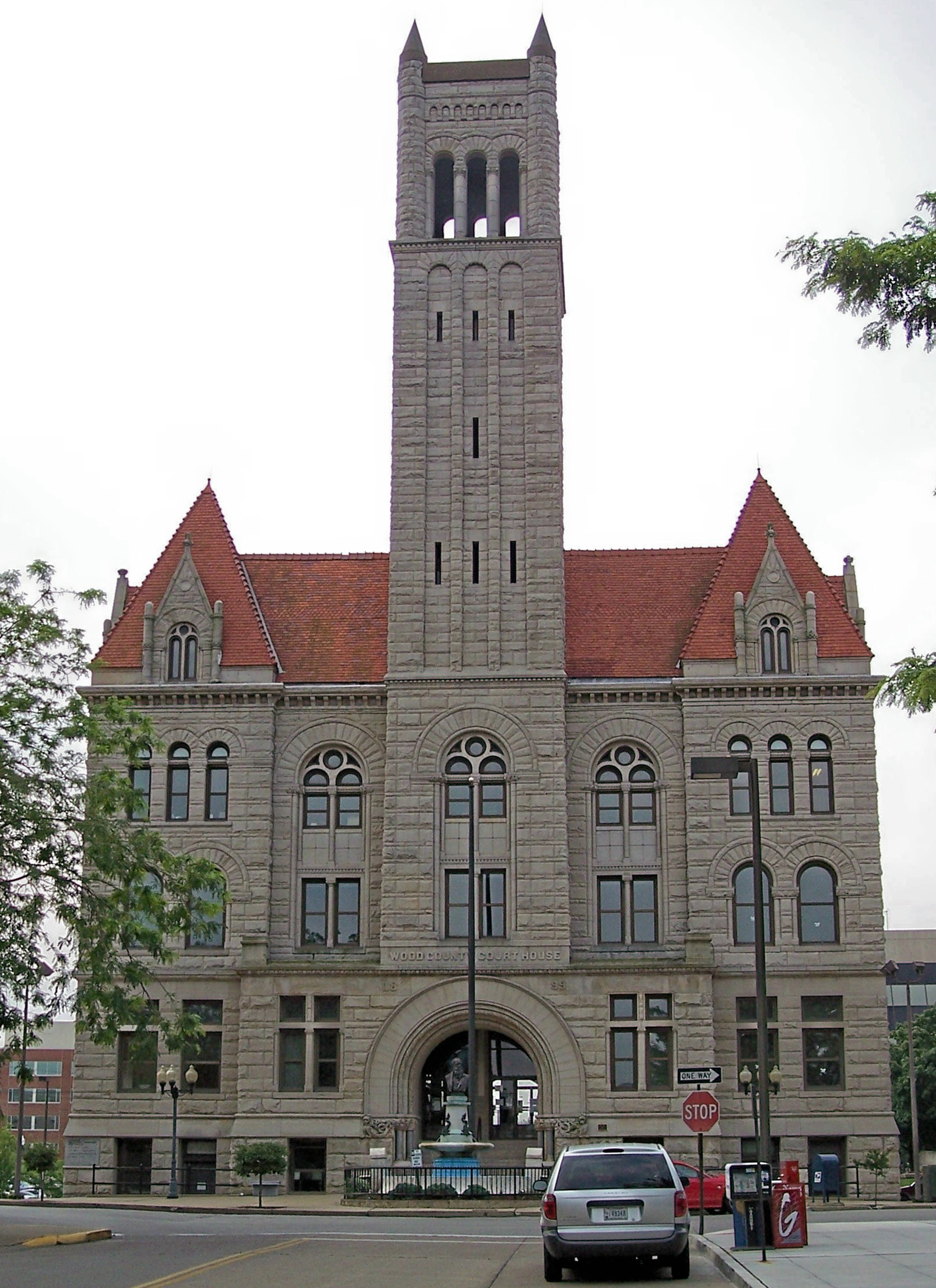
- The Wood County Courthouse in 2006

- Location within West Virginia Location within the United States
- Location: Court Sq. at 3rd and Market St., Parkersburg, West Virginia
- Coordinates: 39°15′53″N 81°33′46″W
- Area: 1.3 acres (0.53 ha)
- Built: 1899
- Built by: Caldwell & Drake
- Architect: L. W. Thomas
- Architectural style: Romanesque Revival
- NRHP reference No.: 79002606
- Added to NRHP: August 29, 1979

The Wood County Courthouse is a public building in downtown Parkersburg, West Virginia, in the United States. The courthouse was built in 1899 at a cost of $100,000 in the Richardsonian Romanesque style by local contractors Caldwell & Drake, according to the plans of architect L. W. Thomas of Canton, Ohio. The current courthouse is the fifth to be built in the county replacing one built in 1860. It was added to the National Register of Historic Places in 1979 for its architectural significance. During his 1912 presidential campaign Theodore Roosevelt stopped in Parkersburg and spoke from the Market street entrance of the courthouse. On 2 July 2020 a new steeple was added to the bell tower replacing one that had been removed in 1952. With the new steeple the courthouse is now the tallest in the state at 164 ft.

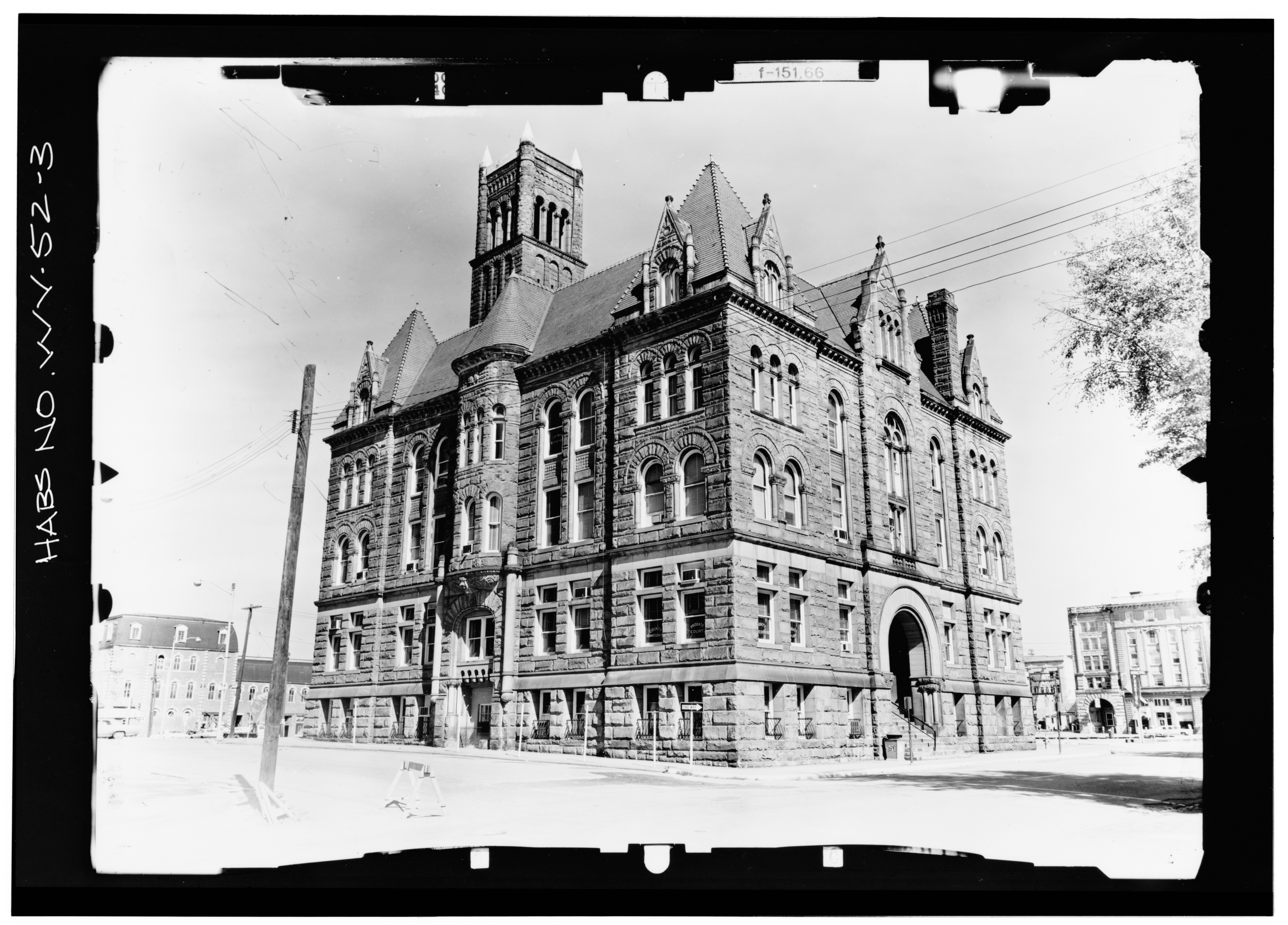
Wood County Courthouse in the 1970s after urban renewal projects in downtown.

== See also ==
- National Register of Historic Places listings in Wood County, West Virginia
