= Hotel Sansone =

- U.S. National Register of Historic Places
- Location within Missouri Location within the United States
- Location: 312 Park Central East, Springfield, Missouri
- Coordinates: 37°12′32″N 93°17′25″W
- Area: less than one acre
- Built: 1911
- Architect: Hunt, Frank W.; Caldwell and Drake
- Architectural style: Bungalow/craftsman
- MPS: Springfield, Missouri MPS (Additional Documentation)
- NRHP reference No.: 00000430
- Added to NRHP: May 5, 2000

Hotel Sansone, also known as the Hotel Springfield and Hotel Sterling, is a historic hotel building located in Springfield, Missouri, United States. Built in 1911, it is a four-story American Craftsman style brick building. It measures 44 feet wide by 110 feet deep. It features a stepped parapet, beneath which is set a shallow overhanging hip roof sheathed with green Spanish tiles, and supported by heavy carved wooden brackets.

It was listed on the National Register of Historic Places in 2000.
