= Clear Creek (Salt Creek tributary) =

Creek in Monroe County, Indiana

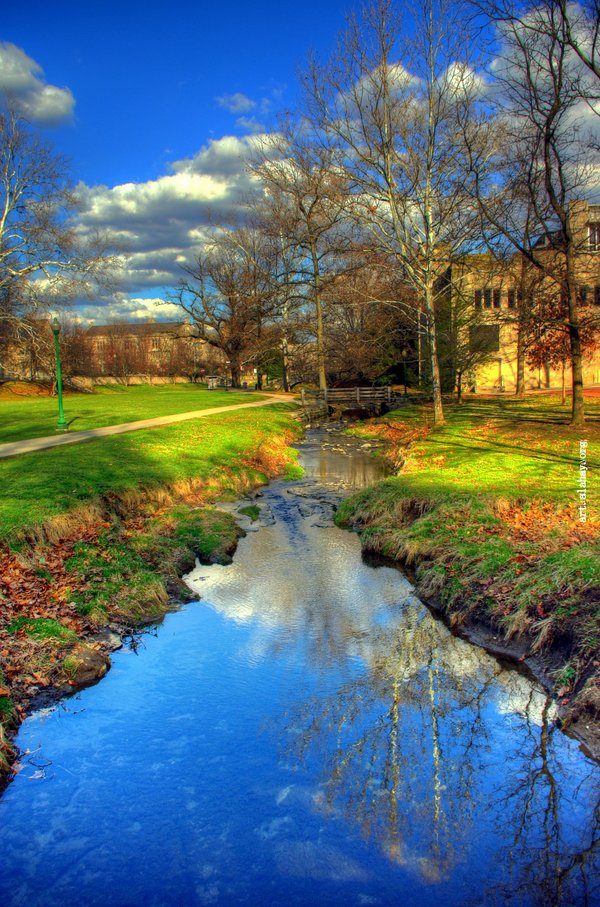
Campus River near the IMU

Clear Creek is an American creek in Monroe County, Indiana. Flowing in the general south-western and southern direction, it is a tributary of Salt Creek, which in its turn flows into the East Fork of Indiana's White River.

Clear Creek drains about 2/3 of the city of Bloomington (most of the city, except for its northern part, which drains to the north, into Griffy Lake and Beanblossom Creek). Clear Creek flows roughly in the west-south-westerly direction across the campus of Indiana University, passing in front of its major landmark, the Indiana Memorial Union. On campus, the creek was formerly known as the Jordan River, named so after David Starr Jordan, the seventh president of Indiana University and later the first president of Stanford University. Following controversy surrounding Jordan's support of eugenics, the "Jordan River" was renamed to the Campus River in 2020 by the IU Board of Trustees along with several buildings on campus.

Clear Creek crosses downtown Bloomington via underground pipes. It emerges to the surface near the southern edge of the downtown and flows south across the southern half of Bloomington (Perry Township). After leaving the city limits, the creek flows through Clear Creek Town, and Clear Creek Township, both of which (as well as various objects and institutions in the area) are named after the creek. Despite its name, Clear Creek Town is not in Clear Creek Township, but in the neighboring Perry Township.

Clear Creek flows into Salt Creek near the southern border of Monroe County, south of Harrodsburg and a short distance downstream from the dam of Lake Monroe (38°59′40″N 86°30′49″W).

== Tributaries ==
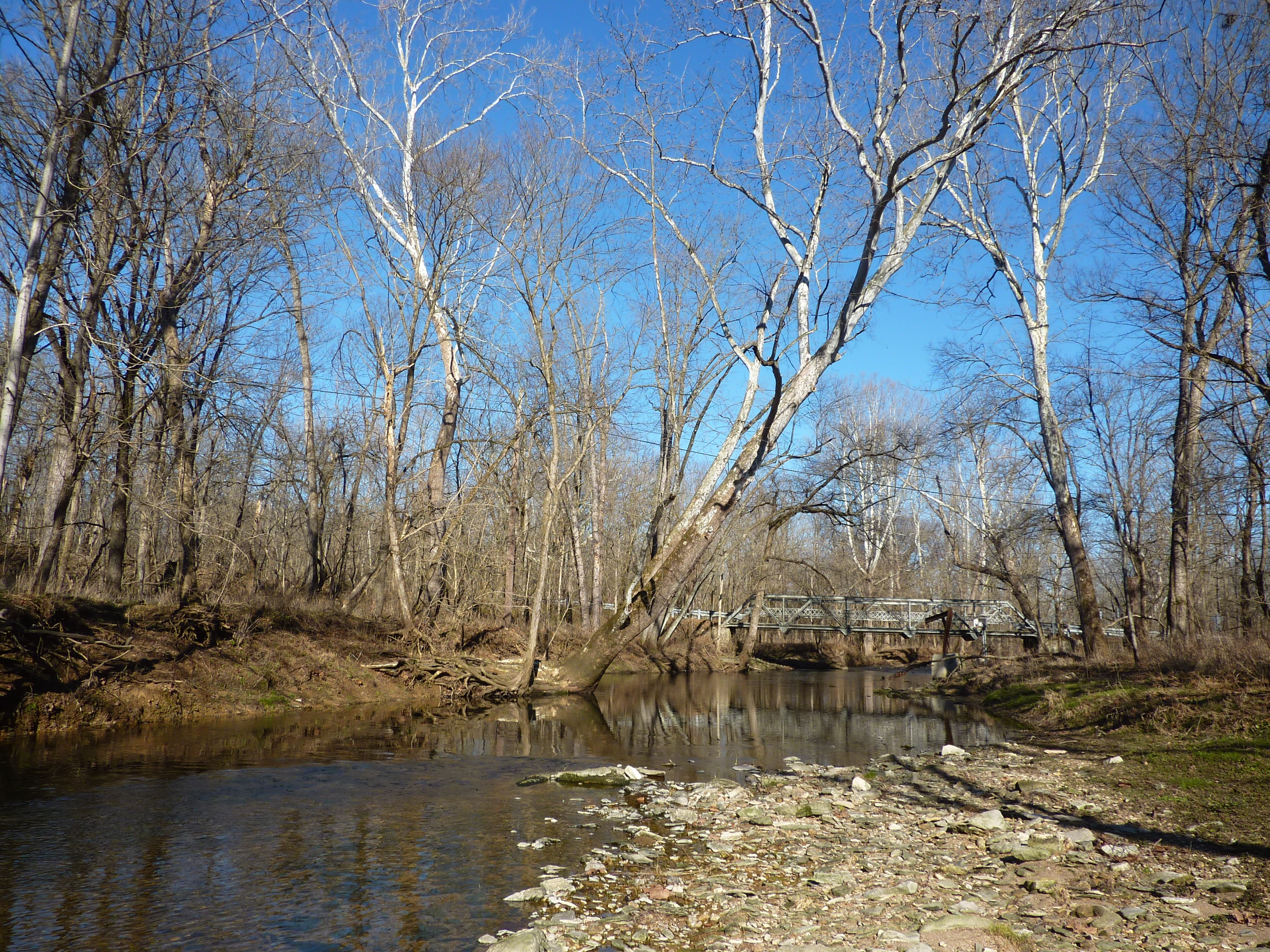
Clear Creek near Dillman Rd (Perry Township)

Clear Creek's main tributaries are Jackson Creek, Sinking Creek, and West Fork Clear Creek.

Jackson Creek drains the south-eastern part of Bloomington.

West Fork Clear Creek flows along the west side of Bloomington, joining the "main" Clear Creek on the south side of the town. A dam was constructed on the West Fork Clear Creek early in the 20th century, forming a small reservoir known as the Wapehani Lake or Weimer Lake. The Lake was originally constructed as a water source for Bloomington's water supply system, but it does not have that function any more, because two much larger reservoirs, Lake Monroe and Lake Lemon, elsewhere in Monroe County have been used for this purpose since the 1950s. Now the area around the Wapehani Lake is designated as Wapehani Mountain Bike Park. The dam, however, was demolished in 2018, and the lake was drained.

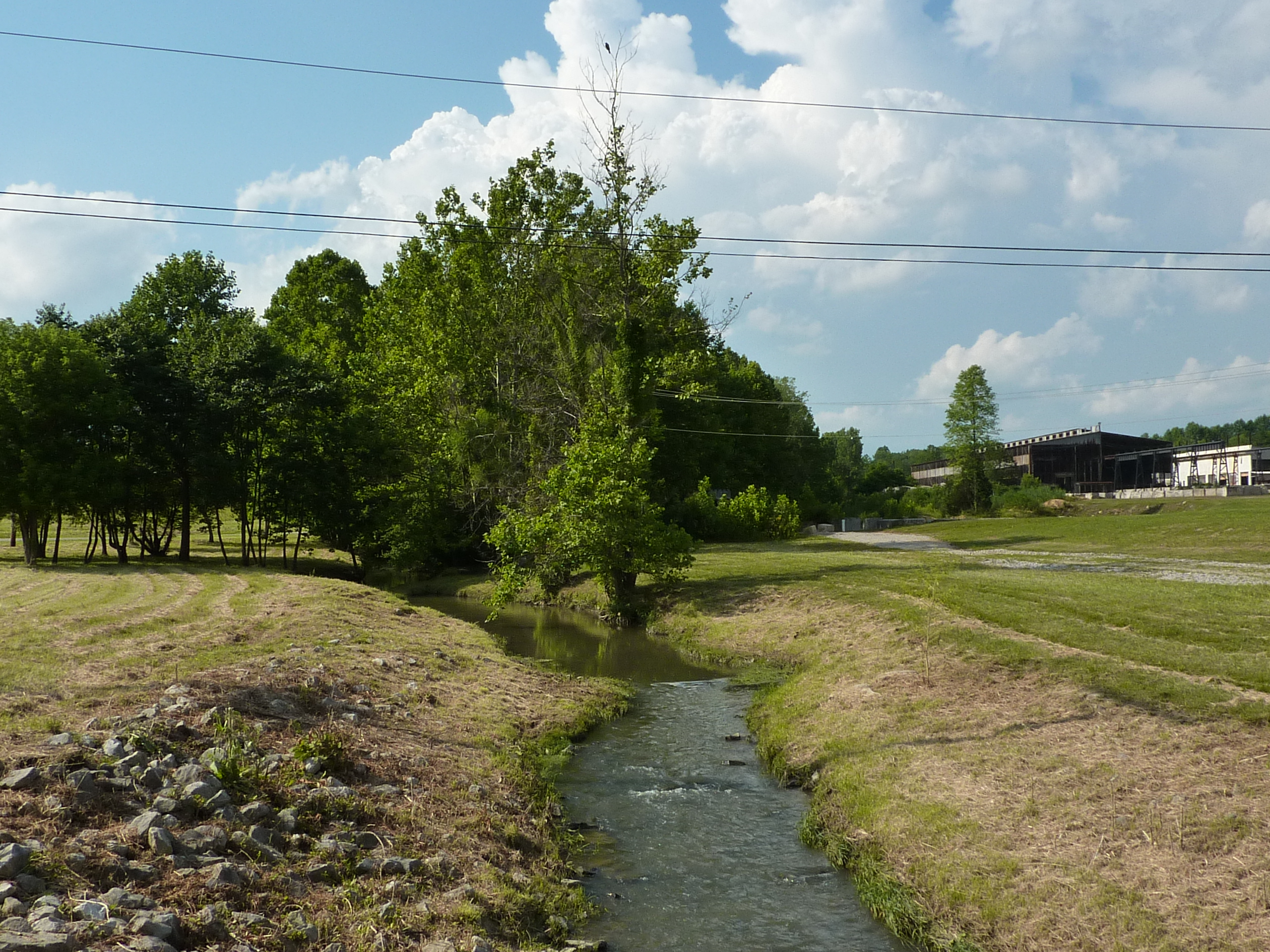
West Fork Clear Creek south of W. Tapp Rd

It is the West Fork Clear Creek and not the "main" Clear Creek, along which Bloomington's Clear Creek Trail runs. The trail following the "main" Clear Creek (along the former Monon Railroad route) is called the B-Line Trail (the northern, paved section) and the Bloomington Rail Trail (the southern, unpaved section). Bloomington Rail Trail crosses the West Fork Clear Creek over a 150-feet-long wrought-iron bridge, which was originally built in Warren County in 1887, and re-installed at its present location (39°6′30″N 86°32′35″W) on August 1, 2003.

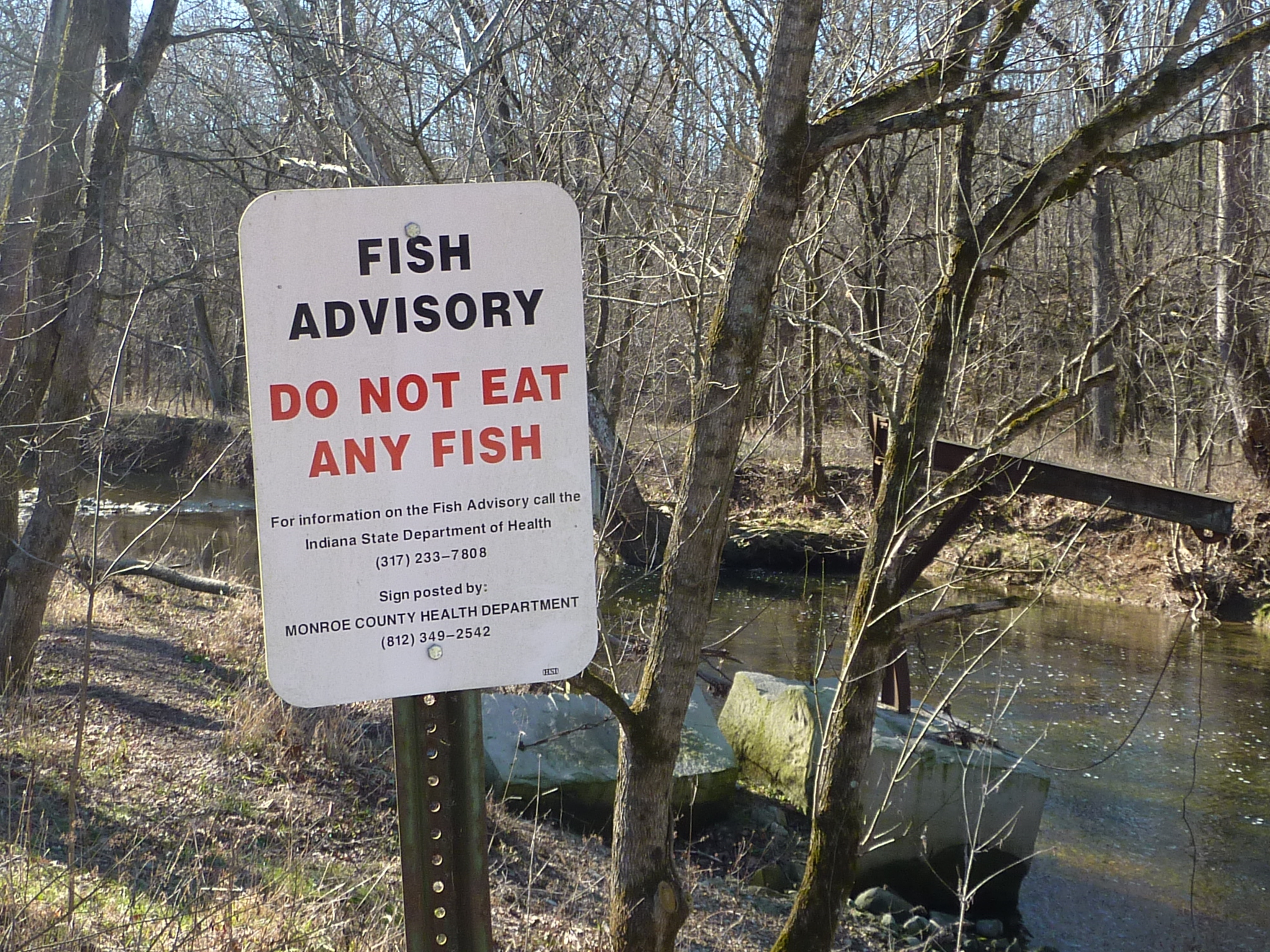
"Do not eat any fish", a sign by the creek downstream of Dillman Road Wastewater Treatment Plant

Sinking Creek does not flow into Clear Creek on the surface all the way; instead, it disappears in the ground in the karst terrain west of Bloomington, and its water then reappears in a number of springs in the area known as Leonard Springs and Shirley Springs. The Leonard Springs Reservoir existed in that area in 1915–1943.

== Water quality issues ==
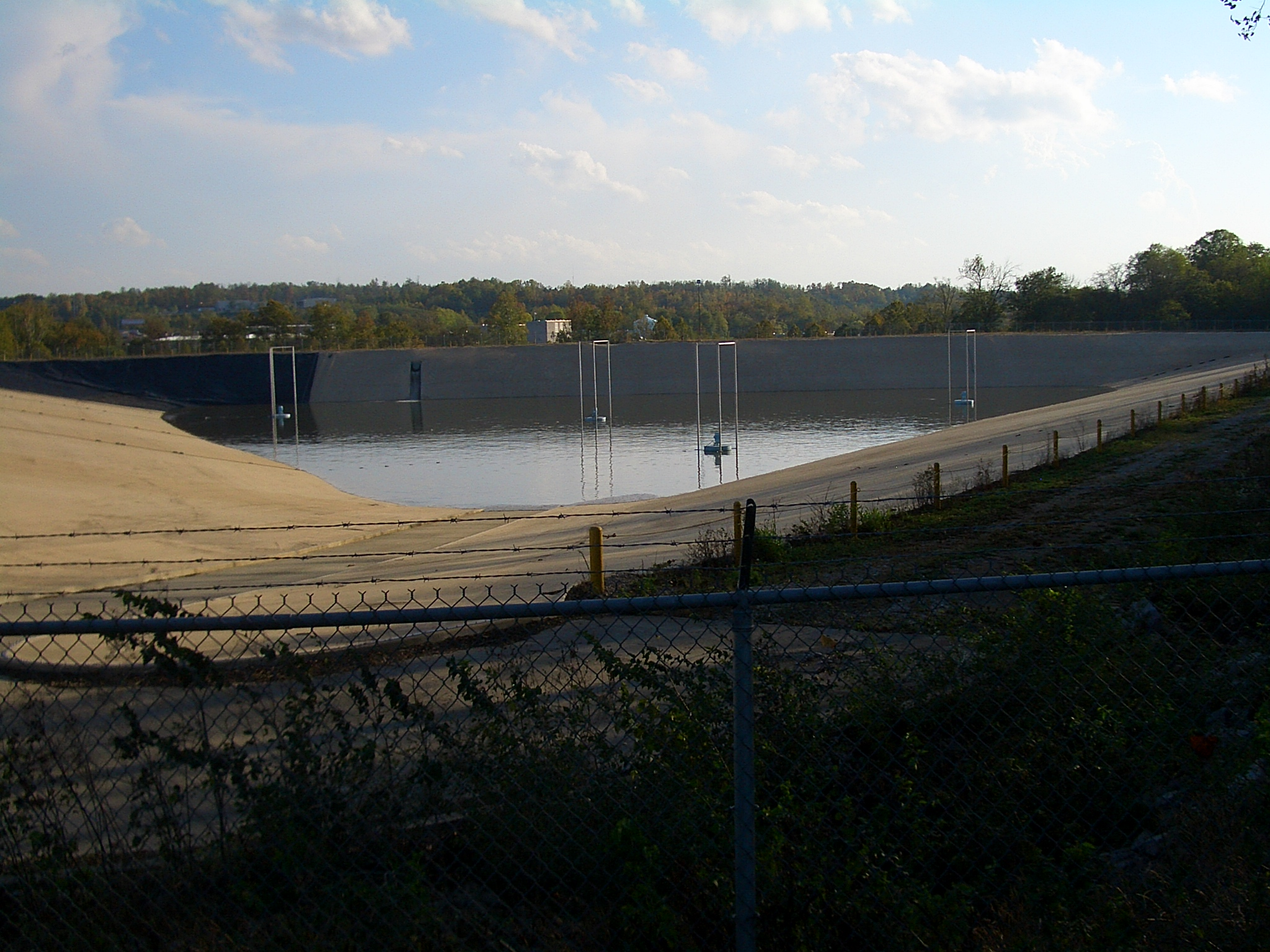
Dillman Road Wastewater Treatment Plant, a major source of water for the lower course of Clear Creek

Besides the street runoff from Bloomington, Clear Creek also receives the effluent from the city's Dillman Road Wastewater Treatment Plant.

After an outbreak of Legionnaires' disease in the Indiana Memorial Union in 1978, CDC bacteriologists discovered a new bacterial species in a sample of water taken from the "Jordan River" in front of the IMU. They named it Legionella jordanis after the river. Later, the bacterium was found at other sites in the country as well.

== See also ==
- List of rivers of Indiana
