= Griffy Lake =

- Griffy Reservoir
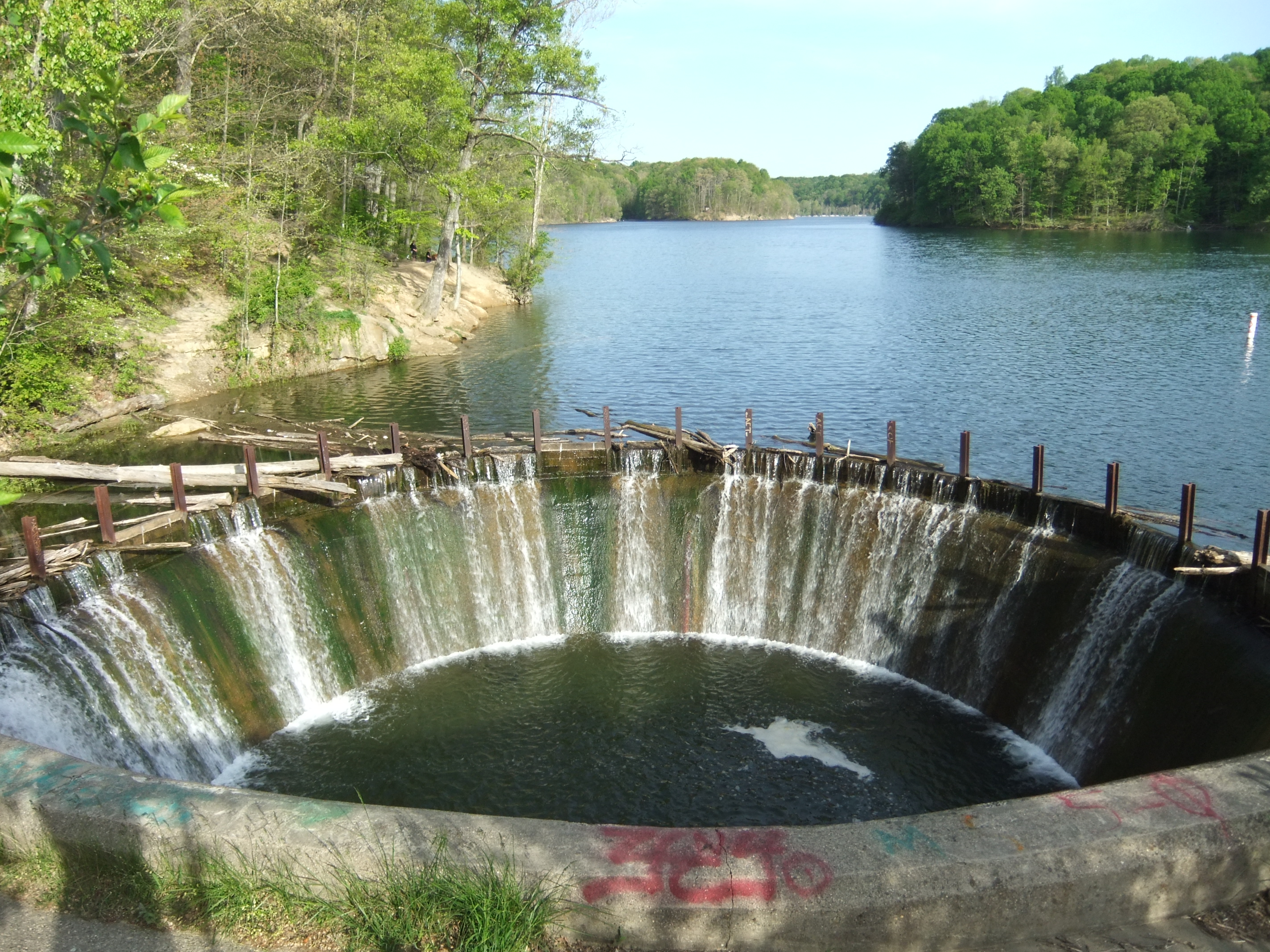
- The dam drain of Griffy Lake

- Location within Indiana Location within the United States
- Location: Bloomington, Monroe County, Indiana, United States
- Coordinates: 39°12′5.11″N 86°31′10.71″W
- Type: reservoir
- Primary inflows: Griffy Creek
- Primary outflows: Griffy Creek
- Basin countries: United States
- Surface area: 109 acres (44 ha)
- Water volume: 1,280 acre⋅ft (1.58 hm^{3})
- Surface elevation: 633 ft (193 m)
- Settlements: Bloomington

Griffy Reservoir, commonly known as Lake Griffy, is a reservoir in the city of Bloomington, Indiana. Created by a dam on Griffy Creek in the 1920s, the reservoir used to serve as the main source of drinking water for Bloomington for several decades, until that role was taken over by the larger Lake Lemon and Lake Monroe in the 1950s.

A large part of the lake's forested watershed is designated as the Griffy Lake Nature Preserve (GLNP). Another part of the watershed is included into Indiana University's Research and Teaching Preserve as its Griffy Woods section. Griffy Woods includes a smaller reservoir, known as the University Lake, which in a sense was a predecessor of Griffy Lake, and is part of the latter's watershed.

== History ==
=== Bloomington's early water projects ===
In the early 20th century, to satisfy the needs of the growing city and Indiana University, the city of Bloomington constructed a number of dams on various tributaries of Clear Creek southwest of town, creating a number of reservoirs: the Leonard Springs Reservoir, Wapehani Lake, Twin Lakes. However, due to the Mitchell Limestone subsoils in the area, these reservoirs continuously leaked water, making it impossible to reliably supply the city, and in particular the university, with the water they needed.

=== University Lake ===
Unable to receive the necessary amount of water from the city's leaky reservoirs, Indiana University's board of trustees in 1909 decided to undertake its own reservoir construction. University president William Lowe Bryan formed a committee led by geology professor E.R. Cumings, which on March 8, 1910, recommended a site for the new reservoir, which is now known as the University Lake. The E.R. Cumings' recommendation, the dam for the new reservoir was constructed over impervious Knobstone formations, blocking a ravine of a small tributary of Griffy Creek northeast of the IU campus. Griffy Creek is a tributary of Beanblossom Creek, which in its turn flows into the West Fork of Indiana's White River.

The 40' tall concrete arched dam of University Lake was constructed in several stages between 1910 and 1914.

=== Griffy Lake ===
In 1923, a few years after the university had itself with water from the Griffy Creek basin, Bloomington Water Company was created to construct a larger dam on Griffy Creek itself, downstream from the small University Lake. The Griffy Dam was constructed in 1924, forming the Griffy Reservoir (Griffy Lake). The 40' tall concrete arched dam was completed in 1924, thus creating the present-day Griffy Reservoir.

In 1934 Griffy Lake's water treatment plant and much of the adjacent territory passed into the city's ownership; the dam was expanded, now standing 44' tall (644' above the mean sea level). The dam is 900' long. Griffy Lake occupies 109 acres, and holds 1280 acre-feet of water.

As of 1984, the water treatment plant processed 7.5 million gallons of water per day.

Although since the 1950s the city receives drinking water from two larger reservoirs, Lake Lemon and (later) Lake Monroe, elsewhere in Monroe County, Griffy Lake is still considered as the potential "emergency" water supply source for the city. The water pumping station near the dam of Griffy Lake, decommissioned in 1995, stood until May 2020. Increased trespassing and mercury leaks from water treatment equipment demanded heightened security and eventually its demolition. Authorities ensure that all activities permitted within the Griffy Lake Nature Preserve are consistent with the potential use of the lake as a drinking water source. However, past outbreaks of toxic blue-green algae and pesticide runoff from the University Golf Course make the lake unsafe to swim.

In the summer of 2012 the lake was almost completely drained, in preparation for repairs to the dam. The repairs were finished on Nov 27, 2013, and the lake started refilling. A plan to restock the refilled lake with fish was announced in the early 2014.

== Griffy Lake Nature Preserve and Griffy Woods ==
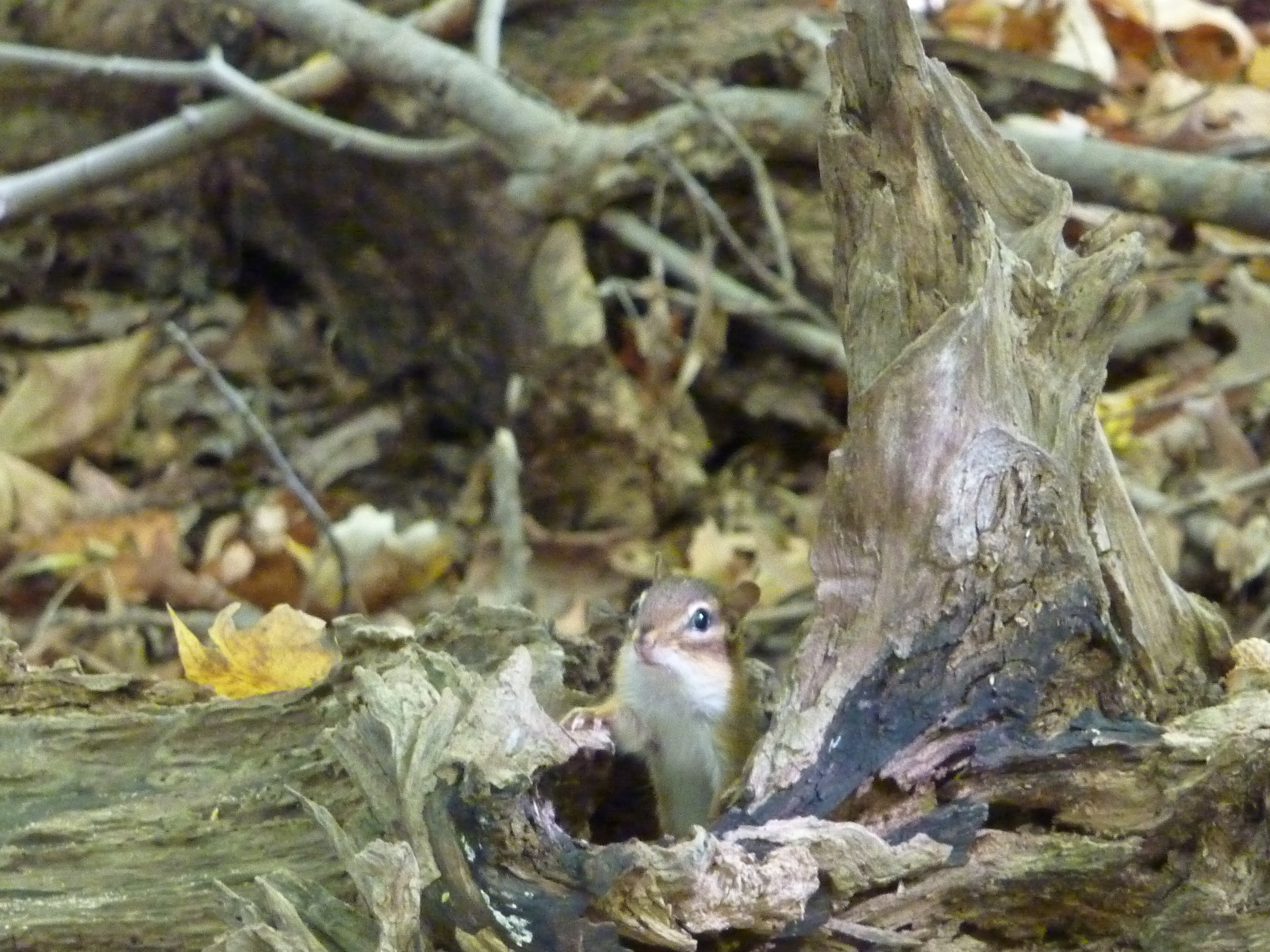
A chipmunk in the Griffy Woods

To protect Griffy Lake's water sources, over 45 separate parcels of property have been acquired over the years, creating the present-day 1,220 acre Griffy Lake Nature Preserve surrounding the lake.

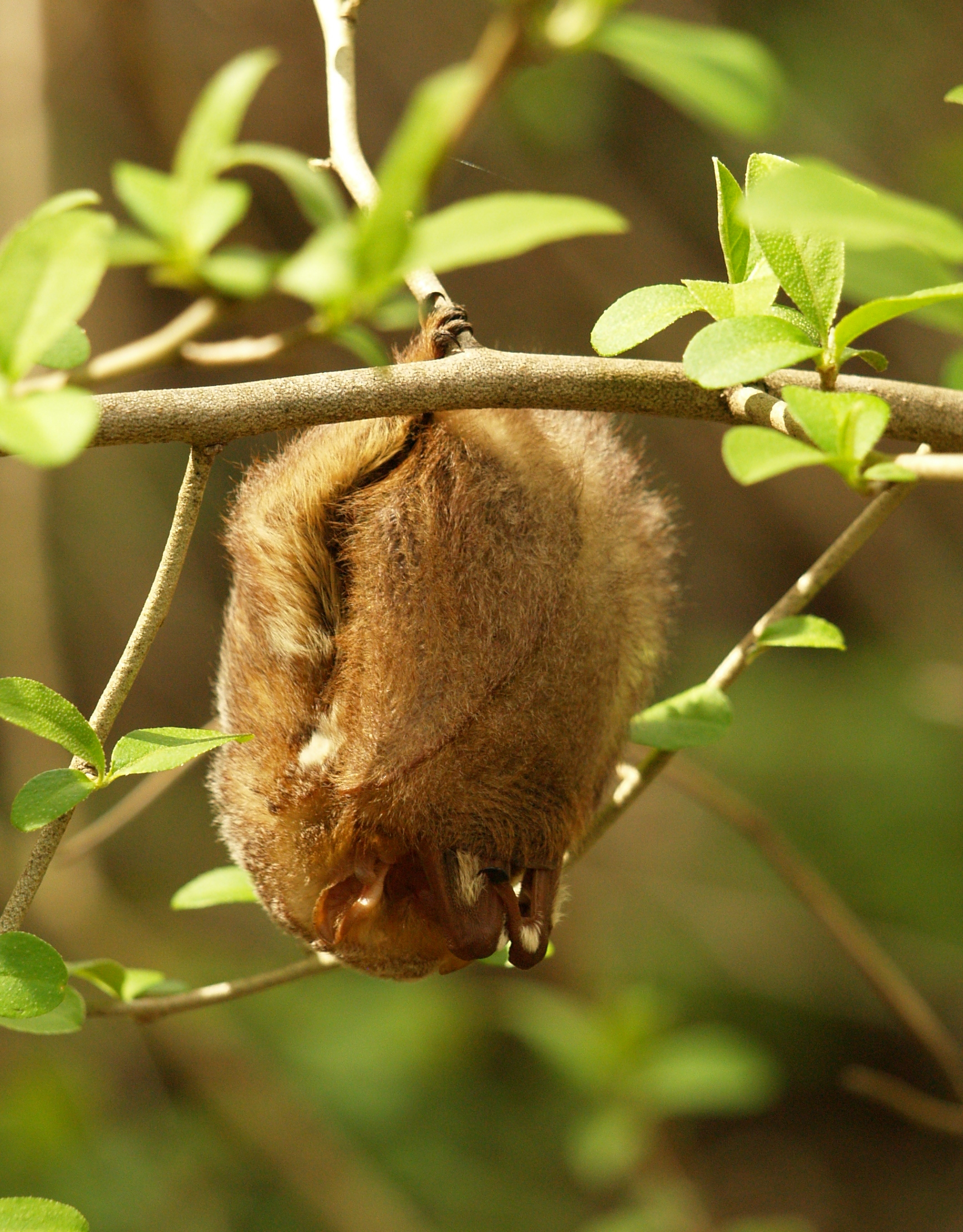
A nesting red bat

An adjacent area to the Griffy Lake Nature Preserve is the 185-acre Griffy Woods section of Indiana University Research and Teaching Preserve. Created in 2001, Griffy Woods occupies parts of the Griffy Lake watershed to the southeast of the lake, and includes University Lake.

Unlike Griffy Lake Nature Preserve, which is open to the public in its entirety, a large section of the Griffy Woods is presently closed to general public, and is supposed to be accessed only by the staff and students conducting environmental research in the area.

Beginning in late July 2021, the lake was temporarily lowered to conduct survey work for a new fishing pier and walkway on the western face of the Headley Road causeway. Construction began in the fall and continued into the summer of 2022. The walkway was opened to the public with a ribbon-cutting ceremony on July 29, 2022, which also celebrated 50 years of management by the Bloomington Parks and Recreation Department. The walkway now provides additional fishing spots and safer access to the north and south shore trails. BPRD plans to expand both trails into a loop encompassing a majority of the lake.

== Recreational use ==
The Griffy Lake Nature Preserve is one of the most popular nature areas within easy access from Bloomington and IU campus. There are hiking trails, boating facilities, and fishing.

In 2008, Bloomington pop-punk band Good Luck named their first studio album after the reservoir, entitled Into Lake Griffy.
