= Tashema Davis =

American artist and teacher

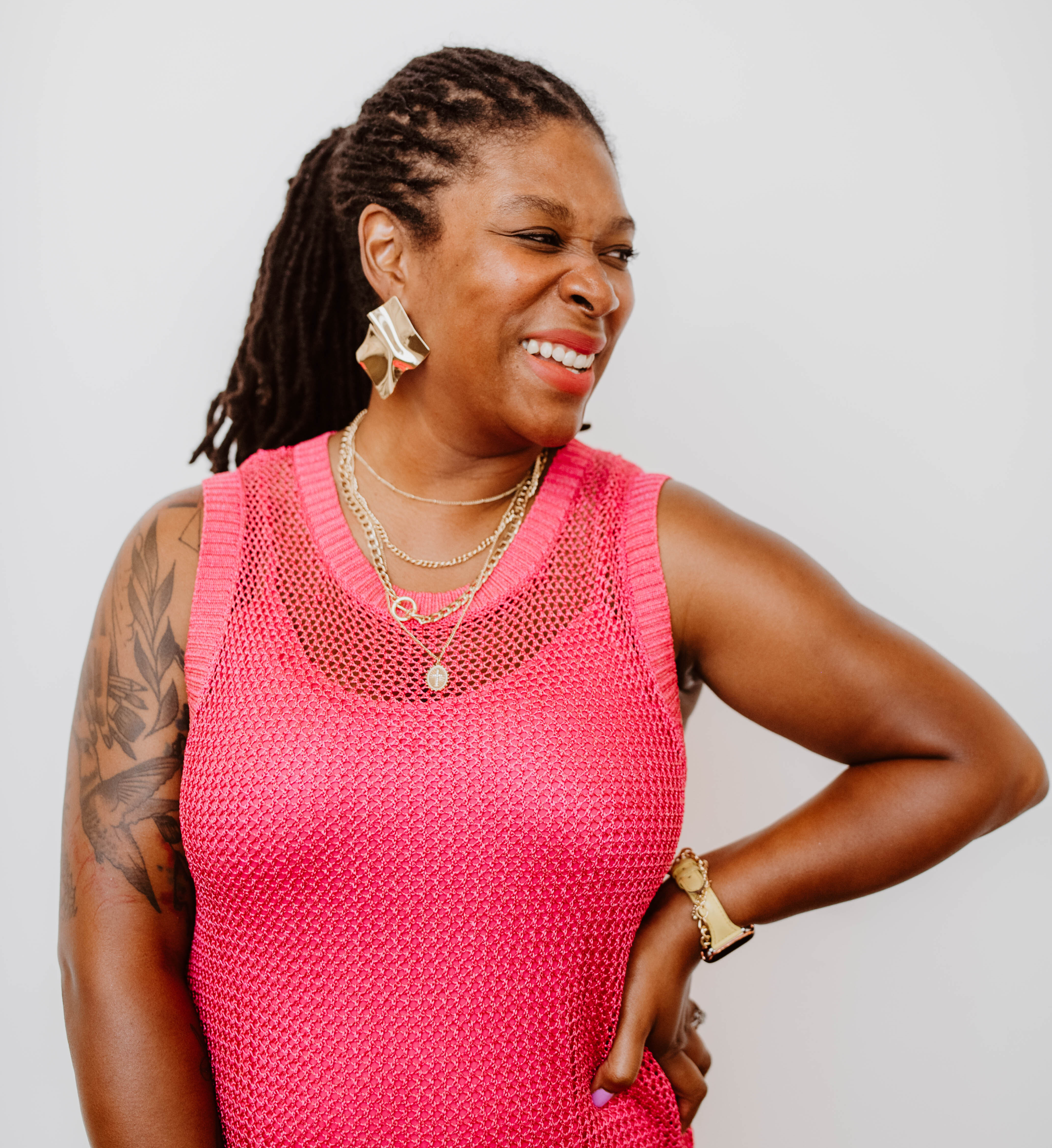
- Born: Gary, Indiana, US
- Education: Ball State University
- Known for: Painting
- Spouse: Keenan Davis
- Website: tnicole.com

Tashema Davis is an artist and art teacher based in Indiana, US. Her work, which consists of mostly brightly painted portraiture of Black women and men, has been featured in locations such as Indiana Wesleyan University's 1920 Gallery, the Harrison Center, the Huntington Arts and Entrepreneurial Center, the Kokomo Art Association's annual Black Pearls exhibit and the Indiana Memorial Union. Davis opened the Echo Galley in Marion, where she taught art classes to the public and displayed local artists' work. She has also worked as an art teacher at Marion High School in Marion, Indiana, and is the illustrator of several children's books.

== Early life and education ==
Davis was raised in the Gary, Indiana projects before leaving to attend college at Ball State University in Muncie, Indiana. At Ball State, Davis obtained a bachelor's degree in interior design while working as a substitute teacher at Marion Community Schools. During her time at Ball State as an undergraduate, Davis was encouraged to pursue painting by a professor named Scott Anderson. Davis later returned to Ball State for her master's degree in art and a license to teach, both of which she received in 2010.

== Career ==
Davis began teaching art classes at Marion High School in 2011. While working in this position, Davis also served as the sponsor of the Marion High School art club, an advisory board member for the art and writing scholastics of the Fort Wayne Museum of Art, and a children's book illustrator. By 2020, Davis had illustrated six children's books while working as a teacher. This branch of Davis's artistic career was originally inspired by stories that her oldest daughter had told to her younger sister. Davis took these stories and portrayed them in her first three illustrated books.

In 2020, Davis opened the Echo Gallery on Washington Street in Marion with funds provided to her after winning second place in Community Pitch Night. After moving her workspace out of the Boston Hill Center, the Echo Gallery acted as Davis's new studio. Davis also utilized the Echo Gallery as a space to display local artist's work, teach community members how to paint, and sell artwork, including several of her own illustrated children's books. Echo Gallery was closed in May 2024 after Davis made the decision to reallocate her time and efforts towards her family.

On September 4, 2020, Davis gave the first artist talk of the fall semester at Indiana Wesleyan University where she was presenting her artwork in the campus's 1920 Gallery. This show was titled 38 by Davis because thirty-eight was the age at which she decided she was an artist. This exhibit displayed many examples of Davis's brightly colored portraiture featuring Black subjects and self-portraits on canvas and tapestry.

In 2021, Davis was asked by Alex Husky, chancellor of Ivy Tech Community College, to curate a project that would be put on display at the Ivy Tech campus. For this project, Davis asked the public via social media who they believed qualified for the title of "Ma" which she defined a woman who led with strength and uplifted the community while "holding the door for the next generation". From the responses Davis chose 10 women who she would meet with and interview in order to curate their portraits in a manner that would best reflect their personalities. The paintings were put on display in February 2022 and the project was titled "Ma" as it was meant to celebrate the "Mas" of Marion and Grant County. The project was continued by Davis in an exhibit titled Ma. 2023, which opened on April 22, 2023, at the Marion Municipal Building.

In a collection of paintings titled The Hood, Davis explored the concept of the "Black man" in opposition of the stereotype she had seen in the media. This collection was shown in the Harrison Center in 2022 and the Pathfinder Arts and Entrepreneurial Center in 2023. Davis went on to have two more shows in the Harrison Center: Kefi (2023) and FINE (2024).

Davis's self-portrait, "In the Fog", was selected by Indiana University Bloomington students to be one of the four pieces bought by the university and added to their Indiana Memorial Union Collection. These students were sent in groups to the 2024 Butter Fine Arts Fair and tasked with searching for new artwork that would better reflect the diversity in the student body of IU Bloomington. Davis's "In the Fog", alongside Rosy Petri's "Yante", Justin A. Carney's "To Dance", and Rebekah Gaillard's "Unrequited", was given an unveiling ceremony in the IMU Federal Room on Tuesday, December 3, 2024. "In the Fog" was placed in the Indiana Memorial Unions' Tree Suites Lounge.

== Works ==
Davis has self-published several of her own illustrated books and collaborated with many self-publishing authors as an illustrator on their literary works.

=== Illustrated books ===
- When We Grow Up (2020) – with Cawanna King
- I Miss Poppy (2021) – with Denise S Millben
- I Am A Gift (2021) – with Shayona J. Funches
- A Christmas Miracle (2022) – with Angela Monique Parks
- Mammau's Bags (2022) – with Denise S Millben
- Childlike Faith (2023) – with Alanna Myers
- Amiyah's Shenanigans (2024)
- Imagineers (2024)
- Brown Beauty (2024)
- Everywhere I am: An illustration of God's Omnipresence (2024)

=== Coloring books ===
- Color Me Beautiful (2017)
- King Me (2017)
- Imagineers Coloring Book (2024)

=== Exhibition catalogs ===
- Ma. 2022 (2023)
- Ma. 2023: Shine a Light on 'em! (2023)
- FINE (2025)
