= B-Line Trail =

Urban project in Bloomington, Indiana

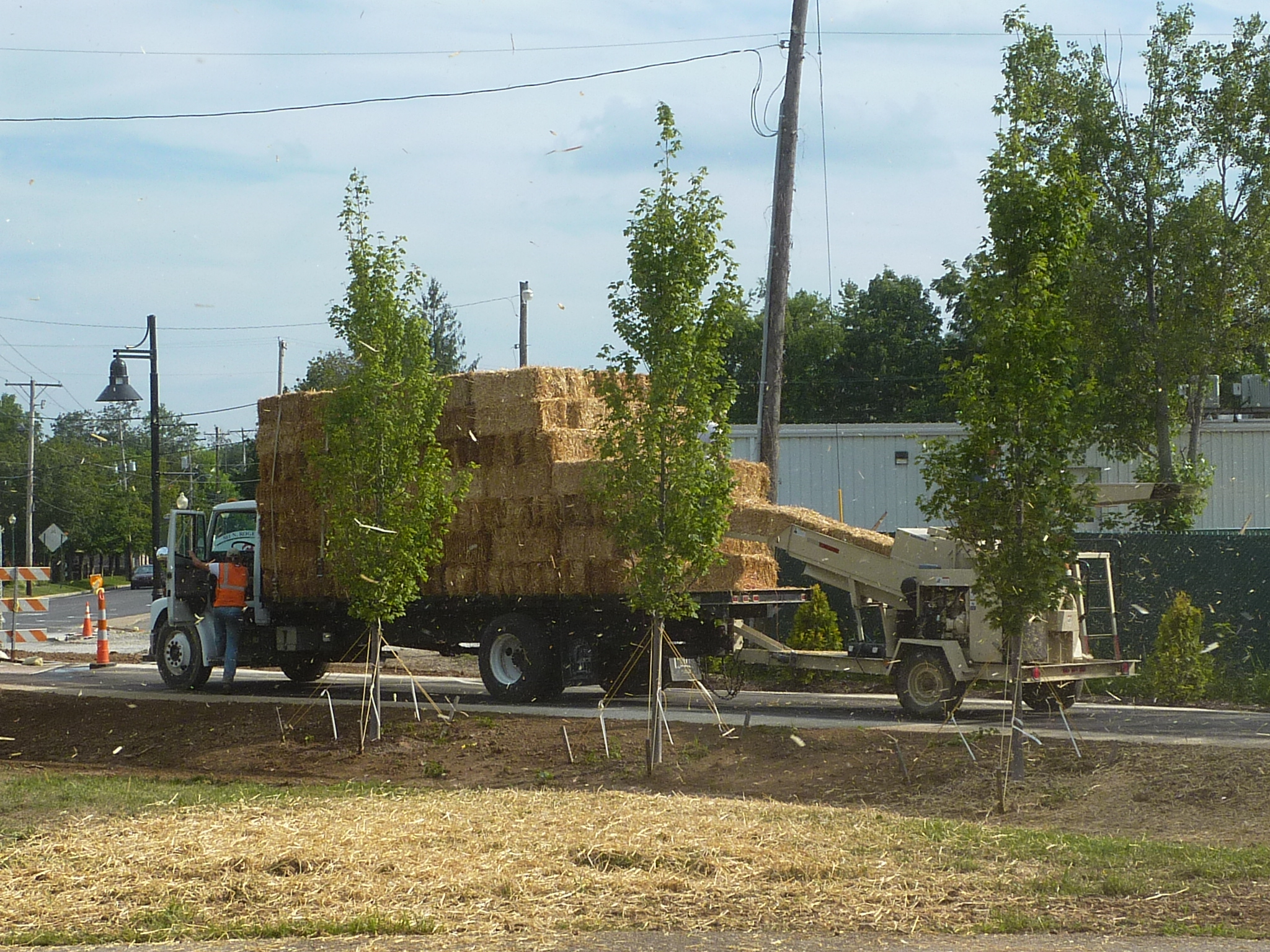
- A work crew spreading straw along the B-Line Trail
- Length: 3.1 miles (5.0 km)
- Location: Bloomington, Indiana
- Use: Multi-use path
- Surface: Asphalt

The B-Line Trail is a multi-use trail in Bloomington, Indiana, connecting the city's downtown to outlying neighborhoods. Multiple plazas are located along the trail, as well as numerous works of public art, such as murals and sculptures. The trail's route includes Switchyard Park, a linear park constructed on the site of the former McDoel Switchyard. The trail connects with the Bloomington Rail Trail at Country Club Drive, which in turn connects to the Clear Creek Trail.

The trail runs along the route of the Monon Railroad through Bloomington, which was abandoned by CSX in 1994 and bought by the city of Bloomington in 2004. Due to extensive soil contamination, the Environmental Protection Agency has awarded Bloomington numerous grants for environmental remediation and cleanup along the trail corridor.

A monument to Captain Janeway, a character from the television show Star Trek: Voyager was placed on the trail next to the WonderLab Museum in 2020.

Plans have been made to extend the trail north of its current terminus on Adams Street to connect with the existing multi-use path on 17th Street.

== See also ==
- Clear Creek
- Limestone Greenway
