= Stephens Creek =

Stephens Creek can refer to:

- Stephens Creek (New South Wales), Australia
  - Stephens Creek Dam, a reservoir on the creek
- Stephens Creek (Indiana), United States
- Stephens Creek (Oregon), United States

== See also ==
- Stevens Creek (disambiguation)
