= WonderLab =

Science museum in Bloomington, Indiana, US

Coordinates: 39°9′57″N 86°32′11″W

WonderLab Museum of Science, Health and Technology
- Established: 1995
- Location: Bloomington, Indiana
- Type: Science Museum
- Visitors: 80,000
- Website: Official website

The WonderLab Museum of Science, Health & Technology is a science museum located in the city of Bloomington, Indiana, United States. It was incorporated in 1995 as a private 501(c)(3) non-profit organization. WonderLab is a member of the Association of Science-Technology Centers.

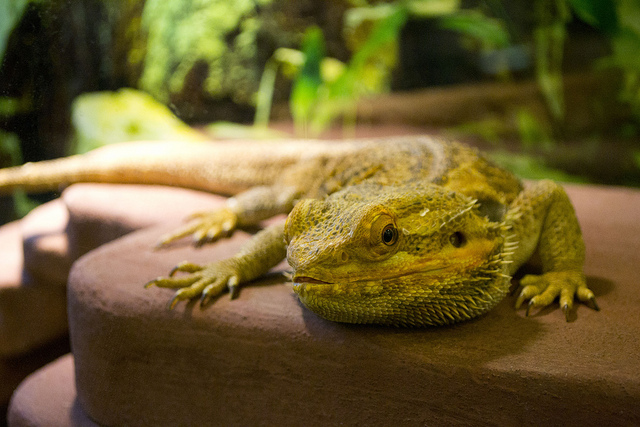
The WonderLab Bearded Dragon

== History ==
WonderLab began operation as a traveling outreach program of volunteers led by Deb Kent, a Bloomington-based magazine writer and mother of two, and Catherine Olmer, a physics professor at Indiana University. In 1998, WonderLab opened a small, interim museum on the north side of the Bloomington courthouse square. At the same time, a capital campaign was launched to build a permanent museum on a downtown lot donated by the city of Bloomington. The current 15,000-square-foot (1,400 m^{2}) museum opened to the public on March 29, 2003. Currently, WonderLab is in the heart of the Bloomington Entertainment and Arts District (BEAD) and is a visitor attraction on the B-Line Trail.

== Inside the Museum ==
WonderLab is an accessible facility with two floors of hands-on science exhibits. Several exhibits are permanent, while others are rotated off and on throughout the year. Some of the highlights are listed below:

=== First Floor ===
A popular exhibit on the first floor is the Grapevine Climber, which allows visitors to climb up giant leaves to view the museum from a different perspective. The Bubble-Airium offers multiple exhibits that showcase unexpected ways of forming and using bubbles. The Lego Water Table allows children to dam and divert water flowing down a large lego sheet. The first floor is also home to the Discovery Garden, an enclosed area with age-appropriate science activities for toddlers and preschoolers.

=== Second Floor ===
The second floor is home to many of the live animal exhibits at WonderLab, as well as exhibits about southern Indiana's geologic past as interpreted through fossils. In addition, the floor features exhibits relating to health, the human body and the science of sound.

== Lester P. Bushnell WonderGarden ==
WonderLab's WonderGarden is a small nature area set between the museum building and the B-Line Trail. The garden includes a selection of outdoor science exhibits and an amphitheater for science programs. Museum visitors may check out nature packs at the welcome desk to use for exploring the science of the garden in different seasons.

== Other Educational Activities ==
WonderLab presents science programs for all ages, conducts a summer science camp, is a partner in the MCCSC after-school enrichment program, provides outreach services, and offers professional development workshops for teachers. In addition, the museum provides work experiences for Indiana University college students, summer internships for high school students, and a variety of volunteer opportunities for hundreds of teens and adults.

== Selected awards ==
- Certified Wildlife Habitat (WonderGarden) — certified by the National Wildlife Federation in 2009
- Best Place to Volunteer — awarded by the Indiana Daily Student in 2009
- Top 25 Hands-On Science Center in the United States — ranked #17 by Parents (September 2008 issue)
- Community Enhancement Award — awarded by the Greater Bloomington Chamber of Commerce in 2003
- Attraction of the Year — awarded by the Bloomington/Monroe County Convention and Visitors Bureau in 2003

== See also ==
- List of museums in Indiana
- List of children's museums in the United States
