= Sycamore Land Trust =

Non-profit land trust based in Indiana

Sycamore Land Trust Service Area

Sycamore Land Trust is a 501(c)(3) non-profit member-supported land trust headquartered in Bloomington, Indiana, United States.

It works to preserve the disappearing natural and agricultural landscape of southern Indiana. Sycamore's service area includes 26 southern Indiana counties: Bartholomew, Brown, Clark, Crawford, Dubois, Daviess, Floyd, Gibson, Greene, Harrison, Jackson, Knox, Lawrence, Martin, Monroe, Morgan, Orange, Owen, Perry, Pike, Posey, Scott, Spencer, Vanderburgh, Warrick, and Washington.

The trust is an affiliate of the American Land Trust Alliance. In 2023, the trust has 7 full-time staff and over 100 volunteers.

== Conservation successes ==
Since its founding in 1990, Sycamore has protected more than 9,000 acres of land on 100 parcels. Sycamore protects land by owning nature preserves, and by holding permanent conservation easements on privately owned land. Properties span fifteen Indiana counties, including Bartholomew, Brown, Crawford, Gibson, Greene, Harrison, Knox, Lawrence, Martin, Monroe, Morgan, Orange, Owen, Pike, and Vanderburgh Counties. Many of the properties that Sycamore owns outright have hiking trails and are open to the general public.

In September 2012, in its largest land protection project to date, Sycamore Land Trust acquired 1,043-acre tract adjoining the Patoka River National Wildlife Refuge and Management Area, one of three national wildlife refuges in Indiana. The property features forested wetlands, upland forests, and planted prairies which provide habitat for several threatened species such as the Indiana bat, bobcat, river otter, and copperbelly watersnake.

In August 2012, Sycamore partnered with Capriole Farm in Greenville, Indiana, to permanently protect the historic farmstead that gave rise to the internationally recognized Capriole Goat Cheese. Capriole is now the last working dairy farm in Floyd County. Earlier that summer, Sycamore acquired its first property in Vanderburgh County, Eagle Slough Natural Area. Due to its landscape of wetlands and bottomland forest, Eagle Slough provides an excellent habitat for more than 150 different species of birds. The property is also home to some of the largest bald cypress trees in the state of Indiana.

== Nature preserves ==
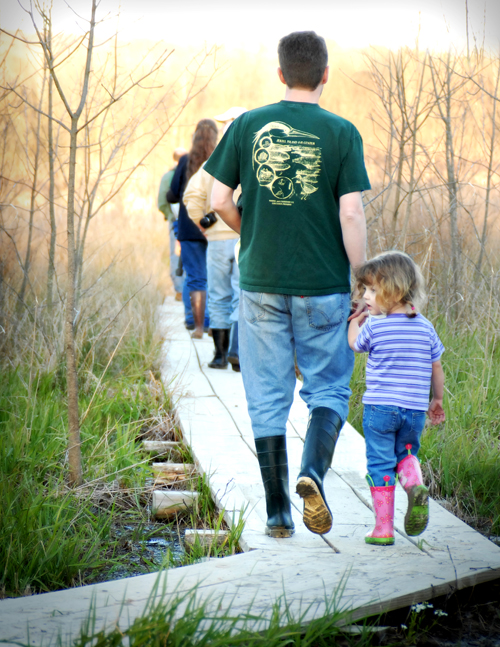
Beanblossom Bottoms Preserve. Photo by Joni James.

Place markers on the Sycamore preserve map indicate preserves that are accessible to the general public for hiking and exploring. Other preserves may not be accessible to the public because of limited road access and parking.

The most accessible Sycamore properties include Beanblossom Bottoms Nature Preserve and the Amy Weingartner Branigin Peninsula Preserve in Monroe County, the Cedars Preserve in southern Monroe County, Columbia Mine Preserve in Gibson and Pike Counties, Eagle Slough Natural Area in Evansville, IN, the Jeremy K. Oakley Preserve in northeastern Lawrence County, the Laura Hare Nature Preserve at Downey Hill, Bob Klawitter Lake Lemon Woods in northeastern Monroe County, Porter West Preserve in western Monroe County, Powell Preserve in northwest Monroe County, Scarlet Oak Woods in central Monroe County, Tangeman Woods in western Bartholomew County, Touch the Earth in central Bartholomew County, and Canyon Forest Nature Preserve in northeastern Greene County.

== Environmental Education Program ==
Sycamore has an active and award-winning Environmental Education Program that helps people in southern Indiana build an understanding of Indiana's natural heritage and the Earth's delicately balanced living systems. Sycamore believes that nature is the ultimate educator and offers lessons that reinforce school curriculum as well as program for families and the community.

The Environmental Education program focuses on three approaches: individual teachers and classes; larger scale projects; and cooperative projects. Through classroom work, Sycamore leads outdoor discovery activities, hiking, exploring, math or science lessons, and reflective writing. Larger projects include a watershed study project on Beanblossom Creek and cooperative field days that create a dynamic learning environment. In 2023, the Environmental Education plans to work with 6,000 people.

== Awards ==
In 2007 Sycamore received a National Arbor Day Award in the Project category for planting over 50,000 trees throughout southern Indiana. Also in 2007 Sycamore received an Indiana Achievement Award in the Impact category for excellence in land protection and restoration, and environmental education. In 2009 Sycamore's Environmental Education Program was again honored, receiving the Governor's Award in the Outreach or Education category. In 2010, Indiana Governor Mitch Daniels proclaimed the week of February 22–28 Sycamore Land Trust Week.

== Media coverage ==
- "Benefits of the trust: Bicentennial Nature Trust’s $30 million helps agencies acquire thousands of acres across Indiana" - The Herald-Times
- "With Invasives, Ounce of Protection is Worth a Pound of Cure" - Earth Eats, Indiana Public Media
- Sycamore Land Trust opens new preserve on Lake Monroe
- Environmental education program will come to school districts around Indiana this fall – Indiana Daily Student
- "Frogs, Rails, and Eagles Oh My!" - Adventure Indiana

== See also ==
- Vicky J. Meretsky
- List of environmental and conservation organizations in the United States
