= Salt Creek (White River tributary) =

Stream in the South Indiana, U.S.

Coordinates: 38°49′42″N 86°32′53″W

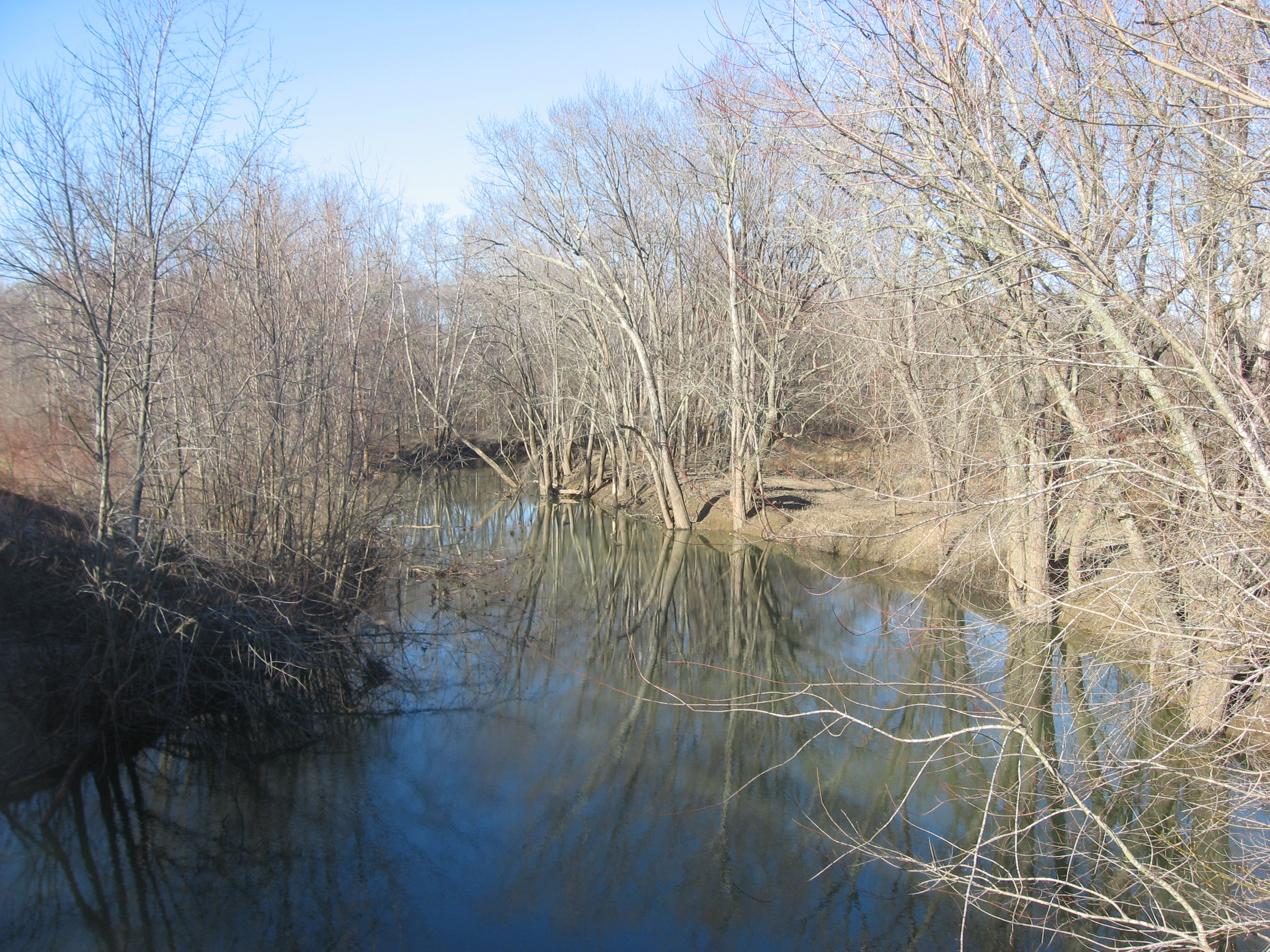
Salt Creek above Monroe Lake

Satellite view of Monroe Lake

Salt Creek is a stream in the southern part of the U.S. state of Indiana. A tributary of the East Fork of the White River, the creek begins in southwestern Bartholomew County, flows through southern parts of Brown and Monroe counties, and meets the White River just downstream from Bedford in Lawrence County. In far southwestern Brown County and much of southern Monroe County, the creek flows through Monroe Lake, which was created by damming the creek in 1965.

A major tributary of Salt Creek is Clear Creek, which drains most of the city of Bloomington. Besides the street runoff from Bloomington, Clear Creek also brings with it the effluent from the city's Dillman Road Wastewater Treatment Plant. Stephens Creek, which drains a portion of eastern Monroe County, is another tributary.

Salt Creek, according to data collected from the years 1956–2001 at the USGS station at Harrodsburg, Indiana, has a mean annual discharge of 495 cubic feet per second.

Salt Creek was so named on account of the many brine springs along its course.

== See also ==
- List of rivers of Indiana
