= Harrodsburg, Indiana =

- Census-designated place
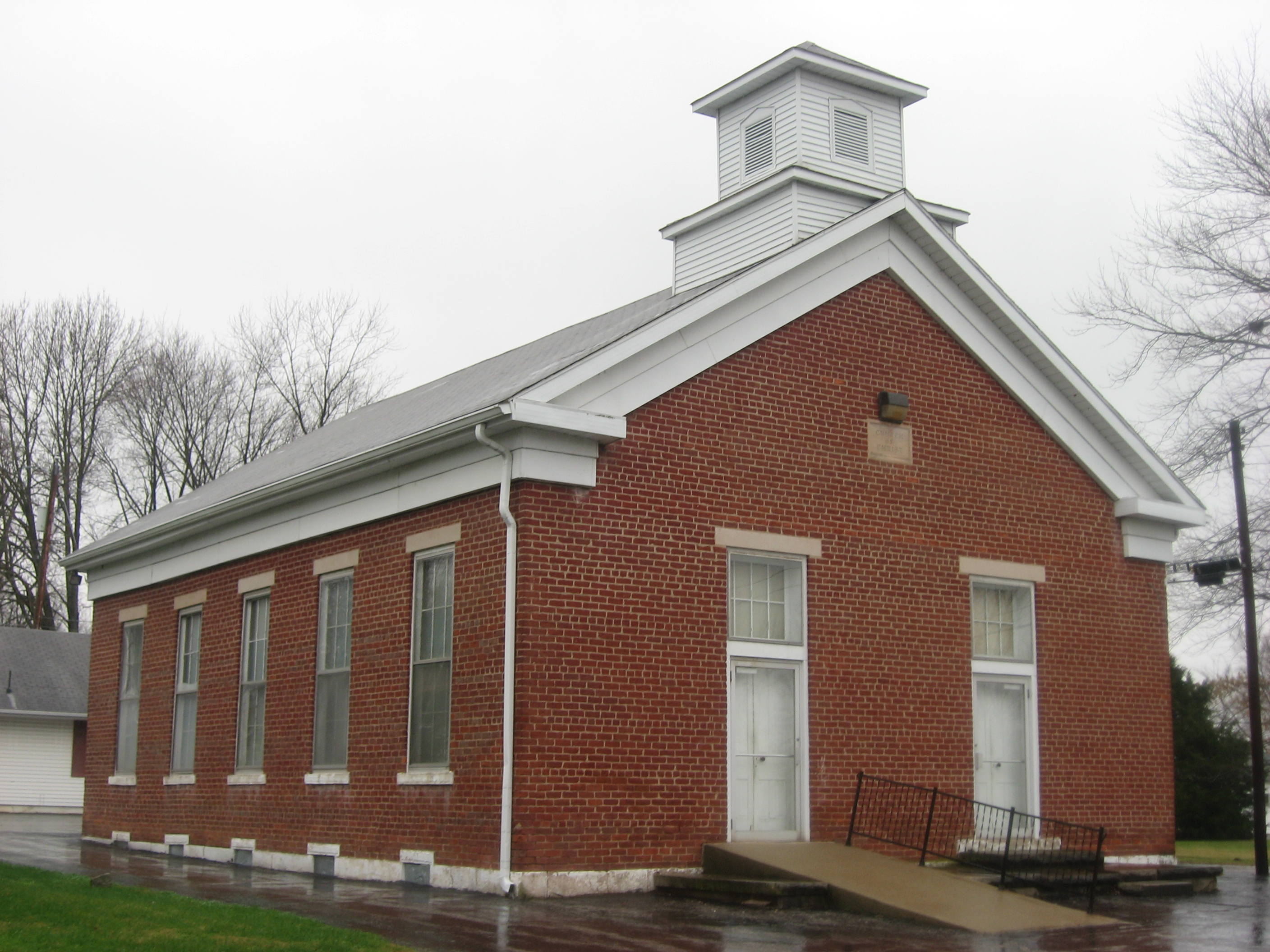
- Harrodsburg Church of Christ

- Location in Monroe County, Indiana

- Location in the United States
- Coordinates: 39°00′48″N 86°33′42″W
- Country: United States
- State: Indiana
- County: Monroe
- Township: Clear Creek

Area
  - Total: 4.35 sq mi (11.27 km^{2})
  - Land: 4.31 sq mi (11.17 km^{2})
  - Water: 0.035 sq mi (0.09 km^{2})
- Elevation: 627 ft (191 m)

Population (2020)
  - Total: 656
  - Density: 152.1/sq mi (58.71/km^{2})
- Time zone: UTC-5 (Eastern (EST))
  - Summer (DST): UTC-4 (EDT)
- ZIP codes: 47434, 47403 (Bloomington), 47462 (Springville)
- Area codes: 812, 930
- FIPS code: 18-32170
- GNIS feature ID: 2583454
- Website: cdm16066.contentdm.oclc.org/cdm/search/collection/p15078coll32/searchterm/Harrodsburg/order/nosort

Harrodsburg is an unincorporated community and census-designated place (CDP) in Clear Creek Township, Monroe County, in the U.S. state of Indiana. Its population was 656 at the 2020 census.

== History ==
Harrodsburg was originally known as "Newgene", and under the latter name was platted in 1836. The post office at Harrodsburg has been in operation since 1840.

== Geography ==
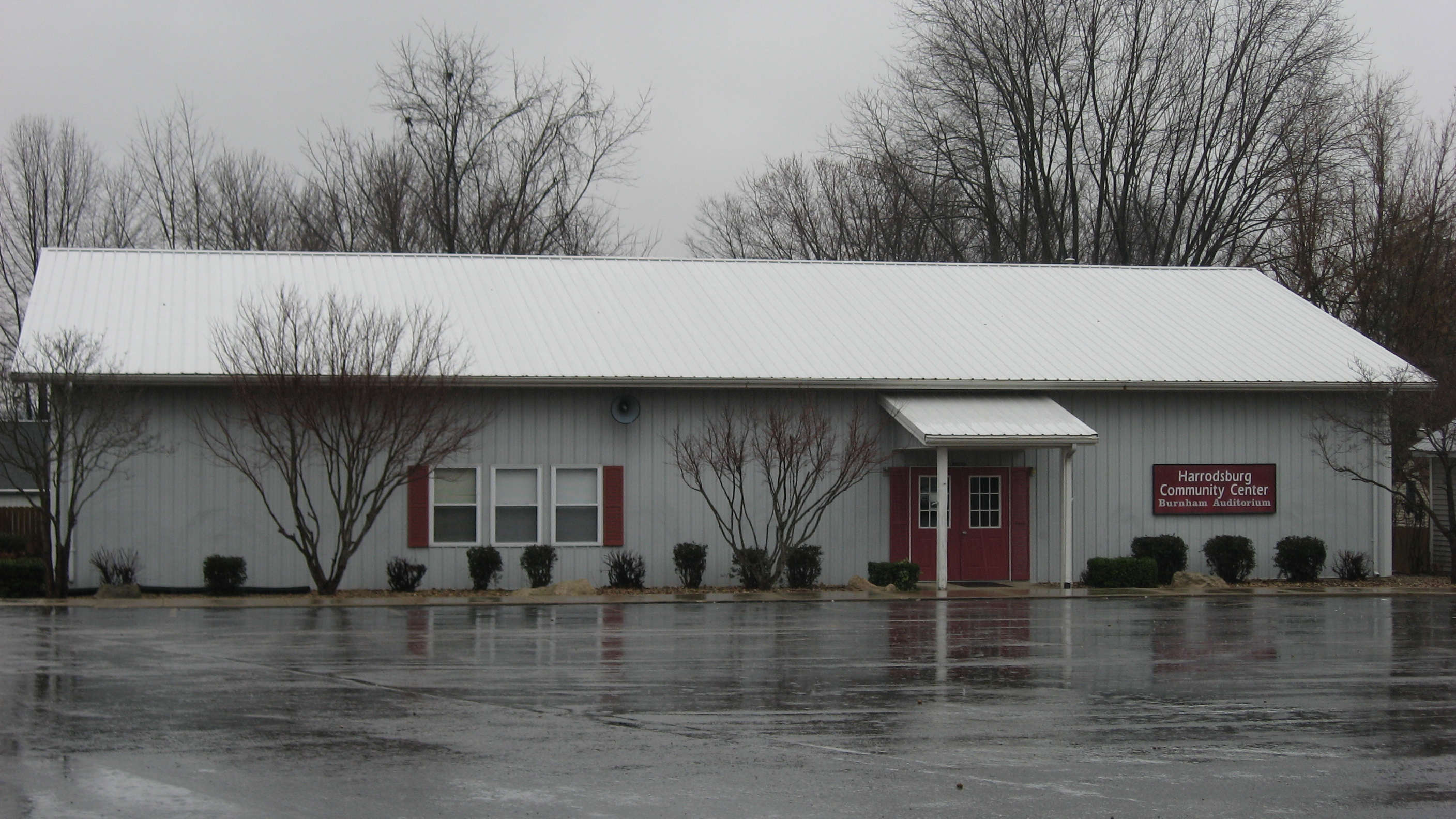
Harrodsburg Community Center, 1002 W. Popcorn Road

Harrodsburg is located in southern Monroe County. It is bordered to the east by Indiana State Road 37, which leads north 12 miles (19 km) to Bloomington, the county seat, and south 12 miles (19 km) to Bedford.

According to the U.S. Census Bureau, the Harrodsburg CDP has a total area of 4.35 square miles (11.27 km^{2}), of which 0.04 square miles (0.10 km^{2}), or 0.83%, are water. The town is drained by Clear Creek, a southeast-flowing tributary of Salt Creek, which continues south to the East Fork of the White River near Bedford.

== Harrodsburg Community Center ==
The Harrodsburg Community Building, built in 1992, is a central site for community events and public meetings. It also serves as a polling place for the Clear Creek 3 precinct. Funds to maintain the center are raised in part from the annual Heritage Days Festival.

== Attractions and community events ==
Harrodsburg Heritage Days Festival is a free-admission event held annually in May.

From 1981 to 2013, the Harrodsburg Haunted House was a popular attraction in Monroe County, running weekends throughout October. Clear Creek Township Trustee Thelma Kelley Jeffries attributed the closing to increasing "government and state permits and laws" required for operation.

== Demographics ==
Historical population
Census	Pop.	Note	%±
2010	691		—
2020	656		−5.1%
U.S. Decennial Census
