= Rebekah Gaillard =

American photographer

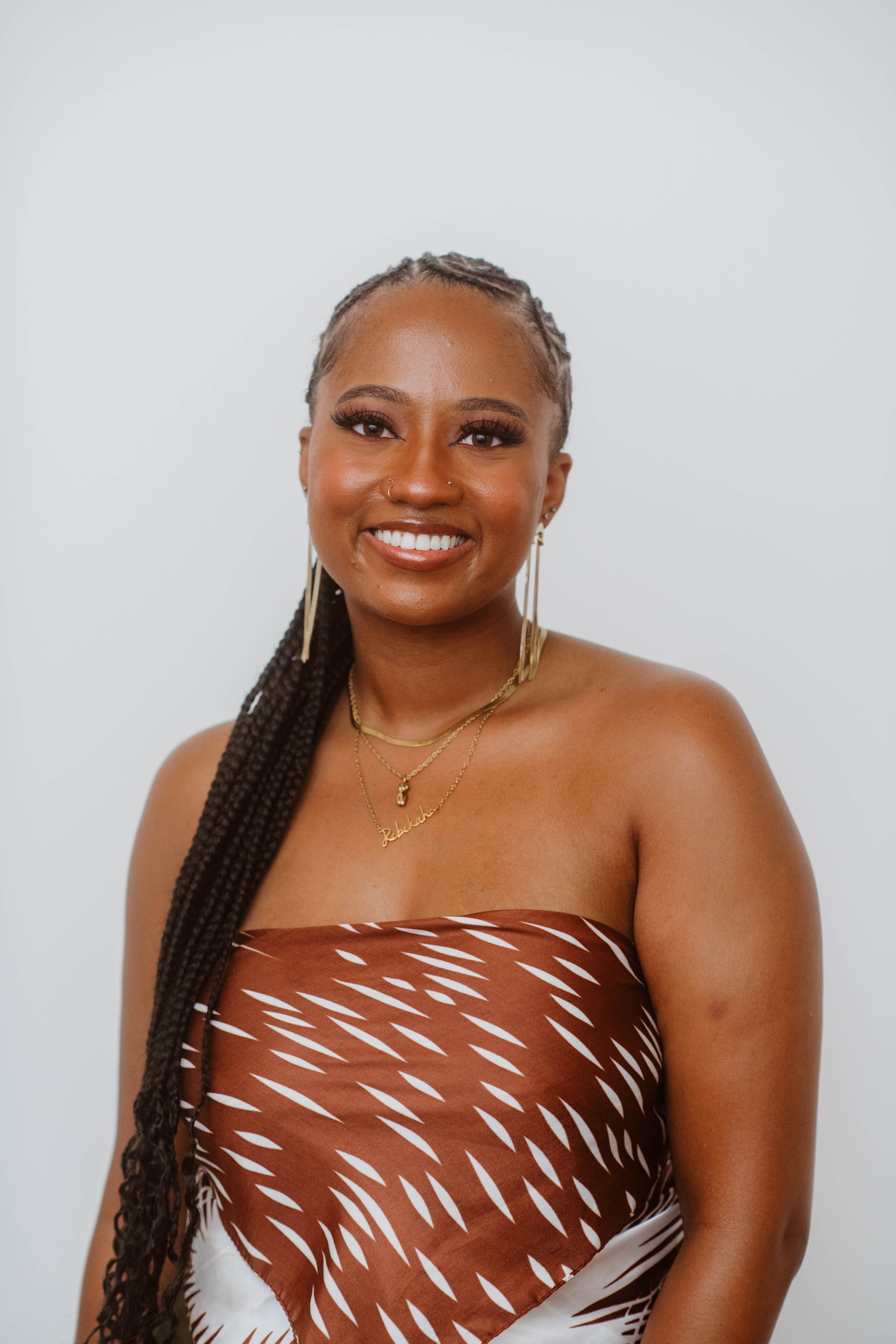
- Born: Brooklyn, New York
- Notable work: "Unrequited"
- Style: Photography
- Awards: Black Women Photographers X Nikon
- Website: https://rebekahgaillard.com/

Rebekah Gaillard is a fine art photographer and creative director who has been based in Indianapolis, Indiana and Los Angeles, California. She has published a coffee table book titled "A Note to Self" and co-developed an art show in Los Angeles that highlighted an all-woman group of new artists. Gaillard's own photographs have been featured in The Michael O’Brien Gallery Phoenix, the BUTTER Fine Art Fair, and the Indiana Memorial Union. Her artwork is inspired by fashion, movies, music, and her own cultural background as a Black immigrant.

== Career ==
Gaillard was born in Port-au-Prince, Haiti. She was raised in Indianapolis, Indiana and Brooklyn, New York. She picked up photography as a hobby in high school before committing to it as a business and form of artistry years later.

In 2019, after recently starting to curate her own photography shoots, Gaillard and Shadé Bell co-founded the "Blooming Art Show" in Los Angeles. The "Blooming Art Show" was started with the intention of highlighting an all-female of color group of artists and musicians. At the time Gaillard was also acting CEO of her own photography company, Noisette Visuals.

Gaillard's first solo gallery show was titled "Teardrops on My Lens Again" and it was held in August 2023 at The Michael O’Brien Gallery Phoenix in Indianapolis. In this exhibition, Gaillard incorporated themes such as love, rebirth and growth in an attempt to reflect her own personal experiences.

In 2024, Gaillard relocated her business from Indianapolis to Los Angeles, however, she still participated in that year's BUTTER Fine Arts Fair in Indianapolis. Indiana University Bloomington students attended the 2024 BUTTER Fine Arts Fair in order to pick four pieces to be displayed in the campus's Indiana Memorial Union that would reflect their student body's diversity. Gaillard's piece "Unrequited" was chosen by the students. The four pieces had their unveiling ceremony in the IMU Federal Room on Tuesday, December 3, 2024.

== Awards ==
- Black Women Photographers X Nikon Grant 2024
