= Stevens Creek =

Stevens Creek can refer to:

In Canada:

- Stevens Creek (Ontario), a tributary of the Rideau River

In the United States:

- Stevens Creek (California), a tributary of San Francisco Bay
- Stevens Creek (Illinois), a tributary of the Sangamon River
- Stevens Creek, Virginia, a community in Grayson County

== See also ==
- Stephens Creek (disambiguation)
