= Land Trust Alliance =

US non-profit organization

- Logo of the Land Trust Alliance.
- Abbreviation: LTA
- Predecessor: Land Trust Exchange
- Formation: February 22, 1982; 44 years ago
- Legal status: Organization
- Purpose: Nature conservation
- Headquarters: Washington, D.C.
- Coordinates: 38.899580°N 77.029120°W
- Members: 950 (2021-2022)
- Interim CEO & President and Chief Program Officer: Jennifer Miller Herzog
- Board of directors: Michael A. Polemis (chair)
- Staff: 60
- Website: landtrustalliance.org

Land Trust Alliance is a nature conservation organization, based in Washington, D.C. The Alliance represents many land trusts across the United States.

== History ==
Originally formed as the Land Trust Exchange in Boston on February 22, 1982, Allan Spader was named its inaugural director. In 1990, the name of the organization was changed to the Land Trust Alliance and was moved to Washington, D.C.

The Land Trust Alliance has sponsored "Rally," a yearly conference of conservation professionals, since 1985.

In 2012, the Land Trust Alliance set up an insurance company to assist regional land trusts with the legal defense of conservation easements.

In 2021, the Land Trust Alliance expressed support for the 117th United States Congress' proposed "Charitable Conservation Easement Program Integrity Act", which is intended to prevent improper tax deductions for land trusts and encourage legitimate charitable contributions.

== See also ==
- Sycamore Land Trust
