= Beanblossom Creek =

Stream in Monroe and Brown County, Indiana, U.S.

Coordinates: 39°19′49″N 86°39′31″W

Beanblossom Creek is a stream in Monroe and Brown counties, Indiana, in the United States. The creek drains roughly 91.97 square miles into the two counties of south central Indiana.

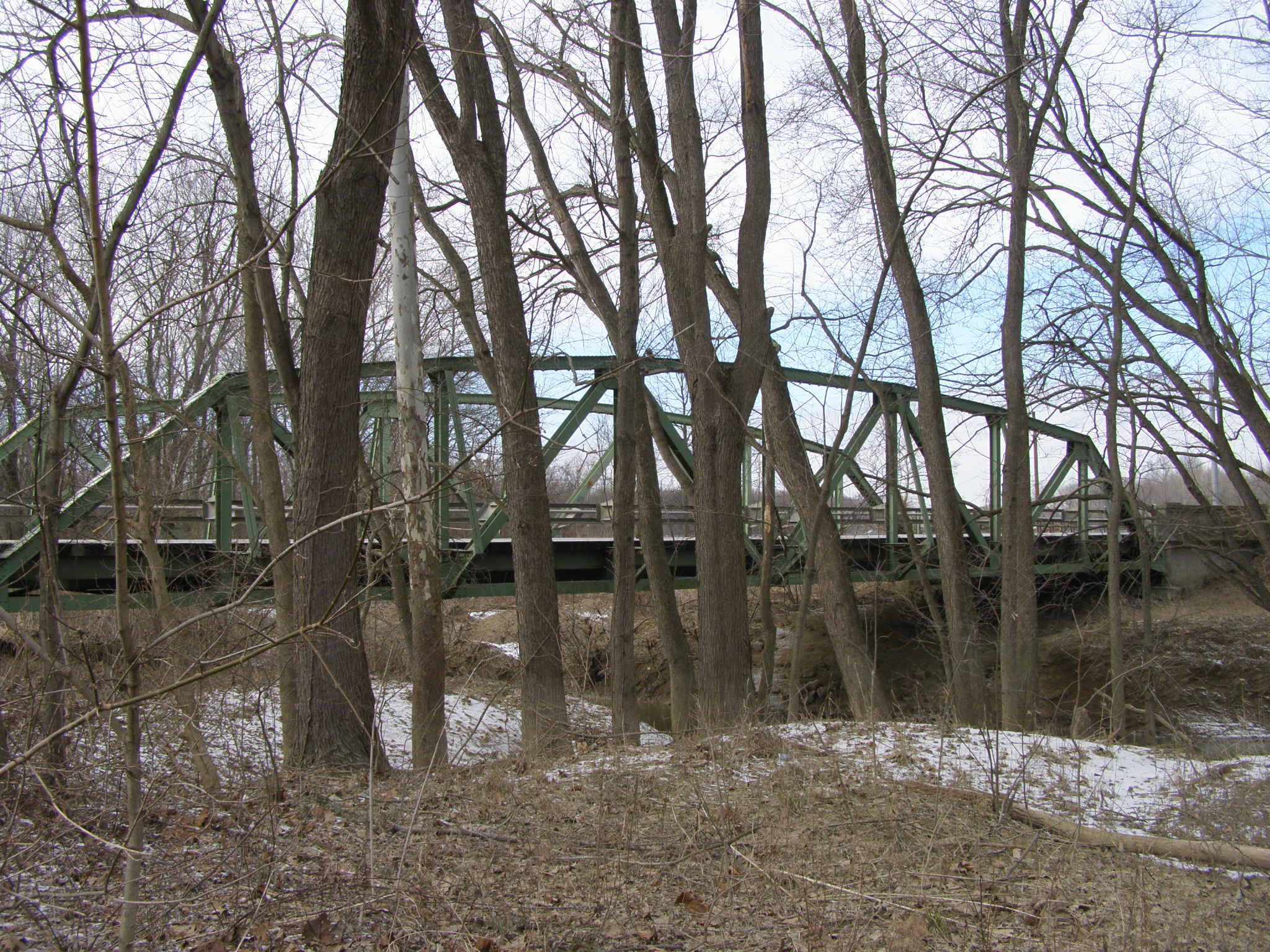
P1290073 Bloomington Pony Truss

== History ==
Beanblossom Creek was named for a pioneer named Beanblossom, who almost drowned when swimming across the swollen creek.

A dam was constructed on Beanblossom Creek in the 1950s, forming Lake Lemon. Earlier, a smaller Griffy Lake has been created by a dam impounding Griffy Creek, one of Beanblossom Creek's tributaries.

== Pollution ==
From September to October 2001, the Indiana Department of Environmental Management conducted a comprehensive survey of the Beanblossom Creek Watershed. Escherichia coli bacteria (E. coli bacteria) was found to be the primary impairment, as well as 15 other pollutants. The E. coli bacteria was declared to have come from a variety of sources, including but not limited to animal agriculture, urban and rural runoff, home sewage treatment, and sewer overflow. The Total Maximum Daily Load (TMDL) report for the Beanblossom Creek Watershed was approved by the Environmental Protection Agency on April 2, 2006. Solutions, including manure management and storm water controls, were proposed in the report.

== Conservation ==
To commemorate the state of Indiana's 200th anniversary in 2016, then-governor Mitch Daniels started the Bicentennial Nature Trust. The state program, a $30 million trust for to buy land for conservation purposes, allocated $1 million for land in northern Monroe county around Beanblossom Creek. The trust established the Beanblossom Creek Bicentennial Conservation Area, protecting the Beanblossom Bottoms Nature Preserve, the Lake Griffy Nature Preserve, and a section of the Morgan-Monroe state forest in the hopes of improving water quality and other conservation goals.

== Covered Bridge Fire ==
In 1976, a fire destroyed the historic Cedar Ford Covered Bridge over Beanblossom Creek, which dated back to the 1880s. The bridge was the only one of its kind in all of Monroe County. Reconstruction started in the fall of 2018 and finished 2019.

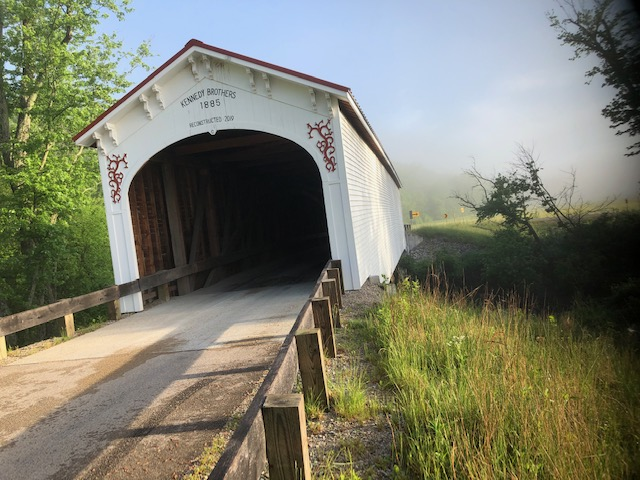
Beanblossum Bottom Covered Bridge of 2019 Rebuild

The $1.6 million project is 80% funded by the Federal government. 30% of the lumber for the reconstruction comes from another Indiana covered bridge, Cedar Ford Bridge of Shelby, which was erected in 1885 and taken down in 1975.

== See also ==
- List of rivers of Indiana
- Sycamore Land Trust
