= Bloomington Rail Trail =

Trail in Bloomington, Indiana

- Length: 1.8 miles (2.9 km)
- Location: Bloomington, Indiana
- Use: Multi-use path
- Surface: Gravel

The Bloomington Rail Trail is a multi-use trail in Bloomington, Indiana. It connects with the B-Line Trail at a trailhead on Country Club Drive and the Clear Creek Trail at a trailhead near Church Lane.

There were plans to construct a paved trail on an adjacent corridor parallel to the Rail Trail, but plans were scrapped in 1996 after neighboring landowners sued Monroe County to prevent construction.
