= Limestone Greenway =

Multi-use trail in Monroe County, Indiana

- Length: 1.8 miles (2.9 km)
- Location: Bloomington, Indiana
- Use: Multi-use path
- Surface: Asphalt

The Limestone Greenway is a multi-use trail in Monroe County, Indiana. It begins south of Church Lane, directly connecting to the Clear Creek Trail, and ends close by to Victor Pike, on land used as mitigation for the construction of I-69.

The trail was built at a cost of $1,030,554 million, and opened in July 2019. It uses an abandoned rail corridor formerly owned by the Illinois Central Railway, which was acquired by Monroe County as part of a land swap with the city of Bloomington, Indiana.

There were originally plans to build a trail called the Limestone County Trail on the abandoned rail corridor, but plans were scrapped in 1996 after multiple neighboring landowners sued Monroe County to prevent construction and reclaim ownership of the railbed.
