= Stephens Creek (Indiana) =

Location
- Country: United States
- State: Indiana
- County: Monroe

Physical characteristics
- Mouth
  - location: North Fork Salt Creek
  - coordinates: 39°08′46″N 86°24′09″W

Basin features
- Progression: South-east
- Tributaries
  - left: East Branch Jackson Creek, East Fork Jackson Creek and West Branch Jackson Creek

Stephens Creek is a creek in Monroe County, Indiana that drains portions of Benton and Salt Creek Townships. Stephens Creek flows in the general south-eastern and southern direction and is a tributary of North Fork Salt Creek.

Stephens Creek originates in an area bounded by State Road 45 on the west and north and Mt. Gilead Road on the east. It passes under State Road 46 approximately 0.2 miles west of North Gettys Creek Road. It then passes under South Friendship Road before discharging into North Fork Salt Creek.

== Tributaries ==
Stephens Creek's main tributary is Kerr Creek, which primarily flows along East Kerr Creek Road before discharging into Stephens Creek just north of State Road 46.

== See also ==
- List of rivers of Indiana
