= Lake Lemon =

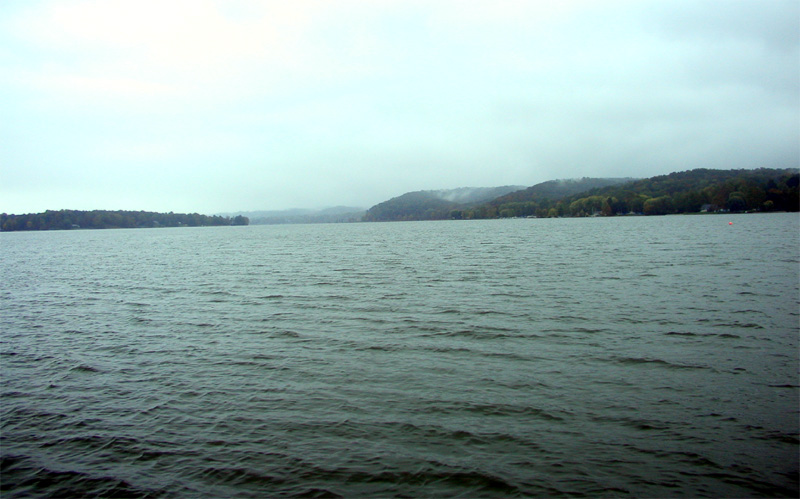
- 2002

- Location within Indiana Location within the United States
- Location: Monroe / Brown counties, Indiana, United States
- Coordinates: 39°15′27″N 86°23′47″W
- Type: reservoir
- Primary inflows: Bean Blossom Creek
- Primary outflows: Bean Blossom Creek
- Basin countries: United States
- Surface area: 1,650 acres (670 ha)
- Average depth: 9.7 ft (3.0 m)
- Max. depth: 20 ft (6.1 m)
- Surface elevation: 630 ft (192 m)

Lake Lemon aerial view

Lake Lemon is a reservoir located in southern Indiana approximately 10 miles (16 km) northeast of Bloomington, Indiana. It is bounded by private and public property in Monroe County and Brown County, with the eastern end of the lake in Brown County. The surface area of the lake is 1,650 acres (670 ha), making it the 11th largest lake in Indiana. There are 24 miles (39 km) of shoreline. The lake has an average depth of 9.7 feet (3.0 m) at full pool level. The greatest depth is somewhat in excess of 20 feet (6.1 m), matching with the original Bean Blossom Creek bed.

== Construction ==
Damming of Bean Blossom Creek and construction of Lake Lemon began in 1953 with the intent to create a primary water source for nearby Bloomington, as well as a recreation area and flood control project for Bean Blossom Creek.

Lake Lemon Dam is an earthen dam 51 feet (16 m) in height, 660 feet (200 m) in length at its crest, and a maximum capacity of 45,700 acre-feet (56,400,000 m^{3}). Construction was completed by 1956. Lake Lemon remained a primary water source for Bloomington until being replaced in the 1970s by Lake Monroe, a considerably larger man-made reservoir to the south. Lake Lemon still serves as a back-up water source for Bloomington.

The Indiana Rail Road's Shuffle Creek Trestle is located on the south side of the lake. It is the location of a July 2014 incident that nearly resulted in the deaths of two trespassers.

== Management ==
By the 1990s, the City of Bloomington Utilities department, which operated the lake, began looking for an alternative group to manage the lake. This was due in large part to financial pressures on that department's budget. A group of landowners around Lake Lemon formed the Lake Lemon Conservancy District to take over operation of the lake, and official operation of the lake was handed over to this group in 1995. In 2002, the City of Bloomington handed over operation of Riddle Point Park (located on the lake) to the conservancy district as well.

== Fauna and flora ==
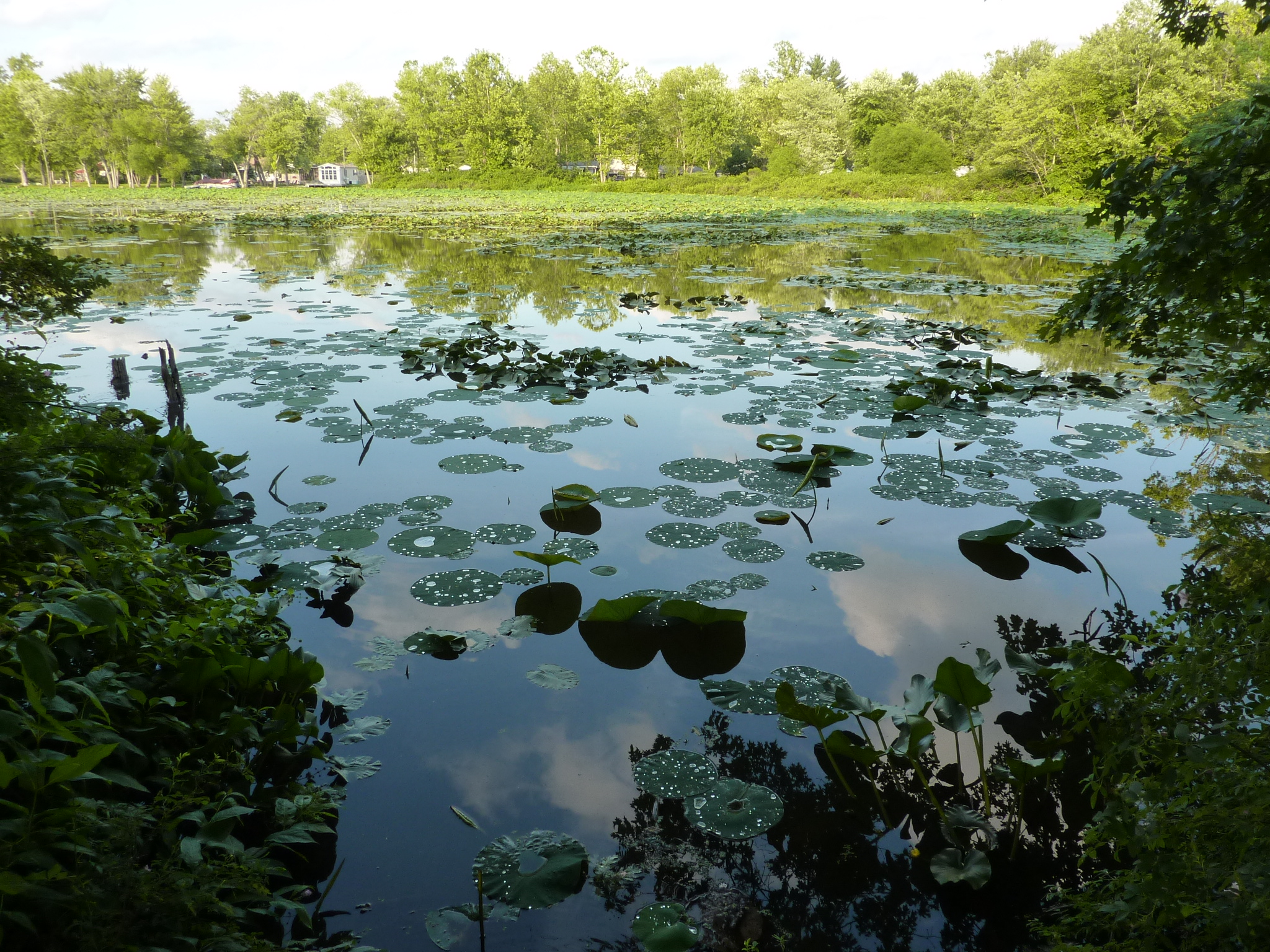
American lotus off the Little Africa

The lake is home to two dozen varieties of fish (including largemouth bass, crappie, catfish, and bluegill); wildlife (including beaver and muskrat); and birds (including bald eagle, heron, and egret). Since 1985, the Indiana Department of Natural Resources has released 73 bald eagle chicks at nearby Lake Monroe, resulting in an increasing number of sightings of this species at Lake Lemon.

A very wide range of plants and trees find comfortable habitat on the lands immediately surrounding the lake. The most abundant plants include American lotus, cattail, and spatterdock. Tree varieties include silver maple and oak, both in abundance.

As of 2005, zebra mussels, an invasive species, have not been observed in the lake.

== Parks and other facilities ==
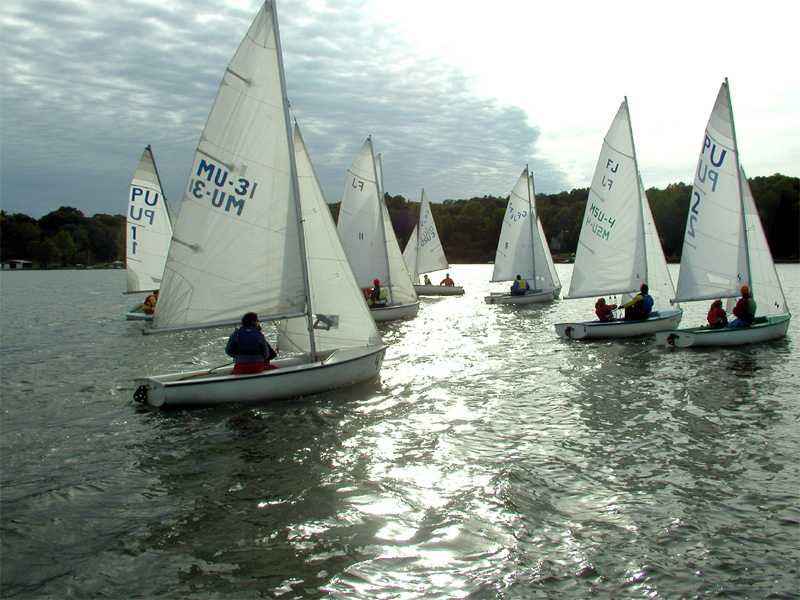
Flying Juniors compete in a collegiate regatta on Lake Lemon

There are two publicly accessible parks located on the lake. The largest is Riddle Point Park operated by the Lake Lemon Conservancy district. This park features a boat ramp, a 1 acre (0.40 ha) native prairie grass demonstration area, a beach, a shelter house, and a nature trail. The other park is Little Africa Wildlife Viewing Area (39°15′9″N 86°21′52″W), which covers 24 acres (9.7 ha) on a peninsula at the east end of the lake and features a nature trail.

Lake Lemon Marina is the only marina on the lake. It is located on the north shore of the lake and offers the only publicly available boat fuel on the lake. A private yacht club called Bloomington Yacht Club exists on the south shore of the lake.

Also on the south shore of the lake is the Indiana University Aquatic Center. This center hosts a number of activities including sailing, rowing, and water skiing. The facility is home to the Indiana University Women's Rowing Team, Indiana University Club Rowing Team, and Indiana University Sailing Club.
