= Indiana Memorial Union =

Coordinates: 39°10′4″N 86°31′25″W

Indiana University Memorial Union
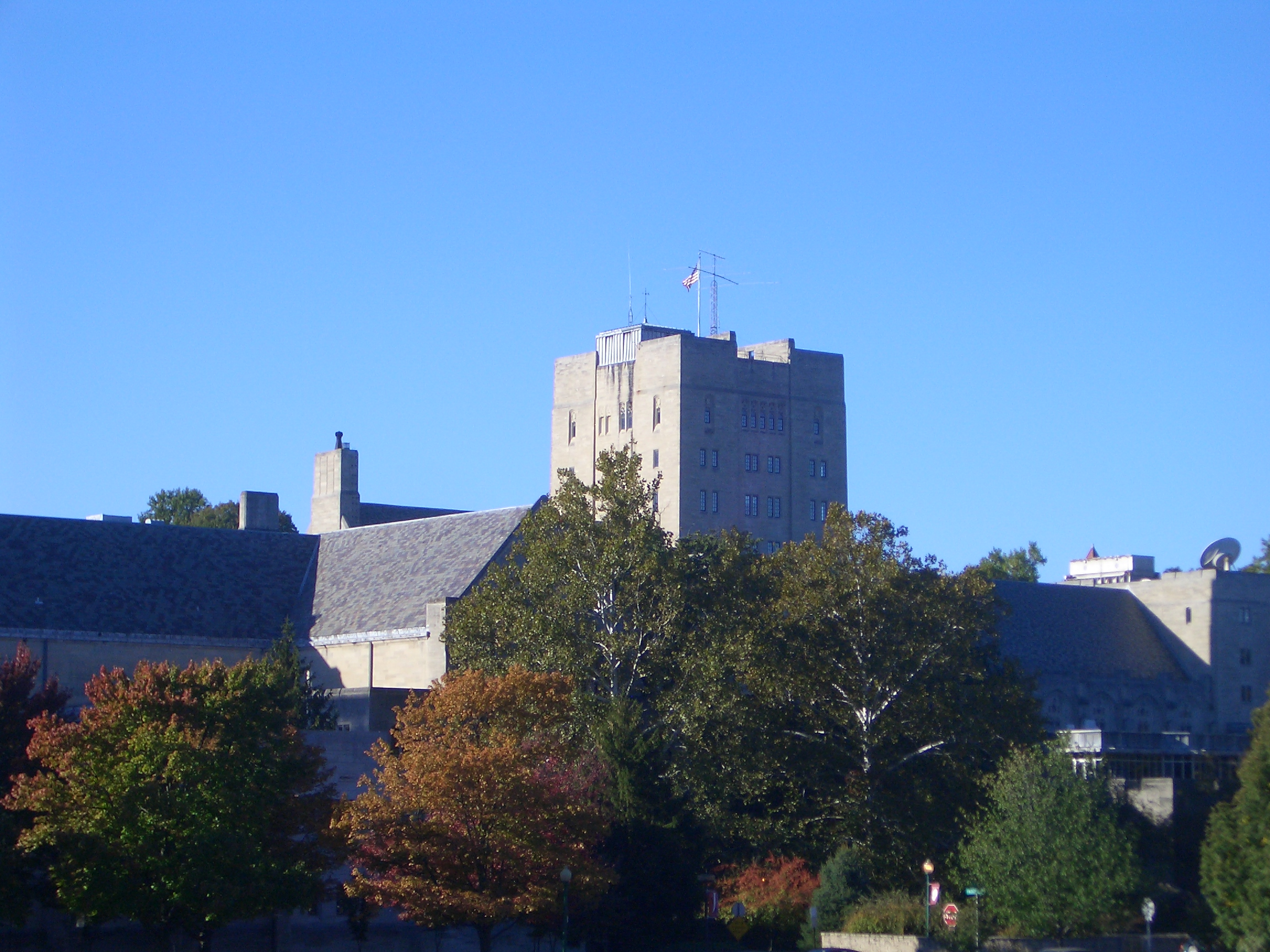
- The Indiana Memorial Union

General information
- Type: Student union
- Opened: June 13, 1932

Website
- imu.indiana.edu

The Indiana Memorial Union (IMU) is a student union building at Indiana University Bloomington in Bloomington, Indiana, United States. It is located at 900 E 7th Street, facing the Campus River and the Dunn Meadow.

The Indiana Memorial Union was dedicated on June 13, 1932. At nearly 500,000 square feet (46,000 m^{2}), it is one of the world's largest student unions. The IMU contains a hotel, restaurants, a bookstore, a bowling alley, an electronics store and gathering spaces for lecturers, meetings, conferences and performances. The building also houses IU's student government offices within the Student Activities Tower, where as many as 50 campus organizations conduct regular meetings.

Initial construction of the building took place from 1931 to 1932, and was designed by the firm Granger and Bollenbacher. The Biddle Hotel and Conference Center was added in 1960. The wing contains 189 guest rooms and over 50,000 square feet of meeting space. The IMU hosts more than 17,000 events every year.

On the first floor of the IMU the Memorial Room pays tribute to members of the Indiana University community that have served in the U.S. military. Contained within this room is the Golden Book, which contains the names of IU's service members going back to the War of 1812.

John Whittenberger, a student, founded the Indiana Union in 1909. Every student at Indiana University's Bloomington campus is a member of the Indiana Memorial Union by default. The Indiana Memorial Union Board is the governing body of the Indiana Memorial Union. The Union Board is led by a group of 16 student directors, a faculty representative, an administrative representative, an alumni representative, and the Executive Director of the Indiana Memorial Union. This 20-person committee is known as the Union Board of Directors.
