= Monroe Lake =

Reservoir in Brown and Monroe counties, Indiana, U.S.

Lake Monroe
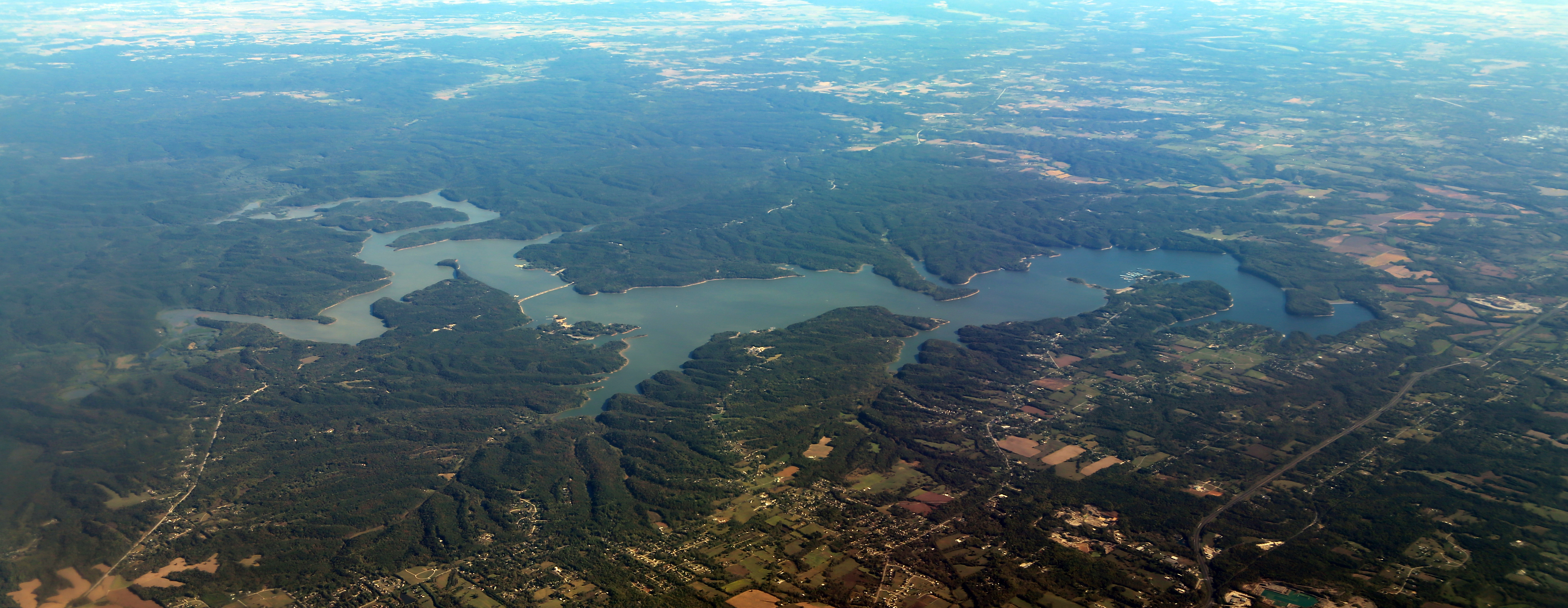
- Aerial of Lake Monroe in 2019

- Location within Indiana Location within the United States
- Location: Monroe / Brown counties, Indiana, United States
- Coordinates: 39°03′31″N 86°26′47″W
- Type: Reservoir
- Primary inflows: Salt Creek
- Primary outflows: Salt Creek
- Basin countries: United States
- Surface area: 10,750 acres (4,350 ha)
- Max. depth: 59 ft (18 m)
- Water volume: 1.03×10^{10} to 1.51×10^{10} cubic feet (292×10^{6} to 428×10^{6} m^{3})
- Residence time: 185–408 days
- Shore length^{1}: 190 miles (310 km)
- Surface elevation: 538 ft (164 m)
- ^{1} Shore length is not a well-defined measure.

Lake Monroe (also referred to as Monroe Reservoir) is a reservoir located about 10 miles (16 km) southeast of Bloomington, Indiana, United States. The lake is the largest entirely situated in Indiana with 10,750 acres (43.5 km^{2}) of water surface area spread over the counties of Monroe and Brown. Capacity varies from 292 gigalitres (237,000 acre⋅ft) to 428 gigalitres (347,000 acre⋅ft) depending on water level. It is also home to 13,202 acres (53.43 km^{2}) of protected forest and three recreational areas (Fairfax, Hardin Ridge, and Paynetown). Indiana's only federally protected U.S. Wilderness Area, the 13,000-acre (53 km^{2}) Charles C. Deam Wilderness Area, is located on the south shore. The lake's watershed is 441 square miles, 82% of which is forested or farmland. The pool elevation (above sea level) is about 538 feet (164 m) year-round. During colder winters, limited ice fishing is available on protected backwater portions of the reservoir.

Ransburg Scout Reservation, a large Boy Scout camp comprising over 624 acres (253 ha), is situated along the eastern shore with a private dock system in Siscoe Bay (also known as Boy Scout Bay). The largest marina situated on the lake is the Fourwinds Resort and Marina with over 800 boats. The reservoir provides abundant fishing throughout the year, and recreational opportunities such as boating and water skiing attract visitors from throughout Indiana and the Midwest.

== Construction ==
Construction on the lake began in 1960 and was finished in 1965 at a cost of $16.5 million. Salt Creek was dammed south of Bloomington, Indiana and the reservoir fills the valley to the northeast of the dam extending into adjacent Brown County. It was thought that Elkinsville, a town in southern Brown County, had to be abandoned due to the path of the backwaters. Therefore, the town was acquired through the power of eminent domain. Later, this was found not to be necessary; the result of a mistake in elevation estimates. The lake was designed as a primary water source for the City of Bloomington and to prevent flood damage downstream. The lake was created and is still managed by the U.S. Army Corps of Engineers, Louisville District.

== Ecological services ==
Lake Monroe is jointly managed by the Indiana Department of Natural Resources and the Army Corps of Engineers. As part of the Reservoir Habitat Enhancement Program, which began in 2016, 'Hoosier Cubes' and pallet structures have been installed to promote fish populations. These structures provide cover for fish and accumulate periphyton, a mix of algae, fungi, and bacteria, that attracts fish and insects.
