= Bloomington station (disambiguation) =

Bloomington station could refer to:

- Uptown Station, a train station serving Bloomington (Normal), Illinois, United States
- Bloomington freight station, a historic freight house in Bloomington, Indiana, United States
- Bloomington GO Station, a train station in Oak Ridges, Ontario, Canada
