= Second Baptist Church (Bloomington, Indiana) =

Historic church in Indiana, United States

- U.S. National Register of Historic Places
- U.S. Historic district – Contributing property
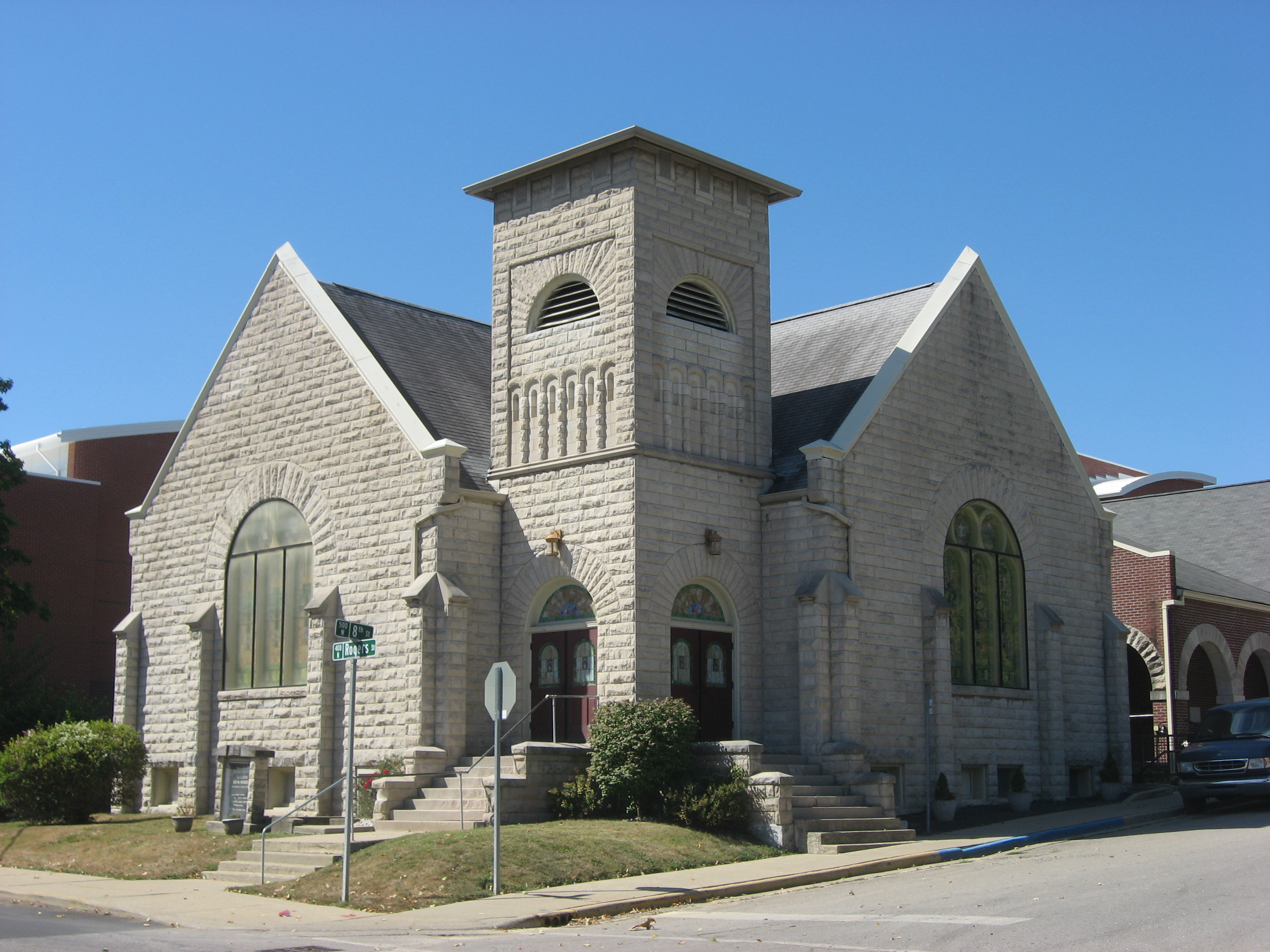
- Second Baptist Church, September 2010

- Location within Indiana Location within the United States
- Location: 321 N. Rogers St., Bloomington, Indiana
- Coordinates: 39°10′9″N 86°32′20″W
- Built: 1913
- Architect: Samuel Plato
- Architectural style: Romanesque
- Part of: Bloomington West Side Historic District (ID97000055)
- NRHP reference No.: 95001108

Significant dates
- Added to NRHP: September 14, 1995
- Designated CP: February 14, 1997

Second Baptist Church is a historic Baptist church located at Bloomington, Indiana. It was designed by noted African-American architect Samuel Plato and built in 1913. It is a one-story, "L"-plan, Romanesque Revival style stone building on a raised basement. It features broad round arched openings, a two-story bell tower, lancet windows, and oculus tracery.

It was listed on the National Register of Historic Places in 1983. It is located in the Bloomington West Side Historic District.
