= Virginia Avenue Colored School =

- U.S. National Register of Historic Places
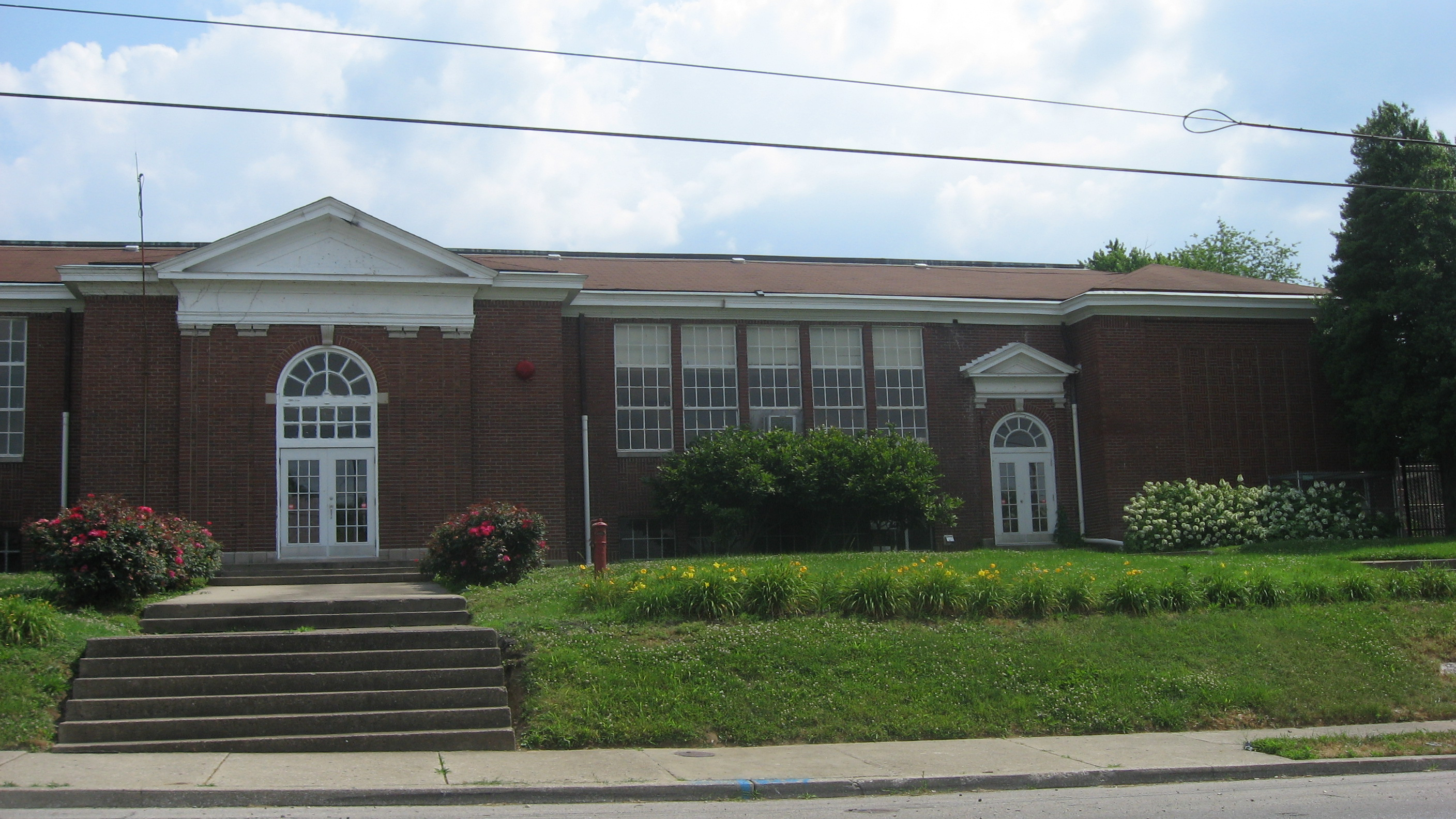

- Location within Kentucky Location within the United States
- Location: 3628 Virginia Ave., Louisville, Kentucky
- Coordinates: 38°14′18″N 85°48′53″W
- Area: 4.1 acres (1.7 ha)
- Built: 1923
- Built by: Plato, Samuel M.
- Architect: Colley, J. Merrick
- Architectural style: Renaissance
- NRHP reference No.: 04000244
- Added to NRHP: March 31, 2004

The Virginia Avenue Colored School is a historic school building at 3628 Virginia Avenue in Louisville, Kentucky. Built in 1923 to address overcrowding of a 1915 building, the school was the city's first purpose-built segregated school for African-Americans. It was built by Samuel M. Plato, a prolific local African-American building contractor, and is Renaissance Revival in style. It was enlarged in 1954 and again in 1969 in an attempt to stave off forced integration. It was renamed Jessie R. Carter Elementary School in 1970, and was finally integrated in 1975.

The building was listed on the National Register of Historic Places in 2004. It presently houses the West End School, a private boarding school for boys up to 8th grade.

== See also ==
- National Register of Historic Places listings in Louisville's West End
