= Samuel Plato =

American architect (1882–1957)

Samuel M. Plato
- Born: 1882; Waugh, Alabama, U.S.
- Died: May 1957; Louisville, Kentucky, U.S.
- Education: Simmons College of Kentucky, ICS Learn (International Correspondence Schools)
- Alma mater: Mount Meigs Colored Institute
- Occupation(s): Architect, building contractor, carpenter
- Known for: J. Woodrow Wilson House (Marion, Indiana); * Broadway Temple A.M.E. Zion Church (Louisville, Kentucky); * Virginia Avenue Colored School, (Louisville)

Samuel M. Plato (1882–1957) was an American architect and building contractor in the United States. His work includes federal housing projects and U.S. post offices, as well as private homes, banks, churches, and schools. During World War II, the Alabama native was one of the few African-American contractors in the country to be awarded wartime building contracts, which included Wake and Midway Halls (dormitories for more than 800 African-American defense workers in Washington, D.C.). He also received contracts to build at least thirty-eight U.S. post offices across the country.

Plato began his career as an architect and building contractor in 1902 in Marion, Indiana, at a time when segregation and racism made it challenging for African-American professionals such as architects. In 1921 he relocated to Louisville, Kentucky, where he spent the remainder of his life. Some of Plato's major buildings are listed on the National Register of Historic Places. These include Louisville's Broadway Temple A.M.E. Zion Church and the Virginia Avenue Colored School, two examples of his contributions to the city's African-American community. Other projects include the J. Woodrow Wilson House in Marion, Indiana, and the Second Baptist Church in Bloomington, Indiana.

== Early life and education ==
Samuel M. Plato was born in 1882 Waugh in Montgomery County, Alabama, to James and Katie (Hendricks) Plato. Samuel's father, James, was a farmer who taught him carpentry and other construction trades.

Plato graduated from Mount Meigs Colored Institute near his home in Alabama and spent an additional year studying at Winston-Salem, North Carolina, before enrolling in 1898 at State University Normal School (present-day Simmons College of Kentucky) in Louisville, Kentucky. He began working at construction sites during summer breaks while still in college and graduated in 1902. He also completed a mail-order program in architecture from the International Correspondence Schools of Scranton, Pennsylvania.

== Career ==
Plato began working as a building contractor in the early 1900s, when discrimination against African Americans often relegated them to jobs as unskilled laborers. Despite these challenges, he found work as a carpenter, but refused to settle on this labor-intensive work. Instead, he chose to pursue a career as an architect and building contractor, which provided better employment opportunities and potential pay. Plato was a pioneer African-American architect in the Midwest. Around 1902, soon after his graduation from college, he moved to Marion, Indiana, where he spent nineteen years as an architect and building contractor before returning to Louisville, Kentucky, around 1921. In addition to projects in Indiana and Kentucky, Plato designed and built other structures across the United States.

=== Indiana projects ===
During his year in Indiana, at a time when the Ku Klux Klan reached an all-time record half a million members in the state, Plato found support from wealthy business owners John Schaumleffel and J. Woodrow Wilson. Plato also had a partnership for about ten years with Jasper Burden, a black building contractor in Marion. Plato's early projects in Marion include the Second Baptist Church, completed in 1905; the Classical Revival-style First Baptist Church, commissioned in 1913; and the Platonian Apartments, built in 1910.

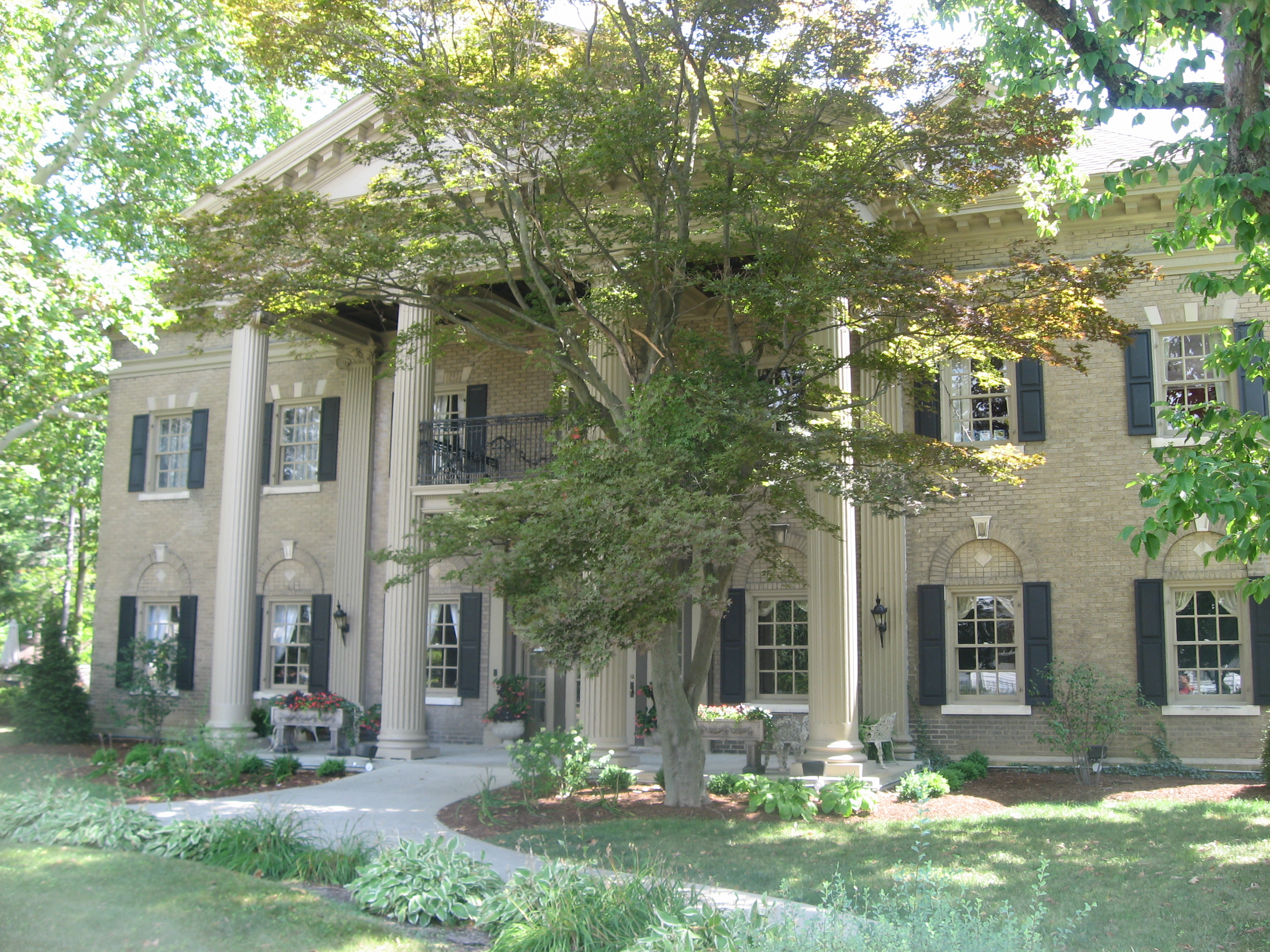
J. Woodrow Wilson House, July 2012

One of Plato's best-known residential projects was designing and building the fifteen-room J. Woodrow Wilson House in Marion in 1912. The Neoclassical-style home was "one of the finest structures in the city" and reportedly cost $135,000 at the time of its construction. Wilson House (also known as the Wilson-Vaughan Home and the Hostess House) was added to the National Register of Historic Places in 1988.

Plato received contracts to design and build other private residences and commercial buildings in Marion and elsewhere in Indiana. Examples of his work include the First United Baptist Church in Wabash and the Second Baptist Church (added to the National Register of Historic Places in 1983) in Bloomington, Indiana. Another project was the Swallow-Robin residence hall, which was built in 1917 on the Taylor University campus in Upland, Indiana.

While working in Marion, Plato became known for providing employment opportunities for black and white people on his construction projects at a time when it was a rare practice for black businessmen to hire white workers in the early decades of the twentieth century. According to a 1928 national survey that was published in the 1931-32 Negro Year Book, less than 1.2 percent of black-owned businesses employed white workers. Plato's practice of hiring African-American workers for his projects, especially for work that required skilled labor, gave them a chance to improve their skills. His efforts were also successful in opening the building trade unions to African-American workers.

=== Kentucky projects ===
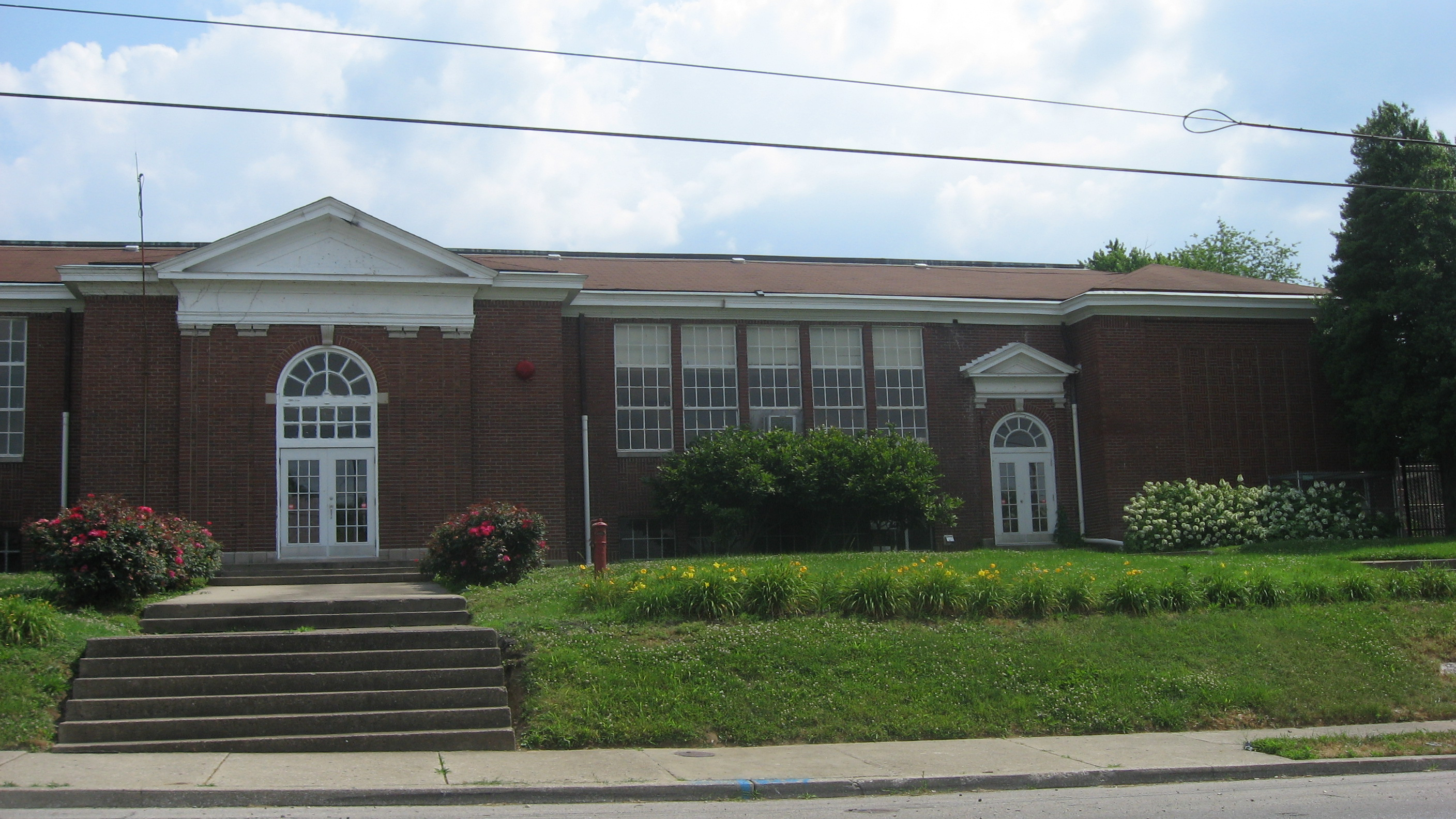
Virginia Avenue School, Louisville, Kentucky

Plato left Marion around 1920 or 1921 to return to Louisville, Kentucky, where he continued his career as an architect and builder. His major projects in the Louisville area include the Broadway Temple A.M.E. Zion Church (added to the National Register of Historic Places in 1980) and the James Lee Memorial Presbyterian Church. Plato also designed the Virginia Avenue Colored School (added to the National Register of Historic Places in 2004). and Simmons College of Kentucky's Steward Hall, a part of the school's Municipal College Campus (added to the National Register of Historic Places in 1976), as well as two banks in Louisville. A residential area that Plato helped develop was named Plato Terrace in his honor. Around 1945 he helped to establish the city's Westover subdivision of small, two-bedroom houses.

=== Federal government projects ===
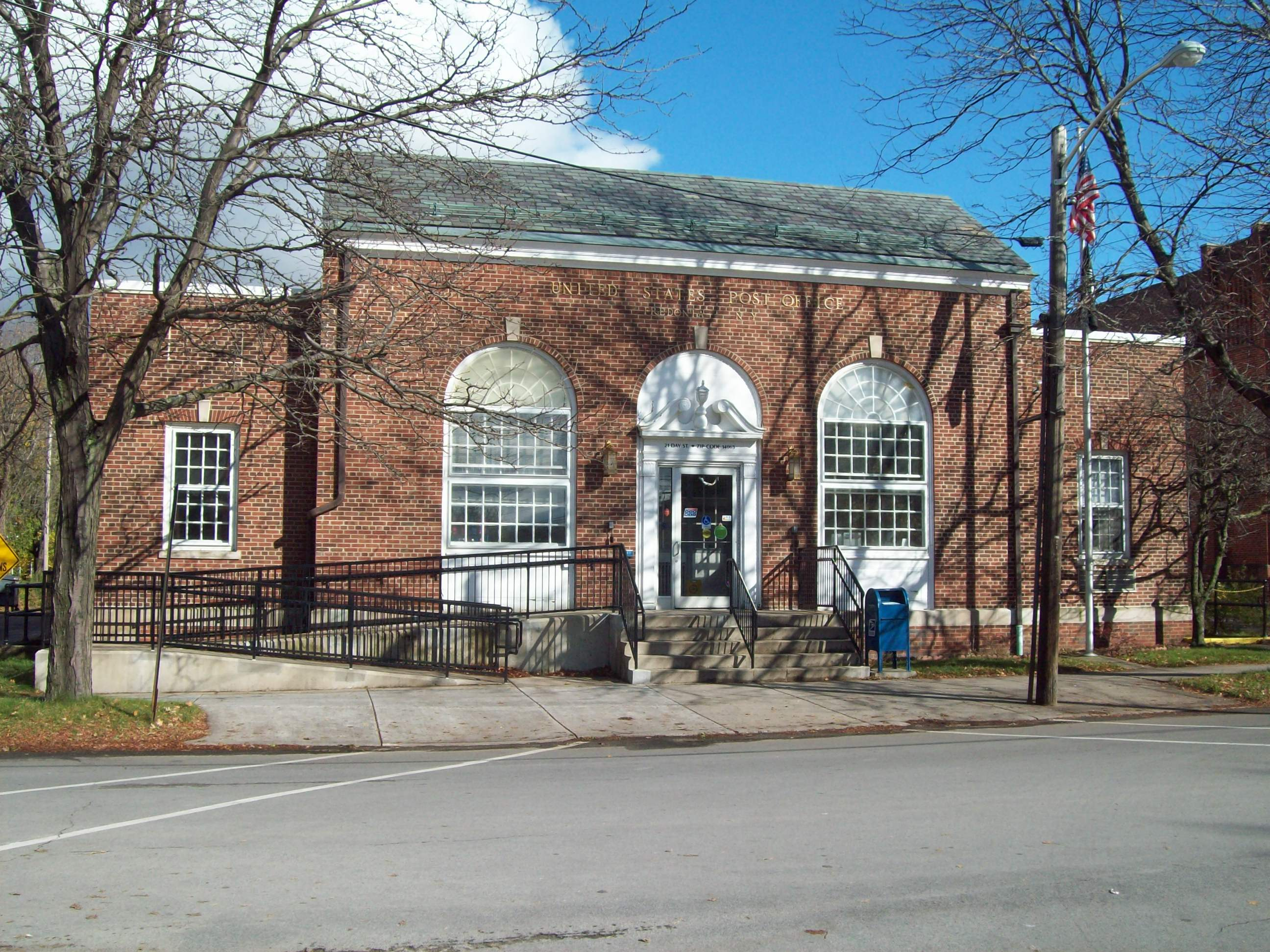
U.S. Post Office at Fredonia, New York

Plato is best known for his work on federal housing projects and reportedly became the first African-American to be awarded a contract to build a U.S. post office. He was awarded contracts, mostly in the 1930s, to build at least 38 U.S. post offices in towns such as Coldwater, Ohio; Goshen, New York; Fredonia, New York; Eaton, New York; Morgantown, West Virginia; and Decatur, Alabama. Officials hired Plato to work on the post office in Decatur without realizing he was black. To avoid a potentially unpleasant situation, he skipped the welcome party and immediately went to work on the project. Other federal government projects included a government building in New Philadelphia, Ohio, and contracts to build federal armories in Xenia and Zanesville, Ohio.

Plato's federal government housing projects for defense workers during World War II brought him national attention. Between 1941 and 1946, Plato was one of the few African-American architects and contractors in the United States to be awarded wartime contracts. Although President Franklin D. Roosevelt issued Executive Order 8802 in June 1941 prohibiting discriminatory practices in defense jobs and in awarding federal defense contracts during World War II, national defense industries continued to discriminate against African Americans and overlooked black businesses in awarding federal government contracts. Plato's defense workers housing projects include Wake and Midway Halls, which were dormitories to accommodate more than 800 African-American defense workers in Washington, D.C. Another of his federal housing projects was Sparrows Point, a 304-unit complex in Baltimore, Maryland.

== Community service ==
In addition to his architectural career, Plato was active in several civic organizations that included the Young Women's Christian Association, the National Urban League, and the National Negro Business League. Plato was a member of Phi Beta Sigma fraternity's Epsilon Beta Sigma alumni chapter. He also served as vice president of the National Negro Builders Association in 1927. In addition, Plato was in demand as a speaker at the Tuskegee Institute, the Hampton Institute, and a special lecturer at Howard University's School of Engineering and Architecture.

== Marriage and family ==
Few details are known of Plato's personal life. His first wife, Nettie Plato, is buried at Marion, Indiana. His second wife, Elnora Davis Lucas Plato (1891–1975) "built her own successful dressmaking business" before marrying Plato while he was a resident of Marion. She also used funds from her business earnings to help her husband and was "his constant travel companion and business manager." Around 1929, Samuel built a modified Tudor Revival-style home for himself and his wife in the Russell neighborhood of Louisville, Kentucky.

Plato believed in helping others and devoting himself to his family. "In 1939 he devised a plan to move his sister and her family off the old homestead in Waugh, Alabama, and into a new home nearby." Elnora Plato "funded the cost of Samuel's sister's new house in Waugh and "on more than one occasion, she was able to keep heir [sic] company from going bankrupt." Samuel and Elnora Plato also "helped put several nieces and nephews though college and graduate school." In addition, he employed "some of them on jobs in Louisville and Washington, D.C.

== Death and legacy ==
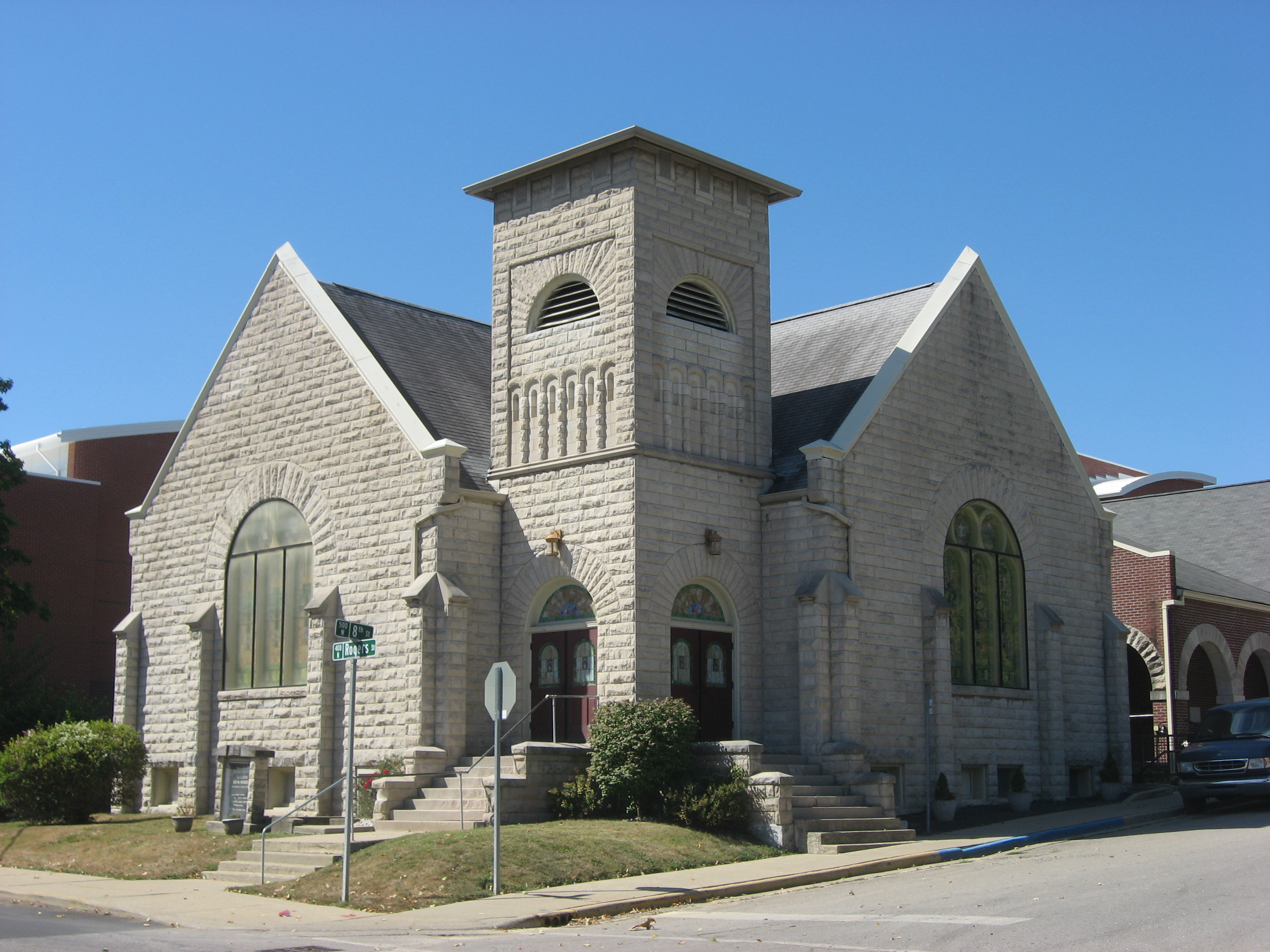
Plato's Second Baptist Church in Bloomington, Indiana.

Plato died in May 1957 in Louisville, Kentucky. He was a nationally-recognized as a pioneer an African-American architect and builder during the early 20th century. He began his career at a time when segregation and racism made it challenging for African-American professionals such as architects. Plato "was admired and respected" in the community. He once commented, "My whole goal in life has been to improve and help others who come up behind me." According to his wife, Elnora Plato, he "was a pioneer for years and he wanted his business to live. Then, too, he wanted to inspire young engineers."

Historians attribute Plato's successful career was due to his persistent efforts and his reputation for quality and integrity. His work was recognized in newspapers, the Negro Year Book, and Ebony magazine, among other publications. After visiting Wake and Midway Halls, two of his wartime federal defense workers' housing projects, First Lady Eleanor Roosevelt wrote about them in her newspaper column, "My Day," on May 20, 1943.

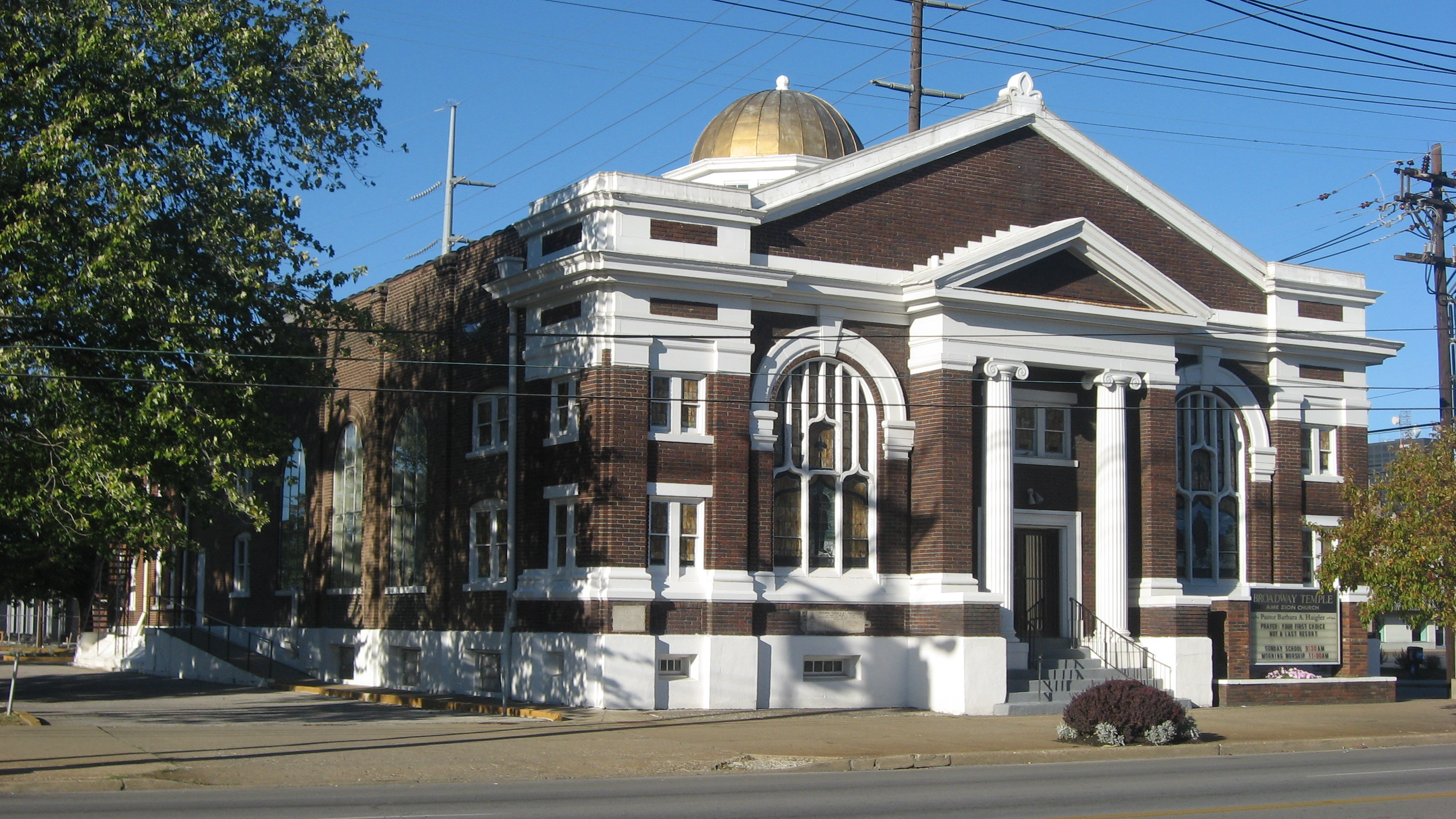
Broadway Temple A.M.E. Zion Church, Louisville, Kentucky

Plato designed and built a variety of structures in buildings Alabama, Indiana, Kentucky, Maryland, New York, Ohio, Pennsylvania, West Virginia, and Washington D.C. He is reportedly the first African American to design a U.S. post office and is credited with receiving contracts to build at least thirty-eight post offices across the United States. His work also included "Greek Revival and Craftsman-style houses" and "elegant mansions," as well as "banks, churches, schools, office buildings, theaters," and "federal government housing projects." At least eight of his projects are listed on the National Register of Historic Places. These include the Broadway Temple A.M.E. Zion Church and the Virginia Avenue Colored School in Louisville, Kentucky; the J. Woodrow Wilson House at Marion, Indiana; and the Second Baptist Church in Bloomington, Indiana, among others.

== Honors and awards ==
- Howard University's School of Engineering and Architecture, where Plato had been special lecturer, honored him posthumously in 1960.
- The Indiana Historical Bureau dedicated a state historical marker in Plato's honor on July 25, 2015, in front of the J. Woodrow Wilson House (Hostess House) in Marion, Indiana.
- A Kentucky state historical marker dedicated to Plato was erected in front of Broadway Temple A.M.E. Zion Church in Louisville, Kentucky, and dedicated in February 1919.

== Works ==
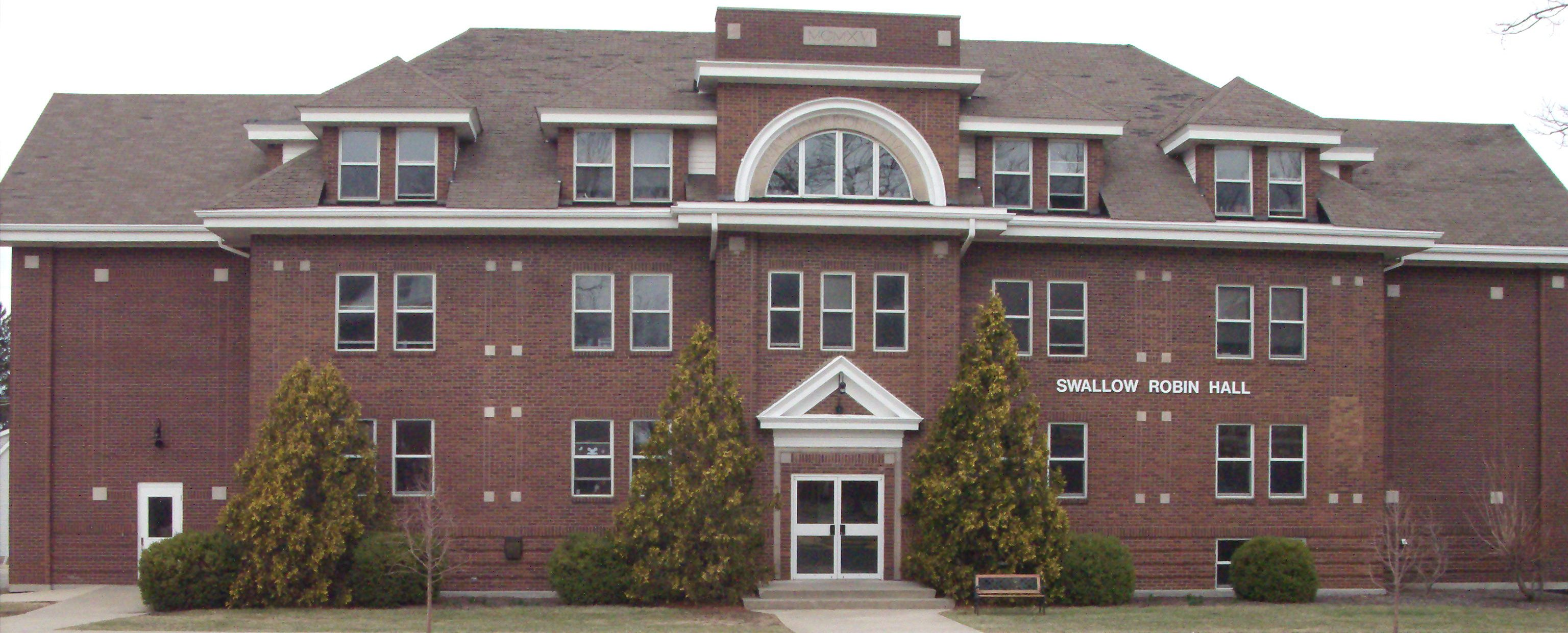
Swallow-Robin Hall at Taylor University in Upland, Indiana, was designed by Samuel Plato

=== Indiana ===
- First Baptist Church, Marion
- First United Baptist Church, Wabash
- J. Woodrow Wilson House (NRHP), Marion
- Platonian Apartments, Marion
- Second Baptist Church (NRHP), Bloomington
- Swallow-Robin residence hall at Taylor University, Upland

=== Kentucky ===
- Broadway Temple A.M.E. Zion Church (NRHP), Louisville
- Green Street Baptist Church, Louisville
- James Lee Presbyterian Church, Louisville
- Virginia Avenue School (NRHP), Louisville
- Steward Hall at Simmons College of Kentucky, Louisville

=== New York state ===
- U.S. Post Office, Fredonia

=== Ohio ===
- Pythian Temple, the present-day Martin Luther King Jr. Performing and Cultural Arts Complex (or King Arts Complex), Columbus
