= Bloomington West Side Historic District =

Historic district in Indiana, United States

- U.S. National Register of Historic Places
- U.S. Historic district
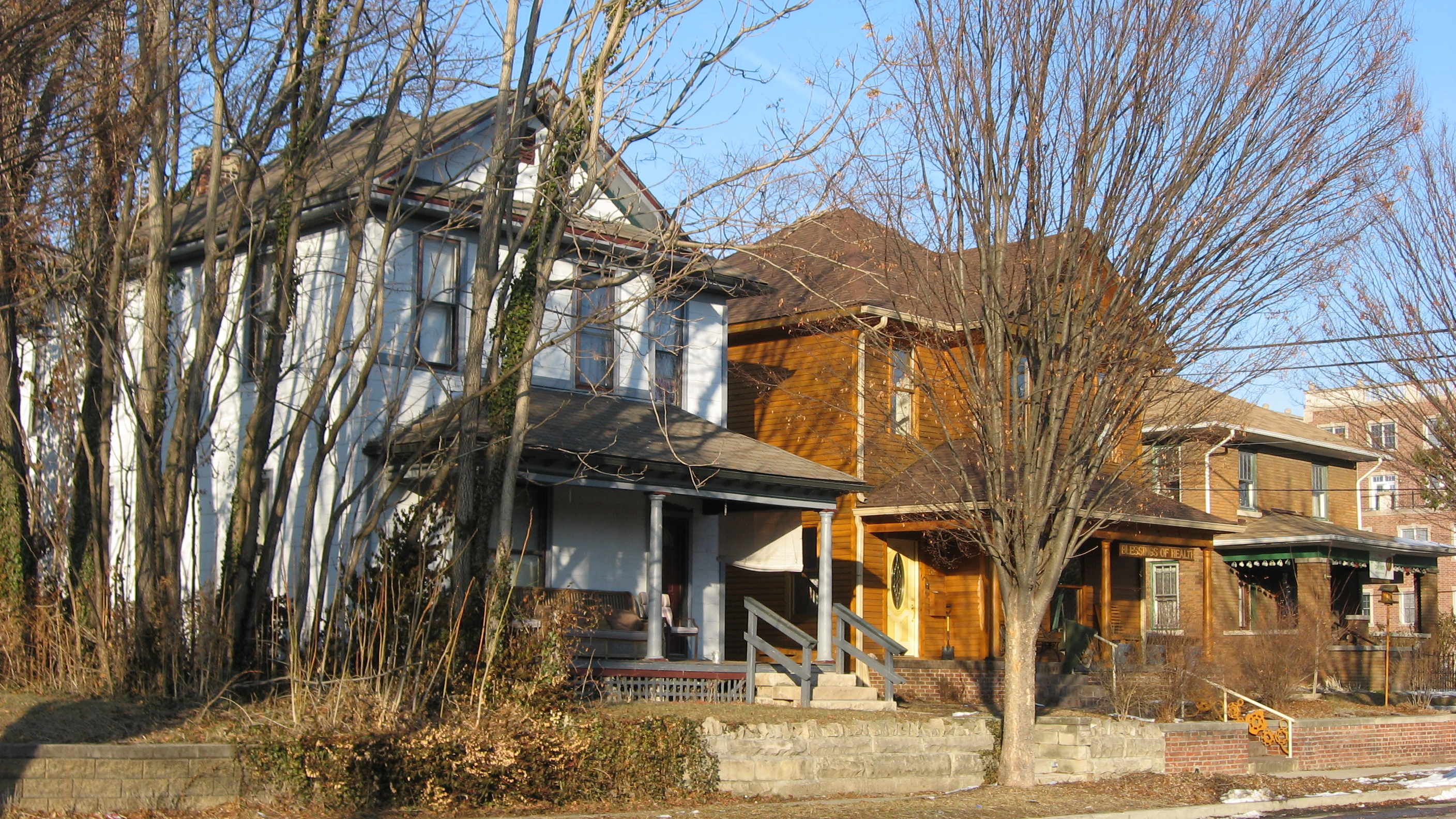
- Fourth Street in Bloomington's West Side, January 2011

- Location within Indiana Location within the United States
- Location: Roughly bounded by W. 10th, N. Morton, W. 4th, and N. Adams Sts., Bloomington, Indiana
- Coordinates: 39°10′07″N 86°32′24″W
- Area: 180 acres (73 ha)
- Architect: Nichols, John; Plato, Samuel
- Architectural style: Queen Anne, Bungalow/craftsman, gabled end
- NRHP reference No.: 97000055
- Added to NRHP: February 14, 1997

Bloomington West Side Historic District is a national historic district located at Bloomington, Indiana. The district encompasses 394 contributing buildings, two contributing sites, and two contributing structures in a mixed residential, commercial, and industrial section of Bloomington. It developed between about 1850 and 1946, and includes notable examples of Queen Anne and Bungalow/American Craftsman style architecture. Located in the district are the separately listed Elias Abel House, Cantol Wax Company Building, Coca-Cola Bottling Plant, Cochran-Helton-Lindley House, Illinois Central Railroad Freight Depot, Johnson's Creamery, and Second Baptist Church. Other notable contributing resources include the Works Progress Administration constructed wading pool, White Oak Cemetery, Ninth Street Park, Bloomington Wholesale Foods Warehouse (c. 1920), Bloomington Garage, Curry Buick, Banneker School, Bethel African Methodist Episcopal Church, and Bloomington Frosted Foods.

It was listed on the National Register of Historic Places in 1997.

== Gallery ==
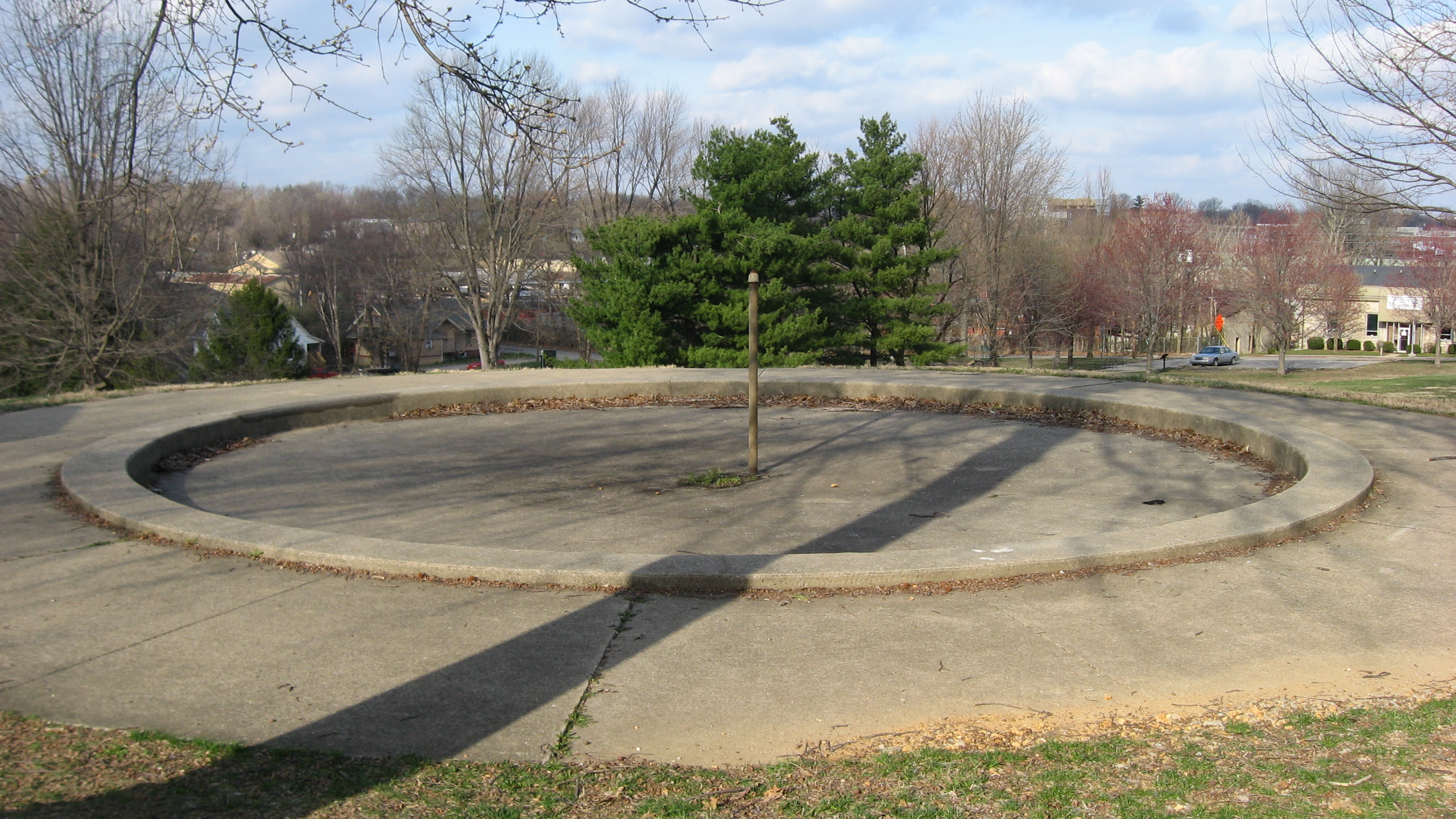
WPA wading pool

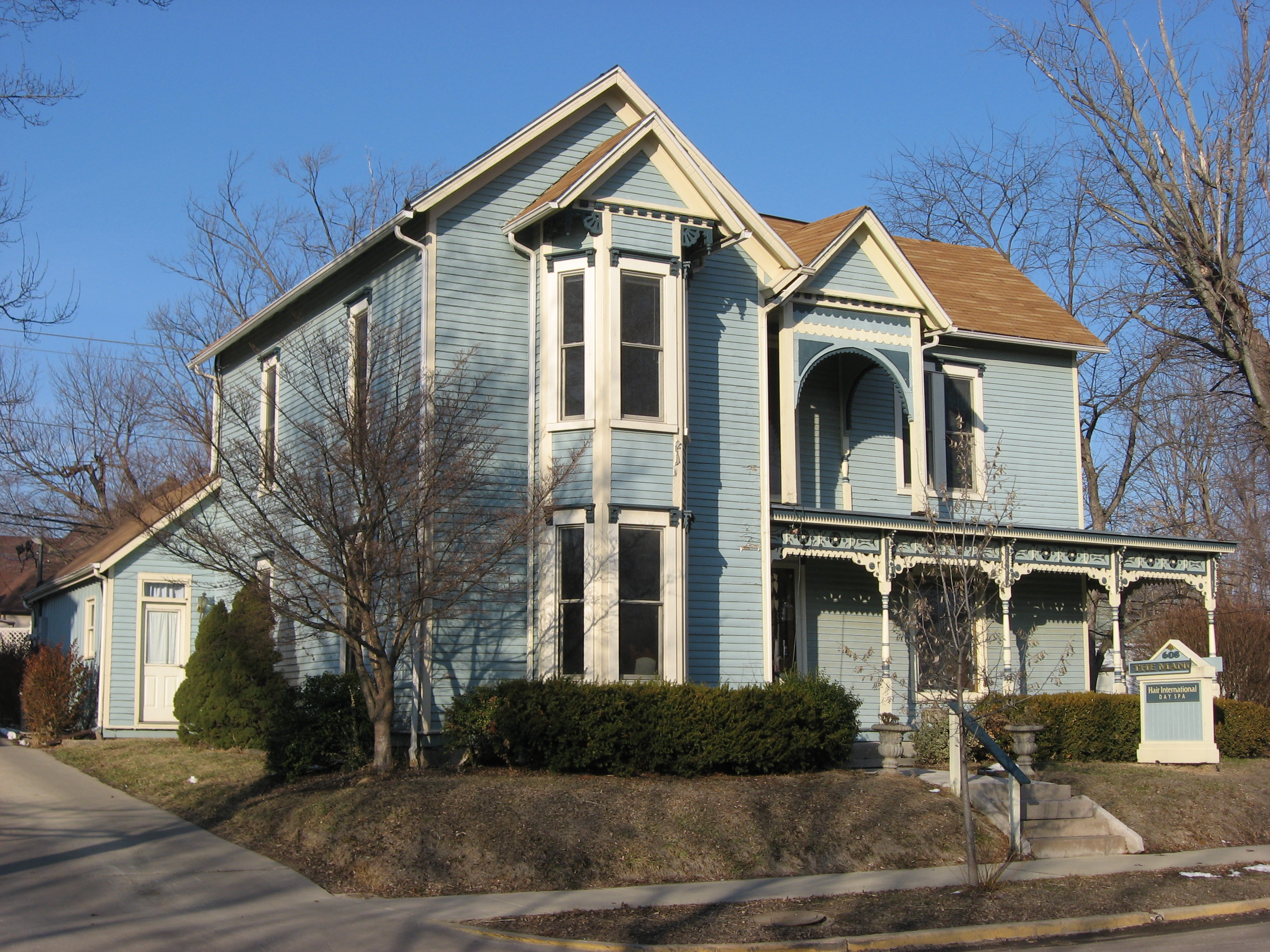
Graves Morrison House

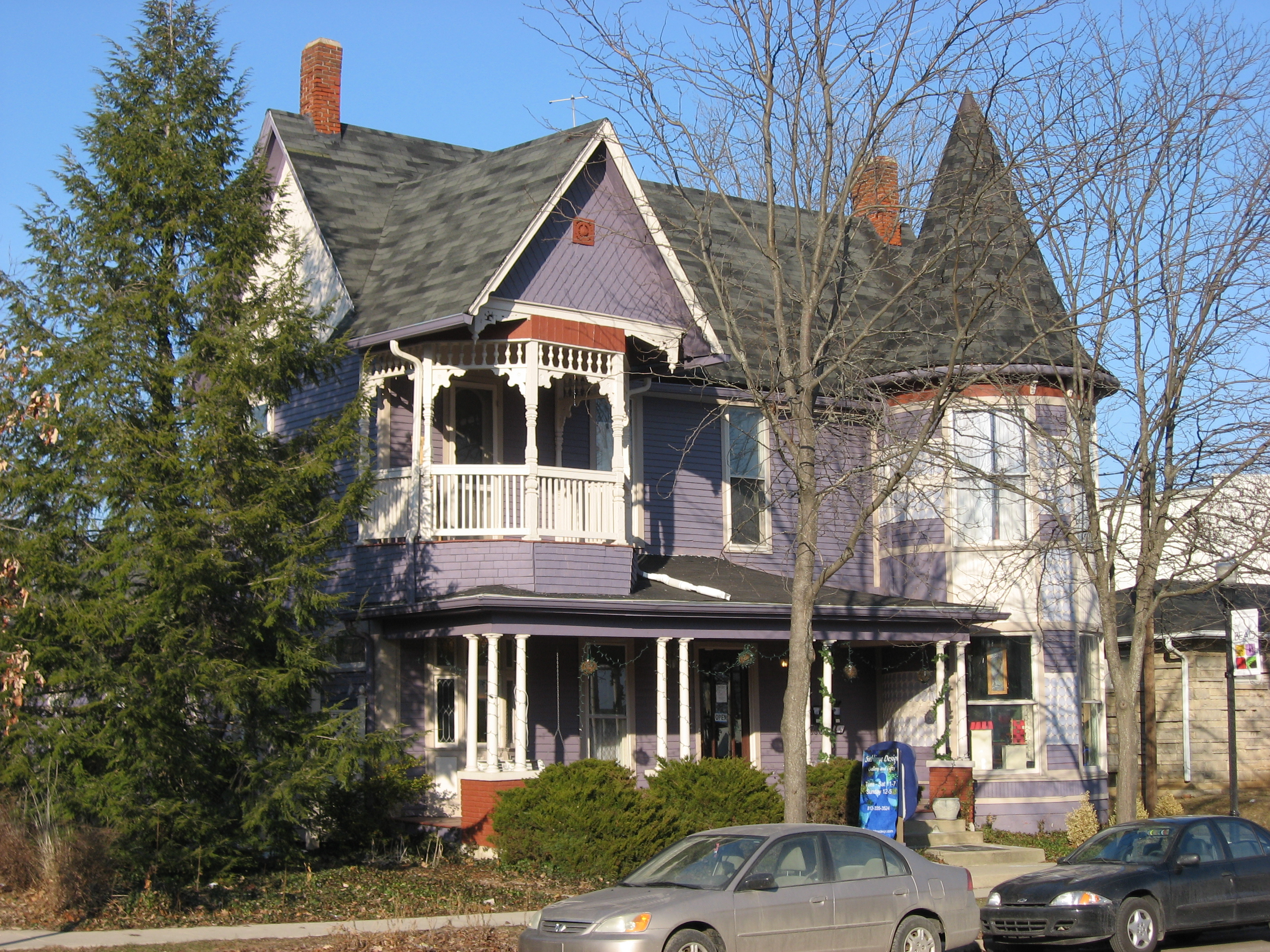
514 Kirkwood Avenue West

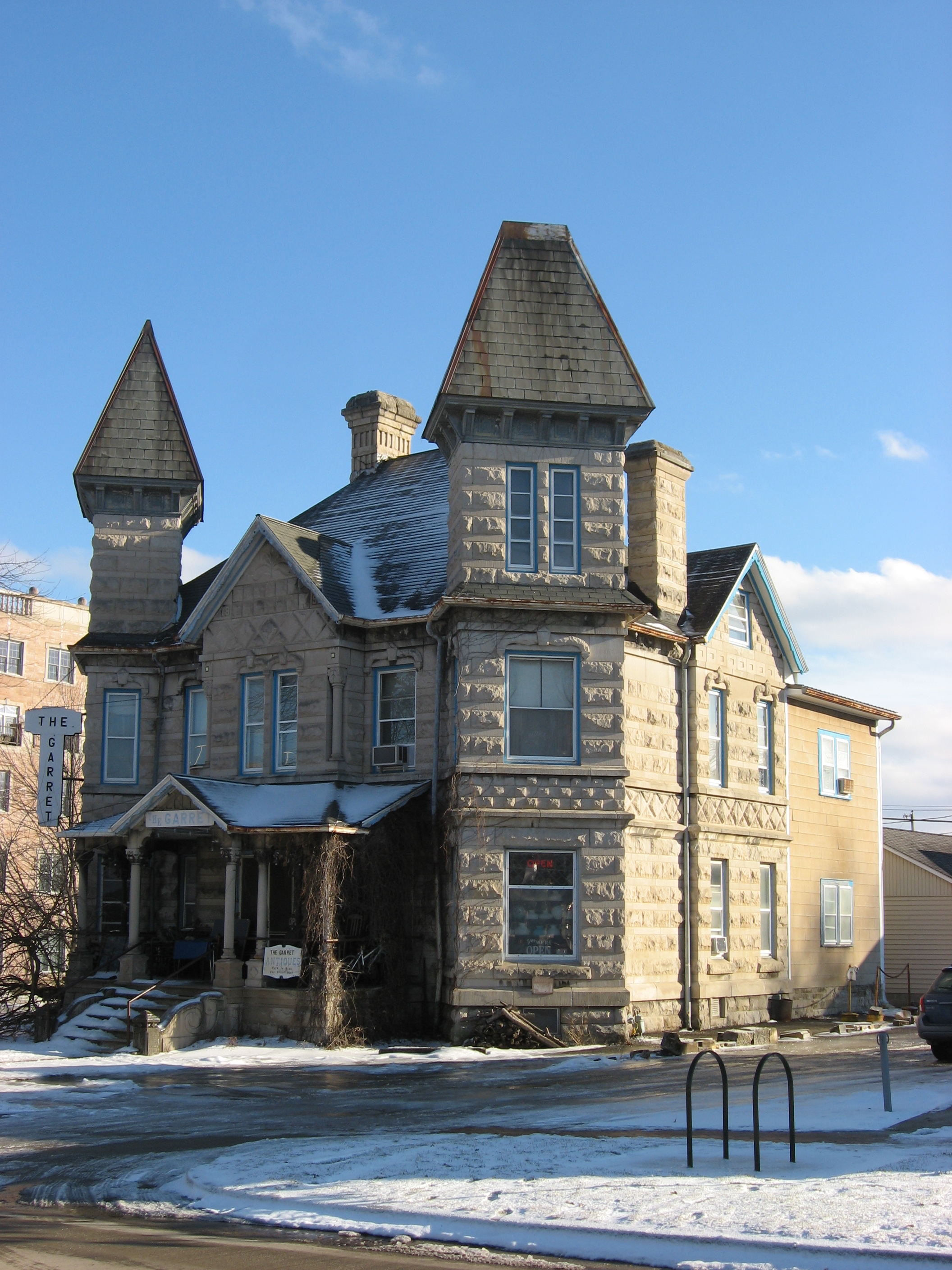
Batman House

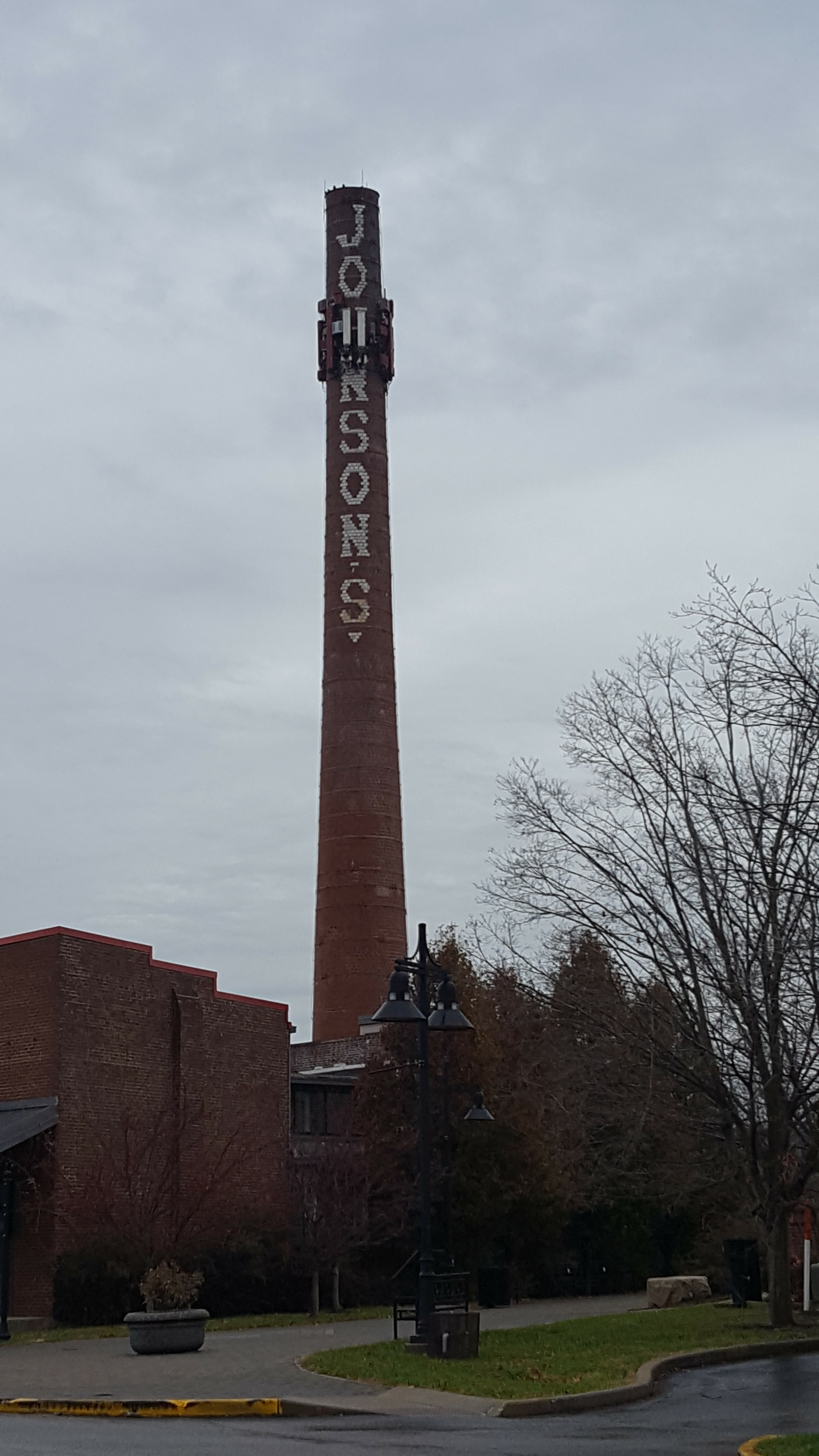
Johnson Creamery

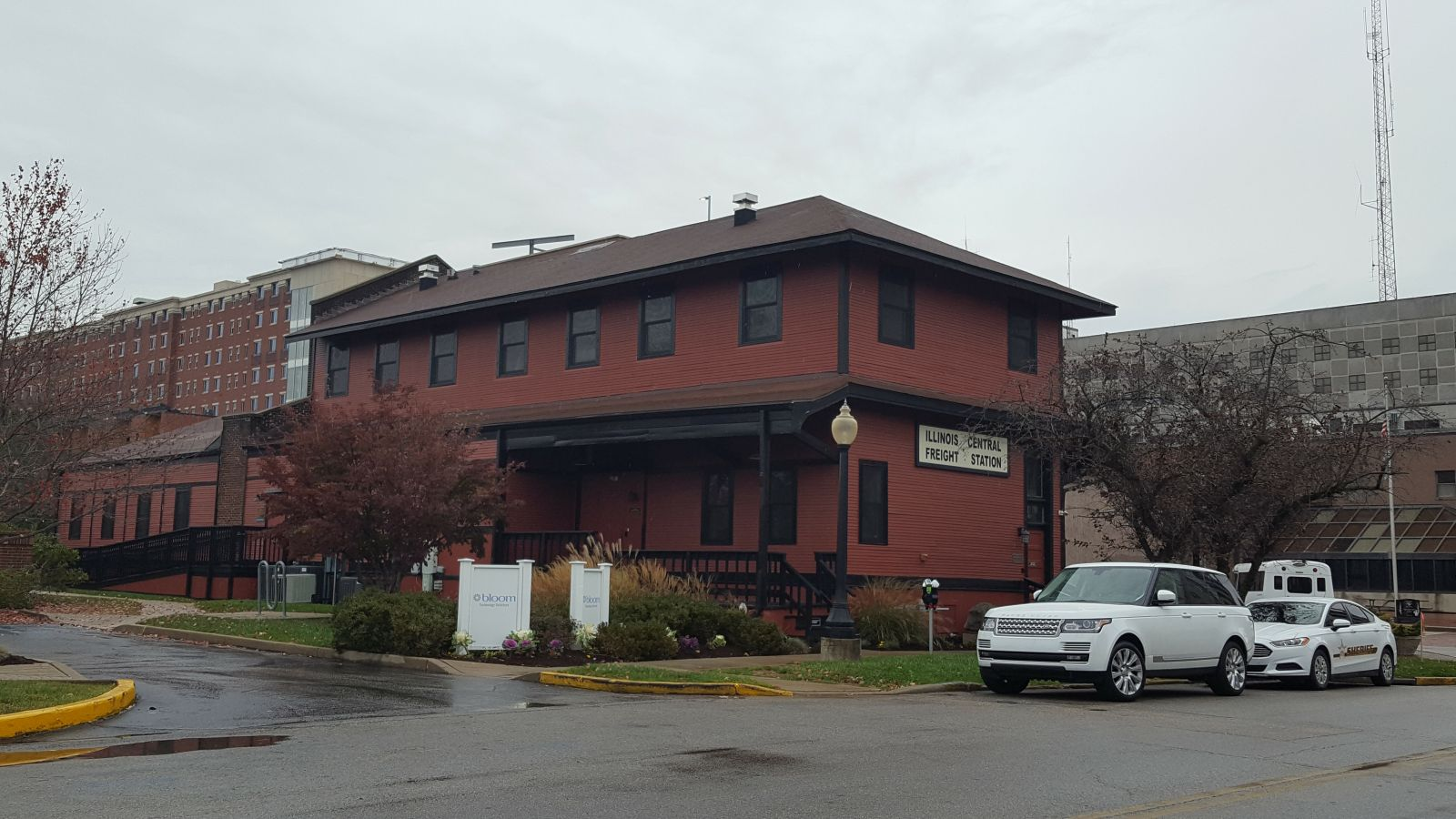
Illinois Central Railroad Freight Depot

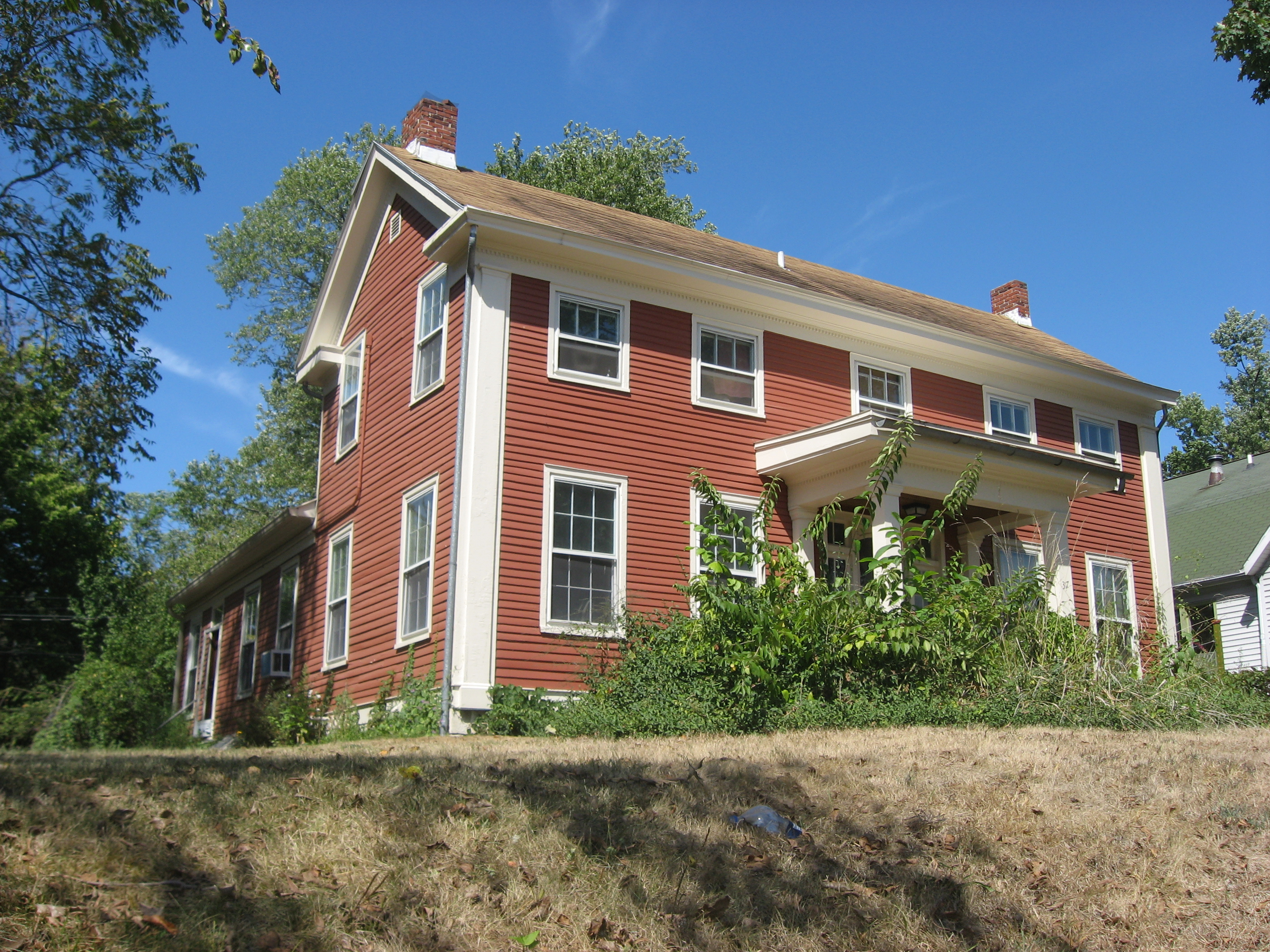
Elias Abel House

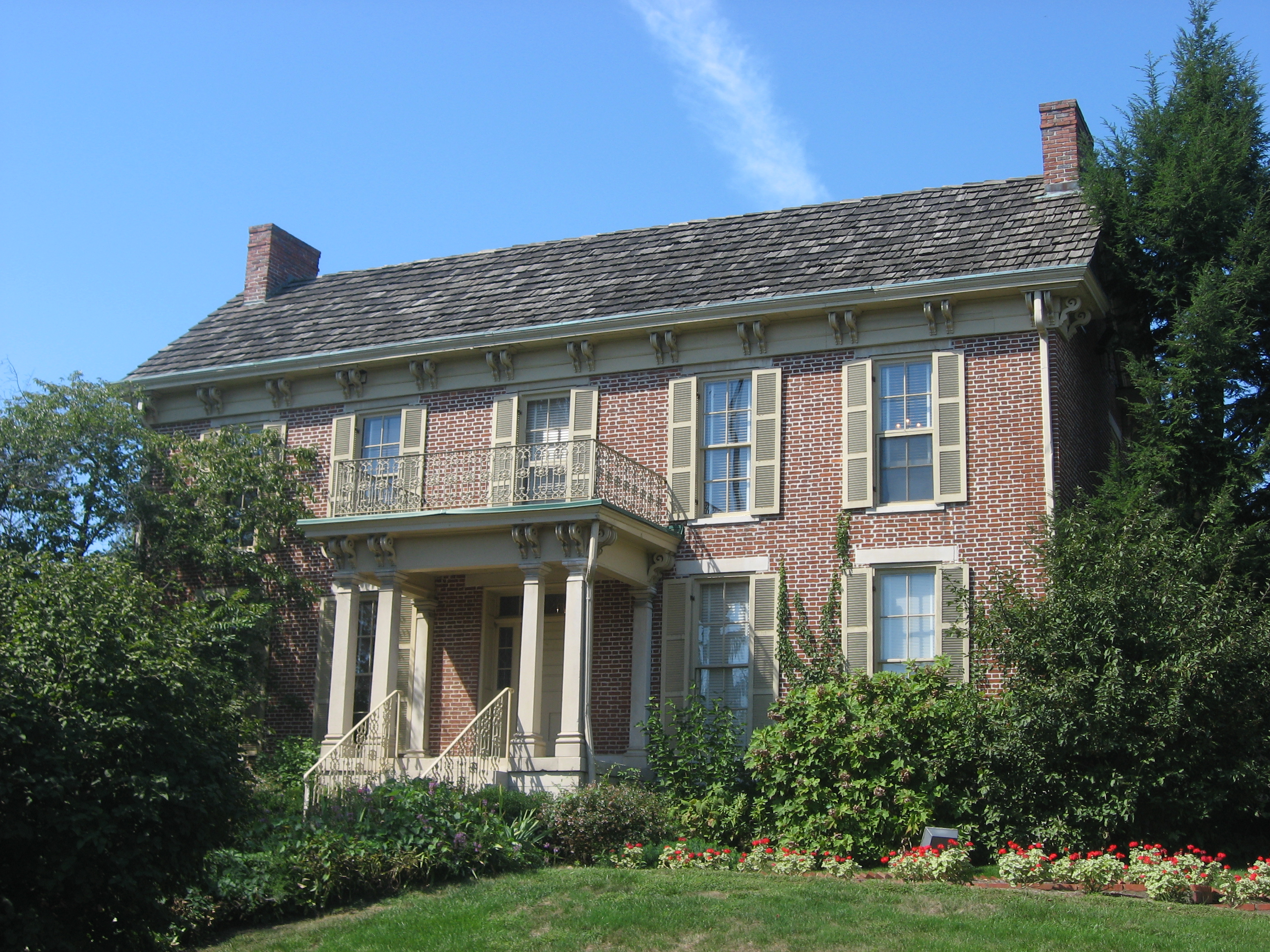
Cochran-Helton-Lindley House

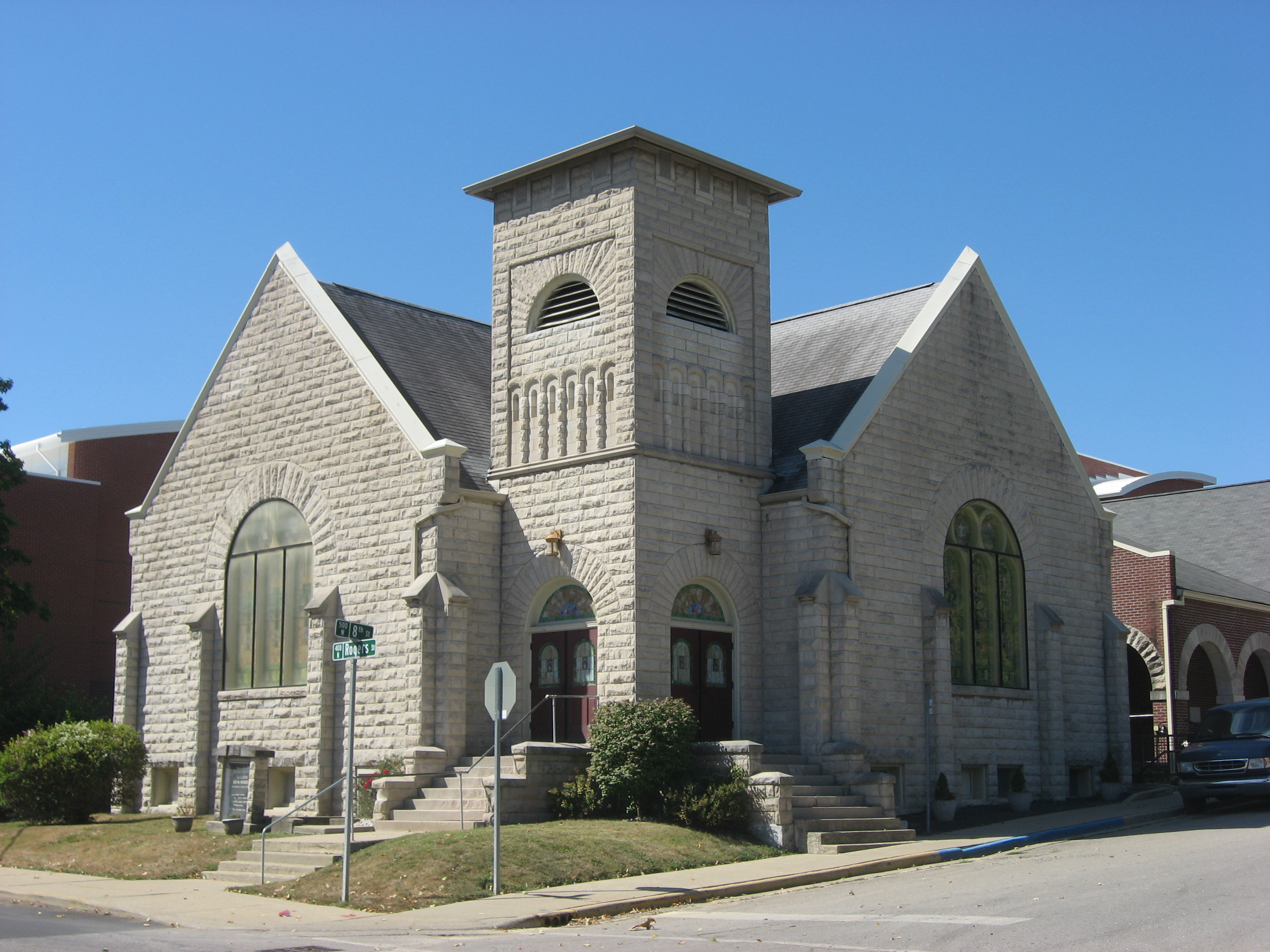
Second Baptist Church

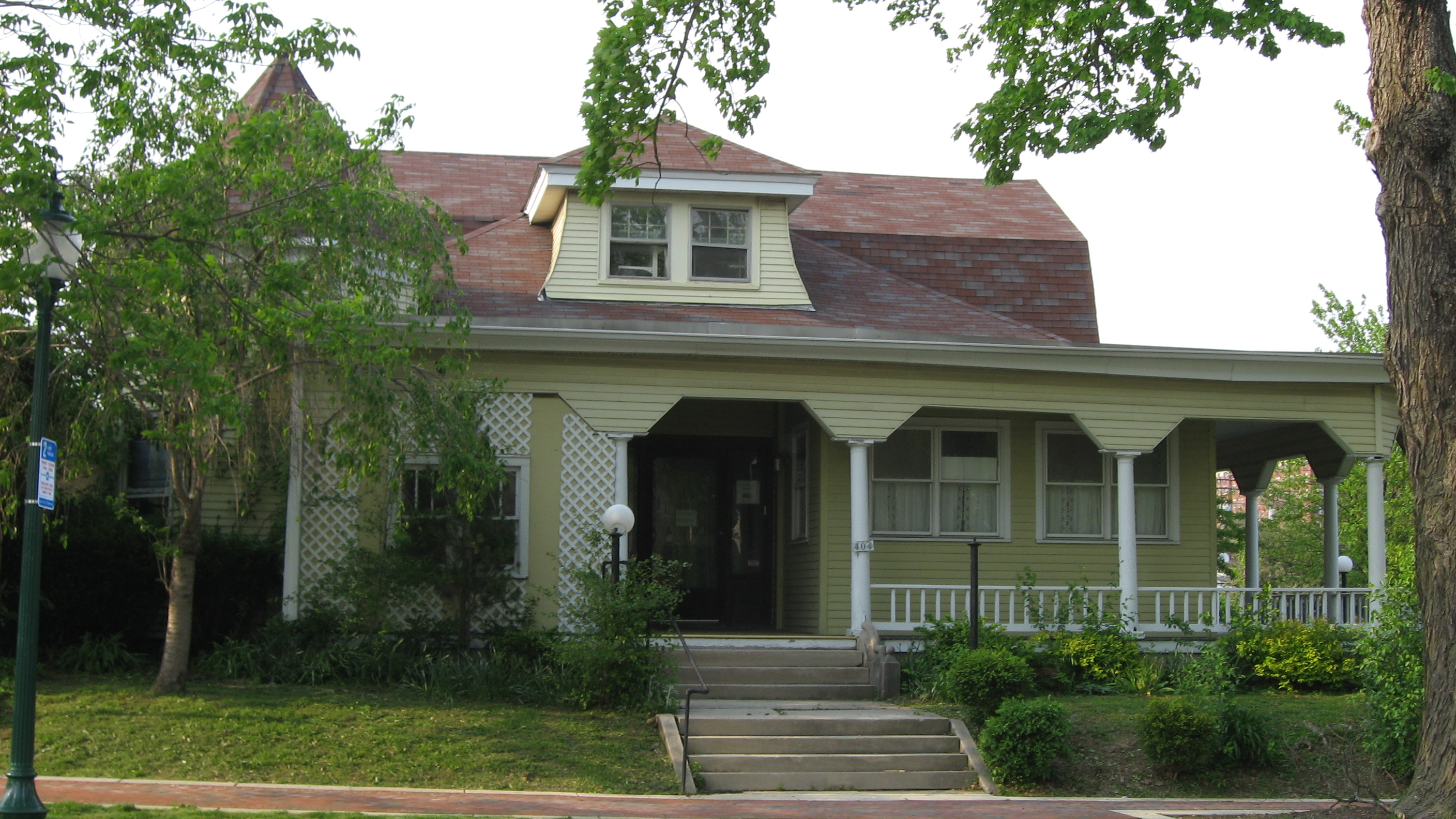
404 Kirkwood Avenue West
