= Elias Abel House =

Historic house in Indiana, United States

- U.S. National Register of Historic Places
- U.S. Historic district – Contributing property
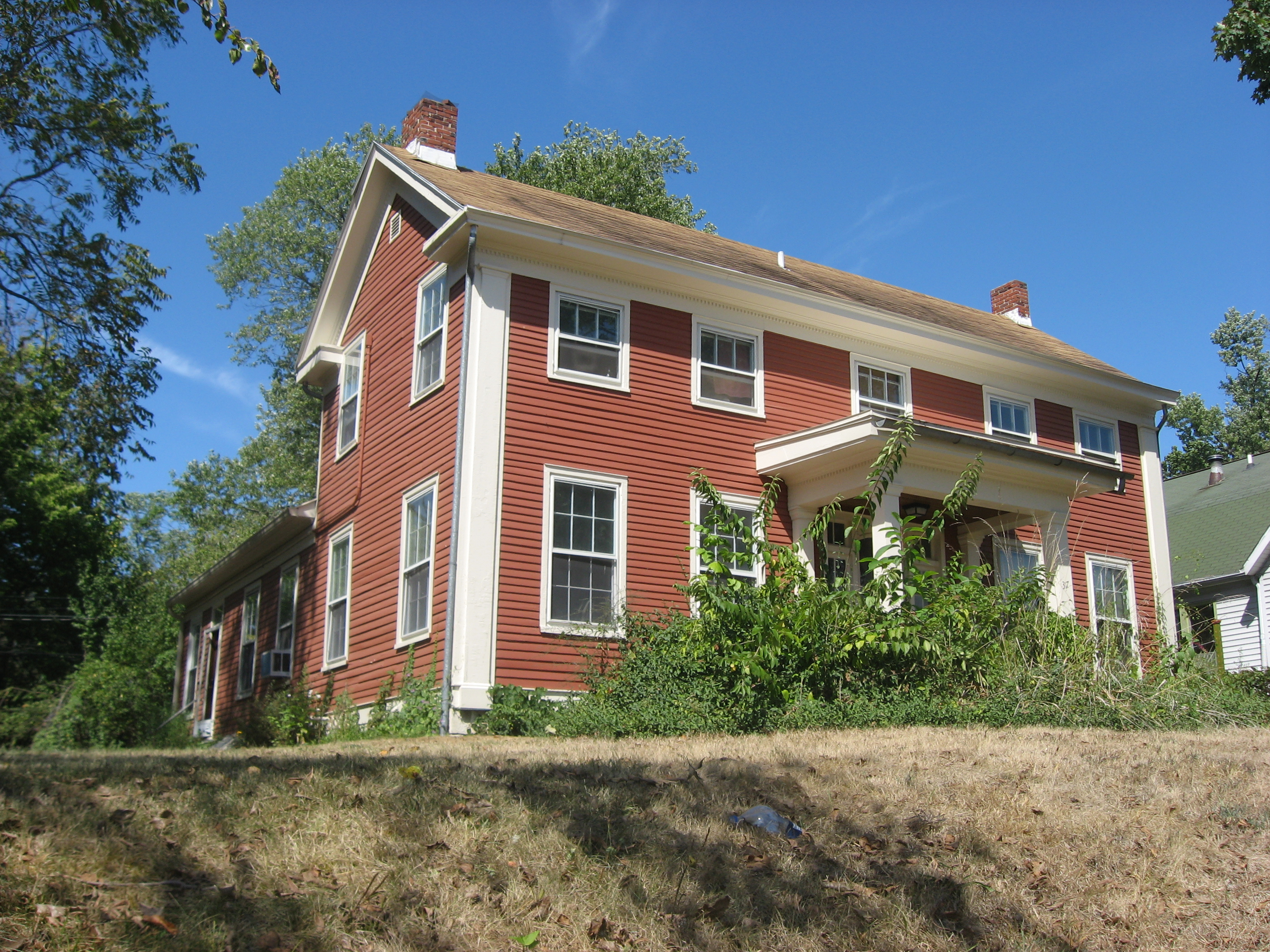
- Front and southern side of the house

- Location within Indiana Location within the United States
- Location: 317 N. Fairview St., Bloomington, Indiana
- Coordinates: 39°10′9″N 86°32′29″W
- Area: less than one acre
- Built: 1845
- Architectural style: Greek Revival
- Part of: Bloomington West Side Historic District (ID97000055)
- NRHP reference No.: 82000023
- Added to NRHP: February 19, 1982

The Elias Abel House is a historic building in western Bloomington, Indiana, United States. Built in the Greek Revival style in 1845, it was once the grand home of one of Bloomington's leading citizens. After many years of use, it fell into disrepair and was endangered by the possibility of destruction, but restoration has led to its designation as a historic site due to its authentic period architecture.

== Elias Abel ==
Born in 1800 in Wythe County, Virginia, Abel moved to the Bloomington vicinity in 1824 and began to farm. At this time, southwestern Indiana was very rural; Bloomington likely had no more than six hundred residents in 1824, but it was the most prosperous town in its region of the state. Between 1841 and 1862, he was active in local politics; he served multiple terms as the Monroe County treasurer, and he was elected to serve in the Indiana General Assembly from 1856 to 1857. After finishing his Bloomington house in 1845, Abel lived on the property until 1856; he had purchased the property for just $250, but he sold it for $1,000. After residing elsewhere for four years, he purchased a nearby house now known as the Blair-Dunning House; in 1862, he sold it to the future wife of Paris C. Dunning, later Governor of Indiana. Into his old age, Abel continued to be both healthy and prominent in the community, keeping his reputation as one of Monroe County's leading Democrats into his mid-eighties.

=== After Abel ===
Following several decades of use as the residence of its owners, the house was converted into a rental property in 1923; it soon began to deteriorate due to a lack of necessary maintenance. During this time, the porch was expanded, the exterior was covered with poor-quality brown asphalt siding, and the original exterior woodwork deteriorated; by the late 1970s, both the original and the later elements were crumbling.

== Architecture ==
=== Structure ===
The structure of the house is typical of the design known as the "I-house" — its two stories are each divided into two rooms, one on each side. Such a plan is typical of the vernacular architecture of Monroe County in the middle of the nineteenth century: the area's early settlers generally favored the "I plan", finding it simple and sufficient for their needs without sacrificing elegance. Few such houses remain in a condition closely resembling their early years; despite the changes made to it, the Abel House has been named Bloomington's best extant "I"-house.

Major structural elements of the house include a pitched roof made of composites and wooden eaves, a large basement with limestone walls and a fruit cellar, and multiple brick chimneys. During its history, the house has received two additions on its western (rear) side: a saltbox-style on the southwestern corner, and a simpler style on the northwestern corner. Individuals may enter the house through a central main entrance; flanked by two windows on each side, the door is surrounded by transoms that may include some original glass.

=== Details ===
The house has been ranked as a fine example of the popular version of the Greek Revival style of architecture. A frame structure two stories tall, the house was built with a small portico at the entrance; when it was later expanded to a large porch, almost all of the original portico was removed. Some original elements survived the modifications of the twentieth century; the most important of these are the pilasters on the corners of the house.

Inside, many more original elements survive than on the exterior. Significant among these are the rail, balusters, and steps of the main staircase, which are made of hand-planed cherry wood, and the mantel over the main fireplace. Other distinctive features include transoms over all interior doorways in the house's southern portion and a walnut log in the attic, which was a traditional element used to bring good luck to the house.

== Recognition ==
A renaissance began for the Abel House in 1976, when the city of Bloomington designated it a historic site, thus preserving it from almost certain demolition; one year later, it was purchased by a couple who soon began to renovate it and applied for loans to aid in restoring it. In 1982, the house was listed on the National Register of Historic Places because of its well-preserved historic architecture; key to its inclusion was its place as the city's best example of an "I"-house and as the home of one of the most prominent residents of early Bloomington. Fifteen years after the house was added to the Register, much of the city's west side was designated a historic district, the Bloomington West Side Historic District; the Abel House was named one of the most important of the district's hundreds of contributing properties.
