= West End School (Louisville, Kentucky) =

Location
- 3628 Virginia Avenue; Louisville, Kentucky 40211; United States
- 38°14′21″N 85°48′50″W

Information
- School type: Boarding school
- Motto: To Be A Man Is To Be Responsible
- Founded: 2005
- Chairman: Dan Hall
- Head of school: Robert Blair
- Grades: Pre-K to 8
- Gender: All male
- Language: English
- Colors: Purple and gold
- Mascot: Soaring Eagles
- Website: www.westendschool.org

The West End School is an academically rigorous, free boarding school in Louisville, Kentucky for boys, grades Pre-K through 8. The school was founded in 2005 by Robert Blair and his wife Debbie. Over the past 16 years they have grown to 140 students. The focus of the school is to help "at risk" boys from the West End neighborhoods of Louisville, Kentucky. It admits incoming sixth-graders who qualify for the free or reduced lunch program and who are capable of doing grade-level work. The West End School Thrives To Offer substantial counseling that support concerns with emotional, behavioral, academic hardships. Provides a small classroom setting to maximize the learning capability for the students. The School is 100% accredited by the Independent School Association of the Central States.

== School history ==
=== Before founding ===
The school is located in the former Virginia Avenue Colored School, Louisville's first purpose-built segregated elementary school, which is listed on the National Register of Historic Places.

=== Founding ===
In 2005, the first year of opening the school, Mr. and Mrs. Blair shared a house on Chestnut Street with three middle school boys and commuted to a single classroom at a dilapidated. When they first opened the school they said wanted to start it as educational experiment with the belief that all children can achieve their highest potential if provided with an education imbued with high expectations, rigorous academics, and a supportive community.

=== Plans for admission of female students ===
Beginning August 2025, West End School plans to admit girls for Pre-K through 2. As time goes on, administration says that they plan to open up the school fully and provide education for girls Pre-K through 8.

== Student life ==
Under Robert Blair as the head of school and Dan Hall as the chairman of the school's board of directors, West End School is run like a traditional boarding school. The boys must get up each day at 6:45 and lights out is at 9:30. Also West End School offers housing to alumni attending high school, who benefit from living in our supportive and structured campus. The last school year there were 5 alumni students.

=== Optional student educational programs ===
The school has school enrichment program for kids that are in pre-k and up. Students also have an option to participate in a 4-week summer program which includes academic courses, enrichment activities and travel opportunities which help to prevent "summer learning loss" between changing grades.
