= J. Wood Wilson House =

Historic house in Indiana, United States

- U.S. National Register of Historic Places
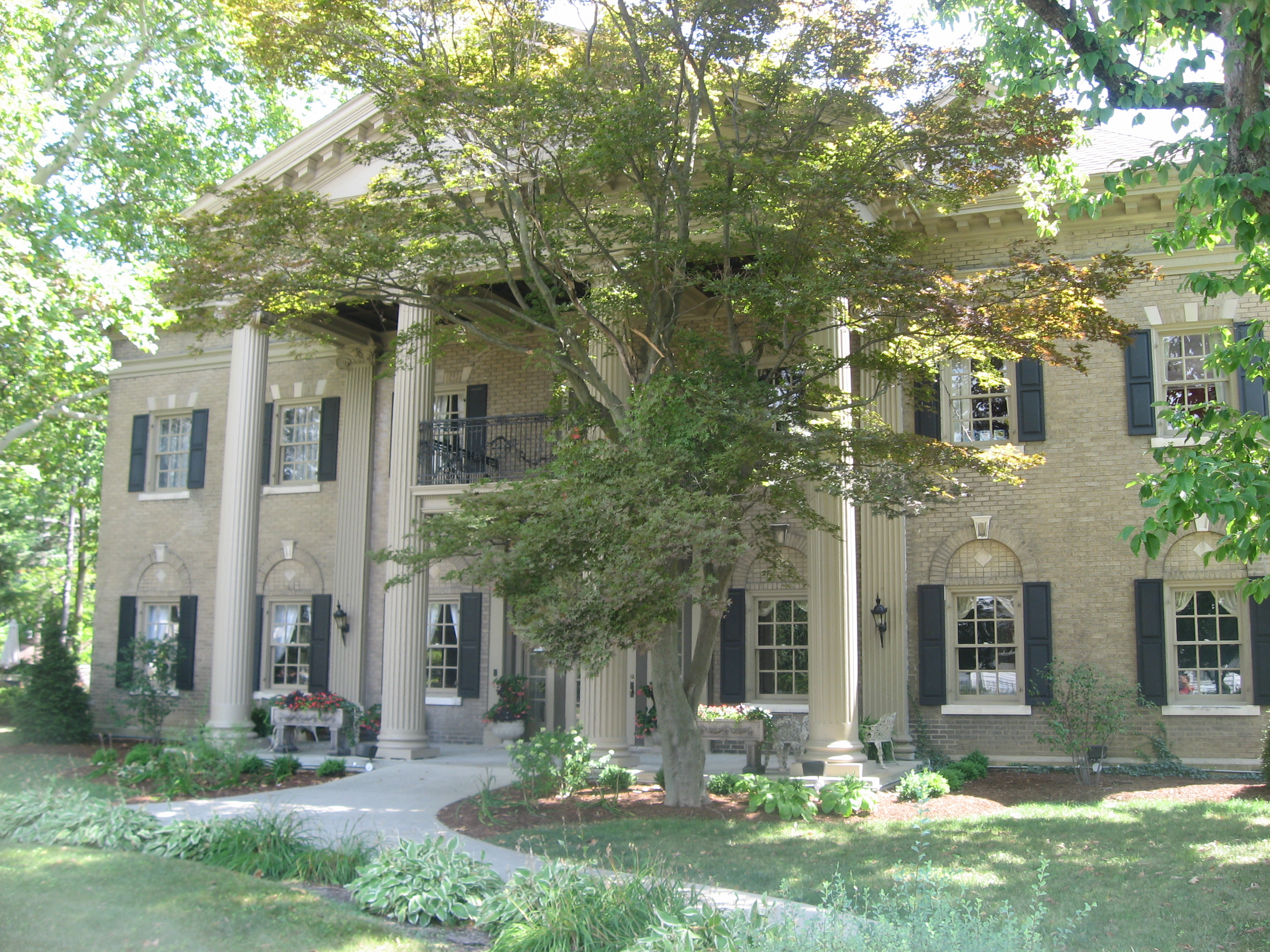
- J. Wood Wilson House, July 2012

- Location within Indiana Location within the United States
- Location: 723 W. Fourth St., Marion, Indiana
- Coordinates: 40°33′27″N 85°40′13″W
- Area: less than one acre
- Built: 1912
- Architect: Plato, Samuel M.
- Architectural style: Colonial Revival, Georgian Revival
- NRHP reference No.: 88001218
- Added to NRHP: August 11, 1988

J. Wood Wilson House, also known as the Wilson-Vaughan House and Hostess House, is a historic home located at Marion, Indiana. It was built in 1912, and is a 2 1/2-story, rectangular, Colonial Revival / Georgian Revival style brick dwelling. The front facade features a projecting portico with Ionic order columns and balcony with a decorative iron railing. It was designed by noted African-American architect Samuel Plato (1882–1957).

It was listed on the National Register of Historic Places in 1988.
