= Bloomington freight station =

- Illinois Central Railroad Freight Depot
- U.S. National Register of Historic Places
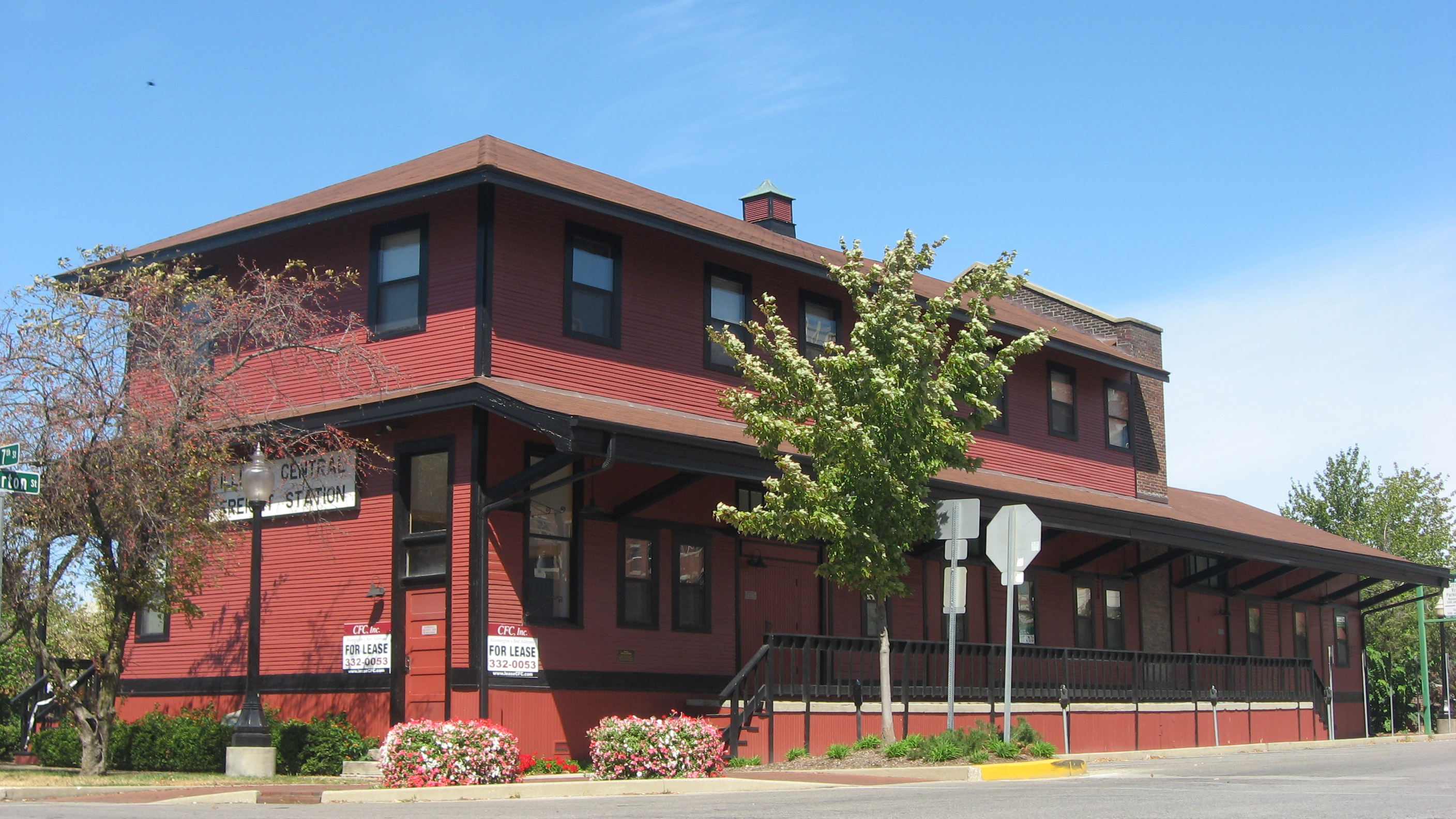
- Front and southern end

- Location within Indiana Location within the United States
- Location: 301 N. Morton St., Bloomington, Indiana
- Coordinates: 39°10′7″N 86°32′11″W
- Area: Less than 1 acre (0.40 ha)
- Built: 1906
- Architect: Illinois Central Railroad staff architects
- Architectural style: Functional Industrial
- NRHP reference No.: 83000113
- Added to NRHP: June 23, 1983

The Bloomington freight station is a historic train station in downtown Bloomington, Indiana, United States. Constructed in the early twentieth century, it has endured closure and a series of modifications to survive to the present day, and it has been declared a historic site. Used only occasionally for many years, it is one of the most important buildings in a large historic district on the city's west side.

== History ==
By the 1890s, the Monon Railroad was serving Bloomington and operating maintenance shops on the city's southern side. In 1902, desiring service from a second railroad, Bloomington and Perry Townships offered a large cash bonus to whichever company would add a second rail line in the city. Four years later, Illinois Central Railroad took up the offer, and upon finishing its route into the city, it decided to erect a station dedicated to freight traffic. Designed by the railroad's staff architects, it is a simple building without unneeded elements; its architecture was determined by the features that the railroad needed to operate a train station. From its earliest years, the depot played an important part in the development of Bloomington's heavy industries: many limestone mills and the large Showers Brothers furniture factory were located in its immediate vicinity.

At the time of construction, the depot was a simple rectangle, 163 feet (50 m) long and 35 feet (11 m) wide. It was greatly expanded in 1922 by the addition of a second story to much of the building. The northernmost portion of the building was removed in 1959, because falling freight traffic no longer required such a large building. After closing in 1963, the depot became a bar and grill restaurant; the restaurant later closed, leaving the building vacant, although another restaurant, Macri's at the Depot, opened inside by 2012. The building is currently used as office space by a private company.

== Architecture ==
The depot is a rectangular wooden building that rests on a foundation of concrete. Because the building's primary purpose was the transfer of goods between wagons and railroad cars, the ground floor is elevated above the street by about 3 feet (0.91 m). When the depot was constructed, it measured 35 feet (11 m) from east to west, and 163 feet (50 m) from north to south, although the 1959 modification reduced the building to only 109 feet (33 m) long. Its exterior displays simple clapboarding, and the building is covered with a shallow-pitched gable roof of asphalt shingles. On both the street side and the rail side of the building (east and west respectively), the roof extends approximately 7.5 feet (2.3 m) past the edge of the building, in order to shelter the loading and unloading zones. This portion of the roof is one of the more distinctive sections of the depot from an architectural point of view: the rafters and braces were left uncovered at the overhangs. Large doors provide access to the large freight-handling rooms of the interior, which are lit by a combination of windows and skylights. The southern end of the station includes office space and a waiting room for businessmen. The roofline was altered by the expansion: a hip roof was created over the new second story, but the original first-story overhang for the loading zones was preserved.

As a freight depot rather than a passenger station, the depot was built exclusively with efficiency in mind. No unnecessary decorations can be found on the structure, and it was built according to a generic design by the railroad's staff architects rather than being a unique production by local craftsmen or architects. Consequently, the station lacks a distinctive architectural style. Aside from the expansion in 1922 and the reduction in 1959, no substantial modifications have been made to the original design.

== Preservation ==
In 1983, the building was listed on the National Register of Historic Places as the "Illinois Central Railroad Freight Depot", qualifying because of its place in local history. Its significance depended on the role it played for the city's furniture and limestone industries.

Much of Bloomington's near west side was designated a historic district and listed on the National Register in 1997. Known as the Bloomington West Side Historic District, it encompasses approximately four hundred historic buildings, including the Illinois Central Depot. The depot was deemed one of the leading components of the district, due largely to its place as the sole railroad-related building within the district: the Illinois Central built multiple train stations, engine houses, and turntables near the district's eastern edge, but only the freight depot remained by 1987.
