= Bloomington Township, Monroe County, Indiana =

Bloomington Township
- Township
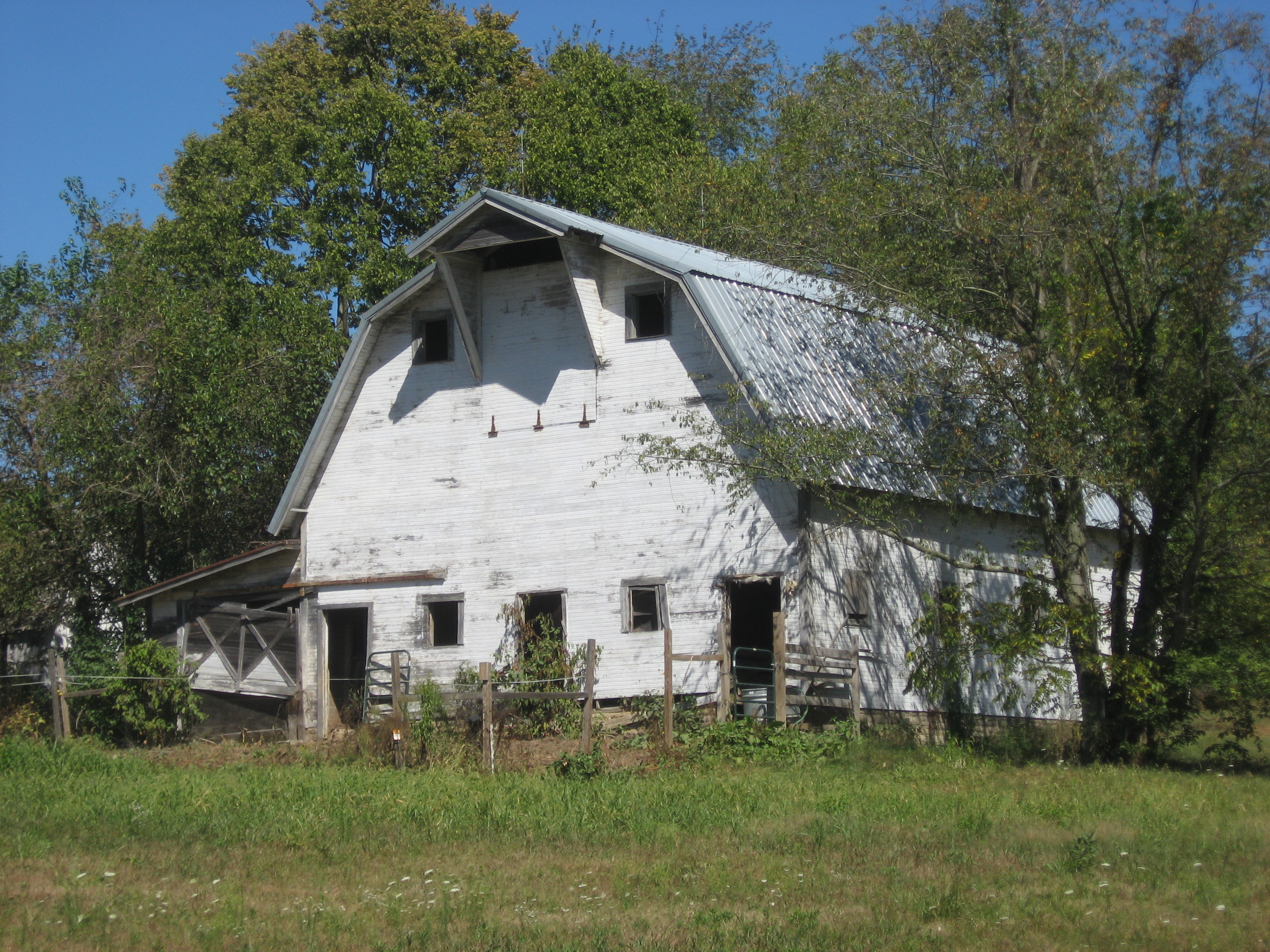
- A barn along Maple Grove Road in the township

- Location in Monroe County
- Coordinates: 39°12′25″N 86°31′10″W
- Country: United States
- State: Indiana
- County: Monroe

Government
  - Type: Indiana township

Area
  - Total: 36.8 sq mi (95 km^{2})
  - Land: 36.61 sq mi (94.8 km^{2})
  - Water: 0.19 sq mi (0.49 km^{2}) 0.52%
- Elevation: 748 ft (228 m)

Population (2020)
  - Total: 42,238
  - Density: 1,206.4/sq mi (465.8/km^{2})
- Time zone: UTC-5 (Eastern (EST))
  - Summer (DST): UTC-4 (EDT)
- ZIP codes: 47401, 47404, 47406, 47408
- Area codes: 812, 930
- GNIS feature ID: 453115
- Website: www.bloomingtontownship.in.gov

Bloomington Township is one of eleven townships in Monroe County, Indiana, United States. As of the 2010 census, its population was 44,167 and it contained 15,346 housing units.

== History ==
Maple Grove Road Rural Historic District and Daniel Stout House are listed on the National Register of Historic Places.

== Geography ==
According to the 2010 census, the township has a total area of 36.8 square miles (95 km^{2}), of which 36.61 square miles (94.8 km^{2}) (or 99.48%) is land and 0.19 square miles (0.49 km^{2}) (or 0.52%) is water.

=== Cities, towns, villages ===
- Bloomington (northern half, from Third Street north)

=== Unincorporated towns ===
- Arlington at 39.183936°N 86.549998°W
- Cascade at 39.190603°N 86.538886°W
- Dolan at 39.240325°N 86.499163°W
- Eastern Heights at 39.17477°N 86.480273°W
- Lancaster Park at 39.210324°N 86.560832°W

(This list is based on USGS data and may include former settlements.)

=== Cemeteries ===
The township contains these two cemeteries: Rose Hill and Valhalla Memory Gardens.

=== Major highways ===
- Interstate 69
- Indiana State Road 37
- Indiana State Road 46

=== Lakes ===
- Griffy Lake
- University Lake

== School districts ==
- Monroe County Community School Corporation

== Political districts ==
- Indiana's 9th congressional district
- State House District 61
- State Senate District 40
