= Matthews Stone Company Historic District =

Historic district in Indiana, United States

- U.S. National Register of Historic Places
- U.S. Historic district
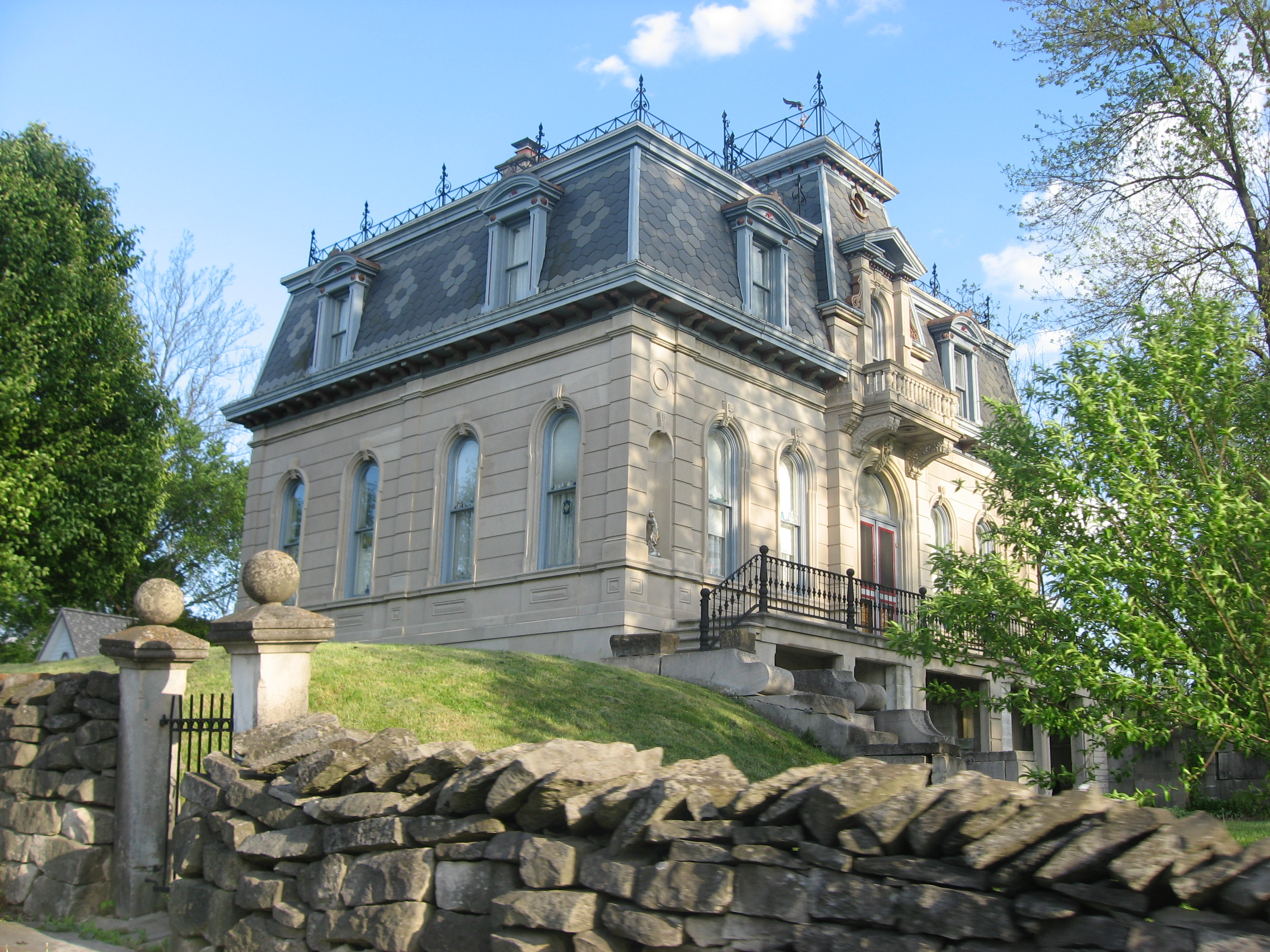
- Matthews Mansion April 2012

- Location within Indiana Location within the United States
- Location: 6293 N. Matthews Dr. and 6445 W. Maple Grove Rd., north of Ellettsville in Richland Township, Monroe County, Indiana
- Coordinates: 39°14′42″N 86°37′10″W
- Area: 45.61 acres (18.46 ha)
- Architect: Nichols, John L.
- Architectural style: Second Empire, Tudor Revival
- NRHP reference No.: 13000725
- Added to NRHP: September 18, 2013

Matthews Stone Company Historic District is a national historic district located in Richland Township, Monroe County, Indiana. The district encompasses five contributing buildings, one contributing site, six contributing structures, and two contributing objects associated with the Matthews Brothers Stone Company limestone business, now operated as Bybee Stone Company, Inc. The district developed between about 1862 and 1962, and include notable examples of Second Empire and Tudor Revival style architecture. The contributing resources include the Matthews Mansion (a.k.a. Graymont, 1880), Company Store Building (c. 1874), Primary Mill Building (1908), Drafting Building (1920), Administration Building (c. 1931), and two pump houses (c. 1935, c. 1955).

It was listed on the National Register of Historic Places in 2013.
