= Ellettsville Downtown Historic District =

Historic district in Indiana, United States

- U.S. National Register of Historic Places
- U.S. Historic district
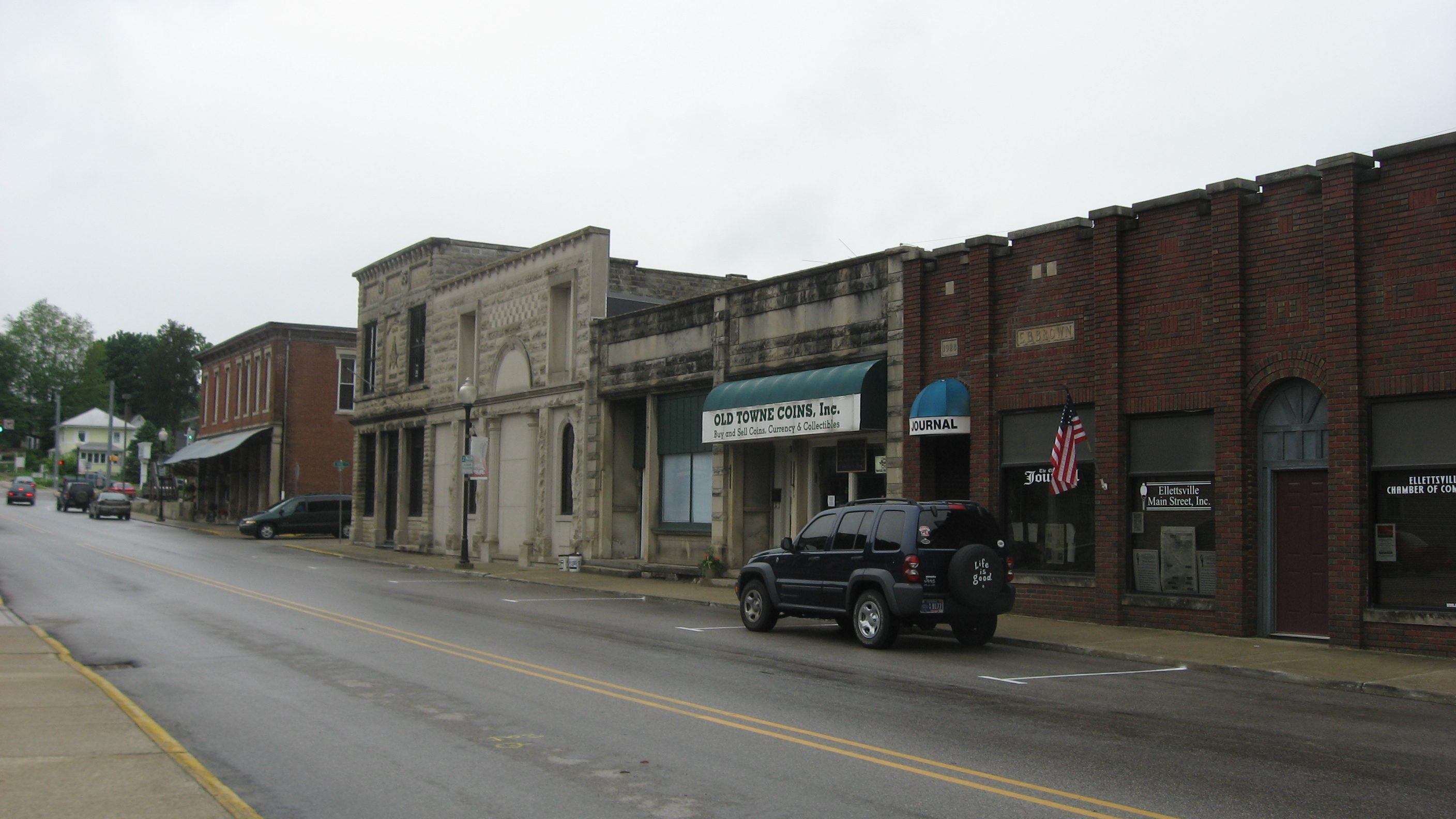
- Downtown Ellettsville, May 2010

- Location within Indiana Location within the United States
- Location: Roughly bounded by Main, Sale, Walnut and Association Sts., Ellettsville, Indiana
- Coordinates: 39°14′18″N 86°37′29″W
- Area: 20.8 acres (8.4 ha)
- Architect: Fletcher, George W.; et.al.
- Architectural style: Early Commercial, Queen Anne
- NRHP reference No.: 06000849
- Added to NRHP: September 20, 2006

Ellettsville Downtown Historic District is a national historic district located at Ellettsville, Indiana. The district encompasses 50 contributing buildings in the central business district and surrounding residential sections of Ellettsville. It developed between about 1840 and 1953, and includes notable examples of Queen Anne, Early Commercial, Gothic Revival, and Bungalow/American Craftsman style architecture. Notable buildings include the Robert Stimson House (c. 1840), May Presley House (C. 1850), Bradford House (c. 1878), George W. Fletcher House (c. 1875), Wickens House (1909), Capt. Gilbert Perry House (c. 1890), I.O.O.F. Building (c. 1885), Town Hall (1927), Masonic Building (1895), Knights of Pythias Building (c. 1895), First United Methodist Church (1900), and First Baptist Church (1909).

It was listed on the National Register of Historic Places in 2006.
