= Richland-Bean Blossom Community School Corporation =

School district in Monroe County, Indiana, US

Richland-Bean Blossom Community School Corporation Edgewood Schools
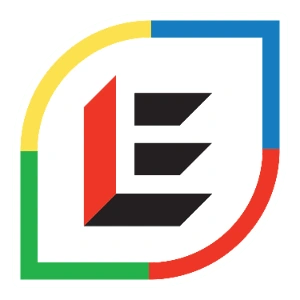

Address
- 600 S Edgewood Dr Southern IndianaGeography of Indiana Elletsville, Indiana, 47429; United States

District information
- Type: School district Corporation
- Motto: Caring. Daring. Preparing.
- Grades: PK-12
- Superintendent: Dr. Jerry Sanders
- Chair of the board: Dana Robert Kerr
- Schools: 5
- District ID: 1809480

Students and staff
- Students: 2,702
- Athletic conference: Western Indiana Conference
- District mascot: Mustang
- Colors: Red and black

Other information
- Website: rbbschools.net

Richland-Bean Blossom Community School Corporation (RBB) is a public school corporation located in northwestern Monroe County, Indiana, USA. RBB and Monroe County Community School Corporation are the only two school corporations serving the county. RBB serves Ellettsville, Stinesville, Beanblossom Township, and Richland Township. The Richland-Bean Blossom Metropolitan School District was formed in 1963 and became the Richland-Bean Blossom Community School Corporation in 1965. The district is accredited by AdvancED.

The district's budget for 2021 was $28.8 million; a $47,121 loss was expected, but it would not impact RBB until the 2024–25 academic year. In 2021, results from the ILEARN test, a standardized exam introduced to the district in 2019, showed that only 31.7% of students were proficient in both math and English, though the value of these statistics were questioned due to the pandemic's effect on learning.

== High schools ==
=== Edgewood High School (9–12) ===
Edgewood High School (EHS) in Elletsville was founded in 1964 when Stinesville and Ellettsville high schools were consolidated. School enrollment for the 2019–2020 academic year was 770; 92% of students are white. The EHS Mustangs participate in the Western Indiana Conference for football, golf, sideline cheer, soccer, volleyball, cross-country, basketball, dance, wrestling, swimming, gymnastics, baseball, softball, tennis, track, and lacrosse. Non-athletic student organizations include AESOP Magazine, Academic Super Bowl (1997 State Champions in math, English, social studies, fine arts, and interdisciplinary studies), GSA, Key Club, National Honor Society, and Spanish Club. Their theatre arts group is called the Masqued Crafters. The Marching Mustangs were first in the 2018 Open Class C Indiana State School Music Association competition and placed second the following year. Dirk Ackerman was the principal for the 2021–2022 academic school year.

== Middle schools ==
=== Edgewood Junior High School (6–8) ===
Edgewood Junior High School (EJHS) in Ellettsville opened in 1969 in a brand-new building and offers grades six, seven, and eight. 618 students attend EJHS, 92% of which are white. Students can participate in cross country, football, volleyball, tennis, basketball, swimming and diving, wrestling, track and field, baseball, and softball. Jonathan Siegelin was the principal for the 2020–2021 academic year. They have two choirs: Mini Warehouse and the girls' group Sophisticates.

== Elementary schools ==
=== Edgewood Intermediate School (3–5) ===
Edgewood Intermediate School (EIS) is in Ellettsville and serves grades 3–5. 632 were enrolled for the 2019–2020 academic year, 89% of which were white. In 2008, EIS won the state's Outdoor Lab of the Year recognition and was recertified as a STEM school by the Indiana Department of Education in 2021. Jennifer Lee was the principal for the 2020–2021 academic year. The mascot for EIS is an eagle.

=== Edgewood Primary School (K–2) ===
Edgewood Primary School (EPS) is located in Ellettsville, offers pre-kindergarten through second grade, and has an enrollment of 581, 92% of which are white. EPS' mascot is the pony. Brenda Whitaker was the principal for the 2020–2021 academic year. In 2021, EPS was recertified by the Indiana Department of Education as a STEM school.

== Other schools ==
=== Edgewood Early Childhood Center (PK) ===
Edgewood Early Childhood Center (EECC) is a level 3 Paths to QUALITY school, a rating given by the state, located in Ellettsville. The school has started working towards a level four rating, which would involve being nationally accredited by the National Association for the Education of Young Children. The preschool coordinator for 2020-2021 was Matt Wooden.

=== Edge Alternative School ===
Edge Alternative School (EAS) offers students who did not have the opportunity to graduate on time due to any variety of obstacles a chance to earn high school credit. It is considered a dropout prevention program.

=== Forest Hills Special Education Cooperative ===
Forest Hills Special Education Cooperative in Ellettsville is a collaborative special education program between RBB and Spencer-Owen Community Schools.

== Former schools ==
=== Ellettsville Elementary ===
Ellettsville Elementary closed unceremoniously in the early 2000s despite being one of the state's largest elementary schools in 1993 and became a commercial space known as Eagle's Landing. In 2016, Seven Oaks Classical School, a public charter, moved into the building as part of a multi-stage expansion plan.

=== Stinesville Elementary ===
Due to decreasing enrollment numbers and increasing repair costs, RBB voted to close Stinesville Elementary School at the end of the 2017–2018 academic year despite community protests. In 2019, the district sold the vacant building to the town council for $1.
