= Edgewood High School (Indiana) =

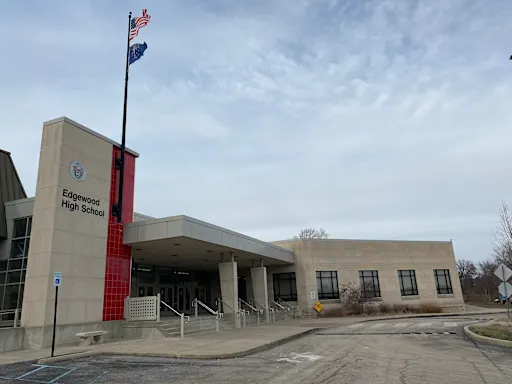

Location
- 601 South Edgewood Drive; Ellettsville, Indiana 47429; United States; 39°14′9″N 86°37′59″W

Information
- Type: Public high school
- Established: 1964
- School district: Richland-Bean Blossom Community School Corporation
- Principal: Robert Boltinghouse
- Teaching staff: 57.00 (on an FTE basis)
- Grades: 9–12
- Enrollment: 777 (as of 2025-2026)
- Student to teacher ratio: 13.37
- Color
- Athletics conference: Western Indiana Conference
- Team name: Mustangs
- Website: ehs.rbbschools.net

Edgewood High School is located in Ellettsville, Indiana, United States. It is the sole high school in the Richland-Bean Blossom Community School Corporation and opened in 1965, shortly after the school district consolidated Ellettsville and Stinesville schools.

== Demographics ==
As of the 2014–15 school year, the school had an enrollment of 819 students and 46.0 classroom teachers (on an FTE basis), for a student–teacher ratio of 17.8:1. There were 193 students (23.6% of enrollment) eligible for free lunch and 43 (5.3% of students) eligible for reduced-cost lunch.

The demographic breakdown of the 748 students enrolled in 2012-2013 was:

- Male - 52.3%
- Female - 47.7%
- Native American/Alaskan - 0.1%
- Asian/Pacific islanders - 1.2%
- Black - 1.3%
- Hispanic - 2.4%
- White - 92.0%
- Multiracial - 3.0%

Additionally, 27.9% of the students were eligible for free or reduced price lunch.

== Athletics ==
The Edgewood Mustangs compete in the Western Indiana Conference of the Indiana High School Athletic Association (IHSAA). The school colors are black, red and white. Currently offered boys' sports are cross country, football, soccer, tennis, basketball, swimming, wrestling, baseball, golf, and track. Currently offered girls' sports are cross country, golf, soccer, volleyball, basketball, swimming, softball, tennis, track and wrestling.

== Marching band ==
The Marching Mustangs placed first in the 2018 Open Class C Indiana State School Music Association (ISSMA) competition with their show "From the Ashes." They also placed second in the 2019 Open Class C ISSMA competition with their show "The Space Between" and third with "Out of the Woods" in 2021." In 2022 the Marching Mustangs placed first in the Open Class C ISSMA competition with their show "Break Free," and in 2023 they did so again with their show "On Your Spot." In 2024 the Marching Mustangs made history being the second marching band in ISSMA Class C to place 1st three years in a row, they won with their show "Skewed Perspective"

== Notable alumni ==
- Mark Slessinger (class of 1992), head men's basketball coach at the University of New Orleans since 2011

== Choral program ==
Edgewood High School offers four different choirs. Music Warehouse (mixed), Sophisticated Ladies (univoice), New Edition (mixed) and Noteworthy (mixed). Music Warehouse, Sophisticated Ladies, and New Edition are all show choirs, while Noteworthy is a concert choir. Edgewood hosts an annual show choir competition titled Competition of Champions (COC).

=== Music Warehouse ===
Music Warehouse, Edgewood High School's varsity-level mixed group, is composed of 44 singer-dancers. It was founded in the 1975–76 school year.

Over the course of five decades, Music Warehouse has performed and competed across the United States.

=== Sophisticated Ladies ===
Edgewood High School's varsity-level unisex choir has 44 singer-dancers, and has been performing for over three decades.

=== New Edition ===
Edgewood High School's junior varsity-level mixed choir, New Edition, is composed of 22 singer-dancers.

=== Noteworthy ===
This is Edgewood High School's concert choir ensemble. They perform in a number of concerts and community events throughout the school year, as well as the high school's annual holiday production, 'Tis The Season. Noteworthy performs a library of repertoire ranging from Broadway show tunes to sacred concert pieces.
