= Richland Township, Monroe County, Indiana =

Richland Township
- Township
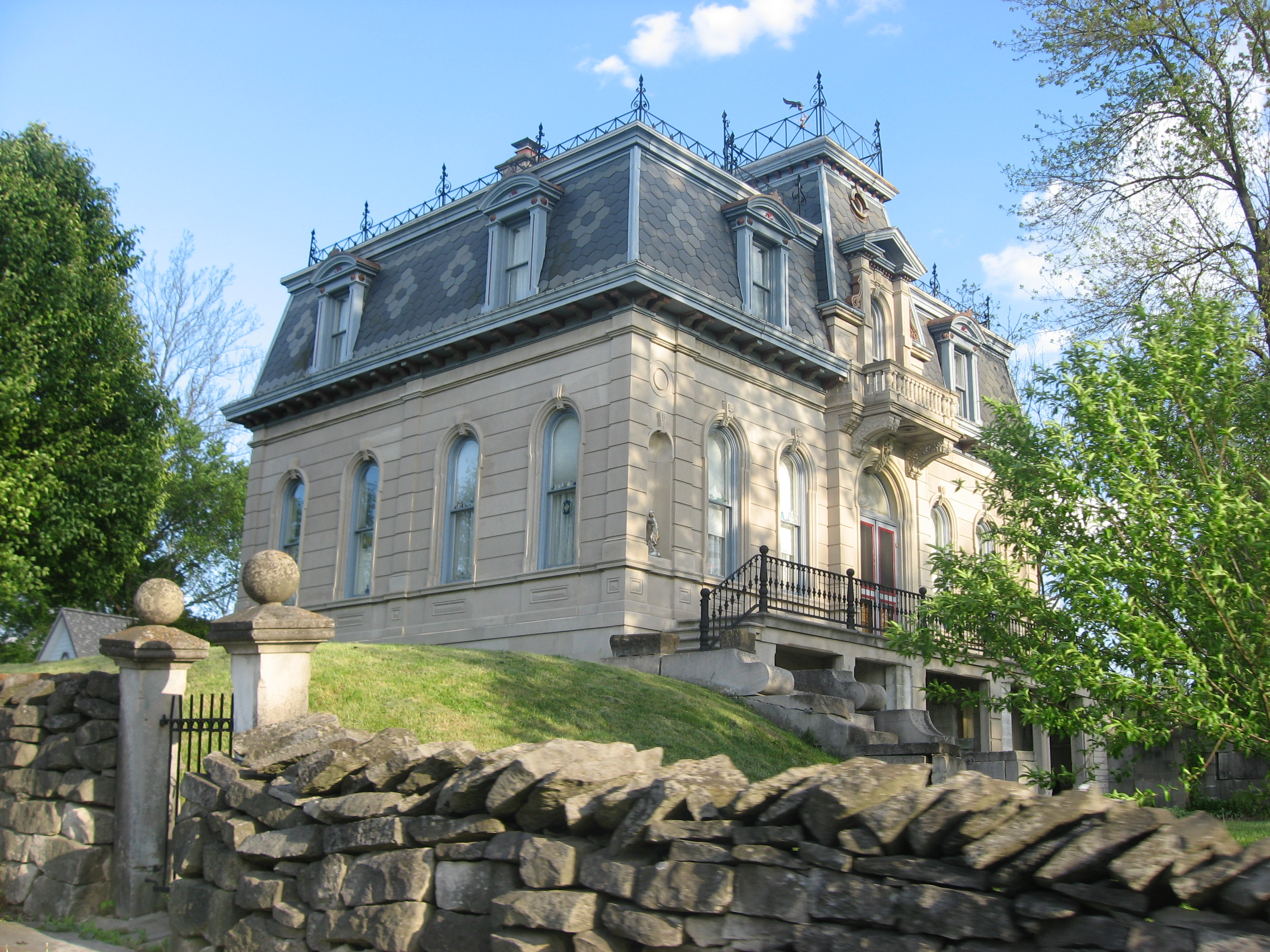
- The Matthews Mansion, located in the northern part of the township

- Location in Monroe County
- Coordinates: 39°12′53″N 86°37′38″W
- Country: United States
- State: Indiana
- County: Monroe

Government
  - Type: Indiana township

Area
  - Total: 35.44 sq mi (91.8 km^{2})
  - Land: 35.44 sq mi (91.8 km^{2})
  - Water: 0 sq mi (0 km^{2}) 0%
- Elevation: 810 ft (247 m)

Population (2020)
  - Total: 15,098
  - Density: 404.8/sq mi (156.3/km^{2})
- Time zone: UTC-5 (Eastern (EST))
  - Summer (DST): UTC-4 (EDT)
- ZIP codes: 47404, 47429, 47433, 47460
- Area codes: 812, 930
- GNIS feature ID: 453798
- Website: richlandtownshiptrustee.org

Richland Township is one of eleven townships in Monroe County, Indiana, United States. As of the 2020 census, its population was 15,098, and it contained 6,455 housing units.

== History ==
Richland Township was established in 1829.

Ennis Archaeological Site, Maple Grove Road Rural Historic District, Matthews Stone Company Historic District, and Leroy Mayfield House are listed on the National Register of Historic Places.

== Geography ==
According to the 2020 census, the township has a total area of 35.44 square miles (91.8 km^{2}) land.

=== Cities, towns, and villages ===
- Bloomington (west edge)
- Ellettsville (vast majority)

=== Unincorporated towns ===
- Forest Park Heights at 39.209491°N 86.588610°W

(This list is based on USGS data and may include former settlements.)

=== Cemeteries ===
The township contains these three cemeteries: Coffey, Dowell, Richland, and Whitehall.

=== Major highways ===
- Indiana State Road 46
- Indiana State Road 48

== School districts ==
- Richland-Bean Blossom Community School Corporation

== Political districts ==
- Indiana's 9th congressional district
- State House District 46
- State Senate District 40
