= Bloomington Academy =

Public high school in Bloomington, Indiana, US

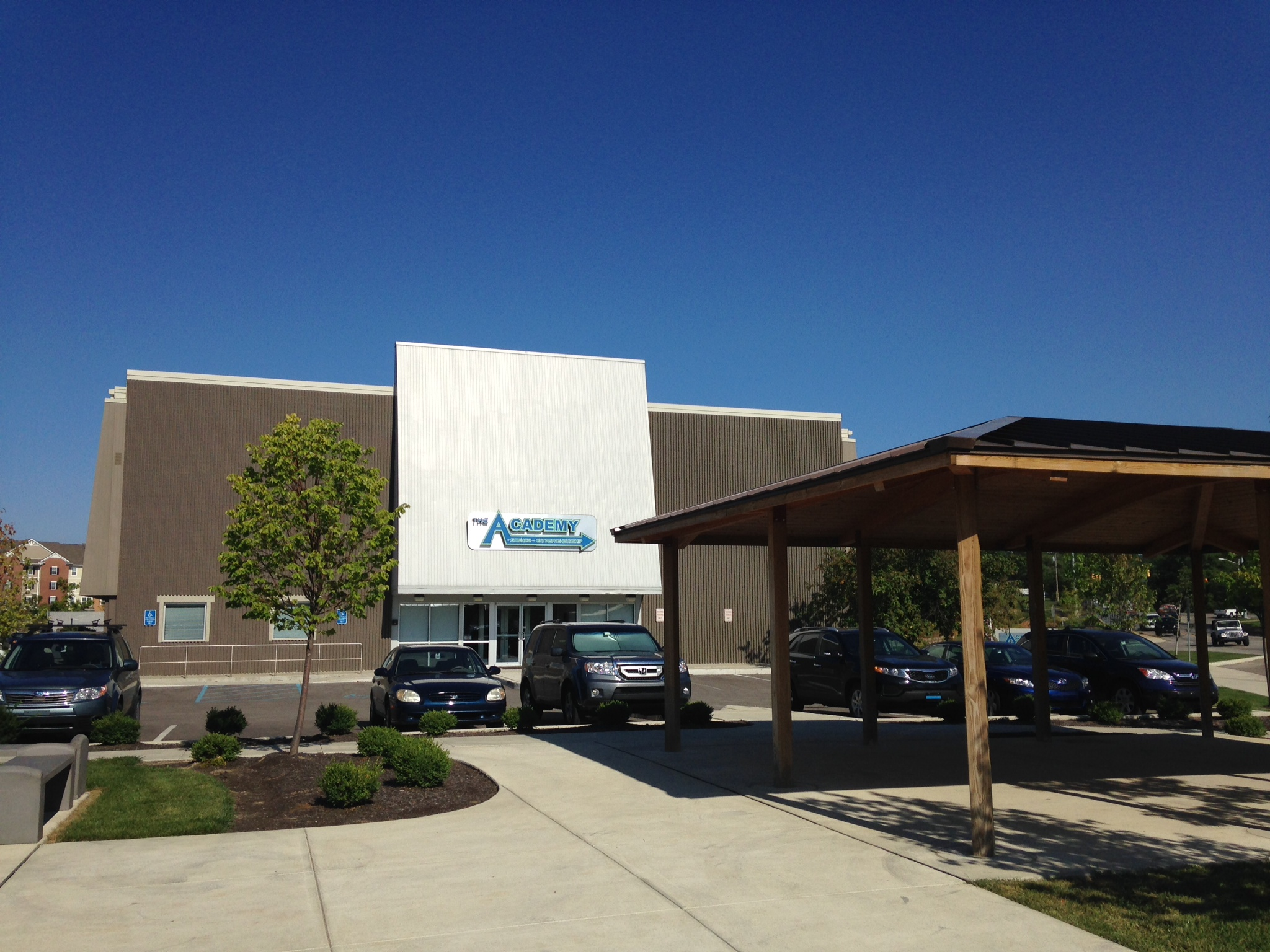

Location
- 444 S. Patterson; Bloomington, Indiana 47403; United States
- 39.163051°N 86.551516°W

Information
- Other names: The Academy
- Former names: The Academy of Science and Entrepreneurship • New Tech High School
- Type: Public High school
- Motto: Trust, Respect, Responsibility
- School district: Monroe County Community School Corporation
- NCES School ID: 180063002467
- Principal: Angela Evans
- Teaching staff: 11.50 (FTE)
- Grades: 9-12
- Enrollment: 86 (2023–2024)
- Student to teacher ratio: 7.48
- Colour
- Slogan: Join the pack!
- Mascot: Wolfpack
- Website: ase.mccsc.edu

Bloomington Academy (previously named "The Academy of Science and Entrepreneurship" and "Bloomington New Tech High School") is a high school in Bloomington, Indiana, United States which utilizes Project Based Learning. It is a part of the Monroe County Community School Corporation. The Academy opened in fall 2008 with a class size of 96 students, the school serves students in 9th–12th grades, and at the beginning, added a class each year, with up to 100 students per grade. In May 2009, the class of 2012 had 50–65 students, and 58 Students graduated in the class of 2012. The school has a 1:1 student to computer ratio. While this was remarkable at the creation of the school it has since become the standard across MCCSC.

== History ==
Bloomington Academy in Bloomington, Indiana is part of the larger New Tech Network, which includes over 100 schools across the United States. The school is funded through district funds, state grants, and community donations. The Bloomington Academy building was originally the Rogers Building Supplies main building. It was renovated to become a school. In 2018, Bloomington Academy received STEM certification by the Indiana Department of Education. Bloomington Academy received Early College High School certification during the 2022–2023 academic year.

== Rebrand ==
Bloomington Academy has undergone two separate rebrands. The first was in 2014 when it changed from New Tech High School to The Academy of Science and Entrepreneurship. The second was in 2024 when it changed to Bloomington Academy. In 2023, the mascot, the Wolfpack, was chosen.

Multiple designers have been involved in the 2024 rebrand process.

== Campus ==
Bloomington Academy is located on the near west side of Bloomington, off of Patterson St. Both the school campus and the surrounding area have seen a host of improvements over the past few years. In the summer of 2013, major work was done on the school campus, adding a number of features including new signage, landscaping, a new parking lot, a picnic shelter and outdoor benches, and a basketball court. During the 2013–14 school year, the "Green Pioneers" group (with help from the community) installed a rain garden to capture the runoff from the school roof, and reduce the amount of stormwater that went into the city sewers.

== Curriculum ==
New Tech uses project-based learning to engage students in relevant and meaningful work. Much of the classwork is done on computers. The school uses Instructure's Canvas and Gmail/Google Drive for assignment management, grades, and collaboration. Prior to the use of Canvas, New Technology Foundation's Echo Collaborative Learning Environment was used. In the first year, before echo was finalized, the American Studies class used the Moodle virtual learning environment.

The following classes were available in 2022:

- American Studies - a combination of American History and English 9.
- Global Perspectives - a combination of World History and English 10.
- English 11
- English 12
- Software Technology & Success Skills - teaches students software applications (mainly from Microsoft) and skills that help students get jobs.
- Biology & Health
- Environmental Science
- Botany
- Zoology
- Epidemiology
- Chemistry
- Physics
- PLTW Intro to Engineering & Design
- PLTW Principles Of Engineering
- PLTW Civil Engineering & Architecture
- PLTW Principles of Biomedical Sciences
- PLTW Human Body Systems
- Math Core
- Algebra II
- Pre Calculus/Trigonometry
- Entrepreneurship - This class has 2 options either create a personalized business or run the school store
- Spanish: Levels 1–3
- Art - This class can be taken as a Dual Credit Course, earning both High School and Ivy Tech credit.
- Government
- Economics
- Service Learning Classes (Teaching Assistants, Recycling, etc.)
- IVYT111 - An Ivy Tech class taught on-site at ASE.
- English 111
- Ivy Tech Release - Allows students to take classes on the local Ivy Tech campus.
- Film as Literature
- Dramatic Literature
- Physical Education

== Extracurricular activities ==
Many extracurricular activities are available at Bloomington Academy including but not limited to:

- National Honor Society
- Spanish Club (Currently inactive)
- Space Club(Paused due to covid, never resumed)
- Robotics Club(Paused due to covid, never resumed)
- Student Leadership Team
- The Academy Theater Company (Currently inactive)
- Chess Club
- Art Club (Currently inactive)
- Environmental Club (Currently inactive)
- Dance Club (Currently inactive)
- The Academy Academic Team
- E-Sports
- Pride and Progress Club

Students may also participate in the activities of their "home school". Many Academy students have been in band, theater, or on sports teams at Bloomington North or South.
