= Maple Grove Road Rural Historic District =

Historic district in Indiana, United States

- U.S. National Register of Historic Places
- U.S. Historic district
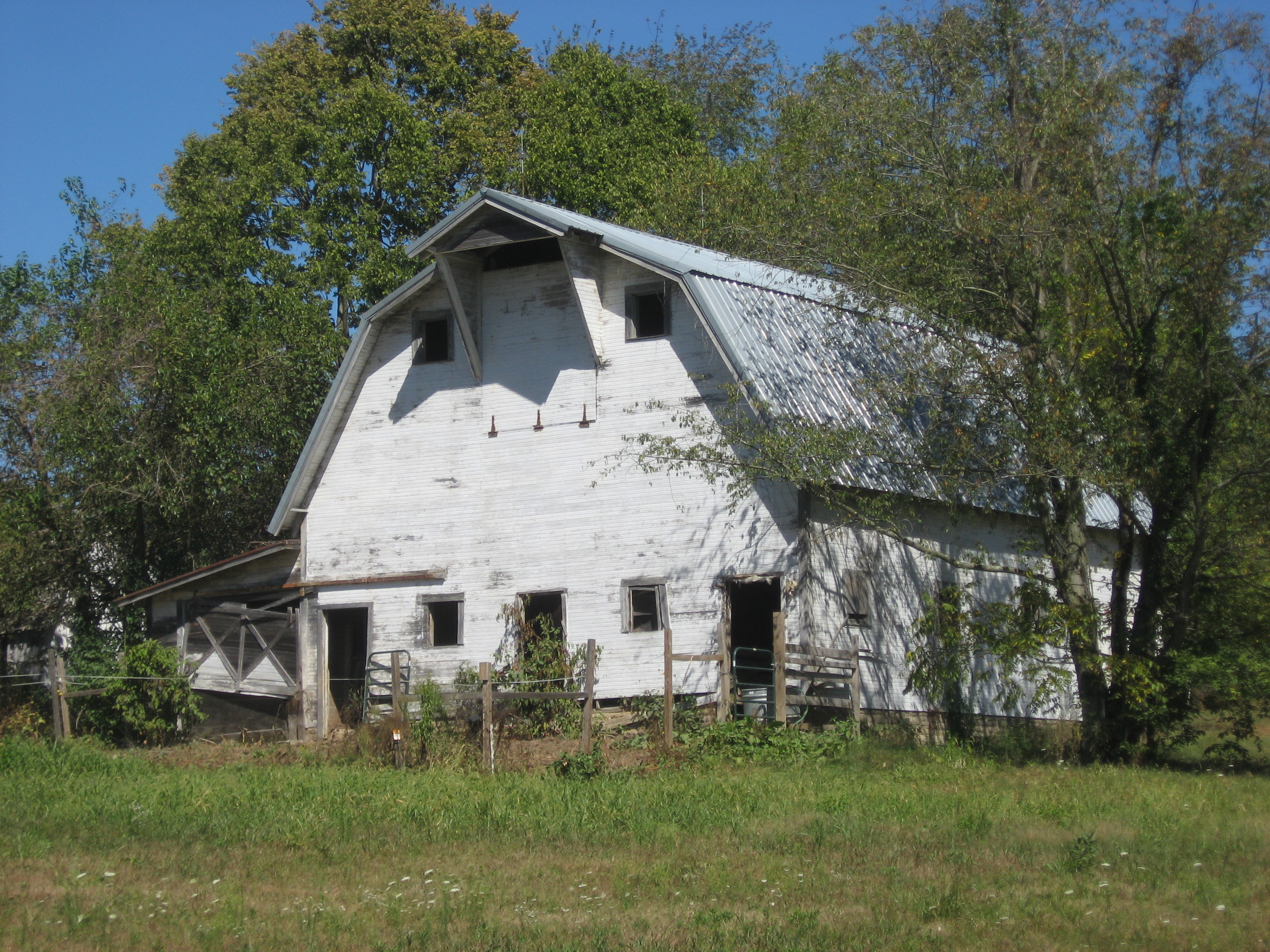
- White barn along Maple Grove Road, September 2010

- Location within Indiana Location within the United States
- Location: Roughly Maple Grove Rd. from Beanblossom Creek to State Road 46 northwest of Bloomington, including the eastern half of the Lancaster Park subdivision, Bloomington Township and Richland Township, Monroe County, Indiana
- Coordinates: 39°13′19″N 86°33′46″W
- Area: 600 acres (240 ha)
- Architectural style: Gothic Revival, Greek Revival, Mid 19th Century Revival
- NRHP reference No.: 98001051
- Added to NRHP: August 21, 1998

Maple Grove Road Rural Historic District is a national historic district located in Bloomington Township and Richland Township, Monroe County, Indiana. The district encompasses 69 contributing buildings, seven contributing sites, eight contributing structures, and 30 contributing objects in a rural area near Bloomington. The district developed between about 1828 and 1950, and include notable examples of Gothic Revival and Greek Revival style architecture. The contributing elements are located on 12 farmsteads. Located in the district is the separately listed Daniel Stout House.

It was listed on the National Register of Historic Places in 1998.
