= Dolan, Indiana =

- Unincorporated community
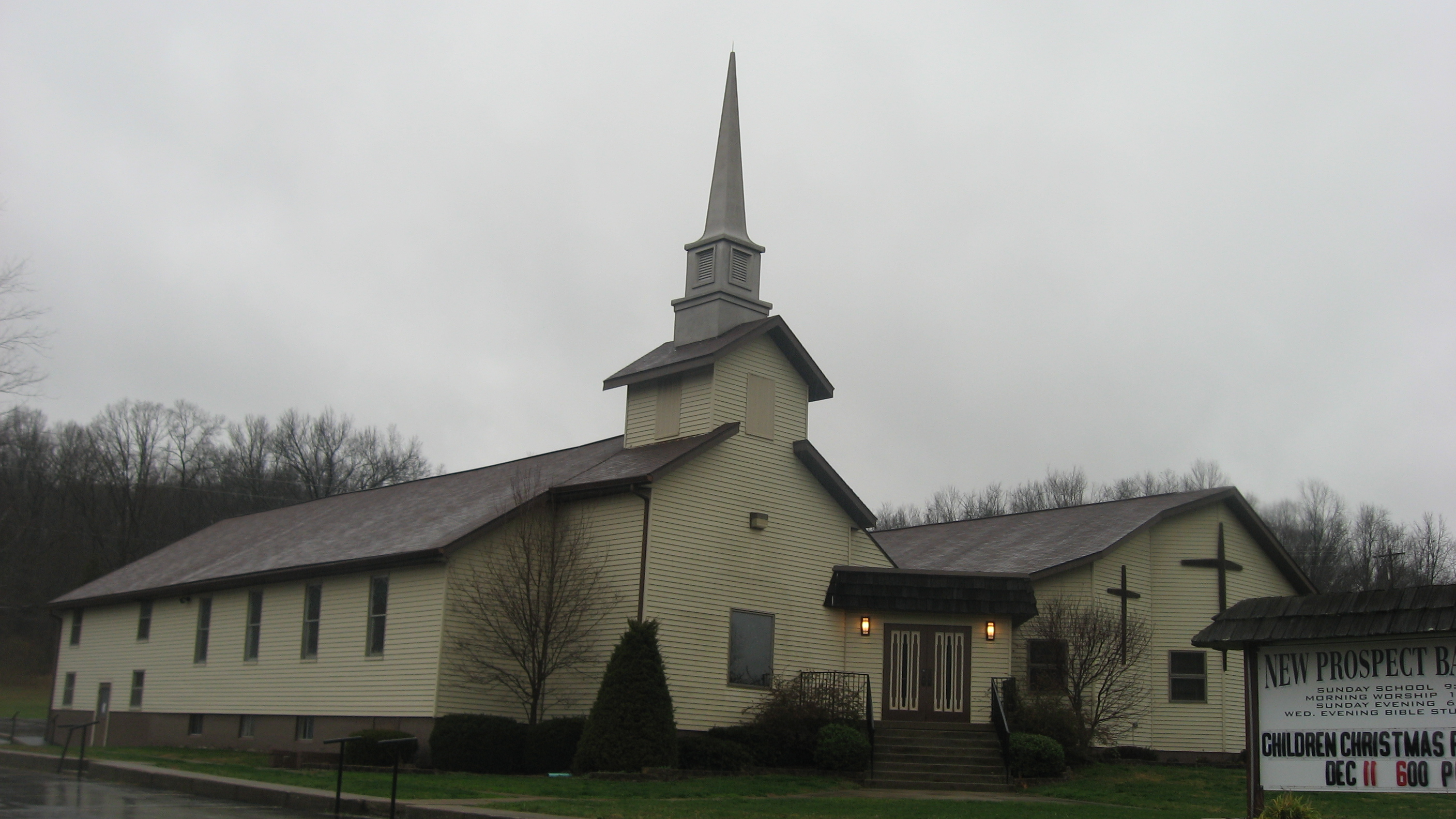
- New Prospect Baptist Church

- Location within Indiana Location within the United States
- Coordinates: 39°14′22″N 86°29′59″W
- Country: United States
- State: Indiana
- County: Monroe
- Township: Bloomington
- Elevation: 614 ft (187 m)
- Time zone: UTC-5 (Eastern (EST))
  - Summer (DST): UTC-4 (EDT)
- ZIP code: 47408
- Area codes: 812, 930
- FIPS code: 18-18352
- GNIS feature ID: 433612

Dolan is an unincorporated community in Bloomington Township, Monroe County, in the U.S. state of Indiana.

== History ==
A post office was established at Dolan in 1888, and remained in operation until 1904. The community was named for John Dolan, an early settler.
