= Leroy Mayfield House =

Historic house in Indiana, United States

- U.S. National Register of Historic Places
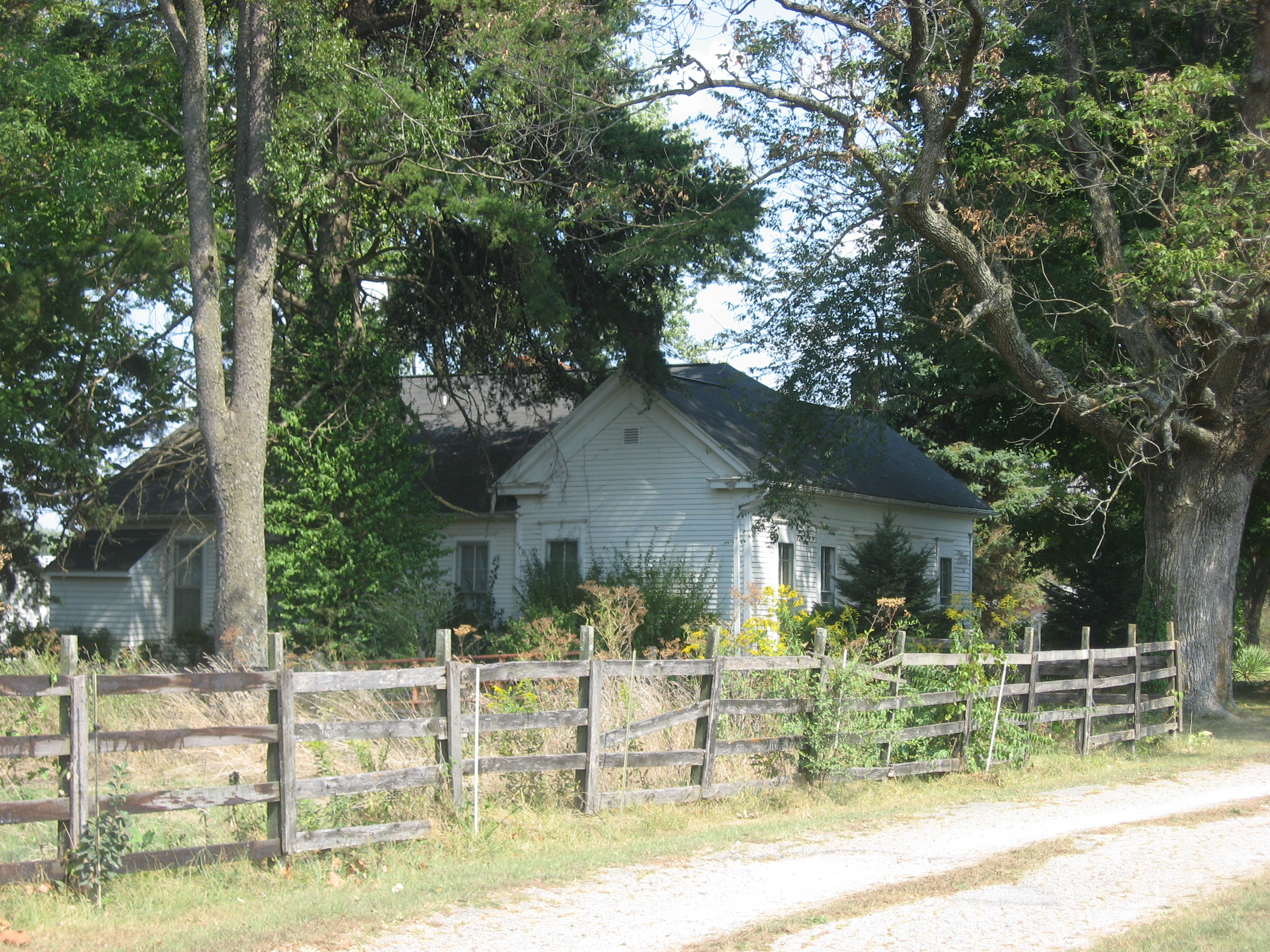
- Leroy Mayfield House, September 2010

- Location within Indiana Location within the United States
- Location: 110 N. Oard Rd., west of Bloomington in Richland Township, Monroe County, Indiana
- Coordinates: 39°10′3″N 86°37′12″W
- Area: less than one acre
- Built: c. 1830
- Architectural style: Greek Revival, central passage
- NRHP reference No.: 94000583
- Added to NRHP: June 10, 1994

Leroy Mayfield House, also known as the Mayfield-Horn House, is a historic home located in Richland Township, Monroe County, Indiana. It was built about 1830, and is a one-story, Greek Revival style frame dwelling with a central passage plan. It sits on a rubble limestone foundation and the front entry is flanked by simple Doric order pilasters.

It was listed on the National Register of Historic Places in 1994.
