= Daniel Stout House =

Historic house in Indiana, United States

- U.S. National Register of Historic Places
- U.S. Historic district – Contributing property
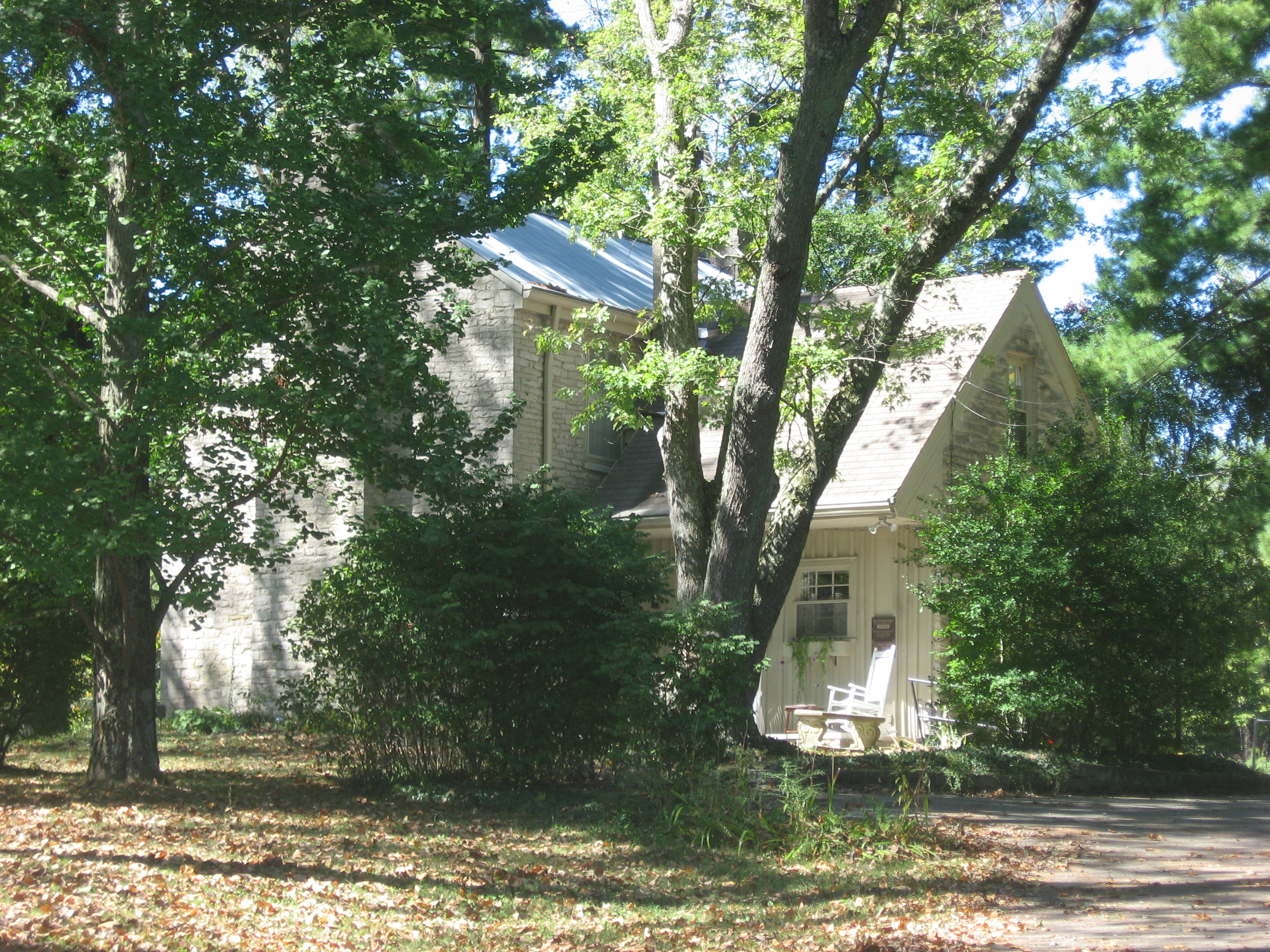
- Daniel Stout House, September 2010

- Location within Indiana Location within the United States
- Location: Northwest of Bloomington off State Road 46, on Maple Grove Rd., Bloomington Township, Monroe County, Indiana
- Coordinates: 39°12′12″N 86°33′32″W
- Area: 1 acre (0.40 ha)
- Built: 1828
- Architectural style: Federal
- NRHP reference No.: 73000012
- Added to NRHP: November 30, 1973

Daniel Stout House, also known as the Old Stone House and Hubert Brown House, is a historic home located in Bloomington Township, Monroe County, Indiana. It was built in 1828, and is a two-story, stone dwelling representative of a pioneer farmhouse. It is believed that its builder Daniel Stout also helped to build Grouseland at Vincennes, Indiana. The house was restored in the 1940s.

It was listed on the National Register of Historic Places in 1973. It is located in the Maple Grove Road Rural Historic District.
