= Ellettsville, Indiana =

- Town
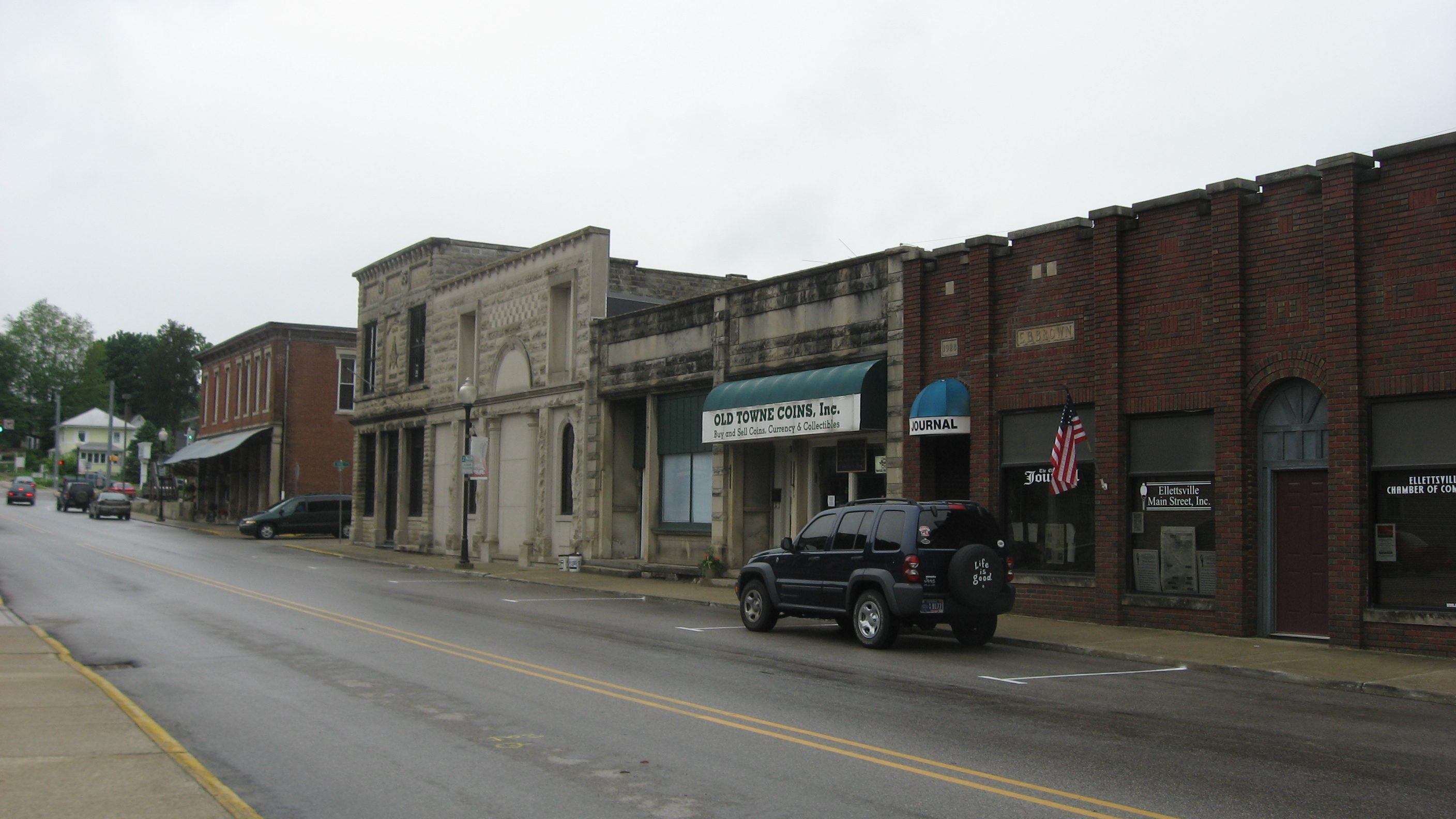
- Downtown Ellettsville

- Seal
- Motto: "Builders Of American History"
- Location of Ellettsville in Monroe County, Indiana.
- Coordinates: 39°13′56″N 86°37′27″W
- Country: United States
- State: Indiana
- County: Monroe
- Township: Richland

Area
  - Total: 5.17 sq mi (13.40 km^{2})
  - Land: 5.17 sq mi (13.40 km^{2})
  - Water: 0 sq mi (0.00 km^{2})
- Elevation: 696 ft (212 m)

Population (2020)
  - Total: 6,655
  - Density: 1,286.2/sq mi (496.61/km^{2})
- Time zone: UTC-5 (Eastern (EST))
  - Summer (DST): UTC-5 (EST)
- ZIP code: 47429
- Area codes: 812, 930
- FIPS code: 18-20800
- GNIS feature ID: 2396926
- Website: https://www.ellettsville.in.us

Ellettsville is a town in Richland Township, Monroe County, Indiana, United States. The population was 6,655 at the 2020 census. It is part of the Bloomington, Indiana metropolitan area.

== History ==
Ellettsville was platted in 1837. In 1818, Edward Ellett Sr. and his wife Eleanor settled in what is now known as Ellettsville with their four minor sons: David, Richard, Johnston and Barton. The first winter, they lived in a three-sided log cabin they built. Also settling that year were their two eldest sons, William and Samuel, with their wives and families. Within a few years daughters Sarah, Phoebe and Nancy settled in the area with their husbands. In 1826, their third eldest son, Edward Jr., also arrived in the town that was named Ellettsville in 1837. Samuel Ellett built the first courthouse in 1820. It was completed ahead of schedule and at the cost of $400. By 1822, the first school opened and with Samuel Ellett's children attending.

When Indiana celebrated its sesquicentennial in 1987, a historical marker was placed to mark the grave of the town's founder, Edward Ellett Sr. (c. 1762–1833). Two of Edward Ellett's sons, Samuel and Edward Jr., fought in The War of 1812. In turn, three of the founder's grandsons fought to preserve the Union in the Civil War. Stephen R. Ellett fought with the 67th Indiana Infantry Regiment, at the Battle of Vicksburg, while his younger brothers, James W. Ellett and John H. Ellett, volunteered and fought with the 27th Indiana Volunteer Infantry Regiment at Gettysburg. James Ellett died in service of his country in 1864 in Alabama while his brother, John Ellett, was wounded at Chancellorsville but survived the Civil War. The family tradition of loyal service to the U.S. was later followed by the founder's great-great-grandson, Dale Ellett, who volunteered and died in World War II in 1945 fighting against Nazi Germany.

The post office at Ellettsville has been in operation since 1837. The community was incorporated as a town in 1866.

Ellettsville Downtown Historic District was listed on the National Register of Historic Places in 2006.

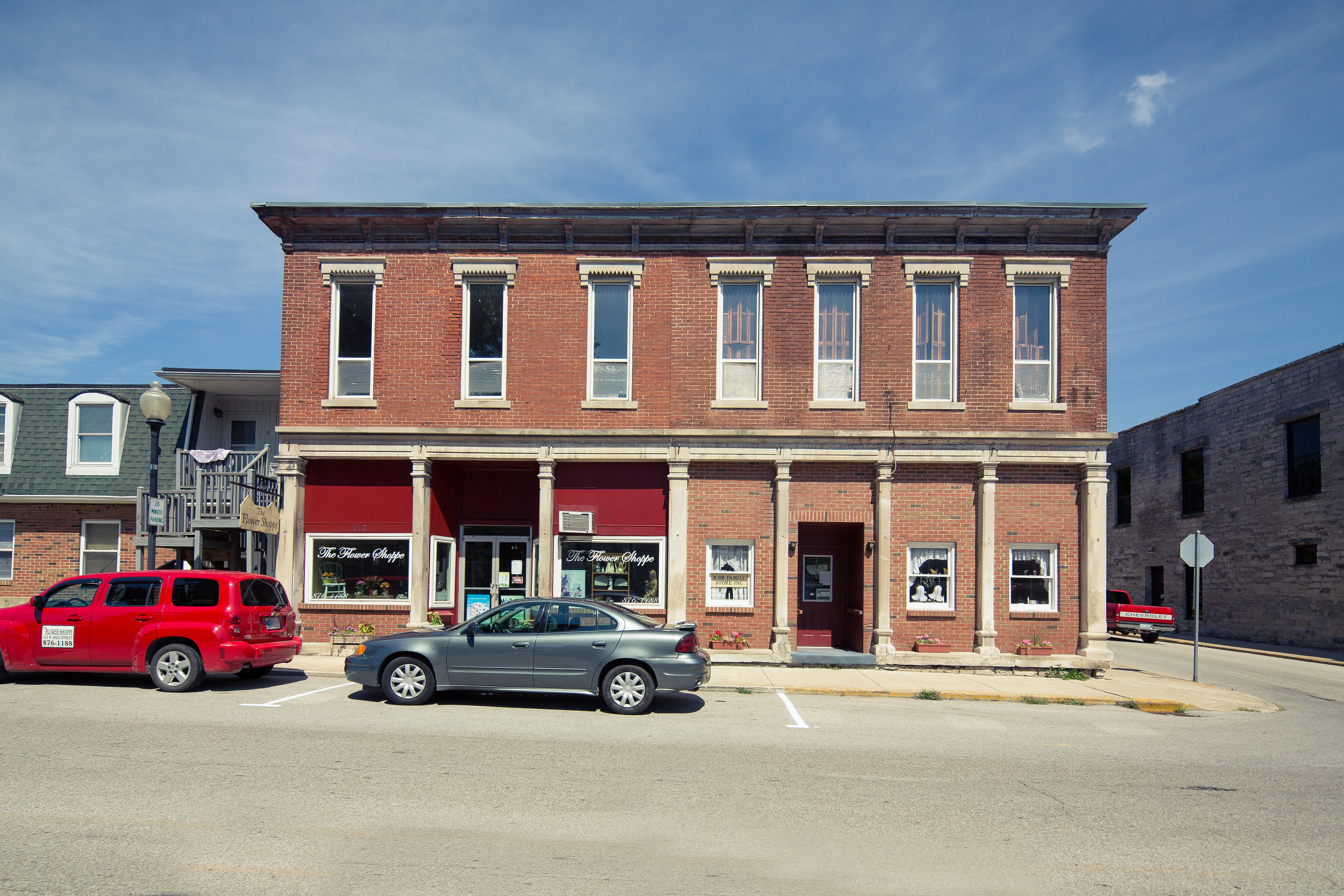
Photo from Small Town Indiana photo survey.

== Geography ==
According to the 2010 census, Ellettsville has a total area of 4.24 square miles (10.98 km^{2}), all land.

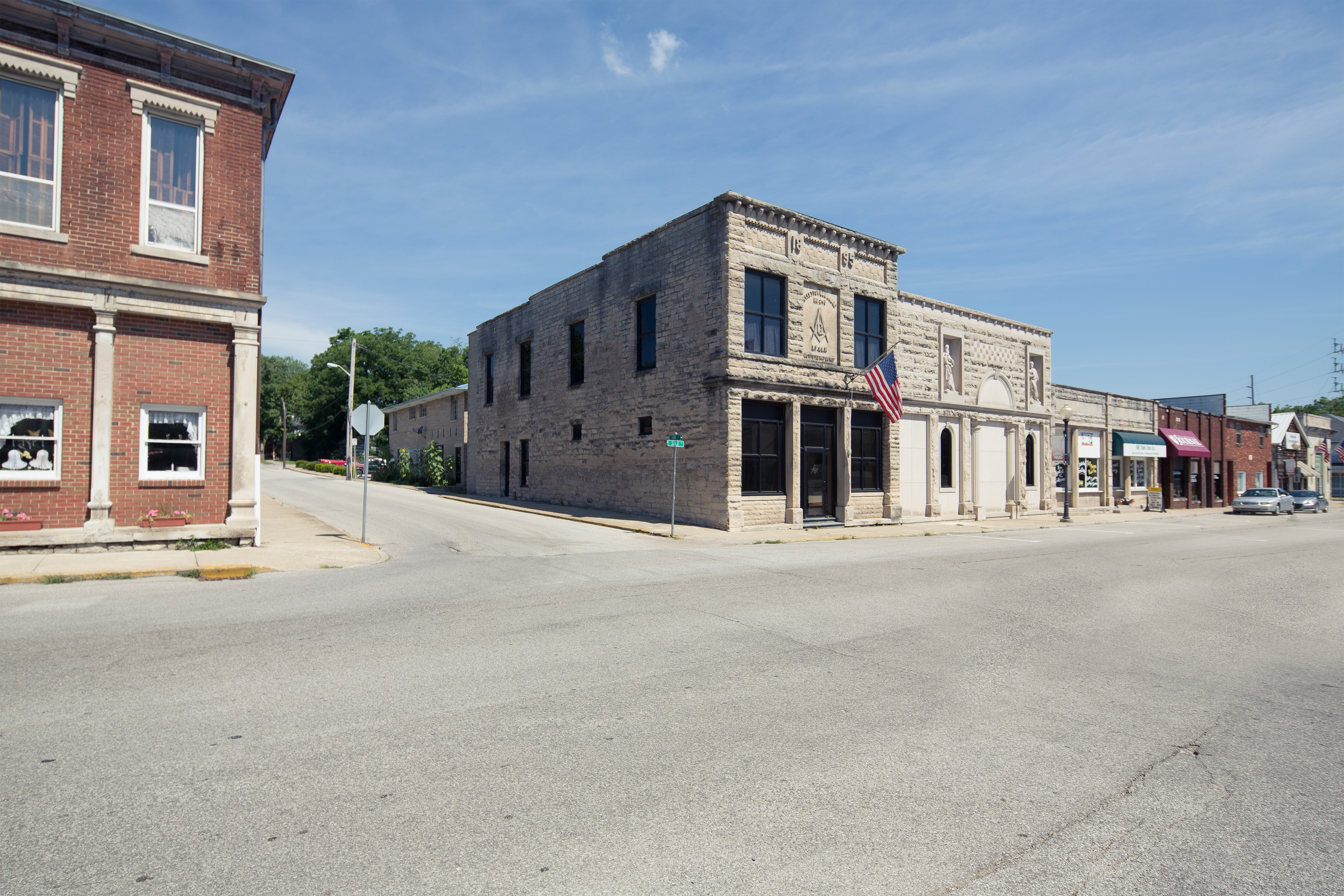
Photo from Small Town Indiana photo survey.

== Demographics ==
Historical population
Census	Pop.	Note	%±
1850	74		—
1880	585		—
1890	712		21.7%
1900	708		−0.6%
1910	676		−4.5%
1920	721		6.7%
1930	767		6.4%
1940	863		12.5%
1950	855		−0.9%
1960	1,222		42.9%
1970	1,627		33.1%
1980	3,328		104.5%
1990	3,275		−1.6%
2000	5,078		55.1%
2010	6,378		25.6%
2020	6,655		4.3%
U.S. Decennial Census

=== 2020 census ===
As of the 2020 census, Ellettsville had a population of 6,655. The median age was 36.2 years. 25.3% of residents were under the age of 18 and 14.3% of residents were 65 years of age or older. For every 100 females there were 87.9 males, and for every 100 females age 18 and over there were 83.0 males age 18 and over.

99.8% of residents lived in urban areas, while 0.2% lived in rural areas.

There were 2,755 households in Ellettsville, of which 33.2% had children under the age of 18 living in them. Of all households, 46.9% were married-couple households, 14.7% were households with a male householder and no spouse or partner present, and 30.7% were households with a female householder and no spouse or partner present. About 30.0% of all households were made up of individuals and 11.7% had someone living alone who was 65 years of age or older.

There were 2,907 housing units, of which 5.2% were vacant. The homeowner vacancy rate was 1.9% and the rental vacancy rate was 5.9%.

Racial composition as of the 2020 census
Race	Number	Percent
White	6,012	90.3%
Black or African American	92	1.4%
American Indian and Alaska Native	8	0.1%
Asian	69	1.0%
Native Hawaiian and Other Pacific Islander	6	0.1%
Some other race	68	1.0%
Two or more races	400	6.0%
Hispanic or Latino (of any race)	162	2.4%

=== 2010 census ===
At the 2010 census, there were 6,378 people, 2,593 households and 1,704 families living in the town. The population density was 1,504.2 per square mile (580.8/km^{2}). There were 2,753 housing units at an average density of 649.3 per square mile (250.7/km^{2}). The racial makeup was 95.5% White, 1.0% African American, 0.2% Native American, 0.6% Asian, 0.7% from other races, and 1.9% from two or more races. Hispanic or Latino of any race were 1.6% of the population.

There were 2,593 households, of which 35.3% had children under the age of 18 living with them, 47.2% were married couples living together, 13.6% had a female householder with no husband present, 5.0% had a male householder with no wife present, and 34.3% were non-families. 28.2% of all households were made up of individuals, and 9.7% had someone living alone who was 65 years of age or older. The average household size was 2.43 and the average family size was 2.98.

The median age was 34.5 years. 26.5% of residents were under the age of 18; 7.7% were between the ages of 18 and 24; 30.7% were from 25 to 44; 23% were from 45 to 64; and 12.1% were 65 years of age or older. The gender makeup of the town was 46.7% male and 53.3% female.

=== 2000 census ===
At the 2000 census, there were 5,078 people, 1,944 households and 1,345 families living in the town. The population density was 2,356.8 per square mile (910.0/km^{2}). There were 2,085 housing units at an average density of 967.7 per square mile (373.6/km^{2}). The racial make-up was 95.83% White, 1.22% African American, 0.18% Native American, 0.73% Asian, 0.81% from other races, and 1.24% from two or more races. Hispanic or Latino of any race were 1.18% of the population.

There were 1,944 households, of which 40.8% had children under the age of 18 living with them, 51.2% were married couples living together, 13.2% had a female householder with no husband present, and 30.8% were non-families. 25.4% of all households were made up of individuals, and 9.1% had someone living alone who was 65 years of age or older. The average household size was 2.57 people, and the average family size was 3.09 people.

30.1% of the population were under the age of 18, 8.4% from 18 to 24, 32.7% from 25 to 44, 19.4% from 45 to 64, and 9.4% who were 65 years of age or older. The median age was 33 years. For every 100 females, there were 90.7 males. For every 100 females age 18 and over, there were 83.0 males.

The median household income was $37,276 and the median family income was $42,950. Males had a median income of $32,153 and females $26,313. The per capita income was $16,120. About 6.7% of families and 9.2% of the population were below the poverty line, including 9.8% of those under age 18 and 12.6% of those age 65 or over.

== Education ==
Edgewood High School serves students in grades 9–12. Edgewood Junior High School serves grades 6–8. Edgewood Intermediate School serves grades 3–5. Edgewood Primary School serves grades K–2. Richland-Bean Blossom Community School Corporation represents the two townships (Richland and Bean Blossom) in northwestern Monroe County.

Ellettsville has a public library, a branch of the Monroe County Public Library.
