= Monroe County Community School Corporation =

School district in Indiana, US

The Monroe County Community School Corporation (MCCSC) is a school corporation providing primary, secondary and adult educational services in Monroe County, Indiana. MCCSC constitutes a unified school district and has tax and legislative authority under Indiana law within its district (all of Monroe County excepting Richland and Bean Blossom Townships, which are under the authority of the Richland-Bean Blossom Community School Corporation).

MCCSC operates fourteen elementary schools, three middle schools, four high schools and one vocational school. In addition, they offer several adult and alternative education facilities.

MCCSC is governed by a board of seven trustees elected to staggered four-year terms on a subdistrict basis within the school district. The board of trustees then hires a superintendent, who oversees the day-to-day administration and operation of the school district.

The school district has significant relationships with Indiana University. The corporation also has many famous individuals visit, such as Frederick Alexander and others.

== Schools ==
=== Elementary schools ===
- Arlington Heights Elementary School
- Binford Elementary School
- Childs Elementary School
- Clear Creek Elementary School
- Fairview Elementary - An Artful Learning and Performing Arts Academy
- Grandview Elementary School
- Highland Park Elementary School
- Lakeview Elementary School
- Marlin Elementary School
- Rogers Elementary School
- Summit Elementary School
- Templeton Elementary School
- Unionville Elementary School
- University Elementary School

=== Middle schools ===
- Batchelor Middle School (Bulldogs)
- Jackson Creek Middle School (Jaguars)
- Tri-North Middle School (Trojans)

=== High schools ===
- Bloomington High School North (Cougars)
- Bloomington High School South (Panthers)
- Bloomington Graduation School (Dragons)
- Bloomington Academy (Wolfpack)

=== Career and Technical (Vocational) School ===
- Hoosier Hills Career Center

=== Adult Education ===
- MCCSC Adult Education

== Student Equity Ambassadors ==
MCCSC created a program in 2021 titled Student Equity Ambassadors (SEA). Students who attend any of the high schools in the school district are eligible to apply to become a part of SEA. The role of SEA is to design and modify policies via Youth Participatory Action Research (YPAR). SEA is separated into groups by the associated school along with an educator liaison (a teacher or staff member who sponsors the group similar to a club).

== Policies ==
=== Wireless Communication Devices ===
MCCSC issued a wireless communication device policy (Code 5136) (as governed by Senate Enrolled Act 185) in June 2024. The policy states that any student enrolled in an MCCSC school is disallowed from using any mobile communication device (MCD) during instructional time unless in these specific circumstances:

- If the student has explicit permission from a teacher.
- In an emergency situation
- To manage their healthcare
- If MCD use is included in their Individualized Education Program (IEP), Individualized Language Plan (ILP), or Section 504 plan."

=== Anti-Racism ===
MCCSC issued an anti-racism policy (Code 5518; designed by SEA) in February 2023. The policy states 6 goals:

- "To create a racially safe, inclusive, and accepting learning environment for every student and staff member,
- "To raise the academic achievement of all students,
- "To provide instruction centered on principles of equity,
- "To eliminate predictability in student outcomes and educational experiences according to race,
- "To actively center equity in the development of all newly created and revised policies, and
- "To provide opportunities that include diverse student perspectives, voice, and lived experiences in the development of corporation and school wide programs, practices and procedures."

=== Equity-Centered Sexual Identity and Gender Inclusive Policy ===
MCCSC issued an LGBTQ+ inclusivity policy (Code 5519; designed by SEA) in August 2024. The policy states 4 goals:

- "To ensure representation regarding sexual identity and gender inclusiveness through accurately depicting individuals across the spectrum of orientations and identities; fostering inclusion, validating experiences, and promoting understanding and equity.
- "To ensure access for all students through providing fair opportunities and resources to all, regardless of sexual orientation or gender identity, that involves removing barriers to healthcare, education, and other essential services, so every student can fully participate in school and society.
- "To foster meaningful participation in schools so that every student's voice is actively engaged while creating inclusive environments where diverse perspectives are valued and respected.
- "To achieve positive outcomes for all students, regardless of sexual identity or gender orientation by providing equitable opportunities and support systems that when implemented, foster success and well-being."
