= List of Indiana University Bloomington people =

This is a list of notable current and former faculty members, alumni, and non-graduating attendees of Indiana University Bloomington in Bloomington, Indiana.

== Presidents of Indiana University ==
The following persons have served as president of the Indiana University system:

No.	Image	President	Term start	Term end	Refs.
1		Andrew Wylie	October 29, 1829	November 11, 1851 (Note: Died in office)	
2		Alfred Ryors	1852	1853	
3		William Mitchel Daily	1853	1859	
4		John Hiram Lathrop	1859	1860	
5		Cyrus Nutt	1860	1875	
6		Lemuel Moss	1875	1884	
7		David Starr Jordan	1884	1891	
8		John Merle Coulter	1891	1893	
9		Joseph Swain	1893	1902	
10		William Lowe Bryan	August 1, 1902	June 30, 1937	
acting		Herman B Wells	July 1, 1937	June 30, 1938	
11		Herman B Wells	July 1, 1938	June 30, 1962	
12		Elvis Jacob Stahr Jr.	July 1, 1962	September 1, 1968	
interim		Herman B Wells	September 1, 1968	November 30, 1969	
13		Joseph Sutton	December 1, 1968	January 25, 1971	
14		John W. Ryan	January 26, 1971	July 31, 1987	
15		Thomas Ehrlich	August 1, 1987	July 31, 1994	
16		Myles Brand	August 1, 1994	December 31, 2002	
interim		Gerald L. Bepko	January 1, 2003	August 31, 2003	
17		Adam Herbert	August 1, 2003	June 30, 2007	
18		Michael McRobbie	July 1, 2007	June 30, 2021	
19		Pamela Whitten	July 1, 2021	present	

Table notes:

== Chancellors of Indiana University Bloomington ==
"Chancellor" is not to be confused with "University Chancellor", a title usually given to retired system presidents employed by the Indiana University system to assist in fundraising activities for the university system.

The title and office of campus chancellor was created three separate times, and the position was reabsorbed by the president of the university (system) twice.

The following persons have served as chancellor of Indiana University Bloomington:

Leaders of the IU Bloomington campus
No.	Image	Chancellor	Term start	Term end	Refs.
Position created in 1969
acting		John W. Snyder	January 22, 1969	May 31, 1969	
acting		Byrum E. Carter	July 1, 1969	July 28, 1969	
1		Byrum E. Carter	July 28, 1969	June 30, 1975	
Position eliminated in 1975 and restored in 1988
2		Kenneth Gros Louis	May 1988	June 30, 2001	
3		Sharon Brehm	July 1, 2001	December 31, 2003	
acting		Kenneth Gros Louis	January 1, 2003	January 31, 2006	
Position eliminated in 2006 and restored in 2025
4		David Reingold	June 2, 2025	present	

== Academics ==
- R.J.Q. Adams, B.S., 1965, professor of British history at Texas A&M University
- Elijah Anderson, Sterling Professor of Sociology and of African American Studies at Yale University
- Richard T. Antoun, professor emeritus of anthropology at Binghamton University
- Jason Beckfield (PhD), professor of Sociology at Harvard University
- Metin Boşnak (MA in Comparative Literature, 1990), Turkish linguist and academic
- Joseph C. Burke, former president of State University of New York at Plattsburgh, former Acting Chancellor of the State University of New York
- Margaret K. Butler, mathematician specializing in computer software
- Thomas H. Buxton, academic and distinguished professor at the University of South Carolina
- Shiladitya DasSarma, molecular biologist and professor at University of Maryland School of Medicine
- Lewis C. Dowdy, Ed.D., 1965, sixth president and first chancellor of North Carolina Agricultural and Technical State University
- Elisabeth Joan Doyle (1922–2009), historian, author, and educator
- Keith Fitzgerald, political scientist
- William Dudley Geer, first dean of the School of Business at Samford University
- William Germano, Ph.D., dean of the faculty of humanities at Cooper Union
- Michael Harris (Hebrew : מייקל הריס), Israeli-American public policy scholar and university administrator
- Israel Nathan Herstein, Ph.D., 1948, mathematician and professor at University of Chicago
- Reginald Horsman, Ph.D., 1958, distinguished professor at the University of Wisconsin–Milwaukee
- Melvin N. Johnson, MBA 1979, DBA 1983, economist; president of Tennessee State University (2005–2011)
- Joann Kealiinohomoku (Ph.D., 1976), anthropologist and dance researcher
- Jeanne Knoerle, former president of Saint Mary-of-the-Woods College and program director of the Lilly Endowment
- Jerome Krase, professor emeritus and archivist at Brooklyn College
- Paul Musgrave, professor of government and an expert in American foreign policy matters
- William B. Pickett, historian and professor emeritus at Rose-Hulman Institute of Technology, Terre Haute, Indiana
- Sarah M. Pike, Ph.D., 1998, author and professor of comparative religion at California State University, Chico
- Robert N. Proctor, B.S., 1976, professor of History of Science at Harvard
- Billy Rhoades (1928–2021), mathematician and professor at IU
- Elliot Sperling, Tibet scholar
- Mark von Hagen (M.A., Slavic Languages and Literatures), director, School of Historical, Philosophical and Religious Studies, Arizona State University
- Aldred Scott Warthin, pathologist, "father of cancer genetics"

== Arts and humanities ==
- Tony Aiello, broadcast journalist
- Ismail al-Faruqi, philosopher and epistemologist
- Monroe Anderson, journalist, author, was Chicago's press secretary for Mayor Eugene Sawyer
- David Anspaugh, movie director, Hoosiers and Rudy
- Howard Ashman, playwright and lyricist
- Elliott Baker, author, screenwriter, Emmy Award winner
- Radley Balko, journalist and writer
- Jonathan Banks, actor, "Mike Ehrmantraut" of Breaking Bad and Better Call Saul
- Mike Barz, broadcast journalist
- Lyndall Bass, artist, shield cent designer
- Betty Jane Belanus (Ph.D., Folklore), employee of and curator of several Smithsonian Folklife Festival programs
- Daniel Bourne, poet
- Todd Brewster, journalist and historian
- Jan Harold Brunvand, American folklorist, one of the best-known researchers and anthologists of urban legends; earned PhD in folklore
- Joe Buck, sportscaster, multiple Emmy Award winner
- Meg Cabot, author The Princess Diaries
- E. Jean Carroll, journalist and advice columnist
- Siobhan Carroll, professor, scholar and writer
- David Chalmers, leading philosopher in the area of philosophy of mind
- Sarah Clarke, actress
- Tan Kheng Hua, actress
- Suzanne Collins, television writer, novelist known for The Hunger Games
- Robert Coover, author
- J. Lee, actor
- Laverne Cox, actress and television producer
- E. Wayne Craven, art historian
- John Crowley, science fiction author, author of The Deep and Little, Big
- Matthew Daddario, actor, "Alec Lightwood" of Shadowhunters
- Tim Downs, author and comic artist for Downstown
- Theodore Dreiser, author (dropped out)
- Michel du Cille, photographer, two-time Pulitzer Prize winner
- Dick Enberg, sportscaster, 13-time Emmy Award winner
- Scott Ferrall, sports talk radio host
- John M. Ford, poet and science fiction author
- Sherron Francis, artist
- Tom French, Pulitzer Prize–winning journalist, St. Petersburg Times
- David C. Giuntoli, actor
- Karen Glaser, photographer, known for her underwater photography
- Jennifer Grotz, award-winning poet
- Aishah Hasnie, broadcast journalist
- Joseph Hayes, playwright, novelist
- Don Herold, author, humorist and illustrator
- Nancy Hiller, cabinetmaker, educator, and author
- Lissa Hunter, artist
- Edward D. Ives, folklorist
- Patricia Kalember, actress
- Andreas Katsulas, actor
- Debra A. Kemp, author of Arthurian literature, such as The Firebrand
- Charles Kimbrough, actor
- Kevin Kline, Academy Award-winning actor
- Michael Koryta, novelist
- Mark Lavie, journalist
- Ross Lockridge Jr., author of Raintree County
- Bienvenido Lumbera, poet, critic, playwright, Ramon Magsaysay Award winner and National Artist of the Philippines
- Lee Majors, actor, The Six Million Dollar Man
- Sunil Malhotra, actor
- Alfred McAdams, painter
- Judith McCulloh (Ph.D., Folklore), folklorist, ethnomusicologist, and university press editor
- David McLane, creator, promoter and producer of Gorgeous Ladies of Wrestling
- Don Mellett, 1914, journalist, newspaper editor, Pulitzer Prize winner
- Gene Miller, journalist, editor, two-time Pulitzer Prize winner
- Arian Moayed, Tony-nominated actor, co-founder of Waterwell and writer/director
- Ryan Murphy, Golden Globe-winning television producer (Nip/Tuck); best known for American Horror Story
- Dave Niehaus, broadcaster, Seattle Mariners
- Komelia Hongja Okim, sculptor
- Nicole Parker, actress
- Jane Pauley, television personality and journalist
- Angelo Pizzo, screenwriter, producer, director
- Ernie Pyle, journalist, Pulitzer Prize winner in 1944
- Catt Sadler, television personality on E! Entertainment Television
- Rob Schmitt, journalist and commentator
- Amanda Schull, actress
- Scott Schuman, photographer and blogger
- Alexander Shimkin, Vietnam war correspondent
- Will Shortz, puzzle maker (enigmatologist)
- Ranveer Singh, Indian actor
- Tavis Smiley, National Public Radio and Public Television host
- Gary Snyder, poet and environmental activist, Pulitzer Prize winner (did not graduate)
- Lucy A. Snyder, author
- Brian Stack, actor, Late Night with Conan O'Brien
- Sage Steele, podcaster
- Jeri Taylor, screenwriter and television producer (Star Trek)
- Nancy Weaver Teichert, Pulitzer Prize-winning reporter
- Michael Uslan, film producer (Batman)
- Herb Vigran, actor
- Emil Wakim, actor and comedian, Saturday Night Live
- Aaron Waltke, Emmy-winning screenwriter and executive producer (Star Trek, Tales of Arcadia)
- Clark Wissler, anthropology pioneer

== Business ==
- Klaus Agthe, former chairman and CEO of ASEA Brown Boveri
- John Bitove, chairman and CEO of XM Canada, Priszm and Scott's REIT; founder of Toronto Raptors (NBA)
- John Chambers, president and CEO of Cisco Systems
- Bob Chapek, CEO of The Walt Disney Company
- Gayle Cook, co-founder of the Cook Group
- Mark Cuban, technology entrepreneur; Dallas Mavericks owner; co-founder of Broadcast.com with Todd Wagner in 1995
- William S. Dalton, current CEO of the H. Lee Moffitt Cancer Center and Research Institute
- Lance de Masi, president of the American University in Dubai
- Donald Fehr, managing director, Major League Baseball Players Association
- Jeff M. Fettig, chairman and CEO of the Whirlpool Corporation
- Jared Fogle, former spokesman for Subway and convicted sex offender
- E. W. Kelley, former chairman of Steak 'n Shake
- Donald Knauss, former CEO of Clorox Company and COO of The Coca-Cola Company in North America
- Harold Arthur Poling, retired chairman and CEO of Ford Motor Company
- Frank Popoff, retired chairman and CEO of Dow Chemical Company
- Conrad Prebys, property developer based in San Diego
- Patty Stonesifer, former CEO, Bill and Melinda Gates Foundation; chairwoman of Smithsonian Institution
- Todd Wagner, CEO of 2929 Entertainment; founder of Todd Wagner Foundation; co-founder of Broadcast.com with Mark Cuban in 1995
- Jimmy Wales, former CEO of Bomis, co-founder of Wikipedia, president of the Wikimedia Foundation (did not graduate)
- Peter Wong, CEO of The Hongkong and Shanghai Banking Corporation (HSBC), Asia-Pacific

== Law, politics, and government ==
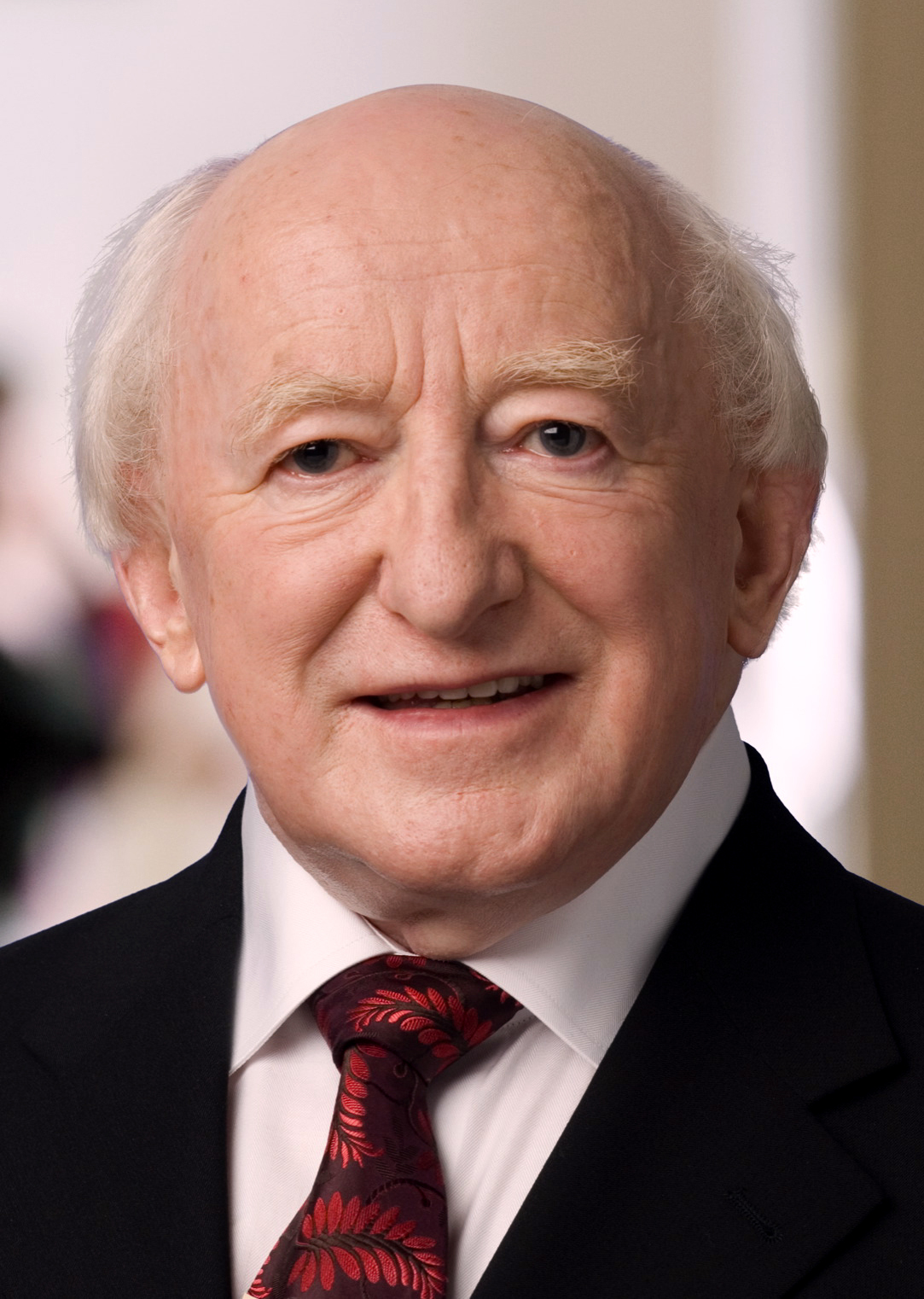
Michael D. Higgins

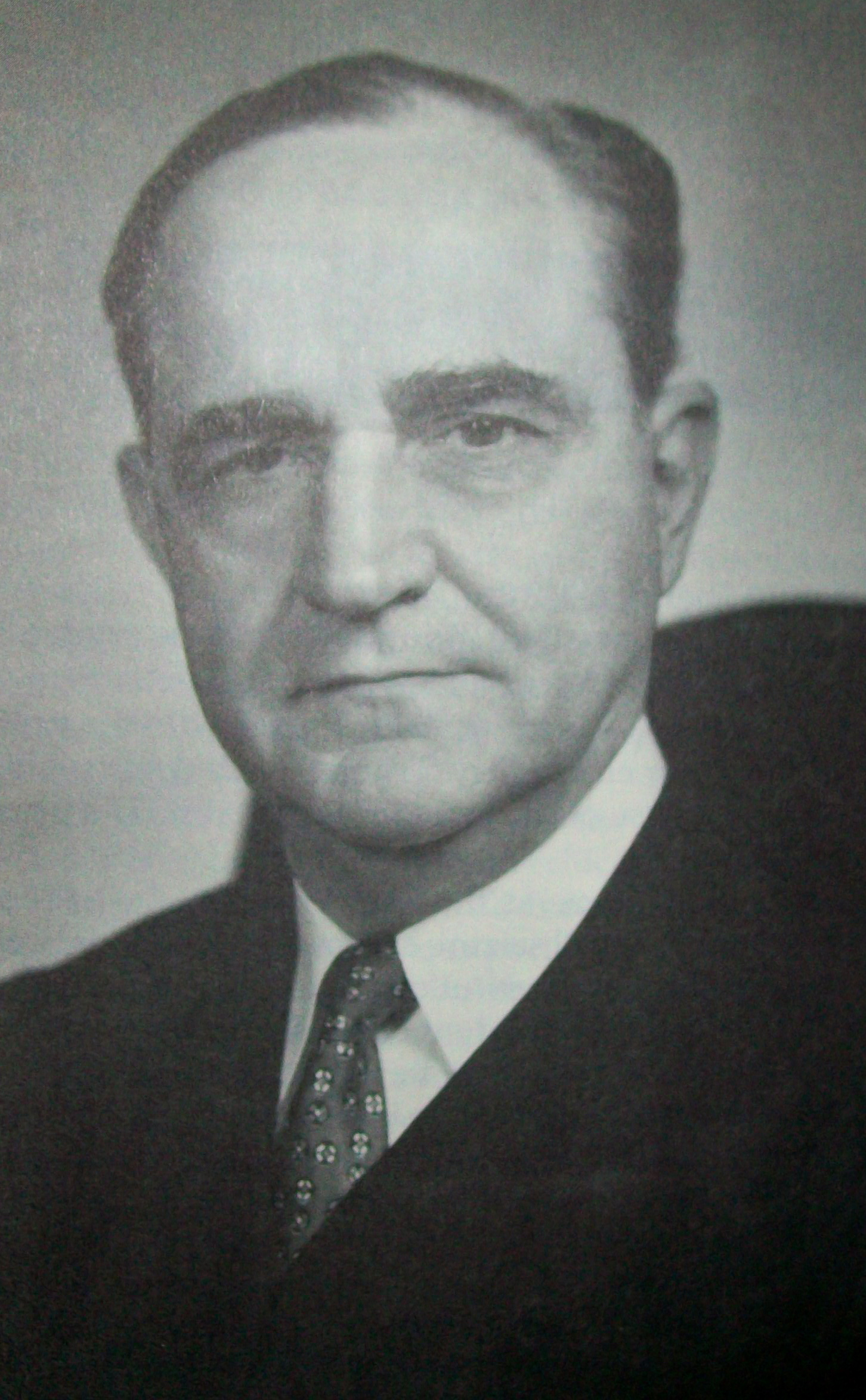
Sherman Minton

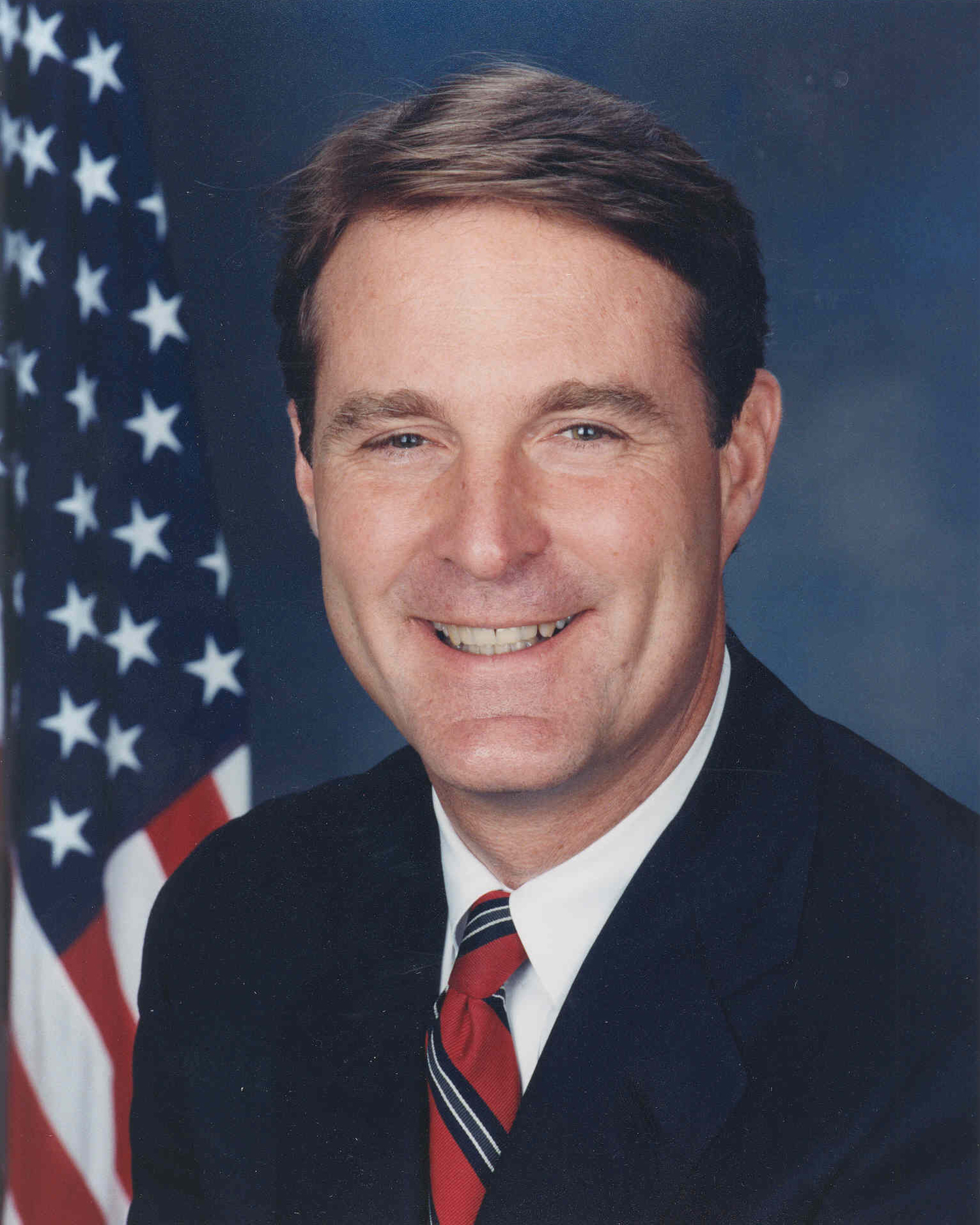
Evan Bayh

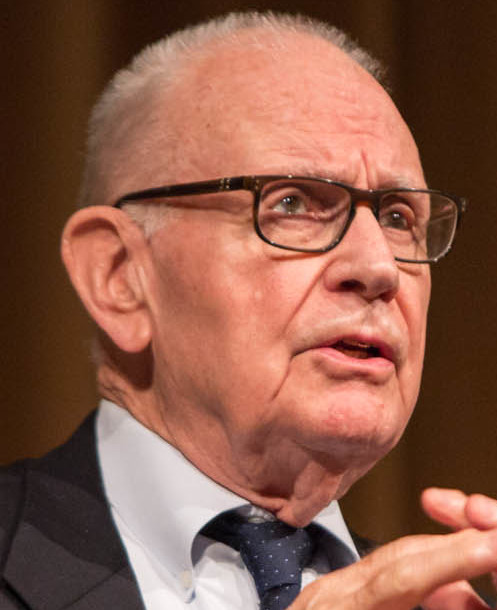
Lee H. Hamilton

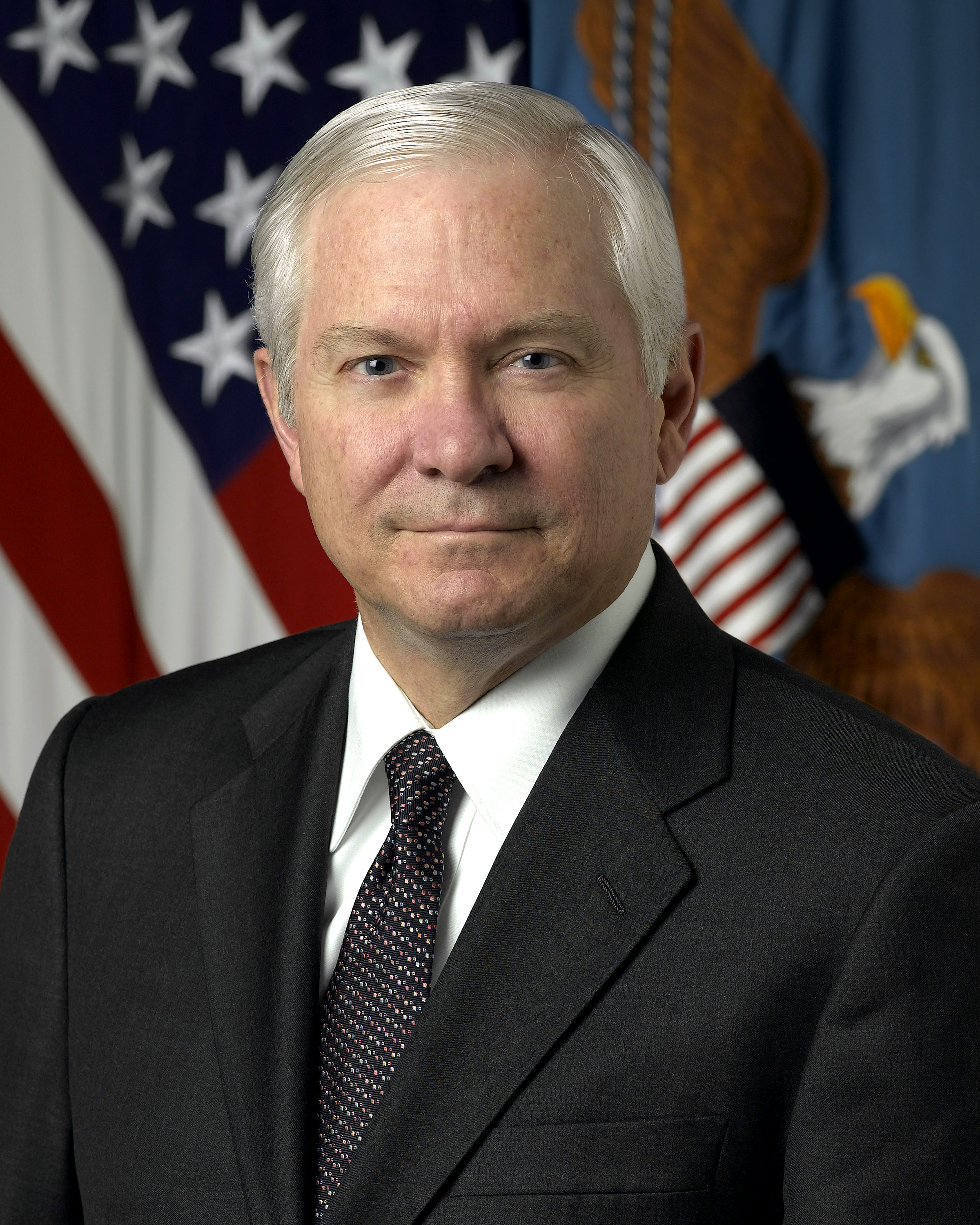
Robert Gates

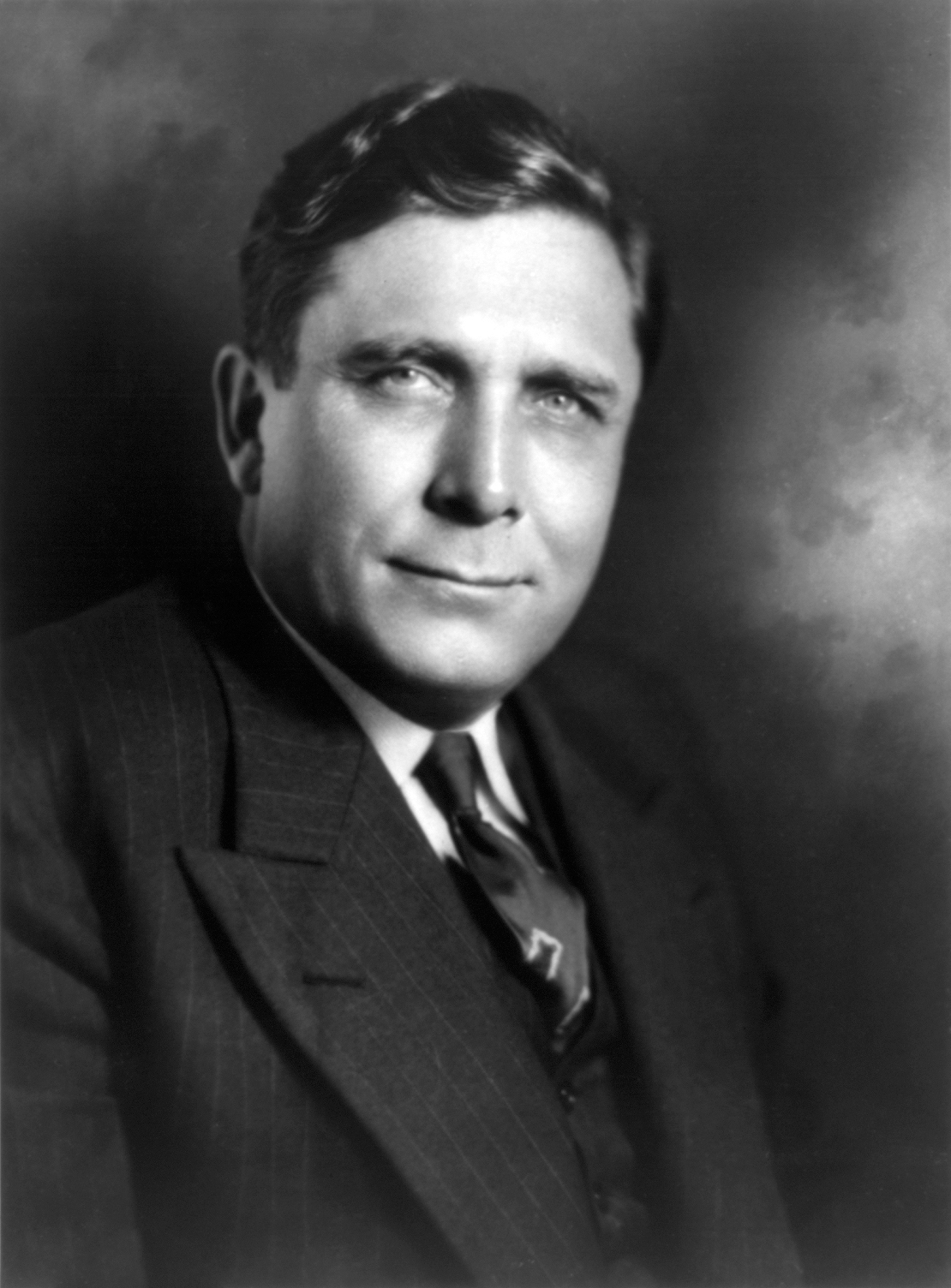
Wendell Willkie

=== Heads of state and government ===
- Michael D. Higgins (M.A. 1967), president of Ireland (2011–present)
- Selim Hoss (Ph.D. 1961), prime minister of Lebanon (1976–1980, 1987–1990, 1998–2000)

=== Supreme Court justices ===
- Sherman Minton (B.A. 1913, LL.B. 1915), Supreme Court justice (1949–1956)
- Wiley Blount Rutledge (attended), Supreme Court justice (1943–1949)

=== U.S. senators ===
- Jim Banks (B.A. 2004), U.S. senator (R-Indiana, 2025–present), former U.S. representative (R-Indiana, 2017–2025)
- Birch Bayh (LL.B. 1960), U.S. senator (D-Indiana, 1963–1981)
- Evan Bayh (B.S. 1978), U.S. senator (D-Indiana, 1999–2011)
- Vance Hartke (J.D. 1948), U.S. senator (D-Indiana, 1959–1977)
- William E. Jenner (B.A. 1930, LL.B. 1932), U.S. senator (R-Indiana, 1944–1945, 1947–1959)
- Newell Sanders (B.S. 1873), U.S. senator (R-Tennessee, 1912–1913)

=== U.S. representatives ===
- John H. Foster (B.A. 1882), U.S. representative (R-Indiana, 1905–1909)
- Katie Hall (M.S. 1968), U.S. representative (D-Indiana, 1982–1985)
- Charles A. Halleck (B.A. 1922, LL.B. 1924), U.S. representative (R-Indiana, 1935–1969)
- Lee H. Hamilton (J.D. 1956), U.S. representative (D-Indiana, 1965–1999)
- Elwood Hillis (B.S. 1949, J.D. 1952), U.S. representative (D-Indiana, 1971–1987)
- Frank McCloskey (B.A. 1968, J.D. 1971), U.S. representative (D-Indiana, 1983–1995)
- Francis B. Posey (LL.B. 1869), U.S. representative (R-Indiana, 1889)
- J. Edward Roush (LL.B. 1949), U.S. representative (D-Indiana, 1959–1969, 1971–1977)
- Jefferson Shreve (B.A.), U.S. representative (R-Indiana, 2025–present)
- Jill Long Thompson (M.B.A. 1978, Ph.D. 1984), U.S. representative (D-Indiana, 1989–1995)
- Simeon K. Wolfe (LL.B. 1850), U.S. representative (D-Indiana, 1873–1875)

=== Governors, other state officials and mayors ===
- Cheri Herman Daniels, First Lady of Indiana (2005–2013) and commissioner of the Indiana State Fair (2022–2025)
- Curtis Hill (B.S. 1983, J.D. 1987), Indiana attorney general (2017–2021)
- Joe Hogsett (B.A. 1978, J.D. 1981), mayor of Indianapolis (2016–present)
- Thomas M. Honan (1899), speaker of the Indiana House of Representatives (1908–1910) and Indiana attorney general (1911–1915)
- Laura Kelly (M.S.), governor of Kansas (2019–present)
- Mark Kohler (M.A. 1984), secretary of the State of Connecticut (2022–2023)
- Mindy McAlindon, member of the Arkansas House of Representatives
- Arthur C. Mellette (B.A. 1863, M.A. 1864, LL.B. 1866), governor of South Dakota (1889–1893)
- Richard M. Milburn (attended), Indiana attorney general (January 1915–November 1915)
- Elise Nieshalla (M.A. 2000), Indiana state auditor (2023–present)
- Frank O'Bannon (B.A. 1952, J.D. 1957), governor of Indiana (1997–2003)
- William L. Taylor (B.A. 1877), Indiana attorney general (1898–1903)
- Jill Underly (B.A. 1999), Wisconsin state superintendent of Public Instruction (2021-present)
- Jonathan Weinzapfel (B.A. 1988), mayor of Evansville (2004–2011)
- Edgar Whitcomb (attended), governor of Indiana (1969–1973)
- Greg Zoeller (J.D. 1982), Indiana attorney general (2009–2017)

=== Cabinet members, chairpersons/administrators and advisers ===
- Jerry Abramson (B.S. 1968), White House director of Intergovernmental Affairs (2014–2017)
- Otis Bowen (B.A. 1939), secretary of Health and Human Services (1985–1989)
- Leroy Edgar Burney (B.S. 1928, M.D. 1930), Surgeon General of the United States (1956–1961)
- Robert Gates (M.A. 1966), secretary of defense (2006–2011)
- Paul H. O'Neill (M.P.A. 1966), secretary of the Treasury (2001–2002)
- Rod Paige (M.Ed. 1962, Ed.D. 1970), secretary of education (2001–2005)
- Jeremy Pelter (B.A. 2003), acting United States secretary of commerce (2025)
- Jill Ruckelshaus (B.A. 1958), assistant to the president for Women's Affairs (1974)

=== Diplomats ===
- Feisal al-Istrabadi (B.A. 1986, J.D. 1988), ambassador and deputy permanent representative of Iraq to the United Nations (2004–2007)
- Victor Jackovich (B.A. 1970, M.A. 1971), U.S. ambassador to Slovenia (1995–1998), U.S. ambassador to Bosnia and Herzegovina (1993–1995)
- Paul V. McNutt (B.A. 1913), United States ambassador to the Philippines (1946–1947)
- Richard Miles (M.A. 1964), chargé d'affaires in Kyrgyzstan (2015), chargé d'affaires in Turkmenistan (2008–2009), U.S. ambassador to Georgia (2002–2005), U.S. ambassador to Bulgaria (1999–2002), U.S. ambassador to Azerbaijan (1992–1993)

=== Judges and attorneys ===
- Linda Dunikoski (B.A. 1988), senior assistant district attorney of Cobb County, Georgia
- Christopher M. Goff (J.D. 1996), associate justice of the Indiana Supreme Court (2017–present)
- Mark Massa (B.A. 1983), associate justice of the Indiana Supreme Court (2012–present)
- Loretta Rush (J.D. 1983), chief justice of the Indiana Supreme Court (2014–present), justice of the Indiana Supreme Court (2012–present)
- Geoffrey G. Slaughter (B.A. 1985, M.B.A. 1989, J.D. 1989), associate justice of the Indiana Supreme Court (2016–present)
- James Johnston Thornton, lawyer, Military Reconstruction judge, land developer

=== Other ===
- Michael Badnarik (attended), Libertarian Party presidential nominee (2004)
- Ghoulem Berrah (M.S. 1961, Ph.D. 1963), special assistant to President Félix Houphouët-Boigny (1965–1993)
- James B. Bullard (Ph.D. 1990), president of the Federal Reserve Bank of St. Louis (2008–present)
- Deepender Singh Hooda (M.B.A. 2003), member of Parliament Rajya Sabha (2020–present)
- Charles Kennedy (attended), leader of the Liberal Democrats (1999–2006), member of Parliament for Ross, Skye and Lochaber (1983–2015)
- Mike Schreiner (M.A. 1994), leader of the Green Party of Ontario (2009–present)
- Salman Shah (Ph.D. 1984), caretaker finance minister of Pakistan (2007–2008)
- Dandara Touré (M.P.H.), minister for the Promotion of Women, Children and the Family (2012)
- Wendell Willkie (B.A. 1913, LL.B. 1916), Republican Party presidential nominee (1940)

== Music ==
- Jamey Aebersold, jazz educator
- Kenny Aronoff, drummer
- Emilie Autumn, gothic violinist and singer
- David Baker, jazz composer
- Klara Barlow, operatic soprano
- Jamie Barton, operatic mezzo-soprano
- Joshua Bell, Grammy Award-winning concert violinist
- Noah Bendix-Balgley, violinist, concertmaster of Pittsburgh Symphony Orchestra, 1st concertmaster of Berlin Philharmonic
- Jonathan Biss, pianist, professor at Curtis Institute of Music
- Tom Borton, jazz saxophonist and composer
- Chris Botti, Grammy Award-winning jazz trumpeter
- Cary Boyce, composer
- Michael Brecker, jazz saxophonist
- Angela Brown, soprano
- Lawrence Brownlee, operatic tenor
- Hoagy Carmichael, songwriter and actor, "Stardust", "Georgia on My Mind"
- Angelin Chang, Grammy Award-winning classical pianist
- John Clayton, jazz and classical bassist, composer and arranger
- Jim Cornelison, tenor
- Dorian, hip-hop recording artist and record producer
- Peter Erskine, jazz drummer and educator
- Miriam Fried, violinist and pedagogue, professor at New England Conservatory, winner of Queen Elisabeth Music Competition
- Vivica Genaux, mezzo-soprano
- Tom Gullion, jazz saxophonist
- Jeff Hamilton, jazz drummer
- Margaret Harshaw, mezzo-soprano and soprano at Metropolitan Opera
- Booker T. Jones, songwriter, producer
- Paul Katz, cellist, founding member of Cleveland Quartet, professor at New England Conservatory
- Charles Kullman, tenor and chair of voice department at Metropolitan Opera
- Frankie Masters, big band leader
- Sylvia McNair, internationally acclaimed soprano
- Edgar Meyer, Grammy Award-winning bassist, MacArthur Fellow, professor at Curtis Institute of Music
- Hu Nai-yuan, violinist, winner of the Queen Elisabeth Music Competition
- Shawn Pelton, session drummer
- Larry Ridley, jazz bassist and music educator
- Leonard Slatkin, composer and conductor, music director of Detroit Symphony Orchestra and BBC Symphony Orchestra
- Straight No Chaser, a cappella group at IU 1996–1999; re-formed in 2008
- Eileen Strempel, soprano and educator
- Patrick Summers, conductor, artistic director Houston Grand Opera
- Michael Weiss, jazz pianist, composer and educator
- Pharez Whitted, jazz trumpet and composer
- Pete Wilhoit, jazz and rock drummer and percussionist

== Science and technology ==
- Wendy Boss, botanist at North Carolina State University
- Marion Durbin Ellis, ichthyologist and entomologist
- Max Mapes Ellis, physiologist and explorer
- John Diederich Haseman, zoologist, geologist, and explorer
- Stephani Hatch, psychiatric epidemiologist at the Institute of Psychiatry, Psychology and Neuroscience
- Jamie Hyneman, special effects expert; best known as co-host of the television series MythBusters
- Scott A. Jones, inventor and serial entrepreneur, widely known for inventing voicemail systems
- Kayla C. King, professor of evolutionary ecology at University of Oxford, UK
- Britt Koskella, evolutionary biologist professor at University of California, Berkeley
- Samuel LaBudde, Goldman Award-winning environmentalist and biologist
- Carl Otto Lampland, astronomer
- Wardell Pomeroy, sexologist
- Vesto Slipher, astronomer
- John T. Thompson, military officer, supervised development of the M1903 Springfield rifle and the M1911 pistol, inventor of the Thompson submachine gun
- Horace M. Trent, physicist best known for finding that a bull whip's crack is a sonic boom and for writing the currently accepted force-current analogy in physics known as the Trent analogy
- Mansukh C. Wani, cancer researcher, discoverer of Taxol
- James D. Watson, co-discoverer of the structure of DNA; author of The Double Helix; winner of the 1962 Nobel Prize in Physiology or Medicine
- Silas Warner, game developer, creator of Wolfenstein

== Sports ==
- Gene Monahan, New York Yankees trainer, Hendrick Motorsports consultant
- Jeff Sagarin, statistician and creator of various Sagarin Rating Systems

== Other ==
- Jan Crull Jr., documentary filmmaker and attorney; Ph.D. student in English Language and Literature in late 1970s; dropped out
- Emily Harris, a founding member of Symbionese Liberation Army
- Jim Jones, Peoples Temple founder, cult leader and mass murderer
- Maxine Mesinger, gossip columnist
- Estella Armstrong O'Byrne, DAR president general
- Norris W. Overton, U.S. Air Force brigadier general

== Notable faculty ==
=== Notable former faculty ===
- Robert Agranoff (1936–2019), political scientist and public administration scholar
- David Aiken (1917–2011), opera singer; first baritone to appear on television with NBC's 1951 Hallmark Hall of Fame production of Amahl and the Night Visitors
- Martina Arroyo (1937―2926), operatic soprano
- John Casper Branner (1850–1922), geologist
- Yuri Bregel (1925–2016), pioneer of Central Asian Historical Studies in the West
- Otto Brendel (1901–1973), German art historian and scholar of Etruscan art and archaeology
- Herman T. Briscoe (1893–1960), chemist
- Hal E. Broxmeyer (1943/1944–2021), biologist
- James Buswell (1946–2021), violinist, chamber musician, conductor and educator
- Robert Francis Byrnes (1917–1997), Russian historian
- Lynton K. Caldwell (1913–2006), principal architect of the 1969 National Environmental Policy Act
- Matei Călinescu (1934–2009), Romanian literary critic
- Kenneth Neill Cameron (1908–1994), literary scholar
- Robert Daniel Carmichael (1879–1967), mathematician and discoverer of Carmichael numbers
- Chiao Chien (1935–2018), anthropologist and ethnologist
- Malcolm H. Chisholm (1945–2015), organo-transition metal chemist
- Katerina Clark (1941–2024), scholar of Soviet studies
- Romane Clark (1925–2007), philosopher known for his works on logic
- Ralph Erskine Cleland (1892–1971), former president of the Botanical Society of America; cytogeneticist and botanist
- Wilbur Adelman Cogshall (1874–1951), astronomer known for his work on visual binary stars and solar eclipse
- Dorrit Cohn (1924–2012), Austrian-born scholar of German and Comparative Literature
- Bruce Cole (1938–2018), art historian
- Phil Crane (1930–2014), U.S. congressman and political scientist
- Ernest R. Davidson, quantum chemist
- Roland Clark Davis (1902–1961), psychologist recognized for his innovation in instrumentation and measurement of electrophysiological phenomena
- Harry G. Day (1906–2007), chemist, helped in the development of Crest toothpaste
- Melvin Defleur (1923–2017), communications scholar
- Raymond J. DeMallie (1946–2021), anthropologist
- E. Talbot Donaldson (1910–1987), medieval English literature scholar
- Richard Dorson (1916–1981), folklorist
- Glanville Downey (1908–1991), historian, specializing in history of late antiquity
- Jon Michael Dunn (1941–2021), logician
- Frank K. Edmondson (1912–2008), astronomer
- Irvin Ehrenpreis (1920–1985), literary scholar
- Carl H. Eigenmann (1863–1927), ichthyologist who described over 150 species of fish with wife Rosa Smith Eigenmann
- Albert Elsen (1927–1995), art historian
- Mari Evans (1919–2017), poet, writer, and dramatis
- Ronald T. Farrar (1935–2020), journalist and academic
- Eileen Farrell (1920–2002), opera and concert singer, later professor of music at IU
- J. Rufus Fears (1945–2012), David Ross Boyd Professor of Classics and G.T. and Libby Blankenship Chair in the History of Liberty, the University of Oklahoma
- Robert H. Ferrell (1921–2018), historian and author
- Clifford Flanigan (1941–1993), professor of English, medievalist, and theatre historian
- Anis Fuleihan (1900–1970), composer, conductor and pianist
- Paul Gebhard (1917–2015), anthropologist; part of Alfred Kinsey's original research team
- Ronald Giere (1938–2020), philosopher of science
- Josef Gingold (1909–1995), violin teacher and founder of the International Violin Competition of Indianapolis
- Rona Goffen (1944–2004), art historian who specialized in Italian Renaissance art
- Jerome Hall (1901–1992), legal scholar
- John Gombojab Hangin (1921–1989), Chahar Mongol scholar
- Anna Granville Hatcher (1905–1978), linguist
- Donald E. Hattin (1928–2016), geologist and paleontologist
- John M. Hayes (1940–2017), biogeochemist
- Eliot S. Hearst (1932–2018), psychologist and professional chess player, Guggenheim Fellow
- Charles Bixler Heiser (1920–2010), botanist
- Cecilia Hennel Hendricks (1883–1969), English
- Cora Barbara Hennel (1886–1947), mathematician
- Gary M. Hieftje, analytical chemist
- Paul Hillier, choral conductor (most notably of Theatre of Voices)
- Ronald A. Hites (1942–2024), environmental chemist
- Charles J. Horowitz, theoretical nuclear physicist, emeritus Professor of Physics
- George Ivask (1907–1986), scholar of Russian literature
- David Starr Jordan (1851–1931), ichthyologist, educator and peace activist, and founding president of Stanford University
- György Kara (1935–2022), orientalist, philologist, and specialist in Mongol studies and Mongolian philology
- Winthrop Kellogg (1898–1972), comparative psychologist
- Alfred Kinsey (1894–1956), pioneer of the academic discipline of sexology in the United States, founder of the Kinsey Institute and the Kinsey Scale, author of the Kinsey Reports
- Daniel Kirkwood (1814–1895), astronomer known for his work on asteroids, discoverer of Kirkwood gaps
- Bob Knight (1940–2023), head coach of the Indiana Hoosiers men's basketball 1971–2000
- Jay Kochi (1927–2008), organometallic chemist
- Yusef Komunyakaa, Pulitzer Prize-winning poet
- Yanna Krupnikov, political scientist
- Franz N. D. Kurie (1907–1972), nuclear physicist
- John P. Lewis (1921–2010), economist, economic adviser appointed by John F. Kennedy
- Alfred R. Lindesmith (1905–1991), sociologist, author of The Addict and the Law
- Wu-chi Liu (1907–2002), scholar of Chinese literature
- Salvador Luria (1912–1991), pioneer of molecular biology, winner of the 1969 Nobel Prize in Physiology or Medicine
- William A. Millis (1870/1871–1942), educator
- John Harrison Minnick (1877–1966), educator
- Allan C. G. Mitchell (1902–1963), physicist
- Hermann Joseph Muller (1890–1967), geneticist, zoologist and winner of the 1946 Nobel Prize in Physiology or Medicine
- Roger G. Newton (1924–2018), physicist
- Thubten Jigme Norbu (1922–2008), Buddhist monk and professor of Central Eurasian Studies; elder brother of the Dalai Lama
- Milos Novotny, glycoscience
- Felix Johannes Oinas (1911–2004), Estonian folklorist, linguist, and translator
- Elinor Ostrom (1933–2012), Arthur F. Bentley Professor of Political Science, co-recipient of the 2009 Nobel Memorial Prize in Economic Sciences
- Schuyler F. Otteson (1917–2001), business administration and marketing
- Richard Owen (1810–1890), professor of natural sciences, second state geologist of Indiana, first president of Purdue University
- Jeffrey D. Palmer, molecular evolution, molecular phylogenetics and comparative genomics
- Vikram Pandit, CEO of Citigroup
- Charles S. Parmenter (1933–2025), chemist
- Dennis G. Peters (1937–2020), electrochemist
- Lisa Pratt, astrobiogist and biogeochemist who served as the 7th NASA Planet Protection officer
- Menahem Pressler (1923–2023), pianist who played in the Beaux Arts Trio
- John Rau (1949/1950–2025), business leadership
- Edward Alsworth Ross (1866–1951), sociologist, educator, and president of the American Sociological Society who crusaded against unfair labor practices against Chinese immigrants and was indirectly responsible for the establishment of the tenure system
- Scott Russell Sanders, essayist
- Sven-David Sandström (1942–2019), composer
- Thomas A. Sebeok (1920–2001), semiotician
- Gyorgy Sebok (1922–1999), pianist
- Denis Sinor (1916–2011), historian, former professor of Cambridge University, Central Asia scholar
- B.F. Skinner (1904–1990), psychologist, pioneer of operant conditioning model
- Carol Smith (1926–2021), voice teacher
- Raymond Smullyan (1919–2017), philosophy professor emeritus, logician, mathematician
- Elliot Sperling (1951–2017), scholar of Tibet
- Newton Phelps Stallknecht (1906–1981), philosopher
- János Starker (1924–2013), cellist
- Sheldon Stryker (1924–2016), sociologist
- Edwin Sutherland (1883–1950), one of the most influential criminologists of the 20th century
- James Alexander Thom (1933–2023), novelist, writer of historical fiction
- Stith Thompson (1885–1976), folklorist
- Hans Tischler (1915–2010), musicologist and composer
- Giorgio Tozzi (1923–2011), operatic bass and actor
- Bob Tully (1909–1981), coach
- Michael Uslan, producer of the Batman movies
- Charles F. Voegelin (1906–1986), linguist and anthropologist
- George M. von Furstenberg (1941/1942–2022), economist
- Paul Weatherwax (1888–1976), botanist
- Ernest Wenkert (1925–2014), organic chemist
- Kenneth P. Williams (1887–1958), mathematician and historian, author of Lincoln Finds a General
- Clark Wissler (1870–1947), anthropologist, ethnologist, and archaeologist
- Iannis Xenakis (1922–2001), composer
- Jerry Yeagley, coach of the Indiana Hoosiers men's soccer team 1974–2003 with an NCAA record 544 wins
- Virginia Zeani (1925–2023), operatic soprano
- Max August Zorn (1906–1993), mathematician and originator of Zorn's lemma

=== Notable current faculty ===
- Asma Afsaruddin, professor in the Department of Near Eastern Languages and Cultures
- David B. Allison, scientist, researcher
- David Audretsch, economist
- Edward Auer, pianist
- Kathleen Bardovi-Harlig, applied linguist
- Willis Barnstone, poet and translator
- Marcia Baron, Rudy Professor of Philosophy
- Abhijit Basu, geologist
- Joshua Bell, Grammy Award-winning violinist
- Katy Börner, engineer, specialist in data visualization
- Fritz Alwin Breithaupt, Provost Professor of Germanic Studies and Cognitive Science
- J. Peter Burkholder, musicologist
- James Campbell, clarinetist
- Jamsheed Choksy, researcher on Middle Eastern religion and culture
- Lynda Delph, biologist
- Richard DiMarchi, Linda & Jack Gill Chair in Biomolecular Sciences
- R. Kent Dybvig, computer scientist, creator of Chez Scheme
- Eli Eban, clarinetist and professor of music
- Michelle Facos, art historian
- Daniel P. Friedman, computer scientist
- Sumit Ganguly, political scientist, expert in South Asia
- Henry Glassie, folklorist, author; former member of President's Council for the Humanities
- Susan Gubar, literary scholar of feminist theory and literature
- Cindy Hmelo-Silver, learning scientist and Distinguished Professor
- Douglas Hofstadter, Pulitzer Prize winner; author of Gödel, Escher, Bach; IU professor of Cognitive Science
- Larry Humes, audiologist
- Dawn Johnsen, President Barack Obama's nominee for assistant attorney general for the Office of Legal Counsel
- Jorge V. José, physicist
- Lewis Kaplan, violinist, co-founder of the Bowdoin International Music Festival, professor at Juilliard School
- Alan Kostelecky, physicist
- Jaime Laredo, Grammy Award-winning violinist and conductor
- J. Scott Long, statistician
- Maurice Manning, poet
- John Holmes McDowell, professor of folklore studies, Latin American studies scholar
- Sylvia McNair, Grammy Award-winning soprano
- Vicky J. Meretsky, biologist, director of Environmental Master's Program
- Armin Moczek, evolutionary biologist
- James Naremore, film scholar
- William R. Newman, historian
- James L. Perry, Distinguished Professor of Public Affairs
- Krishnan Raghavachari, chemist
- Nazif Shahrani, anthropologist, professor of Central Eurasian Studies
- Sara E. Skrabalak, nanomaterials
- Olaf Sporns, professor of cognitive science, psychology, and neuroscience, worked at the Neurosciences Institute
- Carol Vaness, soprano
- Michael J. Wade, population structure and epistasis
- David Ward-Steinman, composer
- André Watts, Grammy Award-winning classical pianist
- Allen W. Wood, philosopher and scholar of Kant's moral philosophy
- Miriam Zolan, biologist

See also Category:Indiana University Bloomington faculty.
