= Pirog (disambiguation) =

Pirog is an Eastern Slavic pie consisting of dough with a sweet or savoury filling. It may also refer to:

== People ==
- Dmitry Pirog (born 1980), Russian boxer
- Maureen Pirog, American scholar and policy analyst
- Michał Piróg (born 1979), Polish dancer and television personality

== Other ==
- Piróg, a village in Poland
- Pirozhki, Eastern Slavic fried buns, a small version of pirog
- Pierogi, Polish and Ukrainian semicircular dumplings
- Pirogue, a boat
