= Charles Horowitz =

Charles Horowitz may refer to:

- Charles Horowitz (judge) (1905–1989), justice of the Washington Supreme Court
- Charles J. Horowitz (fl. 1970s–2020s), American theoretical nuclear physicist

== See also ==
- Charles Hurwitz (born 1940), American businessman and financier
