= David Reingold =

American sociologist and higher education administrator

David A. Reingold
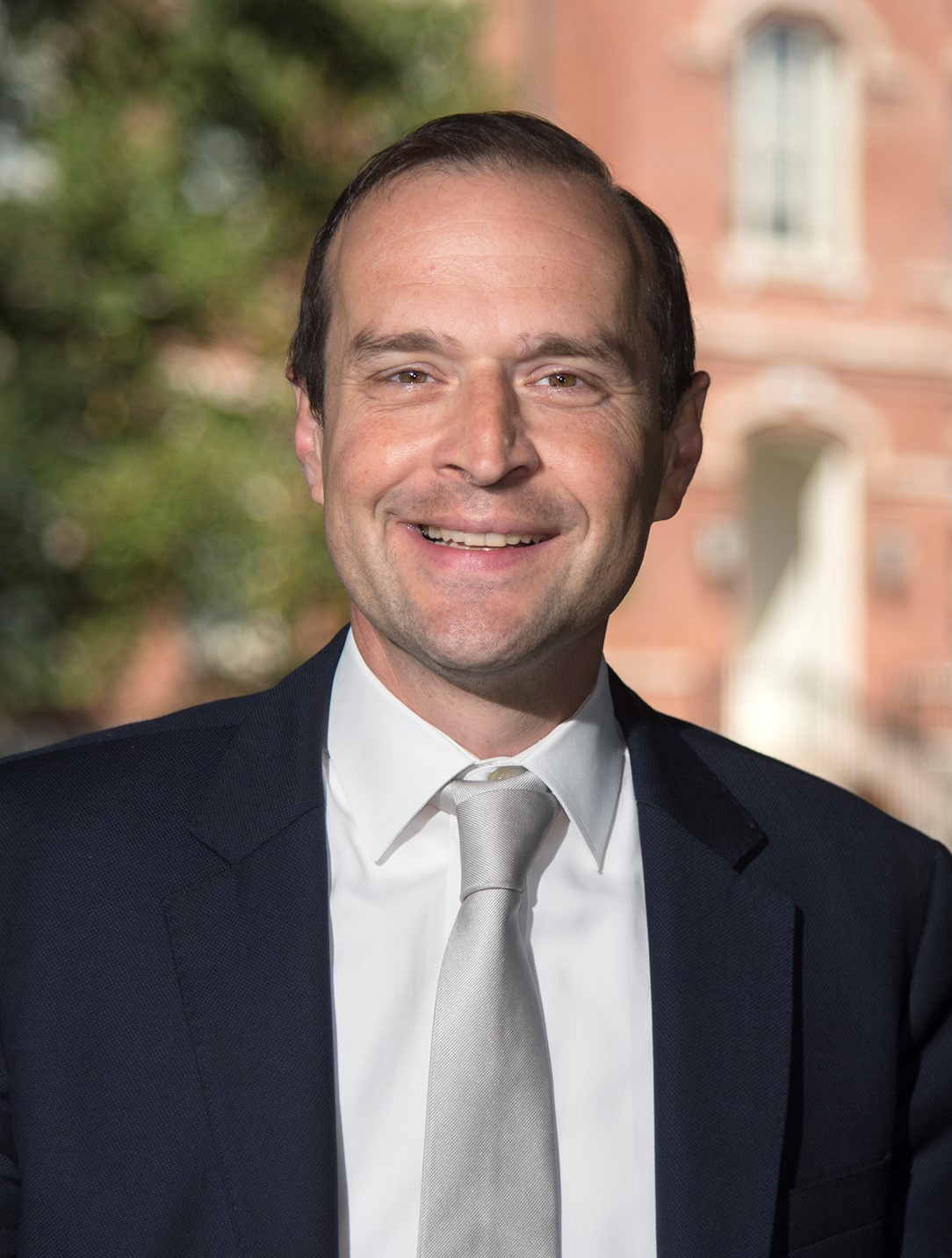
- Reingold in 2015

4th Chancellor of Indiana University Bloomington
- Incumbent
- Assumed office June 2, 2025
- President: Pamela Whitten
- Preceded by: Kenneth Gros Louis (acting) (Note: position re-created in 2025 after being dormant since 2006)

Personal details
- Born: 1968 (age 57–58) Chicago, Illinois, US
- Spouse: Lynn Hooker

Academic background
- Education: University of Wisconsin–Madison (BA); University of Chicago (MA, PhD)
- Thesis: Word-of-mouth employer recruitment and informal job brokering in an urban labor market (1996)
- Doctoral advisor: William Julius Wilson and Mark Granovetter and Richard Taub

Academic work
- Discipline: sociology
- Institutions: Purdue University; Indiana University

David A. Reingold (born 1968) is an American sociologist, currently serving as chancellor of Indiana University Bloomington since June 2025. He served as senior vice president for policy planning at Purdue University from 2023 to 2025.

== Early life and education ==
David Reingold was born in 1968 in Chicago, Illinois and grew up in the Hyde Park neighborhood. He attended the University of Chicago Laboratory High School.

He received a Bachelor of Arts from the University of Wisconsin–Madison, as well as a master's degree and a PhD degree in sociology from the University of Chicago in 1996.

== Career ==
He became an assistant professor at Indiana University’s School of Public and Environmental Affairs in 1997. He was promoted to associate professor with tenure in 2003 and to a professor in 2009.

At the School of Public and Environmental Affairs at Indiana University Bloomington, he was appointed as director of the Public Affairs and Public Policy PhD Programs in 2006 and as executive associate dean in 2008.

=== Purdue University ===
==== Dean of the College of Liberal Arts ====
In December 2014, Purdue University appointed Reingold as the next dean of the College of Liberal Arts, effective March 1, 2015.

Launched in Fall 2017 as a 15-credit certificate program, Purdue's Cornerstone program introduced a faculty-led first-year sequence centered on transformative texts to fulfill core communication requirements. He highlighted the value of general education at research universities and cited the Cornerstone program in a Washington Post op-ed.

Reingold led a successful effort to launch a bachelor of arts degree in music at Purdue, a first for the university. The Purdue Board of Trustees approved the new major in April 2021, followed by the Indiana Commission on Higher Education in May.

In 2021, Reingold effectively shuttered Purdue's creative writing program and its literary journal, Sycamore Review, which depends upon graduate students who staff the magazine. He did this by denying the department enough graduate students to keep the program afloat. Reingold's public statement claimed that the department had overspent its 2020-21 graduate budget and made additional commitments that would not allow for the admission of new graduate students in Fall 2022, despite no reduction in the department's graduate education budget from 2021-22 to 2022-23. He maintained that the English Department faculty and leadership will determine the future of the program and the literary journal. His claim that this was financially necessary was disputed by the English faculty and department.

In February 2022, Purdue approved jointly developed AI degrees, a B.A. from the Department of Philosophy and a B.S. from the Department of Computer Science, funded by a Lilly Endowment grant to integrate ethics and technology, with Reingold as principal investigator.

==== Senior vice president for policy planning ====
In 2023, he was appointed senior vice president for policy planning at Purdue University.

As senior vice president for policy planning, Reingold oversaw Purdue’s Civics Literacy graduation requirement, freedom of expression initiatives, the Purdue@DC program, and a critical thinking initiative. In June 2024, Purdue's Trustees reaffirmed the university's commitment to institutional neutrality as defined in a 1966 resolution incorporating the principles outlined in the University of Chicago's Kalven Report.

=== Indiana University Bloomington ===
In March 2025, Reingold was named chancellor of Indiana University Bloomington, effective June 2, a role that has not existed at IU Bloomington since 2006.

== Public service ==
From 2002 to 2004, he was director of the Office of Research and Policy Development for the U.S. Corporation for National and Community Service. He is a founding director of the Community Investment Fund of Indiana, a state-wide community development financial institution.
