= O'Neill School of Public and Environmental Affairs =

Public policy school in Bloomington and Indianapolis, Indiana, US

Coordinates: 39°10′21.2″N 86°31′3.8″W

Indiana University O'Neill School of Public and Environmental Affairs
- Type: Public public policy and environmental studies school
- Established: 1972; 54 years ago
- Parent institution: Indiana University
- Academic affiliations: TPC
- Dean: Siân Mooney
- Faculty: 90 full-time and more than 100 adjuncts
- Students: 2,850
- Location: Bloomington and Indianapolis, Indiana, United States
- Website: oneill.indiana.edu

The Paul H. O'Neill School of Public and Environmental Affairs is the public policy and environmental studies school of Indiana University with locations on both the Bloomington and Indianapolis campuses. It is the largest and highest-ranked public policy and environmental studies school of its kind in the United States. Founded in 1972, as the Indiana University School of Public and Environmental Affairs, it was the first school to combine public management, policy, and administration with the environmental sciences. O'Neill School Bloomington is the top ranked school of public affairs in the United States. The school received a facelift and expansion when the Paul O'Neill Graduate Center opened for classes in the Spring 2017 semester due to the growing influx of students. In 2019, the name was changed to the O'Neill School of Public and Environmental Affairs in honor of alumnus Paul H. O'Neill, who served as United States Secretary of the Treasury from 2001 to 2002.

The school of an affiliate member of the Association of Professional Schools of International Affairs.

== Rankings ==
In the 2023 "Best Graduate Schools" survey by U.S. News & World Report, O'Neill School (SPEA) Bloomington was ranked first in the U.S. among MPA programs. In terms of specialties, O'Neill School (SPEA) was ranked as follows:

- 1st in Environmental Policy and Management
- 1st in Nonprofit Management
- 1st in Public Finance and Budgeting
- 1st in Public Management & Leadership
- 4th in Public Policy Analysis
- 6th in Health Policy & Management
- 8th in Local Government Management
- 10th in Social Policy
- 14th in Urban Policy

In 2019, the Academic Ranking of World Universities ranked the O'Neill School as best in the world in the field of public administration.

== Student life ==
O'Neill School of Public and Environmental Affairs Bloomington supports the Civic Leaders Center, a residential facility for freshmen from across the Indiana University campus who are interested in politics, economics, public affairs and the environment. It is located at the Briscoe Residence Center.

Students have taken the initiative to organize several clubs such as the Nonprofit Management Association, the Environmental Management and Sustainable Development Association, Students Taking Active Roles Today (START), the International Public Affairs Association, Latin American Policy Association, and the Diversity Project, among others.

At IU Indianapolis, the O'Neill School advises and supports the Justice and Pre-Law Community for freshmen living in The Tower who are interested in social justice. O'Neill Indianapolis students also created and implement publicINreview, and online journal focusing on regional issues in public affairs. Select criminal justice students also serve as cadets on the campus police force.

In addition, the Graduate Student Association works closely between students, faculty and staff, to coordinate communication among them and offer opportunities for leadership and involvement to the school's masters students. Elected officers attend regular meetings with faculty and staff to discuss programs, policies and other aspects of the O'Neill School of Public and Environmental Affairs experience. Active members attend committee meetings and coordinate projects, trips, activities and parties. Every person in the professional masters programs at the O'Neill School in Bloomington is a member of the school's Graduate Student Association (GSA).

== Institutes and centers ==
- Public Policy Institute
- Manufacturing Policy Initiative
- Center for Research in Energy and the Environment
- Geographic Information Systems Laboratory
- The Great Lakes Center for Public Affairs and Administration
- Institute for Development Strategies
- Institute for Family and Social Responsibility
- Institute for the Study of Government and the Nonprofit Sector
- Transportation Research Center

== Global initiatives ==
- Vincent and Elinor Ostrom Workshop in Political Theory and Policy Analysis
- Transatlantic Policy Consortium

== Naming gift ==
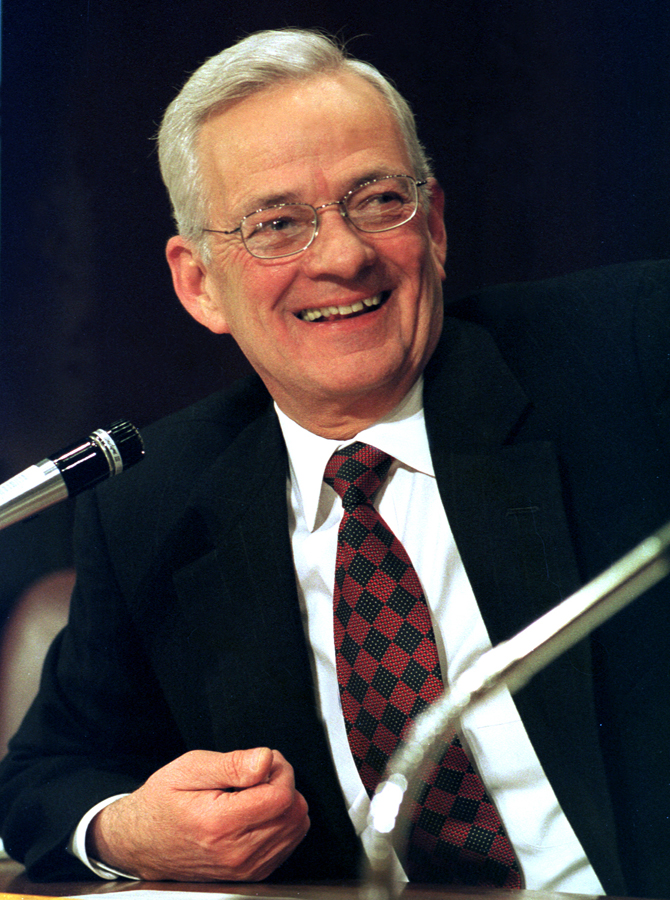
Paul O'Neill

On March 4, 2019, Indiana University announced the school would be renamed in honor of Paul H. O'Neill, a 1966 graduate of the university. In honor of O'Neill and his $30 million gift to the school, the School of Public and Environmental Affairs became the Paul H. O'Neill School of Public and Environmental Affairs. The gift will go toward funding graduate fellowships, professorships and chairs, undergraduate scholarships, and the creation of a new Center on Leadership in Public Service.

== Notable people ==
=== Faculty ===
- Robert Agranoff
- David B. Audretsch
- Shahzeen Attari
- Lynton Caldwell
- John Graham
- Lee H. Hamilton
- Robert Kravchuk
- Elinor Ostrom
- James L. Perry
- Maureen Pirog
- Edwardo Rhodes
- Kosali Simon
- Vicky J. Meretsky

=== Alumni ===
- John Fernandez
- Michael Harris
- Oksana Markarova
- Paul O'Neill
