= Michael Harris (public policy scholar) =

Israeli-American academic administrator

- מיכאל מייקל הריס
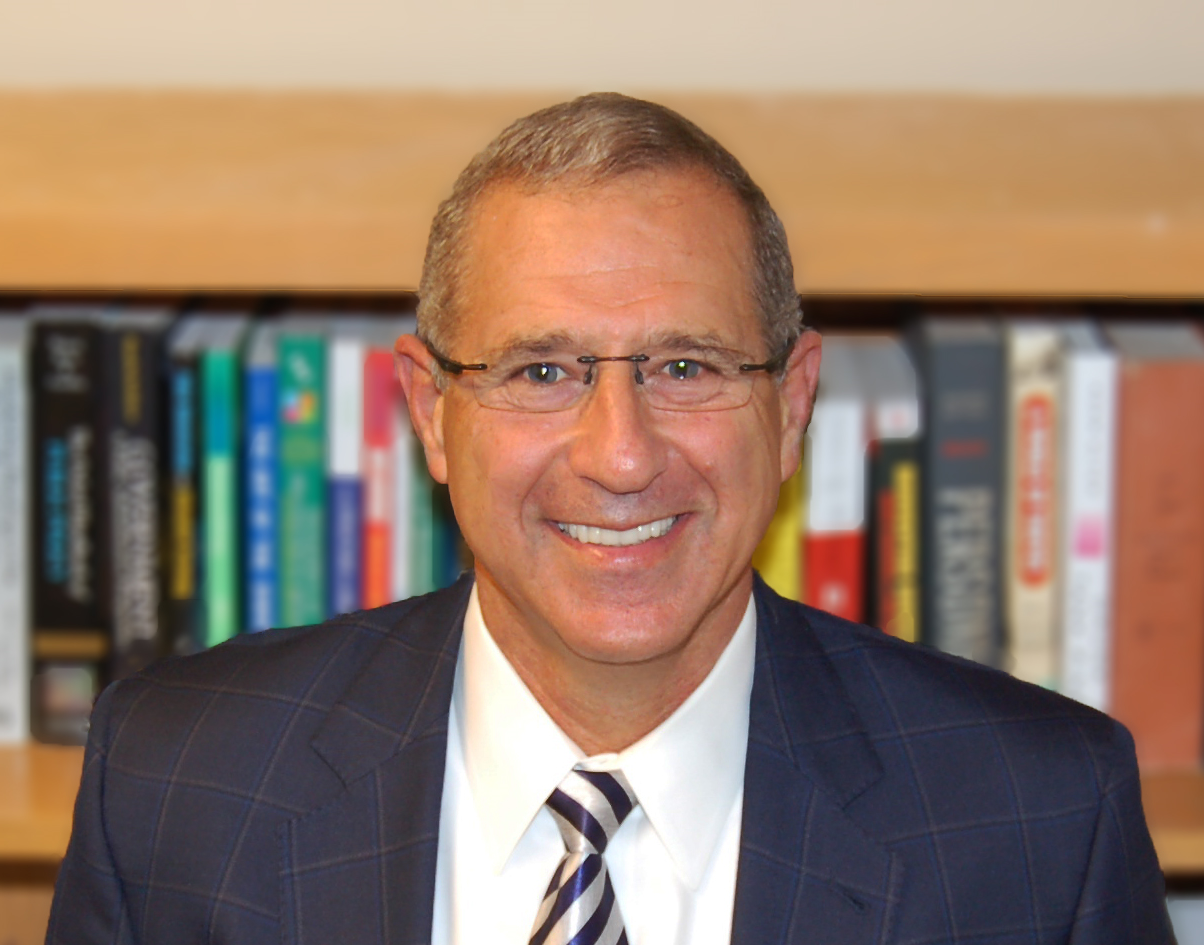

Personal details
- Born: Michael Harris; January 6, 1956 (age 70) Johannesburg, South Africa
- Spouse: Tali Harris
- Children: 3 sons
- Education: Bar-Ilan University; Tel Aviv University; Indiana University Bloomington (Ph.D)
- Occupation: Public Policy Scholar Tennessee State University
- Website: Website

Michael Harris (Hebrew: מיכאל (מייקל) הריס; born January 6, 1956) is an Israeli-American public policy scholar and retired university administrator. Harris served as the principal or co-principal investigator on many grants, published close to 100 peer-reviewed articles, and has written five books and several book chapters. Harris has held numerous academic leadership positions and oversaw several institutions organizational transformation and innovation.

== Biography, education and early career ==
Born in South Africa, Michael Harris immigrated with his family to Israel as a child. He was raised on the Moshav Shitufi Timorim in southern Israel, and is the eldest of three sons. He is married to Tali Harris.

Harris holds a bachelor's degree in economics and business administration from Bar-Ilan University (1982), a master's degree in public policy from Tel-Aviv University (1986), and a Ph.D. in public policy from Indiana University O'Neill School of Public and Environmental Affairs (SPEA). (1993). He completed two Harvard University College of Education Graduate programs on leadership and management. Harris served in the Israel Defense Forces and retired at the rank of major.

== Leadership and academic career ==
Michael Harris served as Interim Provost and Vice President for Academic Affairs of Tennessee State University until 2023 and a professor of Public Administration and Policy until 2024. Harris led Tennessee State University through the COVID-19 crisis and the university's ten-year re-accreditation by The Southern Association of Colleges and Schools Commission on Colleges (SACSCOC). Prior to being appointed Interim Provost and Executive Vice President for Academic Affairs, Harris was Dean of and Professor of Public Administration and Policy in the College of Public Service at Tennessee State University. He guided the college to its first ever appearance on US News 2019 rankings as one of the best public affairs programs in the nation. The college's Graduate Public Affairs program was ranked for a second consecutive time in 2020, securing the important distinction as the second highest ranked program at an HBCU with a NASPAA accredited graduate public affairs program.

Harris served as the sixth chancellor of Indiana University Kokomo (IU Kokomo) and a professor of public and environmental affairs, business, and education. Harris led IU Kokomo through the process of transformation adding 10 new degree programs to the Kokomo campus. Harris instituted online classes and increased enrollment. He also developed an athletic program, overseeing the development of four sports (men's basketball, men's cross country, women's cross country, and women's volleyball), which resulted in the university joining the National Association of Intercollegiate Athletics (NAIA) in 2012. Harris developed cutting-edge approaches for saving students money while ensuring timely degree completion, which earned national attention from organization such as the Lumina Foundation. During his time as Chancellor at IU Kokomo, Harris was appointed by Governor Mitch Daniels to serve on the Indiana Automotive Council. In January 2012, under the leadership of Michael Harris, IU Kokomo received a $1.25 million gift from Milt and Jean Cole to fund a new wellness and fitness center. At the time, this was the largest cash gift ever received on IU's Kokomo campus. The new facility, The Milt and Jean Cole Family Wellness and Fitness Center, opened in August, 2013. Under his leadership, U.S. News & World Report ranked Indiana University Kokomo among the best regional campuses in the Midwest, a first-ever mention for the campus that includes a Tier 1 level, and the only IU regional campus to receive this recognition. While serving as Chancellor, Harris was presented the Phoenix II (a sculpture and plaque) from the faculty, staff, and students of the university's fine arts program. Reflecting on his time as Chancellor at IU Kokomo, Kokomo Perspective Publisher, Don Wilson, said of Harris, "The university is much better off for his time here. Student housing, new degree programs, record enrollment, a new fitness center, the athletic program -- they all originated on his watch".

He also served as provost and vice president of academic affairs and student affairs at Kettering University (formerly GMI) in Flint, Michigan, from 2007 to 2010 During his time at Kettering, Harris built multiple partnerships and secured unprecedented grants and gifts, such as $1.65 million from the Wisconsin-based Kern Foundation to build American prosperity by shaping a new generation of entrepreneurial-minded engineers. While serving as Provost and Vice President of Academic Affairs at Kettering University, Harris was a leader in a collaborative effort among Swedish Biogas International, the City of Flint, Kettering University, and the Michigan Economic Development Corporation that resulted in $951,500 grant from the U.S. Department of Energy (DOE) to advance the production of biogas and biomethane at the Flint Center of Energy Excellence. Led the university's response to the 2008 financial crisis when students lost co-op assignments with General Motors and other employers. Since all students had co-op assignments, and the majority had lost those assignments, quick action was vital. Designed and oversaw the development of a plan for each student to be able to continue progress towards their degree in a timely manner. Harris also built partnerships with other Michigan colleges and universities to ensure that Kettering University students had the best opportunities. One such partnership was an agreement signed by Kettering University and Michigan State University College of Human Medicine, which provided an enhanced opportunity for Kettering pre-med students to attend medical school. Additionally, Harris was a vital member of the delegation that built unprecedented partnerships between Kettering and Chinese universities, government institutions, and businesses. In one of his final acts before leaving the university to become chancellor of Indiana University Kokomo, Harris led a four-hour negotiation session that resulted in Kettering becoming one of the first few universities in the world to form an agreement with the Chinese Automotive Technology and Research Center (CATARC), one of the most prestigious automotive research centers in China.

Harris was the vice president for academic affairs at Ferris State University (2004–2007), he was successful in strengthening the areas of academics, teaching, research, scholarship, retention, assessment, and service. Prior to joining Ferris State, he was a faculty member in the Department of Political Science and subsequently associate provost at Eastern Michigan University (1994–2004). During this time at Eastern Michigan, Harris was instrumental in vital efforts, such as overseeing the North Central Association, Higher Learning Commission Self-Study Steering Committee in his capacity as Interim Provost that resulted in the university's re-accreditation by NCA, HLC. While at Eastern Michigan University, he received the Michigan Association of Governing Boards Distinguished Faculty Award, which was an annual award to distinguished faculty and outstanding students “in recognition of a treasured Michigan resource and the promise it represents for our states’ future.” Harris also served as a faculty member in the Graduate Program of Public Policy at Tel Aviv University (1993-1994).

In 2012, the Hebrew-language newspaper, Maariv, named Harris as the most successful Israeli academic working outside of Israel. The Kokomo Perspective also named him their Person of the Year for 2011. As Chancellor, Harris was named Honorary Wing Commander of the 434th Air Refueling Wing by Grissom Air Reserve Base, which took place on February 12, 2012 and also included the honorary commanders participating in the Grissom Air Reserve Base's celebration of being designated a "Tree City USA" by the National Arbor Day Foundation. He also received the Best in Class 2009 Award from the Keen Entrepreneurship Education Network and an honorary doctorate in educational administration from Ave Maria College.

In 2015, Harris worked with the Tennessee Bureau of Investigation (TBI) to develop a unique certificate program, known as the Public Administration Executive Leadership Certificate or "Command College." In addition, he was named as a consultant to the Tennessee Bureau of Investigation. In 2020, Harris was appointed to the Nashville Downtown Partnership's board of directors.

== Published works ==
- The Learner-Centered Curriculum: Design and Implementation (with R. Cullen and R. Hill). San Francisco: Jossey-Bass, 2012. ISBN 978-1118049556
- Leading the Learner-Centered Campus: An Administrator's Framework for Improving Student Learning Outcomes (with R. Cullen). San Francisco: Jossey-Bass, 2010. ISBN 978-0470402986
- Innovation and Entrepreneurship in State and Local Government (ed. with R. Kinney). Lexington Books, 2003. ISBN 978-0739109267
- Term Limits (with G. Doron). Lexington Books, 2001. ISBN 978-0739102138
- Public Policy and Electoral Reform: The Case of Israel (with G. Doron). Lexington Books, 2000. ISBN 978-0739101346
