= Indiana University Kokomo =

Public university in Kokomo, Indiana, U.S.

Coordinates: 40.459822°N 86.131493°W

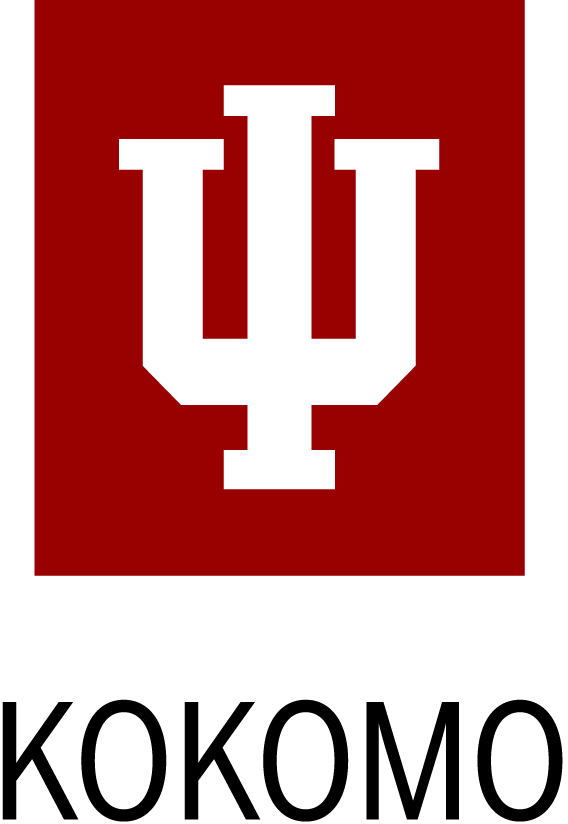
- Other names: IU Kokomo or IUK
- Former names: Kokomo Junior College (1932–1945)
- Motto: Fulfilling the Promise
- Type: Public regional baccalaureate college
- Established: 1932; 94 years ago
- Parent institution: Indiana University System
- Endowment: $7.7 million (2017)
- Chancellor: Mark Canada
- Academic staff: 210 academic staff, 20 executive/admin, 118 support staff (2014)
- Students: 3,029 (2017)
- Undergraduates: 2,724 (2014)
- Postgraduates: 114 (2011)
- Location: Kokomo, Indiana, U.S.
- Campus: Small city, 51 acres (21 ha) (2014)
- Colors: Cream & Crimson
- Nickname: Cougars
- Sporting affiliations: NAIA – River States
- Website: www.iuk.edu
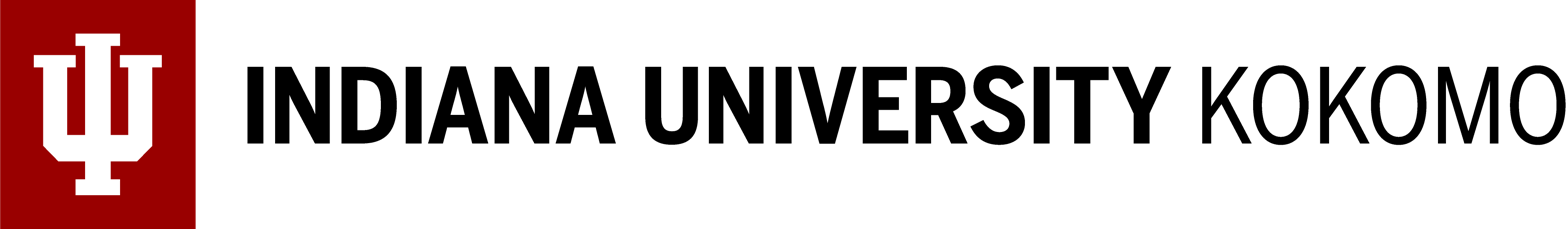

Indiana University Kokomo (IU Kokomo or IUK) is a public university in Kokomo, Indiana, United States. It is a regional campus of Indiana University serving north central Indiana.

== History ==
In 1932, John and George Beauchamp opened the Kokomo Junior College in the downtown YMCA. The Junior College offered a basic two-year collegiate program. It maintained an average enrollment of approximately 75 students. In 1945, it moved to 508 West Taylor Street, which was Indiana University's first building in the city of Kokomo. Indiana University Kokomo was officially established in 1945 as one of several extension centers of Indiana University (2012).

In 1947, students moved to a new location, West Sycamore Street, known as the Seiberling Mansion. The mansion, an adjacent home, the Elliot House, and its two carriage buildings served as the IU Kokomo campus for nearly twenty years. In 1965, IUK moved to its current location, south of historic downtown Kokomo, on Washington Street. The Main Building, the first building on campus, opened with classrooms, a library, administrative offices, and a 908-seat auditorium. In 1980, the East Building – now known for its Nursing Simulation Lab – was constructed.

In 1989, the Kelley Student Center was completed. Six years later, the modern library was opened. Purdue advisement offices and campus offices are housed in the west wing of the building, where PU:Technology-accredited courses are held. In 2001, Hunt Hall opened, a modern building used for science and mathematics and named after the school's first director Virgil Hunt and his wife Elizabeth. In 2010, IU Kokomo acquired an off-campus building which was once the Kokomo Post Office, and it has since been renamed the Fine Arts Building.

In August 2013, the Milt and Jean Cole Family Wellness and Fitness Center opened. The 21,000 square-foot facility includes a jogging and walking track, two multi-purpose rooms, and health studies room and lockers. It is partially supported from external donation. The center provides the opportunity for expanding Allied Health Programs such as sports medicine and athletic training. The center was officially named after the Milt and Jean Cole family in September 2013 to honor them for their donation of $1.25 million to the campus.

In August 2020, the Student Activities and Events Center opened. The 24,000 square-foot facility serves as the home of the Cougars athletic department. The facility was built to cut down the burden on the historic Memorial Gymnasium in which the Cougar Gym resides. It was the first structure to be built on the campus since Hunt Hall in 2002. The cost to build the facility was $8.4 million in which $250,000 was donated by the City of Kokomo. During the fall 2020 semester, the facility was used for a 96-seat social distanced classroom due to the COVID-19 pandemic.

=== Chancellors ===
- Virgil Hunt, executive secretary IU Extension Center, August 1945 – April 1956. Virgil Hunt served as the first administrator of the IU Kokomo Extension Center.
- Smith Higgins, director of IU Extension Center, 1956–1959. Smith Higgins led the extension center and later helped transform the many IU extension centers into regional campuses. In February 1959, Higgins took over responsibilities as associate dean of the Extension Division in Bloomington.
- Victor M. Bogle, chancellor, 1959–1979. Victor Bogle led the conversion of the IU extension center into a campus that offers associate and baccalaureate degrees to IU and Purdue University students. He oversaw construction of the original campus buildings in the 1960s and helped bestow the first degrees in the 1970s.
- Hugh Lee Thompson, chancellor, August 1980-July 1990, Ph.D. Hugh Lee Thompson doubled the size of the campus from 24 to 48 acres and he constructed the Kelley Student Center, the Purdue wing, and the Observatory. He established numerous scholarship endowments, which are currently the largest offered by the university. He also added fourteen Indiana University degrees as well as six Purdue University degrees while he was chancellor.
- Emita Brady Hill, chancellor, April 1991 – August 1999, Ph.D. Emita Brady Hill helped IU Kokomo grow by being a strong advocate in the building of IU Kokomo's library, Kresge auditorium and the Art Gallery.
- Ruth Janssen Person, chancellor, September 1999 – August 2008, Ph.D. Ruth Janssen Person helped lead IU Kokomo into becoming a full baccalaureate institution with the addition of bachelor's and master's programs and the elimination of most associate programs. During her tenure, many renovations occurred with classroom improvements, new lecture halls as well as technology making its way into the classroom. Ruth is also credited for overseeing the construction of Hunt Hall, which is IU Kokomo's award-winning science facility.(2008)
- Stuart Green, interim chancellor, 2008–2010, M.F.A. Stuart Green served 38 years at IU Kokomo. Throughout that time, he served many different leadership roles. He was a chairperson for the Department of Humanities, dean of the School of Arts and Sciences, and vice chancellor of academic affairs.
- Michael Harris, Public Policy Scholar, chancellor, 2010–2012, Ph.D. Michael Harris led the university through the process of adding 10 new degree programs to the Kokomo campus. Dr. Harris instituted online classes and increased the number of Friday classes offered. Under his leadership the campus reached historical enrollment records. He developed an athletic program. The first two sports (women's volleyball and men's basketball) led the university to a full offering of an athletic program with joining the National Association of Intercollegiate Athletics (NAIA) in 2012. In January 2012, under the leadership of Dr. Harris, IU Kokomo received a $1.25 million gift from Milt and Jean Cole to fund a new wellness and fitness center. At the time, this was the largest cash gift ever received on IU's Kokomo campus. The new facility; The Milt and Jean Cole Family Wellness and Fitness Center, opened in August, 2013.
- Susan Sciame-Giesecke, chancellor, April 15, 2014 – present, Ph.D. Susan Sciame-Giesecke has served the IU Kokomo campus for 35 years. In that time, she has directed strategic planning initiatives, started programs that will assist in the support of both student success and retention, and formed new degree programs.

== Academics ==
As of 2020, there were 3,123 undergraduate and graduate students enrolled at Indiana University Kokomo. The university serves a 14-county region in north central Indiana, and offers more than 60 Indiana University degrees, including bachelor's degrees in many arts and sciences medical imaging technology, criminal justice, and general studies; and master's degrees in public management, business, and nursing; and a limited number of associate degree programs.

IU Kokomo has a 16 to 1 student-faculty ratio (as of 2020).

In 2014, IU Kokomo was organized into the following schools and divisions:

- Division of Allied Health Sciences
- School of Business
- School of Education
- School of Humanities and Social Sciences
- School of Nursing
- School of Sciences

=== Accreditation ===
Indiana University Kokomo is accredited by the Higher Learning Commission. (2009)

=== Rankings and recognition ===
The Princeton Review includes Indiana University Kokomo as one of the 296 Best Business Schools in the 2015 edition.

The U.S. News & World Report's 2013 annual report listed Indiana University Kokomo as a top regional campus in the category of regional colleges that focus on undergraduate education but grant fewer than half their degrees in liberal arts disciplines. IU Kokomo was one of seven public institutions among the 74 that were ranked; IU Kokomo was the only IU regional campus to be recognized. This was a first-ever mention for the campus that includes the Tier 1 level.

== Student life ==
Indiana University Kokomo has approximately 35 student organizations, including special interest and major-based student groups. Specifically, there are a few groups that represent the interests of all students; Student Government Association (SGA), Student Union Board (SUB), Student Athletics and Wellness Board (SAWB), and The Correspondent student newspaper.

- Student Government Association provides leadership opportunities with three branches of government from which to serve.
- Student Union Board plans and supervises most of the social and entertainment events on campus.
- Student Athletics and Wellness Board supports the intercollegiate athletic program, organizes intramural sports, and promotes health and wellness on the IU Kokomo campus.
- The Correspondent is "The Student Voice of Indiana University Kokomo and Purdue College of Technology at Kokomo." It is a student-run paper that is released every two weeks.

The Nearly Naked Mile is a newer tradition, held in late fall each year to benefit Kokomo Urban Outreach. In order for students to participate in the one-mile walk/run each year, students must donate articles of clothing.

Annual events include a campus BBQ, Activities Fair, and Halloween Open House.

IU Kokomo sponsors annual awareness events to bring recognition and to show support to various serious issues. Deaf Awareness Week is a week where a silent lunch is held for an hour, where individuals are unable to communicate with one another. Sexual Assault Awareness Week at IU Kokomo teaches students to prevent themselves and others from becoming victims, and a self-defense workshop is set up for discussions on issues regarding sex, drugs and alcohol, two Step Up intervention training workshops, and a resource table for students. The annual "Block Out Breast Cancer" volleyball game raises awareness surrounding breast cancer. Fans attend the game wearing pink. Educational pamphlets are passed out to the attendees to inform them about the importance of early detection as a part of Breast Cancer Awareness Month.

=== Greek life ===
In 2003, IU Kokomo brought Greek life to campus with the colonization of a national sorority, Phi Sigma Sigma. In fall 2013, Phi Kappa Tau colonized at IU Kokomo and was the first NIC fraternity on campus.

== Athletics ==
The Indiana–Kokomo (IUK or IU Kokomo) athletic teams are called the Cougars. The university is a member of the National Association of Intercollegiate Athletics (NAIA), primarily competing in the River States Conference (RSC) since the 2013–14 academic year. The Cougars had previously competed as an Independent within the Association of Independent Institutions (AII) during the 2012–13 school year (when the school began its athletics program and joined the NAIA).

IU Kokomo competes in 14 intercollegiate varsity sports: Men's sports include baseball (2017–18), basketball (2011–12), cross country (2014–15), golf (2014–15) and track & field (indoor and outdoor); while women's sports include basketball (2014–15), cross country (2014–15), golf (2014–15), soccer (2019–20), tennis (2017–18), track & field (indoor and outdoor) and volleyball (2014–15).

=== History ===
IU Kokomo was one of four institutions to become a member of the NAIA in April 2012. In May 2013, it was announced that IU Kokomo was accepted into the league that was formerly known as the KIAC, beginning with the 2013–14 academic year. IU Kokomo became the 12th member of the KIAC. To remain a member of the NAIA, IU Kokomo must have six varsity sports within four years. In January 2014, it was announced that IU Kokomo would add both men and women's golf teams. Competition began during the 2015–16 season. In 2014, IU Kokomo was able to reach seven varsity sports; men's and women's basketball, men's and women's golf, women's volleyball, and men's and women's cross country.

In August 2012, IU Kokomo announced the addition of cheerleading on campus as a club sport. Cheerleading will not be a competitive sport or considered a part of the NAIA.
