= Shahzeen Attari =

Indian academic

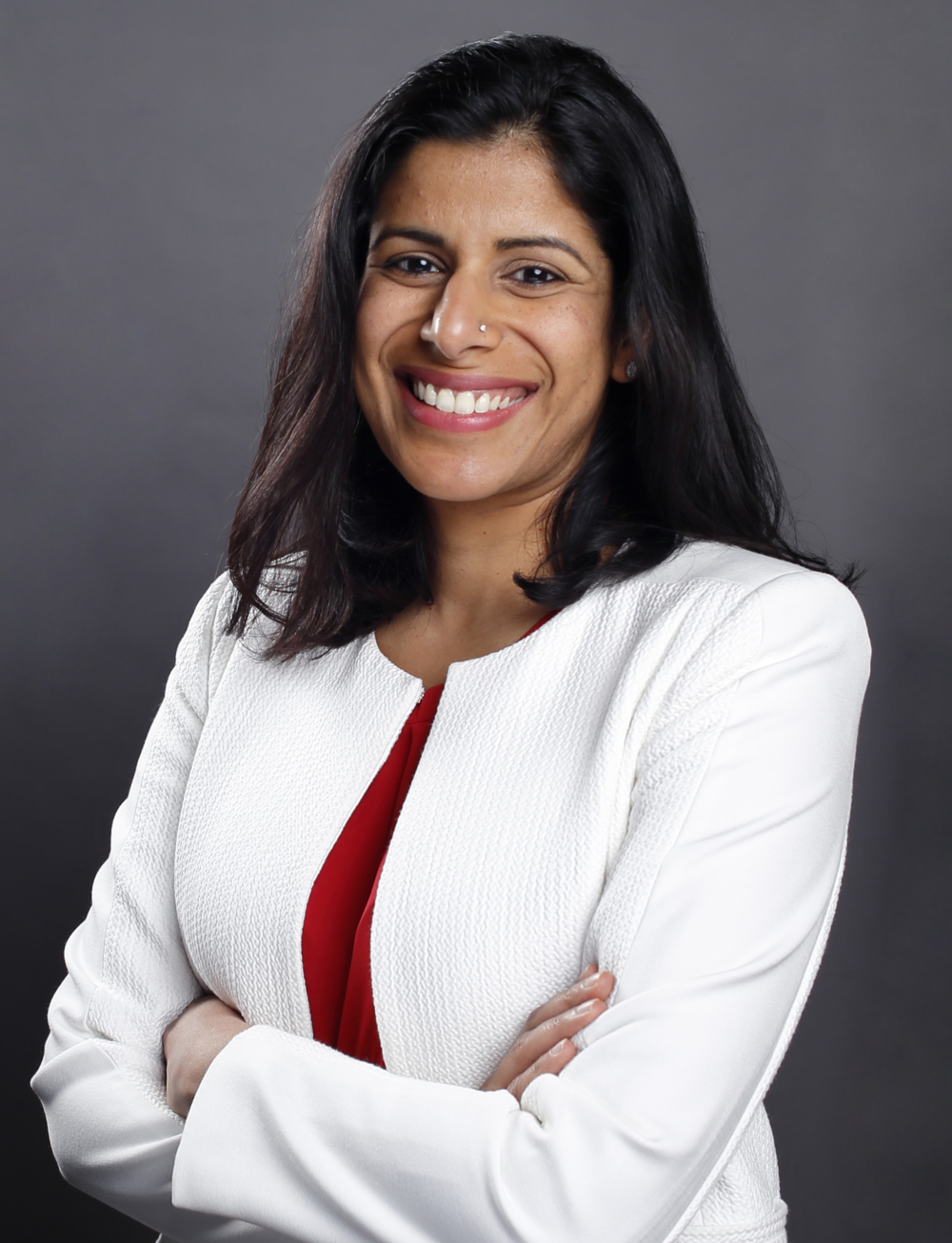
- Born: ca. 1981 (age 44–45); Mumbai, India
- Education: UIUC College of Engineering (B.S., 2004); Carnegie Mellon College of Engineering (M.S., 2005, Ph.D., 2009)
- Awards: Andrew Carnegie Fellow IU Bicentennial Professorship Center for Advanced Study in the Behavioral Sciences Fellowship
- Scientific career
- Fields: Engineering, Public Policy, and Psychology
- Thesis: Global Climate Change and Human Behavior: Decreasing Energy Consumption (2009)
- Website: www.szattari.com

Shahzeen Attari is a professor at the O'Neill School of Public and Environmental Affairs and the Director of the Institute for Advanced Study (IAS) at Indiana University Bloomington. She studies how and why people make the judgements and decisions they do with regards to resource use and how to motivate climate action. In 2018, Attari was selected as an Andrew Carnegie Fellow in recognition of her work addressing climate change. She was also a fellow at the Center for Advanced Study in the Behavioral Sciences (CASBS) from 2017 to 2018, and received a Bellagio Writing Fellowship in 2022.

== Early life and education ==
Shahzeen Attari was born in Mumbai, India and grew up in Dubai, United Arab Emirates. As she grew up, she witnessed first-hand how the desert transformed into a metropolis over the short span of time. In coming to understand the massive impacts humans can have on nature, Attari became drawn to work in the environmental sphere and human behavior.

Attari studied physics and math at the University of Illinois Urbana-Champaign Grainger College of Engineering, earning her B.S. in Engineering Physics in 2004. Drawn to interdisciplinary research, she then went on to earn her M.S. in Civil and Environmental Engineering from Carnegie Mellon College of Engineering in 2005, and her Ph.D. in Civil and Environmental Engineering & Engineering and Public Policy, also from Carnegie Mellon. Her dissertation assessed how demand-side management methods can mitigate carbon emissions. She completed her doctorate in 2009.

== Research and career ==
Attari is a professor at the O’Neill School of Public and Environmental Affairs at Indiana University Bloomington. Previously, she was a postdoctoral fellow at the Earth Institute at the Center for Research on Environmental Decisions (CRED) at Columbia University from 2009 to 2011.

=== Perceptions of energy and water ===
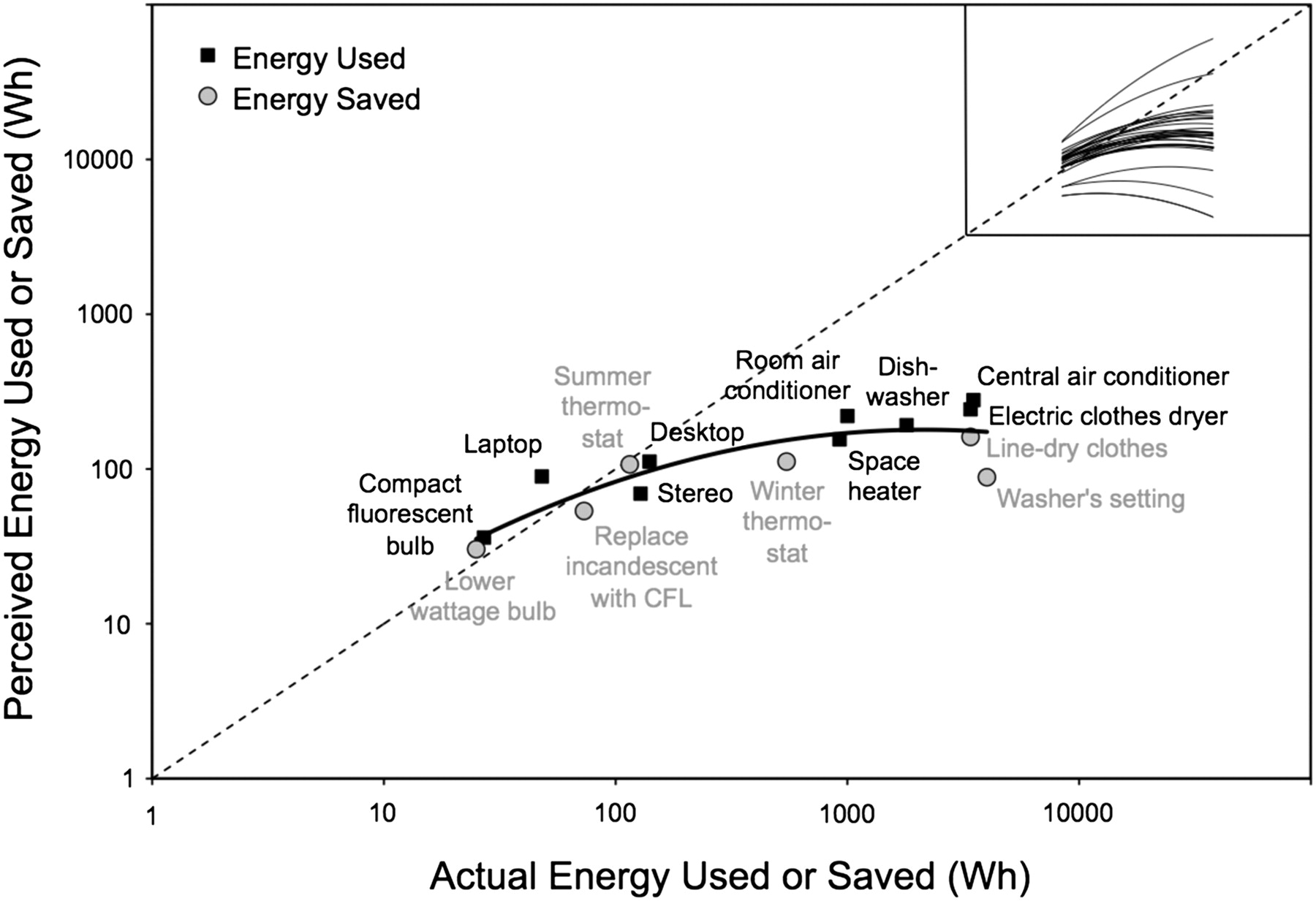
Mean perceptions of energy used or saved as a function of actual energy used or saved for 15 devices and activities. Error bars for 95% confidence intervals are omitted because they are typically no taller than the symbols themselves. The diagonal dashed line represents perfect accuracy. Inset: Individual regression curves for 30 randomly selected participants.

During her Ph.D., Attari conducted a study on how people perceive how much energy different appliances use. In this work Attari and colleagues found that for a sample of 15 activities, participants underestimated energy use and savings by a factor of 2.8 on average, with small overestimates for low-energy activities and large underestimates for high-energy activities. This study, published in the Proceedings of the National Academy of Sciences, highlighted the need for communication campaigns to correct these skewed perceptions and inform individuals of ways in which they can most successfully reduce their energy use. This study has been summarized by The Economist, The New York Times, and BBC.

Later Attari independently investigated how participants think about water use. In another study published in the Proceedings of the National Academy of Sciences, Attari showed that participants still favor curtailment (doing the same behavior but less of it) over efficiency (switching to more effective technologies that use less energy for the work needed to be done). For a sample of 17 activities, participants underestimated water use by a factor of 2 on average, with large underestimates for high water-use activities. Combining both her work on energy and water, Attari showed that perceptions of energy use are far worse than for water use.

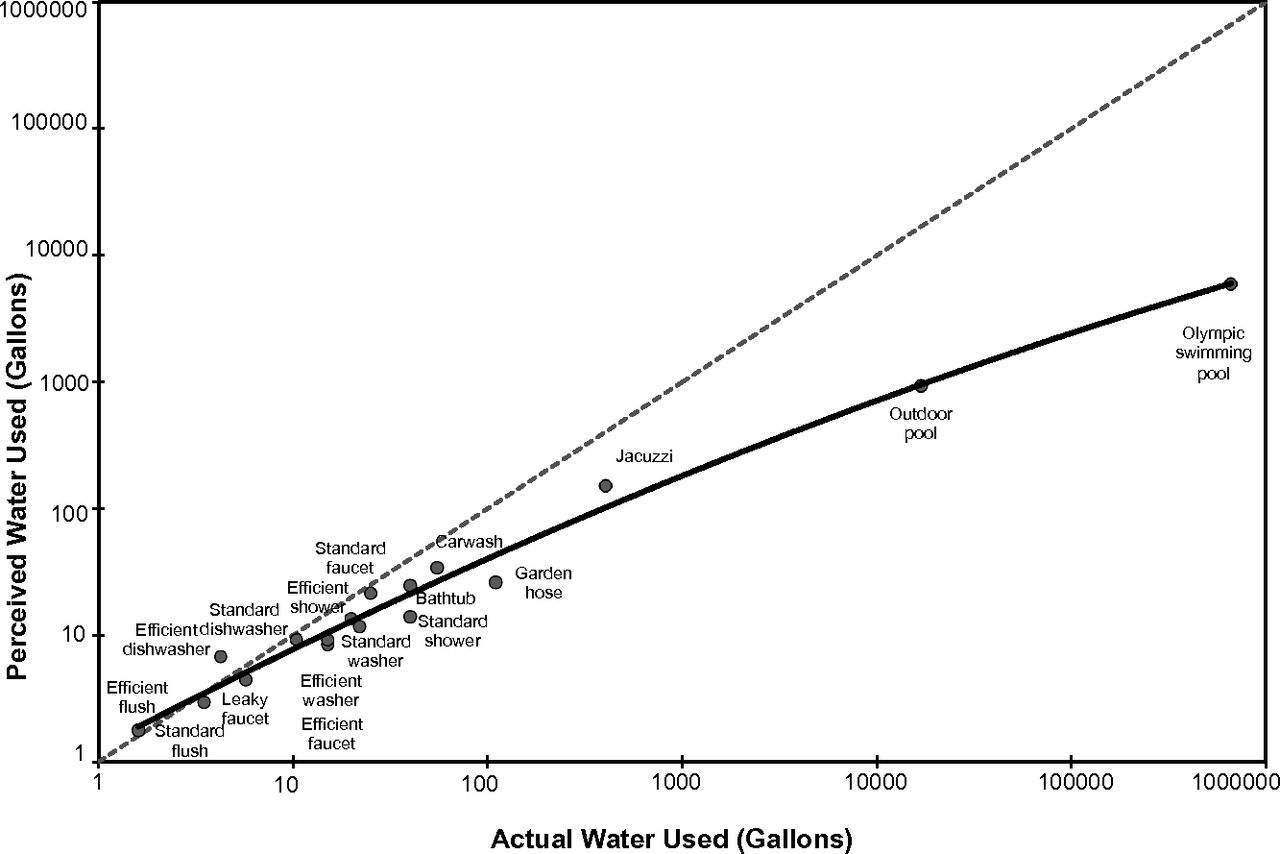
Mean perceptions of water and energy used as a function of actual water and energy used shown together. Data for energy perceptions are from Attari et al. 2010.

Overall, her work has found that participants consistently underestimate their water and energy use and know surprisingly little about which curtailment efforts will have the greatest impact on the environment. She presented these results at TEDx Bloomington, answering the question: why don’t people conserve energy and water?

=== Credibility and climate communication ===
Another line of research that Attari and collaborators have worked on is to understand the relationship between a climate communicator's carbon footprint and the effect of their advocacy on participants. They find that the communicators’ carbon footprint massively affects their credibility and intentions of their audience to conserve energy and also affects audience support for public policies advocated by the communicator. They also show that the negative effects of a large carbon footprint on credibility are greatly reduced if the communicator reforms their behavior by reducing their personal carbon footprints. The implications of these results are stark: effective communication of climate science and advocacy of both individual behavior change and public policy interventions are greatly helped when advocates lead the way by reducing their own carbon footprint.

With funding from the Andrew Carnegie Fellowship, Attari is conducting the following research project: Motivating climate change solutions by fusing facts and feelings.

Attari has assumed the role of both a scientist and activist, using her research to inspire greater change. She consistently gives public lectures and academic talks to communicate her research results and to advocate for solutions.

== Awards and grant ==
Her awards and honors:

- Andrew Carnegie Fellow
- Indiana University Bicentennial Professorship
- Center for Advanced Study in the Behavioral Sciences Fellowship
- SN10 – Among top ten scientists to watch under the age of 40, Science News
- Outstanding Junior Faculty Award, Indiana University
- Excellence in Teaching, Campus Catalyst Award, Office of Sustainability, Indiana University

Attari has received research grants from the following:

- Carnegie Corporation, Andrew Carnegie Fellowship
- National Science Foundation - Decision, Risk, and Management Science
- Environmental Resilience Institute, Indiana University's Prepared for Environmental Change Grand Challenge Initiative

== Selected publications ==
Her publications include:

- Shahzeen Z. Attari, David H. Krantz, & Elke U. Weber. (2019). Climate change communicators’ carbon footprints affect their audience's policy support. Climatic Change, 154(3–4), 529–545. [doi:10.1007/s10584-019-02463-0]
- Shahzeen Z. Attari, David H. Krantz, & Elke U. Weber (2016). Statements about climate researchers’ carbon footprints affect their credibility and the impact of their advice. Climatic Change, 138(1–2), 325–338. [doi:10.1007/s10584-016-1713-2]
- Benjamin D. Inskeep & Shahzeen Z. Attari (2014) The Water Shortlist, Environment: Science and Policy for Sustainable Development [doi:10.1080/00139157.2014.922375]
- Shahzeen Z. Attari (2014) Perceptions of Water Use, Proceedings of the National Academy of Sciences [doi:10.1073/pnas.1316402111]
- Jonathan E. Cook & Shahzeen Z. Attari (2012) Paying for What Was free: Lessons from the New York Times Paywall, Cyberpsychology, Behavior, and Social Networking [DOI: http://doi.org/10.1089/cyber.2012.0251]
- Shahzeen Z. Attari, Michael L. DeKay, Cliff I. Davidson, and Wändi Bruine de Bruin (2010) Public perceptions of energy consumption and savings, Proceedings of the National Academy of Sciences [doi:10.1073/pnas.1001509107]

== Personal life ==
Attari enjoys hiking with her dog, spicy food, and reading science fiction novels. She believes that science fiction books inspire us to reimagine the world we live in.
