= Alfred McAdams =

American painter

Alfred Hennen McAdams (November 1, 1914 – May 17, 2008 ) is an American painter.

McAdams was born in Louisville, Kentucky, in 1914. Originally, he planned on becoming an architect, getting his bachelor's in architecture from George Washington University in 1940. He also studied at the Chicago Art Institute and the Royal Swedish Academy of Arts in Stockholm from 1937 to 1938. During the Great Depression, he worked as an editorial assistant with the Federal Writer's Project and taught drafting in the National Youth Administration. For the duration of World War II, he worked as a draftsman with the Engineers at Trinidad, the British West Indies and Baltimore and as part of the United States Army Signal Corps in Europe. Gradually during this period, McAdams became more interested in painting, so he began taking night classes at the Corcoran School of Art. He also earned an Master of Fine Arts in painting from Indiana University in 1949. His background in architecture stood him in good stead, however, for he worked extensively as an exhibit designer at the United States Department of State, the United States Information Agency, and the Smithsonian Institution. He also spent time teaching at the University of Minnesota. In addition to the commission by the Bureau of Reclamation, McAdams was commissioned by NASA to record the Mercury space program. He has twice won awards from the Washington Watercolor Association.

McAdams's work is in the collection of the Smithsonian American Art Museum, National Air and Space Museum, and The Phillips Collection. In 2007, Gallery 222 in Leesburg, Virginia held an exhibition of his work. In 2013, the Rose Gallery held a retrospective of his work, Alfred Hennen McAdams 1914-2008 A Retrospective; a catalog was published in conjunction with the exhibit.
