= Wilbur Adelman Cogshall =

American astronomer

- Wilbur Adelman Cogshall from the Indiana University faculty and staff portraits.
- Born: February 8, 1874; Benton Harbor, Michigan, U.S.
- Died: October 5, 1951 (aged 77); Winnebago, Illinois, U.S.
- Education: Albion College (B.S.); Indiana University Bloomington (M.A.)
- Known for: Work on Visual Binary stars and solar eclipses
- Spouse: Harriet Sarah Bayliss
- Children: Wilbur B. Cogshall, Sarah L. Cogshall, Frederick John Cogshall
- Scientific career
- Fields: Astronomy
- Workplaces: Indiana University Bloomington, Lowell Observatory

Wilbur Adelman Cogshall (February 8, 1874 – October 5, 1951) was an American astronomer known for his work on visual binary stars and solar eclipses.

== Early life and education ==
Wilbur Adelman Cogshall was born on February 8, 1874, in Benton Harbor, Michigan, to Wilbur Israel Cogshall and Martha Leavitt. He completed his undergraduate studies at Albion College, earning a Bachelor of Science degree in 1895. In 1902, Cogshall obtained his master's degree from Indiana University Bloomington.

== Career ==
=== Early career ===
Cogshall began working at the Lowell Observatory in Flagstaff, Arizona, where he became an expert in measuring visual binary stars. His work there caught the attention of Indiana University Bloomington, which hired him in 1900 to assist with research using a new 12-inch refracting telescope at the Kirkwood Observatory.

=== Academic contributions ===
Cogshall was appointed an assistant professor of astronomy at Indiana University in 1904, and later became a full professor. He made significant contributions to the field of astronomy, including participating in four solar eclipse expeditions to study the solar corona. Cogshall was instrumental in building the Schwarzschild telescope near Bloomington, Indiana.

=== Notable achievements ===
In 1929, Cogshall served as the chief scientist for the U.S. Naval Observatory's solar eclipse expedition to the Philippine Islands. Cogshall oversaw the photographic observations of the solar eclipse of May 9, 1929.

== Personal life ==
Cogshall married Harriet Sarah Bayliss, and had three children: Wilbur Bayliss Cogshall, Sarah Louise Cogshall, and Frederick John Cogshall. Cogshall died on October 5, 1951, in Winnebago, Illinois.

== Legacy ==
Cogshall's work at Indiana University and his contributions to the study of visual binary stars and solar eclipses left a lasting impact on the field of astronomy. His research and achievements continue to be remembered and respected within the scientific community of astronomy.

== Sources ==
- "Kirkwood Observatory: History". Indiana University Bloomington.
- "Astronomy Tree: Wilbur Adelman Cogshall Family Tree". Academic Tree.
- "Wilbur Adelman Cogshall". Ancestry.com.
