= Elisabeth Joan Doyle =

American historian

Elisabeth Joan Doyle (April 22, 1922 – January 15, 2009) was an American historian, author, and educator who specialized in nineteenth-century American and British history.

Doyle was born in Chicago, Illinois to Michael B. Doyle and Mary Bowman Doyle. She attended Indiana University, Bloomington, and received an A.B. (1942) and A.M. (1948), both in history. The topic of her master's thesis was "The Congressional Career of Oscar W. Underwood of Alabama." She then became the first woman to receive a Ph.D. in Civil War history from Louisiana State University (1955). Her doctoral dissertation, "Civilian Life in Occupied New Orleans, 1862–1865," was supervised by T. Harry Williams. She also attended Oxford University during Summer 1959.

Doyle began her teaching career as an instructor at Marymount Junior College from 1955 to 1956, before becoming an assistant professor at Glenville State College (1956–1958), Wheeling College (1958–1961), and Southeast Louisiana College (1961–1964). Doyle then moved to St. John's University in New York, where she was an assistant professor (1964–1966) and then associate professor from 1966 until her retirement in 1978. At St. John's, she was editor of Humanitas of St. John's University (formerly known as the St. John's University Humanities Newsletter) from 1966 to 1972.

While teaching at Southeast Louisiana College, Doyle was also diocesan historian and archivist for the Diocese of Baton Rouge from 1962 to 1964. She prepared A Guide to Archival Materials Held by the Catholic Diocese of Baton Rouge, Department of History and Archives (1964).

Doyle contributed articles to Civil War History, Journal of Southern History, Louisiana Studies, and Mid-America, as well as a chapter to Congress Investigates: A Documented History, 1792-1974 (1975). She remained an active scholar long after her retirement, contributing book reviews to scholarly journals, as well as a chapter to Cross, Crozier, and Crucible: A Volume Celebrating the Bicentennial of a Catholic Diocese in Louisiana (1993).

After her retirement from St. John's, Doyle lived primarily in Covington, Louisiana, and volunteered as an Elder Hostess at St. Joseph's Abbey in Saint Benedict, Louisiana. She died at age 86 at Meadowood Retirement Community in Bloomington, Indiana, and was buried at Valhalla Memory Gardens in Bloomington.

== Publications ==
Major publications by Elisabeth Joan Doyle:

- Doyle, Elisabeth Joan. "Greenbacks, Car Tickets, and the Pot of Gold: The Effects of Wartime Occupation on the Business Life of New Orleans, 1861-1865." Civil War History 5, no. 4 (December 1959): 347-362, https://doi.org/10.1353/cwh.1959.0036
- Doyle, Elisabeth Joan. "Nurseries of Treason: Schools in Occupied New Orleans." Journal of Southern History 26, no. 2 (May 1960): 161-179, JSTOR, https://www.jstor.org/stable/2955181
- Doyle, Elisabeth Joan. "New Orleans Courts Under Military Occupation 1861-1865." Mid-America 42 (July 1960): 185-192.
- Doyle, Elisabeth Joan. A Guide to Archival Materials Held by the Catholic Diocese of Baton Rouge, Department of History and Archives. Baton Rouge, LA: Department of History and Archives, the Catholic Diocese of Baton Rouge, 1964.
- Doyle, Elisabeth Joan. "A Report on Civil War America: Sir James Fergusson's Five-Week Visit." Civil War History 12, no. 4 (December 1966): 347-362, https://doi.org/10.1353/cwh.1966.0066
- Doyle, Elisabeth Joan. "'Rottenness in Every Direction': The Stokes Investigation in Civil War New Orleans." Civil War History 18, no. 1 (March 1972): 24-41, https://doi.org/10.1353/cwh.1972.0087
- Doyle, Elisabeth Joan. "Zoé Campbell: A southern lady travels north in 1860." Louisiana Studies 13, no. 4 (Winter 1974): 313-344.
- Doyle, Joan. "On Access to Ph.D.'s." New York Times, 21 February 1975, 31.
- Doyle, Elisabeth Joan. "The Conduct of the War, 1861." In Arthur M. Schlesinger, Jr. and Roger Bruns (eds.), Congress Investigates: A Documented History, 1792-1974. New York: Chelsea House Publications, 1975, Vol. 2, 1197-1232.
- Doyle, Elisabeth Joan. "Bishop Auguste Marie Martin of Natchitoches and the Civil War." In Glenn R. Conrad, ed., Cross, Crozier, and Crucible: A Volume Celebrating the Bicentennial of a Catholic Diocese in Louisiana. New Orleans: The Archdiocese of New Orleans in cooperation with the Center for Louisiana Studies, 1993, 135-144.
