= Robert Agranoff =

American political scientist (1936–2019)

- Born: May 25, 1936; Minneapolis, Minnesota
- Died: November 14, 2019 (aged 83); Bloomington, Indiana
- Education: University of Wisconsin–River Falls; University of Pittsburgh
- Scientific career
- Institutions: Northern Illinois University; Indiana University

Robert Agranoff (May 25, 1936 – November 14, 2019) was an American political scientist and public administration scholar and author. A Professor Emeritus at the Indiana University School of Public and Environmental Affairs, Agranoff was best known for his contributions to the field of collaborative public management and intergovernmental management.

== Academic career ==
Robert Agranoff graduated as a Bachelor of Science in political science and economics from the University of Wisconsin–River Falls at River Falls in 1962. At the University of Pittsburgh, he received a Master of Arts (1963) and Ph.D. (1967) in political science. Between 1966 and 1980, Agranoff worked as a professor at Northern Illinois University and became an expert in the process of human services program integration.

In 1980, Agranoff joined the School of Public and Environmental Affairs (SPEA) at Indiana University. During his tenure at SPEA, Agranoff focused on the issue of intergovernmental collaboration including the dynamics of federalism and the characterization of public organizational networks. After acquiring Emeritus status in 2001, Agranoff maintained its activity in research, authoring and teaching.

== Books ==
Robert Agranoff is the author of the following books:

- The Management of Election Campaigns, 1976
- Dimensions of Services Integration: Service Delivery, Program Linkages, Policy Management, Organizational Structure, 1979 (Co-authored with Alex Pattakos)
- Intergovernmental Management: Human Services Problem Solving in Six Metropolitan Areas, 1986
- New Governance for Rural America: Creating Intergovernmental Partnerships, 1996 (Co-author)
- Collaborative Public Management: New Strategies for Local Governments, 2003
- Federalismo y Autonomía, 2004 (Co-authored with Enric Argullol, In Spanish)
- Managing Within Networks: Adding Value to Public Organizations, 2007
- Local Governments and their Intergovernmental Networks in Federalizing Spain, 2010 (Co-authored with Enric Argullol, In Spanish)

== Awards ==
- Louis Brownlow Book Award by the National Academy of Public Administration, 2003
- Fellow of the National Academy of Public Administration, 2011
- Martha Derthick Book Award by the American Political Science Association, 2014
