= Cecilia Hennel Hendricks =

Faculty member at Indiana University

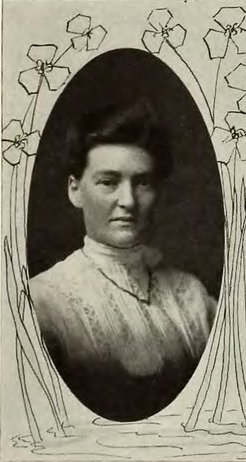
- Born: 2 March 1883; Evansville
- Died: 15 July 1969 (aged 86)
- Alma mater: Indiana University
- Employer: Indiana University Bloomington
- Relatives: Cora Barbara Hennel

Cecilia Hennel Hendricks (March 2, 1883 – July 15, 1969) was a faculty member at Indiana University Bloomington and a homesteader in Wyoming. She ran for the State Superintendent of Public Instruction in Wyoming in 1926.

== Biography ==
Cecilia Hennel was born in Evansville, Indiana, on March 2, 1883, to parents Joseph H. Thuman Hennel and Anna Marie Thuman Hennel. The Hennels moved from Evansville to Bloomington in 1905 so that their daughters Cora, Cecillia, and Edith could attend Indiana University.

== Personal life ==
On December 30, 1913, Cecilia married bee farmer John Hendricks and moved to Powell, Wyoming. Their courtship began as an epistolary relationship (pen pals) and their wedding was only the fourth time they had ever seen each other in person. Her detailed letters to her family were published in a 1986 collection entitled Letters from Honeyhill.

== Politics ==
In 1926, Hendricks ran as the Democratic candidate for the State Superintendent of Public Instruction in Wyoming. The same year, she campaigned for the re-election of Nellie Tayloe Ross, the first woman to be sworn in as governor of a U.S. state in 1924. Both Hendricks and Ross lost the elections and Hendricks returned to Indiana in 1931.

== Academia ==
Cecilia Hennel Hendricks received her BA and MA in English from Indiana University Bloomington in 1907 and 1908, respectively. While attending IU, Cecilia was an editor for the Arbutus, the school yearbook, and also made article contributions to several professional journals. She then served as a faculty member in the English department from 1908 to 1913, and later from 1930 to 1953. Her research interests included writing instruction, public education reform, and homesteading. Cecilia taught the first correspondence course at IU as well. She subsequently held the position of John Hay Whitney Professor at Coe College, and received career awards from IU and from the journalism association then known as Theta Sigma Phi.
