= Maureen Pirog =

American scholar and policy analyst

Maureen Pirog is an American scholar and policy analyst. A leading authority in family assistance, child support and poverty in the United States, she is the Rudy Professor of Policy Analysis at Indiana University School of Public and Environmental Affairs.

== Education and career ==
Pirog received a Bachelor of Arts and Master of Arts in economics from Boston College in 1975. In 1981, she earned a PhD in public policy analysis from the University of Pennsylvania. Pirog joined the Indiana University School of Public and Environmental Affairs (SPEA) as an assistant professor in 1983, being successively promoted to associate professor (1989), professor (1997) and the distinguished chair of Rudy Professor in 2004. Moreover, she holds visiting positions at the University of Washington Evans School of Public Affairs, the University of Johannesburg and the Higher School of Economics (Moscow, Russia). During her career, Pirog has become a renowned expert in evaluation of social policies and programs, particularly in the areas of family and child support, poverty fight and education. Indeed, she is the founder director of the Indiana University Institute for Family and Social Responsibility.

Between 2004 and 2014, Pirog was the editor-in-chief of the Journal of Policy Analysis and Management and led the journal's JPAM Classics.

== Publications ==
Pirog is the author or editor of the following books, besides more than four dozens of academic journal articles.

- Violence in Dating Relationships: Emerging Social Issues (1989, co-editor with Jan Stets)
- Cost-Benefit Analysis and Public Policy (2008, co-editor with David Weimer)
- Social Experimentation, Program Evaluation and Public Policy (2008, editor)
- Poverty, Welfare and Public Policy (2010, co-editor with Douglas Besharov and Douglas Call)
- Public Management (2011, co-editor with Lawrence Lynn)
- Public Policy and Mental Health: Avenues for Prevention (2012, co-authored with Emily Good)
