= Wendy Boss =

American botanist

Wendy Farmer Boss is an American botanist and the current William Neal Reynolds Distinguished Professor Emeritus at North Carolina State University. Her research focuses on plant physiology and phosphoinositide mediated signalling in plants. Phosphoinositols are derived from the phospholipids found in plasma membrane of the cell. Phosphoinositols are known to be key molecules in signal transduction pathways. The role of this chemical in plants is however not well understood and Dr. Boss' research has contributed significantly towards understanding this topic.

== Early life and education ==
Boss received her Bachelor of Science degree from Wake Forest University in 1968. Subsequently, she completed a Master of Science in 1970 from University of Washington. She was awarded a Doctorate of Philosophy from Indiana University Bloomington in 1977.

== Career and research ==
The Boss lab works on phosphoinositide metabolism in plants. Primarily, the research focuses on the role of the chemicals phosphatidyl-inositol-4P and phosphatidyl-inositol-4,5P_{2} in signal transduction in plants while adapting to environmental changes. In 2001 Dr. Boss received grants from NASA, National Science Foundation and the United States Department of Agriculture's Binational Agricultural Research Development (BARD) program to study the role of this chemicals in plants grown in space. The research measured the chemical surges occurring in plant cells moments after the plant is reoriented and the response time required by plants to adapt to the reorientation.

== Honors and awards ==
- Inaugural fellow of American Society of Plant Biologists, 2007
- Charles Reid Barnes Life membership award, 2015 awarded by American Society of Plant Biologists
- William Neal Reynolds Distinguished Professor Emeritus at the North Carolina State University
- Pioneer Member of the American Society of Plant Biologists.
