= Miriam Zolan =

American biologist

Academic work
- Discipline: Biology
- Institutions: Indiana University

Miriam Zolan is an American biologist, currently at Indiana University and an Elected Fellow of the American Association for the Advancement of Science.
