= Cora Barbara Hennel =

Indiana mathematician

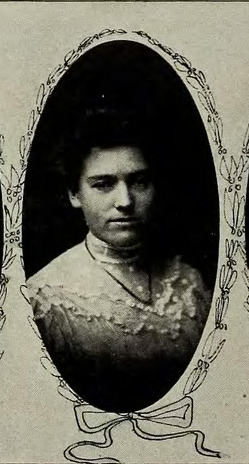
Hennel from a 1921 Indiana University yearbook

Cora Barbara Hennel (January 21, 1886 – June 26, 1947) was an Indiana mathematician active in the first half of the 20th century.

== Early life and education ==
Hennel was born in Evansville, Indiana to Joseph H. and Anna Marie Thuman Hennel. After high school graduation Cora and her older sister Cecilia taught in country grade schools to save money for college. In 1903, both Hennels entered Indiana University Bloomington and shortly thereafter, convinced their parents to move with their younger sister, Edith, to Bloomington. All three sisters attended and graduated from Indiana University. Hennel earned her earned her A.B. in Mathematics in 1907, her Masters in 1908, and in 1912, became the first person to earn a Ph.D. in Mathematics from Indiana University. As an undergraduate, Cora was the class poet and active in student affairs; in graduate school, she was a founding member and Secretary of the Euclidean Circle, a mathematics club for faculty and students.

== Career ==
As she worked toward her doctorate, Cora served as Instructor in the Department of Mathematics. She continued in this role after receipt of her degree and in 1916, she was appointed Assistant Professor of Mathematics. She was promoted to Associate Professor in 1923 and became a full Professor in 1936. Hennel spent the entirety of her academic career at Indiana University and was still teaching at the time of her death in 1947.

Hennel was an active member of the Indiana University faculty, serving as president of the Bloomington chapter of the American Association of University Professors, the American Association of University Women and served as chair of the Indiana Section of the Mathematical Association of America. Professionally, she was a member of Phi Beta Kappa, Sigma Xi, Pi Lambda Theta, Mortar Board, and the Indiana Academy of Sciences.

== Honors and tributes ==
In 1958, Cecilia Hennel established the Cora B. Hennel Memorial Scholarship to honor her sister. The Hennel Scholarships are awarded to students who have demonstrated high ability in mathematics. The department continues to remember Hennel and in 1995, named the faculty/student lounge in the renovated Rawles Hall the Cora B. Hennel Room.

== Selected published works ==
- "Transformations and Invariants Connected with Linear Homogeneous Difference Equations and other Functional Equations" in American Journal of Mathematics 35, no. 4 (1913): 431–52
- A Course in General Mathematics (1925), co-authored with Harold T. Davis
