= John Harrison Minnick =

American educator

John Harrison Minnick (born October 16, 1877–1966) was an American educator, born at Somerset, Indiana.

Minnick graduated from Indiana University Bloomington with an A.B. degree in 1906 and A.M. degree in 1908. He was also educated at the University of Illinois at Urbana-Champaign, the University of Chicago, and other universities. For several years he taught in high schools in Indiana and Illinois, and from 1911 to 1913 he was critic teacher of mathematics at Indiana University Bloomington. For two years following he was instructor in mathematics at the Horace Mann School at New York City. In 1916 he became instructor of mathematics in the University of Pennsylvania and was successively assistant professor of education, professor of education, and dean of the school of education at that university. He was a member of many learned societies, wrote An Investigation of Abilities Fundamental to Geometry (1918), and developed standardized tests in geometry.
