= Charles J. Horowitz =

American theoretical nuclear physicist

- Education: Harvey Mudd College (B.S., 1978); Stanford University (Ph.D., 1981)
- Known for: Neutron-star matter; Nuclear pasta; PREX experiment; Neutrino–nucleus interactions
- Awards: APS Fellow (2008); APS Division of Nuclear Physics Mentoring Award (2023)
- Scientific career
- Fields: Nuclear physics; Astrophysics
- Workplaces: Stanford University; Massachusetts Institute of Technology; Indiana University Bloomington
- Thesis: Structure of Nuclei in a Relativistic Meson–Baryon Quantum Field Theory (1981)
- Doctoral advisor: John Dirk Walecka

Charles J. Horowitz is an American theoretical nuclear physicist known for his research on neutron-rich matter, neutron-star structure, neutrino interactions, and parity-violating electron scattering. He is an emeritus Professor of Physics at Indiana University Bloomington.

== Early life and education ==
Horowitz earned a Bachelor of Science degree from Harvey Mudd College in 1978. He completed his Ph.D. at Stanford University in 1981, specializing in theoretical nuclear physics.

After receiving his doctorate, he held a postdoctoral research appointment at the Niels Bohr Institute in Copenhagen.

== Academic career ==
Horowitz began his academic career as an assistant professor at the Massachusetts Institute of Technology in 1984. He joined the faculty of Indiana University Bloomington in 1987 as an associate professor, received tenure in 1989, and was promoted to full professor in 1991. where he conducted research and taught for nearly four decades. He became emeritus Professor of Physics after retirement.

Horowitz has participated in several major national nuclear-physics and astrophysics collaborations. He has been involved in the Lead Radius Experiment (PREX) at Jefferson Lab through his work on parity-violating electron scattering and neutron-skin measurements. His simulations and theoretical studies of neutron-star crusts and dense matter have been highlighted in national research announcements, including a press release describing his findings on the strength of neutron-star crust material. He also contributes to NSF-supported multi-institutional efforts studying neutron-star mergers and dense-matter equations of state, as noted in an Indiana University press release on the university's role in a national neutron-star research hub.

== Research ==
Horowitz's work spans nuclear theory, astrophysics, and computational modeling.

=== Neutron-star matter and the equation of state ===
Horowitz has made contributions to understanding dense nuclear matter and the internal structure of neutron stars. His large-scale molecular-dynamics simulations demonstrated that neutron-star crust may be "10 billion times stronger than steel," a finding highlighted in multiple science-news outlets and press releases.

His simulations predicted exotic phases of neutron-star crust known as nuclear pasta, including shapes described as "waffles," "lasagna," and "spaghetti," which have been covered in the science media.

These studies indicate that nuclear-pasta phases may be among the strongest materials in the universe, with implications for neutron-star oscillations, crust breaking strain, and potential gravitational-wave emission.

Horowitz's theoretical and phenomenological work on the equation of state of dense matter has contributed to neutron-star structure studies that interface nuclear-physics models with astronomical observations and gravitational-wave constraints.

=== Parity-violating electron scattering ===
Horowitz played a theoretical role in the PREX (Lead Radius Experiment) collaboration, which used parity-violating electron scattering to measure the neutron-skin thickness of lead-208. PREX provides an independent experimental constraint on neutron distributions in heavy nuclei, with implications for nuclear structure and neutron-star radii.

=== Neutrino and weak interactions ===
Horowitz has published on:

- neutrino–nucleus scattering,
- weak probes of nuclear structure,
- and neutrino transport in astrophysical environments.

His work on nuclear pasta, neutron-star crust physics, and neutrino interactions has also been covered in mainstream popular-science outlets and university press releases.

== Awards ==
- APS Fellow (2008), elected for seminal and sustained contributions to relativistic descriptions of nuclei, nuclear reactions, and dense matter.
- APS Division of Nuclear Physics Mentoring Award (2023)
