= Romane Clark =

American philosopher (1925–2007)

- Born: Romane Lewis Clark; December 3, 1925; Waverly, Iowa, U.S.
- Died: August 17, 2007 (aged 81); Bloomington, Indiana, U.S.

Education
- Education: University of Iowa (B.A. 1949; M.A. 1950; Ph.D., 1952)

Philosophical work
- Era: 21st-century philosophy
- Region: Western philosophy
- School: Analytic philosophy
- Institutions: Indiana University, Bloomington
- Main interests: Philosophy of logic
- Notable ideas: Clark's paradox

Romane Lewis Clark (December 3, 1925 – August 17, 2007) was an American philosopher and Professor Emeritus of Philosophy at Indiana University, Bloomington. He is known for his works on logic, especially his eponymous paradox (Clark's paradox).

== Books ==
- Romane Clark and Paul Welsh, Introduction to Logic, Princeton, N.J., Toronto, New York, London: D. Van Nostrana Company, Inc., 1962.
