= The Kokomo Perspective =

Defunct weekly newspaper in Kokomo, Indiana

- Type: Weekly newspaper
- Format: Berliner
- Owner: Brian Oaks
- Publisher: Don Wilson
- Founded: August 1989
- Ceased publication: November 29, 2021
- Language: English
- Headquarters: 209 North Main Street, Kokomo, Indiana 46901 USA
- Circulation: 31,000
- Website: kokomoperspective.com (defunct)

The Kokomo Perspective was a weekly newspaper serving Kokomo, Indiana, established in August 1989. It ceased operating on November 29, 2021. The Perspective was distributed for free to 31,000 homes every Wednesday. Its rival was the Kokomo Tribune.

== History ==
The paper published public vitals each week, providing information about citizens' court happenings, arrests, mug shots, marriages, divorces, causes of death, and obituaries. The section was one of the most popular sections of the paper.

One of the publication's overriding goals was to foster public awareness of the political process and to mobilize the citizens of Howard County, of which Kokomo is the county seat, to participate in electing local officials. In 2004, after publisher and editor Don Wilson had written articles pointing out that Howard County Prosecutor Jim Fleming "did not have enough integrity to keep the majority of his campaign promises", Fleming launched what he called the biggest gambling case in Howard County history, eventually filing 11 felony charges against Wilson and his business partner; Fleming refused to recuse himself from the case. In 2006, after two years of Fleming using "taxpayer-funded resources to fuel his own personal vendetta", the case had been transferred to Grant County, where that county's prosecutor dropped all charges against Wilson and all felony charges against his partner, who was convicted on a single misdemeanor – for pocketing $18 in profit from handling betting on horse racing at Hoosier Park three times a year amongst friends at the local American Legion hall. While Hossier park does offer off-track betting in various Indiana locations, it did not have a storefront in Kokomo, which is 55 miles (89 km) from the track.

In January 2017, local attorney Brian Oaks bought part ownership of The Kokomo Perspective with plans to fully purchase the business down the road. Don Wilson was the publisher for the next several years. In March 2017, Brian Oaks also purchased the weekly Kokomo Herald.

In June 2017, the paper switched to being delivered via the United States Postal Service versus carriers to ensure reliable delivery every week. The paper size also was changed to the Berliner format, which is slightly narrower and shorter than the broadsheet format.

In 2021, the newspaper closed.
