= Ghoulem Berrah =

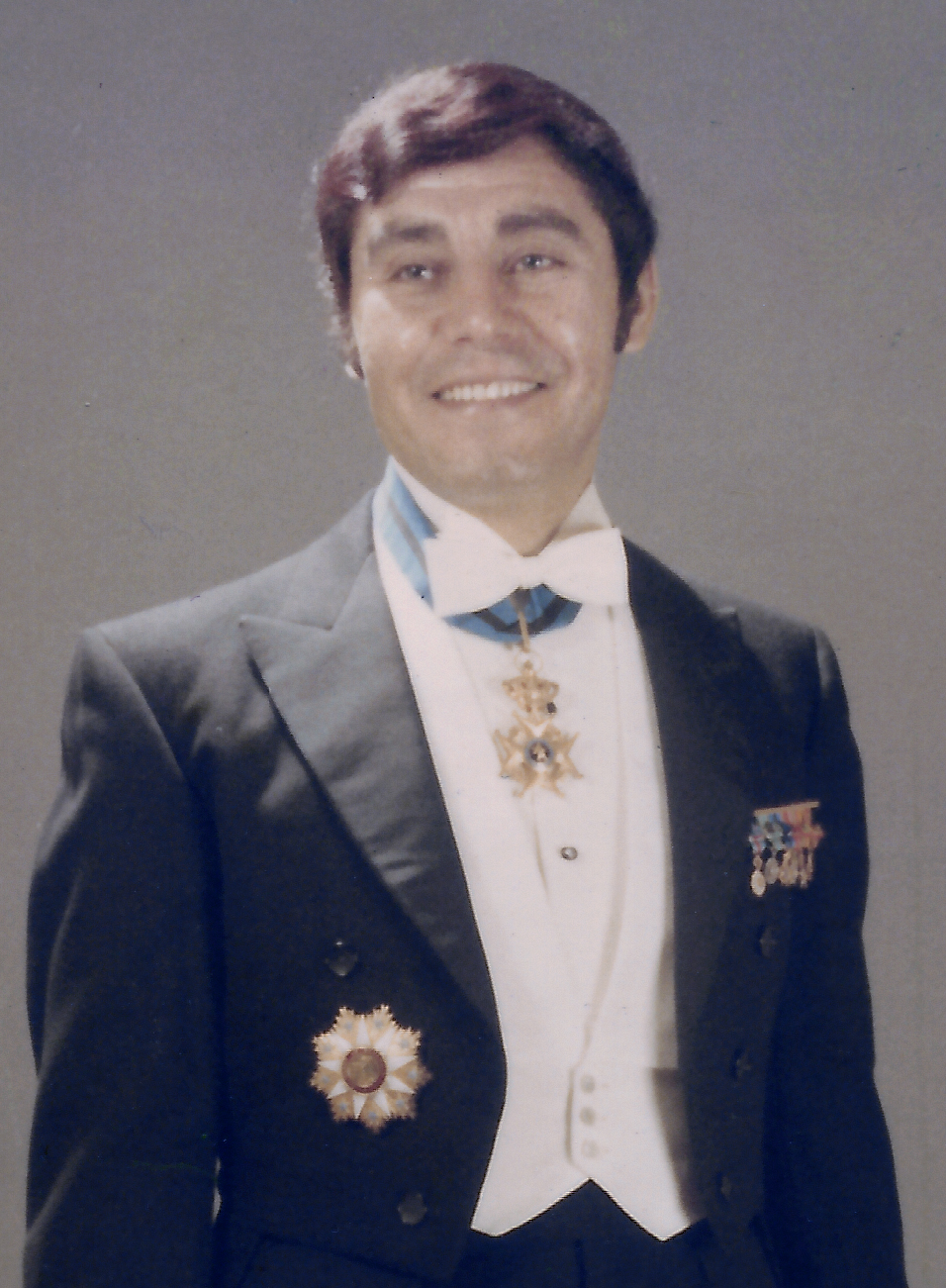
- Born: May 29, 1938; Aïn Beïda, Algeria
- Died: March 4, 2011 (aged 72); Miami, Florida
- Education: Indiana University, Bloomington
- Occupations: Ambassador; Microbiologist; Physician

Ghoulem Berrah (1938-2011) was an Ivorian ambassador and microbiologist.

== Early life and education ==
Berrah was born in Aïn Beïda, Algeria on May 29, 1938. After earning his baccalaureate, Berrah started attending his medical school in France. While there he was the co-founder of the Association of North African Muslim Students, an anti-colonial civil rights association, and joined the Algerian Revolution. He received a master's degree in 1961 and PhD in Microbiology from Indiana University, Bloomington in 1963.

== Career ==
As a physician, Berrah worked in Missour, Morocco for the Ministry of Health. As a researcher, Berrah worked on the process of inhibition in DNA synthesis at the Indiana University. In 1963, he became a professor at the Yale School of Medicine. In 1965, Berrah became an adviser to the Foreign Ministry of Côte d'Ivoire and a close counselor for President Félix Houphouët-Boigny. As a part of this work, he was part of the Ivory Coast delegation to United Nations General Assembly, the OAU, and was a special assistant to the president, and later Ambassador, until 1993. In this role, he worked to further the nation's foreign affairs policy, including diplomatic overtures to foreign leaders and working on Israeli-Palestinian relations. In 1966, Berrah was elected to the New York Academy of Sciences. Berrah died on March 4, 2011, in Miami, Florida.
