= J. Scott Long =

American sociologist and statistician

J. Scott Long is an American sociologist who is a distinguished professor of statistics and sociology at Indiana University Bloomington. Long completed his undergraduate degree at Juniata College in 1973. This was followed by graduate education at Cornell University, where Long finished both his masters in 1973 and Ph.D. in 1977. During his career, he has held appointments at Cornell University and Washington State University before coming to Indiana University in 1989. His career began by studying the dynamics of how doctoral graduates progress through scientific fields using data collected from biochemists. Following this, his research focused on the differences in career outcomes among male and female doctoral graduates, chairing a congressionally mandated committee of the National Academy of Sciences in the process. Long has published over seventy peer-reviewed works in the field.

== Awards ==
- Sociological Research Association, Elected 1989
- Edwin Sutherland Teaching Award, 1996
- Paul F. Lazarsfeld Memorial Award for Distinguished Contributions to Sociological Methodology, 2002
- Georgia Tech Center WST Distinguished Lecturer, 2007/2008
- Freidson Award from the Medical Sociology Section of the American Sociological Association, 2009
- Hurbert M. Blalock Lecture, Interuniversity Consortium of Political and Social Research, 2009
- Key Note Speaker, Valedictory Conference for Jacques Hagenaars, Tilburg University, 2010
- Ellis Lecture, Juniata College, 2010
- Fellow of the American Statistical Association, 2013
