= Vicky J. Meretsky =

American biologist

- Education: Cornell University
- Scientific career
- Fields: Conservation Biology, Ecology, Statistics
- Workplaces: Indiana University Bloomington

Vicky J. Meretsky is an American professor and Director of Environmental Masters Programs at Indiana University Bloomington.

== Education ==
Meretsky received a Bachelor of Sciences at Cornell University in 1980. In 1988, she completed her first Master's degree in Wildlife Ecology at Humboldt State University in Arcata, California and pursued a second Master's degree in Statistics from the University of Arizona in 1993. She completed her Doctorate in 1995 at the University of Arizona, where she studied the foraging ecology of Egyptian vultures in the Negev Desert.

== Career and research ==
Meretsky is currently a professor at Indiana University Bloomington (IUB), teaching: conservation biology, how climate change impacts on natural resources, and graduate statistics. She has held several adjunct positions in various departments since she became an affiliated faculty member in 1998. Previously, Meretsky taught as an adjunct professor at the University of Arizona from 1996 until 2001.

Outside academia, she has worked as a consultant and specialist for outside universities and governmental organizations, including wetlands consultancy for the Department of Justice. Before her employment at IU, she worked for the U.S. Fish and Wildlife Service as a research biologist studying endangered species and ecosystem management in the Grand Canyon.

Meretsky’s work focuses on both the science and policy aspects of conservationism, studying the effects of anthropogenic climate change on single species as well as broader impacts on ecosystems and whole regions. Her interests include, but are not limited to, "conservation planning, ecology of rare species, integrating ecosystem and endangered species management with adaptive management, and impacts of climate change on each." She sits on the advisory board of the Sycamore Land Trust in Indiana. She has spent time studying numerous species within and outside the US, including Egyptian vultures, the humpback chub, and the California condor and was involved in measuring the effects of the insecticide DDT on condor reproduction.

== Awards and honors ==
Meretsky is a five-time winner of the Trustees Teaching Award at IU, three-time winner of the Teaching Excellence Recognition Award, and three-time winner of IU's School of Public Environmental Affairs (SPEA) Outstanding Teaching Award. In addition, she has received several grants for her continued research, including two EPA-funded National Lakes Assessment grants as well as a $400,000 teaching grant from the Department of Education for the funding of a US-Russia Global Environmental Issues Research and Study Program.

== Publications ==
- Meretsky, Vicky J.; Snyder, Noel F. R.; Beissinger, Steven R.; Clendenen, David A.; Wiley, James W. (2000). "Demography of the California Condor: implications for reestablishment". Conservation Biology. 14 (4): 957–967. Bibcode:2000ConBi..14..957M. doi:10.1046/j.1523-1739.2000.99113.x. S2CID 44017372.<
- Stevens, Lawrence E.; Ayers, Tina J.; Bennett, Jeffery B.; Christensen, Kerry; Kearsley, Michael J. C.; Meretsky, Vicky J.; Phillips, Arthur M.; Parnell, Roderic A.; Spence, John; Sogge, Mark K.; Springer, Abraham E.; Wegner, David L. (2001). "Planned flooding and Colorado River riparian trade-offs downstream from Glen Canyon Dam, Arizona". Ecological Applications. 11 (3): 701–710. doi:10.1890/1051-0761(2001)011[0701:PFACRR]2.0.CO;2.
- Stevens, Lawrence E.; Meretsky, Vicky J., eds. (2008). Aridland springs in North America: ecology and conservation. University of Arizona Press. ISBN 9780816526451.
- Meretsky, Vicky J.; Wegner, D. L.; Stevens, L. E. (2000). "Balancing Endangered Species and Ecosystems: A Case Study of Adaptive Management in Grand Canyon". Environmental Management. 25 (6): 579–586. doi:10.1007/s002670010045. PMID 10790523.
- Zengel, Scott A.; Meretsky, Vicky J.; Glenn, Edward P.; Felger, Richard S.; Ortiz, David (1995). "Cienega de Santa Clara, a remnant wetland in the Rio Colorado delta (Mexico): vegetation distribution and the effects of water flow reduction". Ecological Engineering. 4 (1): 19–36. Bibcode:1995EcEng...4...19Z. doi:10.1016/0925-8574(94)00050-F.
- Reyes-García, Victoria; Fernández-Llamazares, Álvaro; Aumeeruddy-Thomas, Yildiz; Benyei, Petra; Bussmann, Rainer W.; Diamond, Sara K.; García-Del-Amo, David; Guadilla-Sáez, Sara; Hanazaki, Natalia; Kosoy, Nicolas; Lavides, Margarita; Luz, Ana C.; McElwee, Pamela; Meretsky, Vicky J.; Newberry, Teresa; Molnár, Zsolt; Ruiz-Mallén, Isabel; Salpeteur, Matthieu; Wyndham, Felice S.; Zorondo-Rodriguez, Francisco; Brondizio, Eduardo S. (2022). "Recognizing Indigenous peoples' and local communities' rights and agency in the post-2020 Biodiversity Agenda". Ambio. 51 (1): 84–92. Bibcode:2022Ambio..51...84R. doi:10.1007/s13280-021-01561-7. PMC 8651947. PMID 34008095.
- Collaborative Governance under the Endangered Species Act: an empirical analysis of protective regulations, (with R.L. Fischman, M. Castelli), Yale Journal of Regulation, 38:976-1058 (2021)
