= Jean Dufy =

French painter (1888–1964)

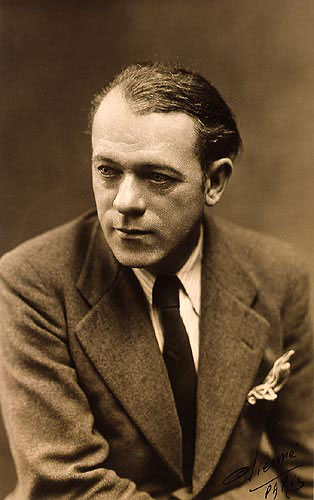
- Born: 12 March 1888; Le Havre, France
- Died: 12 May 1964 (aged 76); La Boissiere, Boussay, France
- Known for: Painting, drawing, design, printmaking
- Movement: Fauvism, impressionism, modernism, cubism

Jean Dufy (12 March 1888 – 12 May 1964) was a French painter of Parisian society, country scenes, circuses, horse races, theatrical productions, and orchestras. His work was exhibited in museums and galleries throughout his career.

== Early life and career ==
Dufy was born on 12 March 1888 into a large, middle-class family in Le Havre. Two older brothers became musicians; a third older brother was the artist Raoul Dufy. Dufy left the Collège Saint-Joseph at the age of sixteen and was then placed as a clerk in a commercial enterprise. In 1906 he visited an exhibition put on by the Cercle de l’Art Moderne in Le Havre and was particularly inspired by a painting by Henri Matisse, Fenêtre ouverte à Collioure. In 1907 he sold one of his first paintings to a founding member of the Cercle de l’Art Moderne. Between 1907 and 1909 he worked as a purser’s clerk on board the transatlantic liner La Savoie.

After completing his military service (1910-1912), Dufy moved to Paris, where he became acquainted with artists André Derain, Georges Braque, Pablo Picasso and the poet Guillaume Apollinaire. In 1914, Dufy's watercolours were exhibited at the Galerie Berthe Weill.

== World War I ==
Shortly after his first exhibition, Dufy was drafted into the army in World War I. He was an ambulance driver with 24e Régiment d’Infanterie and took part in the Battle of Charleroi on 21 August 1914, before becoming a cyclist in the artillery. In 1917 he joined the 103e Régiment d’Artillerie Lourde. He continued to sketch during his time in the army.

== Artistic career ==
In 1920, after spending some time in the Vosges to recover from an illness, Dufy returned to Paris and settled in the artists' quarter of Montmartre, next door to Braque. Between 1920 and 1932, his works were exhibited five times in the annual Salon d’Automne at the Grand Palais des Champs-Elysées. There were also exhibitions of his work in New York in 1930 and 1938. A number of themes emerged in Dufy's work. One was music; the canvas La Revue Nègre of 1925 was inspired by the cabaret show of the same name and was the first of a series of paintings uniting colours and music. The circus, and in particular clowns, was another theme, as well as Parisian street scenes.

In 1936, Dufy's brother Raoul Dufy was commissioned to create a huge mural celebrating electricity to cover a wall in the Palais de la Lumière et de l’Electricité for the 1937 International Exposition in Paris. At the request of his brother, Dufy worked on the project for a year, only to find that his contribution was not acknowledged by Raoul when the work, La Fée Electricité, was completed.

Dufy was a designer as well as a painter. Over a period of thirty years, he created designs for the porcelain of Theodore Haviland in Limoges. During those decades the artist developed flower and animal designs for the manufacturer and received the Gold Medal at L’exposition Internationale des Arts Décoratifs for designing the service "Châteaux de France".

== Later life ==
In 1922, Dufy had married Ismérie Louise Coutut, who came from Preuilly-sur-Claise in the Indre-et-Loire department in central France. In 1948 the couple bought a house in the hamlet of La Boissiere near the village of Boussay, Indre-et-Loire. Dufy continued to paint, while his wife looked after the local cats. Dufy died on 12 May 1964, two weeks after his wife.

== Public collections ==
- Albertina Museum, Vienna
- Art Institute of Chicago
- Harvard University Art Museum
- Indianapolis Museum of Art
- Indiana University Art Museum
- Musée National d'Art Moderne, Centre Pompidou in Paris
- Museum of Modern Art, New York
- Leventis Gallery, Nicosia
- Musée des Arts Décoratifs, Paris
- Museo Soumaya, Mexico City

== Exhibition history ==
- In 1929, Le Cirque is exhibited at the Grand Palais in Paris.
- Dufy exhibits in New York for the first time in 1930 at the Balzac Galleries.
- In December 1938, the Portland Art Museum organized an exhibition of modern paintings. Dufy was represented by La Chambre des Deputes, which was reproduced on the cover of the exhibition catalogue.
- Galerie Jos. Hessel in Paris exhibits 150 pieces by Dufy in 1948.
- In 1952, Dufy had a solo show at the James Vigeveno Gallery in Los Angeles.
- Van Dieman-Lilienfeld's (21 East 57th Street, New York, NY) held a show of Dufy's watercolors and oils in May 1955.
- In March 1964, Wally Findlay Galleries, Chicago, held an exhibition of roughly 20 paintings by Dufy.
- Wally Findlay Galleries, New York, held an exhibition in January 1975 that included oil paintings by Jean Dufy.
- Family Affairs, Brothers and Sisters in Art, held in 2005-2006 at the Haus der Kunst in Munich and the Palais des Beaux-Arts in Brussels.
- Raoul and Jean Dufy - Complicity and rupture, held at Musée Marmottan Monet in 2011 in Paris, France.
- Monet, Renoir... Chagall. Voyages en Méditerranée, held from May 26, 2020, to January 3, 2021, at L'Atelier des Lumières in Paris, France.
- La table, un art français du XVIIe siècle à nos jours, held from December 17, 2021, to March 6, 2022, at Hôtel Départemental des Expositions du Var in Draguignan, France.
- Monet, Renoir... Chagall. Voyages en Méditerranée, held from April 23, 2021, to September 12, 2022, at Bunker de Lumières in Seoul, South Korea.

== Gallery representation ==
- Galerie Jacques Bailly, Paris
- Galerie Barreiro, Paris
- Galerie Jos. Hessel, Paris
- Galerie Drouand-David, Paris
- James Vigeveno Galleries, Westwood Hills
- Findlay Galleries, New York and Palm Beach
- Hammer Galleries, New York
- Chase Galleries, New York
- Georges de Braux Gallery, Philadelphia
