= Kenneth Gros Louis =

2nd University Chancellor of Indiana University
- In office 2006–2017
- Preceded by: Herman B Wells
- Succeeded by: Michael McRobbie

Personal details
- Born: December 18, 1936 Nashua, New Hampshire
- Died: October 20, 2017 (aged 80) Bloomington, Indiana

Academic background
- Education: Columbia University(BA); University of Wisconsin–Madison (PhD)
- Thesis: The myth of orpheus and eurydice in english literature to 1900 (1964)
- Doctoral advisor: Helen C. White

Academic work
- Discipline: English and Comparative Literature
- Institutions: Indiana University

Kenneth R. R. Gros Louis (December 18, 1936 – October 20, 2017) was a university official and English professor at Indiana University Bloomington. Born in Nashua, New Hampshire, he attended Phillips Exeter Academy and Columbia University, graduating in 1959. In 1964 he was awarded a PhD in English and comparative literature at the University of Wisconsin–Madison. His research dealt with medieval and Renaissance literature. His teaching methods were brought together in Literary Interpretations of Biblical Narratives, which appeared in 21 editions published by Abingdon Press between 1974 and 1982.

He became an assistant professor in the departments of English and Comparative Literature in 1964 at Indiana University in Bloomington, Indiana. He taught courses on Shakespeare and medieval literature. He chaired the English department, 1973–1978, and served as Dean of the College of Arts and Sciences from 1978 to 1980. He was the campus executive officer as Vice President of the Bloomington campus from 1980 to 1988 and as Vice President of Indiana University and Chancellor of the Bloomington campus from 1988 to 2001. He retired in 2001. He returned as Interim Senior Vice President for Academic Affairs and Bloomington Chancellor from 2004 to 2006. He reported to system presidents John W. Ryan, Thomas Ehrlich, Myles Brand and Adam Herbert.

The university grew rapidly in enrollment, endowment, and reputation. Gros Louis set up the Office of Gay, Lesbian & Bisexual Student Support Services in 1994, and the departments of Film, Jewish Studies and Afro-American Studies. He expanded the department of journalism into the School of Journalism.

Academic offices
Vacant Title last held by Herman B Wells	2nd Chancellor of Indiana University; 2006–2017	Vacant Title next held by Michael McRobbie
