= Marion Gray Traver =

American artist

Marion Gray Traver (born 1892 - died 1979) was an American painter. She is known for her affiliation with the (originally named) National Association of Women Painters and Sculptors (herein "the Association") during the first half of the 20th Century, serving as an officer and winning multiple awards in its annual exhibitions. In April 1941, when the Association changed its name to the National Association of Women Artists, Traver was elected Recording Secretary, one of six officers.

From 1930 through 1940, Traver's paintings won the National Association Prize a total of five times in the Association's annual exhibitions. On September 28, 1939, at a special Fiftieth Anniversary Exhibition, First Lady Eleanor Roosevelt awarded the 1939 annual prize to Traver for the most popular work of art among the 300 artist entries.

== Exhibitions and press comments ==
Traver's first notable New York showing was titled “Monotypes in Color” from February 6 to 25, 1921, at the Schwartz Galleries, located at 14 East Forty-sixth Street. The New York Times review commented: “She favors increasingly winter subjects and her management of snow effects is remarkably good and well within the capabilities of the enticing medium". This early review highlighting snow landscapes was indicative of her emerging career, as many of her later oil paintings also featured snow.

In January 1928, Traver exhibited both monotypes and oil paintings at the original Art Centre in New York City at 65 East Fifty-sixth Street. The New York Times reviewed this exhibition twice. An initial review titled “Winter Paintings Shown” on January 17, 1928, noted “Most of the pictures are Winter scenes of Massachusetts and Vermont and depict the play of sunshine on snow.” The second New York Times review, published five days later on January 22, 1928, within "To Be Seen, Work of Variety and Interest in the Galleries", commented: “Marion Gray Traver, now exhibiting oils and monotypes at the Art Centre, is evidently an artist who prefers painting immediate outdoor impressions to the studio approach landscape. With the free use of the palate knife, Traver has succeeded in transmitting her impressions to canvas with great freedom and range of color. Minute variations in tonal gray are skillfully welded in “One Winter’s Day,” while other canvases are built on the delicate tints of Spring or on the rich harmonies of full Summer.” Traver's father and teacher, artist George A. Traver, died “at his residence” shortly after this exhibition, on or about March 4, 1928.

On April 20, 1930, The New York Times art reporter Ruth Green Harris featured Traver in her column "A REVIEWER’S NOTEBOOK", under the heading "Jean Dufy, Gallibert, Ben Shawn, Whorf, Nagel, Captain Vivian Guy, Other Artists". Harris reviewed Traver's exhibition at the Art Centre, writing: “According to your nature, you like better or not so well the less recondite poetry of Marion Gray Traver’s painting. Painting it most certainly is, in oil and color and a large form brush. In well woven composition she describes the pleasantest of familiar things: Moonlight on snow, an orchard in Winter, a road to the village and Main Street in New England.”

In 1938, at the Forty-seventh Annual Exhibition of the National Association of Women Painters and Sculptors, Traver won the National Association Prize (her third) for a winter landscape titled “Silent Sunlit Morning, Vermont”. This painting had previously won the Celine Baekeland Prize of $150.

On September 28, 1939, First Lady Eleanor Roosevelt awarded Traver the 1939 annual National Association prize (her fourth) for her oil painting of a winter landscape titled “Among the Pines”. This work was selected as the most popular among the more than 300 items on exhibition at the Association's Fiftieth Anniversary Exhibition.

From December 1940 through January 1941, Traver won the National Association Prize for the fifth time, by popular vote, at the Annual Exhibition of the National Association of Women Painters and Sculptors held at the American Fine Arts Galleries. Her winning painting was titled “Just at Twilight”.
