= Jacques-François Menou =

French Army officer and politician (1750–1810)

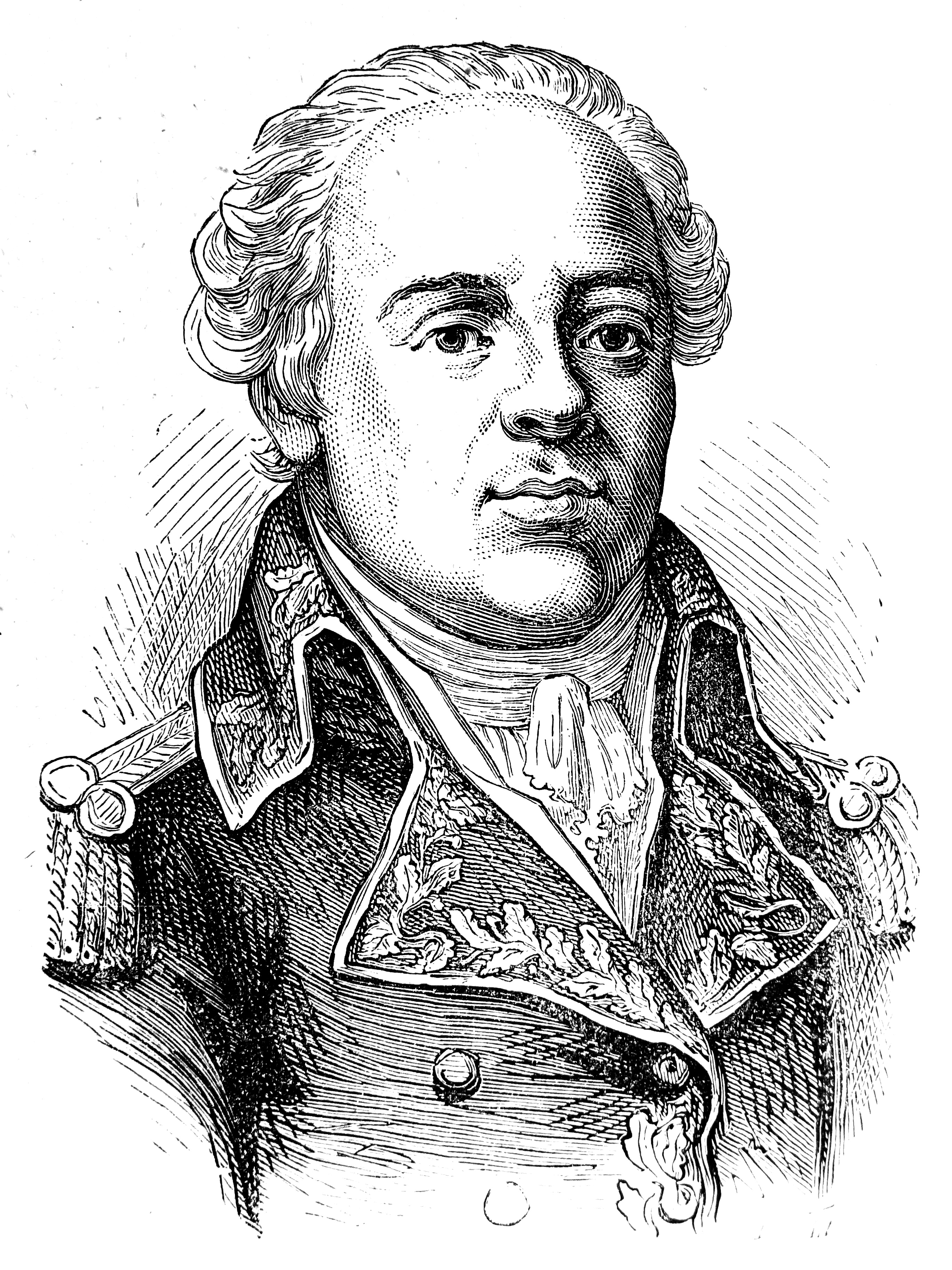
- 1889 portrait
- Born: 3 September 1750; Boussay, France
- Died: 13 August 1810 (aged 59); Venice, Italy

Jacques-François de Menou, Baron of Boussay (3 September 1750 – 13 August 1810) was a French Army officer and politician who served in the French Revolutionary and Napoleonic Wars. He is best known for his role in the unsuccessful French invasion of Egypt and Syria, where Menou converted to Islam and was renamed Abdallah de Menou.

== French Revolution ==
Born in Boussay, Indre-et-Loire to an aristocratic family, he had already attained the rank of maréchal de camp in the French Royal Army in 1789 when he was elected by the Second Estate of the bailiwick of Touraine to the Estates General of 1789. He was a liberal nobleman and supported the reforms of the National Constituent Assembly, of which he was elected secretary in December and president for a standard two weeks term (27 March - 12 April 1790). He served as a member of the diplomatic committee.

With the closing of the National Assembly in September 1791, he was employed as maréchal de camp in Paris, and then to the Army of the West of the French Revolutionary Army. He fought in the Vendée through 1793. Commander of one of the sections of Paris on 1 Prairial III (20 May 1795), he forced the rebellious Faubourg Saint-Antoine to capitulate. General in chief of the Army of the Interior, he was denounced as a traitor, put on trial and acquitted in 1795.

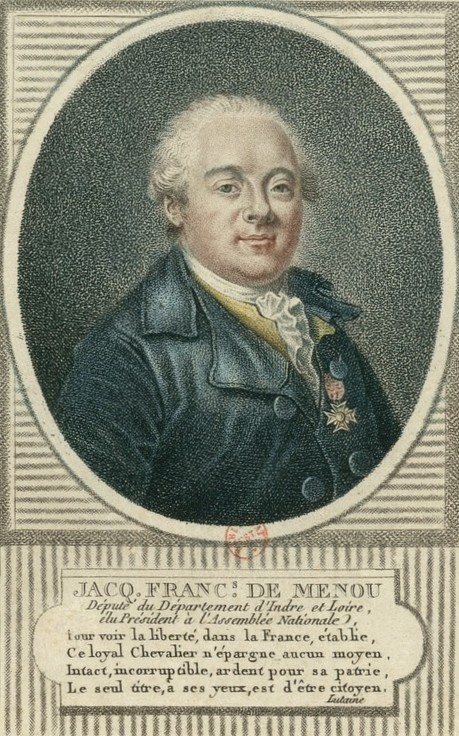
1790 portrait of Menou

== Campaign in Egypt ==
In 1798, Menou commanded one of the five divisions of the Armée d'Orient in Napoleon's campaign of Egypt. After the assassination of Jean-Baptiste Kléber (14 June 1800), Menou succeeded him at the head of Egypt as general in chief. He was not as popular as Kléber, and lacked support from the other officers. He married the daughter of a rich Egyptian, Zubaidah bint Muhammad El Bawwab, converted to Islam and was renamed Abdallah.

On 21 March 1801, Menou commanded the French expeditionary force sent to repel British forces landing at La Muiron. The French were defeated and Menou withdrew to Alexandria, where he surrendered to Anglo-Ottoman forces following the Siege of Alexandria on 30 August 1801.

Menou was permitted to evacuate the remaining French forces, but handed over the Rosetta Stone in exchange, the discovery of which had been reported to him by Captain Pierre-François Bouchard; it was a vital key to understanding the lost language of hieroglyphics.

== Statesman of the Empire ==
Menou was appointed as a member of the Tribunat on 27 Floreal X (17 May 1802). Shortly afterwards he became Administrator of the 27th Military Division (Piedmont). Subsequently, he was appointed a member of the Legion of Honor on 19 Frimaire XII (11 December 1803) and a Grand Officer of the Order 25 Prairial XII (14 June 1804). He was created comte de l'Empire in 1808.

Menou's principal contributions to the French Empire came in Italy. He was named Knight of the Order of the Iron Crown 23 December 1807, shortly after his appointment as Governor of Venice. While still holding this appointment, he died on 13 August 1810, at the Villa Corniani near Mestre.

The name of General Menou is inscribed on the Arc de Triomphe, on the south side. By his marriage to Zubaidah El Bawwab, he had a son Jacques Mourad Soliman (born 28 July 1800 in Rosetta, Egypt).

== Sources ==
- Louis Adolphe Thiers, History of the Consulate and the Empire of France under Napoleon, London 1893, v. 2, Book X, passim.
