= Huldah Cherry Jeffe =

American artist

Cherry Jeffe Huldah
- Born: Huldah Cherry; 1901; Dallas, Texas
- Died: 2001 (aged 99–100); New York, United States
- Resting place: Arlington National Cemetery
- Education: Art Students League of New York; Grand Central School of Art
- Style: Impressionism

Hurrah Cherry Jeffe (1901–2001) was an American artist and illustrator known for her impressionistic paintings of mainly female characters.

== Life and career ==
Huldah Cherry was born 1901 in Dallas, Texas. She began painting as a child. She studied at the Art Students League of New York and the Grand Central School of Art in New York City and became a student of Robert Brackman.

Jeffe moved to New York City, where she used ballerinas as models for her paintings; one dancer, Sally McRoberts, was her main model for several years. In later years, her niece, Guldah, was also an inspiration for her subjects.

Jeffe saw financial success with her art in the 1950s, and was well known for her Christmas card designs for Hallmark. By 1960, Jeffe lived in an apartment at the Hotel Pierre with her husband, General Ephraim F. Jeffe (d. 1986). At the time, her work sold anywhere from $250 “for a small still life” to $4,500.

Jeffe retired from art sometime in the 1960s or early 1970s, but returned by 1975, when she had her first one-woman exhibition in the Findlay Galleries in New York. That year, she was reported as living in Palm Beach.

Jeffe was buried beside her husband, Ephraim Jeffe, in Arlington National Cemetery.

== Work ==
Jeffe's paintings almost exclusively consist of stylized, French-inspired portraits of young women and girls. The paintings are characterized by their nostalgic "Belle Époque" soft impressionistic style and achieved significant commercial success through their reproduction on greeting cards and porcelain. Her style was inspired by French painer Pierre-Auguste Renoir. She also painted some landscapes and still lifes.

Jeffe often signed her work with “Huldah,” rather than her full name.
