= Legg House (Bloomington, Indiana) =

Historic house in Indiana, United States

- U.S. National Register of Historic Places
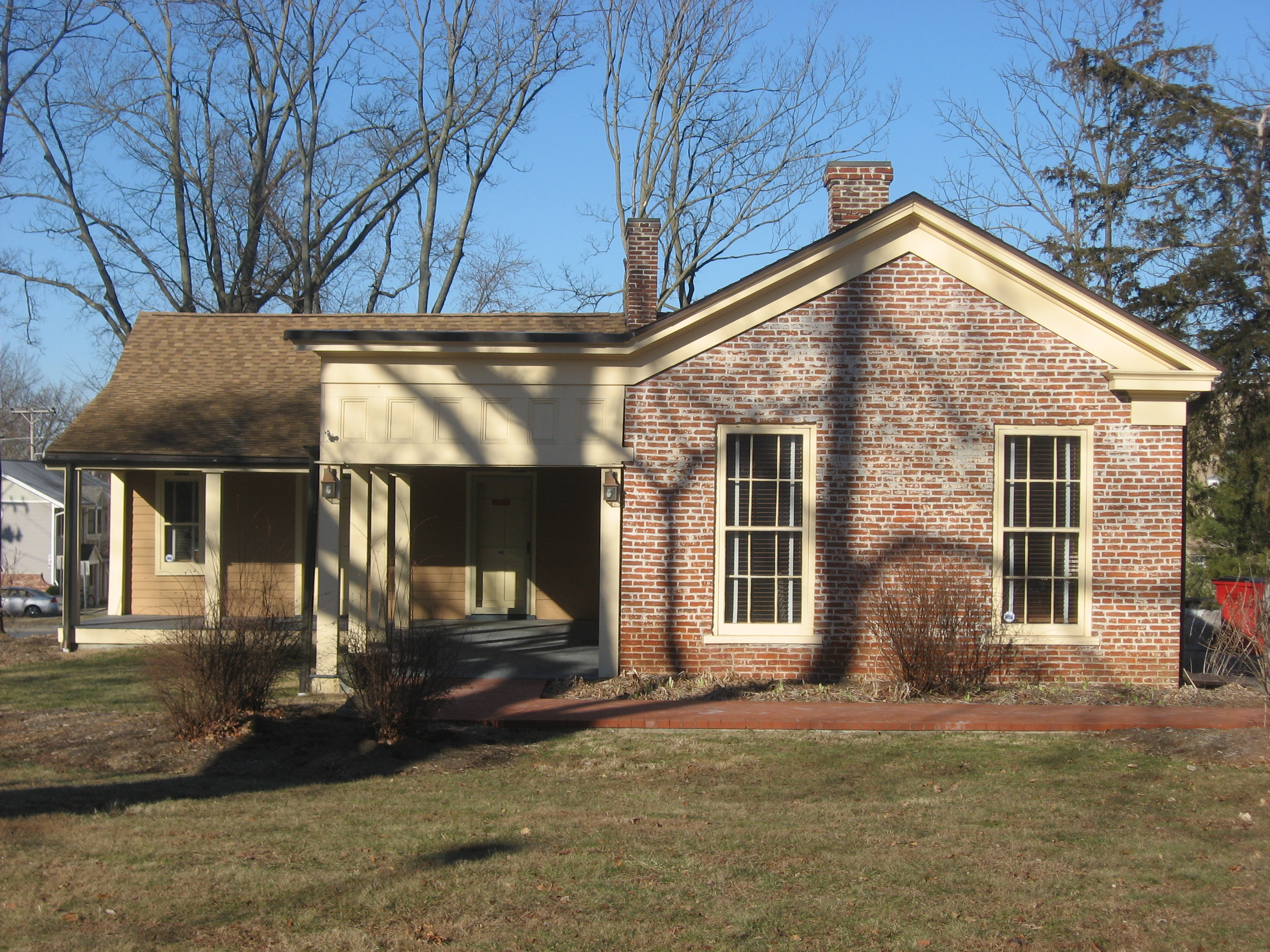
- Front of the house

- Location within Indiana Location within the United States
- Location: 324 S. Henderson, Bloomington, Indiana
- Coordinates: 39°9′49″N 86°31′39″W
- Area: 0.3 acres (0.12 ha)
- Built: 1848
- Architectural style: Greek Revival
- NRHP reference No.: 01000359
- Added to NRHP: April 12, 2001

The Legg House is a historic former farmhouse in Bloomington, Indiana, United States. Built in the middle of the nineteenth century, it has experienced a range of uses, culminating in its present status as an Indiana University office building. After a period of deterioration, it was restored to its original condition, and it has been designated a historic site.

== Construction ==
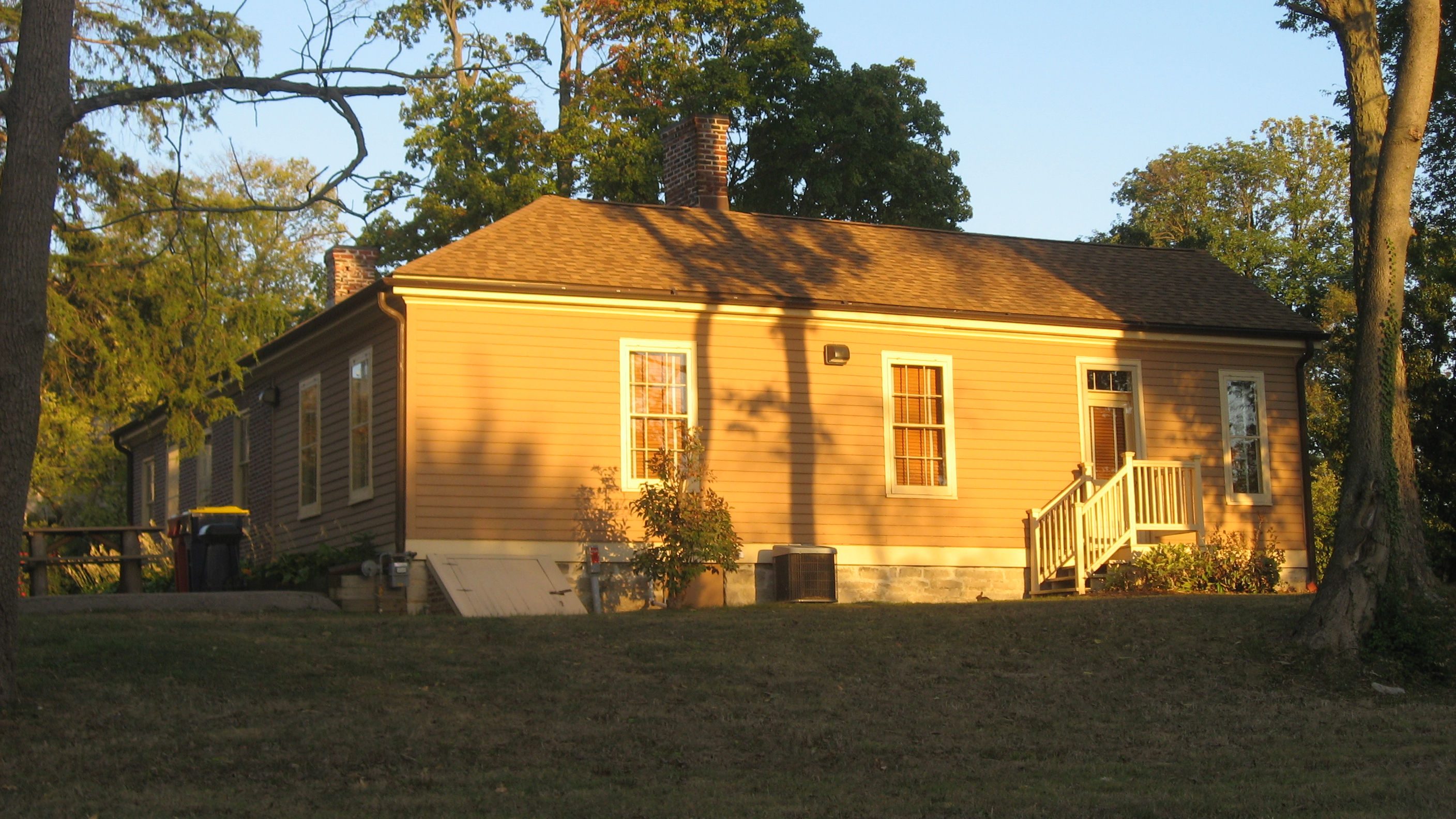
Western side of the house

A farm occupied the present site of the Legg House at least as far back as 1820. At that time, it lay on the edge of the city; the nearby Third Street was the only road that connected Bloomington to the outside world. Landowner George M. Legg built the original portion of the house in 1848, using a variant of the Greek Revival style of architecture. Its construction employed local materials: the walls are built of handmade bricks, laid on a foundation of locally mined limestone, and supported with poplar beams that were cut in the Bloomington vicinity. At the time of construction, it was a small house: just one story tall, it was divided into only two rooms. In later years, the house was modified significantly: a porch and frame wing were added during the 1870s, and elements throughout the house were covered during the twentieth century with elements such as drywall.

== Usage ==
By the early 1870s, the house had passed out of Legg's possession, being occupied by the parents and grandparents of William Lowe Bryan. At this time, it still lay at the city's edge, but the location became more central after 1883: in that year, a fire destroyed the buildings of Indiana University at Seminary Square, and the trustees chose to move the campus to the property immediately northeast of the Legg House. Within a few years of the university's move, the house was converted into a boarding house, a status that it held when visited by Bryan, by that point the president of the university, in 1890. This use continued into the late twentieth century; even after the university purchased the house in 1964, it was employed as student housing. Insufficient funding ensured that the house was not properly maintained; it was boarded up in 1993, and the university initially considered demolishing the structure before preservationists and city officials began to negotiate for its preservation.

== Restoration ==
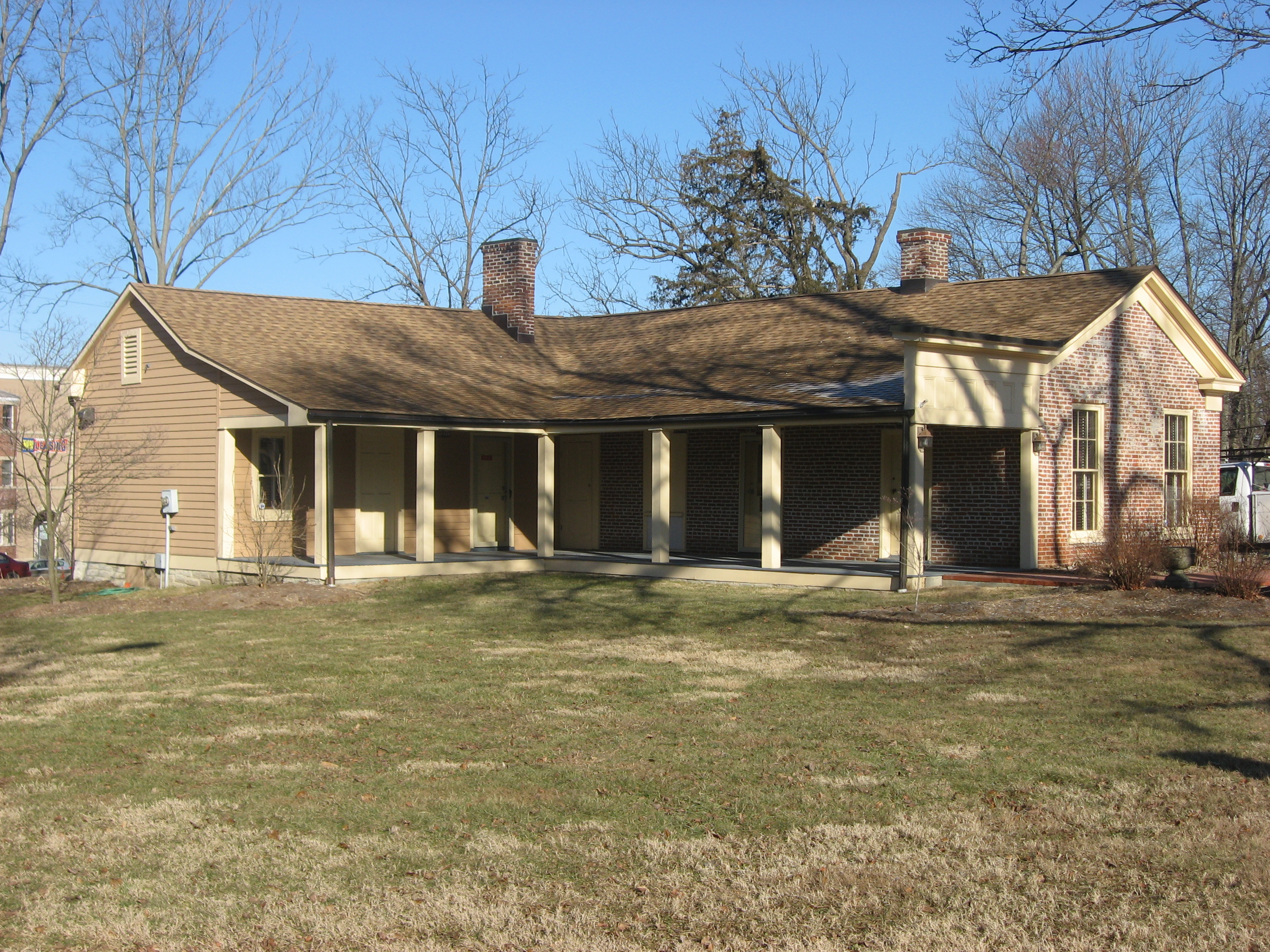
Porch view of the house

In April 2001, the Legg House was listed on the National Register of Historic Places, both because of its place in local history and because of its historically significant architecture. Later that year, as a result of this designation, the city and university were awarded a grant of $27,000 from the historic preservation division of the Indiana Department of Natural Resources, and renovation began in 2002. During its nine years of vacancy, the house deteriorated greatly; although the original woodwork of the interior was in satisfactory condition, the exterior had suffered such damage as broken windows, a collapsing porch, and rotting window sills. Among the elements restored by Greenfield company Advance Restoration were the foundation, the brick chimney, and the many wooden walls; workers removed both old paint applied by previous owners and significant amounts of graffiti applied by recent vandals. Today, the Legg House is actively used by Indiana University, serving as the location of the university's housing office.

== See also ==
- National Register of Historic Places listings in Monroe County, Indiana
