= Robert L. King =

American politician (born 1946)

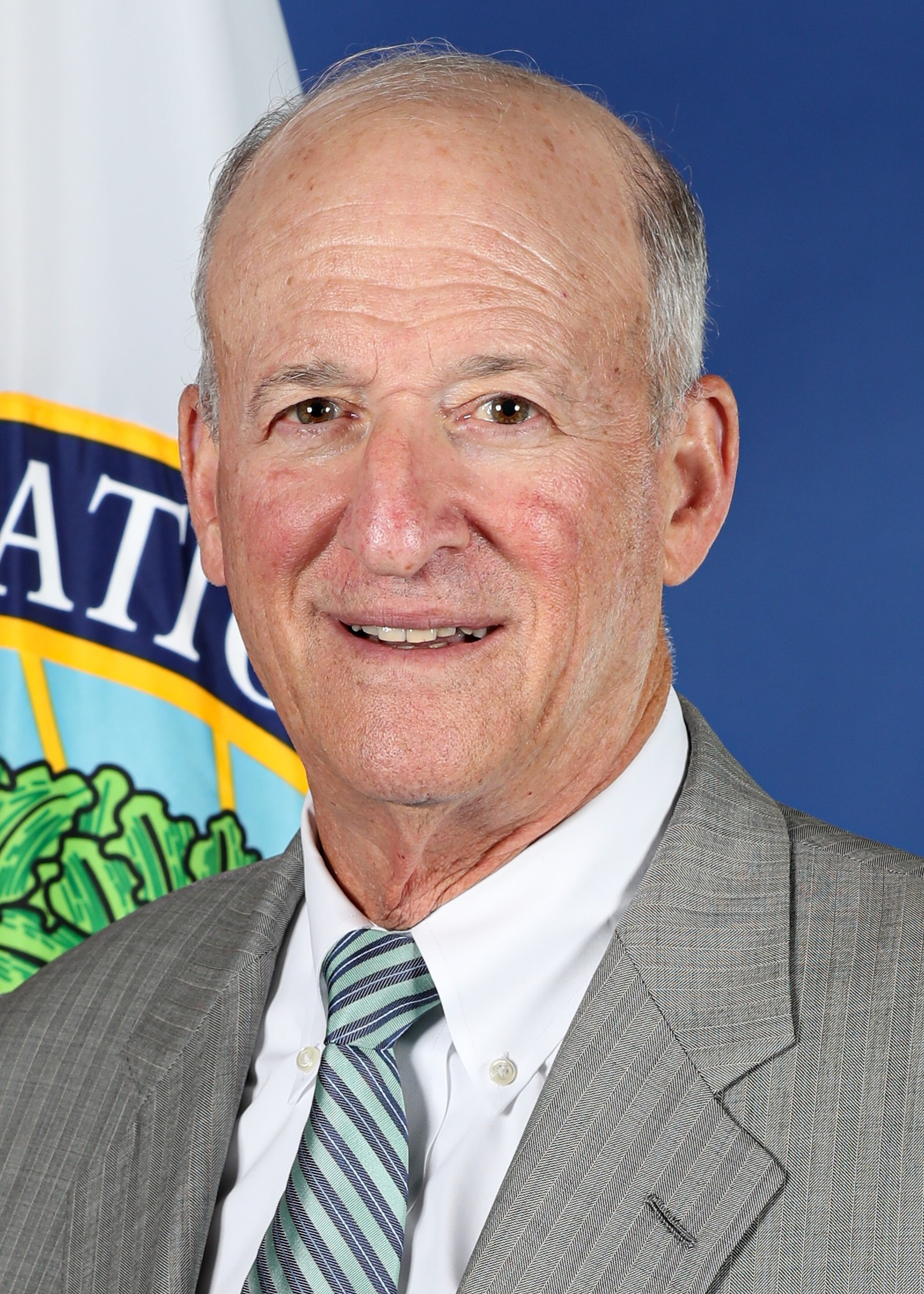

Assistant Secretary of Education for Postsecondary Education
- In office August 22, 2019 – January 20, 2021
- President: Donald Trump
- Succeeded by: Michelle Asha Cooper

Interim President of the State University of New York at Potsdam
- In office 2005–2006
- Preceded by: John A. Fallon
- Succeeded by: John F. Schwaller

6th Chancellor of the State University of New York
- In office 2000–2004
- Preceded by: John W. Ryan
- Succeeded by: John R. Ryan

County Executive of Monroe County
- In office 1991–1995
- Preceded by: Thomas R. Frey
- Succeeded by: John D. "Jack" Doyle

Member of the New York State Assembly from the 130th district
- In office 1987–1991
- Preceded by: Louise M. Slaughter
- Succeeded by: David Van Varick

Personal details
- Born: December 27, 1946 (age 79) Brighton, New York, U.S.
- Party: Republican

Robert L. King (born December 27, 1946) is an American higher education leader and former Assistant Secretary for Postsecondary Education at the U.S. Department of Education. He previously served as president of the Kentucky Council on Postsecondary Education. Other notable positions include having served Monroe County, New York Executive and as Chancellor of the State University of New York. On July 11, 2019, He was confirmed by the United States Senate as Assistant Secretary for Postsecondary Education.

== Early life and education ==
King was born and raised in Brighton, Monroe County, New York and graduated from Brighton High School. He graduated from Trinity College (Connecticut) and earned a Juris Doctor at the Vanderbilt University School of Law.

== Early career ==
He began his career as a Deputy District Attorney in California. He returned to Rochester where he served as an Assistant District Attorney, as well as a Special Assistant United States Attorney working for the Organized Crime Strike Force, and ran unsuccessfully for Monroe County District Attorney against Howard M. Relin in 1983.

== Politics ==
He was a member of the New York State Assembly from 1987 to 1991, sitting in the 187th, 188th and 189th New York State Legislatures. It was there that he met fellow Assemblyman George Pataki, who greatly influenced his later career. In 1991, he unseated Thomas Frey to become Monroe County Executive. In 1995, King resigned his office to join then-Governor Pataki as director of the State Office of Regulatory Reform. He cited his proposals to reform welfare, his introduction of Total Quality Management to county offices, the development of Frontier Field, education reforms, and collaboration with the city as his proudest achievements and his inability to achieve privatization of government services as his biggest disappointment.

== Education ==
In 1998, King became Pataki's budget director. In 1999, after a nearly year-long search, Pataki advanced King as a candidate to fill the shoes of John W. Ryan, the ailing Chancellor of the State University System, a move applauded by fiscal conservatives, but criticized by the SUNY rank and file. King had little experience in higher education and had authorized a SUNY budget freeze only two months prior. Additionally, Pataki had a longstanding desire to reduce the role of the state in the University's funding which already led to one Chancellor's departure. SUNY's board of trustees unanimously approved him and he took office on January 1, 2000.

During his time as Chancellor, funding for the University System began to shift from state taxpayers to private hands, which required campuses to seek revenue from tuition increases, from outside research grants and contracts, and from outside donations. King also sought to index tuition to inflation for the first time in the University System's history.

Also the system made significant gains in enrollment, average SAT scores, research and fundraising. Total headcount enrollment grew by 40,000 students from 2000 to 2004, and the number of minority students grew 20 percent. SAT scores of incoming freshmen improved at every campus, and the average SAT score for the system was 1150 in 2004, 100 points above the national public mean score. Research increased from $501 million in 1999 to $851 million in 2004.

After five years on the job, King sought a leave of absence, citing family issues, but the paid sabbatical raised the ire of the New York State Legislature. King publicly rescinded his request, and spent the next few months negotiating an agreement to move from his position into that of Interim President of State University of New York at Potsdam.

After retiring from SUNY, he joined the Arizona Community Foundation as its President and CEO.

At the end of 2008, King retired from the Arizona Community Foundation to take up the position of president of the Kentucky Council on Postsecondary Education in January 2009.

King served as the Council's third president, succeeding Gordon Davies and Thomas Layzell, until November 2018. As president, King led Kentucky's efforts to implement legislation regarding college readiness (KRS 164.302), college transfer (KRS 164.020) and training college board members (KRS 164.020). He also encouraged significant reform in teacher and principal training through the Kentucky Rising initiative.

During King's tenure as the state's higher education leader, Kentucky's public institutions saw steady growth in degrees and credentials, as well as student readiness rates. From 2009 to 2014, degrees and credentials grew 18.8 percent and transfers from the Kentucky Community and Technical College System to four-year colleges increased 31.4 percent. College readiness rates of all high school graduates increased 31 percentage points, of 32 to 63 percent. Readiness of Kentucky college entrants also experienced an increase of 18 percentage points, or 52 to 70 percent.

In addition, King moved to limit tuition increases at Kentucky's colleges and universities. Between 2009–10 and 2016–17, resident undergraduate tuition and fees represented a 60 percent reduction in the average rate of increase compared to the previous seven years. King also led efforts to move a portion of state funding for higher education to an outcomes-based model.

King is a member of numerous boards and organizations. He has served as vice chair and chair of the Executive Committee of the State Higher Education Executive Officers (SHEEO). Other notable board positions include the Board of Trustees of A.T. Still University and the National Center on Education and the Economy.

== Trump administration ==
On August 21, 2018, President Donald Trump announced his intent to nominate King to the position of Assistant Secretary for Postsecondary Education at the U.S. Department of Education. King's nomination was formally submitted on August 27, 2018. On July 11, 2019, the United States Senate confirmed his nomination by a vote of 56–37.

New York State Assembly
Preceded by Louise M. Slaughter	Member of the New York State Assembly from the 130th District; 1987–1991	Succeeded by David Van Varick
Political offices
Preceded by Thomas R. Frey	County Executive of Monroe County; 1992–1995	Succeeded by John D. "Jack" Doyle
Academic offices
Preceded by John W. Ryan	Chancellor of the State University of New York; 2000–2005	Succeeded by John R. Ryan
Preceded by John A. Fallon	President of the State University of New York at Potsdam; Interim; 2005–2006	Succeeded by John F. Schwaller
