= Herman B Wells =

President of Indiana University (1902–2000)

1st University Chancellor of Indiana University
- In office 1962–2000
- Succeeded by: Kenneth Gros Louis

Interim President of Indiana University
- In office 1968–1968
- Preceded by: Elvis Jacob Stahr Jr.
- Succeeded by: Joseph Sutton

11th President of Indiana University
- In office 1938–1962
- Preceded by: William Lowe Bryan
- Succeeded by: Elvis Jacob Stahr Jr.

Personal details
- Born: June 7, 1902 Jamestown, Indiana, U.S.
- Died: March 18, 2000 (aged 97) Bloomington, Indiana
- Resting place: Jamestown, Indiana
- Parent(s): Joseph Granville Wells; Anna Bernice (Harting) Wells
- Education: Indiana University Bloomington
- Occupation: Indiana University president, administrator, and faculty member
- Monuments: Herman B Wells Library
- Years active: 1930–2000
- Board member of: Indiana University Foundation; Federal Home Loan Bank of Indianapolis (1936–71); Lilly Endowment (1972–2000)

Academic work
- Discipline: Business administration
- Institutions: Indiana University

Herman B Wells (June 7, 1902 – March 18, 2000), a native of Boone County, Indiana, was the eleventh president of Indiana University Bloomington and its first university chancellor. He was pivotal in the transformation of Indiana University from a small, locally oriented college into a world-class institution of higher learning through expanded enrollment, recruitment of new faculty, construction of new buildings, new program offerings, and campus beautification projects. He remained steadfast in his support of IU's faculty and students, especially in the areas of academic freedom and civil rights.

Wells began his career in banking, but served the university in a variety of faculty and administrative capacities during his seventy-year career at Indiana University Bloomington: instructor and assistant professor, department of economics (1930–35; dean and professor of administration, school of business administration (1935–37); acting president (1937–38); and president (1938–62). He gave up control in 1962 to become university chancellor (1962–2000); interim president (1968); and chairman of the board of the Indiana University Foundation (1969–72), as well as other leadership roles at the Indiana University Foundation.

== Early life ==
Herman B Wells was born on June 7, 1902, in Jamestown, Boone County, Indiana. He was the only child of Joseph Granville Wells, a bank cashier and a former teacher and elementary school principal, and Anna Bernice (Harting) Wells, a former teacher. Herman was not given a middle name, only the letter "B" not followed by a period. (A family tradition on his mother's side had middle names beginning with that letter, but Wells' parents could not agree on a middle name for him.) Wells's father committed suicide in 1948; his mother died in 1973.

Wells grew up in Jamestown, attended a local Methodist church, and played alto horn in the Jamestown Boys' Band. In 1917, the family moved to Lebanon, Indiana, the seat of government for Boone County, when Joseph was appointed deputy county treasurer. After school and on Saturdays, Herman helped out at a local bank where his father worked.

== Education ==
Wells graduated from Lebanon High School in 1920 and was voted "Funniest" and "Best All-Around Boy" his senior year. Wells served as treasurer for the high school's yearbook and was involved in the school's newspaper, theater productions, and various fundraisers. After graduation Wells worked at a bank in nearby Whitestown, Indiana, to earn money for college. Although Wells's parents were supportive of his desire to continue his education, they had limited financial resources to pay for his college tuition and other expenses.

Wells initially enrolled at the University of Illinois at Urbana–Champaign in 1920, but transferred to Indiana University Bloomington, in 1921 at the beginning of his sophomore year. Although his father objected to the move because Illinois had a strong business school, Wells convinced his father that the transfer to IU would be a good idea, especially since he intended to work in Indiana after graduation and already had friends at IU. Wells also pointed out that the connections he developed at IU would be useful to his future career. In his autobiography, Being Lucky: Reminiscences and Reflections (1980), Wells described his early impressions of IU: "It was a simple place in those days, with not yet three thousand students, but it had great charm and appeal for me."

Wells was active in campus life as an undergraduate at Indiana University, he pledged Sigma Nu fraternity, lived in its chapter house at 322 East Kirkwood, and became involved in campus activities. Wells served as the fraternity chapter's treasurer and was elected as his fraternity chapter's president (eminent commander) in his senior year. He was also treasurer of IU's Union Board, a student organization established in 1909. In addition, Wells played in IU's band and frequently visited the Book Nook, a local hangout that he described as "a remarkably fertile cultural and political breeding place in the manner of the famous English coffee houses." Wells earned a Bachelor of Science degree in commerce (business) in 1924.

After college graduation Wells spent the next two years (1924–26) working as an assistant bank cashier at the First National Bank of Lebanon, Indiana, where his father worked as a cashier, and living at home with his parents, before continuing his education at IU Bloomington. Wells earned Master of Arts degree in economics from IU in 1927. His master's thesis, "Service Charges for Small or So-Called Country Banks," was published in The Hoosier Banker in 1927. Wells began doctoral studies in economics at the University of Wisconsin–Madison, but his schooling ended in 1928, when he took a job with the Indiana Bankers Association.

== Early career ==
In 1928 Wells left his graduate studies at Wisconsin to take a job as a field secretary for the Indiana Bankers Association, where he remained until 1931. As part of his work at the IBA, Wells travelled throughout Indiana visiting local banks, attending meetings, and working closely with bankers to conduct research on the history of Indiana's financial institutions, banking regulations, and the causes of bank failures. He also wrote a monthly column, "Hoosier Highways," for The Hoosier Banker, the IBA's journal.

In addition to working for the IBA, Wells became an instructor in IU's Department of Economics and Sociology in 1930. By 1931 Wells had become the director of research for the state government's Study Commission for Indiana Financial Institutions, in addition to his jobs at the IBA and IU. Wells was the main author of the commission's report that recommended far-reaching reforms to Indiana's financial regulations and policies, many of which were adopted by the Indiana General Assembly in 1933 had a major impact on the state's banking laws.

Wells established a home base at Woodburn House, a private residence he leased on North College Avenue in Bloomington, during the early years of his career. He also spent time in Indianapolis, frequently staying at the Claypool Hotel or the Indianapolis Athletic Club, and at Nashville in Brown County, Indiana.

In 1933 Wells took a two-year leave of absence from his appointment as an assistant professor at IU. Between 1933 and 1935, when he returned to IU, Wells worked three full-time jobs. He was secretary of the Indiana Commission for Financial Institutions, as well as a bank supervisor, Division of Banks and Trust Companies, and supervisor of the Division of Research and Statistics at the newly created Indiana Department of Financial Institutions, a state agency that originated in the study commission's recommendations.

== Academic career ==
A statue erected in honor of Wells and placed at Herman B Wells Plaza on the campus of Indiana University Bloomington

=== IU instructor and dean ===
Wells began his seventy-year career at IU in 1930, when he joined the economics faculty as an instructor at the Bloomington campus. This position led to an assistant professorship in economics at the university in 1933. Wells accepted the job, but took a two-year leave of absence to work for the Indiana Department of Financial Institutions before returning to Indiana University

In 1935 IU's president, William Lowe Bryan, appointed Wells as dean of the School of Business Administration, which later became the Indiana University Kelley School of Business. Wells, who was Bryan's protégée, would succeed him as the university's president in 1937, despite rumors that Indiana governor Paul McNutt, a former dean of the law school, was interested in the position.

=== Indiana University president ===
In 1937, two years after his selection as dean of IU's business school, Wells was offered the position of acting president following Bryan's unexpected resignation. Wells accepted on the condition that he not be considered for the permanent presidency of the university, because he did not feel he was adequately prepared to take on the president's responsibilities. Wells became interim president effective July 1, 1937. McNutt, who was rumored to be the front-runner for the permanent IU president's post, withdrew his name from consideration, and on March 22, 1938, the IU board of trustees unanimously elected Wells from its remaining slate of candidates as the university's eleventh president. Wells was inaugurated on December 1, 1938, as the youngest state university president in the nation. Wells held this post until his retirement in 1962.

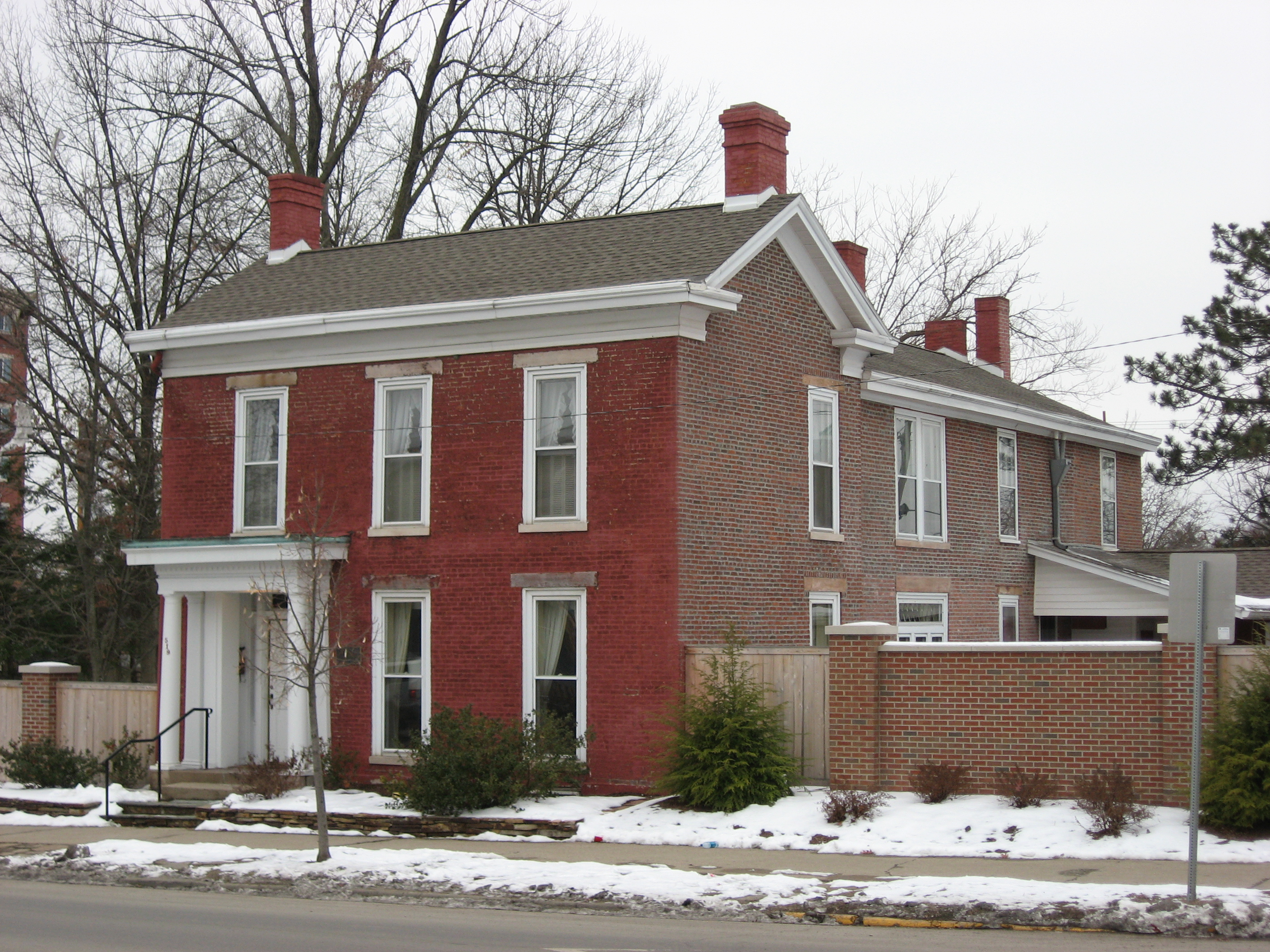
Woodburn House in Bloomington, where Wells lived early in his IU presidency.

Although Wells could have moved into in the President's House on campus, he remained at Woodburn House, his residence close to downtown Bloomington, for twenty-five years. Woodburn House allowed him more privacy, away from campus life. James Woodburn, the owner of Woodburn House, donated the residence to the university in 1940. Bryan, who became IU's president emeritus, continued to reside at the President's House on campus until his death in 1953. Wells lived in the President's House (later known as Bryan House) from 1957 until his retirement as IU's president in 1962. After Wells moved to the President's House, Woodburn House continued to be used as a private residence until the IU Alumni Association assumed management of the property in 1976 and converted it as a place to entertain guests.

Indiana University fared much better than most state schools thanks to the entrepreneurship dean and president Wells. He collaborated with Frederick L. Hovde, the president of IU's cross state rival, Purdue; together they approached the Indiana delegation to Congress, indicating their highest priorities. For Wells, it was to build a world-class music school, replacing dilapidated facilities. As a result of these efforts, the Works Progress Administration (WPA) built one of finest facilities in the country. He added matching funds from the state legislature, and opened a full-scale fund-raising campaign among alumni and the business community. In 1942, Wells reported that "The past five years have been the greatest single period of expansion in the physical plant of the University in its entire history. In this period 15 new buildings have been constructed."

During his twenty-five years as IU's president, Wells recruited new, research-oriented faculty members to the university. When Wells was serving as acting president he travelled in excess of 33,000 miles (53,000 km) in one year as he sought to attract bright, young scholars, as well as established faculty. Wells was successful at attracting notable research scientists such as behavioral scientist B. F. Skinner, geneticist Tracy Sonneborn, and Nobel Prize-winning geneticist Hermann J. Muller, among others. Another one of Wells's early efforts was to increase emphasis on the arts by adding more courses in music, fine arts, theater, and drama, and planning new cultural arts buildings on the Bloomington campus. Wells is also credited with bringing together students, faculty, staff, state government officials, and the public in an effort to develop IU as an institution of higher learning. In addition, Wells was pivotal in expanding the university's global perspective, which included expansion of IU's international study programs.

Following World War II, Wells oversaw the largest increase in the student population in the history of the university, nearly tripling the student body from 11,000 students statewide in 1938 to 31,000 in 1962. Wells became regularly involved in student activities, taking an active interest in the students' lives, and was popular among the student body. He frequently took walks around campus, where he often engaged in conversations with as many students as possible.

Wells also worked to end segregation at the university and to make his views known that racism would no longer be tolerated. For example, Wells ended segregated seating at IU Commons, the student dining facilities in the campus's Indiana Memorial Union building. He also worked with IU's black alumni and the university's college coach, Branch McCracken, to recruit Bill Garrett, the first African American to play as a regular player on IU's basketball team. (Garrett was also the first African American to regularly play on a Big Ten Conference basketball team.) In 1947, when the local barbers union refused to cut black students' hair in their off-campus shops during regular business hours, Wells leased the Indiana Memorial Union's barbershop to a barber who agreed to accept black and white students as patrons. Soon, the local barbers changed their position and cut black students's hair during regular business hours as well.

In addition to supporting IU students, Wells helped to advance academic freedom for IU faculty, especially when Alfred Kinsey, an IU professor during Wells's tenure at the university, came under heavy scrutiny and criticism for his studies in human sexuality in the late 1940s and early 1950s. As a strong advocate of intellectual freedom, Wells staunchly supported Kinsey's controversial sex research and withstood sharp criticism following the publication of Kinsey's landmark studies on sexual behavior. "I had early made up my mind that a university that bows to the wishes of a person, group, or segment of society is not free and that a state university in particular cannot expect to command the support of the public if it is the captive of any group," said Wells.

While Wells was serving as IU's president, the university landholdings increased tenfold through acquisition of real estate to reach 1,700 acres (690 hectares), its approximate, present-day size. In addition, numerous buildings were constructed on campus the Bloomington campus. Major projects included construction of the IU Auditorium, which opened on March 22, 1941, as the cornerstone of the university's Fine Arts Plaza. The plaza was later expanded to include the Lilly Library, dedicated in 1969, and the Showalter Fountain, designed by sculptor and IU faculty member Robert Laurent and dedicated on October 22, 1961. Wells also worked with state government officials to transfer ownership of Thomas Hart Benton's Indiana murals, which were initially created for and displayed at the Chicago Century of Progress International Exposition (World's Fair) in 1933. Ownership of the murals was formally transferred to IU in 1938. The murals were incorporated into the design of the new IU Auditorium and installed in time for the building's dedication in March 1941.

Despite rapid expansion and increasing demands for space and physical plant improvements, Wells remained a staunch proponent of the environment. He strongly advocated preserving trees and developed guidelines to establish a series of green spaces throughout the campus. Wells once said, "To cut a tree unnecessarily has long been an act of treason against our heritage and the loyalty, love, and effort of our predecessors who have preserved it for us." As a direct result of these efforts, the IU campus at Bloomington is often considered one of the top five most beautiful campuses in the nation.

During his tenure as university president, Wells read and personally signed each diploma the university issued, a total of 62,621 diplomas, frequently adding personal notes. As Wells explained during his final IU commencement address as its president in 1962:

"During the past 25 years I personally signed the diplomas of all graduates. Neither printing press nor mechanical device of any type has been used to multiply my signature. Each diploma has been read as well as signed, one at a time. This has given me a sense of direct identification with each graduate. Many of the names I have recognized, recalling pleasant contacts and mutual experiences during college days. In other cases the names have brought to mind fathers, mothers, or other relatives of my undergraduate era or earlier. But whether I recognized the name or not, in the act of signing I felt some individual participation in the joy and satisfaction of each graduate who had won his degree with conscientious work and application."

=== Indiana University chancellor ===
Following Wells' retirement as IU's president in 1962, at the age of sixty, the IU board of trustees created a new post of university chancellor especially for him. He accepted the appointment and held this honorary title until his death in 2000. His main roles in the post were special projects, fundraising, conferring with private donors, administrative duties, attending cultural and athletic events, and acting as senior adviser to the university. During his years as chancellor, Wells also wrote his autobiography, Being Lucky: Reminiscences and Reflections (1980).

Chancellor Wells continued to support the arts, including creation of IU's Musical Arts Center, a performance space that opened in 1972, and the installation of Peau Rouge Indiana, an Alexander Calder stabile (abstract sculpture) in front of the MAC. In addition, the I. M. Pei architectural firm designed the IU Art Museum, dedicated in 1982, to complete the structures on the campus's Fine Arts Plaza, whose development began during Wells's tenure as IU's president. For a brief period, from July to November 1968, Wells also served as IU's interim president following the resignation of Elvis Jacob Stahr Jr., Wells's successor to the university's presidency.

=== Indiana University Foundation leader ===
During his tenure as IU's president and university chancellor, Wells also had a leadership role at the IU Foundation, the fundraising division of the university. From 1937 to 1962 Wells held the dual offices of the foundation's chairman of the board and president. He continued as the foundation's president and vice chairman of the foundation's board while serving as the university chancellor.

== Public service ==
Aside from his activities at IU, Wells remained active in public service throughout his long career. In 1943–44 Wells worked for the U.S. State Department's Office of Foreign Economic Cooperation in Washington, D.C. In 1944–45 he served as chair of the American Council on Education, and in 1946 Wells spent three months in Greece observing its democratic elections. In 1947–48 Wells was a cultural advisor to the allied military government in Germany following World War II. He also assisted in establishing the Free University of Berlin. In 1957 Wells was a delegate to the Twelfth Session of the United Nations General Assembly. Wells served as chairman of the board of the Education and World Affairs organization from 1962 until 1970. He was also a consultant in higher education and traveled the world on behalf of IU's international education projects.

Wells was a member and often assumed a leadership role in several educational foundations, including the Carnegie Foundation, the American Council on Education (1944–45), and the National Commission on Humanities (1964–65), among others. He was a member of presidential committees on overseas voluntary activities and U.S.-Soviet trade relations, as well as serving on several boards of directors, such as the Federal Home Loan Bank of Indianapolis (1936–71) and the Lilly Endowment (1972–2000). A recipient of numerous honors and awards, including twenty-eight honorary degrees, Wells received many tributes to his long career. IU student scholarships and student recognition awards, as well as memorials on the IU Bloomington campus and the main campus library are named in his honor. Wells was also the subject of a PBS documentary film. His autobiography, Being Lucky: Reminiscences and Reflections, was published in 1980.

== Art collector ==
Wells began collecting antiques during his early years in Bloomington and continued to collect art and antiques throughout his life. Most of his collection was donated to various IU organizations on the Bloomington campus. In 2001 the IU Art Museum at Bloomington opened a temporary exhibition that featured some of Wells's collections. One of the German paintings in the exhibition, Flagellation of Christ (ca. 1480s), also known as Geisselung Cristi, was subsequently returned to the Jagdschloss Grunewald, a small museum in Berlin, Germany. The oil-on-oil painting is attributed to the fifteenth-century German master of the Saint Goar altar. Wells donated the work to the IU Art Museum in 1985. According to IU, Wells purchased the late fifteenth-century painting in good faith from a London art gallery in 1967 and was unaware of its provenance. In 2004 representatives from Stiftung Preussische Schlösser und Gärten Berlin-Brandenburg (Prussian Palaces and Gardens Foundation Berlin-Brandenburg) informed the IU Art Museum that Allied soldiers had seized the painting from the Jagdschloss Grunewald museum in Berlin during the summer of 1945, at the end of World War II. In 2006, following extensive research of the painting's provenance, the IU Art Museum agreed to return the painting to Berlin, stating it could not "ethically retain this painting, which was unlawfully removed from the Jagdschloss Grunewald in 1945, in our collection." The painting remained at the IU Art Museum until 2010, while the Jagdschloss Grunewald was undergoing renovations.

== Later years ==
Despite ill health, failing eyesight, and hearing loss as he approached his ninety-eighth birthday in 2000, Wells continued to maintain an office in Owen Hall on the IU Bloomington campus. Following his retirement as IU's president, Wells resided at a home across the street from IU's Main Library on East Tenth Street that he had purchased in 1962. Wells donated the home to the university with the condition that he be allowed to live there for the remainder of his life. In addition to maintaining his Tenth Street home in Bloomington, Wells purchased a condominium in Bloomington's Meadowood retirement community when he was in his eighties. Wells rarely stayed overnight at his Meadowood property, preferring instead to use it as a woodland retreat and guesthouse.

== Death and legacy ==
Wells died at home in Bloomington on March 18, 2000, three months prior to his ninety-eighth birthday. His funeral was held at the First United Methodist Church in Bloomington on March 22, 2000, sixty-two years after his selection as president of the university. "A Celebration of Life: Remembering Herman B Wells," his public memorial service, was held at the IU Auditorium on April 5, 2000. Wells's remains are interred at Jamestown, Indiana, where he had spent his boyhood.

Wells had no children and never married, but he maintained an extensive network of contacts among friends and professional colleagues, as well as IU students, alumni, and faculty members. His contributions to IU were forged through his nearly eighty-year association with the university, beginning as a student in 1921 and continuing after he joined the faculty in 1930. During his years as president (1937–62) and university chancellor (1962–2000), Wells brought IU "to the front ranks of American research universities" through expanded enrollment, recruitment of new faculty, construction of new buildings, new program offerings, campus beautification projects, and steadfast support of its faculty and students. Wells also helped transform IU into "a cosmopolitan center of learning with an international reputation" and strengthened IU's emphasis on research, cultivated the arts, expanded IU's international programs and supported academic freedom. As Wells reflected on his twenty-five years as IU's president, he remarked:

"With full knowledge of the trauma, travail, blood, sweat, and tears the office demands, I would eagerly undertake the chore again. For me no other career could have been so satisfying, I have been luck and happy in my life work."

Wells's bachelor status and support for Alfred Kinsey's research sparked speculation he was a homosexual, but biographer James Capshew concluded that there was no evidence for or against this claim, writing that "I haven’t found any evidence that Wells ever dated or had romantic or erotic relationships with women or men."

== Positions and appointments ==
Wells held numerous faculty and administrative positions at Indiana University Bloomington:

- Instructor, Department of Economics, 1930–33
- Assistant Professor, Department of Economics, 1933–35 (on leave)
- Dean, School of Business Administration, 1935–37
- Professor of Administration, School of Business Administration, 1935–72
- Acting President, 1937–38
- President, 1938–62
- University Chancellor, 1962–2000
- University Chancellor and Interim President, 1968
- Chairman of the Board, Indiana University Foundation, 1969–72
- President, IU Foundation, 1962–69
- Chairman of the executive committee, Indiana University Foundation, 1972–75
- Vice-chairman and chairman of the executive committee, IU Foundation, 1975–88
- Vice-chairman, Indiana University Foundation, 1988–95
- First vice-chairman, Indiana University Foundation, 1988–95
- Professor of Business Administration, 1972–2000

Appointments included:

- Carnegie Foundation for the Advancement of Teaching
- American Council on Education
- Association of Land Grant Colleges and Universities
- National Association of State Universities
- Economic analyst for the U.S. Department of State, Office of Foreign Economic Cooperation, in Washington, D.C., 1943–44
- Cultural affairs adviser to the U.S. Military Government in West Germany, 1947–48
- U.S. delegate to the 12th General Assembly of the United Nations, 1957
- Adviser to the Ministry of Pakistan, 1959
- Head of the U.S. delegation to Bangkok for the Southeast Asia Treaty Organization Preparatory Commission on University Problems, 1960
- Vice chairman, National Commission on Humanities, 1964–65
- Member, President's Committee on U.S.-Soviet Trade Relations, 1965
- Director, Indiana Judicial Study Commission 1965–68
- Member, President's Special Committee on Overseas Voluntary Activities, 1967
- Board of Directors, Federal Home Loan Bank of Indianapolis, 1936–71 (Chairman, 1940–71)
- Member of the Board of Directors, Lilly Endowment, 1972–2000

== Honors and awards ==
Wells received many honors and awards throughout his career, including the following:

- Named one of "America's Ten Outstanding Young Men of 1939" by the U.S. Junior Chamber of Commerce
- Gold Medal Award recipient, International Benjamin Franklin Society, 1959
- Received Commander's Cross of the Order of Merit of the Federal Republic of Germany in 1960
- Received National Association for the Advancement of Colored People's Brotherhood Award, 1961–62
- Thailand Government Award of Commander of the Most Exalted Order of the White Elephant in 1962
- Elected to the American Philosophical Society in 1964
- Caleb B. Smith Medal of Honor from the Grand Lodge of Indiana Free and Accepted Masons, 1967
- Thailand Knight Commander (Second Class) of the Most Noble Order of the Crown in 1968
- Elected to the American Academy of Arts and Sciences
- B'nai B'rith Great American Traditions Award recipient
- Received the first Excellence in Education Lifetime Achievement Award from the Sons of the American Revolution
- Lifetime Achievement Award of the Greater Bloomington Chamber of Commerce
- Six-time recipient of the Sagamore of the Wabash designation
- Named Indiana University's "Man of the Century"
- Named a "Hoosier Millennium Treasure" by Indiana Governor Frank O'Bannon in 1998
- Named an Indiana Living Legend by the Indiana Historical Society in 1999
- Kappa Kappa Psi, National Honorary Band Fraternity Distinguished Service to Music Medal for Alumni Achievement.
- Recipient of twenty-eight honorary degrees, including an honorary doctorate, summa cum laude, from IU, which was conferred on him in 1962 during his final commencement ceremony as IU's president. Wells received honorary degrees from Butler University (1939), Rose-Hulman Institute of Technology (1939), Wabash College (1942), University of Wisconsin, Madison (1946), Earlham College (1948), DePauw University (1952), Miami University (1959), Trine University (1959), University of Louisville (1961), Anderson University (1962), Ball State University (1962), Franklin College (1962), Indiana University (1962), Ohio State University (1963), Washington University in St. Louis (1963), St. Joseph's College (1964), University of California Riverside (1964), University of Notre Dame (1964), Drury College (1968), Srinakharinwirot University (1968), Cleveland State University (1969), Columbia University (1969), University of Illinois, Chicago (1973), Howard University (1976), University of South Carolina (1980), and Alcorn State University (1986).

== Tributes ==
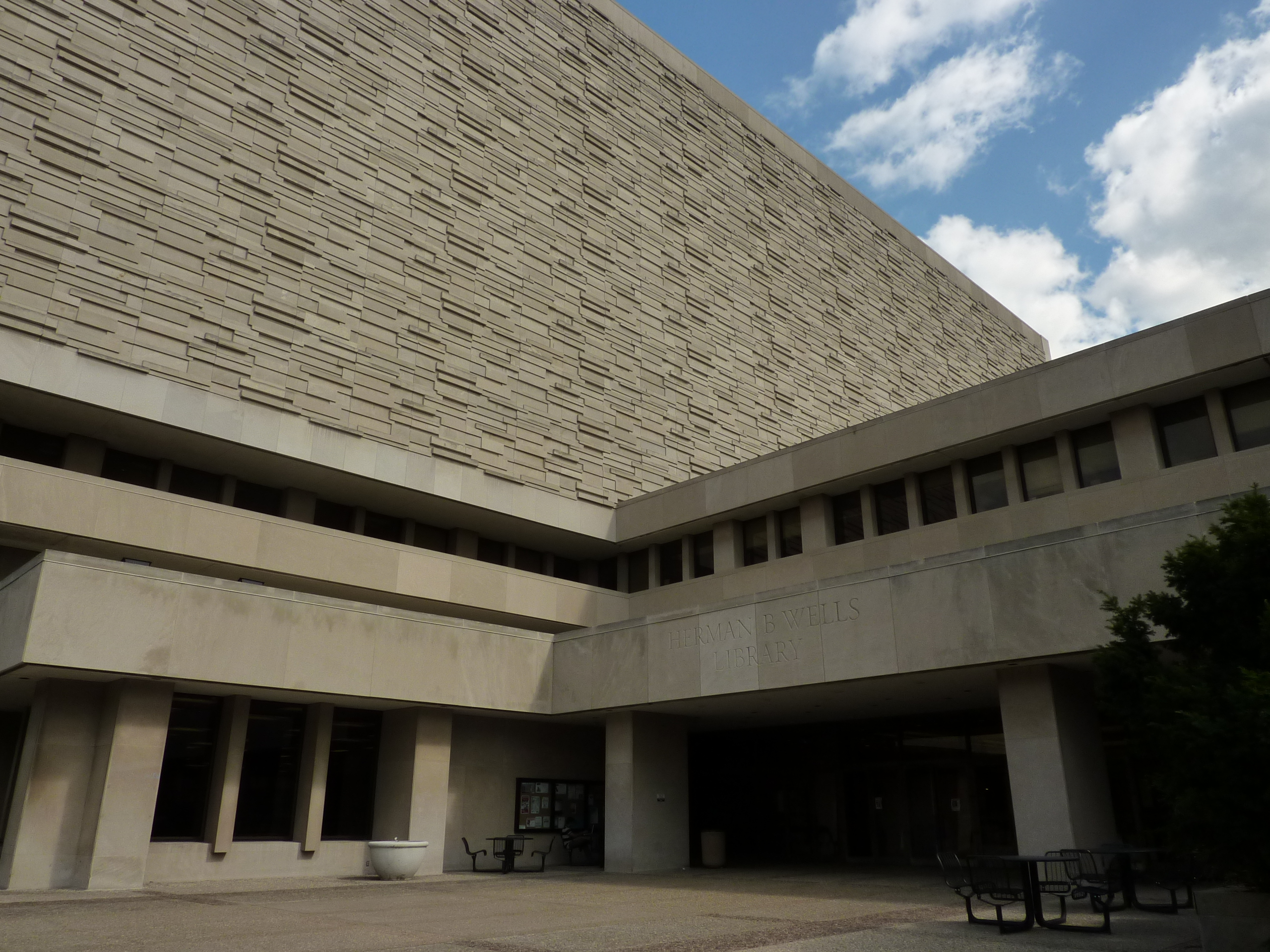
The main library of Indiana University Bloomington has been named after Herman B Wells since 2005

- Since 1962, The Herman B Wells Senior Recognition Award is given annually to an IU senior who exhibits a strong academic record, as well as leadership and service to the IU Bloomington campus.
- On June 15, 1973, the International Astronomical Union confirmed that minor planet 1721 (approximately 100 miles (160 km) in diameter) within the constellation of Leo was officially named "Wells."
- The Herman B Wells Scholar Program, which the IU Foundation established when Wells was in his eighties, provides four-year academic scholarships to a selective group of IU Bloomington students. The program's first group of scholarship recipients arrived on campus in 1990.
- In 1991, the Indiana University School of Medicine named their pediatric research center in honor of Wells.
- The Vision of Herman B Wells (1993), a PBS documentary of Well's life, was directed by Eugene "Gino" Brancolini.
- On October 21, 2000, a bronze statue of Wells by Tuck Langland, a professor of art at IU's South Bend campus, was unveiled in the historic, Old Crescent area of the Bloomington campus. The life-sized statue portrays Wells in middle age, seated on a park bench. Two additional benches, brick paving stones, and a low, limestone wall complete the memorial, which is known as the Wells Plaza.
- In 2001 the IU Art Museum at Bloomington opened a temporary exhibition, "Living with Art: The Legacy of Herman B Wells," which included selections of Wells's art and antiques collections.
- On June 17, 2005, IU dedicated its Main Library in Bloomington as the Herman B Wells Library. The university had to wait five years after Wells's death in order to name the library in his honor due to a university policy that Wells had put in place when he was chair of IU's naming committee. The policy required sufficient time to pass before naming a building in order to determine whether the name would endure or fall out of fashion. A bronze bust of Wells by sculptor Marc Mellon is installed in the library's lobby.
- Herman Wells is portrayed in the 2004 movie Kinsey.

== Published works ==
- Wells, Herman B (1980). Being Lucky: Reminiscences and Reflections. Indiana University Press. ISBN 978-0-253-11556-0.

== Notes ==
Academic offices
Preceded by William Lowe Bryan	11th President of Indiana University; 1938–1962	Succeeded by Elvis Jacob Stahr Jr.
Preceded by Elvis Jacob Stahr Jr.	President of Indiana University (interim); 1968	Succeeded by Joseph Sutton
New office	1st Chancellor of Indiana University; 1962–2000	Vacant Title next held by Kenneth Gros Louis
