= Elvis Jacob Stahr Jr. =

American governmental official

Elvis Stahr
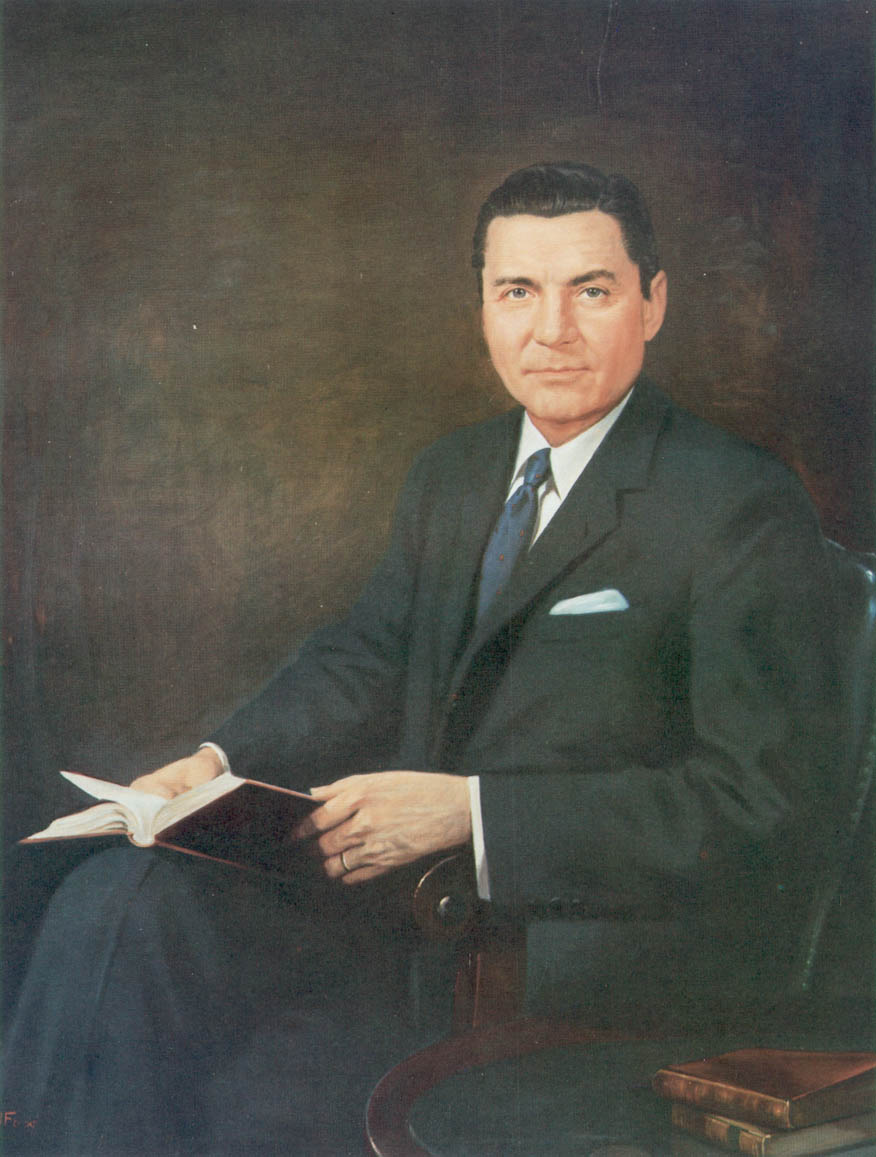
- Official portrait, c. 1962

12th President of the Indiana University
- In office 1962–1968
- Preceded by: Herman B Wells
- Succeeded by: Joseph Sutton

6th United States Secretary of the Army
- In office January 24, 1961 – June 30, 1962
- President: John F. Kennedy
- Preceded by: Wilber M. Brucker
- Succeeded by: Cyrus Vance

14th President of the West Virginia University
- In office 1959–1961
- Preceded by: Irvin Stewart
- Succeeded by: Paul A. Miller

Personal details
- Born: Elvis Jacob Stahr Jr. March 9, 1916 Hickman, Kentucky, U.S.
- Died: November 11, 1998 (aged 82) Greenwich, Connecticut, U.S.
- Resting place: Arlington National Cemetery
- Party: Democratic
- Spouse: Dorothy Berkfield
- Education: University of Kentucky (BA); Merton College, Oxford (BA, BCL)

Military service
- Branch/service: United States Army
- Years of service: World War II
- Rank: Lieutenant Colonel

Academic work
- Discipline: Law
- Institutions: University of Kentucky; University of Pittsburgh; West Virginia University; Indiana University

Elvis Jacob Stahr Jr. (March 9, 1916 – November 11, 1998) was an American government official, college president and administrator. After graduating from the University of Kentucky in 1936 as a member of Sigma Chi and Pershing Rifles, he attended Merton College at the University of Oxford on a Rhodes Scholarship. He served as lieutenant colonel in the U.S. Army during World War II. He returned to the University of Kentucky and became a professor and then dean of the College of Law, before becoming president of West Virginia University. He served as the United States Secretary of the Army between 1961 and 1962 and served as president of Indiana University from 1962 to 1968. He was the president of the National Audubon Society from 1968 until 1981.

== Early life ==
Stahr was born in 1916 in Hickman, Kentucky, to Hon. Elvis Stahr, a Fulton County, Kentucky judge and his wife Mary McDaniel Stahr. At age 16, he entered the University of Kentucky, where he achieved the highest academic average in the history of the university. He graduated Omicron Delta Kappa in 1936, and was a member of Sigma Chi and the National Society of Pershing Rifles, a Reserve Officer Training Corps fraternal organization. He attended Merton College, Oxford on a Rhodes Scholarship where he studied law. He was known at Oxford as "the Colonel" and resisted assuming British affectations. He practiced law in New York, then received a diploma in Chinese from Yale University. He served in combat units in China during World War II as a United States Army lieutenant colonel.

== Early career ==
Stahr practiced law in New York after the war, and in 1946 married Dorothy Howland Berkfield, a New York City debutante. In 1947 he became a law professor at the University of Kentucky. He was named dean of the University of Kentucky College of Law and served until 1956. With University President Herman Lee Donovan and Justice Thurgood Marshall, he helped desegregate the law school. During the Korean War, he took a 16-month leave of absence to serve as special assistant to Secretary of the Army Frank Pace Jr. In 1956, Stahr was staff director of President Dwight D. Eisenhower's Commission on Education Beyond High School. He was vice chancellor at the University of Pittsburgh in 1957 and 1958, and then was president of West Virginia University until nominated as Secretary of the Army by President John F. Kennedy in 1961.

== Secretary of the Army and President of Indiana University ==
Stahr served as Secretary of the Army in 1961 and 1962, during the Berlin crisis and the Central Intelligence Agency-sponsored Bay of Pigs invasion, aimed at ousting Fidel Castro from power. A major reorganization plan was launched; combat division structure was reorganized, special warfare forces community relations (Civic Action) were expanded, and the Army was strengthened during the Berlin Crisis. Stahr also mobilized the Alabama National Guard in 1961, when the Kennedy Administration undertook desegregating of the University of Alabama. In 1962 Stahr resigned to become President of Indiana University. He was the university's twelfth president. The Gary and Calumet campuses were combined to form IU Northwest, the joint IU-Purdue University campus was established in Fort Wayne, the School of Library and Information Science was founded, and the Herron School of Art in Indianapolis was affiliated with Indiana University.

== Later career and life ==
Stahr retired from Indiana University in 1968, accepting the presidency of the National Audubon Society. Under Stahr's leadership, the Audubon Society undertook a campaign to increase its influence and membership, which in 10 years more than quadrupled to almost 400,000. As president of the Audubon Society, Stahr led efforts to preserve the Florida Everglades from commercial and industrial development, fought for accords on international whaling practices and campaigned successfully to liberalize U.S. tax laws to allow charitable organizations to lobby on public policy issues. He retired from Audubon in 1981. In the years following, he practiced law in Washington, D.C., and New York, lobbying for environmental issues. He had served on several corporate boards of directors, including Chase Manhattan Corp. and Acadia Mutual Life Insurance Co. In his life he earned more than 27 honorary degrees from various colleges and universities. He was also awarded Omicron Delta Kappa's highest honor in 1984, the Laurel Crowned Circle Award. He died of cancer in his Greenwich, Connecticut, home on Veterans Day, November 11, 1998. Stahr and his wife Dorothy (1918–2005) are buried at Arlington National Cemetery.

== See also ==
- List of presidents of West Virginia University

Government offices
Preceded by Wilber M. Brucker	United States Secretary of the Army; January 1961 – June 1962	Succeeded by Cyrus Roberts Vance
Academic offices
Preceded by Irvin Stewart	President of West Virginia University; 1959–1961	Succeeded by Paul A. Miller
Preceded by Herman B Wells	President of Indiana University; 1962–1968	Succeeded by Joseph Lee Sutton
