= Joseph Sutton (college president) =

American academic (1924–1972)

13th President of Indiana University
- In office 1968–1971
- Preceded by: Elvis Jacob Stahr, Jr.
- Succeeded by: John W. Ryan

Personal details
- Born: Joseph Lee Sutton; March 22, 1924 Oklahoma City, Oklahoma
- Died: April 29, 1972 (aged 48) Bloomington, Indiana

Academic background
- Education: Oklahoma State University; University of Michigan
- Thesis: A political biography of Inukai Tsuyoshi (1954)
- Doctoral advisor: Robert E. Ward

Academic work
- Discipline: Political science
- Institutions: Case Western Reserve University; Indiana University

Joseph Lee Sutton (March 22, 1924 – April 29, 1972) was an American academic who served as the thirteenth president of Indiana University.

== Early life and education ==
Sutton was born in Oklahoma City, Oklahoma, to Erville C. Sutton and Carolyn E. (Hatch) Sutton. After graduating from high school, he attended Oklahoma State University for one year before enlisting in the army in 1943. He was discovered to have an aptitude for languages, which led the army to enroll him in Japanese language courses at the University of Michigan. Upon completion of the program, he was commissioned a Lieutenant and sent to Tokyo to serve as a Japanese language officer in General Douglas MacArthur's headquarters.

Sutton continued his education at the University of Michigan after being discharged from the army. He received an A.B. in Oriental Languages in 1948, an A.M. in Oriental Civilization in 1949, and a Ph.D. in Political Science in 1954.

== Professional background ==
- U.S. Army intelligence officer (1944–1946)
- Social Science Research Council Fellow (1951–1952)
- Lecturer at Case Western Reserve University (1952–1953)
- Professor of Government at Indiana University (1953–1972)
- Dean of IU's College of Arts and Sciences (1965–1966)
- Vice President and Dean of the Faculties at IU (1966–1968)
- President of IU (1968–1971)

== Tenure at Indiana University ==
Joseph Lee Sutton was an academic presence on the Indiana University Bloomington campus for 13 years before taking over as President from Interim President and Chancellor Herman B Wells in 1968. During his years as professor he was considered to be an excellent educator and in 1955 he received Sigma Delta Chi's "Brown Derby" award, which was granted to the most popular professor. As President, he was respected by administrators and faculty at IU.

Sutton's brief tenure as President saw many challenges, including widespread protests on campus about U.S. involvement in the Vietnam War. He oversaw the dedication of a new IU library in 1969, the same year that an act of arson was committed at the old library that cost an estimated $650,000 in damages. The culprit was never found. Sutton resigned his position as President in the fall of 1970 and was replaced by then Vice President John W. Ryan. He continued to work as a professor of political science at IU until his death.

== Personal life ==
Sutton married Jean Harkness on August 19, 1945, and together they had four children: James Werner, Geoffrey Joseph, David Harkness, and Abigail Jean. His wife Jean's death in 1970 prompted Sutton to resign as President of IU in order to spend more time with his children. He married Elizabeth Josephson in March 1971. Just prior to the couple's departure to Japan, where Sutton was slated to become an exchange Professor at Tenri University, they were involved in a car accident. He died on April 29, 1972, at the age of 48, as a result of injuries sustained from the accident.

Academic offices
Preceded by Elvis Jacob Stahr, Jr.	President of Indiana University; 1968–1971	Succeeded by John W. Ryan
