= John W. Ryan =

American academic administrator (1929–2011)

John Ryan

5th Chancellor of the State University of New York
- In office 1996–1999
- Preceded by: Thomas A. Bartlett
- Succeeded by: Robert L. King

Interim President of the University of Maryland at Baltimore
- In office 1994–1994
- Preceded by: Errol L. Reese
- Succeeded by: David J. Ramsay

Interim President of Florida Atlantic University
- In office 1989–1989
- Preceded by: Helen Popovich
- Succeeded by: Anthony J. Catanese

14th President of Indiana University
- In office 1971–1987
- Preceded by: Joseph Sutton
- Succeeded by: Thomas Ehrlich

1st Chancellor of the University of Massachusetts Boston
- In office 1965–1968
- Succeeded by: Francis L. Broderick

Personal details
- Born: August 12, 1929 Chicago, Illinois
- Died: August 6, 2011 (aged 81) Bloomington, Indiana
- Education: University of Utah (B.A.); Indiana University (M.A); Indiana University (Ph.D.)
- Profession: Academic Administrator
- Website: www.iu.edu/ryan/

Academic background
- Thesis: Bangkok government and administration: Appearance and reality (1959)
- Doctoral advisor: Edwin B. McPheron

Academic work
- Discipline: Political science
- Institutions: University of Wisconsin–Madison; University of Massachusetts Amherst; Arizona State University; University of Massachusetts Boston; Indiana University

John William Ryan (August 12, 1929 – August 6, 2011) was an American academic administrator who most notably served as the president of Indiana University for sixteen years.

== Early life and career ==
Ryan was born in Chicago, Illinois and earned a B.A. from the University of Utah in 1951, where he was a 1950 initiate of Kappa Sigma fraternity. He earned master's and Ph.D. degrees from Indiana University in 1958 and 1959, respectively. While in graduate school, Ryan served in two professional roles: first as a research analyst in the Kentucky Department of Revenue, then in establishing the graduate public administration program at Thammasat University. After graduating, he taught political science at the University of Wisconsin–Madison. In 1962, he became executive assistant to the president of the University of Massachusetts Amherst before moving to Arizona State University at Tempe to assume the vice presidency for academic affairs. He returned East to serve as the first chancellor of the University of Massachusetts Boston from 1965 to 1968.

== Indiana University ==
In July 1968, Ryan returned to Indiana University to become vice president for regional campuses and became its fourteenth president on January 26, 1971. His 16 years of service to the university saw the establishment of two new IU campuses in New Albany (Indiana University Southeast) and in Richmond (Indiana University East), the formation of various cultural centers on the Bloomington campus, and the creation of the School of Journalism, the School of Continuing Studies, the School of Optometry, and the School of Public and Environmental Affairs. Ryan served as chairman of the NCAA Presidents Commission in the mid-1980s during the battle for control of college sports.

Ryan retired in 1987 and was immediately appointed president emeritus of Indiana University. He remained an active figure within the university, both as a professor in the School of Public and Environmental Affairs and as a member of several boards and committees.

In one of his first official acts, Ryan hired legendary men's basketball coach Bob Knight on behalf of the IU board of trustees in 1971.

In the 1979 film Breaking Away, he played himself as president of the university, lecturing students on their behavior at the dining hall where they fought the Cutters (a reference to stonecutters who worked in the limestone quarries in southern Indiana).

On September 4, 2009, John Ryan was awarded the University Medal, IU's highest nonacademic award. According to an IU press release, "The University Medal honors individuals for singular or noteworthy contributions, including service to the university and achievement in arts, letters, science and law. It is the only medal that requires approval by the IU Board of Trustees. The presentation was a particularly special occasion, because it was Ryan who, as president, created the University Medal in 1982, bestowing it first on Thomas T. Solley, director of the IU Art Museum. Ryan is only the tenth person to receive the medal."

== The State University of New York ==
After retiring from Indiana University, Ryan took on temporary administrative roles, acting as interim president at the University of Maryland at Baltimore and at Florida Atlantic University, and advising the Papua New Guinea Commission for Higher Education.

In 1996, Ryan stepped in to fill the chancellorship of the State University of New York after his predecessor abruptly resigned. He was asked to assume the full chancellorship in 1997 and stepped down at the end of 1999.

Academic offices
New title	Chancellor of the University of Massachusetts Boston; 1965–1968	Succeeded by Francis L. Broderick
Preceded by Joseph Sutton	President of Indiana University; January 26, 1971 – August 31, 1987	Succeeded by Thomas Ehrlich
Preceded by Helen Popovich	Interim President of Florida Atlantic University; 1989	Succeeded by Anthony J. Catanese
Preceded by Errol L. Reese	Interim President of the University of Maryland at Baltimore; 1994	Succeeded by David J. Ramsay
Preceded by Thomas A. Bartlett	Chancellor of the State University of New York; July 1, 1996 – April 20, 1997 (Interim); April 21, 1997 – December 31, 1999	Succeeded by Robert L. King
