= Thomas Ehrlich =

American legal scholar (born 1934)

15th President of Indiana University
- In office 1987–1994
- Preceded by: John W. Ryan
- Succeeded by: Myles Brand

26th Provost of the University of Pennsylvania
- In office 1981–1987
- Preceded by: Louis Girafalco
- Succeeded by: Michael Aiken

7th Dean of Stanford Law School
- In office 1971–1976
- Preceded by: Bayless Manning
- Succeeded by: Charles Meyers

Personal details
- Born: March 4, 1934 (age 92) Cambridge, Massachusetts, U.S.
- Education: Harvard University (AB, LLB)
- Profession: Educator, lawyer

Thomas Ehrlich (born March 4, 1934) is an American legal scholar. From 2000 to 2010 he was a Senior Scholar at the Carnegie Foundation for the Advancement of Teaching. He has previously served as president of Indiana University, provost of the University of Pennsylvania, and Dean of Stanford Law School. He was also the first president of the Legal Services Corporation in Washington, D.C., and the first director of the International Development Cooperation Agency, reporting to President Carter.

After his tenure at Indiana University, he was a Distinguished University Scholar at California State University and taught regularly at San Francisco State University. He is author, co-author, or editor of 14 books. He has been a trustee of Bennett College, Mills College, and the University of Pennsylvania.

== Early life and education ==
Ehrlich was born on March 4, 1934, in Cambridge, Massachusetts. He went to Phillips Exeter Academy for high school. He graduated magna cum laude from Harvard College in 1956 and magna cum laude from Harvard Law School in 1959. While at Harvard, he was elected to Phi Beta Kappa and served as Article Editor for the Harvard Law Review. He was a law clerk to Judge Learned Hand of the U.S. Court of Appeals for the Second Circuit.

== President of Indiana University ==
Ehrlich became the fifteenth president of Indiana University on August 1, 1987, and retired from the position on July 31, 1994. While at IU, Ehrlich served as chair of the Midwest Universities Consortium for International Activities. During his time at IU, Ehrlich helped to increased overall retention rates, especially among minority students. The student population also grew, with 96,000 students attending one of the eight IU campuses as of 1994. Ehrlich was known for wearing a bowtie (usually red).

In 2000, Indiana University established the local Thomas Ehrlich Service Learning Award and the national Thomas Ehrlich Civically Engaged Faculty Award, an annual award given to faculty members who display outstanding achievements in the field of community service. IU President Myles Brand said that, "Tom Ehrlich's leadership raised the level of visibility and enhanced the success of service learning programs on all our campuses. This award will honor his legacy and recognize faculty who continue to show leadership in this area.

Ehrlich was succeed as IU president by Myles Brand, who served from 1994 to 2000.

== Honors and awards ==
Erhlich was appointed by President Bill Clinton as a member of the Board of Directors of the Corporation for National and Community Service, serving from 1994 to 1997 and 1998 to 2002.

Ehrlich has received five honorary degrees. He is a member of the American Academy of Arts and Sciences.

== Personal life ==
He has been married to Ellen R. Ehrlich since 1957. They have three children David, Elizabeth, and Paul, and nine grandchildren. They live in Palo Alto, California.

== Publications ==
Ehrlich has served as author, co-author, or editor of fourteen books during his academic career.

- The Courage to Inquire: Ideals and Realities in Higher Education (1995) with Juliet Frey
- Reconnecting Education and Foundations: Turning Good Intentions into Educational Capital (2007) with Ray Bacchetti
- Educating for Democracy: Preparing Undergraduates for Lives of Responsible Political Engagement (2007) with Anne Colby, Elizabeth Beaumont and Josh Corngold
- Rethinking Undergraduate Business Education: Liberal Learning for the Profession (2011) with Anne Colby, William Sullivan and Jonathan Dolle
- Civic Work, Civic Lessons: Two Generations Reflect on Public Service (2013) with Ernestine Fu

Academic offices
Preceded by John W. Ryan	President of Indiana University; 1987–1994	Succeeded by Myles Brand
