= Eskenazi Museum of Art =

Museum in Bloomington, Indiana, U.S.

Eskenazi Museum of Art at Indiana University
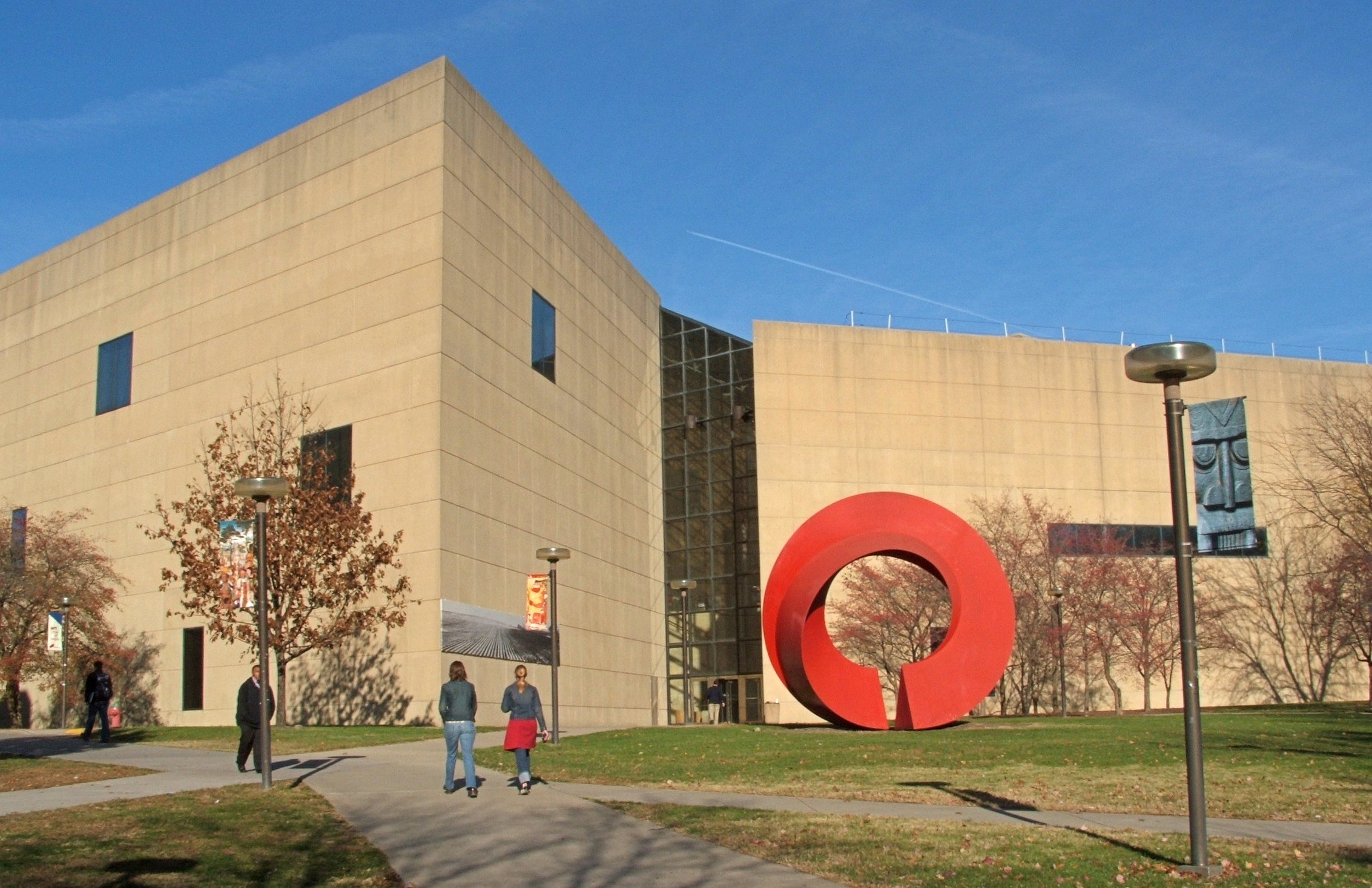
- Eskenazi Museum of Art in 2004
- Established: 1941; 85 years ago
- Location: 1133 E 7th St, Indiana University, Bloomington, Indiana, U.S.
- Coordinates: 39.169135°N 86.519814°W
- Type: Art Museum
- Website: artmuseum.indiana.edu

The Sidney and Lois Eskenazi Museum of Art at Indiana University is an art museum at Indiana University Bloomington in Bloomington, Indiana, United States. It was opened in 1941 as the Indiana University Museum of Art under the direction of Henry Radford Hope.

The present museum building was designed by I.M. Pei and Partners and dedicated in 1982. The museum's collection comprises approximately 45,000 objects, with about 1,400 on display. The collection includes items ranging from ancient jewelry to paintings by Pablo Picasso and Jackson Pollock. In May 2016, after the announcement of the largest cash gift in the museum's history, the museum was renamed the Sidney and Lois Eskenazi Museum of Art in honor of Indianapolis-based philanthropists Sidney and Lois Eskenazi. The museum is located on the Indiana University Bloomington campus at 1133 E. Seventh Street.

== History ==
The Eskenazi Museum of Art opened in 1941 in a gallery space in Mitchell Hall under the newly appointed head of the Department of Fine Arts, Henry Radford Hope. The first exhibition, Sixteen Brown County Painters, opened on November 21, 1941. The catalog for the event contained a statement describing the goals of the gallery at the time:

“The purpose of the Art Center Gallery… is to bring temporary loan exhibitions to the campus so that students may have an opportunity to study and see original works of art. Examples of diverse character will be brought to this gallery in order to show the multiple aspects of art both past and present.”

Establishing a permanent collection did not come to fruition until after World War II. In 1955, art collectors James and Marvelle Adams gave Indiana University a terracotta bust by Aristide Maillol, which inspired Hope to revive the goal to create a permanent collection for an art museum at Indiana University. The William Lowe Bryan Memorial Fund, a fund initiated by James Adams in honor of the university's tenth president and in support for the blooming museum, financed almost all of the museum's acquisitions in the early years. Hope also contributed to the museum, giving a number of important works including Pablo Picasso's The Studio. In the formative years of the museum, the late 1950s, 60s, and 70s, gifts to the museum accumulated rapidly.

The museum moved into the gallery space in the newly built Fine Arts building on campus, right next to the auditorium, in 1962. Encouraged by then-University Chancellor Herman B Wells, the Board of Trustees of the university started budgeting a small amount for the museum each year, with additional special allocations for the Art Museum to grow the collection.

In 1968, Hope hired Thomas T. Solley as the museum's Assistant Director. Solley became Director in 1971 after Hope retired. Solley, a trained architect, was perfectly suited to start the process of establishing a separate building for the art museum. Wanting an architect with museum-design experience, Solley and the university gave the project to I.M. Pei and Partners in 1974. Completed in 1982, the space had three galleries for permanent collections and one gallery for special exhibitions. Solley grew the collection from 4,000 works to 30,000 in his years at the museum.

Thomas T. Solley resigned in 1986 and Adelheid M. Gealt was appointed director the following year. Gealt served until 2015, and under her leadership the museum was a 2012 recipient of an Andrew J. Mellon Foundation endowment challenge grant, a $500,000 award.

Adelheid Gealt retired from the museum at the end of June 2015, at which point David A. Brenneman became the museum's Wilma E. Kelley Director.

In 2016, the museum received a major gift of $15 million from Indianapolis-based philanthropists Sidney and Lois Eskenazi to fund a full renovation of the museum's building. The museum was renamed in their honor in recognition of the gift. In May 2017, the museum closed for renovation. The renovation was completed in 2019, and the museum reopened to the public in November that year.

In late 2023, the museum canceled a planned retrospective exhibition of Palestinian artist Samia Halaby, a 1963 graduate of the university's MFA program. A university spokesperson told The New York Times in early 2024 that "academic leaders and campus officials canceled the exhibit due to concerns about guaranteeing the integrity of the exhibit for its duration," but Halaby told the Times that before the cancelation the museum's director had informed her of staff members' concerns over her social media posts in support of Palestinian causes and her comparing of the Israeli bombing of the Gaza Strip in the Gaza war to genocide. Several free expression organizations, including PEN America and the National Coalition Against Censorship called on the university and museum to reinstate the exhibition, and Halaby's supporters created a petition asking the president of the university to do so. Michigan State University's Broad Art Museum hosted the exhibition in June 2024 as originally planned.

In 2025, Mindy N. Besaw was hired as the museum's Wilma E. Kelley Director.

== Collections ==
The museum features four permanent collections galleries: the Jane Fortune Gallery, featuring European and American art through the 18th century; the Modern and Contemporary gallery, featuring European and American art from the 19th century on; the Ancient, Asian, and Islamic Art gallery; and the Raymond and Laura Wielgus Gallery of the Arts of Africa, Oceania, and Indigenous Art of the Americas. In addition to the permanent collections galleries, the museum has three gallery spaces for rotating exhibitions: the Special Exhibitions gallery; the Time-based Media Gallery, which focuses on film, new media, and similar types of art; and the Rhonda and Anthony Moravec Gallery in the Prints, Drawings, and Photographs Center.

In the museum's Ancient, Asian, and Islamic Art gallery, ancient Chinese porcelains, Japanese paintings, classical Greek, Roman, and Etruscan vases, bronzes, and mosaics are on display. The Burton Y. Berry Collection of Ancient Jewelry consists of 5,000 pieces from across the ancient world.

Works by German and Austrian Expressionists August Macke, Ernst Ludwig Kirchner, Alexej von Jawlensky, Max Beckmann, and Emil Nolde, along with early modern European and American masters such as Fernand Léger, Marcel Duchamp, Georges Braque, and Kurt Schwitters, are in the museum's collection. American abstract artists such as Stuart Davis, Frank Stella, and Joseph Cornell are also featured in the museum's collection. The works-on-paper collection includes major works by Albrecht Dürer, Rembrandt van Rijn, and Francisco Goya. The photography collection includes the archives of Henry Holmes Smith, Art Sinsabaugh, and Jeffrey A. Wolin.

There are also European Old Master paintings by Niccolo di Buonaccorso, Apollonio di Giovanni, Taddeo Gaddi, Vittore Crivelli, Felipe Vigarny, Gerard Terborch the Elder, Emanuel de Witte, Bernardo Strozzi, and Jean Louis Laneuville, among others. There are also 19th century European paintings by Jean-Léon Gérôme, Charles Daubigny, Gustave Caillebotte ("Yerres, Rain Effect"), and Claude Monet ("Port of Argentieul") among others.

The museum features temporary exhibitions in its Featured Exhibitions, Time-based Media, and Rhonda and Anthony Moravec galleries.

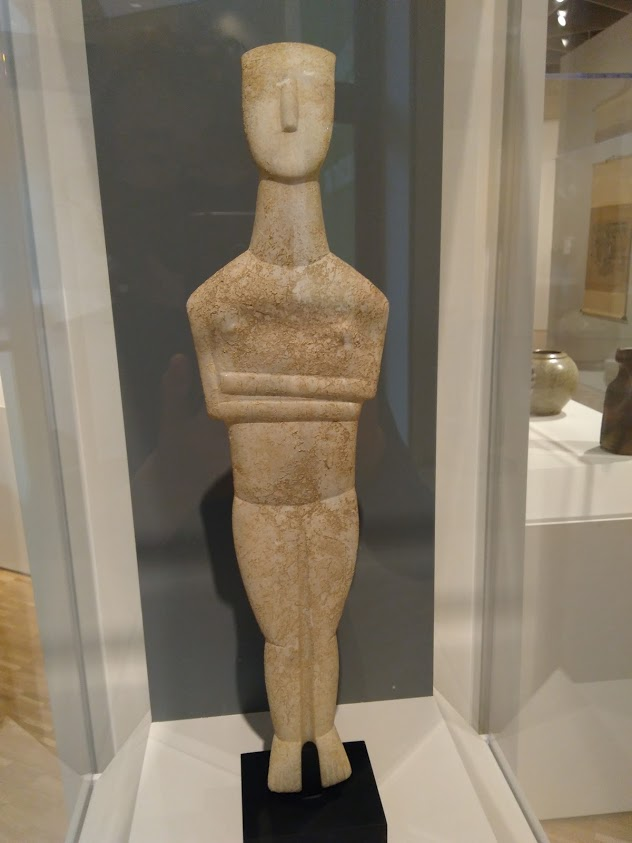
Cycladic, attributed to the Goulandris Master. Woman, ca. 2500–2400 BCE. Eskenazi Museum of Art, Indiana University, 76.25

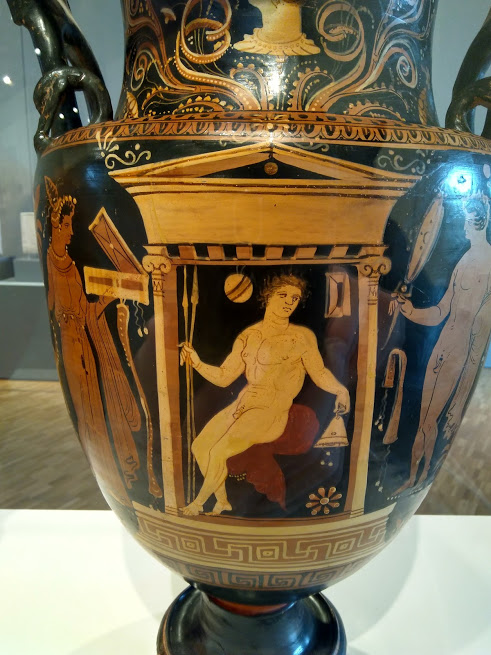
Late fourth-century BCE Greek red-figure volute krater. Eskenazi Museum of Art, Indiana University

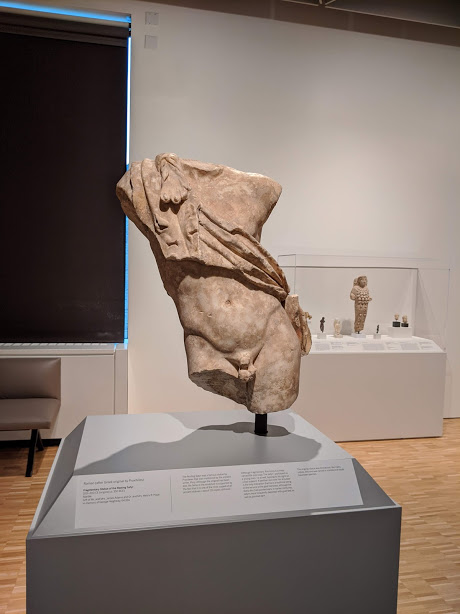
Roman, after Greek original by Praxiteles. Torso with Panther Skin, 100–200 CE. Marble, 33 1/2 x 20 1/2 x 11. Gift of Mr. and Mrs. James Adams and Dr. and Mrs. Henry R. Hope in memory of George Heighway, Eskenazi Museum of Art, Indiana University, 64.104

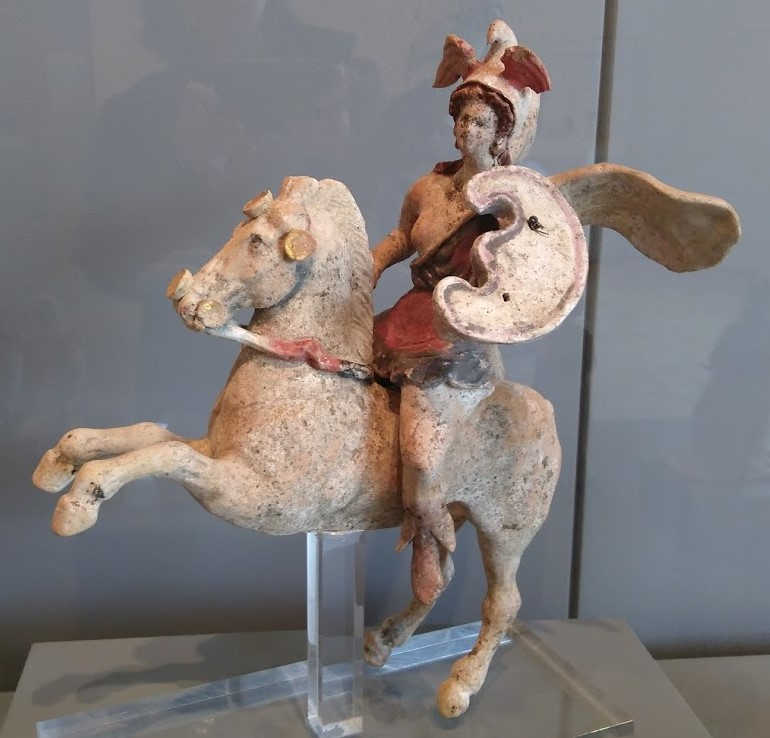
Greek. Amazon Riding Horse, 330–280 BCE. Terracotta, added color, and gold. Eskenazi Museum of Art, Indiana University, 81.8

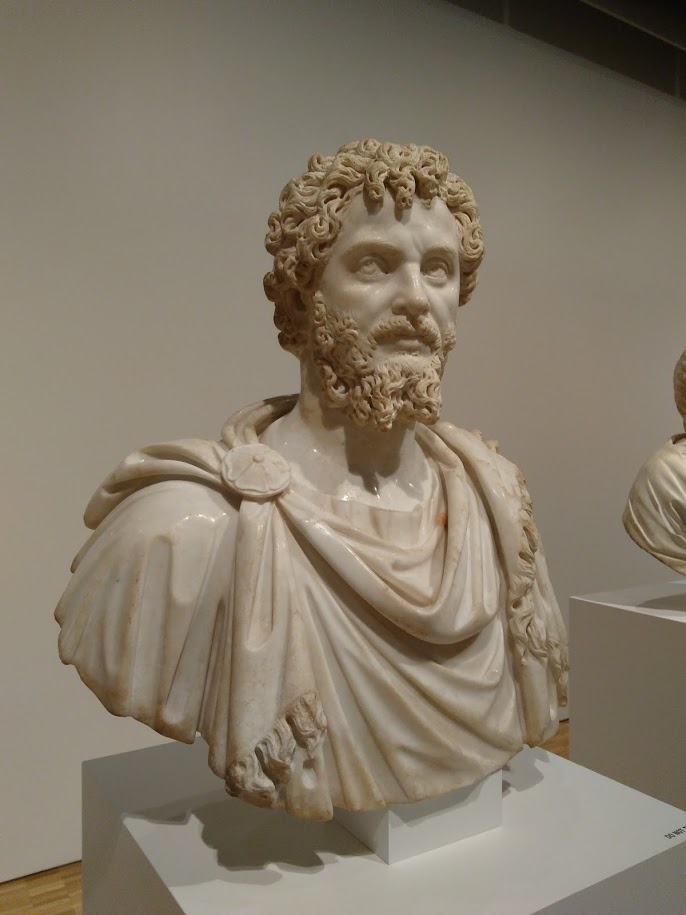
Roman. Bust of Emperor Septimius Severus, 200–210 CE. Marble, 30 5/16 in. Gift of Thomas T. Solley, Eskenazi Museum of Art, Indiana University, 75.33.1

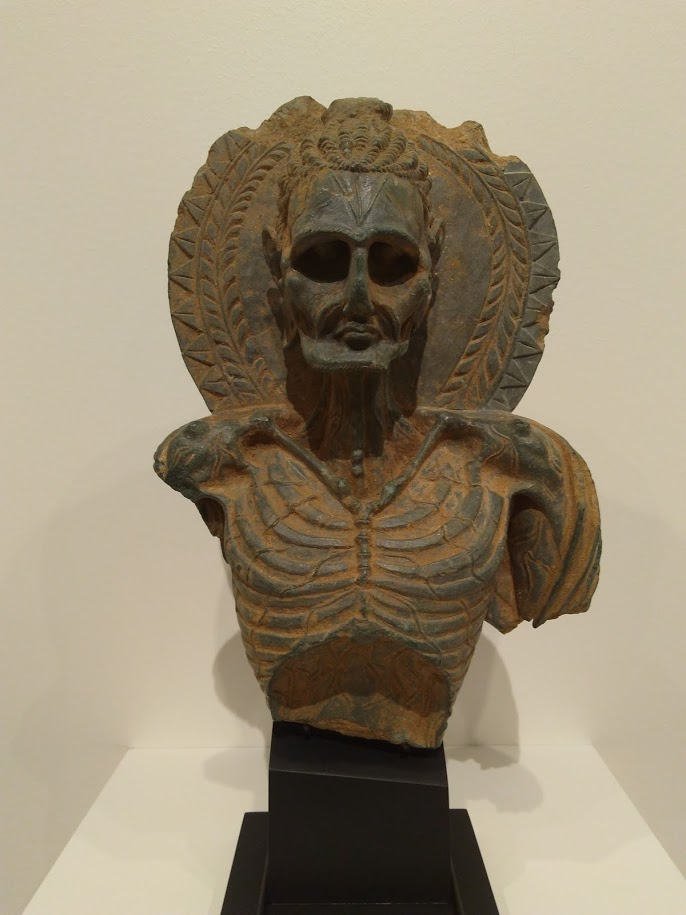
Gandharan. Fasting Buddha, 2nd–3rd century CE. Schist with traces of gilding, 9 7/8 x 7 x 3 1/8 in. Eskenazi Museum of Art, Indiana University, 79.53

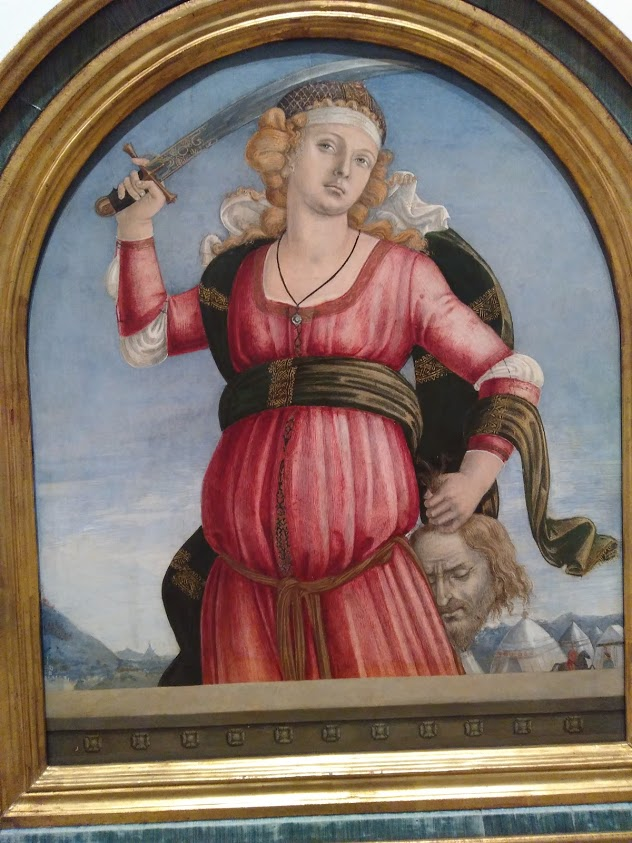
Attributed to Matteo di Giovanni (Italian, 1430–1495). Judith with the Head of Holofernes, ca. 1490. Oil on panel, 27 3/8 x 23 5/8 x 3 5/8 in. The Samuel H. Kress Study Collection, Eskenazi Museum of Art, Indiana University, 62.163

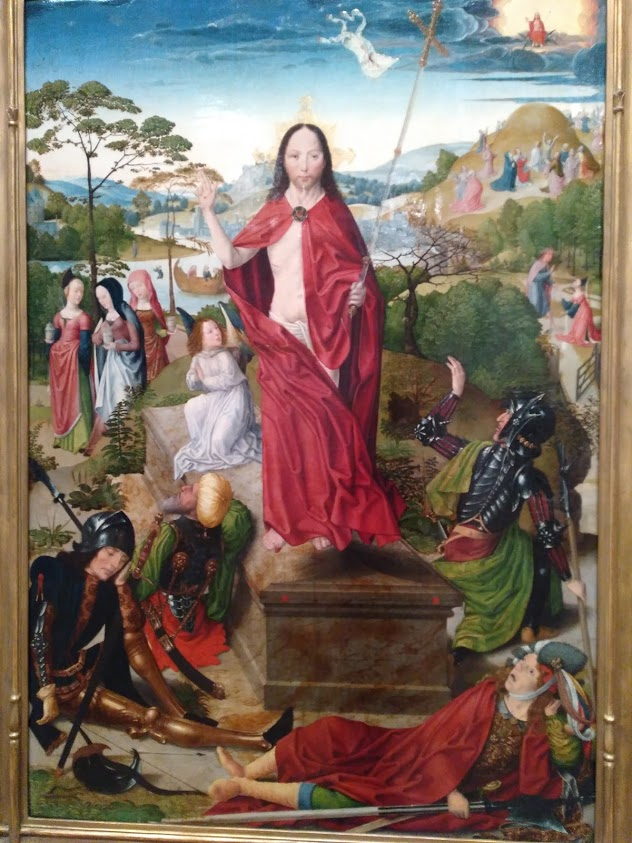
Master of the Holy Kinship (German, active 1480–1518 in Cologne). Resurrection, ca 1490. Oil on panel, 56 x 39 1/4 x 2 1/2. Given in memory of Marguerite Lilly Noyes by Thomas T. Solley, Eskenazi Museum of Art, Indiana University, 78.62.2

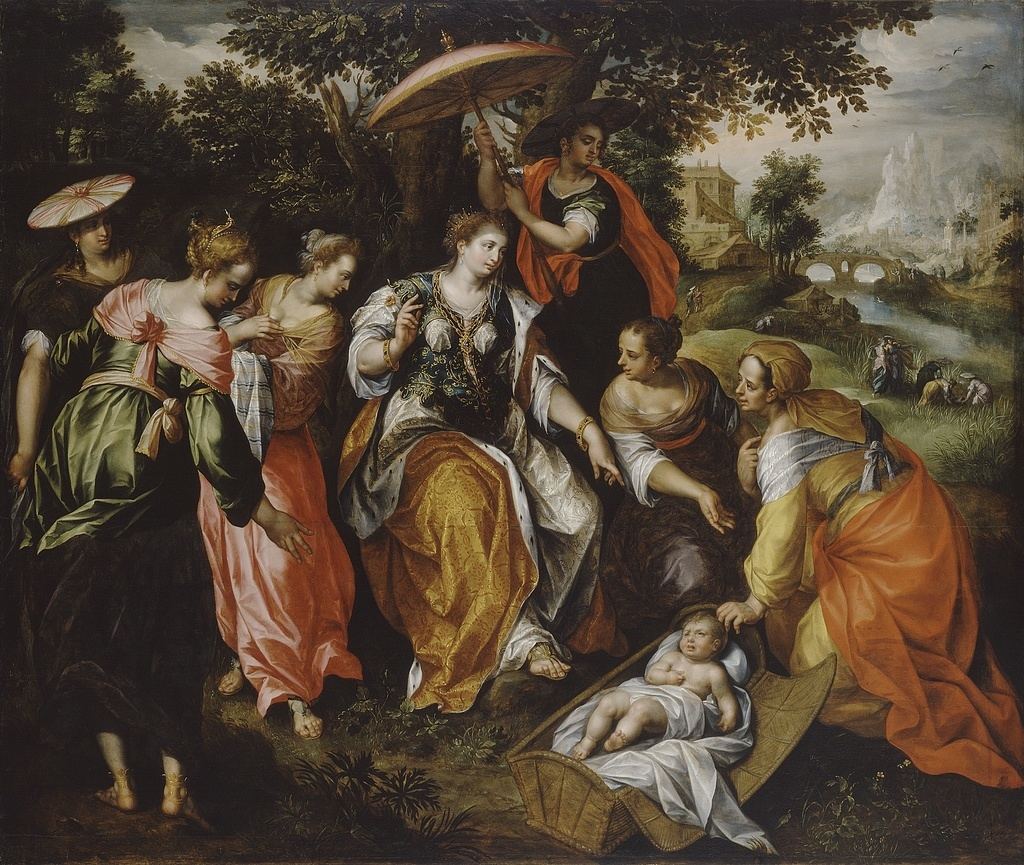
Hendrick de Clerck (Flemish, ca. 1570–1630). The Finding of Moses, ca. 1600–1620. Oil on panel, 61 1/2 x 72 x 3 in. Gift of Mr. Stanley S. Wulc, Eskenazi Museum of Art, Indiana University, 66.24

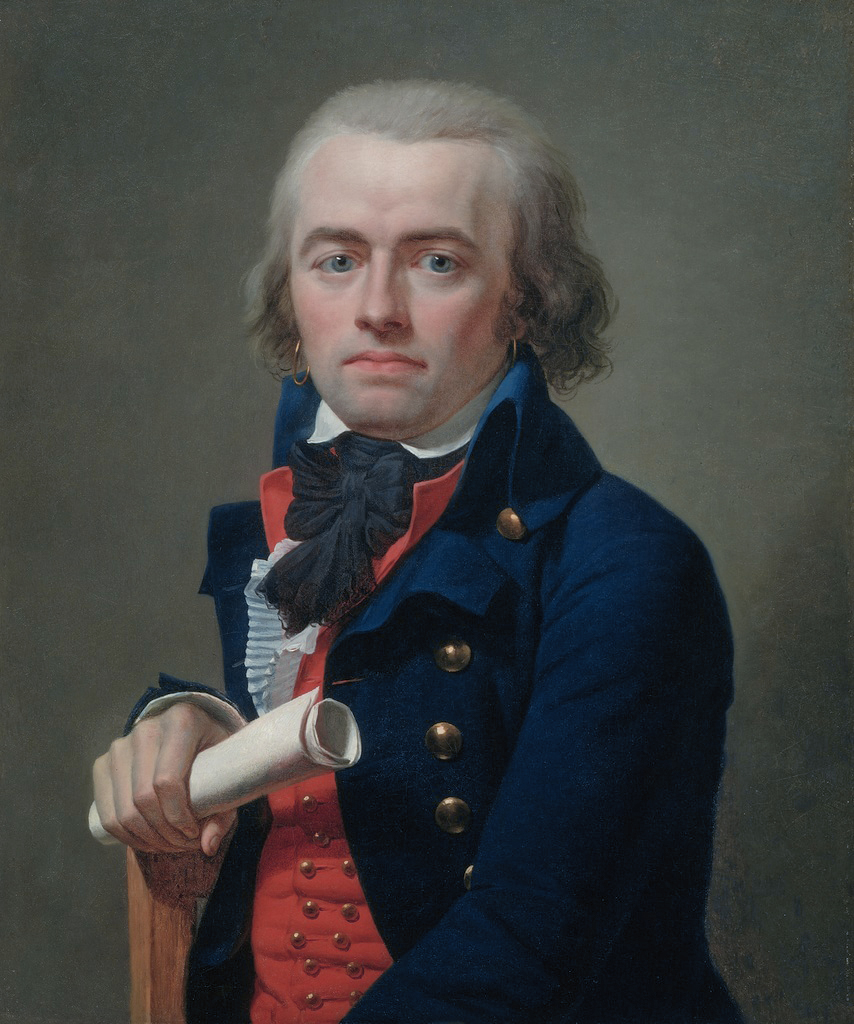
Jean Louis Laneuville (French, 1748–1826). Portrait of Jean de Bry, ca. 1793. Oil on canvas, 34 x 29 3/4 x 2 3/4 in. Eskenazi Museum of Art, Indiana University, 77.54.1

== Education and programs ==
The museum has education programs where schools in 51 of the 90 counties in Indiana participate, allowing a reach of about 7,000 students per year. The museum partners with 55 different university academic departments to provide curriculum-based tours for students at the university.

Public programs include a student-hosted visiting artist series, where contemporary artists discuss their practices and processes; Art and a Movie, a partnership with the IU Cinema that pairs films with special programming about art, artists, and historical context; docent-led gallery tours; and social programs designed for friends and family to experience the museum together. The museum also employs an art therapist for its Arts-based Wellness program, providing programming focused on mental health, well-being, and community to both university affiliates and the public.

Following the museum's renovation, four new learning were established to teach about the museum and its collection. These are the Center for Conservation, the Center for Curatorial Studies, the Center for Prints, Drawings, and Photographs, and the Kimberly and John Simpson Center for Education.

== I.M. Pei-designed Building ==
The building, designed by I.M. Pei and Partners, was completed in 1982. The museum was constructed as a play on angles. It is rumored to have no right angles, however this is not true. The floors meet the walls at a ninety-degree angle, and there are many square and rectangular windows in the building. The design features two concrete triangles connected by a glass-ceiling atrium. The museum is 105,000 square feet: 38,361 square feet are devoted to gallery space, and 18,000 square feet comprise the atrium. The other space is used for offices, gift shop, storage, and the outdoor Sculpture Terrace.

== Luzetta and Del Newkirk Café and Gift Shop ==
The Luzetta and Del Café and Gift Shop, located on the second floor of the Eskenazi Museum of Art, sells an array of art-inspired products for guests to purchase, along with a selection of food and beverage options. The Newkirk Café has indoor seating, as well as outdoor seating located on the Sculpture Terrace.

In August 2019, the Eskenazi Museum of Art announced that a contemporary art installation by British designer Paul Cocksedge had been installed in the renovated café space. The installation, titled A Gust of Wind, is made up of satin-finish acrylic cast into sheets made to resemble paper. They are suspended from the ceiling and give the appearance of a cloud of sheets of white paper blowing into the museum's Atrium from the outdoor Sculpture Terrace entrance.

== Light Totem ==
The Light Totem installation at the Eskenazi Museum of Art was completed in 2007. It was commissioned as a temporary installation to celebrate the 25–year anniversary of the Eskenazi Museum of Art building. Due to its popularity with the campus and community, Light Totem was approved by the Board of Trustees to become a permanent fixture outside the museum in 2010. Artist Robert Shakespeare used LEDs (light-emitting diodes) to illuminate both the 70-foot freestanding tower, and the 40-foot tube within the atrium of the museum.

The Light Totem also illuminates the wall of the Art Museum with a computerized display of changing colors. Each of the lighted sections can be programmed to project any color and change color up to every tenth of a second. The entire display uses only 3,000 watts of electricity, about the amount used when a hair dryer and toaster are running simultaneously, according to the artist. Students often can be seen lying on their backs with their feet up on the wall, watching the colors change.
