= William Lowe Bryan =

President of Indiana University, United States (1860–1955)

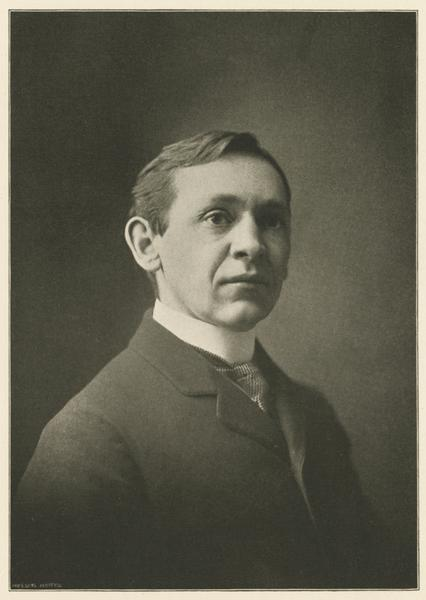
- Bryan c. 1898

10th President of the Indiana University
- In office 1902–1937
- Preceded by: Joseph Swain
- Succeeded by: Herman B Wells

Personal details
- Born: November 11, 1860 Monroe County, Indiana, US
- Died: November 21, 1955 (aged 95) Bloomington, Indiana, US
- Resting place: Crown Hill Cemetery and Arboretum, Section 42, Lot 181; 39.8217121°N 86.1661503°W

Academic background
- Education: Indiana University; Clark University
- Thesis: On the development of voluntary motor ability, with a preface on the requirements of work in experimental psychology (1892)
- Doctoral advisor: G. Stanley Hall
- Other advisor: David Starr Jordan

Academic work
- Discipline: Psychology
- Institutions: Indiana University

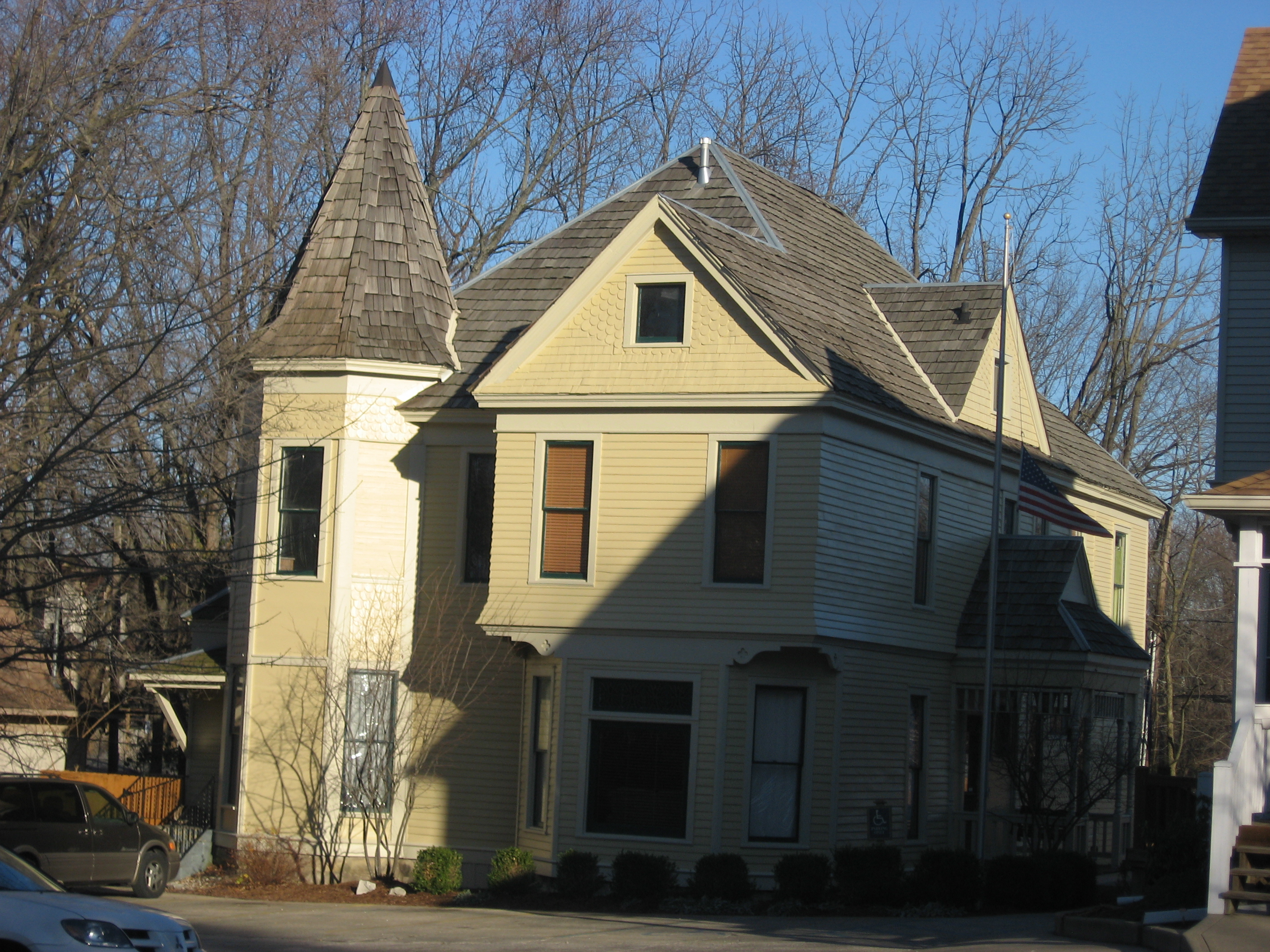
Bryan's house in Bloomington

William Lowe Bryan (November 11, 1860 – November 21, 1955) was the 10th president of Indiana University, serving from 1902 to 1937.

== Early life and education ==
William Lowe Bryan was born William Julian Bryan on November 11, 1860, in Monroe County, Indiana. His father, John Bryan was a Presbyterian minister and his mother was Eliza Phillips Bryan. He attended public schools in the county. Having been born near Bloomington, Bryan entered the Preparatory Department of Indiana University in 1877. While a student at IU, he was a member of the university baseball team where he earned his letter and was active in the student newspaper, The Daily Student. Bryan graduated from IU with a degree in ancient classics in 1884. He continued his studies and received a Master's degree in Philosophy in 1886. However, his interests shifted toward psychology. From 1886 to 1887, Bryan went to Germany to study at the University of Berlin. He went on to earn his Ph.D. in psychology from Clark University in 1892 under the direction of G. Stanley Hall.

== Career ==
After graduating with his undergraduate degree in 1884, Bryan was appointed English instructor in the Preparatory Department at Indiana University. Within a few months, he was invited to join the faculty of the Greek Department. In 1885, he was named Associate Professor of Philosophy. When he returned from studying at the University of Berlin, Bryan was named full professor and granted money to conduct research on human reaction times. In January 1888, he opened the Indiana University Psychological Laboratory. Bryan went on to become a leader in the movement for the scientific study of children. In 1892, Bryan helped organize the American Psychological Association and became one of its charter members.

Upon returning to IU after his studies with Hall, Bryan was appointed Vice-President of the University. In 1902, he was named the tenth president of Indiana University. Bryan oversaw the development of IU for 35 years. During his tenure, the schools of medicine, education, nursing, business, music, and dentistry were established. Additionally, many graduate programs and several satellite campus throughout the state were established. While Bryan was president, the university grew from 1,335 students and 65 faculty members to 7,005 students and 330 faculty members.

One of the early challenges of Bryan's presidency was providing the university campus with a sufficient amount of water for its operation. (Bloomington, and the IU campus in particular, is located on a high ground without any major rivers or lakes in the vicinity, and with little usable groundwater). The city's waterworks existing in the early 20th century being utterly inadequate, Bryan commissioned a team of IU researchers, led by the geologist E.R. Cumings, to investigate the campus' water situation. On March 8, 1910, the Cumings commission recommended a site for the new reservoir, a couple miles northeast of the campus; the reservoir, which became known as the University Lake, was constructed in 1910–1914. Although no longer used for water supply, the reservoir remains, and is the centerpiece of Indiana University's Research and Teaching Preserve (Griffy Woods).

== Marriage ==
Bryan married Charlotte Lowe in July 1889. They took one another's last names, so thereafter Bryan was known as William Lowe Bryan. Charlotte had a Bachelor's degree in Greek and continued to study on her own after their marriage. Bryan and Charlotte collaborated on two volumes of selections from Plato for teachers. Charlotte was often ill throughout her life, and Bryan often turned down social invitations so he could stay with his wife. She died in 1948.

== Death ==
William Lowe Bryan died in Bloomington in 1955. He was buried next to his wife at Crown Hill Cemetery in Indianapolis.

== Books ==
- Studies in Platoʼs Republic, 1898
- On the psychology of learning a life occupation, 1941
- The measured and the not-yet-measured, 1947

== See also ==
- American philosophy
- List of American philosophers

Academic offices
Preceded by Joseph Swain	President of Indiana University; 1902–1937	Succeeded by Herman B Wells
