= Findlay Galleries =

Commercial art gallery

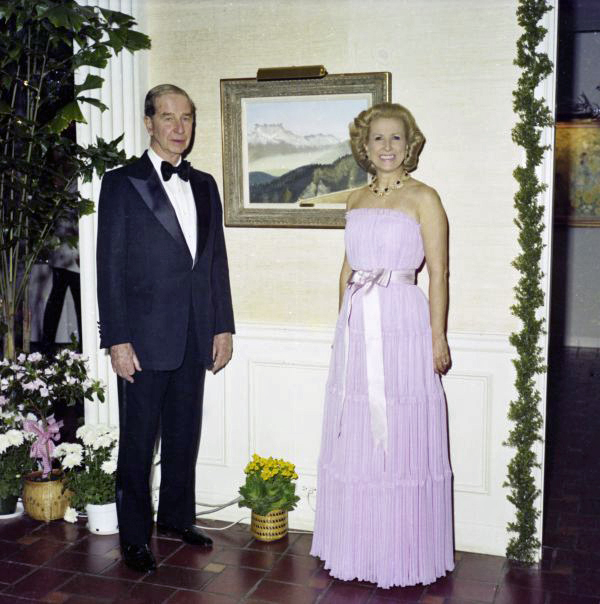
Mr. and Mrs. C.V. Whitney at Findlay Galleries in Palm Beach, 1978

Findlay Galleries is a commercial art gallery with locations in New York and Palm Beach.

== History ==
Findlay Galleries was founded as "Findlay Art Rooms" In Kansas City, Missouri, in 1870, by William Wadsworth Findlay. Initially, the company sold art supplies (including paints, brushes, canvas, etc.) as well as paintings. William's son, Walstein C. Findlay, took over the business. One of the senior Wally's innovations was that of acquiring art directly from the capitals of Europe and bringing them back to the United States for resale.

Wally Findlay, Jr. joined the company in 1932, and under his leadership, the company expanded geographically opening a gallery in Chicago in 1931. In 1961, the gallery in Palm Beach was opened, followed by New York in 1964. In 1971, the company opened galleries in Beverly Hills and Paris.

In August 1969, Wally Findlay Galleries became a public company. The stock traded over-the-counter. In 1973, Findlay bought back 100% of the outstanding stock.

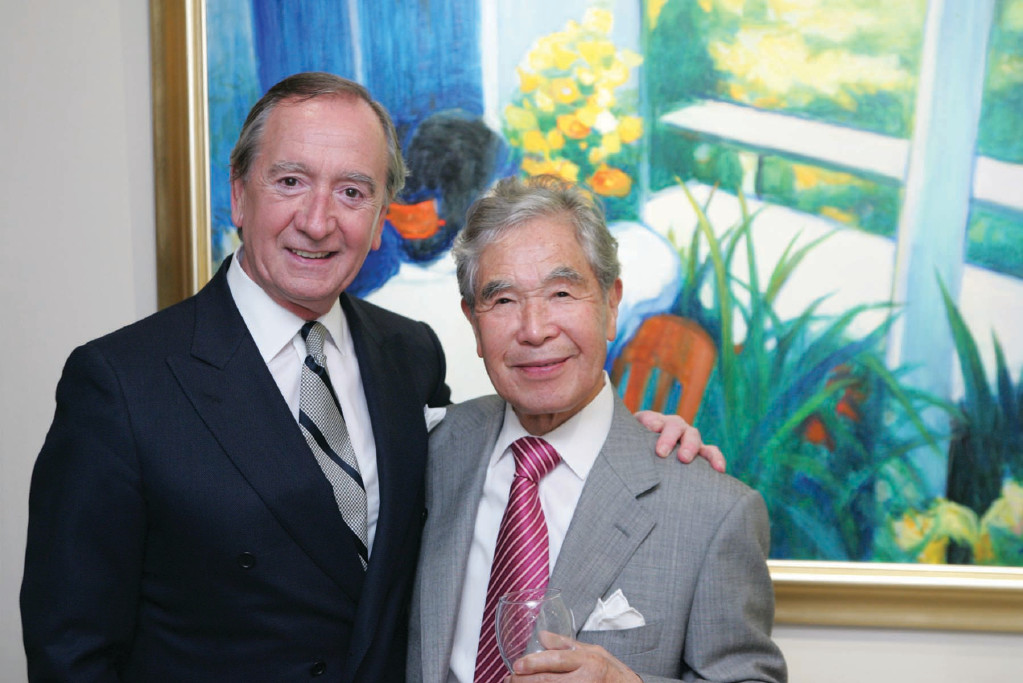
James R. Borynack and the painter Tadashi Asoma

Toward the end of the 1970s, Findlay sought to franchise the business. In the fall of 1980, James R. Borynack, then a company senior vice president (and future owner of the company), bought the Wally Findlay Galleries in New York as the first franchisee. That same year, Louis Stern franchised the Beverly Hills branch. In 1984, with the franchise system breaking down, Findlay again bought 100% of the company back. When Wally Findlay died in 1996, leaving no heirs. He left his company to his employees who managed it while looking for a buyer. James Borynack rejoined the company that year and purchased the company from the estate shortly thereafter.

In April 2016, Wally Findlay Galleries and David Findlay Jr. Gallery merged and continued operations under the name "Findlay Galleries."
