= Boussay, Indre-et-Loire =

Boussay
- Commune
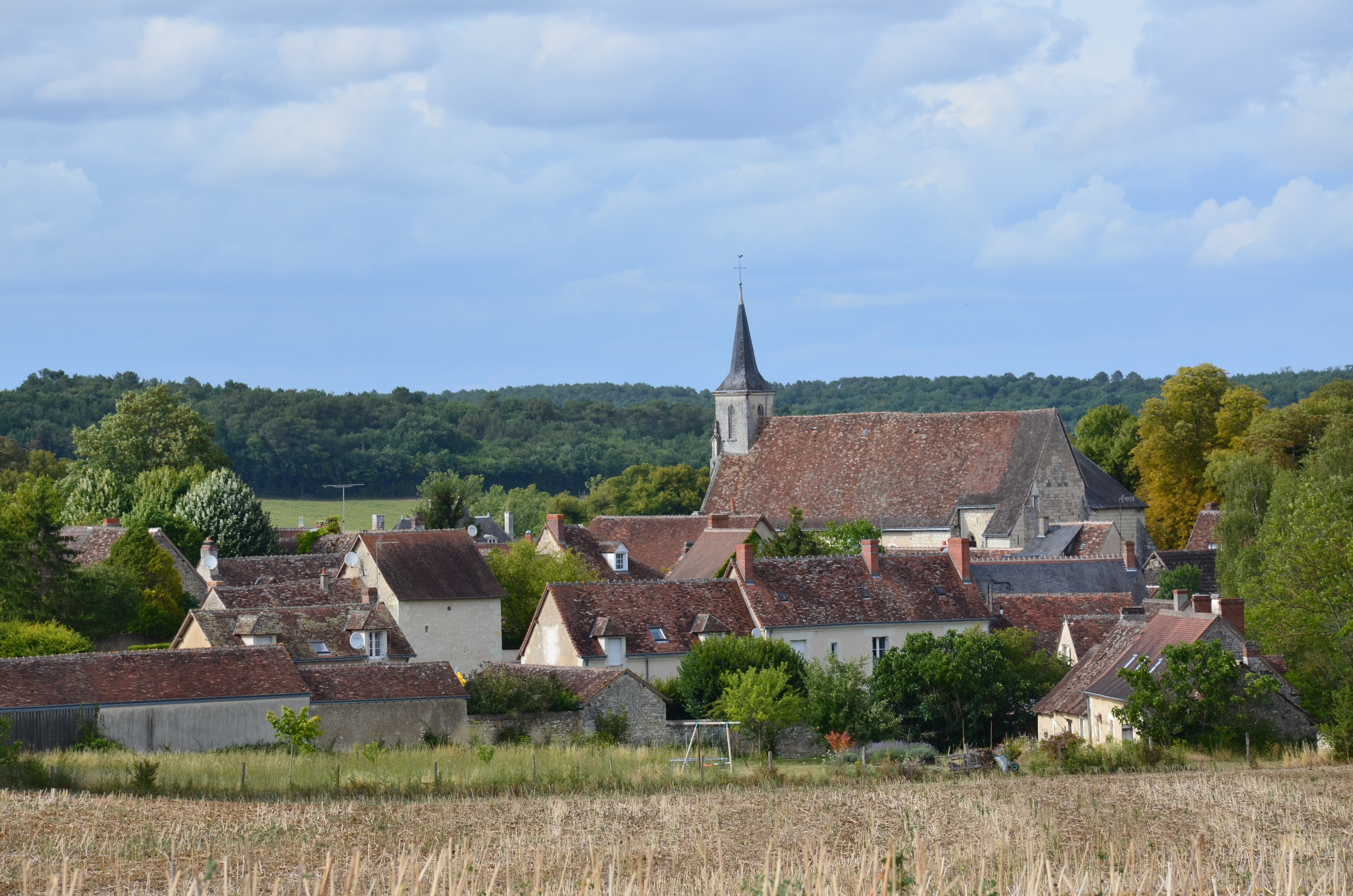
- A general view of Boussay
- Location of Boussay
- Location within France Location within Centre-Val de Loire
- Coordinates: 46°50′34″N 0°53′21″E
- Country: France
- Region: Centre-Val de Loire
- Department: Indre-et-Loire
- Arrondissement: Loches
- Canton: Descartes
- Intercommunality: CC Loches Sud Touraine

Government
  - Mayor (2020–2026): Marc de Becdelievre
- Area^{1}: 27.54 km^{2} (10.63 sq mi)
- Highest elevation: 137 m (449 ft)
- Lowest elevation: 62 m (203 ft)
- Population (2023): 237
  - Density: 8.61/km^{2} (22.3/sq mi)
- Time zone: UTC+01:00 (CET)
  - Summer (DST): UTC+02:00 (CEST)
- INSEE/Postal code: 37033 /37290
- ^{1} French Land Register data, which excludes lakes, ponds, glaciers > 1 km^{2} (0.386 sq mi or 247 acres) and river estuaries.

Boussay (French pronunciation: [busɛ]) is a commune in the Indre-et-Loire department in central France.

== Population ==
Historical population
Year	Pop.	±% p.a.
1968	340	—
1975	287	−2.39%
1982	271	−0.82%
1990	269	−0.09%
1999	268	−0.04%
2007	249	−0.91%
2012	262	+1.02%
2017	218	−3.61%
2023	237	+1.40%
Source: INSEE

== Sights ==
- The Château de Boussay

== See also ==
- Communes of the Indre-et-Loire department
