= Hamilton Lugar School of Global and International Studies =

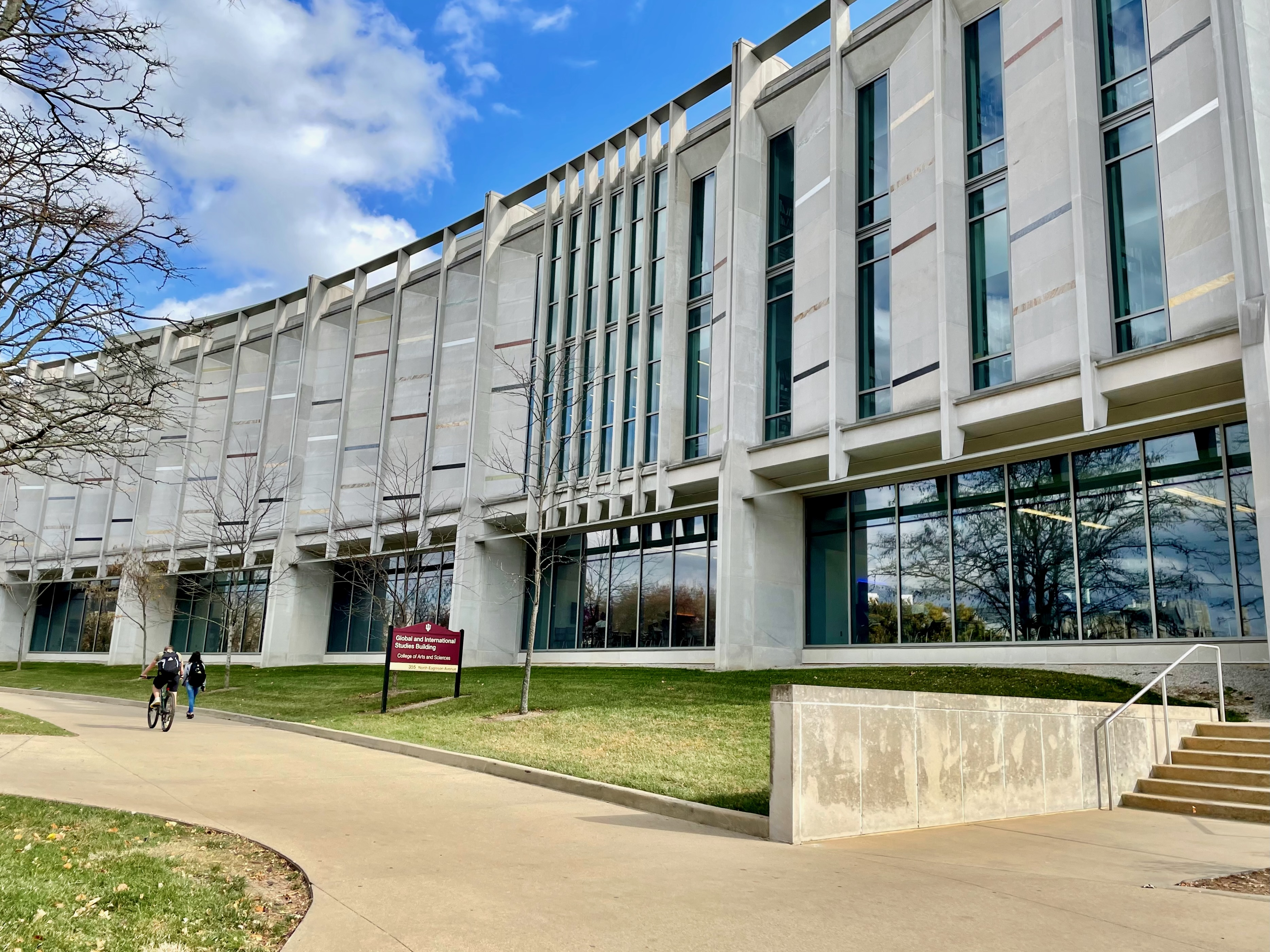
- Type: Public international affairs and area studies school
- Established: 2012; 14 years ago
- Parent institution: Indiana University
- Location: Bloomington, Indiana, United States; 39.1701°N 86.5174°W
- Website: hls.indiana.edu

The Hamilton Lugar School of Global and International Studies, or Hamilton Lugar School (HLS), previously known as School of Global and International Studies (SGIS), is a school within the Indiana University Bloomington's College of Arts and Sciences. Established in 2012 and officially named in 2018 to honor U.S. statesmen Lee Hamilton and Richard Lugar, the school is dedicated to the study of international affairs, languages, and area studies.

The school of an affiliate member of the Association of Professional Schools of International Affairs.

== History ==
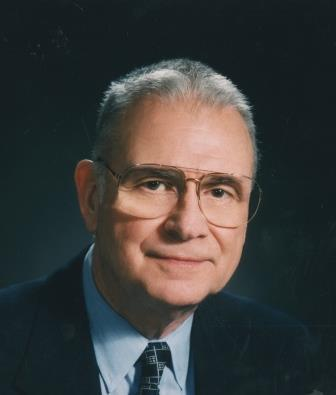
Lee Hamilton

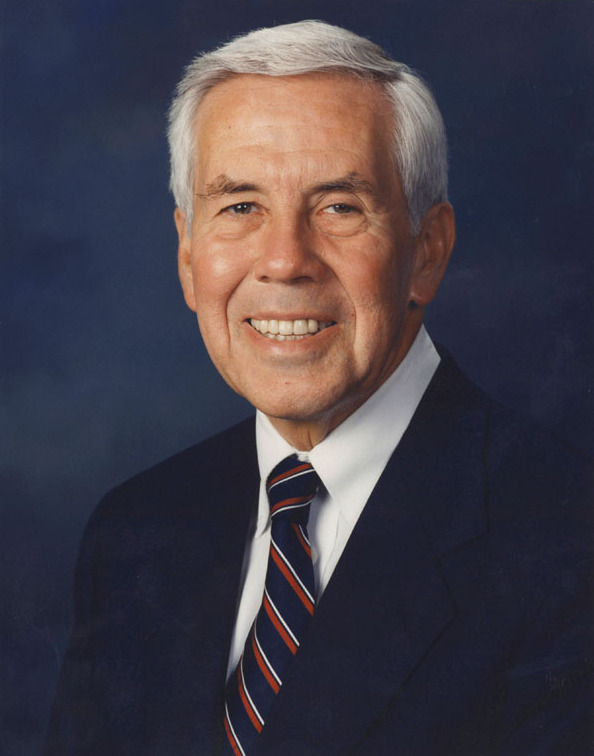
Richard Lugar

Indiana University's emphasis on area studies and global studies dates back to the 19th century, with modern language instruction beginning in 1836 and international law incorporated into the curriculum by 1842.

In 2012, the university formalized its global focus by establishing the School of Global and International Studies. In April, 2013, a ceremony celebrated the school's inauguration and groundbreaking of the School of Global and International Studies building. U.S. Sen. Dan Coats, provided the keynote, and Vice President Joe Biden gave a message by video. Former Sen. Richard Lugar and former Rep. Lee Hamilton, professors of practice at the new school, were present as well. On October 15, 2015, Secretary of State John Kerry visited the school to celebrate the building opening.

On October 3, 2018, the school was renamed the Hamilton Lugar School of Global and International Studies to honor Lee Hamilton and Richard Lugar, both of whom served as distinguished scholars and professors of practice at the institution.

== Academics ==
=== Programs ===
HLS offers a comprehensive range of undergraduate and graduate programs that integrate language proficiency, regional expertise, and policy analysis. Undergraduate offerings include majors such as International Studies, Cybersecurity and Global Policy, and International Law and Institutions.

=== Departments ===
HLS encompasses four academic departments:

- Department of Central Eurasian Studies
- Department of East Asian Languages and Cultures
- Department of International Studies
- Department of Middle Eastern Languages and Cultures

Additionally, the school houses numerous centers and programs focused on specific regions and thematic areas.

=== Centers and Institutes ===
- African Studies Program
- Center for the Study of Global Change
- Center for Latin American and Caribbean Studies
- Center for the Study of the Middle East
- East Asian Studies Center
- Institute for European Studies
- Institute for Korean Studies
- Inner Asian and Uralic National Resource Center
- Dhar India Studies Program
- Islamic Studies Program
- Polish Studies Center
- Robert F. Byrnes Russian and East European Institute
- Southeast Asian and ASEAN Studies
- Tobias Center for Innovation in International Development
- 21st Century Japan Politics and Society Initiative

=== Language programs and resource centers ===
- Language Workshop (home to the Indiana University Summer Language Workshop)
- Arabic Language Flagship
- Chinese Language Flagship
- Center for Languages of the Central Asian Region
- Global Indigenous Studies Network
- National African Language Resource Center

== Leadership ==
Lee Feinstein served as the founding dean of HLS, bringing experience as the U.S. Ambassador to Poland and a senior fellow at the Council on Foreign Relations. In January 2022, Nick Cullather was named interim dean after Feinstein announced he had accepted a new position in Washington as president of McLarty Associates. In February 2024, John D. Ciorciari was named as the new dean, a role he assumed in March 2024, continuing the school's mission to prepare students for leadership in global affairs.

David Bosco has served as executive associate dean since August 2023. Isak Nti Asare has served as assistant dean for undergraduate education and student affairs since August 2023.

== Alumni ==
HLS alumni have pursued impactful careers across various sectors. Members of the Emerging Leaders Council include individuals such as Navjot Dhadwal, a lieutenant junior grade in the U.S. Navy; Asya Kislyuk, policy programs manager at Instagram; and Andrea Vega Yudico, associate producer at NHK.

== See also ==
- O'Neill School of Public and Environmental Affairs
