= Non-interventionism =

Foreign policy principle

Non-interventionism or non-intervention is commonly understood as "a foreign policy of political or military non-involvement in foreign relations or in other countries' internal affairs". This is based on the grounds that a state should not interfere in the internal politics of another state as well as the principles of state sovereignty and self-determination. A similar phrase is "strategic independence".

Non-interventionism became a norm in international relations before World War I. During the Cold War, it was often violated in order to instigate revolutions, prevent revolutions, or protect international security. Many countries have since adopted their own interpretation of non-interventionism or modified it according to the responsibility to protect any population from egregious crimes.

== Terminology ==
In political science lexicon, the term "isolationism" is sometimes improperly used in place of "non-interventionism". "Isolationism" should be interpreted as a broader foreign policy that, in addition to non-interventionism, is associated with trade and economic protectionism, cultural and religious isolation, as well as non-participation in any permanent military alliance.

== History ==
The term "non-intervention" was used in the context of United States policy in 1915. The norm of non-intervention has dominated the majority of international relations and can be seen to have been one of the principal motivations for the United States initial non-interventionist policy in World Wars I and II, and the liberal powers' non-intervention in the Spanish Civil War despite the involvement of Germany and Italy. The norm was then firmly established into international law as one of the United Nations Charter's central tenets, which established non-intervention as one of the key principles which would underpin the emergent post-World War II peace.

However, this was soon affected by the advent of the Cold War, which increased the number and intensity of interventions in the domestic politics of a vast number of developing countries under pretexts such as instigating a "global socialist revolution" or ensuring "containment" of such a revolution. The adoption of such pretexts and the idea that such interventions were to prevent a threat to "international peace and security" allowed intervention under Chapter VII of the UN Charter. There must be a vote of nine member states out of fifteen, within the Security Council along with no vetoes from the five permanent members." Additionally, the UN's power to regulate such interventions was hampered during the Cold War due to both the US and USSR holding veto power in the United Nations Security Council.

== In different countries ==
=== China ===
Mutual non-interference has been one of China's principles on foreign policy since 1954. After the reform and opening up, China began to focus on industrial development and actively avoided military conflict over the subsequent decades. As of December 2018, China has used its veto eleven times in UN Security Council. China first used the veto on 25 August 1972 to block Bangladesh's admission to the UN. From 1971 to 2011, China used its veto sparingly, preferring to abstain rather than veto resolutions indirectly related to Chinese interests. According to David L. Bosco, China turned abstention into an "art form," abstaining on 30% of Security Council Resolutions between 1971 and 1976.

=== Sweden ===
Sweden became a non-interventionist state after the backlash against the king following Swedish losses in the Napoleonic Wars; the coup d'etat that followed in 1812 caused Jean Baptiste Bernadotte to establish a policy of non-intervention, which lasted from the end of the Napoleonic Wars in 1815 until the accession of Sweden into NATO in 2024.

=== Switzerland ===
Switzerland has long been known for its policy of defensively armed neutrality. Its neutrality allows for the protection of the state by strategically avoiding conflict to preserve the autonomy of the state, and prevent the large powers surrounding it from invading its borders. This strategy has kept Switzerland from joining conflicts that threaten its sovereignty as well as allow its diverse citizenry to form a sense of national unity.

=== United States ===
After the terrorist attacks on September 11th, 2001, the United States changed its foreign policy to support the idea that "norms of sovereignty" are not respected when there are threats of terrorism or weapons of mass destruction.

In December 2013 the Pew Research Center reported that their newest poll, "American's Place in the World 2013," had revealed that 52 percent of respondents in the national poll said that the United States "should mind its own business internationally and let other countries get along the best they can on their own." That was the most people to answer that question this way in the history of the question, which pollsters began asking in 1964. Only about a third of respondents felt that way a decade earlier.

=== Russia ===
On February 24, 2022, Russia invaded Ukraine and began to mobilize machinery, shelling operations, and continuous airstrikes in cities like Kyiv, Kharkiv, and Lviv. Following the intervention, the United Nations Security Council attempted to invoke a resolution in order to address the Ukrainian issue. Since Russia is one of the five permanent members, they could utilize their veto power to prevent the resolution from passing. Many countries imposed sanctions in response to the veto as an attempt to deter Russia from its intervention.

== Decline ==
Since the end of the Cold War, new emergent norms of humanitarian intervention are challenging the norm of non-intervention, based upon the argument that while sovereignty gives rights to states, there is also a responsibility to protect (R2P) its citizens. The ideal, an argument based upon social contract theory, has states being justified in intervening within other states if the latter fail to protect (or are actively involved in harming) their citizens. The R2P doctrine follows a "second duty" that employs states to intervene if another state is unwilling or unable to protect its citizens from gross human rights violations. Moreover, the International Criminal Court closely monitors states who are unable or unwilling to protect their citizens and investigate if they have committed egregious crimes. Non-intervention is not absolute. Michael Walzer's Just and Unjust Wars, which identifies three instances for when intervention is justifiable: "1) a particular community seeks secession or "natural liberation" within a set of boundaries; 2) counter-intervention is necessary to protect boundaries that already have been crossed; or 3) a terrible "violation of human rights," such as "cases of enslavement of massacre" has occurred. Nations use these guidelines to justify violating the non-intervention norm.

That idea has been used to justify the UN-sanctioned intervention Operation Provide Comfort in Northern Iraq in 1991 to protect the Kurds and in Somalia, UNOSOM I and UNOSOM II from 1992 to 1995 in the absence of state power. However, after the US "Black Hawk Down" event in 1993 in Mogadishu, the US refused to intervene in Rwanda or Haiti. However, despite strong opposition from Russia and China, the idea of the responsibility to protect was again used to justify NATO intervention in Kosovo in 1999 and the 2011 military intervention in Libya.

The new norm of humanitarian intervention is not universally accepted and is often seen as still developing.

== See also ==
- Interventionism
- Isolationism
- Neutral country
- A Few Words on Non-Intervention by John Stuart Mill
- International relations theory
- Prime Directive, a non-interventionist principle in the fictional Star Trek universe
- List of anti-war organizations
- List of countries without armed forces
- List of peace activists
