= Ciorciari =

Ciorciari is a surname. Notable people with the surname include:

- Diego Ciorciari (born 1980), Argentine basketball coach and former player
- John D. Ciorciari, American scholar of international politics and law
