= Indiana University Student Association =

Indiana University Student Government
- Motto: Custodire Lus Studiosum (Latin)
- Institution: Indiana University Bloomington
- Established: 12 May 1912
- Website: https://iustudentgovernment.indiana.edu/

The Indiana University Student Government (IUSG) is the undergraduate student body government at Indiana University Bloomington in Bloomington, Indiana. IUSG consists three branches: executive, legislative, and judicial. In addition to these three main branches, IUSG is also responsible for the Assisted Inter-Organization Development Funding Board, The IUSA Funding Board allocates funds for student programming and initiatives.

== History ==
In 1912, the first the university's first Student Council was appointed. In 1944, after a period of disinterest, the "Student Council" was recreated. In 1948, the Student Council was renamed the "Student Senate," and in 1967 it was renamed the "Student Government." Around 1974–75, the Student Government was given the name it held until 2018, the "Indiana University Student Association." The name was once again changed to "Indiana University Student Government" to allow students to better understand what the organization.

== Components ==
The IUSG executive branch will have all powers necessary and proper to fulfill their duties and the mandates of the IUSG Congress.

The IUSG Legislative Branch consists of the IUSG Congress. The Congress has sixty-two seats, with half of the seats reserved for Academic Representatives drawn from each degree granting unit of IU and the other half reserved for Residential Senators drawn from each of the residence halls, off-campus students, the Greek community, and Family Student Housing.

The Student Body Supreme Court is the judicial branch of IUSG and is composed of one chief justice and ten associate justices. Pursuant to Article IV, Section II of the IUSG Constitution "the judicial authority of IUSG will include the power of judicial review, adjudicating elections disputes, certifying elections results, and fulfilling the requirements of the University judicial process."

Under the judicial branch, the IUSG Election Commission officiates the IUSG elections each spring. Its contemporary formation began in 2014 and consists of nine commissioners and a head chair. According to the Election Code, the Commission's responsibilities include organizing and publicizing all IUSG elections, arbitrating ticket disputes, monitoring campaign finance, and enforcing the election code.

The IUSG Funding Board provides support to student groups by helping them obtain necessary funding in order to enhance their respective organizations. Funding Board offers monetary assistance by helping to fund specific initiatives and events through the Student Organization Fund.
