= Indiana University Bloomington =

Public research university in Bloomington, Indiana, U.S.

- Latin: Indianensis Universitas
- Former names: State Seminary (1820–1829); Indiana College (1829–1838); Indiana University (1838)
- Motto: Lux et Veritas (Latin)
- Motto in English: "Light and Truth"
- Type: Public research university
- Established: January 20, 1820; 206 years ago
- Parent institution: Indiana University
- Accreditation: HLC
- Academic affiliations: AAU; ORAU; URA; space-grant
- Endowment: $4.05 billion (2025) (system-wide)
- Chancellor: David Reingold
- President: Pamela Whitten (system)
- Provost: Rahul Shrivastav
- Faculty: 2,149 (2014)
- Students: 48,424 (fall 2024)
- Undergraduates: 36,833 (fall 2023)
- Postgraduates: 10,694 (fall 2023)
- Location: Bloomington, Indiana, United States; 39.167222°N 86.521389°W
- Campus: 1,937 acres (7.84 km^{2}); Small city
- Newspaper: Indiana Daily Student
- Colors: Cream and crimson
- Nickname: Hoosiers
- Sporting affiliations: NCAA Division I FBS – Big Ten; MPSF
- Mascot: Hoosier the Bison
- Website: bloomington.iu.edu

Indiana University Bloomington (IU Bloomington, Indiana University, IU, IUB, or Indiana) is a public research university in Bloomington, Indiana, United States. It is the flagship campus of Indiana University and is its largest campus, with over 48,000 students. Established as the state's seminary in 1820, the name was changed to "Indiana College" in 1829 and to "Indiana University" in 1838.

Indiana University is a member of the Association of American Universities and is classified among "R1: Doctoral Universities – Very high research spending and doctorate production". Its schools and programs include the Jacobs School of Music, Kelley School of Business, School of Education, Luddy School of Informatics, O'Neill School of Public and Environmental Affairs, School of Public Health, School of Medicine, School of Nursing, Hutton Honors College, Media School, and Maurer School of Law. The campus also features the Lilly Library, Eskenazi Museum of Art, and Indiana Memorial Union.

Indiana athletic teams compete in NCAA Division I and are known as the Indiana Hoosiers. The university is a member of the Big Ten Conference. All teams are known simply as the "Hoosiers", and the Bison mascot, also called "Hoosier", was reintroduced for the 2025 season. The Indiana Hoosiers have won 24 NCAA national championships and one Association for Intercollegiate Athletics for Women (AIAW) national championship, in addition to 145 NCAA individual national championships. Titles won by teams include eight by the Hoosiers men's soccer team, a record-setting six straight in men's swimming and diving, five by the Hoosiers men's basketball team, three in men's cross country, one in men's track and field, one in wrestling, and one in football.

== History ==
=== Early years ===
Indiana's state government in Corydon established Indiana University on January 20, 1820, as the "State Seminary". Construction began in 1822 at what is now called Seminary Square Park near the intersection of Second Street and College Avenue. Classes began on April 4, 1825. The first professor was Baynard Rush Hall, a Presbyterian minister who taught all of the classes in 1825–1827. In the first year, he taught twelve students and was paid $250. Hall was a classicist who focused on Greek and Latin and believed that the study of classical philosophy and languages formed the basis of the best education. The first class graduated in 1830. From 1820 to 1889 a legal-political battle was fought between IU and Vincennes University as to which was the legitimate state university.

In 1829, Andrew Wylie became the first president, serving until his death in 1851. The school's name was changed to "Indiana College" in 1829, and to "Indiana University" in 1838. Wylie and David Maxwell, president of the board of trustees, were devout Presbyterians. They spoke of the nonsectarian status of the school but generally hired fellow Presbyterians. Presidents and professors were expected to set a moral example for their charges. After six ministers in a row, the first non-clergyman to become president was the young biology professor David Starr Jordan, in 1885. Jordan followed Baptist theologian Lemuel Moss, who resigned after a scandal broke regarding his involvement with a female professor.

Jordan (president 1884–1891) improved the university's finances and public image, doubled its enrollment, and instituted an elective system along the lines of his alma mater, Cornell University. Jordan became president of Stanford University in June 1891.

The growth of the institution was slow. In 1851, IU had nearly a hundred students and seven professors. IU admitted its first woman student, Sarah Parke Morrison, in 1867, making IU the fourth public university to admit women on an equal basis with men. Morrison went on to become the first female professor at IU in 1873.

Mathematician Joseph Swain was IU's first Hoosier-born president, 1893 to 1902. He established Kirkwood Hall in 1894; a gymnasium for men in 1896, which later was named Assembly Hall; and Kirkwood Observatory in 1900. He began construction for Science Hall in 1901. During his presidency, student enrollment increased from 524 to 1,285.

In 1883, IU awarded its first PhD and played its first intercollegiate sport (baseball), prefiguring the school's future status as a major research institution and a power in collegiate athletics. But another incident that year was of more immediate concern: the original campus in Seminary Square burned to the ground. The college was rebuilt between 1884 and 1908 at the far eastern edge of Bloomington. (Today, the city has expanded eastward, and the "new" campus is once again in the midst of the city.) One challenge was that Bloomington's limited water supply was inadequate for its population of 12,000 and could not handle university expansion. The university commissioned a study that led to building a reservoir for its use.

=== 20th century ===
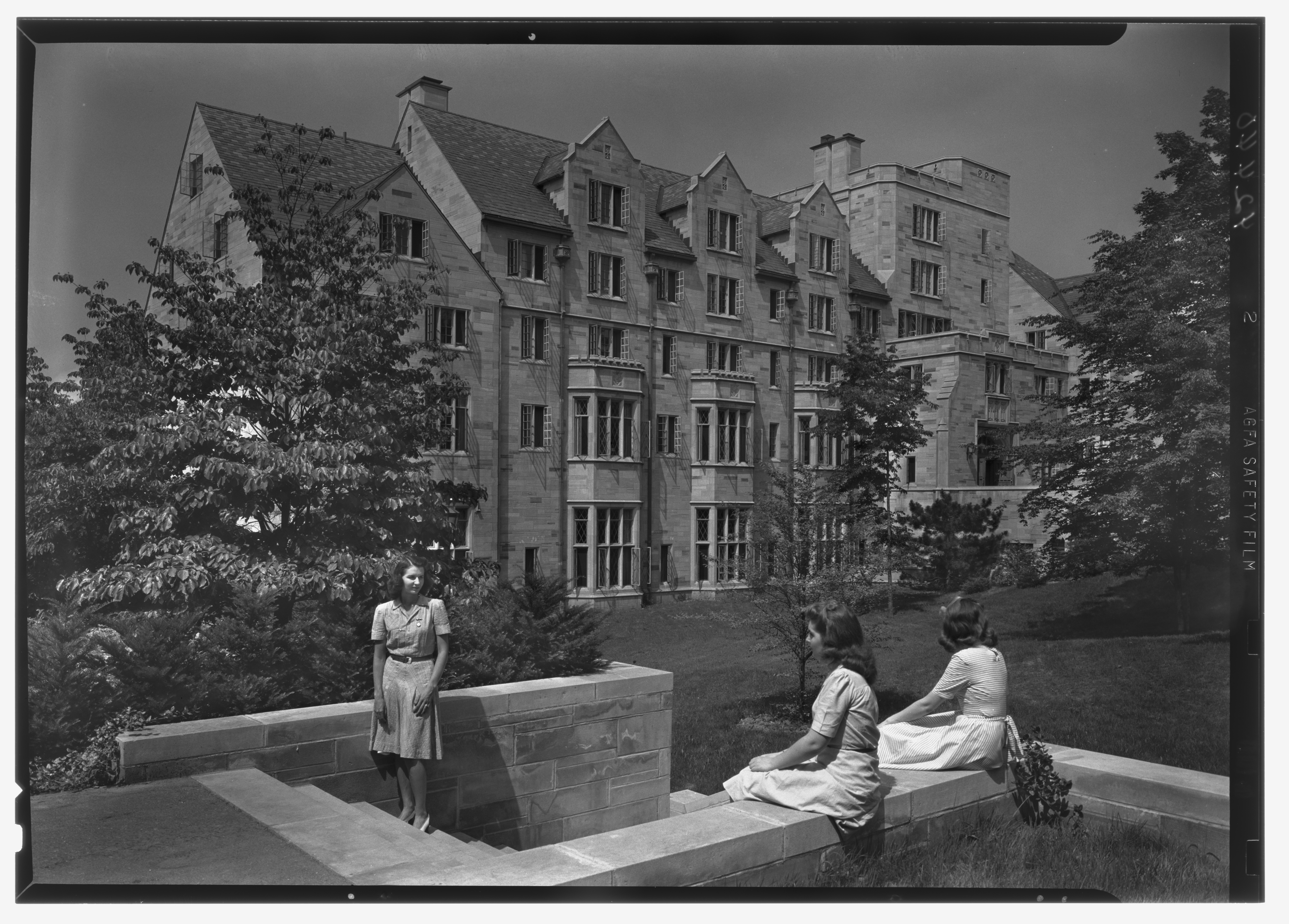
Morrison Hall in June 1942

In 1902, IU enrolled 1203 undergraduates; all but 65 were Hoosiers. There were 82 graduate students including ten from out-of-state. The curriculum emphasized the classics, as befitted a gentleman, and stood in contrast to the service-oriented curriculum at Purdue University, which presented itself as of direct benefit to farmers, industrialists, and businessmen.

The first extension office of IU was opened in Indianapolis in 1916. In 1920/1921 the School of Music and the School of Commerce and Finance (what later became the Kelley School of Business) were opened. In the 1940s Indiana University opened extension campuses in Kokomo and Fort Wayne. The Kinsey Institute for sexual research was established in 1945.

During the Great Depression, Indiana University fared much better than most state schools thanks to the entrepreneurship of its young president Herman Wells. He collaborated with Frederick L. Hovde, the president of Purdue; together they approached the Indiana delegation to Congress, indicating their highest priorities. For Wells, it was to build a world-class music school, replacing dilapidated facilities. As a result of these efforts, the Works Progress Administration (WPA) built one of the finest facilities in the country. He added matching funds from the state legislature and opened a full-scale fund-raising campaign among alumni and the business community. In 1942, Wells reported that "The past five years have been the greatest single period of expansion in the physical plant of the University in its entire history. In this period 15 new buildings have been constructed."

In 1960, the IU student body elected Thomas Atkins, an African-American from Elkhart, Indiana, to the position of president of the student body. A throng of white students protested the result by parading around campus waving Confederate flags and allegedly blamed Atkins' victory on a "bunch of beatniks". When the protesters approached the female dormitory on campus, they were met with "a barrage of cosmetic bottles, old shoes, and other objects".

In 1991, Reva Williams became the first African-American woman in the country to earn a Ph.D. in theoretical astrophysics.

=== 21st century ===
In March 2014, the U.S. Department of Education's Office for Civil Rights initiated a federal investigation of Indiana University's Title IX compliance, encompassing more than 450 sexual harassment and violence complaints filed with the university between 2011 and 2015. The complaints involved both students and university staff or faculty. The investigation revealed concerns with timeliness of response, lack of documentation, not preventing retaliation, and the creation of sexually hostile environments at the campus. The investigation further criticized the lack of mandatory sexual harassment, misconduct, and awareness training for staff, as well as the lack of institutional support for its Title IX Coordinator to oversee compliance by the university.

In February 2016, the university's Associate Dean of Students, Director of Student Ethics, and Title IX Deputy Director, Jason Casares, abruptly resigned his position after sexual assault allegations were made against him by Association for Student Conduct Administration president-elect, and New York University Assistant Director of Global Community Standards, Jill Creighton, during a conference in Fort Worth, Texas in December 2015. The Fort Worth Police Department declined to press charges.

In May 2016, the U.S. Department of Education's Office for Civil Rights initiated another Title IX investigation into Indiana University for failing to hold a university student accountable for an off-campus rape of another student and failing to follow proper Title IX procedures subsequent to the reporting of the incident. The university also charged the victim a dorm-relocation fee after the suspected rapist continued to harass the victim around her dormitory, which also went without intervention by the university. The victim's case was also handled by former Title IX Director Jason Casares, prior to his resignation amid sexual harassment and misconduct allegations as the university's student ethics director and Title IX deputy director.

In November 2023, Indiana University Student Government treasurer Alex Kaswan and co-director of DEI Makiah Pickett resigned after accusing other student government leadership members of antisemitism and failure to represent the cultural whole of the student body. After learning of the accusations and resignations, U.S. Representative Jim Banks sent a letter to university president Pamela Whitten denouncing such conduct, identifying it as a violation of the 1964 Civil Rights Act and threatened the continued federal funding for the university if the conduct was tolerated by the university administration. Accused student body president Aaliyah Raji responded by denouncing both Islamophobia and antisemitism and stating that the student government combats against those issues.

Also in November 2023, the university attracted national attention when the university barred a faculty member from teaching after alleging that he improperly assisted the Palestine Solidarity Committee, a student group, in reserving a space on campus. Shortly thereafter, the university's administrators also cancelled a planned art exhibition by Samia Halaby, a Palestinian-American artist. Both of these events occurred after the October 7, 2023, Hamas-led attack on Israel and in the wake of national attention on antisemitism on college and university campuses. They also occurred in the midst of changes to Indiana laws that some perceived as attacking academic freedom. In the spring of 2024, the university's faculty voted no confidence in the Indiana University system president, the Bloomington campus's provost and executive vice president, and the Bloomington campus's vice provost for faculty and academic affairs.

In February 2024, the U.S. Department of Education's Office for Civil Rights again initiated a federal investigation of the university in response to a complaint of the violation of Title VI of the 1964 Civil Rights Act. The complaint was filed by Dr. Zachary Marschall and alleged lack of response and complacency by the university administration to an increasing number of anti-Semitic incidents at the campus. The complaint also led to additional federal investigations at the University of Wisconsin, Northwestern University, and the office is also conducting parallel investigations of Johns Hopkins University, Harvard University, the University of Michigan, and others.

==== Degree cuts (2025) ====
In 2025, the Indiana General Assembly passed a state budget bill mandating that Indiana's public universities phase out programs that produce fewer than 10 students in an associate degree program, 15 students in a bachelor's degree program, 7 students in a master's degree program, and 3 students in a doctorate degree program, unless the institution received permission from the Indiana Commission for Higher Education to continue offering the program. As a result, the university ended over a hundred programs, including:

- Bachelor's degree: Art History, American Studies, Atmospheric Science, Comparative Literature, Dance, Earth Science, Geography, East Asian Studies, Gender Studies, German Studies, Music/Ballet, Religious Studies, Statistics, and numerous foreign languages
- Master's degree: African Studies, Comparative Literature, Communications and Culture, Journalism, Latin American Studies, Statistics, Theatre and Drama, and numerous foreign languages
- PhD: African Diaspora Studies, American Studies, Art History, Astrophysics, Chemical Physics, Classical Studies, Comparative Literature, Gender Studies, Public Policy, Theatre and Drama, and numerous foreign languages

Significant cuts were made to the university's programs in foreign languages, due to their low enrollment numbers. This occurred even though many of these programs were privately funded, such as the program in Mongolian studies. In response, students and faculty have launched a petition calling for the restoration of language programs.

==== Student newspaper free speech controversy (2025) ====
In October 2025, the university came under fire when administrators instructed the Indiana Daily Student to refrain from printing news stories in its homecoming edition, leading student media director Jim Rodenbush to refuse what he described as censorship. The university terminated Rodenbush and announced the discontinuation of all print editions of the IDS, citing financial and strategic considerations, a justification contested by student editors and press-freedom advocates. Rodenbush subsequently filed a federal lawsuit alleging First Amendment retaliation. The university later permitted limited print publication through June 2026, while maintaining it had not intended to censor content.

== Campus ==
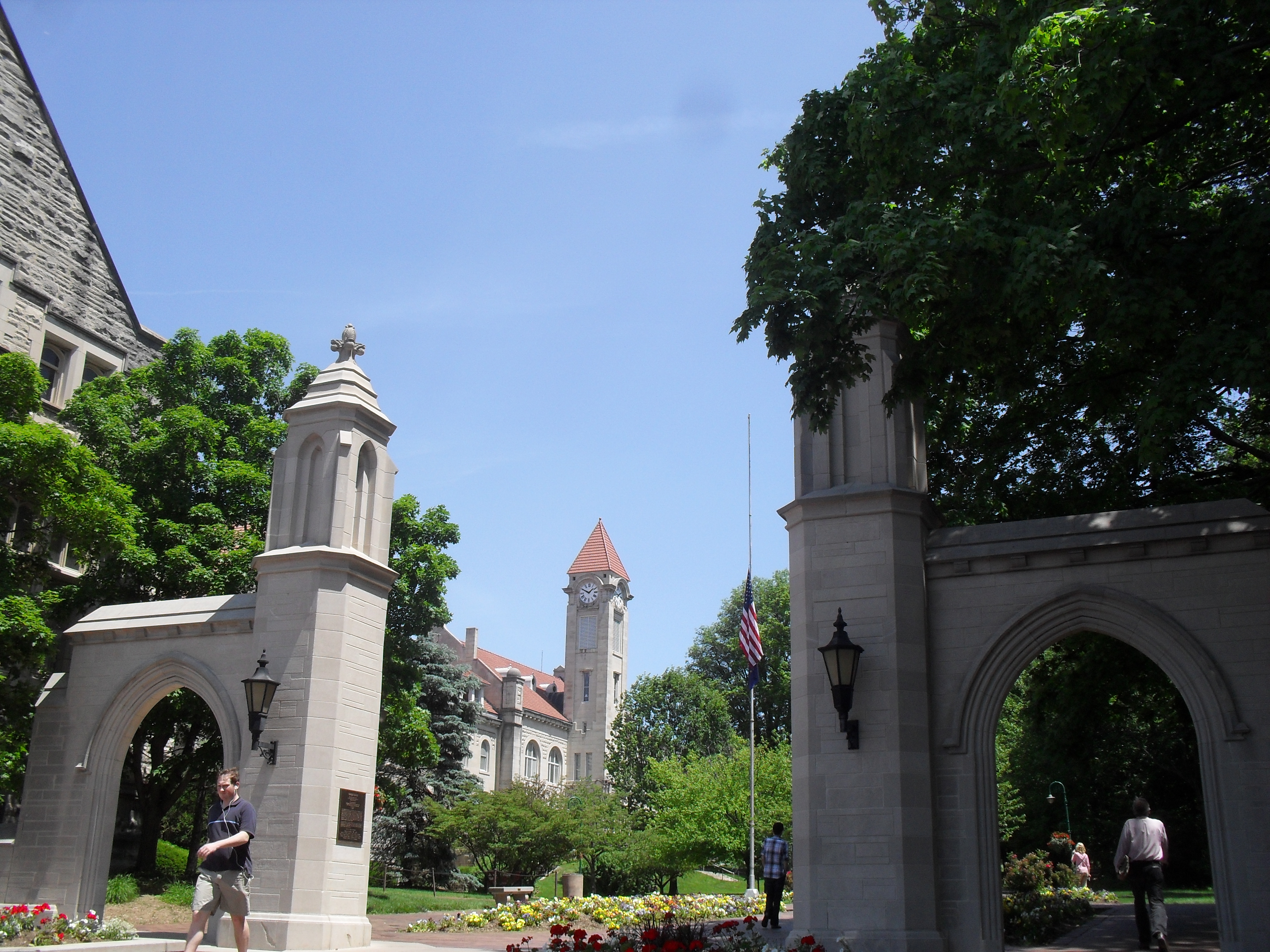
The Sample Gates mark the main entrance to the Indiana University Bloomington campus

The Indiana University Bloomington campus of 1,933 acres (7.82 km^{2}) rests on a bed of Indiana Limestone, specifically Salem Limestone and Harrodsburg Limestone, with outcroppings of St. Louis Limestone.

The "Campus River" is a stream flowing through the center of campus. A section of Bloomington's Clear Creek, it was formerly named the "Jordan River" after IU president David Starr Jordan. The name was changed, along with those of several campus buildings, in 2020 by the IU trustees due to Jordan's support of eugenics becoming widely known.

Bloomington was ranked the fifth-best city for educated millennials by Business Insider. College Ranker listed Bloomington as the #6 Best College Town to Live in Forever.

=== Architecture ===
- The Old Crescent
- U.S. National Register of Historic Places
- U.S. Historic district
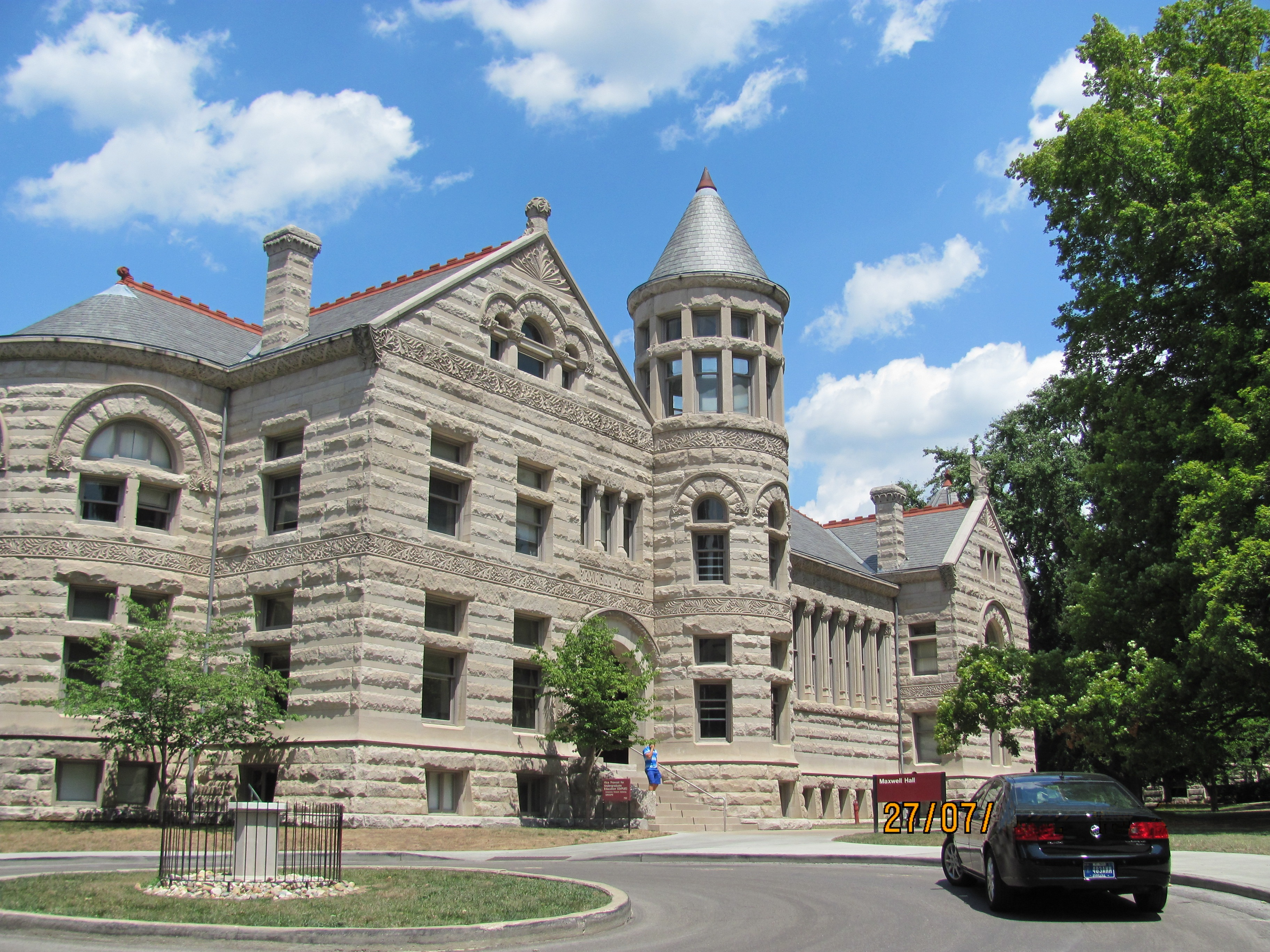
- Maxwell Hall
- Location: Indiana University Campus, Bloomington, Indiana
- Area: 20 acres (8.1 ha)
- Built: 1884
- Architect: Multiple
- Architectural style: Late Victorian, Gothic, Romanesque
- NRHP reference No.: 80000028
- Added to NRHP: September 8, 1980

The Works Progress Administration built much of the campus's core during the Great Depression. Many of the campus's buildings were built and most of its land acquired during the 1950s and 1960s when first soldiers attending under the GI Bill and then the baby boom swelled the university's enrollment from 5,403 in 1940 to 30,368 in 1970. Some buildings on campus underwent similar expansion. As additions were constructed by building onto the outside of existing buildings, exterior surfaces were incorporated into their new interiors, making this expansion visible in the affected buildings' architecture. The Chemistry and Biology buildings serve as examples, where two of the interior walls of the latter's library were clearly constructed as limestone exteriors. The Bryan House is the traditional on-campus home of the university president.

Nine of the oldest buildings are included in a national historic district known as the Old Crescent. It was listed on the National Register of Historic Places in 1980. They are the Collegiate Gothic-style Student Service Building (1906–1908), Indiana University Museum (1905), Richardsonian Romanesque-style Maxwell Building (1890, 1907–1908), Owen Hall (1885), Wylie Hall (1885), Kirkwood Hall (1895), Lindley Hall (1903), Gothic Revival-style Rose Well House (1908), and Kirkwood Observatory (1900).

The Sample Gates serve as the entryway to Indiana University's campus and the Old Crescent. It is positioned between Franklin Hall and Bryan Hall. After several failed attempts to create an arched entrance to campus, in 1987, Edson Sample provided funding to build the archway based on the 1961 design proposed by Eggers & Higgins.

The Indiana University Cinema opened in January 2011 in the former University Theatre building, which was built in the 1930s.

The Bloomington campus also has a biology research greenhouse in the Biology Building that is open to the public, one of the highlights of which is a corpse flower (Amorphophallus titanum) named Wally. Also on campus, the Kirkwood Observatory is open to the public one day a week.

The Mies Building for the Eskenazi School of Art, Architecture + Design opened in 2022. Its design is based on an unbuilt plan for a fraternity house by Ludwig Mies van der Rohe.

The 1979 movie Breaking Away was filmed on location in Bloomington and the IU campus. It also featured a reenactment of the annual Little 500 bicycle race. The IU campus also has trails that many utilize for biking and running. The trails in Bloomington and nearby areas total nearly 1,200 miles (1,900 km).

=== Indiana Memorial Union ===
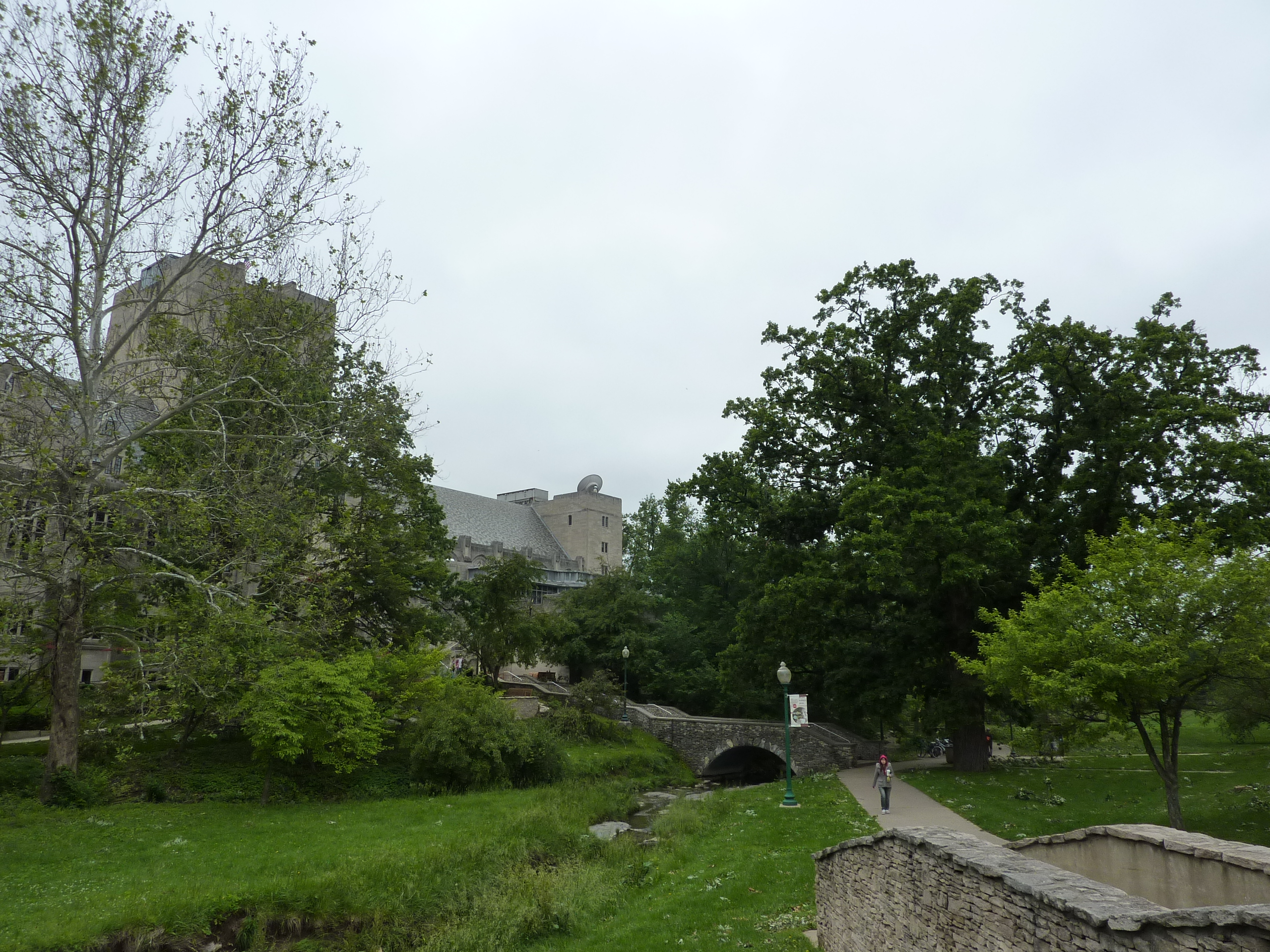
The Campus River crosses the Dunn Meadow in front of the Indiana Memorial Union.

The over 500,000-square-foot (46,000 m^{2}) Indiana Memorial Union (IMU) is one of the largest student unions in the world. Construction began in 1931, and the building was completed and dedicated in 1932. The IMU houses offices and facilities for student organizations and is governed by the Indiana Memorial Union Board. It also contains a collection of art and artifacts, much of which was acquired under IU president Herman B Wells. The collection has also received contributions from students, alumni, and other donors.

The Biddle Hotel and Conference Center was added in 1960. The wing contains 189 guest rooms and over 50,000 square feet of meeting space. The IMU hosts more than 17,000 events every year.

=== Indiana University Auditorium ===
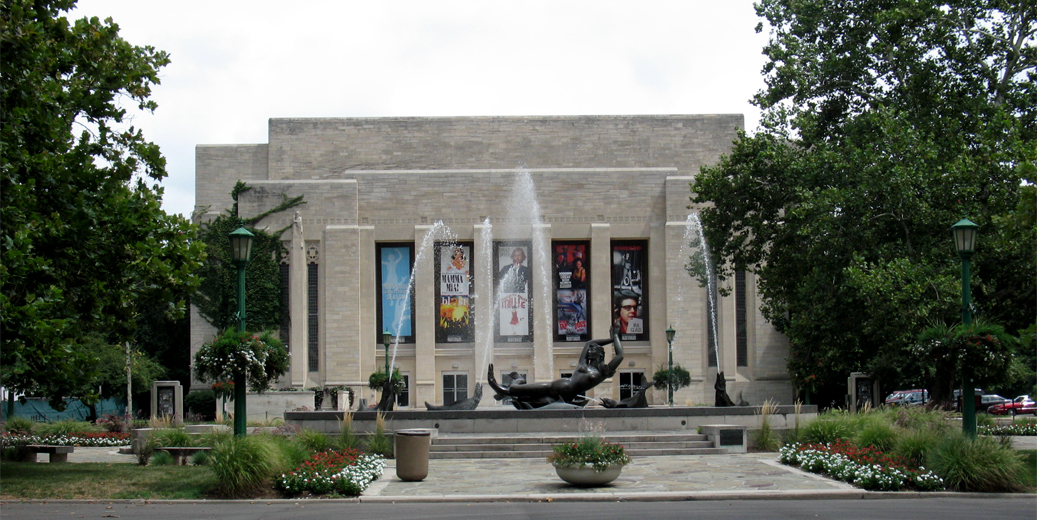
Indiana University Auditorium

Indiana University Auditorium is a 3,200 seat performing arts venue situated in IU's Fine Arts Plaza alongside the Lilly Library and the Eskenazi School of Art, Architecture + Design.

Construction on IU Auditorium began in 1939 as a part of the Federal Works Agency Projects. IU Auditorium officially opened its doors March 22, 1941.

Today, IU Auditorium presents Broadway touring acts, popular musical artists, comedians, classical musicians and more. IU Auditorium's Hall of Murals is the home of the Indiana Murals, created by artist Thomas Hart Benton. 16 of the 22 total panels created are housed at the auditorium.

=== Museums ===
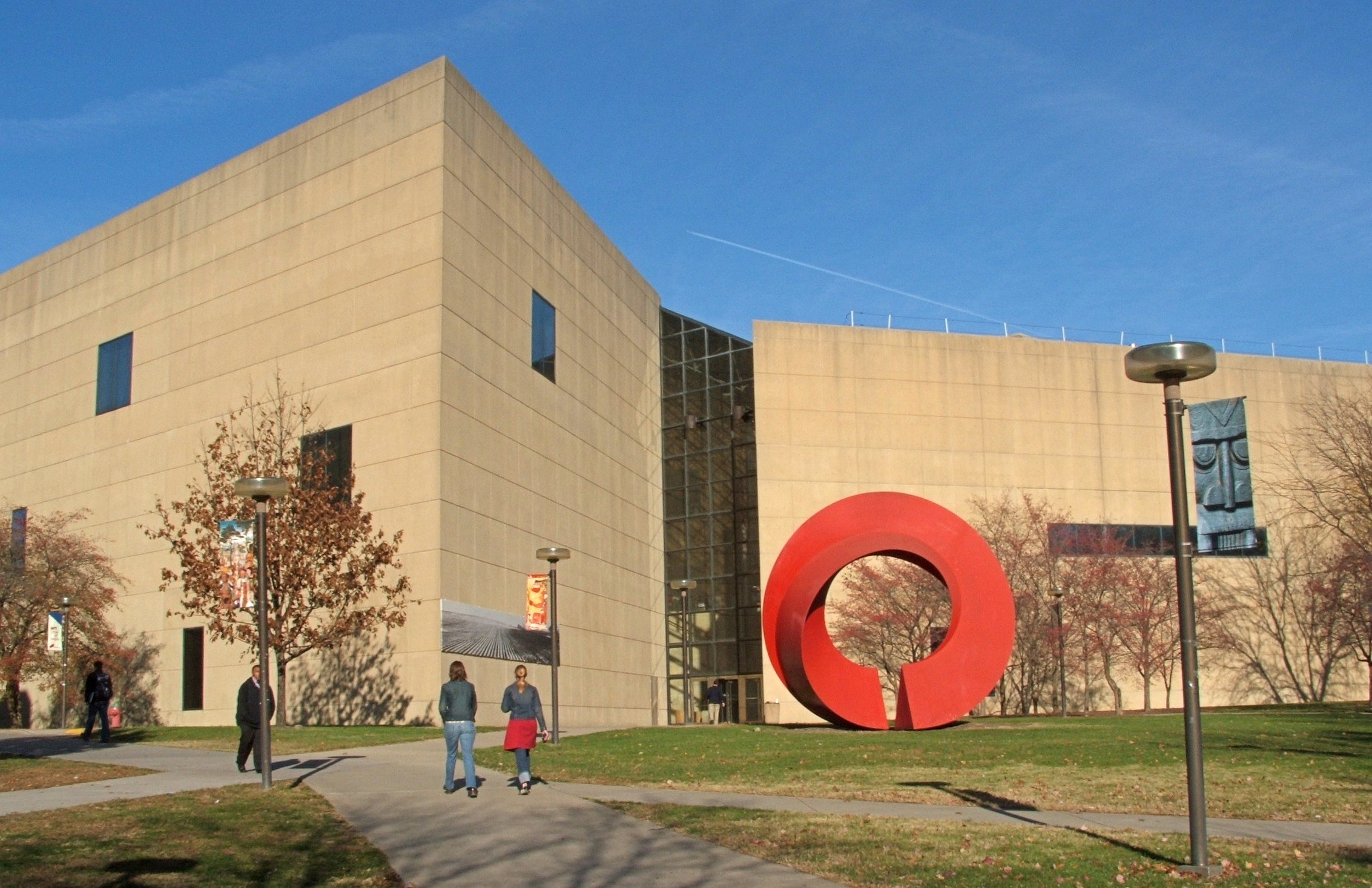
Eskenazi Museum of Art

The Eskenazi Museum of Art, formerly known as the Indiana University Art Museum, was established in 1941 and has occupied a building designed by architecture firm I.M. Pei and Partners since 1982. The museum houses a collection of over 40,000 objects and includes works by Claude Monet, Marcel Duchamp, Pablo Picasso, Henri Matisse, and Jackson Pollock. It also holds a substantial collection of works on paper.

The IU Museum of Archaeology and Anthropology consists of an estimated 5 million archaeological artifacts, 30,000 ethnographic objects, 20,000 photographs, and a supporting library and archive. The collections represent cultures from each of the world's inhabited continents. These materials have been collected and curated to serve the museum's primary mission as a teaching museum within a university setting. The ethnology collections include traditional musical instruments, photographs of Native Americans and the Bloomington community, Iñupiat and Yupik materials, and Pawnee material culture. The archaeology collections piece together the material remains of cultures from the earliest occupations of North America through to the modern period.

The Grunwald Gallery of Art, a contemporary art museum hosted by the university. The gallery was established in 1983 as the School of Fina Arts Gallery (SoFA Gallery), in what was formerly the university's art museum space, when that museum relocated to a new building. The museum exhibits experimental works by emerging and established artists as well as works by faculty and students within the Department of Studio Art. It is located at 1201 East 7th Street. It was named in honor of Indiana University alumnus John A. Grunwald in 2011. He was born in Hungary in 1935, survived the Holocaust, emigrated to the United States in 1950, and graduated with a degree in economics in 1956 from Indiana University where he met his wife Rita. In 2017, the museum hosted an exhibition on the history of the tattoo artistry in Indiana.

=== Sustainability ===
IU Bloomington's Von Lee Theatre building is LEED Certified. The "More Art, Less Trash" recycling initiative included a design contest for recycling bin artwork and promotes both recycling and outdoor art. The university employs a group of student sustainability interns each summer, and students can get involved in campus and community-based sustainability initiatives through the Volunteers in Sustainability coordination group or the Student Sustainability Council. IU launched its Environmental Resiliency Institute in 2017 to enable more efficient collaboration between the university, local communities, and businesses on greenhouse gas reduction and sustainability projects. Cities that have participated in the program include Bloomington, Fort Wayne, Gary, West Lafayette, and Zionsville among others.

=== Transportation ===
A campus bus system operates several routes on a regular schedule around the IUB campus throughout the semesters. The campus buses are free to all IU affiliates and are handicap accessible. IU students and employees also gain free access to Bloomington transit buses around the city.

== Academics ==
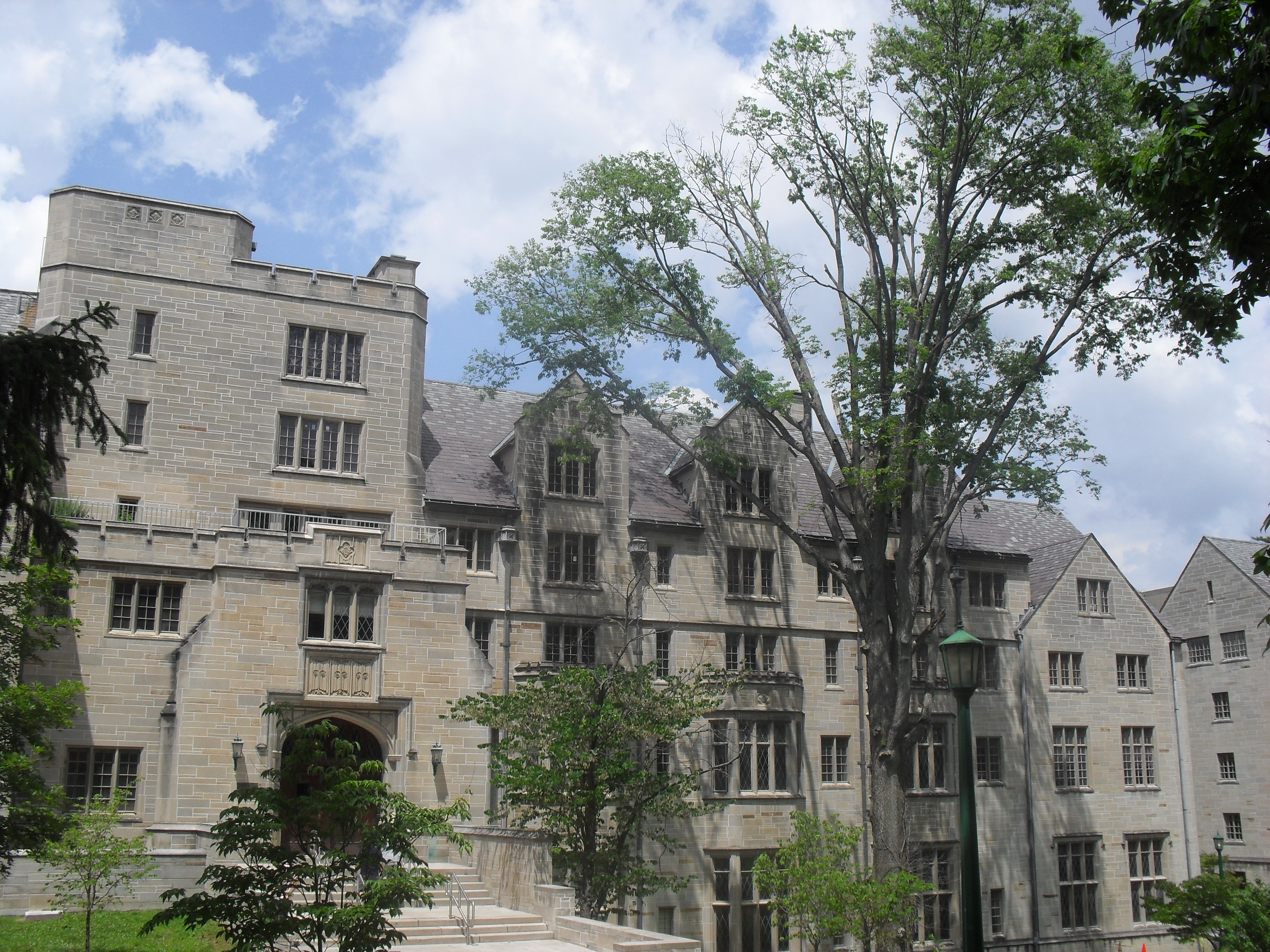
Morrison Hall

The Office of the Provost oversees the academic programs, research, and policies of 16 schools on the Indiana University Bloomington campus. Together, these units offer more than 550 individual degree programs and majors.

=== College of Arts and Sciences ===
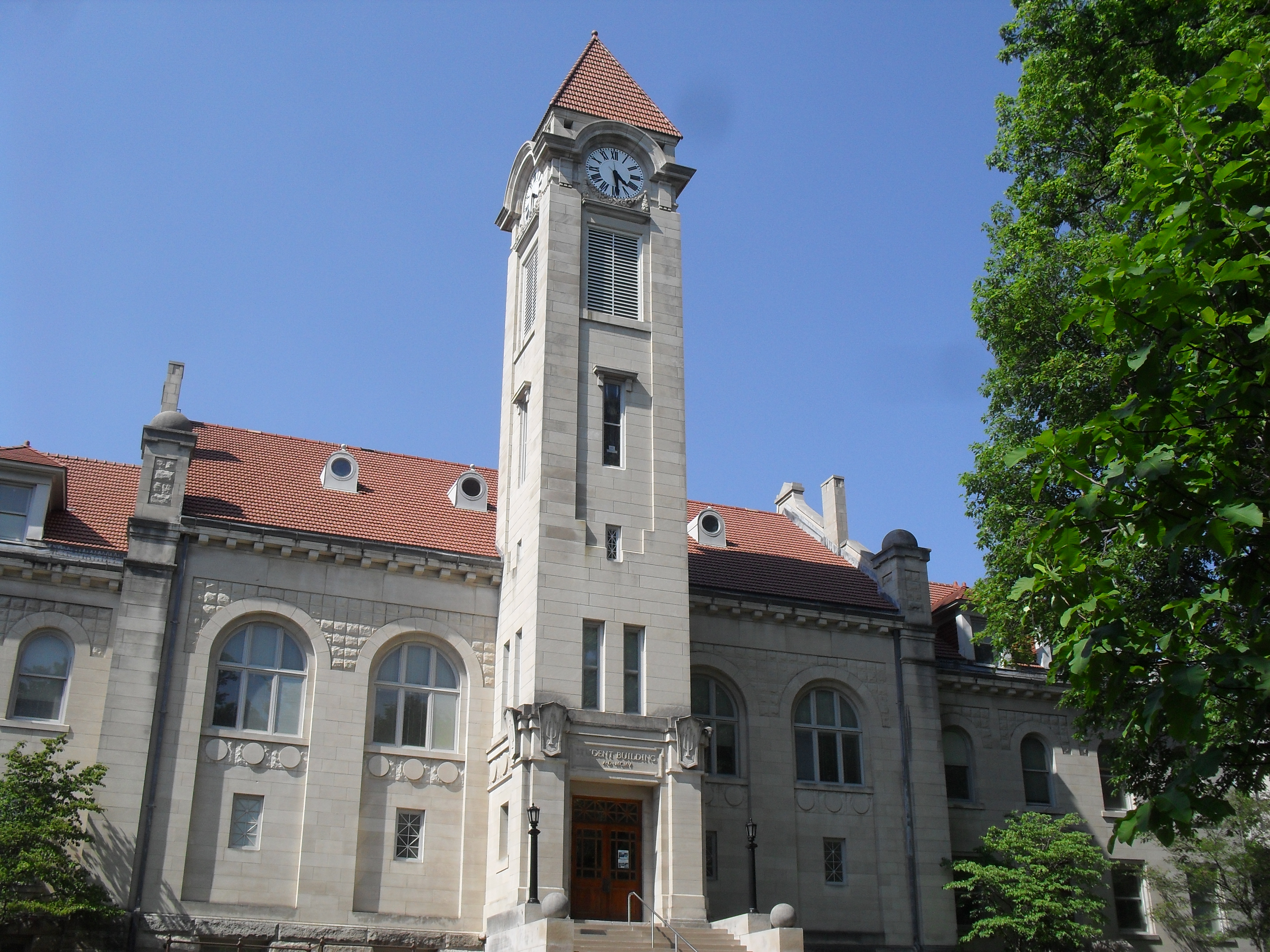
The Student Building, home of the departments of anthropology and geography

The College of Arts and Sciences at Indiana University is the largest academic division. It provides instruction in over 50 foreign languages, including unique programs like Hungarian and the first doctoral program in Gender Studies. The college is home to various renowned departments, research institutes, and autonomous schools, including the School of Art + Design and the Media School. It also features IU's Department of Folklore and Ethnomusicology, the nation's only degree-granting Department of Central Eurasian Studies, and a world-class cyclotron in physics. The Department of Political Science made history in 2009 when professor Elinor Ostrom became the first woman to win the Nobel Prize in Economics.

Within the College of Arts and Sciences, the Eskenazi School of Art, Architecture + Design houses fourteen different areas in art, architecture, design, and merchandising. The Hamilton Lugar School of Global and International Studies is an international affairs school composed of over 500 students from four academic departments and twenty-one institutes and centers. It also runs the Indiana University Summer Language Workshop.

=== The Media School ===
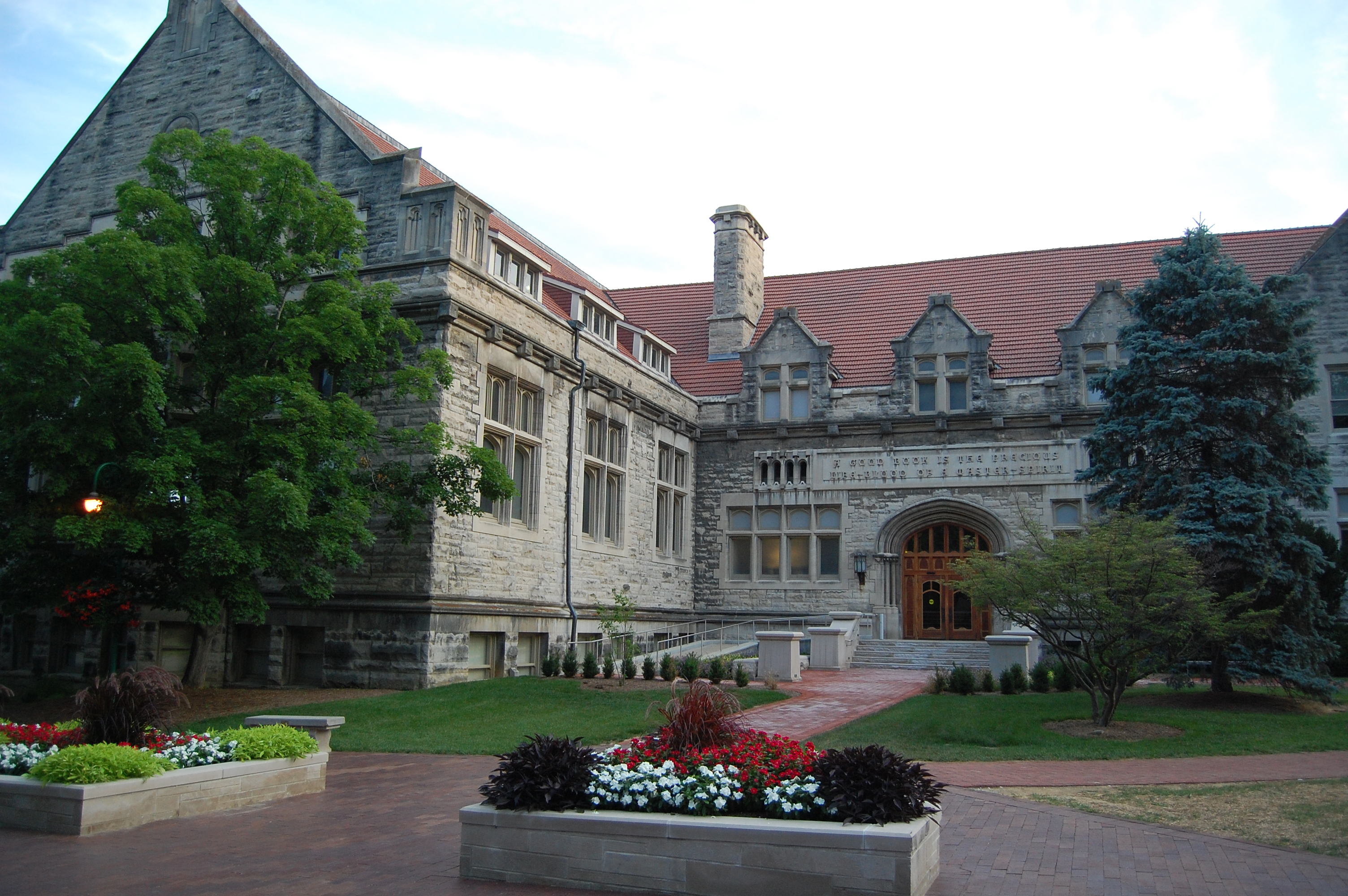
Franklin Hall, the Media School

The Media School was established on July 1, 2014, bringing together journalism, communications, and film studies programs under the College of Arts and Sciences. Led by Dean David Tolchinsky as of September 2023, the school offers undergraduate degrees in journalism, media, cinematic arts, and game design, along with graduate degrees in media and media arts and sciences. It also provides various minors and certificates. Located primarily in Franklin Hall with additional facilities in the Radio-Television Building, the school hosts the Michael I. Arnolt Center for Investigative Journalism, the Black Film Center & Archive, and the Center for Documentary Research and Practice. Student media include the Indiana Daily Student, the Student Cinema Guild, WIUX Pure Student Radio, IU Student Television, and the Public Relations Student Society of America.

=== Kelley School of Business ===
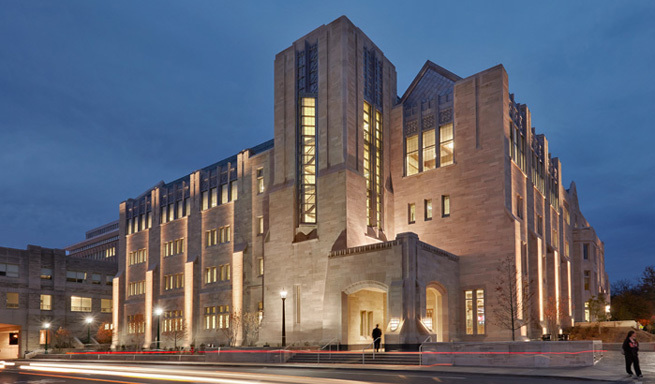
Hodge Hall, Kelley School of Business

The Kelley School of Business was founded in 1920 as the university's School of Commerce and Finance. Approximately 6,100 students are enrolled in undergraduate, graduate Accountancy and Information Systems degrees, MBA and PhD programs, and in its online degree program, "Kelley Direct". Kelley partners with the Scotts Miracle-Gro Company to offer Bloomington Brands, a unique work-study program for undergraduates and MBA students. Participating students obtain real-world brand management experience by managing the Osmocote Plant Food brand under contract to Scotts. Kelley also partners with Coca-Cola for a program called Global Business Institute that is available in the Middle East, North Africa, and Asia. This is a program that was designed to let select groups of students in participating countries learn about business from the context of American culture.

=== School of Education ===
The School of Education, formerly a part of the College of Arts and Science, has been independent since 1923. It offers a BS in teacher education leading to a teaching license, MS., education specialist (EdS), and doctoral (EdD, PhD) degrees.

=== Luddy School of Informatics, Computing, and Engineering ===
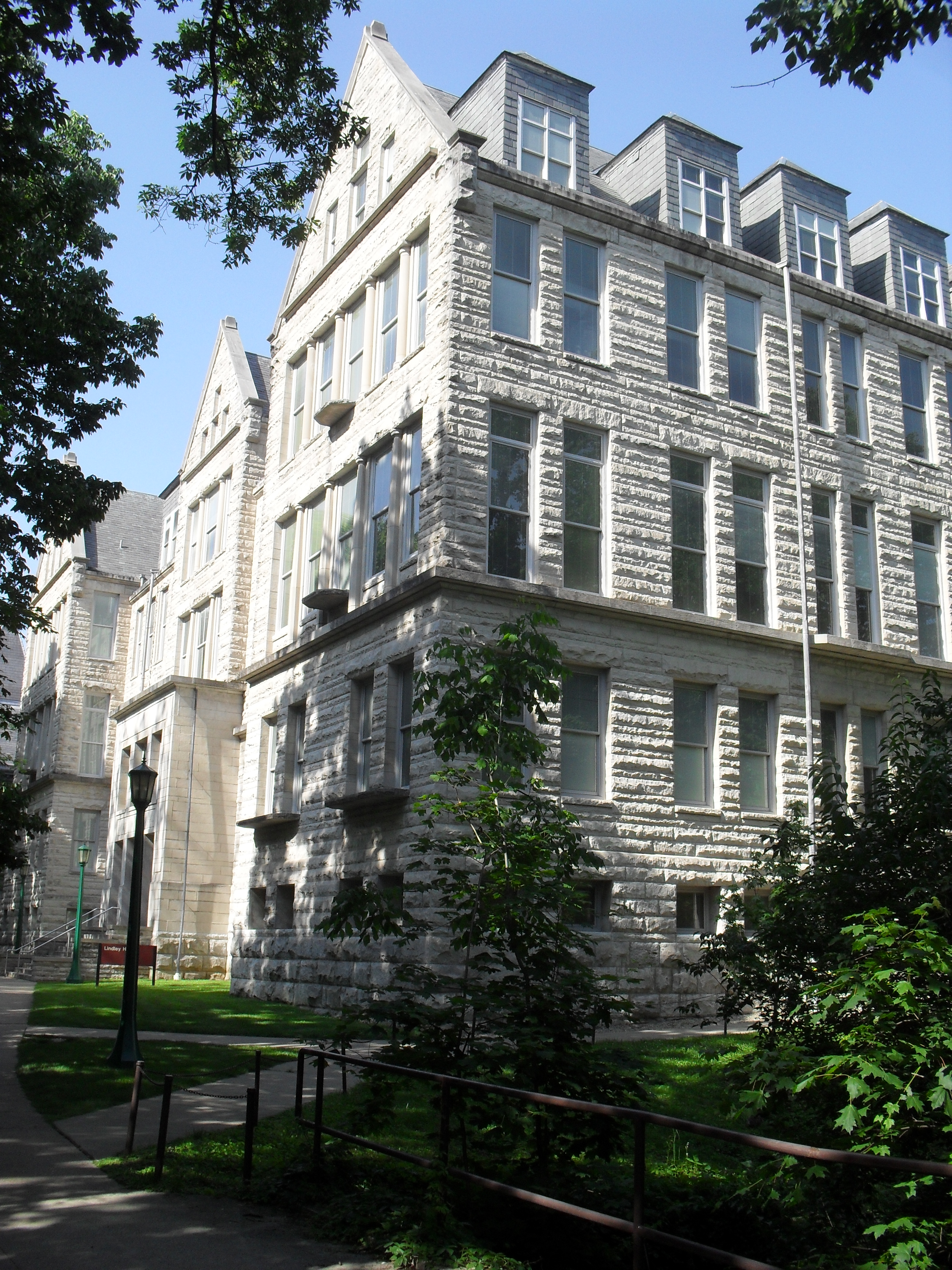
Lindley Hall, former home of the Department of Computer Science

The Indiana University School of Informatics was established in 1999 as the first of its kind in the U.S. In 2005, the Department of Computer Science moved into the school, prompting a name change to the "School of Informatics and Computing". In 2016, the school expanded further with the creation of the Department of Intelligent Systems Engineering, and was renamed to the "School of Informatics, Computing, and Engineering" (SICE). In 2013, it merged with the School of Library and Information Science, further expanding its academic reach. The school's new home, Luddy Hall, opened in 2018. The school is one of a handful that offers degrees in human–computer interaction. It also offers programs in various informatics fields, including bioinformatics, computer science, high-performance computing, and complex systems.

=== Maurer School of Law ===
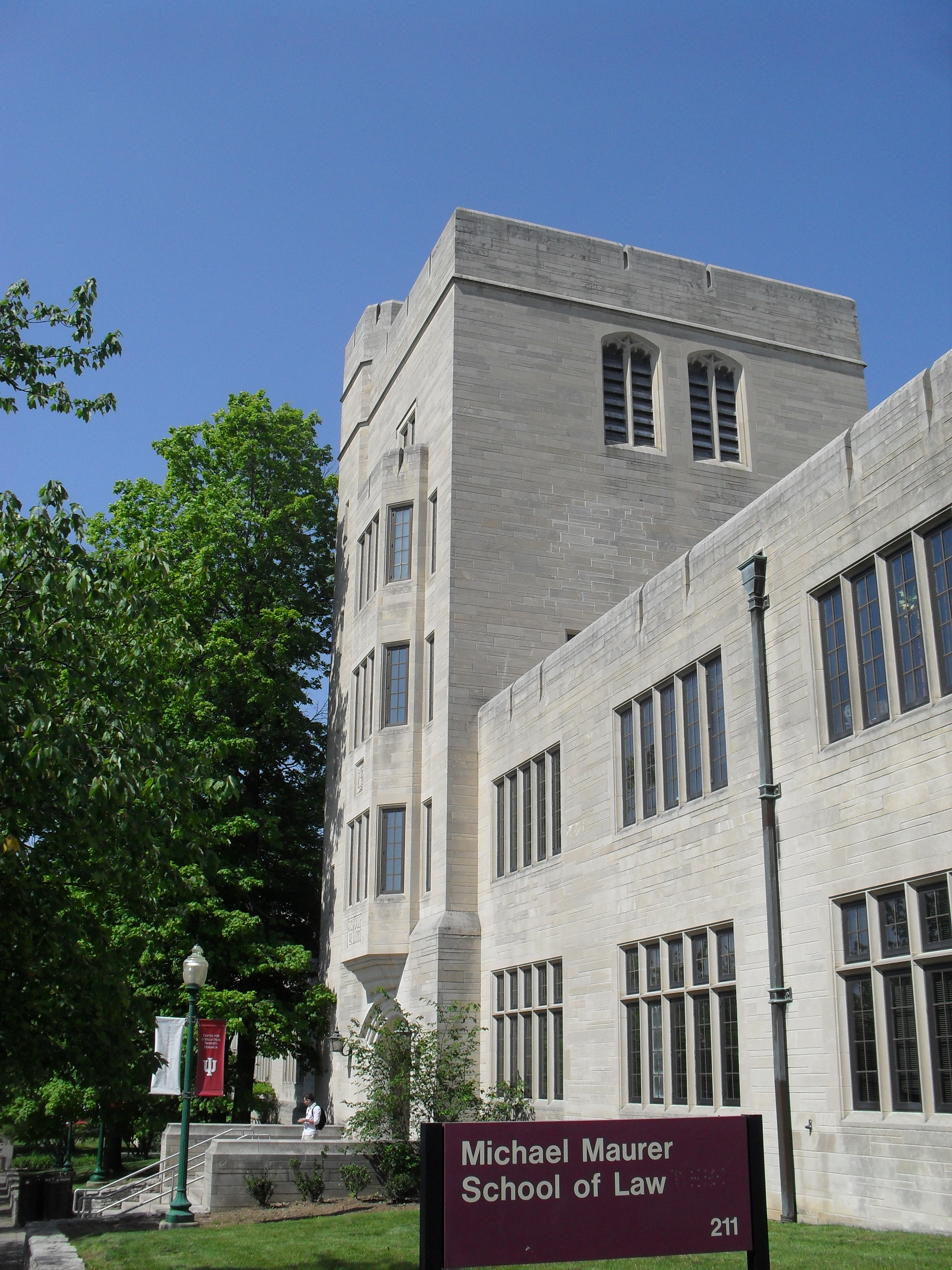
The main building of the Maurer School of Law

The Maurer School of Law, founded in 1842, is one of the oldest schools on the Bloomington campus. On December 4, 2008, the school of law was renamed the Michael Maurer School of Law. In 2000, then-Chief Justice William Rehnquist presided over a mock trial of King Henry VIII in the school's moot courtroom. Notable alumni of the School of Law include songwriter Hoagy Carmichael, and vice-chairman of the 9/11 Commission and former congressman Lee H. Hamilton.

=== School of Medicine–Bloomington ===
The Indiana University School of Medicine (IUSM) was founded in 1903 in Bloomington, initially offering only the first two years of medical education, with the remaining years completed at a separate school in Indianapolis. In 1908, the main campus moved to Indianapolis, and over time, Bloomington continued to host the first two years of medical education. The Bloomington medical science building was thus renamed as Myers Hall, in honor of medical school dean Burton D. Myers. A statewide medical school system was established in 1971, expanding IUSM's regional campuses. By 2014, all regional campuses offered full four-year programs. In 2021, IUSM-Bloomington moved into the new Health Sciences Building as part of the Regional Academic Health Center, alongside other health-related IU programs.

=== Jacobs School of Music ===
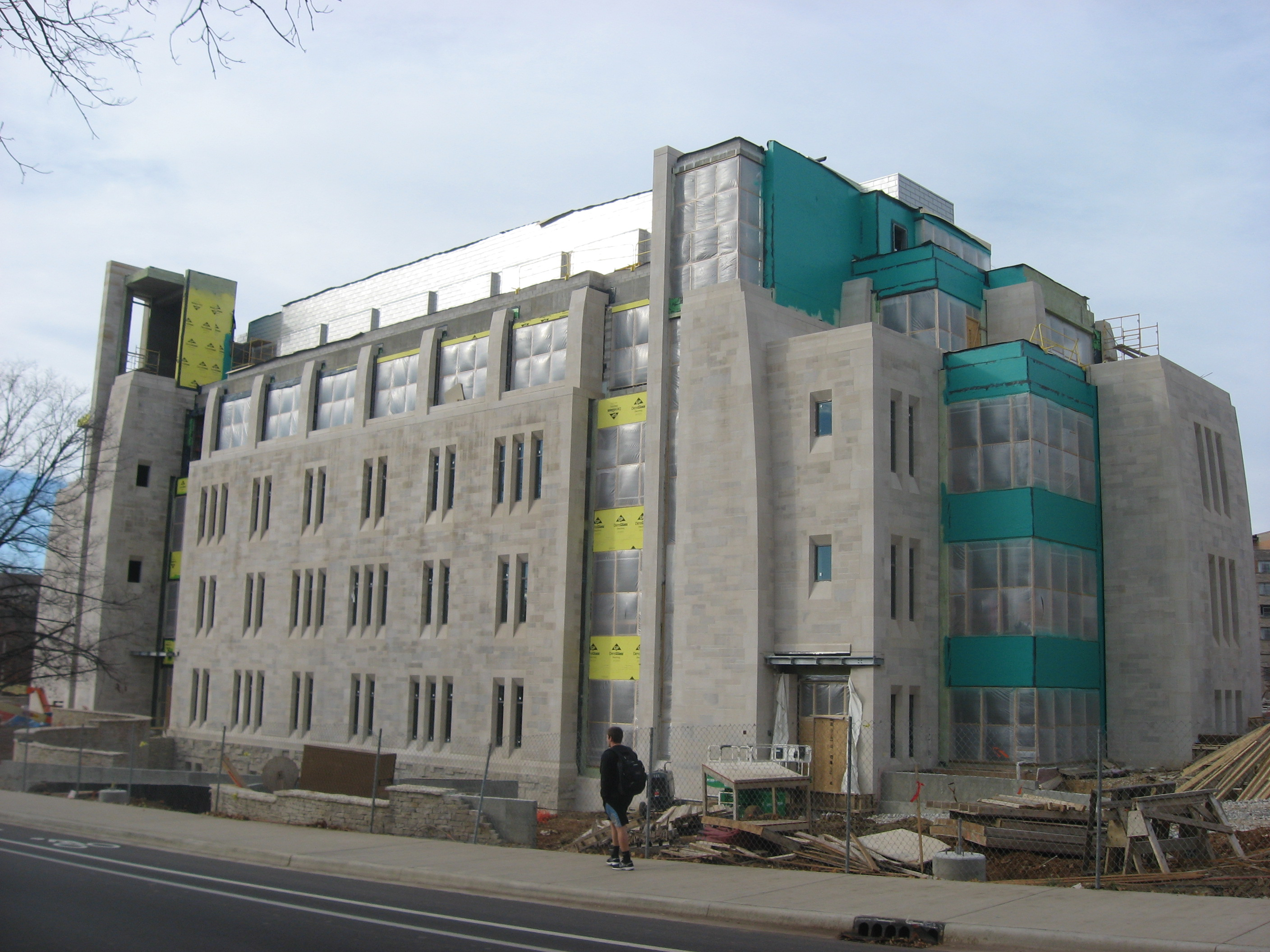
The Jacobs School of Music's newest building, The East Studio Building, under construction in 2012.

Founded at the beginning of the 20th century by Charles Campbell, the Jacobs School of Music focuses on voice, opera, orchestral conducting, and jazz studies. It has more than 1,600 students. The school's facilities, including five buildings in the heart of campus, comprise recital halls, more than 170 practice rooms, choral and instrumental rehearsal rooms, and more than 100 offices and studios. Its faculty has included such notable people as Eileen Farrell, David Effron, János Starker, André Watts, Menahem Pressler, Carol Ann Weaver, Abbey Simon, Jorge Bolet, Ray Cramer, David Baker, William Bell, Harvey Phillips, Carol Vaness, Sylvia McNair, Howard Klug, violinist Joshua Bell, conductor Leonard Slatkin, and composer Sven-David Sandström. Notable alumni include Edgar Meyer and soprano Angela Brown.

=== School of Nursing ===
The Indiana University Training School for Nurses was established in Indianapolis in 1914 in conjunction with the establishment of the Robert W. Long Hospital and in association with the IU School of Medicine to offer training leading to a nursing diploma. It was renamed the IU School of Nursing in 1956. In the 1930s a Division of Nursing Education under the IU School of Education was created on the Bloomington campus to offer additional training to nursing students seeking BS; an MS degree program was added in 1945. Today, the School of Nursing is located at several of the IU campuses, with Indianapolis and Bloomington being the main locations. As of 2017 its degree programs include a four-year Bachelor of Science in Nursing (BSN) degree, a Master of Science in Nursing (MSN) degree, and two doctoral degrees: Doctor of Nursing Practice (DNP) and Doctor of Philosophy in nursing (PhD).

The National League for Nursing has recognized the School as a Center of Excellence in two categories simultaneously for creating environments that: Promote the Pedagogical Expertise of Faculty and Creating Environments (effective 2006–22) and Advance the Science of Nursing Education (effective 2012–21).

=== School of Optometry ===
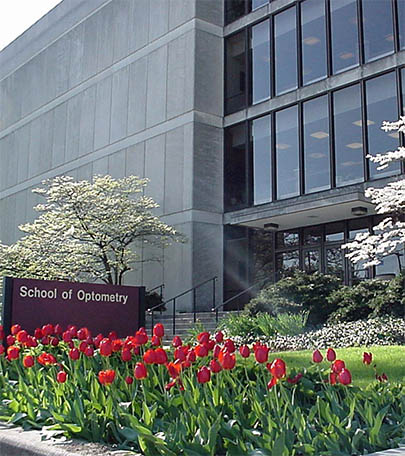
The main building of the School of Optometry

The Indiana University School of Optometry was founded in 1951. The school became a degree-granting institution of its own in 1975. Located at the southwest border of campus the Doctor of Optometry (OD) program admits on average 70–80 students per year.

The school operates a 22,000-square-foot (2,000 m^{2}) community eye care clinic in Bloomington and a clinic in Indianapolis. In addition to providing optometric education, the facility also houses the Borish Center for Ophthalmic Research, officially dedicated in October 1995. The Borish Center provides opportunities for undergraduate, professional, and graduate students to participate directly in vision research.

=== O'Neill School of Public and Environmental Affairs ===
The O'Neill School of Public and Environmental Affairs (or SPEA) is the largest school of its kind in the United States. Founded in 1972, SPEA is known for its distinctive interdisciplinary approach. It brings together the social, natural, behavioral, and administrative sciences in one faculty. SPEA has a sister "core" campus at Indiana University Indianapolis, and an affiliate program is operated at Indiana University's Gary campus.

SPEA is the headquarters of the Public Administration Review, the premier journal of public administration research, theory, and practice. SPEA is also home to the Journal of Policy Analysis and Management, the Journal of Public Budgeting and Finance, and Small Business Economics.

SPEA has more than a dozen joint programs in social and natural sciences and professional fields. Popular majors include nonprofit management and leadership, public policy, public finance, and arts administration. SPEA alumni include radio and television host Tavis Smiley and former U.S. Treasury Secretary Paul O'Neill. Among SPEA's faculty was Elinor Ostrom, the first woman to receive the Nobel Prize in Economics. She was named by Time magazine as one of the 100 most influential people in the United States.

=== School of Public Health-Bloomington ===
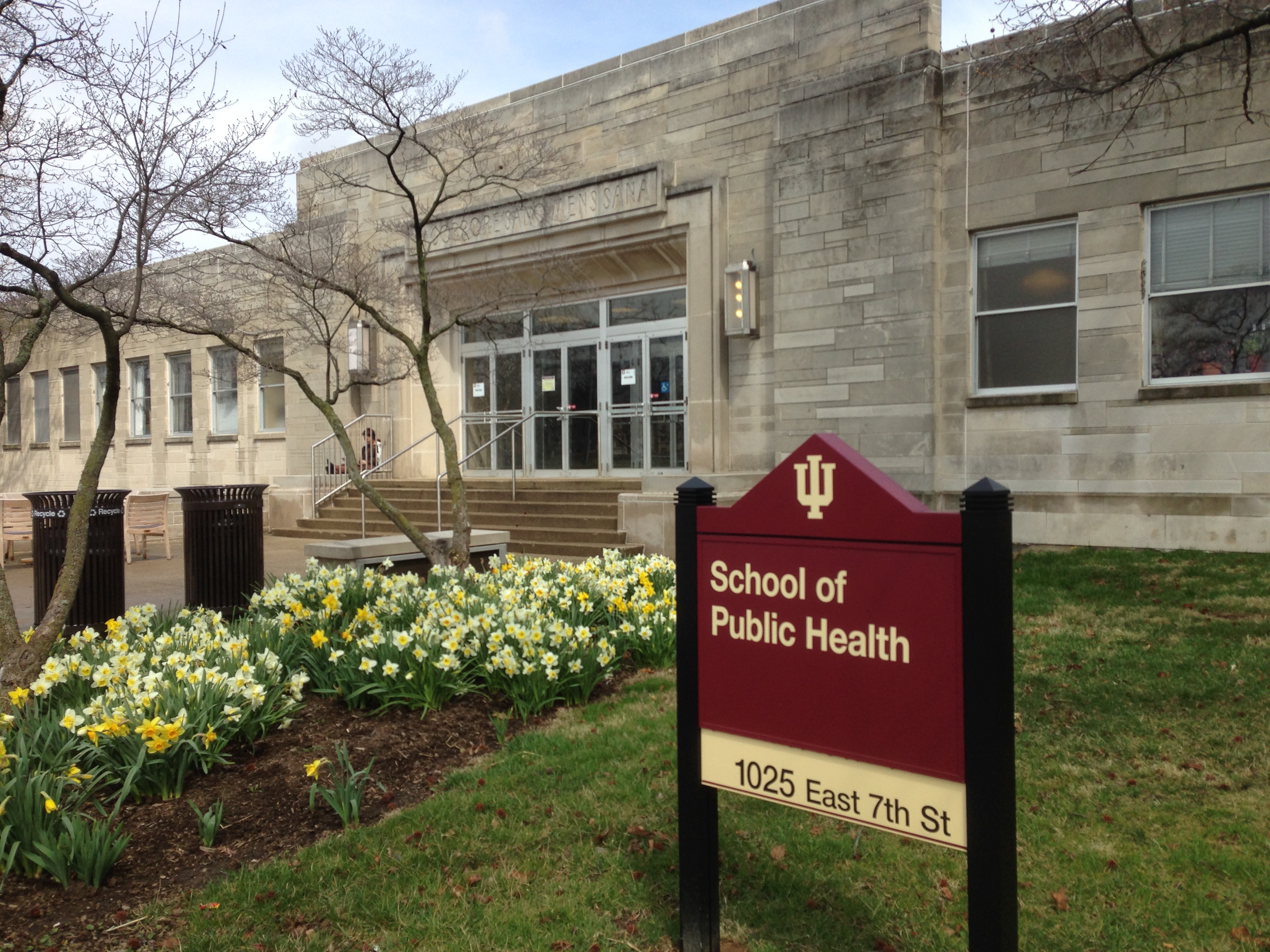
Indiana University School of Public Health-Bloomington

Founded in 1946 as the School of Health, Physical Education, and Recreation, the IU School of Public Health-Bloomington was renamed in 2012 and accredited by the Council on Education in Public Health in 2015. The school offers a broad range of undergraduate and advanced degree programs through five departments: Applied Health Science, Environmental Health, Epidemiology & Biostatistics, Kinesiology, and Recreation, Park, & Tourism Studies. With nearly 3,000 students and 24,000 alumni, it also features centers, institutes, and laboratories focused on areas like sexual health, prevention, and accessibility. The school provides extensive research and fitness facilities, including recreation centers and Bradford Woods.

=== School of Social Work ===
The Indiana University School of Social Work was founded in 1911 as the Department of Social Service, thus making it the oldest professional social work education program begun and still functioning as a part of a university. In July 2007, the Indiana University Division of Labor Studies merged with the School of Social Work.

The Department of Labor Studies, a unit housed within the School of Social Work, was founded in the 1940s during the tenure of Herman B. Wells in response to the growing role of organized labor in American society. Today, the division is one of only several degree-granting programs in the nation for the area of labor studies or industrial relations. Notable faculty in recent years have included Leonard Page, general counsel for the National Labor Relations Board during the Clinton administration, and labor economist/author Michael Yates.

=== University Graduate School ===
In 2007–08, the Graduate and Professional Student Organization partnered with the Graduate to create the Emissaries for Graduate Student Diversity program. Emissaries work either towards outreach and enrollment or retention and community building. Outreach and enrollment emissaries inform prospective students about opportunities at IU. They also help them navigate the admissions process. The retention and community-building emissaries act as mentors for current students. The Graduate School has a separate student government (Graduate and Professional Student Government, or GPSG). They collaborate with faculty to help improve the quality of services offered to graduate students attending Indiana University.

=== Faculty ===
IUB has a total of 2,081 full time faculty and 2,423 total faculty. Of the full-time faculty, about 1,019 were tenured. Like the student body, IUB's faculty is predominantly white. Of full-time administrators, faculty, and lecturers, 6.25% were Asian, 3.44% were black or African-American, 3.51% were other (includes Native American, Hispanic/Latino, Native Hawaiian/Pacific Islander, and others), and 85.8% were white. The gender ratio is roughly 50:50.

=== Undergraduate admissions ===
Undergraduate admissions statistics
- 2023 entering class
- Admit rate: 80.37% (▲ +3.46)
- Yield rate: 21.89% (▼ −1.95)

Test scores middle 50%
- SAT Total: 1180–1380 (among 41% of FTFs)
- ACT Composite: 27–32 (among 16% of FTFs)

High school GPA
- Average: 3.78

The 2022 annual ranking of U.S. News & World Report categorizes Indiana University Bloomington as "more selective". For the class of 2027 (enrolled fall 2023), Indiana received 54,279 applications and accepted 43,624, or 80.37 percent. Of those accepted, 9,550 enrolled, a yield rate (the percentage of accepted students who choose to attend the university) of 21.89 percent. Indiana's freshman retention rate is 90.3 percent, with 80.9 percent going on to graduate within six years.

Of the 41% of the incoming freshman class who submitted SAT scores; the middle 50 percent composite scores were 1180–1380. Of the 16% of enrolled freshmen in 2023 who submitted ACT scores; the middle 50 percent composite score was between 27 and 32. The average high school grade point average was 3.78.

Indiana University Bloomington is a college sponsor of the National Merit Scholarship Program, and sponsored 56 Merit Scholarship awards in 2020. In the 2020–2021 academic year, 68 freshman students were National Merit Scholars.

As of 2023, the top five Indiana counties by IU enrollment were Hamilton (Carmel, Fishers, & Noblesville) with 3,813 students, Marion (Indianapolis) with 2,883 students, Monroe (Bloomington) with 2,360 students, Lake (Gary) with 1,501 students, and Allen (Fort Wayne) with 1,266 students.

=== Rankings and reputation ===
Academic rankings

National
- Forbes: 67
- U.S. News & World Report: 73
- Washington Monthly: 72
- WSJ/College Pulse: 97

Global
- ARWU: 151–200
- QS: 306 (tie)
- THE: 189
- U.S. News & World Report: 163

Indiana University is one of 62 members of the Association of American Universities, an organization of leading North American research universities. It has been called a Public Ivy university.

The 2026 U.S. New and World Report rankings indicate that Indiana University-Bloomington ranks #73 in national universities and #34 in top public schools. It ranks #8 in business programs with accounting, marketing and management ranked #4.

The Academic Ranking of World Universities ranked IU Bloomington 101–150 in the world and 49–60 nationally in 2017. Additionally, it ranked Indiana University-Bloomington 16th in the world for Business Administration, seventh in the world for Communication, fifth in the world for Public Administration, and second in the world for Library and Information Science. U.S. News ranks IU 26th out of the top public universities in the United States. Forbes ranks IU 20th out of Public Universities.

=== Schools and programs ===
Graduate program national rankings
Program	Ranking
Audiology	12
Biological Sciences	37
Business	20
Chemistry	38
Clinical Psychology	10
Computer Science	50
Criminology	26
Earth Sciences	42
Economics	38
Education	34
English	24
Entrepreneurship	7
Fine Arts	32
History	21
Law	42
Library and Information Studies	9
Mathematics	34
Physics	50
Political Science	28
Psychology	23
Public Affairs	2
Public Health	38
Sociology	16
Speech-Language Pathology	14
Statistics	54

Business Week ranked the undergraduate business program eighth in 2014 (third among public schools) and the graduate program 15th in the nation in 2008 and fourth among public schools. Also, Business Week gave the undergraduate program an A in teaching and an A+ in career services. In 2016, Business Week ranked the undergraduate program 4th in the nation, #1 among public universities. The 2016 ranking for "Best Undergraduate Business Schools" by Poets & Quants ranked the Kelley School of Business seventh in the nation and second among public schools. In its 2012 rankings, Poets & Quants ranked Kelley's MBA program fifth in the nation in producing six Fortune 500 CEOs. In 2017, The Economist ranked the MBA program 17th in the nation, and 22nd in the world. It was ranked seventh in terms of percentage increase from pre-MBA salary.

IU Bloomington placed 13th for communication in the 2022 Shanghai Global Ranking of Academic Subjects. According to the 2020 Shanghai Global Academic Ranking of Subjects, SPEA is the second most highly ranked institution in the world for public administration.

Jacobs School of Music was ranked No. 1 in the country, tied with Juilliard and Eastman School of Music by U.S. News in 2009. U.S. News has not published a music school ranking since then. The Hollywood Reporter ranked the Jacobs School of Music #4 in 2016. Music School Central ranked Jacobs #1 in the nation in 2014.

== Libraries ==
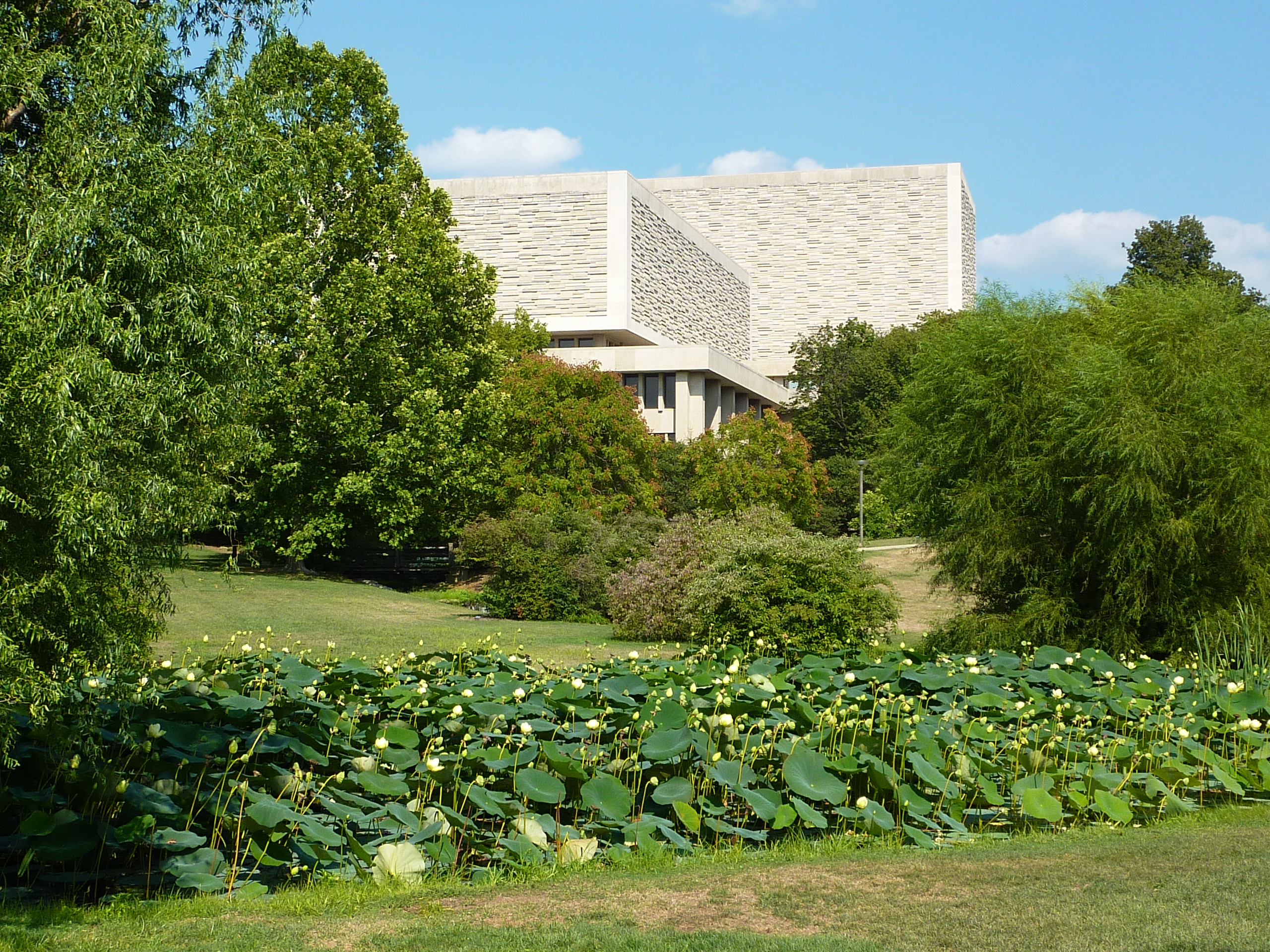
Herman B Wells Library, seen from IU Arboretum

The Indiana University Bloomington Library System supports over twenty libraries and provides access to more than 9.9 million books, 800 databases, 60,000 electronic journal titles, and 815,000 ebooks. The system is the 14th largest library in North America by volumes held.

=== Herman B Wells Library ===
IU's Herman B Wells Library holds more than 4.6 million volumes. Before a ceremony in June 2005, when it was renamed for IU's former president and chancellor, this building was simply called the Main Library. The architectural firm Eggers & Higgins designed the largely windowless, limestone paneled library, whose construction began in 1966 and was completed in 1969. The building contains eleven floors in the East Tower (research collection) and five floors in the West Tower (the undergraduate core collection). In 2014 the first floors of both towers were renovated and reintroduced as the Learning Commons and Scholars' Commons. The library is also home to Indiana University Press and the University Graduate School. It is the former home of the Information and Library Science Department, which is now hosted by Luddy Hall.

An oft-repeated urban legend holds that the library is sinking because when it was built, engineers failed to take into account the weight of all the books that would occupy the building. An article in the Indiana Daily Student newspaper debunks this myth, stating, among other things, that the building rests on a 94 ft (28.6 m) thick limestone bedrock.

=== Branch libraries ===
In addition to IU's main library, the Bloomington Libraries support more than twenty additional libraries:

- Archives of African American Music & Culture
- Archives of Traditional Music
- Black Film Center/Archive
- Business/SPEA Information Commons (library for the Kelley School of Business and the O'Neill School of Public and Environmental Affairs)
- Education Library, located within the Wendell E. Wright School of Education
- Indiana Institute on Disability and Community, Center for Disability Information and Referral (CeDIR) Library
- Indiana Prevention Resource Center Library
- Indiana University Libraries Moving Image Archive (IULMIA)
- Jerome Hall Law Library (library for the Maurer School of Law)
- Kinsey Institute Library
- LGBTQ+ Library
- Life Sciences Library (library for the Biology Department, Medical Sciences Program, and Nursing Program)
- Lilly Library (rare books and manuscripts)
- Neal-Marshall Black Culture Center Library
- Optometry Library
- Ostrom Workshop Library
- Residential Programs and Services Libraries
- The Science Library
- Sinor Research Institute for Inner Asian Studies
- University Archives and Records Management
- William & Gayle Cook Music Library
- Wylie House Museum

=== Black Film Center/Archive ===
The Black Film Center/Archive (BFC/A), located at Indiana University, was "established in 1981 as a repository of films and related materials by and about African Americans." Professor Phyllis R. Klotman founded the repository when it became apparent that rare and valuable films created by and about African Americans were being lost due to lack of preservation and inadequate resources.

The BFC/A has an extensive collection that includes films on various physical media, posters of numerous sizes for films distributed throughout the world, photographs and film stills, and manuscripts of filmmakers and scholars. Although the materials are not available for circulation or distribution, the archive has rooms for viewing films and utilizing materials.

=== Indiana University Libraries Moving Image Archive ===
The Indiana University Libraries Moving Image Archive (IULMIA) is one of the largest repositories for educational film and video in the United States. Founded in 2009, IULMIA contains over 100,000 items spanning over 80 years of audiovisual history. Highlights of its holdings include a collection of over 200 film cameras and projectors, more than 80,000 commercials from the Clio Awards, and approximately 50,000 educational films that Indiana University circulated to classrooms nationwide during the 20th century.

In 2012, the Moving Image Archive was accepted as a member of the International Federation of Film Archives.

=== Lilly Library ===
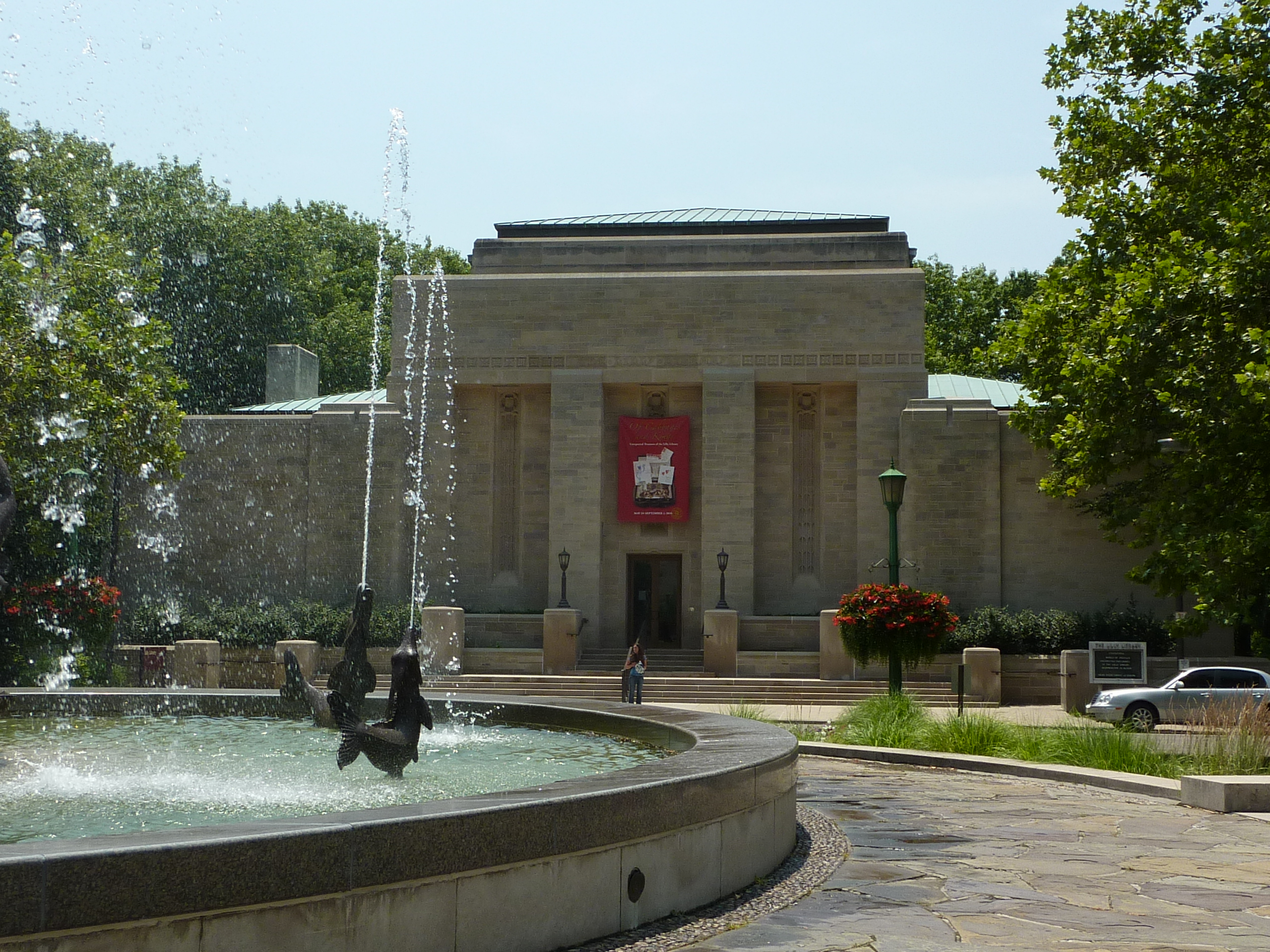
Lilly Library

Founded in 1960 with the collection of Josiah K. Lilly Jr., the Lilly Library contains approximately 400,000 rare books, 6.5 million manuscripts, and 100,000 pieces of sheet music. Notable items in the library's collections include the Gutenberg Bible and the first printed collection of Shakespeare's works.

The library is also home to four Academy Awards, donated by alumni. In 2006, the library received a collection of 30,000 mechanical puzzles from Jerry Slocum. The collection will be on permanent display. Special permission is not required to use the collections, and the library has several exhibition galleries that are open to the public.

Within the Lilly Library is the Ruth E. Adomeit collection of miniature books, one of the world's largest. In the collection are rare miniature books such as From Morn Till Eve, which presents biblical quotations in a devotional form, with one phrase for each morning and evening of a month. The Online Computer Library Center (OCLC) had stated that "the only known copy [was] in the collection of famed miniature book collector Ruth E. Adomeit"; it is now in the Lilly Library.

=== Fine Arts Library ===
IU's first Fine Arts Library was established in the late 1930s as part of the departmental office on the second floor of the east wing of the University Library, which was then in Franklin Hall. In 1941, art historian Henry Radford Hope became chairman of the Fine Arts Department, and the Fine Arts Center was created by remodeling Mitchell Hall Annex. The Fine Arts Library moved into the IU Art Museum designed by I.M. Pei in August 1981. This location was closed for renovations to the museum in the spring of 2017.

=== William and Gayle Cook Music Library ===
The William and Gayle Cook Music Library serves the Jacobs School of Music and the Bloomington Campus of Indiana University. It occupies a four-floor, 55,000 square-foot facility in a wing of the Bess Meshulam Simon Music Library and Recital Center, dedicated in November 1995. The collection comprises over 700,000 cataloged items on 56,733 linear feet of shelves.

The Cook Music Library holds many special collections, including audio and print collections. One notable collection contains items from Leonard Bernstein's compositional studio, including clothing, furniture, recordings, books, and awards.

=== Residence hall libraries ===
Residence hall library programs began in the 1930s at Harvard University. By 1978, there were twenty-one institutions with residential library systems. Today, Indiana University has only one of two residential library programs that still operates. As of 2018 there were fourteen library branches: Briscoe, Campus View Apartments, Collins LLC, Eigenmann, Forest, Foster, McNutt, Read, Spruce, Teter, Union Street Center, Wells Quad, Wilkie, and Wright.

== Student life ==
Student body composition as of September 2024
Race and ethnicity	Total
White	68%
Asian	9%
Hispanic	8%
Foreign national	5%
Other (Note: Other consists of multiracial Americans & those who prefer to not say.)	5%
Black	4%
Economic diversity
Low-income (Note: The percentage of students who received an income-based federal Pell grant intended for low-income students.)	18%
Affluent (Note: The percentage of students who are a part of the American middle class at the bare minimum.)	82%

The Indiana University Student Government is the undergraduate student body government. The IUSA Funding Board allocates funds for student programming and initiatives.

The Little 500 is a track cycling race held annually during the third weekend of April at Bill Armstrong Stadium. It is attended by more than 25,000 fans. Billed as "The World's Greatest College Weekend", the race has expanded into a week of activities. The Women's Little 500 (100 laps; 25 mi (40 km)), first held in 1988, is run each year. As of 2019, the Little 500 has raised a total of more than $2 million in scholarship funds.

=== Media ===
Media outlets of Indiana University include:

- WFIU radio – a charter member of the National Public Radio network, WFIU is a public radio station operating out of the Radio and TV Center on the Bloomington, Indiana Campus. Licensed to the Trustees of Indiana University, it is funded by several sources: Indiana University; the Corporation for Public Broadcasting; program underwriting grants from community businesses and organizations; and voluntary contributions from listeners. Programming centers on classical music, national and international news. Other formats include folk music, jazz, comedy, and news & public affairs programming.
- WTIU television – a 24-hour public television licensed to Indiana University, operating out of the Radio and TV Center on the Bloomington, Indiana campus. WTIU is a PBS affiliate and carries national and locally produced programming, serving over 20 counties in west and south-central Indiana, including the cities of Bloomington, Bedford, Columbus, and Terre Haute, and the communities of Martinsville, Linton, Bloomfield, Nashville, Spencer, and Seymour. Approximately 175,000 TV households are included in the viewing area, cable and off-air combined.
- IUSTV (Indiana University student television station) – an entirely student-run television station broadcasting to over 12,000 on-campus residents and over 40,000 Bloomington residents via Public-access television. Founded in 2002, IUSTV has quickly grown to be a leading media entity and student organization on campus.
- Indiana Daily Student – free daily newspaper fully supported financially through ad sales. Founded in 1867, it has a circulation of over 15,000 and is produced by IU students.
- WIUX – an entirely student-run radio station that broadcasts currently on FM 99.1 and via live internet streaming on its website. It broadcasts 24 hours a day, 7 days a week during the fall and spring semesters. Besides playing independent music, the station provides coverage of nine different Indiana University sports teams. The station was established in 1963 under the call letters WQAD. It was granted a low-power FM license in the spring of 2005 and transitioned to FM in early 2006.

== Athletics ==
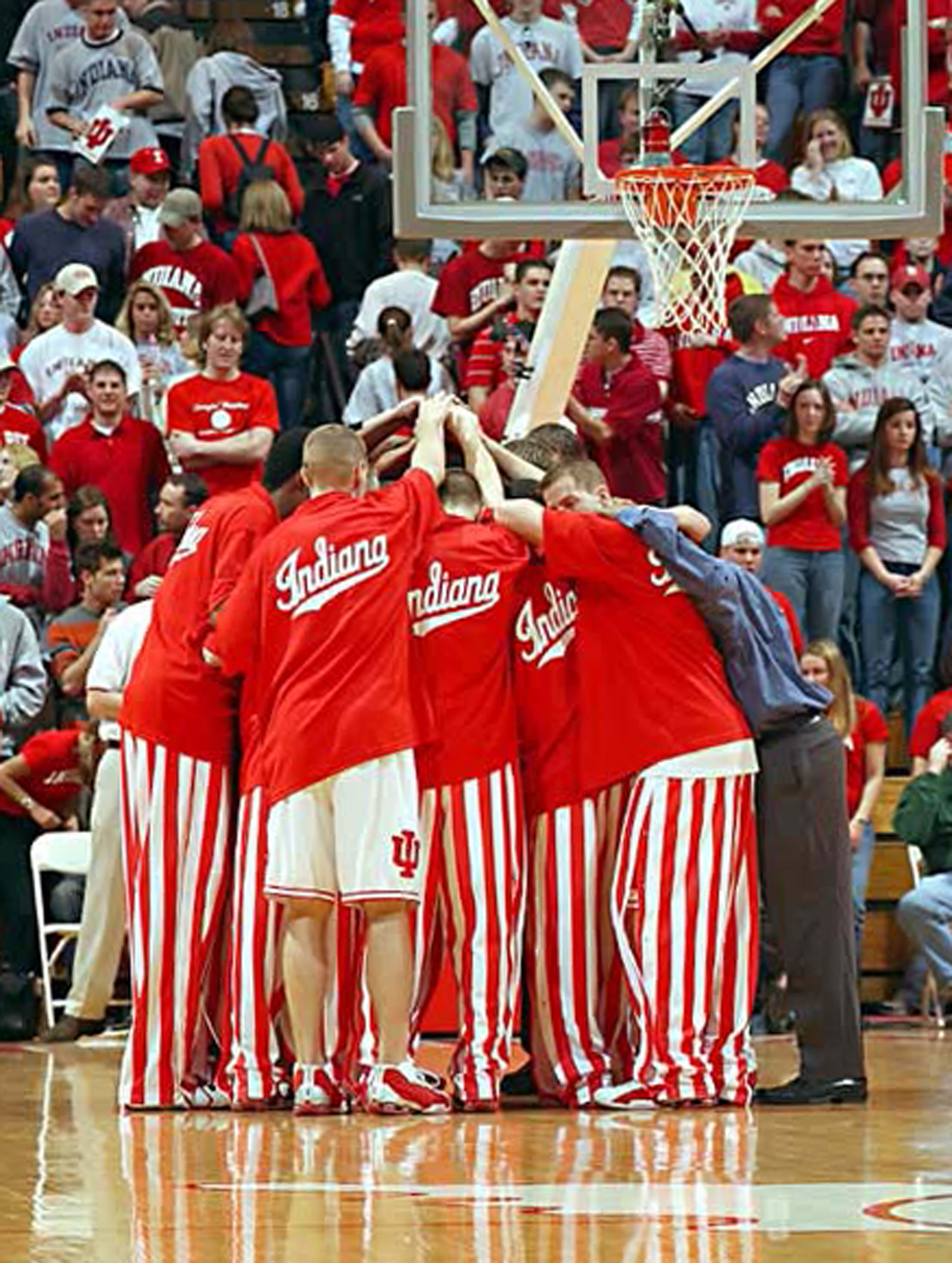
Basketball players huddle before a game in their candy striped pants.

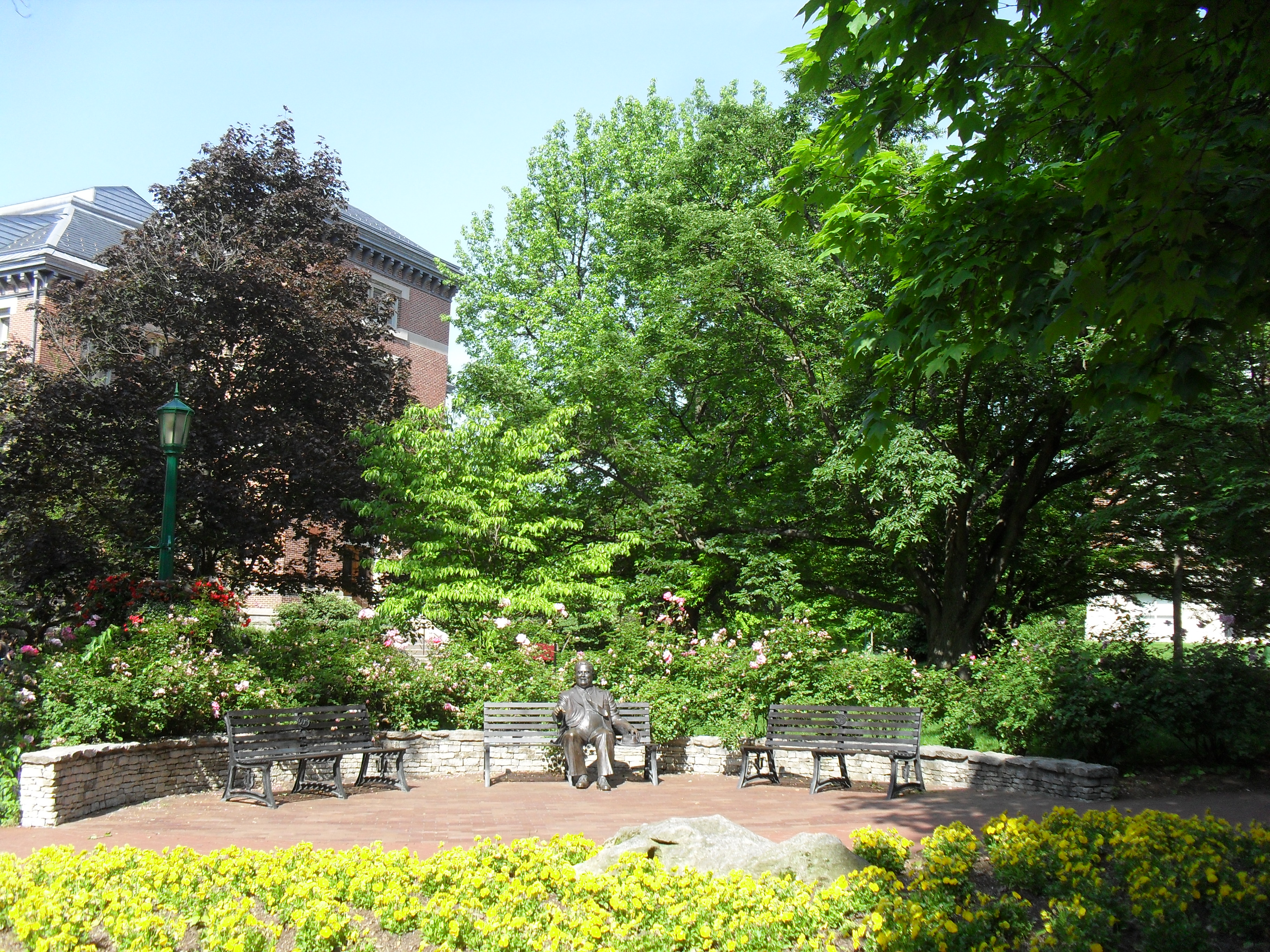
Statue of Herman B. Wells

IU's intercollegiate athletics program has a long tradition in several key sports. From its beginnings with baseball in 1867, the Hoosier athletic program has grown to include over 600 male and female student-athletes on 24 varsity teams. Sports sponsored by the university include football, men's basketball, women's basketball, cross country and track, softball, baseball, golf, tennis, rowing, volleyball, swimming and diving, and wrestling.

The Hoosiers became a member of the Big Ten Conference on December 1, 1899. The school's national affiliation is with the National Collegiate Athletic Association (NCAA). National team titles (now totaling 26; 25 NCAA, 1 AIAW) have been won in nine men's sports and one women's sport (tennis), topped by a record-setting six straight men's swimming & diving titles, eight men's soccer crowns and five titles in men's basketball. Indiana University's men's basketball team has won five national championships. Indiana student-athletes have won 133 NCAA individual titles, including 79 in men's swimming and diving and 31 in men's track and field. Also, IU teams have won or shared 157 Big Ten Conference championships.

The IU athletics endowment is $42 million, the largest in the Big Ten. The Varsity Club, which is the fundraising arm of the Athletics Department, drew a record $11.5 million in gifts and pledges in fiscal year 2004–05. Also, overall annual giving has increased by 8.3 percent in the last year and 44.8 percent in the last three years.

In addition to its tradition in intervarsity sports, IU also has many non-varsity sports. Hurling has also become more popular, with the Indiana University Hurling Club becoming the first American national champions in history.

=== Athletic facilities ===
Indiana University's athletic facilities include Assembly Hall (home to the IU's NCAA basketball teams), Cook Hall, Memorial Stadium, Mellencamp Pavilion, the Gladstein Fieldhouse, the IU Tennis Center, the Billy Hayes Track, and the Bill Armstrong Stadium.

== Notable faculty and alumni ==
Indiana has the second-largest collegiate alumni network with over 650,000 members. Indiana alumni include 10 Nobel Prize laureates, 19 Rhodes Scholars, 19 Marshall Scholars, 6 Churchill Scholars, 20 Truman Scholars, 5 Mitchell Scholars, 4 Udall Scholars, and 63 Goldwater Scholars. The university houses more than 750 student organizations on campus and with around 17 percent of undergraduates joining the Greek system.

Notable current faculty include cognitive scientist Douglas Hofstadter, mathematician Russell Lyons, violinist Joshua Bell, and pianist André Watts. Notable past Indiana faculty and alumni include Hermann Joseph Muller, pioneering radiation geneticist and winner of the 1946 Nobel Prize; James Watson, co-discoverer of the double helical structure of DNA and sharer of the 1962 Nobel Prize; Salvador Luria, molecular biologist and co-winner of the 1969 Nobel Prize; Tuareg political leader and folclorist Mano Dayak; Jimmy Wales, the co-founder of Wikipedia; Robert Gates, the 22nd United States secretary of defense; former CEO of Disney, Bob Chapek; Jeri Taylor, screenwriter and co-creator of Star Trek: Voyager; author Suzanne Collins, who wrote The Hunger Games series; composer and songwriter Hoagy Carmichael; John Chambers, former CEO of Cisco Systems; Indian actor Ranveer Singh; mathematician Max August Zorn; sexologist Alfred Kinsey; poet Yusef Komunyakaa; and billionaire investor Mark Cuban.
