= John D. Ciorciari =

American political scientist and legal scholar

- John D. Ciorciari

Provost and Executive Vice Chancellor of Indiana University Bloomington
- Incumbent
- Assumed office October 6, 2026

Personal details
- Education: Harvard College (AB); Harvard Law School (JD); University of Oxford (MPhil, DPhil)

John David Ciorciari is a scholar of international politics and law who has served as provost and executive vice chancellor of Indiana University Bloomington since October 2026.

He previously served as dean of IU's Hamilton Lugar School of Global and International Studies and a professor at the University of Michigan's Gerald R. Ford School of Public Policy. His scholarship examines international relations in Southeast Asia, international criminal justice, and governance in fragile states.

== Education ==
Ciorciari earned an A.B. in biochemistry from Harvard College in 1995 and a J.D. from Harvard Law School in 1998. He subsequently earned an M.Phil. in international relations in 2002 and a D.Phil. in international relations in 2007 from the University of Oxford, where he was a Fulbright Scholar.

== Career ==
Before entering academia, Ciorciari practiced law at Davis Polk & Wardwell and worked in the U.S. Department of the Treasury's Office of International Affairs. His Treasury positions included deputy director of the Office of South and Southeast Asia. He held a Shorenstein postdoctoral fellowship at Stanford University in 2007–2008 and a national fellowship at the Hoover Institution in 2008–2009.

Ciorciari began working as pro bono legal advisor to the Documentation Center of Cambodia in 1999. The center documents atrocities committed under the Khmer Rouge and supports historical memory and accountability efforts.

He joined the University of Michigan's Ford School as an assistant professor in 2009 and was promoted to associate professor with tenure in 2016 and to professor in 2022. He co-directed the International Policy Center from 2014 to 2016 and directed it from 2016 to 2023. He was the founding director of the Weiser Diplomacy Center, serving from 2018 to 2023, and associate dean for research and policy engagement from 2022 to 2023.

Ciorciari became dean of Indiana University's Hamilton Lugar School of Global and International Studies on March 1, 2024. He was appointed interim provost and executive vice chancellor of IU Bloomington in February 2026 and named to the permanent position on October 6, 2026.

== Research ==
Ciorciari's research examines how Southeast Asian states manage their relationships with major powers. In The Limits of Alignment (2010), he argues that developing countries often favor limited alignments that provide security cooperation while reducing dependence on stronger states.

His international justice scholarship includes Hybrid Justice (2014), coauthored with Anne Heindel, which examines the establishment, institutional design, and operation of the Extraordinary Chambers in the Courts of Cambodia.

In Sovereignty Sharing in Fragile States (2021), Ciorciari examines arrangements through which domestic and international actors share authority over courts, policing, and anti-corruption initiatives.

With Kiyoteru Tsutsui, he coedited The Courteous Power (2021), examining Japan's relationships with Southeast Asia.

== Honors and memberships ==
Ciorciari was selected as an Andrew Carnegie Fellow in 2015. He received the U.S. Treasury Department's Secretary's Honor Award in 2005 and Meritorious Service Award in 2007. In 2026, he was elected a lifetime member of the Council on Foreign Relations.

== Selected publications ==
- The Limits of Alignment: Southeast Asia and the Great Powers since 1975. Georgetown University Press, 2010.
- With Anne Heindel. Hybrid Justice: The Extraordinary Chambers in the Courts of Cambodia. University of Michigan Press, 2014.
- Sovereignty Sharing in Fragile States. Stanford University Press, 2021.
- Coedited with Kiyoteru Tsutsui. The Courteous Power: Japan and Southeast Asia in the Indo-Pacific Era. University of Michigan Press, 2021.
