= Indiana University Summer Language Workshop =

Coordinates: 39.170083°N 86.517766°W

The Indiana University Language Workshop (formerly known as SWSEEL) is one of the oldest and largest summer language programs in the United States. Located on the Bloomington campus of Indiana University (IU), the workshop was founded in 1950 at the height of the Cold War to provide intensive training in Russian and later other less commonly taught foreign languages. For almost 75 years of its existence, the Workshop has provided language training to over ten thousand students. It is widely known in the United States for its quality and variety, especially among university programs in Slavic, East European and Central Eurasian studies.

== History ==
The first workshop was held from June 20 to July 25, 1951. It was called "Russian Workshop for graduate and undergraduate students" and was advertised as a "five-week course for men and women who desire a better understanding of the Russian language." Sponsored by the IU Department of Slavic Studies and the IU Summer School, it was limited to 40 "qualified students." The cost of tuition, board, and room in 1951 came to $185.

The program was successful and soon grew to the point where yearly enrollments numbered about 200 students. In 1963 Polish and Serbo-Croatian languages were added and the program, now encompassing eight weeks of study, was renamed as the Slavic Workshop. Soon Czech language was added. The Slavic Workshop also featured language study tours to the Soviet Union, in which more than 100 students participated each summer. When the program underwent a significant expansion in the 1990s with the addition of several new languages, including non-Slavic languages, it was rechristened the Summer Workshop in Slavic and East European Languages (SWSEEL), a name that remained in place (despite the increasingly prominent role of Central Asian and other languages from outside of Eastern Europe) until 2013, when it received its current name of the Indiana University Language Workshop.

== Languages ==
The language offerings in the Summer Language Workshop vary every summer. To date (through the summer of 2023), a total of 50 languages have been taught in Summer Language Workshop. Russian is the only language that has been taught every summer since the foundation of the program. The other languages are: Akan, Albanian, Arabic, Azerbaijani, Bosnian, Bulgarian, Chechen, Chinese, Croatian, Czech, Dari, Dutch, Estonian, Finnish, Georgian, Haitian Creole, Haka-Lai (Chin), Hindi-Urdu, Hungarian, Indonesian, Japanese, Kazakh, Korean, Kyrgyz, Kurdish, Latvian, Lithuanian, Macedonian, Mongolian, Norwegian, Pashto, Persian, Polish, Portuguese, Romanian, Serbian/Croatian, Slovak, Slovene, Swahili, Tajik, Tatar, Tibetan, Turkish, Turkmen, Uighur, Ukrainian, Uzbek, Vietnamese, Yiddish, and Zapotec.

== Directors ==
1951 – 1952 Michael Ginsburg

1953 – 1961 Joseph T. Shaw

1962 – 1965 Albert C. Todd, Jr.,

1966 Robert L. Baker

1967 – 1968 Maurice I. Levin

1969 Charles Gribble

1971 – 1972 Ernest Scatton

1973 Stephen Soudakoff

1974 Daniel Armstrong, Stephen Soudakoff (co-directors)

1975 – 1976 Daniel Armstrong, Rodney Sangster, Stephen Soudakoff (co-directors)

1978 Daniel Armstrong, Ronald Feldstein (co-directors)

1979 Ronald Feldstein

1986 – 2009 Jerzy Kolodziej

2009 – 2016 Ariann Stern-Gottschalk

2016 - 2017 Mark Trotter

2017 - Kathleen Evans

== Instructors ==
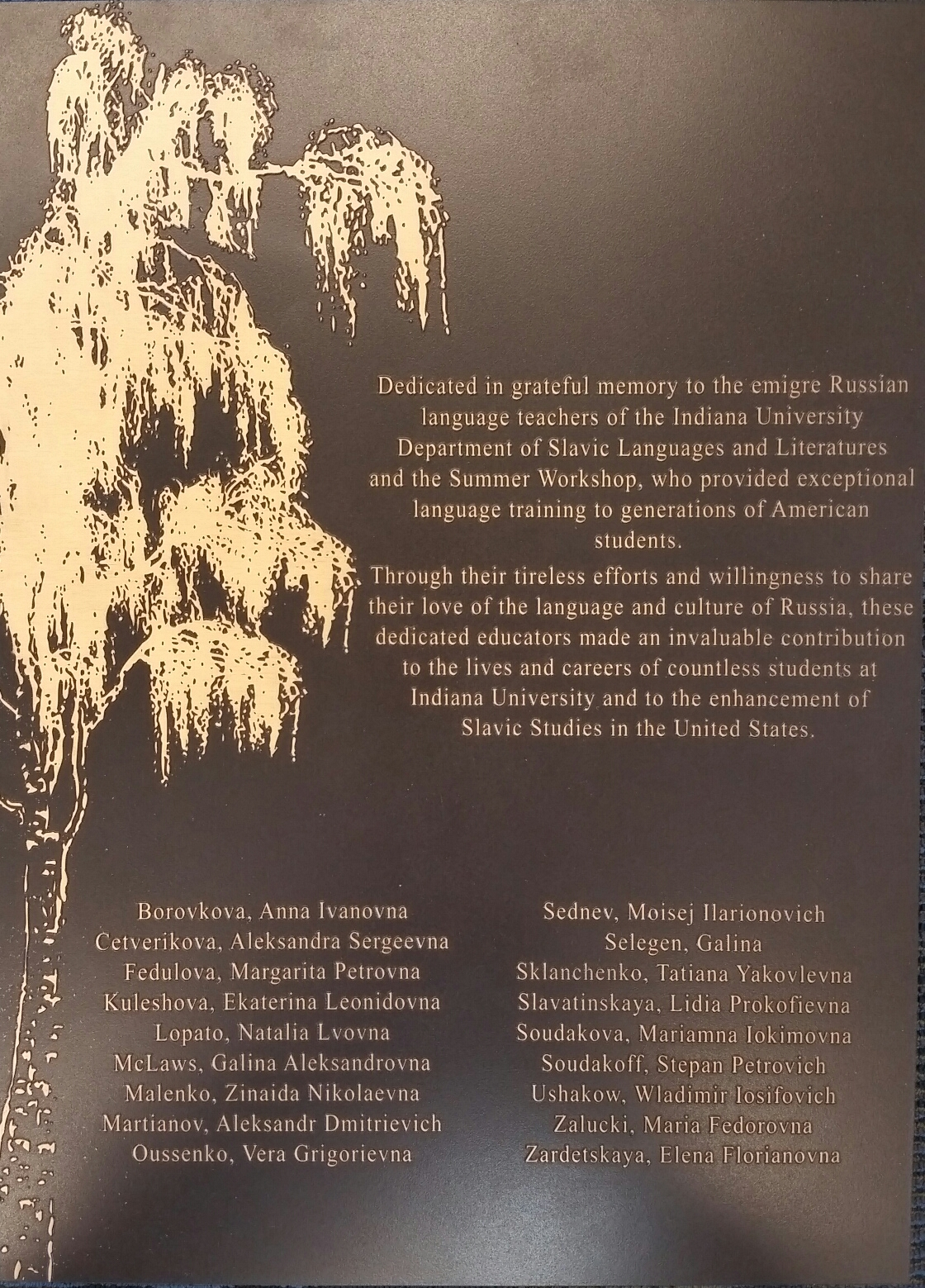
Memorial plaque dedicated to the émigré Russian language teachers of the Indiana University Department of Slavic Languages and Literatures and the Summer Workshop.

Russian émigré instructors played a very important role in the program, especially through the 1950s and 1960s. The contribution of Russian émigrés to both the Language Workshop and the IU Department of Slavic Languages and Literatures is recognized by a plaque, first proposed in 2002 by William Hopkins, a PhD alumnus of Indiana University, former Summer Language Workshop instructor, and translator for the US Department of State. The inscription on the plaque reads: "Dedicated in grateful memory to the emigre Russian language teachers of the Indiana University Department of Slavic Languages and Literatures and the Summer Workshop, who provided exceptional language training to generations of American students. Through their tireless efforts and willingness to share their love of the language and culture of Russia, these dedicated educators made an invaluable contribution to the lives and careers of countless students at Indiana University and to the enhancement of Slavic Studies in the United States". The following teachers are listed on the plaque: Borovkova, Anna Ivanovna; Cetverikova, Aleksandra Sergeevna; Fedulova, Margarita Petrovna; Kuleshova, Ekaterina Leonidovna; Lopato, Natalia Lvovna; McLaws, Galina Aleksandrovna; Malenko, Zinaida Nikolaevna; Martianov, Aleksandr Dmitrievich; Oussenko, Vera Grigorievna; Sednev, Moisej Ilarionovich; Selegen, Galina; Sklanchenko, Tatiana Yakovlevna; Slaviatinskaya, Lidia Prokofievna; Soudakova, Mariamna Iokimovna; Soudakoff, Stepan Petrovich; Ushakow, Wladimir Iosifovich; Zalucki, Maria Fedorovna; Zardetskaya, Elena Florianovna. Among the most notable Russian emigres who taught in the Summer Language Workshop in 1962 and 1963 is prominent Russian writer Nina Berberova. Of the hundreds of other instructors who either taught languages or delivered guest lectures at the Summer Language Workshop, some of the most well-known include Slavists Felix Oinas, Edward L. Keenan, Charles Townsend, Charles Gribble, Carl Proffer, Frank Miller, Helena Goscilo.
