= Business/SPEA Library =

- 39.172710694349014°N 86.51758461166135°W
- Location: USA
- Type: University Library
- Established: 1935

Other information
- Director: Ilana Sttonebraker
- Parent organization: Indiana University
- Website: https://libraries.indiana.edu/businessspea-library

The Business/SPEA Library, formerly known as the Business/SPEA Information Commons, serves the research and study needs of faculty and students of Indiana University's Kelley School of Business and the School of Public and Environmental Affairs (SPEA). The Commons is a part of the Indiana University Libraries system and modeled on the successful implementation of the commons concept in library management both at IU and major university libraries.

The Business/SPEA Library provides access to a wide variety of electronic databases and print resources in a setting that promotes collaborative research. The Business/SPEA Lib is centrally located between the Schools of Business and SPEA. In addition to the circulating print collection, there is a reference room which includes print materials and electronic databases such as Bloomberg, Valueline, and Datastream. The Business/SPEA Library includes a staff of three librarians, professional assistants, support staff, and part-time student employees.

== History ==
The current combined library for the School of Business and the School of Public and Environmental Affairs dates back to 1935 when Herman B Wells, then Dean of the School of Business, appointed a library committee to investigate the establishment of a departmental library.

There were several reasons in favor of establishing a library. The first was the distance of the School of Business (then located in the Social Science Building) from the University Library (then located in Franklin Hall). Instead of using the time between classes to study, students would do everything but study rather than walk two blocks to the University Library. Secondly, the University Library reading rooms were always crowded. Third, faculty members needed a convenient location to store the supplementary texts which they had placed on reserve for their students. Faculty members thought these texts should be located in close proximity to where students attended class. Fourth, business and economics students needed specialized help which the generalists at the University Library could not provide. Finally, faculty members believed that student study habits would be improved if they had a reading room near their classrooms.

Several steps were taken prior to the establishment of the Library. A supervised study hall was set up in 1936 to see whether students would use it. Proving successful, the Board of Trustees authorized a Business Administration Reading Room with an appropriation of $600 to furnish the room. The first books in the library were delivered by Harold Lusk, Chairman of the Library committee which established the Library delivered the Library's first books in his car! The reading room had 61 seats and was open from 7:45 a.m. to 9:50 p.m. Monday through Friday, 7:45 a.m. to 5:00 p.m. on Saturday and 2 p.m. to 9:50 p.m. on Sunday. Library rules directed that overdue books were to be returned to the Dean's office and that fines should be paid there.

Located in the west corner of the second floor of the Social Science Building, the reading room was originally staffed by participants in the National Youth Administration, one of the New Deal agencies established by Franklin Roosevelt. A consensus soon developed that the Business School must hire a professionally trained librarian with experience in acquiring new materials, managing the reading room, and organizing the collection. When Geraldine Bariani was hired, her first move was to compile a card catalog for the Reading Room's materials. Perhaps the most important acquisition was a complete set of Listing Statements of the New York Stock Exchange from 1884 to 1930. Bariani believed that the Business Library was the only library except for the NYSE to own the complete set.

In 1940, a survey by the American Library Association of IU's branch libraries found that the Business and Economics Library was used more than any other branch. So it was propitious that when the Business School moved into a new building (now named Woodburn Hall) in 1940, of course the Library moved along with it and received several benefits, including more space for a larger collection. A new assistant librarian was hired in accordance with the faculty's wish that the reading room should be staffed at all hours that the Library was open.

While serving as Business School Librarian, Bariani wrote her master's thesis in which she outlined her objectives for the Business and Economics Library:

- Provide adequate materials of instruction for faculty members, researchers, and undergraduates as each may need them for his individual instruction;
- To supply the materials of instruction which cover the descriptive, analytical, and technical aspects of business, as these are presented for the enlightenment of the student and for the continued study of the faculty members;
- To collect the raw data and source materials of instruction which enable the researcher to prove or disprove his theories;
- To furnish instructional materials of a general and browsing nature which the student may turn to in his leisure time, acquaintance with which is expected of the educated citizen;
- To make all these materials conveniently and easily available to users and to assist in their location if they are not;
- To offer a comfortable and attractive location for the consultation of materials conducive to quiet reflection and to productive study.

In 1942, IU's library system was reorganized and the Business and Economics Library's status changed from an independent library to a reserve library. The periodical collection was limited to current copies of business periodicals and the older bound copies of business journals were kept in the central library.

The Rawles Reading Room, named in honor of the first Dean of the School of Business was dedicated in May 1942 and planned as a browsing room for cultural reading. There were works by Shakespeare, Aristotle, Homer and Plato and more recent books such as Bellamy's Looking Backward and Pearl Buck's The Good Earth. It was Rawles' intention to "provide for the Students in his School cultural books which would broaden and enrich their background."

In 1966, the School of Business and its Library moved from Woodburn Hall to 10th Street across from the Main Library which was then under construction.

In 1973, the School of Public and Environmental Affairs (SPEA) was established in the Poplars Research Center.

In 1982, a new complex of buildings was dedicated connecting the Schools of Business and of Public and Environmental Affairs. The School of Business' building was renovated and a new building was put up for the School of Public and Environmental Affairs, which was then housed in the Poplars Research and Conference Center. The two schools were linked by a spacious outdoor plaza and a new Business/SPEA Library with holdings of 120,000 volumes, including 2400 periodical volumes.

The library cost $16 million to build. The new library's design won a 1983 National Exhibit Award from the American Association of School Administrators, a 1983 Design Award from the National School Boards Association, and a 1984 Merit Award from the Minnesota Society of Landscape Architects. The design successfully expanded the Business School Library's space and created an entirely new facility for SPEA.

Renovations on the library began in December 2009 and completed in February 2011. The new library space has over 14 study rooms, 24 group work areas, a quiet individual study area with 40 carrels, 44 computer workstations, and a café, as well as new seating, all in service of a core collection of approximately 15,000 print volumes. Students helped contribute to the final design of the 23,500-square-foot (2,180 m^{2}) space "during a case study competition for a Kelley School of Business course", with the best ideas presented by students being incorporated into the new plan.
