= David Bosco =

Journalist; author; academic

David L. Bosco is an American journalist, author and academic who writes on the subject of international relations with a focus on the United Nations, international courts, and the law of the sea. Currently, he is the interim dean of Indiana University's Hamilton Lugar School of Global and International Studies.

== Early life ==
He was born and grew up in Washington, DC, where he attended St. Albans School. In 1995, Bosco received an A.B. (Bachelor of Arts), magna cum laude, from Harvard College, where he was also the associate editorial chair of The Harvard Crimson. He earned an M.Phil. (Master of Philosophy) in international relations from Cambridge University in 1996. In 2001, Bosco earned a J.D. (Juris Doctor), magna cum laude, from Harvard Law School.

== Career ==
Bosco worked on refugee issues in post-war Bosnia. He began as a volunteer with the American Refugee Committee and then became head of its Sarajevo office. He later served as deputy director of a joint United Nations/NATO project on repatriating refugees in Sarajevo. After returning to the United States and while enrolled in Harvard Law School, Bosco interned at NATO Military Headquarters in Mons, Belgium. In 2000, he served as a law clerk in the legal advisor's office of the U.S. State Department. After graduating from law school, Bosco was a Fulbright Scholar in Santiago, Chile, from 2001 to 2002. He conducted research on criminal justice reform and published a feature article in Legal Affairs. From 2002 to 2004 he was an attorney at Cleary, Gottlieb, Steen & Hamilton. There, he specialized in international arbitration, litigation and antitrust law. From 2004 to 2006, he was senior editor at Foreign Policy magazine.

In his current position at Indiana University, Bosco teaches courses on world politics, international organization, and international law. In 2023, he was named executive associate dean of Indiana University's Hamilton Lugar School of Global and International Studies. He has also designed and taught courses on the International Criminal Court and the United Nations at American University's Washington College of Law.

== Major awards ==
- 2023: Fulbright Research Scholar, Spain
- 2008: Next Generation Fellow in the study of international organizations, American Assembly
- 2001: Fulbright Scholar, Chile
- 2001: Frederick Sheldon Prize
- 2000: Derek Bok Teaching Prize at Harvard University

== Books ==
- The Poseidon Project: The Struggle to Govern the World's Oceans
- Rough Justice, David Bosco (Oxford University Press, 2014). ISBN 978-0199844135
- Five to Rule Them All (Oxford University Press, 2009). ISBN 978-0195328769

== Major published articles ==
- "Course Corrections: The Obama Administration at the United Nations," Hague Journal of Diplomacy 6 (2011), 335–349.
- "The International Criminal Court and Crime Prevention: Byproduct or Conscious Goal? " 19 Michigan State Journal of International Law 163 (2010).
- "The Lost Ambassador," The Washington Post, Outlook Section, April 4, 2010.
- "Military Necessity vs. Moral Principle," The American Scholar, Vol. 77, No. 1, Winter 2008.
- "The Debt Frenzy," [article on sovereign debt lawsuits] Foreign Policy, July/August 2007.

== TV appearances and radio broadcasts ==
Bosco has provided commentary and analysis for CNN International, National Public Radio, and the Voice of America.
