= Indiana University–Purdue University =

Indiana University and Purdue University jointly managed several universities between the mid-1960s and early 2020s. The partnership officially ceased in 2024.

Indiana University–Purdue University may refer to:

- Indiana University–Purdue University Indianapolis (1969–2024) split into:
  - Indiana University Indianapolis (inherited the IUPUI Jaguars)
  - Purdue University in Indianapolis
- Indiana University–Purdue University Fort Wayne (1964–2018) split into:
  - Indiana University Fort Wayne
  - Purdue University Fort Wayne (inherited the IPFW Mastodons)
- Indiana University–Purdue University Columbus (1970–2024) became Indiana University Columbus in 2024
- Indiana University–Purdue University Indianapolis Public Art Collection, is now managed by IUI after the split was completed

== See also ==
- Indiana–Purdue rivalry
