= TransPAC2 =

Organization

- Formation: 2005
- Type: non-profit
- Purpose: Educational network
- Website: www.transpac2.net

The TransPAC2 Network was a US National Science Foundation-funded high-speed international computer network circuit connecting national research and education networks in the Asia-Pacific region to those in the US. It was the continuation of the TransPAC project which ran from 2000 through 2005.

== History ==
The first TransPAC effort started in 1998. The original link of 35 Mbit/sec connected to the Very high-speed Backbone Network Service (vBNS) near Chicago. TransPAC2's Network Operations Center was located in the Informatics and Communications Technology Complex in Indianapolis, Indiana on the Indiana University – Purdue University Indianapolis (IUPUI) campus. The NOC operated 24 hours a day and 7 days a week starting in October 1998. In May 1999 link speed was expanded to 73 Mbit/s with funding from the Japan Science and Technology Corporation. In June 2000 link speed increased to 100 Mbit/s, and in September to 155 Mbit/s. In May 2001, equipment from Cisco Systems replaced that from Juniper Networks in Chicago. The principal investigator for this first phase was Michael McRobbie.

The NSF awarded a follow-on grant on December 20, 2004, with principal investigators James Williams and Douglas Van Houweling. TransPAC2 was part of the NSF's International Research Network Connections (IRNC) program. In April 2005, a single OC-192 circuit was provided by KDDI America. It connected to the Asia Pacific Advanced Network in Tokyo and to a TransPAC2-managed router in Los Angeles. The Los Angeles router, using the TransPAC2 Autonomous System number 22388, maintained a 10 Gigabit Ethernet connection to the CENIC managed Pacific Wave Ethernet switch. This connection enabled direct peering with the Internet2 Abilene Network, National LambdaRail and other high speed networks on the US West Coast.

Use of the TransPAC2 network was limited to the networks carried by other research and education network aggregators. In the Pacific region, this list includes APAN, TEIN2, and AARNet. In North America, the primary connection is via the Internet2 Abilene network, though TransPAC2 peers with other R&E networks at the Pacific Wave Exchange Point.

In February 2006, TransPAC2 established direct connection to JGN2 switch in Los Angeles.

The grant expired at the end of 2011. A total of about $6.3 million was awarded for TransPAC2.
