= Nasser Paydar =

American-Iranian chancellor and administrator (born 1956)

Nasser H. Paydar
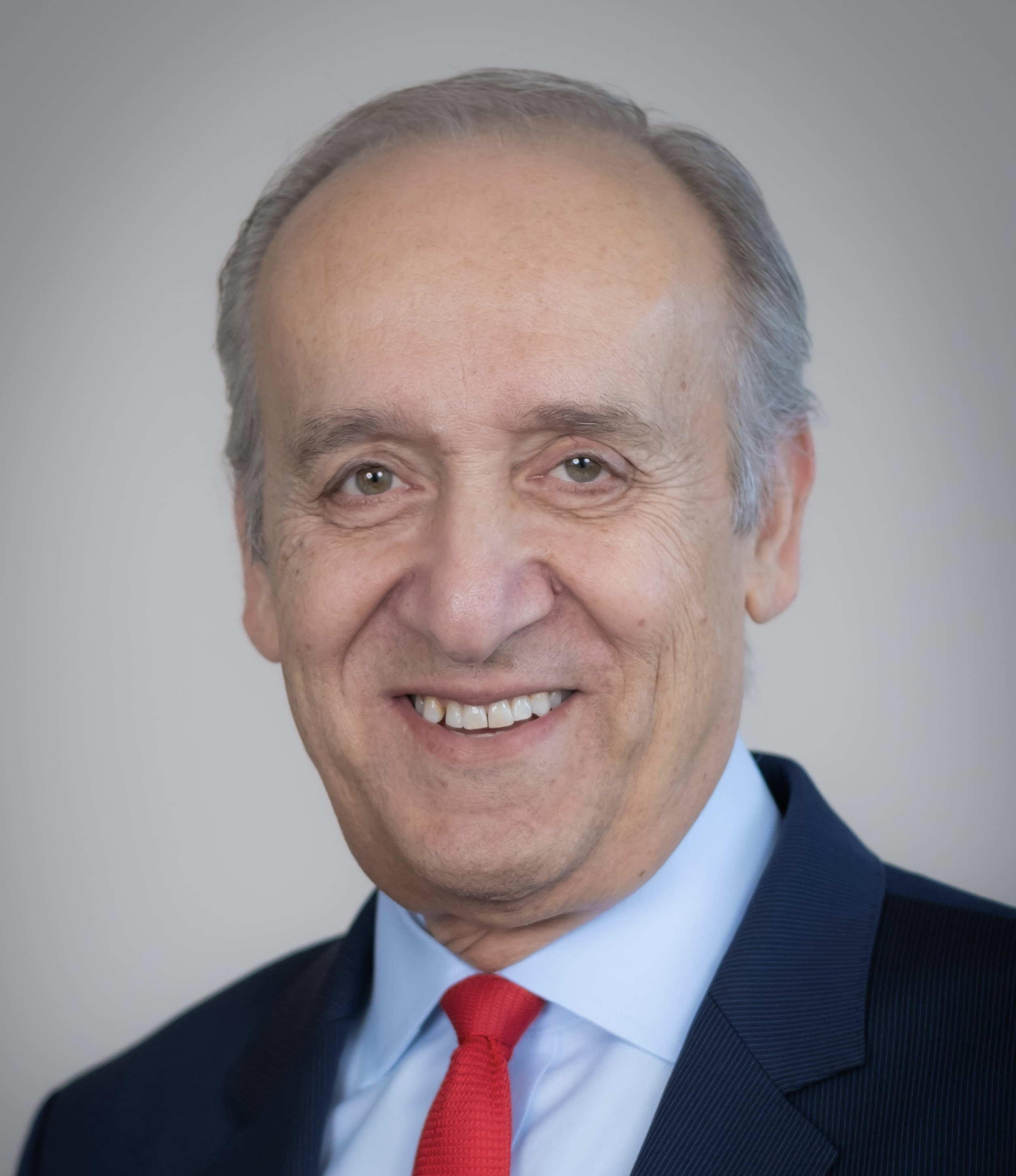

President of the Council for Higher Education Accreditation
- Incumbent
- Assumed office August 1, 2025

Assistant Secretary of Education for Postsecondary Education
- In office August 12, 2022 – January 20, 2025
- President: Joe Biden
- Preceded by: Robert L. King
- Succeeded by: David R. Barker

5th Chancellor of Indiana University–Purdue University Indianapolis
- In office August 15, 2015 – February 28, 2022
- President: Michael McRobbie; Pamela Whitten
- Preceded by: Charles R. Bantz
- Succeeded by: Andrew R. Klein (interim); Latha Ramchand

5th Chancellor of Indiana University East
- In office January 1, 2009 – June 14, 2012
- President: Michael McRobbie
- Succeeded by: Larry Richards (interim); Kathryn Girten
- Interim
- In office June 2007 – December 31, 2008
- Preceded by: David Fulton

3rd Vice-Chancellor of Indiana University Columbus
- In office 2004–2007
- President: Adam Herbert
- Preceded by: Paul Bippen
- Succeeded by: Jay Howard (interim); Marwan Wafa

Personal details
- Born: October 31, 1956 (age 69) Tehran, Iran
- Education: Syracuse University (BS, MS, PhD)

Nasser H. Paydar (born October 31, 1956) is an American academic administrator who serves as the President of the Council for Higher Education Accreditation (CHEA), a role he began in August 2025. He previously served as the Assistant Secretary for Postsecondary Education at the U.S. Department of Education from 2022 to 2025. Prior to that role, he was the chancellor of Indiana University–Purdue University Indianapolis (IUPUI) from 2015 to 2022.

== Early life and education ==
Paydar was born in Tehran, Iran. He earned bachelor's, master's, and doctoral degrees in mechanical engineering from the Syracuse University College of Engineering and Computer Science in 1979, 1981, and 1985, respectively.

== Career ==
Paydar joined IUPUI in 1985 as an assistant professor of mechanical engineering in the School of Engineering and Technology, working in the fields of structural mechanics design, biomechanics, and electronic packaging. He held many positions in the school between 1989 and 2003, including chair of the department and associate dean for graduate programs and academic programs.

From 2004 to 2007, he became vice-chancellor and dean of Indiana University – Purdue University Columbus (IUPUC). From 2007 to 2012, Paydar became the chancellor of Indiana University East. After this, Paydar returned to IUPUI in 2012 and served as executive vice chancellor and chief academic officer, until his appointment as the chancellor.

On November 17, 2015, he was appointed the fifth and final chancellor of IUPUI as well as an executive vice president for Indiana University. After more than 36 years with the university, Paydar retired on February 28, 2022.

In March 2022, President Joe Biden nominated Paydar to serve as the assistant secretary for the Office of Postsecondary Education. He was confirmed on August 4, 2022.

In August 2025, Paydar became president of the Council for Higher Education Accreditation, a national association focused on advocacy for academic quality and the independence of accreditation in the United States.

== Personal life ==
Paydar is married to Niloo who he met while they were both students at Syracuse. The couple has two adult children.
