= List of Delta Phi Alpha chapters =

Delta Phi Alpha is an American collegiate national honorary society for German studies. In the following list of chapters, active chapters are indicated in bold and inactive chapters and institutions are in italics.

Chapter	Charter date and range	Institution	Location	Status	Ref.
**Alpha**	May 27, 1929	Wofford College	Spartanburg, South Carolina	Active	
Beta	December 10, 1929 – 19xx ?	Central Methodist University	Fayette, Missouri	Inactive	
Gamma	June 4, 1929 – 19xx ?	Bates College	Lewiston, Maine	Inactive	
**Delta**	April 4, 1930	Vanderbilt University	Nashville, Tennessee	Active	
**Epsilon**	March 29, 1930	Davidson College	Davidson, North Carolina	Active	
**Zeta**	March 31, 1930	Berea College	Berea, Kentucky	Active	
**Eta**	December 10, 1930	University of Rochester	Rochester, New York	Active	
**Theta**	March 15, 1930	Birmingham–Southern College	Birmingham, Alabama	Active	
**Iota**	December 30, 1930	University of Washington	Seattle, Washington	Active	
**Kappa**	March 30, 1931	Rutgers University–New Brunswick	New Brunswick, New Jersey	Active	
Lambda	February 27, 1931 – 19xx ?	West Virginia University	Morgantown, West Virginia	Inactive	
Mu	April 3, 1931 – 19xx ?	University of Montevallo	Montevallo, Alabama	Inactive	
**Lambda Theta**	April 13, 1931	Ohio Northern University	Ada, Ohio	Active	
**Nu**	May 10, 1931	Wittenberg University	Springfield, Ohio	Active	
**Xi**	May 8, 1931	University of Cincinnati	Cincinnati, Ohio	Active	
**Omicron**	May 17, 1931	Duke University	Durham, North Carolina	Active	
**Pi**	May 27, 1931	University of Illinois Urbana-Champaign	Urbana, Illinois	Active	
**Rho**	December 3, 1931	University of Pennsylvania	Philadelphia, Pennsylvania	Active	
Sigma	February 2, 1932 – 1938	University of South Carolina	Columbia, South Carolina	Inactive	
**Tau**	February 15, 1932	New York University	New York City, New York	Active	
**Upsilon**	March 22, 1932	Case Western Reserve University	Cleveland, Ohio	Active	
**Phi**	March 22, 1932	Bucknell University	Lewisburg, Pennsylvania	Active	
**Chi**	April 20, 1932	University of California, Los Angeles	Los Angeles, California	Active	
**Psi**	March 21, 1932	Washington University in St. Louis	St. Louis County, Missouri.	Active	
**Beta Alpha**	February 27, 1933	Indiana University Bloomington	Bloomington, Indiana	Active	
Beta Beta	February 20, 1933	Cornell University	Ithaca, New York	Inactive	
Beta Gamma	December 29, 1933	Clark University	Worcester, Massachusetts	Inactive	
**Beta Delta**	January 12, 1934	University of Colorado Boulder	Boulder, Colorado	Active	
Beta Epsilon	February 8, 1934 – 19xx ?	University at Buffalo	Buffalo, New York	Inactive	
Beta Zeta	March 12, 1934 – 19xx ?	Southern Methodist University	Dallas, Texas	Inactive	
Beta Eta	April 16, 1934 – 19xx ?	University of Southern California	Los Angeles, California	Inactive	
Beta Theta	December 12, 1934 – 19xx ?	Union College	Schenectady, New York	Inactive	
**Beta Iota**	April 30, 1935	Colgate University	Hamilton, New York	Active	
**Beta Kappa**	November 12, 1935	Miami University	Oxford, Ohio	Active	
Beta Lambda	February 15, 1936 – 19xx ?	University of Oregon	Eugene, Oregon	Inactive	
Beta Mu	April 14, 1936 – 19xx ?	University of Tennessee	Knoxville, Tennessee	Inactive	
**Sigma Epsilon Phi**	June 6, 1936	Hunter College	New York City, New York	Active	
**Beta Nu**	November 25, 1936	University of Iowa	Iowa City, Iowa	Active	
**Beta Xi**	May 19, 1937	Drake University	Des Moines, Iowa	Active	
**Beta Omicron**	June 21, 1937	Capital University	Bexley, Ohio	Active	
**Beta Pi**	December 30, 1937	Baldwin Wallace University	Berea, Ohio	Active	
**Beta Rho**	April 12, 1938	University of North Carolina at Chapel Hill	Chapel Hill, North Carolina	Active	
Beta Sigma	April 18, 1938 – 19xx ?	Emory University	Atlanta, Georgia	Inactive	
**Beta Tau**	March 14, 1939	College of Wooster	Wooster, Ohio	Active	
**Beta Upsilon**	April 22, 1939	University of Louisville	Louisville, Kentucky	Active	
**Beta Phi**	May 10, 1940	Hobart and William Smith Colleges	Geneva, New York	Active	
Beta Chi	1941–19xx?	Upsala College	East Orange, New Jersey	Inactive	(Note: Upsala College closed in 1995.)
**Beta Psi**	January 6, 1942	Albright College	Reading, Pennsylvania	Active	
**Gamma Alpha**	December 10, 1947	Wabash College	Crawfordsville, Indiana	Active	
**Gamma Beta**	January 14, 1948	Dickinson College	Carlisle, Pennsylvania	Active	
Gamma Gamma	February 28, 1948 – 19xx ?	Ohio State University	Columbus, Ohio	Inactive	
**Phi Gamma Phi**	March 31, 1948	Syracuse University	Syracuse, New York	Active	
**Gamma Epsilon**	May 4, 1948	Boston University	Boston, Massachusetts	Active	
**Gamma Zeta**	May 4, 1948	Louisiana State University	Baton Rouge, Louisiana	Active	
**Gamma Eta**	September 10, 1948	Northwestern University	Evanston, Illinois	Active	
**Gamma Theta**	October 18, 1948	University of Oklahoma	Norman, Oklahoma	Active	
**Gamma Iota**	January 18, 1948	Marquette University	Milwaukee, Wisconsin	Active	
**Gamma Kappa**	February 10, 1949 – 19xx ?	Colby College	Waterville, Maine	Active	
Gamma Lambda	January 28, 1949 – 19xx ?	American University	Washington, D.C.	Inactive	
**Gamma Mu**	April 25, 1949	University of Miami	Coral Gables, Florida	Active	
Gamma Nu	May 9, 1949 – 19xx ?	University of Florida	Gainesville, Florida	Inactive	
**Gamma Xi**	April 28, 1949	Rice University	Houston, Texas	Active	
**Gamma Omicron**	May 16, 1949	Temple University	Philadelphia, Pennsylvania	Active	
**Gamma Pi**	May 18, 1949	University of Kansas	Lawrence, Kansas	Active	
Gamma Rho	May 26, 1949 – 19xx ?	Howard University	Washington, D.C.	Inactive	
Gamma Sigma	November 28, 1949 – 19xx ?	Georgetown University	Washington, D.C.	Inactive	
**Gamma Tau**	January 16, 1950	Westminster College	New Wilmington, Pennsylvania	Active	
**Gamma Upsilon**	March 27, 1950	Kent State University	Kent, Ohio	Active	
**Gamma Phi**	April 26, 1950	University of Georgia	Athens, Georgia	Active	
**Gamma Chi**	March 6, 1951	Hope College	Holland, Michigan	Active	
**Gamma Psi**	May 17, 1951	University of Alabama	Tuscaloosa, Alabama	Active	
**Delta Alpha**	January 19, 1952	Denison University	Granville, Ohio	Active	
Delta Beta	March 21, 1952 – 19xx ?	West Virginia State University	Institute, West Virginia	Inactive	
**Delta Gamma**	June 4, 1952	Adelphi University	Garden City, New York	Active	
Delta Delta	August 28, 1953 – 19xx ?	Emmanuel College	Boston, Massachusetts	Inactive	
**Delta Epsilon**	April 20, 1954	Johns Hopkins University	Baltimore, Maryland	Active	
**Delta Zeta**	April 27, 1954	Columbia University	New York City, New York	Active	
**Delta Eta**	March 26, 1955	Wagner College	Staten Island, New York	Active	
**Delta Theta**	May 18, 1955	University of Virginia	Charlottesville, Virginia	Active	
**Delta Iota**	May 25, 1955	Manhattan College	Riverdale, New York	Active	
**Delta Kappa**	May 31, 1955	University of Texas at Austin	Austin, Texas	Active	
**Delta Lambda**	May 4, 1956	Washington & Jefferson College	Washington, Pennsylvania	Active	
**Delta Mu**	May 7, 1956	Michigan State University	East Lansing, Michigan	Active	
**Delta Nu**	May 7, 1956	Pennsylvania State University	University Park, Pennsylvania	Active	
**Delta Xi**	December 7, 1956	Wayne State University	Detroit, Michigan	Active	
**Delta Omicron**	December 22, 1956	Queens College, City University of New York	Flushing, Queens, New York	Active	
**Delta Pi**	April 8, 1957	University of Nebraska–Lincoln	Lincoln, Nebraska	Active	
**Delta Rho**	April 8, 1957	University of Michigan	Ann Arbor, Michigan	Active	
**Delta Sigma**	November 5, 1957	Pomona College	Claremont, California	Active	
**Delta Tau**	March 12, 1957	Ohio University	Athens, Ohio	Active	
**Delta Upsilon**	March 7, 1958	Trinity College	Hartford, Connecticut	Active	
Delta Phi	1958–19xx ?	New York University, University Heights campus	University Heights, Bronx, New York	Inactive	(Note: The NYU Heights campus closed in 1973.)
**Delta Chi**	September 1, 1958	Wake Forest University	Winston-Salem, North Carolina	Active	
**Delta Psi**	January 10, 1959	Concordia University Wisconsin	Mequon, Wisconsin	Active	
**Epsilon Alpha**	February 14, 1959	Thiel College	Greenville, Pennsylvania	Active	
**Epsilon Beta**	May 3, 1959	School of General Studies, Columbia University	New York City, New York	Active	
**Epsilon Gamma**	May 16, 1960	University of Kentucky	Lexington, Kentucky	Active	
**Epsilon Delta**	May 8, 1961	University of Houston	Houston, Texas	Active	
**Epsilon Epsilon**	April 19, 1961	University of Arizona	Tucson, Arizona	Active	
**Epsilon Zeta**	October 13, 1961	Tulane University	New Orleans, Louisiana	Active	
**Epsilon Eta**	December 5, 1961	Muhlenberg College	Allentown, Pennsylvania	Active	
**Epsilon Theta**	April 17, 1962	Brandeis University	Waltham, Massachusetts	Active	
**Epsilon Iota**	April 12, 1962	Brigham Young University	Provo, Utah	Active	
**Epsilon Kappa**	May 23, 1962	University of Delaware	Newark, Delaware	Active	
**Epsilon Lambda**	April 22, 1962	Texas State University	San Marcos, Texas	Active	
**Epsilon Mu**	June 18, 1962	University of Hawaiʻi at Mānoa	Honolulu, Hawaii	Active	
**Epsilon Nu**	June 15, 1962	Georgetown College	Georgetown, Kentucky	Active	
**Epsilon Xi**	July 8, 1962	Texas Tech University	Lubbock, Texas	Active	
**Epsilon Omicron**	October 10, 1962	Mansfield University of Pennsylvania	Mansfield, Pennsylvania	Active	
**Epsilon Pi**	November 21, 1962	University of Pittsburgh	Pittsburgh, Pennsylvania	Active	
**Epsilon Rho**	March 23, 1963	Western Washington University	Bellingham, Washington	Active	
**Epsilon Sigma**	May 5, 1963	Bowling Green State University	Bowling Green, Ohio	Active	
**Epsilon Tau**	November 15, 1963	University of Memphis	Memphis, Tennessee	Active	
**Epsilon Upsilon**	March 24, 1964	Western Kentucky University	Bowling Green, Kentucky	Active	
**Epsilon Phi**	November 5, 1964	Emporia State University	Emporia, Kansas	Active	
**Epsilon Chi**	May 4, 1965	University of California, Riverside	Riverside, California	Active	
**Epsilon Psi**	February 27, 1965	Heidelberg University	Tiffin, Ohio	Active	
**Epsilon Omega**	November 15, 1963	Rhodes College	Memphis, Tennessee	Active	
**Zeta Alpha**	March 4, 1942	Gettysburg College	Gettysburg, Pennsylvania	Active	
**Zeta Beta**	May 12, 1965	Eckerd College	St. Petersburg, Florida	Active	
**Zeta Gamma**	May 7, 1967	University of Wyoming	Laramie, Wyoming	Active	
**Zeta Delta**	May 2, 1965	Ripon College	Ripon, Wisconsin	Active	
**Zeta Epsilon**	November 22, 1966	University of California, Berkeley	Berkeley, California	Active	
**Zeta Zeta**	February 26, 1966	Mississippi State University	Starkville, Mississippi	Active	
**Zeta Eta**	December 28, 1968	University of New Hampshire	Durham, New Hampshire	Active	
**Zeta Theta**	April 23, 1967	San Diego State University	San Diego, California	Active	
**Zeta Iota**	June 15, 1967	Bemidji State University	Bemidji, Minnesota	Active	
**Zeta Kappa**	September 16, 1966	Lehigh University	Bethlehem, Pennsylvania	Active	
**Zeta Lambda**	August 4, 1966	Illinois State University	Normal, Illinois	Active	
**Zeta Mu**	March 15, 1967	Duquesne University	Pittsburgh, Pennsylvania	Active	
**Zeta Nu**	June 1, 1967	Bloomsburg University of Pennsylvania	Bloomsburg, Pennsylvania	Active	
**Zeta Xi**	April 29, 1967	State University of New York at Oswego	Oswego, New York	Active	
**Zeta Omicron**	May 11, 1967	Stetson University	DeLand, Florida	Active	
**Zeta Pi**	May 9, 1967	St. Catherine University	Saint Paul, Minnesota	Active	
**Zeta Rho**	May 9, 1967	University of Mississippi	Oxford, Mississippi	Active	
**Zeta Sigma**	December 6, 1967	George Washington University	Washington, D.C.	Active	
**Zeta Tau**	March 18, 1968	Cornell College	Mount Vernon, Iowa	Active	
**Zeta Upsilon**	April 17, 1968	University of South Dakota	Vermillion, South Dakota	Active	
**Zeta Phi**	April 29, 1968	University of Notre Dame	Notre Dame, Indiana	Active	
**Zeta Chi**	May 15, 1968	University of Illinois Chicago	Chicago, Illinois	Active	
**Zeta Psi**	May 16, 1968	University of Utah	Salt Lake City, Utah	Active	
**Eta Alpha**	November 1, 1968	Lehman College	Bronx, New York	Active	
**Eta Beta**	November 20, 1968	University of Missouri	Columbia, Missouri	Active	
**Eta Gamma**	February 8, 1969	Long Island University	Greenvale, New York	Active	
**Eta Delta**	December 28, 1968	Augustana University	Sioux Falls, South Dakota	Active	
**Eta Epsilon**	December 28, 1968	Northeastern University	Boston, Massachusetts	Active	
**Eta Zeta**	February 19, 1969	Stephen F. Austin State University	Nacogdoches, Texas	Active	
**Eta Eta**	February 19, 1969	California State University, Long Beach	Long Beach, California	Active	
**Eta Theta**	March 21, 1969	State University of New York at Albany	Albany, New York	Active	
**Eta Iota**	April 4, 1969	Georgia Southern University	Statesboro, Georgia	Active	
**Eta Kappa**	June 6, 1969	University of New Orleans	New Orleans, Louisiana	Active	
**Eta Lambda**	November 15, 1969	University of Connecticut	Storrs, Connecticut	Active	
**Eta Mu**	February 27, 1970	East Carolina University	Greenville, North Carolina	Active	
**Eta Nu**	March 23, 1970	Virginia Tech	Blacksburg, Virginia	Active	
**Eta Xi**	March 23, 1970	University of Akron	Akron, Ohio	Active	
**Eta Omicron**	May 15, 1970	St. Lawrence University	Canton, New York	Active	
**Eta Pi**	May 15, 1970	Millersville University of Pennsylvania	Millersville, Pennsylvania	Active	
**Eta Rho**	July 14, 1970	College of William & Mary	Williamsburg, Virginia	Active	
**Eta Sigma**	July 14, 1970	California State University, Sacramento	Sacramento, California	Active	
**Eta Tau**	September 25, 1970	University of Maryland, College Park	College Park, Maryland	Active	
**Eta Upsilon**	February 12, 1971	University of California, Santa Barbara	Santa Barbara, California	Active	
**Eta Phi**	February 12, 1972	Oregon State University	Corvallis, Oregon	Active	
**Eta Chi**	February 12, 1971	Loyola University Chicago	Chicago, Illinois	Active	
**Eta Psi**	April 8, 1971	Texas Southern University	Houston, Texas	Active	
**Theta Alpha**	April 3, 1972	Trinity University	San Antonio, Texas	Active	
**Theta Beta**	April 3, 1972	University of Nebraska Omaha	Omaha, Nebraska	Active	
**Theta Gamma**	April 3, 1972	Southern Illinois University Carbondale	Carbondale, Illinois	Active	
**Theta Delta**	April 2, 1972	Macalester College	Saint Paul, Minnesota	Active	
**Theta Epsilon**	July 13, 1972	Iowa State University	Ames, Iowa	Active	
**Theta Zeta**	September 15, 1972	Ursinus College	Collegeville, Pennsylvania	Active	
**Theta Eta**	November 9, 1972	Eastern Illinois University	Charleston, Illinois	Active	
**Theta Theta**	April 26, 1973	Missouri State University	Springfield, Missouri	Active	
**Theta Iota**	January 16, 1973	Wright State University	Dayton, Ohio	Active	
**Theta Kappa**	March 17, 1973	University of St. Thomas	Houston, Texas	Active	
**Theta Lambda**	April 26, 1973	University of Maine	Orono, Maine	Active	
**Theta Mu**	June 29, 1973	University of California, Davis	Davis, California	Active	
**Theta Nu**	June 29, 1973	Indiana University of Pennsylvania	Indiana, Pennsylvania	Active	
**Theta Xi**	June 29, 1973	Slippery Rock University	Slippery Rock, Pennsylvania	Active	
**Theta Omicron**	September 17, 1973	Youngstown State University	Youngstown, Ohio	Active	
**Theta Pi**	September 17, 1973	University of Texas at Arlington	Arlington, Texas	Active	
**Theta Rho**	December 17, 1973	Rider University	Lawrence Township, New Jersey	Active	
**Theta Sigma**	August 14, 1974	Texas A&M University	College Station, Texas	Active	
**Theta Tau**	November 13, 1974	South Dakota State University	Brookings, South Dakota	Active	
**Theta Upsilon**	December 11, 1974	University of Toledo	Toledo, Ohio	Active	
**Theta Phi**	April 1, 1975	Clemson University	Clemson, South Carolina	Active	
**Theta Chi**	May 27, 1975	Sam Houston State University	Huntsville, Texas	Active	
**Theta Psi**	March 16, 1976	Connecticut College	New London, Connecticut	Active	
**Iota Alpha**	November 11, 1976	Purdue University	West Lafayette, Indiana	Active	
**Iota Beta**	November 29, 1977	University of Maryland, Baltimore County	Catonsville, Maryland	Active	
**Iota Gamma**	February 16, 1978	Loyola University New Orleans	New Orleans, Louisiana	Active	
**Iota Delta**	January 12, 1978	University of Wisconsin–Madison	Madison, Wisconsin	Active	
**Iota Epsilon**	September 9, 1979	University of North Texas	Denton, Texas	Active	
**Iota Zeta**	October 18, 1979	Old Dominion University	Norfolk, Virginia	Active	
**Iota Eta**	October 18, 1979	Florida State University	Tallahassee, Florida	Active	
**Iota Theta**	February 1, 1980	Austin College	Sherman, Texas	Active	
**Iota Iota**	April 8, 1980	University of the Pacific	Stockton, California	Active	
**Iota Kappa**	October 15, 1980	Stony Brook University	Stony Brook, New York	Active	
Iota Lambda	June 6, 1981	Indiana University–Purdue University Indianapolis	Indianapolis, Indiana	Inactive	(Note: In 2024, IUPUI split into two separate universities, Indiana University Indianapolis and Purdue University in Indianapolis.)
**Iota Mu**	March 9, 1983	University of Nevada, Reno	Reno, Nevada	Active	
**Iota Nu**	March 9, 1983	Hillsdale College	Hillsdale, Michigan	Active	
**Iota Xi**	March 9, 1983	University of Arkansas	Fayetteville, Arkansas	Active	
**Iota Omicron**	March 10, 1983	Baylor University	Waco, Texas	Active	
**Iota Pi**	August 1, 1983	College of Charleston	Charleston, South Carolina	Active	
**Iota Rho**	December 8, 1983	Valparaiso University	Valparaiso, Indiana	Active	
**Iota Sigma**	October 17, 1984	Radford University	Radford, Virginia	Active	
**Iota Tau**	October 17, 1984	Central Michigan University	Mount Pleasant, Michigan	Active	
**Iota Upsilon**	May 6, 1985	Virginia Military Institute	Lexington, Virginia	Active	
**Iota Phi**	May 8, 1985	Drew University	Madison, New Jersey	Active	
**Iota Chi**	January 15, 1986	Ithaca College	Ithaca, New York	Active	
**Iota Psi**	January 12, 1987	Longwood University	Farmville, Virginia	Active	
**Kappa Alpha**	December 21, 1987	Kansas State University	Manhattan, Kansas	Active	
**Kappa Beta**	September 26, 1988	Truman State University	Kirksville, Missouri	Active	
**Kappa Gamma**	October 21, 1988	East Tennessee State University	Johnson City, Tennessee	Active	
**Kappa Delta**	December 5, 1988	University of Wisconsin–Eau Claire	Eau Claire, Wisconsin	Active	
**Kappa Epsilon**	February 27, 1989	Cleveland State University	Cleveland, Ohio	Active	
**Kappa Zeta**	April 30, 1990	Auburn University	Auburn, Alabama	Active	
**Kappa Eta**	March 12, 1992	University of North Carolina at Greensboro	Greensboro, North Carolina	Active	
**Kappa Theta**	March 12, 1992	St. Cloud State University	St. Cloud, Minnesota	Active	
**Kappa Iota**	March 12, 1992	Villanova University	Villanova, Pennsylvania	Active	
**Kappa Kappa**	May 16, 1992	Agnes Scott College	Decatur, Georgia	Active	
**Kappa Lambda**	October 19, 1992	Pepperdine University	Malibu, California	Active	
**Kappa Mu**	March 1, 1993	The Citadel	Charleston, South Carolina	Active	
**Kappa Nu**	August 11, 1993	Lafayette College	Easton, Pennsylvania	Active	
**Kappa Xi**	August 2, 1993	Northern Arizona University	Flagstaff, Arizona	Active	
**Kappa Omicron**	March 8, 1994	University of Northern Colorado	Greeley, Colorado	Active	
**Kappa Pi**	October 12, 1994	Ohio Wesleyan University	Delaware, Ohio	Active	
**Kappa Rho**	January 18, 1995	University of Wisconsin–River Falls	River Falls, Wisconsin	Active	
**Kappa Sigma**	March 1, 1995	Sewanee: The University of the South	Sewanee, Tennessee	Active	
**Kappa Tau**	June 26, 1995	Concordia College	Moorhead, Minnesota	Active	
**Kappa Upsilon**	June 26, 1995	Brown University	Providence, Rhode Island	Active	
**Kappa Phi**	November 1, 1995	Saint Louis University	St. Louis, Missouri	Active	
**Kappa Chi**	December 10, 1995	Creighton University	Omaha, Nebraska	Active	
Kappa Psi				Inactive	
**Lambda Alpha**	December 10, 1995	Saint Joseph's University	Philadelphia, Pennsylvania	Active	
**Lambda Beta**	March 16, 1996	Virginia Wesleyan University	Norfolk and Virginia Beach, Virginia	Active	
**Lambda Gamma**	February 10, 1997	Arizona State University	Tempe, Arizona	Active	
**Lambda Delta**	January 22, 1997	John Carroll University	University Heights, Ohio	Active	
**Lambda Epsilon**	March 2, 2000	College of the Holy Cross	Worcester, Massachusetts	Active	
**Lambda Zeta**	January 17, 2001	University of Wisconsin–La Crosse	La Crosse, Wisconsin	Active	
**Lambda Eta**	February 20, 2001	Sweet Briar College	Sweet Briar, Virginia	Active	
Lambda Theta				Inactive	
**Lambda Iota**	April 25, 2002	Mount Holyoke College	South Hadley, Massachusetts	Active	
**Lambda Kappa**	September 9, 2002	Samford University	Birmingham, Alabama	Active	
**Lambda Lambda**	September 9, 2002	Canisius University	Buffalo, New York	Active	
**Lambda Mu**	September 9, 2002	Stanford University	Stanford, California	Active	
**Lambda Nu**	March 7, 2003	Grand Valley State University	Allendale, Michigan	Active	
**Lambda Xi**	March 27, 2003	Webster University	Webster Groves, Missouri	Active	
**Lambda Omicron**	October 20, 2006	Bethany College	Bethany, West Virginia	Active	
**Lambda Pi**	March 28, 2003	Metropolitan State University of Denver	Denver, Colorado	Active	
**Lambda Rho**	May 2, 2003	Smith College	Northampton, Massachusetts	Active	
**Lambda Sigma**	May 21, 2004	North Carolina State University	Raleigh, North Carolina	Active	
**Lambda Tau**	March 23, 2005	University of Wisconsin–Milwaukee	Milwaukee, Wisconsin	Active	
**Lambda Phi**	October 31, 2005	North Central College	Naperville, Illinois	Active	
**Lambda Chi**	January 29, 2006	Washington and Lee University	Lexington, Virginia	Active	
**Lambda Psi**	April 27, 2006	Illinois Wesleyan University	Bloomington, Illinois	Active	
**Sigma Alpha**	November 6, 2006	Whitman College	Walla Walla, Washington	Active	
**Sigma Beta**	September 13, 2007	Georgia State University	Atlanta, Georgia	Active	
Sigma Gamma				Inactive	
**Sigma Delta**	September 17, 2007	University of Wisconsin–Whitewater	Whitewater, Wisconsin	Active	
**Sigma Epsilon**	October 29, 2007	University of Rhode Island	Kingston, Rhode Island	Active	
Sigma Zeta				Inactive	
Sigma Eta				Inactive	
**Sigma Theta**	January 15, 2009	University of California, Santa Cruz	Santa Cruz, California	Active	
**Sigma Iota**	April 8, 2009	Transylvania University	Lexington, Kentucky	Active	
**Sigma Kappa**	March 14, 2009	Luther College	Decorah, Iowa	Active	
**Sigma Lambda**	November 21, 2009	Angelo State University	San Angelo, Texas	Active	
**Sigma Mu**	December 15, 2009	Drury University	Springfield, Missouri	Active	
**Sigma Nu**	December 17, 2009	Texas Christian University	Fort Worth, Texas	Active	
Sigma Xi				Inactive	
**Sigma Omicron**	March 19, 2010	Kutztown University of Pennsylvania	Kutztown, Pennsylvania	Active	
**Sigma Pi**	April 14, 2010	Middlebury College	Middlebury, Vermont	Active	
**Sigma Rho**	May 17, 2010	Roger Williams University	Bristol, Rhode Island	Active	
Sigma Sigma				Inactive	
**Sigma Tau**	March 9, 2011	University of Colorado Colorado Springs	Colorado Springs, Colorado	Active	
**Sigma Upsilon**	April 25, 2011	University of Arkansas at Little Rock	Little Rock, Arkansas	Active	
**Sigma Phi**	September 5, 2011	Knox College	Galesburg, Illinois	Active	
**Sigma Chi**	October 12, 2011	Catholic University of America	Washington, D.C.	Active	
**Sigma Psi**	April 13, 2012	Butler University	Indianapolis, Indiana	Active	
**Tau Alpha**	June 12, 2012	University of California, Irvine	Irvine, California	Active	
**Tau Beta**	July 17, 2012	Augustana College	Rock Island, Illinois	Active	
**Tau Gamma**	August 22, 2013	Franklin & Marshall College	Lancaster, Pennsylvania	Active	
**Tau Delta**	August 27, 2013	Doane University	Crete, Nebraska	Active	
**Tau Epsilon**	September 23, 2013	Aquinas College	Grand Rapids, Michigan	Active	
**Tau Zeta**	September 23, 2013	University of North Carolina at Asheville	Asheville, North Carolina	Active	
**Tau Eta**	December 1, 2013	Montclair State University	Montclair, New Jersey	Active	
Tau Theta				Inactive	
**Tau Iota**	June 10, 2014	Georgetown College	Georgetown, Kentucky	Active	
**Tau Kappa**	September 17, 2014	University of Nevada, Las Vegas	Paradise, Nevada	Active	
**Tau Lambda**	October 2, 2014	Oberlin College	Oberlin, Ohio	Active	
**Tau Mu**	November 9, 2014	Swarthmore College	Swarthmore, Pennsylvania	Active	
**Tau Nu**	February 2, 2015	Albion College	Albion, Michigan	Active	
**Tau Xi**	May 15, 2015	Appalachian State University	Boone, North Carolina	Active	
**Tau Omicron**	July 13, 2015	University of St. Thomas	Saint Paul, Minnesota	Active	
**Tau Pi**	October 14, 2015	Oklahoma State University–Stillwater	Stillwater, Oklahoma	Active	
**Tau Rho**	October 15, 2015	Rochester Institute of Technology	Henrietta, New York	Active	
**Tau Sigma**	November 2, 2015	New Mexico State University	Las Cruces, New Mexico	Active	
**Tau Tau**	January 18, 2016	University of Portland	Portland, Oregon	Active	
**Tau Upsilon**	February 17, 2016	Christopher Newport University	Newport News, Virginia	Active	
Tau Phi				Inactive	
**Tau Chi**	April 1, 2016	Ball State University	Muncie, Indiana	Active	
**Tau Psi**	October 27, 2016	University of Southern Mississippi	Hattiesburg, Mississippi	Active	
**Tau Omega**	June 29, 2016	State University of New York at New Paltz	New Paltz, New York	Active	
**Upsilon Alpha**	August 10, 2016	Kennesaw State University	Kennesaw, Georgia	Active	
**Upsilon Beta**	August 23, 2016	DePaul University	Chicago, Illinois	Active	
**Upsilon Gamma**	September 7, 2016	St. Olaf College	Northfield, Minnesota	Active	
**Upsilon Delta**	October 27, 2016	Skidmore College	Saratoga Springs, New York	Active	
**Upsilon Epsilon**	August 26, 2018	State University of New York at Geneseo	Geneseo, New York	Active	
**Upsilon Zeta**	February 20, 2017	Xavier University	Cincinnati, Ohio	Active	
**Upsilon Eta**	March 31, 2017	University of Montana	Missoula, Montana	Active	
**Upsilon Theta**	October 18, 2019	Western Michigan University	Kalamazoo, Michigan	Active	
**Upsilon Iota**	April 26, 2017	Guilford College	Greensboro, North Carolina	Active	
**Upsilon Kappa**	May 22, 2017	Virginia Commonwealth University	Richmond, Virginia	Active	
**Upsilon Lambda**	September 26, 2017	Georgia Tech	Atlanta, Georgia	Active	
**Upsilon Mu**	September 28, 2017	James Madison University	Harrisonburg, Virginia	Active	
**Upsilon Nu**	October 5, 2017	Kalamazoo College	Kalamazoo, Michigan	Active	
**Upsilon Xi**	February 14, 2018	Marian University	Indianapolis, Indiana	Active	
**Upsilon Omicron**	March 27, 2018	Elon University	Elon, North Carolina	Active	
**Upsilon Pi**	May 1, 2018	University of Minnesota Morris	Morris, Minnesota	Active	
**Upsilon Rho**	April 19, 2017	University of Richmond	Richmond, Virginia	Active	
**Upsilon Sigma**	April 10, 2018	Chapman University	Orange, California	Active	
**Upsilon Tau**	April 25, 2019	Furman University	Greenville, South Carolina	Active	
**Upsilon Upsilon**	March 15, 2020	University of Wisconsin–Green Bay	Green Bay, Wisconsin	Active	
**Upsilon Psi**	October 22, 2018	California State University, Chico	Chico, California	Active	
**Upsilon Chi**	January 27, 2016	University of Chicago	Chicago, Illinois	Active	
**Upsilon Phi**	April 10, 2019	University of North Alabama	Florence, Alabama	Active	
**Phi Alpha**	January 21, 2021	Hofstra University	Hempstead, New York	Active	
**Phi Beta**	November 28, 2021	Hanover College	Hanover, Indiana	Active	
