= Anne H. Hopkins =

American academic administrator

4th President of the University of North Florida
- In office October 1, 1999 – 2002
- Preceded by: Adam W. Herbert
- Succeeded by: John Delaney

Personal details
- Born: 1942 New York City
- Died: July 4, 2021 (aged 79) Jacksonville, Florida
- Education: Syracuse University (BA, MA, PhD)

Anne Houghton Hopkins (1942 – July 4, 2021) is an American academic and university administrator. She served as the 4th president of the University of North Florida from 1999 to 2002.

== Early life ==
Hopkins was born in New York City to William Emmet Houghton and Marian Cadle Houghton. She earned her bachelor's, master's and doctoral degrees in political science from Syracuse University's Maxwell School of Citizenship and Public Affairs.

== Career ==
Hopkins began her long career in higher education in 1968 as an assistant professor of political science at the Hobart and William Smith Colleges in Geneva, New York, where she would become the department chair. She later served as vice provost at the University of Tennessee at Knoxville (1974), vice president of arts, sciences and engineering at the University of Minnesota System in 1990, and provost and executive vice president for academic affairs at Miami University in Oxford, Ohio, where she also served as acting president from December 1995 to July 1996.

As the first female president of the University of North Florida, Hopkins focused on increasing academic excellence through initiatives such as expanding student learning opportunities, the student honors program, faculty-mentored research projects, and professional development, and adding new academic offerings on campus. After leaving the presidency, she served as a political science professor at the university for many additional years. Hopkins launched university's first capital campaign, called "Access to Excellence," which raised over $100 million and became the largest philanthropic effort in Jacksonville's history.

She also served on the board of the American Council on Education.

Political offices
Preceded by Adam Herbert	President of University of North Florida; 1999–2002	Succeeded by John Delaney
