= Latha Ramchand =

American academic, author

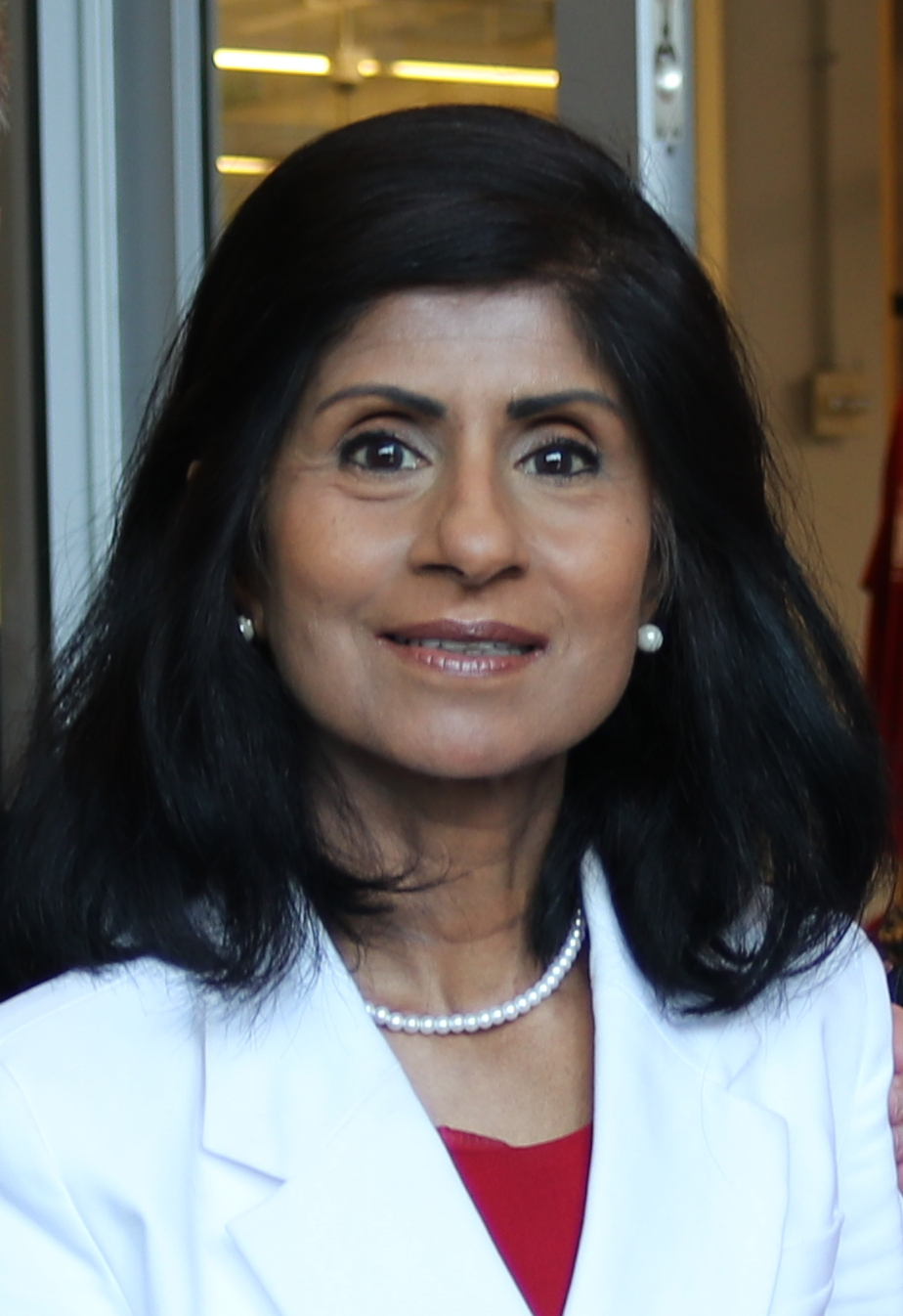
- Ramchand in 2024

1st Chancellor of Indiana University Indianapolis
- Incumbent
- Assumed office July 1, 2024
- President: Pamela Whitten
- Preceded by: self

6th Chancellor of Indiana University–Purdue University Indianapolis
- In office February 12, 2024 – June 30, 2024
- President: Pamela Whitten
- Preceded by: Carol Anne Murdoch-Kinch (interim); Nasser Paydar
- Succeeded by: self

Personal details
- Born: India
- Education: University of Mumbai (BS, MS); Northwestern University (PhD)
- Occupations: Chancellor, Executive Vice President, Professor of Finance

Academic work
- Discipline: International Finance
- Institutions: University of Houston; University of Missouri; Indiana University–Purdue University Indianapolis; Indiana University Indianapolis

Latha Ramchand is an American academic and an international and corporate finance professional expert. She is a professor of finance and has taught at the graduate level. Ramchand is the Chancellor and Executive Vice President of Indiana University Indianapolis (IU Indianapolis).

== Early life and education ==
Ramchand is a native of Thiruvananthapuram, Kerala, but was raised in Mumbai. She attended University of Mumbai, where she received her master's and bachelor's degrees in economics. She then received her Ph.D. in finance in 1993 from Northwestern University.

== Career ==
Upon graduating with her PhD in finance, she began working for a bank. From 2011 to 2018, Ramchand served as the dean of the C.T. Baer College of Business at the University of Houston. She spearheaded initiatives and programming that connected the university to its community and promoted diversity and inclusion. To support women attending business school, she launched the Working Families Agenda which provided research that organizations can use to establish equitable workplace policies. She created a program called Sustainable Urban Renewal, that connected students with entrepreneurs with the goal of reducing poverty.

In 2018, she focused on improving enrollment and program rankings through the establishment of a new strategy at University of Missouri. During her time there she was appointed Executive Vice Chancellor and Provost.

In 2024, she was appointed Chancellor and Executive Vice President of Indiana University Indianapolis (IU Indianapolis). Her appointment came in the midst of the separation of IU Indianapolis from Purdue University which together were once the IUPUI campus.

== Personal life ==
Ramchand married her husband, Ram, prior to moving to the U.S.

== Selected works ==
- Ramchand, L.; Susmel, R. (1998). "Volatility and cross correlation across major stock markets". Journal of Empirical Finance. 5 (4): 397–416. doi:10.1016/S0927-5398(98)00003-6.
- Ramchand, L.; Susmel, R. (1998). "Variances and covariances of international stock returns: The international capital asset pricing model revisited". Journal of International Financial Markets, Institutions and Money. 8 (1): 39–57. doi:10.1016/S1042-4431(98)00023-7.
- Ramchand, L.; Sethapakdi, P. (2000). "Changes in systematic risk following global equity issuance". Journal of Banking & Finance. 24 (9): 1491–1514. doi:10.1016/S0378-4266(99)00094-1.
- Chaplinsky, S.; Ramchand, L. (2000). "The Impact of Global Equity Offerings". The Journal of Finance. 55 (6): 2767–2789. doi:10.1111/0022-1082.00306.
- Chaplinsky, S.; Ramchand, L. (2004). "The Impact of SEC Rule 144A on Corporate Debt Issuance by International Firms". The Journal of Business. 77 (4): 1073–1098. doi:10.1086/422441. JSTOR 10.1086/422441.
