= Gert-Jan de Vreede =

Dutch-American academic administrator and professor

Interim Dean of the USF Muma College of Business
- Incumbent
- Assumed office August 1, 2022
- Preceded by: Moez Limayem

Personal details
- Education: Delft University of Technology (PhD, MS)

Gert-Jan "GJ" de Vreede is a Dutch-American researcher, academic administrator and professor currently serving as the interim Dean of the University of South Florida Muma College of Business. He assumed his role on August 1, 2022, succeeding Moez Limayem, who left to become president of the University of North Florida.

== Career ==
Before his current role, de Vreede was a professor in the college's School of Information Systems and Management since 2015 and served as interim dean of the College of Business at USF's Sarasota-Manatee campus during the 2018–19 academic year. Prior to joining USF, he spent 13 years teaching at the University of Nebraska–Lincoln.

De Vreede also served as the Associate Dean for Research & Professional Programs at the Muma College of Business from 2019–2022.

He received both his PhD and MS in Information Systems from Delft University of Technology in the Netherlands.

== Research ==
De Vreede's research interests include artificial intelligence, crowdsourcing, collaboration engineering, and creativity. He has been cited over 12,000 times and has received over $6.5 million in funding as a (co)-principal investigator. He is recognized as a top 2% researcher worldwide by a Stanford University study and has an h-index of 55, placing him in the top 100 in his discipline. His work has been widely published and cited in various journals.

He is also the co-founder of the scholarly discipline of collaboration engineering and the co-inventor of the thinkLets design pattern language. He serves as the editor in chief of the Group Decision & Negotiation journal.

=== Selected publications ===
- Topi, H.; Kaiser, K. M.; Sipior, J. C.; Valacich, J. S.; Nunamaker Jr, J. F.; de Vreede, G. J.; Wright, R. (2010). "IS 2010: Curriculum Guidelines for Undergraduate Degree Programs in Information Systems". Communications of the Association for Information Systems. 26. doi:10.17705/1CAIS.02618.
- Briggs, R. O.; De Vreede, G. J.; Nunamaker Jr, J. F. (2003). "Collaboration engineering with ThinkLets to pursue sustained success with group support systems". Journal of Management Information Systems. 19 (4): 31–64. doi:10.1080/07421222.2003.11045743. S2CID 219306016.
- Seeber, I.; Bittner, E.; Briggs, R. O.; De Vreede, T.; De Vreede, G. J.; Elkins, A.; Söllner, M. (2020). "Machines as teammates: A research agenda on AI in team collaboration". Information & Management. 57 (2) 103174. doi:10.1016/j.im.2019.103174. S2CID 198484097.
