= List of University of North Florida people =

This is a list of alumni and presidents of the University of North Florida.

== Alumni ==
Will Ludwigsen

- Janet Adkins, former member of the Florida House of Representatives
- Bryan Baker, pitcher for the Tampa Bay Rays
- Coreen Carroll, cannabis chef
- Patrick Faber, deputy prime minister and minister of education in Belize
- Drayton Florence, former NFL player
- Nat Glover, former sheriff of Jacksonville, Florida
- James Haley, modern pentathlete at the 1992 Summer Olympics
- Todd Haley, NFL coach, including head coach for the Kansas City Chiefs and offensive coordinator for the Arizona Cardinals, Pittsburgh Steelers, and Cleveland Browns
- Rebecca Heflin, romance novelist (pseudonym of Dianne Farb); attorney
- Kasper Hjulmand, manager of the Denmark national football team
- Betty Holzendorf, former member of the Florida Senate
- Yoanna House, fashion model and winner of America's Next Top Model
- Will Ludwigsen, writer of horror, mystery, and science fiction
- Greg Mullins, pitcher for the Milwaukee Brewers
- Kevin Phelan, golfer
- Sara Walsh, ESPN broadcaster
- Mike Wood, pitcher for the Texas Rangers
- Anita Zucker, former CEO of the Hudson's Bay Company

== Presidents ==
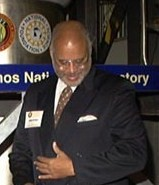
Adam Herbert

	Presidents of UNF	Years as president
1	Thomas G. Carpenter	(1969–1980)
2	Andrew A. Robinson	(1980–1982) (interim)
3	Curtis L. McCray	(1982–1988)
4	Roy E. McTarnaghan	(1988–1989) (interim)
5	Adam W. Herbert	(1989–1998)
6	E. K. Fretwell	(1998) (interim)
7	Anne H. Hopkins	(1998–2002)
8	A. David Kline	(2002–2003) (interim)
9	John Delaney	(2003–2018)
9	David Szymanski	(2018–2021)
10	Pamela Chally	(2021–2022) (interim)
11	Moez Limayem	(2022–2026)
12	Angela Garcia Falconetti	(2026–present) (interim)
