= CUDI =

The University Corporation for Internet Development (Spanish: Corporación Universitaria para el Desarrollo de Internet; CUDI) is a non-profit consortium to build and operate a Mexican high-performance backbone network for research and education, sometimes called Internet-2 for Mexico.

== Overview ==
Established in 2000, the RedCUDI (CUDI Network) backbone had, during many years, a capacity of 155 Megabits per second (STM-1) using ATM, recently 10 Gigabits links, with 3 international links to Abilene Network, Gigabit links to the California Research and Education Network (CalREN) managed by CENIC, and one Mbit link to RedCLARA. Over 200 members institutions (research centers, universities) participate in RedCUDI, some corporate and affiliate institutions, in all of the 31 states of Mexico. Its purpose has been to develop and deploy advanced network applications and technologies such as IPv6, IP multicasting, quality of service, Software-defined networking and other innovations.
