= Indiana University Columbus =

University in Columbus, Indiana, U.S.

- Former names: Indiana University–Purdue University Indianapolis at Columbus (1970–1994); Indiana University–Purdue University Columbus (1994–2024)
- Type: Public regional baccalaureate college
- Established: 1970
- Parent institution: Indiana University Indianapolis
- Academic affiliations: Space-grant
- Vice-Chancellor: Reinhold Hill
- Academic staff: 174
- Students: 1,051 (Fall 2022)
- Location: Columbus, Indiana, United States; 39.253155°N 85.902314°W
- Campus: 15 acres (6.1 ha)
- Colors: Cream & Crimson
- Nickname: Crimson Pride
- Sporting affiliations: NAIA – River States
- Mascot: Lion
- Website: columbus.iu.edu

Indiana University Columbus (IU Columbus) is a public university in Columbus, Indiana, United States, a regional campus of Indiana University serving south central Indiana. Prior to July 2024, it was known as Indiana University–Purdue University Columbus, and was a joint collaboration between both Indiana University and Purdue University Systems.

On July 1, 2024, following the split of Indiana University–Purdue University Indianapolis into Indiana University Indianapolis and Purdue University in Indianapolis, IUPUC was rebranded into Indiana University Columbus following the withdrawal of Purdue University programs.

== History ==
IU Columbus was founded in 1970 as an extension of Indiana University–Purdue University Indianapolis (IUPUI) and was originally known as Indiana University–Purdue University Indianapolis at Columbus. Originally, the extension had no single campus, instead offering classes in various locations throughout Columbus. An old airport building was converted to the first centralized campus building for IUPUC, but was soon renovated for academic use in 1985. In 1994, the chancellor of IUPUI renamed IUPUI Columbus to Indiana University–Purdue University Columbus.

IUPUC's first vice-chancellor, Paul Bippen, served in this capacity from 1977 until his retirement in 2003, when he was replaced by Nasser Paydar. In 2007, Jay Howard was named interim vice-chancellor. In 2009, Marwan Wafa was named the new vice-chancellor. IUPUC's most-senior executive title is vice-chancellor. The current vice-chancellor is Reinhold Hill.

On August 12, 2022, the boards of trustees of both Purdue and IU announced that IUPUI would split into two separate universities. The split was finalized on July 1, 2024. According to Andrew Klein, the then-interim chancellor of IUPUI, IUPUC would be renamed to Indiana University Columbus and would continue to be a regional education center administered through IU Indianapolis after the split was finalized. Two degree programs at the school, biology and mechanical engineering, were offered by Purdue; IU Columbus continues to grant biology degrees through Indiana University, but mechanical engineering is no longer offered by the school following the split.

Purdue University continues to maintain its Polytechnic Institute campus in Columbus as it is administered through Purdue's main campus in West Lafayette and was never a part of IUPUC.

== Academics ==
Students can complete several Indiana University (IU) bachelor's and master's degrees in their entirety at Columbus campus. Students can also complete a substantial number of classes toward degrees not offered at IU Columbus and then transfer to IU Indianapolis or another IU campus. The university's divisions include:

- Division of Business
- Division of Education
- Division of Liberal Arts
- Division of Health Sciences
- Division of Science
- University College
- Honors Program

IU Columbus predominantly serves students in Bartholomew, Brown, Decatur, Jackson, Jefferson, Jennings, Johnson, Ripley and Shelby counties, as well as other areas in the largely rural south central and southeastern portion of Indiana. IU Columbus also offers off-campus classes at the community learning center in Seymour.

IUPUC was one of the first academic institutions to innovate a cross-institutional and cross-discipline tutoring program through partnerships with Ivy Tech Community College and the Purdue Statewide Technology program (Purdue Polytechnic). The Academic Resource Center (ARC) was a one-of-a-kind, one-stop tutoring operation for math, science, writing, public speaking, Spanish, and basic technology.

== Vice chancellors ==
The following people have led the Columbus campus of Indiana University (or its predecessors) since 1970 as Vice Chancellor and Dean:

No.	Portrait	Director	Took office	Left office	Notes
1		Emerson Gilbert	1970	1977	
2		Paul Bippen	1977	2003	
3		Nasser Paydar	2004	2007	
–		Jay Howard	July 2007	August 31, 2009	Interim
4		Marwan Wafa	September 1, 2009	June 30, 2015	
–		Laurence Richards	July 1, 2015	June 30, 2016	Interim
5		Reinhold Hill	July 1, 2016	present	

== Athletics ==
The IU Columbus athletic teams are called the Crimson Pride. The university is a member of the National Association of Intercollegiate Athletics (NAIA), primarily competing as a member of the River States Conference (RSC) since the 2023–24 school year. The Crimson Pride previously competed as an NAIA Independent within the Continental Athletic Conference during its inaugural debut season within the NAIA in 2022–23.

IU Columbus competes in nine intercollegiate varsity sports: Men's sports include baseball, basketball, cross country and soccer; while women's sports include basketball, cross country, soccer, softball and volleyball.
