= John Delaney (Florida politician) =

American politician and academic administrator

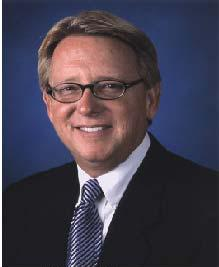

President of Flagler College
- Incumbent
- Assumed office July 2021; Interim: July–October 2021
- Preceded by: Joe Joyner

5th President of the University of North Florida
- In office 2003–2018
- Preceded by: Anne H. Hopkins
- Succeeded by: David M. Szymanski

Chancellor of the State University System of Florida
- Interim; February 2009 – September 14, 2009
- Preceded by: Mark B. Rosenberg
- Succeeded by: Frank Brogan

5th Mayor of Jacksonville
- In office July 1, 1995 – July 1, 2003
- Preceded by: Ed Austin
- Succeeded by: John Peyton

Personal details
- Born: John Adrian Delaney; June 29, 1956 (age 70) Lansing, Michigan, U.S.
- Party: Republican
- Spouse: Gena Delaney
- Education: University of Florida (BA, JD)

John Adrian Delaney (born June 29, 1956) is an American lawyer, politician, and university and college President. He served as mayor of Jacksonville, Florida, from 1995 to 2003, and as the president of the University of North Florida from 2003 to 2018. In 2021, he was named President of Flagler College after a few months as Interim. He is a member of the Republican Party.

== Early life ==
Delaney was born in Lansing, Michigan, and raised in Cincinnati, Ohio. His family moved to Jacksonville when he was sixteen. His father, Jim, was a mid-level executive with General Motors, retiring from GM in 1982, and retiring again in the mid-1990’s after being later-rehired by GM. His mother, Mary Anne (Langius) was a school teacher, retiring after John and his brothers were born. Her father, Adrian Nelson (Gus) Langius was the long time State of Michigan architect (FAIA) and state building director. Jim and Mary Anne went to high school together, but did not start dating until sophomores at college. Mary Anne transferred from the University of Michigan to Jim's Michigan State University, where both graduated.

John has two younger brothers, James Langius (Gus,) a retired long time budget analyst and auditor for the state of Florida, and Joe, a crime analyst for the Jacksonville Sheriff's Office.

He graduated from Terry Parker High School in 1974. He was captain of the debate team, was a regional champion and was offered a number of debate scholarships to colleges/universities, including to the University of Florida. He declined the scholarships to focus on his studies.

At the University of Florida, he joined Delta Upsilon fraternity, graduated in 3 years and received a B.A. in 1977. He did some post-baccalaureate work before starting law school in 1978. In 1981, he received a J.D. from the University of Florida Levin College of Law, passing the bar the same year. He later received an honorary doctorate from Edward Waters College, now Edward Waters University.

Delaney and his wife Gena met in 1979 and married in 1980. She graduated from UF, then went on after their first two children were born to obtain a Nursing degree. She worked at St Vincent's Hospital. They reside in Neptune Beach, a town on a barrier island off the coast of the mainland of Jacksonville. Their house is the home Gena grew up in. They have four children: Bill (Katie), Adrian (Will) Milford, Meg (Drake) Skinner and Jimmy (Payton.) John and Gena have six grandchildren. They also helped raise a niece (Rebecca Keeney (Maldonado) (Husband Jorge) and a nephew Nathan Keeney (Paola) when Gena's oldest sister died in a car crash in 1987. Rebecca and Nathan have three children total. Bill is a published author and co-owner of the blog, The Jaxon and of the local magazine, Edible. Meg and Drake now reside in Denver, Colorado with their two children. Gena retired from nursing when John was elected Mayor to care for their children, and to also help care for her mother. (Both of Gena's parents lived with the Delaney's until their deaths in 1985 and 1997, respectively.)

Delaney graduated law school and passed the Florida Bar exam in 1981 and was hired by then State Attorney Ed Austin, becoming Austin's chief assistant state attorney in 1985. He was the youngest Chief Assistant of the 20 judicial circuits in the state at the time, and still was when he left the courthouse in 1991. Austin became a second father figure and a role model to Delaney and to many of the thousands who worked for Austin. Austin was one of the most influential figures in Jacksonville history. When Austin was elected mayor of Jacksonville in 1991, Delaney became the city's general counsel for two years, and served as Austin's chief of staff for two years. Delaney ran for mayor himself in 1995 when Austin declined to seek a second term. Austin endorsed Delaney.

== Mayor of Jacksonville ==
In 1995, Delaney defeated former mayors Jake Godbold and Tommy Hazouri to become Mayor of the City of Jacksonville, Florida, serving two consecutive terms from 1995 to 2003. The City of Jacksonville and County of Duval were merged into a consolidated city/county government in the 1960’s, retaining the moniker of Jacksonville. The city is the largest in land area in the continental United States, and approximately the 12th largest city in population in the country.

He was the first Republican elected to the position since 1888. Other than when the city and county were consolidated into a unified city/county government, he is the only Jacksonville mayor to run without opposition since the city was formed in the 1820’s. That election was in 1999, when he ran unopposed for his second term. He was succeeded by John Peyton in July 2003.

In the same 1995 election, Nat Glover, a Democrat, was elected sheriff, the first African-American sheriff elected in Florida since Reconstruction. Glover, despite being massively outspent, defeated the two major party endorsed candidates in the jungle primary (where all candidates, regardless of party affiliation) and did not have to campaign in a run off. Delaney and Glover were acquaintances as Glover was a senior Jacksonville Sheriff Office director while Delaney was chief assistant state attorney. The two became very close personal friends, and each supported each other's initiatives throughout their tenure. Glover later joined Delaney at UNF as a special advisor for several years before Glover became president of Edward Waters College, now Edward Waters University. The two remain personally close, and Glover remains both popular and influential in local politics.

During his mayoral term, Delaney was noted for launching the Better Jacksonville Plan, a massive, multi-billion dollar package of projects for municipal improvements funded by a referendum. The plan called for spending $2.25 billion (approximately $5.5b in 2020 dollars.) The referendum passed 58–42%. This paid for roads, bridges, water and sewer expansion, environmental clean up, land acquisition for parks, bike paths, neighborhood and regional libraries, and four new downtown buildings: the Baseball Grounds, a Triple A baseball facility; a new arena; new county courthouse, and new central library. He also started the Preservation Project, a series of land acquisitions for parks. As a result, Jacksonville has the largest park system of any American city, approximately 100 square miles.

He cut the tax rate by 10% over his term while able to enhance services through efficiencies, privatization, and outsourcing. When combined with his predecessor Mayor Ed Austin's term, the headcount of civilian (non-police or firefighter) city employees were cut by between 1/4 and 1/3 between 1991 and 2003 depending on the methodology used to measure headcount. There were no lay-offs during his tenure.

He was one of the most popular mayors in Jacksonville's history, enjoying consistently high approval ratings and running unopposed for his second election. He worked to be bi-partisan and inclusive, leaving office with approval ratings for Republicans and Democrats, and for white and African Americans above 80%.

He was awarded an honorary Doctorate of Humane Letters by the historically Black Edward Waters College, now Edward Waters University.

In 2003, he received the President's Conservation Achievement Award from the Nature Conservancy for the Preservation Project.

== University of North Florida ==
Delaney was appointed president of the University of North Florida (UNF) in 2003. During his tenure the university saw a surge of building projects, including a new student union and other facilities. Under his leadership, the university launched an initiative to identify and strengthen its top "flagship" programs. Since 2005, six programs have been established as flagships: nursing, transportation and logistics, international business, coastal biology, nutrition and dietetics, and music.

The endowment tripled during his tenure, and he roughly doubled the building space with new construction, and renovated much of the remaining.

Further, academic admission standards increased dramatically, with entering freshmen with approximately a 4.3 grade point average and a 1300 SAT score.

He retired from UNF in May 2018. The university's student union facility was renamed the John A. Delaney Student Union by the UNF Board in his honor. The faculty recommended and the board approved naming him president emeritus. Only the founding president, Tom Carpenter, has been given that distinction.

In October 2008, John Delaney was named interim chancellor of the State University System of Florida, remaining UNF president while doing double duty. He took over for Mark B. Rosenberg who had resigned to return to Florida International University. He served for the 2009 legislative session, and was not paid any compensation. In October 2009, Frank Brogan became the new chancellor of the State University System.

=== Post 2018 ===
Delaney joined the Rogers Towers Law Firm and the Fiorentino Group, a business consulting and governmental lobbying firm. He remains Of Counsel to both firms while serving as president for Flagler College.

=== Flagler College ===
In November, 2020, Flagler named Delaney as interim president, starting on the retirement of President Joe Joyner in July 2021. In October, 2021, the college asked John to remove the Interim label, and become the "permanent" president.

Political offices
Preceded by Ed Austin Jr.	Mayor of Jacksonville; 1995–2003	Succeeded by John Peyton
Academic offices
Preceded by Mark B. Rosenberg	Interim Chancellor of the State University System of Florida; 2009–2009	Succeeded by Frank Brogan
Preceded by Anne H. Hopkins	President of University of North Florida; 2003–2018	Succeeded by David Szymanski
