= Stella F. Thayer =

Stella F. Thayer (born December 27, 1940, in Tampa, Florida) is a vice-chair and former president of the National Museum of Racing and Hall of Fame.

== Biography ==
Thayer, president of Tampa Bay Downs, succeeded John T. von Stade, becoming the museum's ninth president in 2005. She had been a museum trustee since 1994, previously serving as an executive vice-president before being elected president.

The daughter of Chester Howell Ferguson, for whom the University of South Florida’s College of Business Administration building is named, Thayer has been active in thoroughbred racing and has been in ownership with her brother, Howell Ferguson, of Tampa Bay Downs since 1986. She previously served as president of the Thoroughbred Racing Association for a two-year term, beginning in 1999. She is also a member of the Lykes Family of Florida that wholly owns Lykes Bros. Inc with 337000 acres of land holdings (526 sq miles) including cattle ranching, forestry, sod, sugarcane farms, insurance, and ecoassets.

Thayer graduated in 1962 from Hollins College in Virginia and earned her law degree in 1965 at Columbia Law School. A member of the Florida, New Jersey and New York bars, she is an attorney and shareholder in the Tampa-based law firm of Macfarlane, Ferguson and McMullen where she is engaged in the practice of Estate Planning, Probate and Corporate Law. Before it was acquired by British Aerospace, Thayer was the chairman of the board and a director of Reflectone, a manufacturer of full flight simulators.

Among her many civic and governmental activities in Tampa, Thayer is a member of the board of trustees of the Tampa General Hospital Foundation, and a member of the board of trustees of the University of South Florida Foundation. She is the former chairman of the Hillsborough County Aviation Authority, the governing board of Tampa International Airport and is the former chairman of the Hillsborough County Hospital Authority. She, along with Dick Corbett and Bob Blanchard, purchased the Tampa Bay Rowdies soccer club from George W. Strawbridge, Jr. in 1983. In 1986 Dick's wife, Cornelia Corbett, became sole owner of the team.

Thayer resides in Thonotosassa, Florida. She was married to banker Bronson Thayer until his death in 2016. They have one daughter, Susannah.

Through holding companies, she and brother Howell own an entire island in Pine Island Sound, Mondongo Island, off the coast of west Florida, just north of Useppa Island.

In 2023 Thayer was inducted into the National Museum of Racing and Hall of Fame as a Pillar of the Turf for her contributions to thoroughbred racing.
