= Bronson Thayer =

A. Bronson Thayer (September 2, 1939 – December 24, 2016) was the chairman of the board and past chief executive officer of Bay Cities Bank. He was born in Mineola, New York. From 1974 to 1983 he was executive vice president and chief financial officer of Lykes Brothers in Tampa and vice president of Dominick & Dominick, Inc. from 1969 to 1972 in New York.

Thayer became executive vice president of Lykes, and chair of their executive committee, in 1989.

Thayer was a graduate of Harvard College and received an MBA from New York University in 1967. He was married to Stella F. Thayer.

Bronson Thayer died on December 24, 2016, at the age of 77.
