= Michael McRobbie =

Australian–American computer scientist and university administrator

Michael McRobbie AO
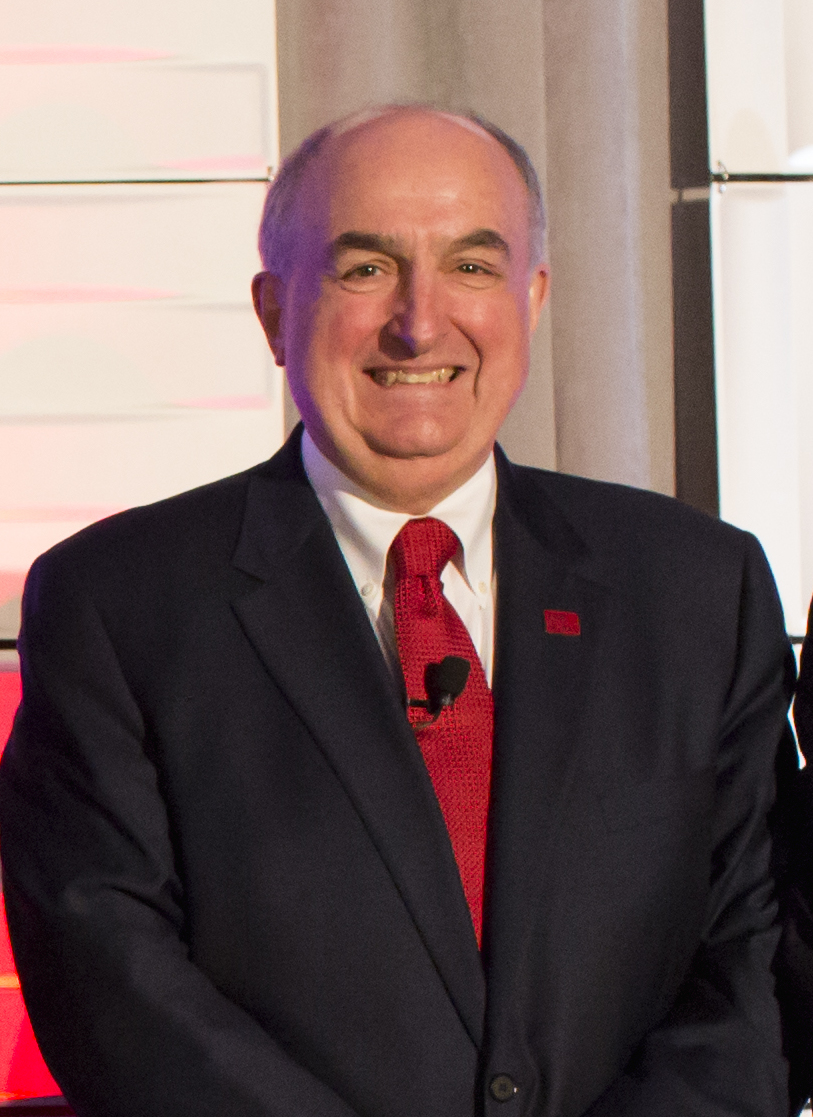
- McRobbie in 2016

3rd University Chancellor of Indiana University
- Incumbent
- Assumed office July 1, 2021
- Preceded by: Kenneth Gros Louis

18th President of Indiana University
- In office July 1, 2007 – June 30, 2021
- Preceded by: Adam Herbert
- Succeeded by: Pamela Whitten

Personal details
- Born: Michael Alexander McRobbie; October 11, 1950 (age 76) Melbourne, Victoria, Australia
- Spouses: Andrea Shirley Gibson (1973–2003, died); Laurie Burns (2005–present)
- Education: University of Queensland; Australian National University
- Profession: University administrator
- Website: universitychancellor.iu.edu

Academic background
- Thesis: A proof theoretical investigation of relevant and modal logics (1979)
- Doctoral advisor: Robert K. Meyer; Richard Routley

Academic work
- Discipline: Philosophy
- Sub-discipline: Artificial intelligence, automated theorem proving
- Institutions: La Trobe University; University of Melbourne; Australian National University

Michael Alexander McRobbie AO (born October 11, 1950) is an Australian–American computer scientist and university administrator. He served as the 18th president of Indiana University from 2007 to 2021. Upon stepping down from the IU presidency, McRobbie was replaced by Pamela Whitten, who became the 19th president of Indiana University on July 1, 2021. On July 1, 2021, he assumed the titles of university chancellor, president emeritus and university professor. He is the third person to serve as university chancellor in its more than 200-year-old history.

== Early life and education ==
McRobbie is an Australian. Born on October 11, 1950, in Melbourne, Victoria, he grew up in Gold Coast, Queensland. He graduated with a B.Sc. with First Class Honours from the University of Queensland in 1974, and with a Ph.D. from the Australian National University in 1979. His early work was in philosophy, artificial intelligence and automated theorem proving.

== Career ==
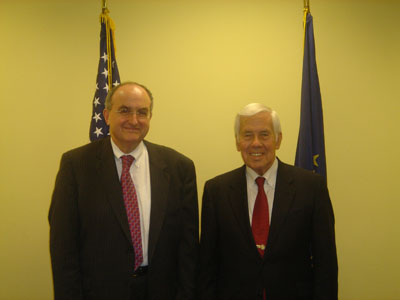
McRobbie with U.S. Senator Richard Lugar in 2007

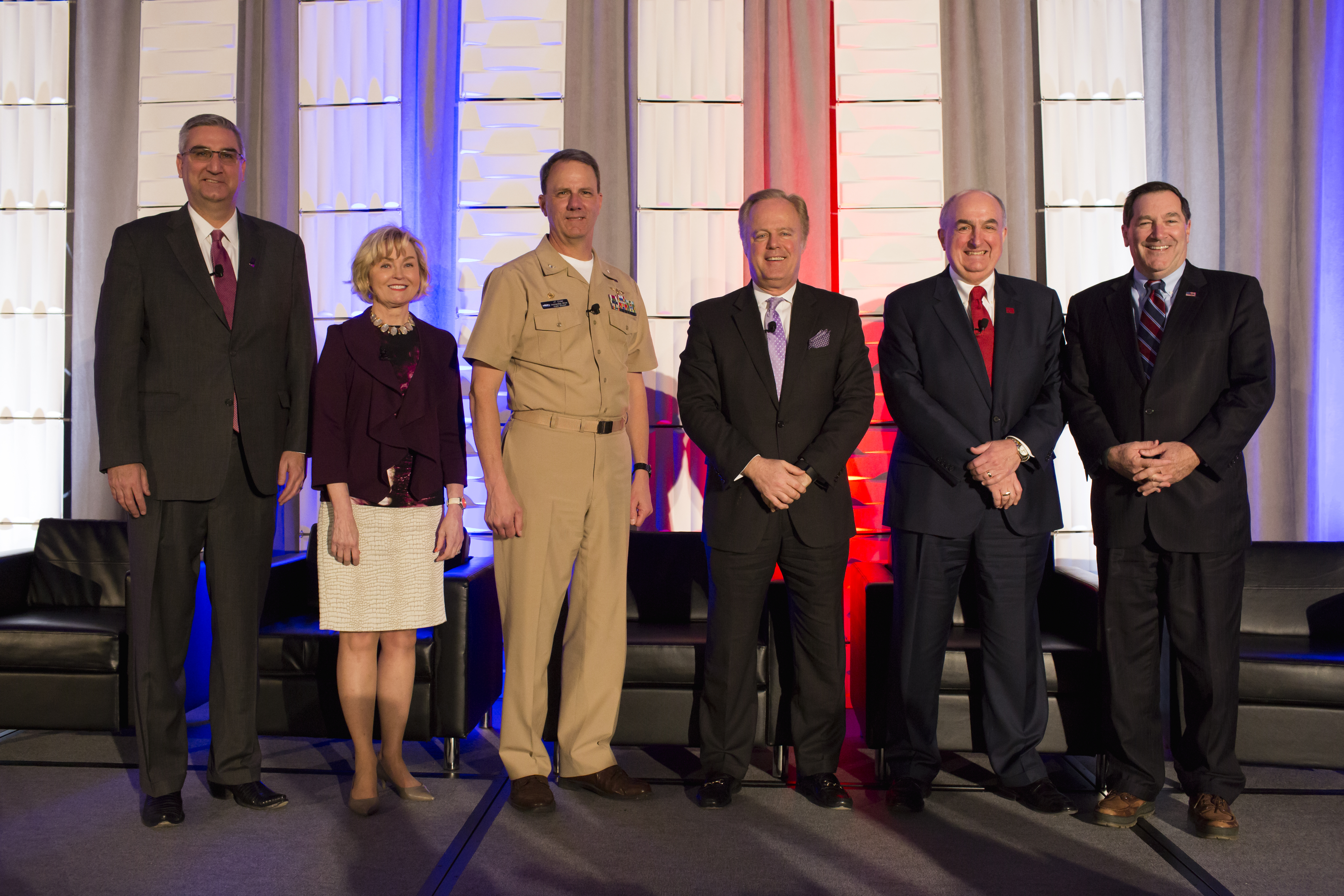
McRobbie at the Southwest Central Indiana Region Grant Announcement in 2016

After a postdoctoral fellowship in philosophy, he founded an automated reasoning project, the ANU Centre for Information Science Research and the Cooperative Research Centre for Advanced Computational Systems.

McRobbie was a 1988 Fulbright Scholar in Computer Science from The Australian National University to the Argonne National Laboratory. From 1990 through 1996 he was a professor at the Australian National University. He had a growing interest in international research collaborations. In 1996 he and Kilnam Chon proposed what became Asia Pacific Advanced Network at a symposium held at Tsukuba, Japan.

In 1997 he became the first vice president for information technology at Indiana University. The network operations center for the Abilene Network was established at IU under his direction, and the Pervasive Technology Laboratories were established with a $29.9 million grant from the Lilly Endowment in 1999.

McRobbie was principal investigator of a project sponsored by the US National Science Foundation to connect US and Asian national research and education networks called TransPAC. The state-funded $5.3 million I-Light project connected all campuses of the IU system with fiber-optic communications (further expanded in 2010). In 2003 he became the vice president for research of IU. In 2005, the TransPAC2 project was funded as a follow-on to TransPAC. He was chairman of the steering committee for the Indiana Metabolomics and Cytomics Initiative (METACyt), which was the largest outside funded project in the history of Indiana University Bloomington.

McRobbie served as interim provost and vice president of academic affairs of the Bloomington campus in 2006. He increased external funding by securing millions of dollars in grants for life science initiatives. On a July 2006 trip through China he established a cooperative research program with Tsinghua University in Beijing.

By September 2006, the then president of Indiana University, Adam Herbert, announced he wanted to leave office before July 2008. On March 1, 2007, McRobbie was selected as IU's 18th president and took office on July 1, 2007. He served on the board of directors for ChaCha (the Indiana-based search engine). Some press were critical of a deal that used IU librarians as "guides", although McRobbie resigned from the board before becoming president of the university.

McRobbie has served on the board of trustees for Internet2 since 2009, and was named chair of the board starting in 2012. In 2012 he announced a new supercomputer called Big Red II at IU. Although other universities operate larger computers, by some measures this Cray XK7 was expected to be the largest for use by a single US university and not a consortium or national resource. The original Big Red computer was installed in 2006.

On August 14, 2020, McRobbie announced that he planned to retire at the end of June 2021 after 14 years as the head of the university and that a search committee was being formed to find his replacement.

== Personal life ==
While still an undergraduate at The University of Queensland, McRobbie married Brisbane native Andrea Gibson in 1973. They had three children together. She died from brain cancer in 2003. A fellowship was named in her memory.

McRobbie has three children and three stepchildren. His second wife, Laurie Burns McRobbie, was born in Michigan and worked as a technologist for 20 years. Both of them had been widowed before they married in 2005.

Laurie McRobbie was the executive director of member and partner relations for Internet2, and an adjunct faculty member in IU's School of Informatics.

After living in Indiana for 13 years, McRobbie became a US citizen in October 2010 while still retaining his original Australian citizenship.

== Honors and awards ==
McRobbie was made a Sagamore of the Wabash, the highest honor the state can bestow, in 2007 by Indiana Governor Mitch Daniels. That same year he received an honorary degree from the University of Queensland. In 2008 he received an honorary degree from Sungkyunkwan University in South Korea, and one from the Australian National University in 2010. Also in 2010 he was named an officer of the Order of Australia.

Academic offices
Preceded by Adam Herbert	18th President of Indiana University; 2007 — 2021	Succeeded by Pamela Whitten
Vacant Title last held by Kenneth Gros Louis	3rd Chancellor of Indiana University; 2021 — present	Incumbent
