= Chester Howell Ferguson =

American businessman

Chester H. Ferguson
- Born: Chester Howell Ferguson; July 1, 1908; Americus, Georgia
- Died: March 3, 1983 (aged 74); Tampa, Florida
- Education: Mercer University; University of Florida
- Known for: designated a Great Floridian
- Spouse: Louise Lykes Ferguson
- Children: Stella F. Thayer & Howell Ferguson

Chester Howell Ferguson (July 1, 1908 – March 3, 1983) was a prominent Tampa lawyer, banker and businessman whose record of community service was long and distinguished.

== Early life, family and education ==
He was born in Americus, Georgia where his father was a farmer. The family moved to Wauchula, Florida for truck farming. Ferguson graduated from Hardee High School in 1926, attended Mercer University and the University of Alabama for his bachelor's degree, then matriculated Law School at the University of Florida. While in Gainesville, he had membership in Phi Delta Theta social fraternity, Phi Delta Phi legal honor society, Omicron Delta Kappa honor society, Florida Blue Key leadership honor society and Scabbard and Blade military honor society. While in college, Ferguson displayed outstanding legal talents.

== Career ==
Ferguson moved to Tampa in 1930 during the depression. He was the first public defender (unpaid) in that city before joining the law firm that became MacFarlane, Ferguson, Allison & Kelly at $15/week. He was made a partner there after five years. Ferguson became counsel for the Lykes Brothers businesses, and subsequently married Louise Lykes, daughter of Dr. Howell Tyson Lykes in 1939. Dr. Lykes was a physician-turned-rancher who shipped cattle via Schooner to Cuba where he made megabucks during the 1880s. Under Ferguson's guidance, the Lykes Brothers, with business in cattle, shipping, citrus & meat processing and packing, real estate, banking, energy/utilities, electronics and steel. prospered. In the late 1960s he was named CEO and chairman of the board for the billion-dollar conglomerate.

Ferguson was also chairman and CEO of First Florida Banks in Tampa. The bank and their 144 offices were acquired by Barnett Banks in 1992.

== Civic contributions ==
Ferguson believed that lawyers should be active in community life. He was one of Tampa's leading citizens, helping the city to grow, revitalize the downtown and become a major financial center and shipping port. He was a director or officer for numerous major corporations.

== Education ==
Ferguson highly valued education. He spoke at a Law School Reunion saying, "History shows that governments change, decay and fail, but the processes of learning go on forever." When the Florida Board of Regents replaced the Florida Board of Control in 1965, Ferguson was a principal organizer and served from 1965 to 1979, including two terms as chairman. During that time, the State University System of Florida grew from three to nine universities. . The Muma College of Business at the University of South Florida includes Ferguson Hall. It is called "the bunker" because part of the building is underground and contains the largest auditorium on campus. It was named after Chester Howell Ferguson.

== Legacy and honors ==
He was a Fellow at both the American College of Probate Counsel and the American College of Trial Lawyers. He received the UF Law Center Trustees' Award for outstanding contributions to his alma mater and the legal profession in 1982. The American Scottish Foundation bestowed the Wallace Award for contributions to the well-being of this country. His financial contributions include the establishment of the Chester H. Ferguson Scholarship at the Levin College of Law to an outstanding freshman and a donation to the Building Campaign at the Law Center.

He was named a Great Floridian by the Florida Department of State, an honor extended to individuals who made major contributions to the progress and welfare of the state of Florida.

== Death ==
Ferguson suffered a heart attack on February 8th and fell into a coma. He died without regaining consciousness on March 3, 1983. He was 74 years old. His wife Louise lived another 33 years, passing on October 5, 2016.
