= Corporation for Education Network Initiatives in California =

American nonprofit corporation

- Formation: 1997
- Type: Not-for-profit
- Purpose: Educational network
- Headquarters: La Mirada, California
- Website: www.cenic.org
- ASN: 2153

The Corporation for Education Network Initiatives in California (CENIC /ˈsiːnɪk/ SEE-nik) is a nonprofit corporation formed in 1997 to provide high-performance, high-bandwidth networking services to California universities and research institutions. Through this corporation, representatives from all of California's K-20 public education combine their networking resources toward the operation, deployment, and maintenance of the California Research and Education Network, or CalREN. Today, CalREN operates over 8,000 miles of fiber optic cable and serves more than 20 million users.

== History ==
Beginning in the mid 1980s, research universities were served by a National Science Foundation (NSF) funded network, NSFNet. This funding ended, however, in 1995, as the NSF believed that the newly established commercial Internet could meet the needs of these institutions.

A model for wide-area networking began to emerge in the early 1990s, separating regional network infrastructure from national or international “backbone” infrastructure. Regional networks would connect to one or more “Internet exchange points” where traffic would be sent to or received from one or more backbone networks. When NSFNet ceased operation, this new network structure carried both research and commercial traffic.

Researchers at major universities soon began to complain that service from the commercial Internet was inadequate. This led to discussion of a separate network, funded by and for research universities, and the ultimate establishment of Internet2. The Internet2 backbone would have only two connection points in California.

At the same time, officials at the University of California, USC, Caltech, Stanford, and the California State University system (CSU) began discussing how to connect their institutions to the proposed new Internet2 network. They recognized that the key to a comprehensive information technology strategy was the development of a cohesive and seamless statewide, high-speed, advanced service network. In 1996, the University of California Office of the President, on behalf of these universities, applied for NSF funding to establish, with matching funds, a California network to provide this capacity.

When the consortium learned it would receive a grant award, its members created a not-for-profit organization independent of the founding institutions to build and manage the network. The Corporation for Education Network Initiatives in California (CENIC) was created in 1997. CENIC’s California Research and Education Network (CalREN) first became operational in 1998, providing connections to Internet2 for the University of California campuses, Stanford, Caltech, USC, and CSU campuses. Initially, the CSU sites linked to CENIC’s network through interconnection between CalREN and 4CNet, the CSU network that already provided Internet services to all CSU campuses and the California Community Colleges.

In 2000, the State of California provided funding to the University of California for the Digital California Project, which allowed K-12 schools to connect to CalREN. The University of California contracted with CENIC to develop and implement the project, with county offices of education as the primary connection points.

Next, CENIC began to design a network architecture to support all educational institutions. In 2002, the CENIC board of directors decided to obtain fiber leases for the major north-south portion of the CalREN network, putting in place an architecture that continues to the present day. CENIC has continued to add more leased fiber to its network, and today CalREN operates over 8,000 miles of fiber.

Between 2003 and 2005, CSU campuses and California Community Colleges were migrated from 4CNet to CalREN. In 2004, the Legislature shifted funding for K-12 connectivity from the University of California to the California Department of Education. This legislation also created the California K-12 High Speed Network (K12HSN) program to coordinate K-12’s participation in CENIC. Network and Internet services are currently provided to the 86 K-12 connection locations, most of which serve as aggregation node sites. These connections provide network access for 79% (7,946) of schools, 87% (861) of school districts, and 100% (58) of county offices of education in California. It is estimated that CalREN serves nearly 4.8 million K-12 public school students. In 2005, the California Community Colleges joined CENIC separately from CSU, with membership equal to that of the University of California, CSU, and the K-12 system.

In 2013, Governor Brown and the California State Legislature funded an initiative to help California’s nearly 1,200 public libraries receive high-speed broadband service. The California State Library joined CENIC on behalf of the public libraries and contracted with Califa, a non-profit library membership consortium representing library jurisdictions in California, to administer the program. That work is well underway, with almost 80% of library jurisdictions now connecting to CalREN.

Over the years, affiliated educational, governmental, medical research, and cultural institutions throughout the state have been brought into the fold, creating the country's largest statewide research and education network, which now serves more than 20 million users.

== Participants ==
Charter institutions connected to the CalREN backbone include:

- All 10 campuses of the University of California system, all UC medical centers, and the UC Office of the President
- All 23 campuses of the California State University system, offsite centers, and the CSU Chancellor's Office
- All 114 campuses of the California Community College system and off-site centers
- All County Offices of Education in California's K-12 system and via those offices, over 8,000 K-12 schools
- Other universities including
  - The California Institute of Technology
  - Stanford University
  - The University of Southern California
  - The Naval Postgraduate School
- California State Libraries
  - San Joaquin Valley Library System
- California Arts and Cultural Institutions
  - Exploratorium
  - SF Jazz
  - California Academy of Sciences

Other non-charter participants include:

- The Nevada System of Higher Education
- The NASA Ames Research Center
- The University of San Francisco
- The University of San Diego
- Pepperdine University
- National University

== The California Research and Education Network ==
CalREN is a three-tiered network consisting of a statewide optical backbone to which schools and other institutions in California connect at Gigabit speeds via leased circuits obtained from telecom carriers or fiber-optic cable. These tiers include:

- CalREN-DC (Digital California): This tier includes services for all K-20 California research and education users. Backbone speed for this tier is 100 Gbit/s.
- CalREN-HPR (High-Performance Research): This tier includes leading-edge services for large application users. Backbone speed for this tier is 100 Gbit/s.
- CalREN-XD (Experimental and Developmental): This tier consists of a set of network resources that can be built to order to facilitate bleeding-edge services for network and other researchers. This tier has no set maximum bandwidth.

All three network tiers operate independently. This enables network and other researchers on the XD and HPR tiers to push the boundaries of network research and performance without impacting performance for the other tiers.

== Network peering ==
CENIC also engages in networking peering relationships, in particular Pacific Wave (a joint project between CENIC and the Pacific Northwest Gigapop, the University of Southern California, and the University of Washington), which provides peering facilities along the Pacific coast of the United States. Pacific Wave participants include networks in Australia, Canada, Japan, Korea, Qatar, Taiwan, Singapore, and the United States.

CENIC engaged in peering via the TransitRail national-level peering structure. TransitRail has been merged with Internet2's Commodity Peering Service.

== CENIC and other networks ==
CalREN also connects to the California Telehealth Network, ESnet (Energy Sciences Network), Internet2, CUDI (the Corporación Universitaria para el Desarrollo de Internet), the Mexican high-bandwidth research and education network, redCLARA (the Cooperación Latino-Americana de Redes Avanzadas), and CAnet4 (the Canadian optical research and education network, managed by CANARIE).

CENIC is also a member of the Global Lambda Integrated Facility, which promotes optical networking to support grid computing.

== K12 High Speed Network ==
CalREN was expanded by funding through the state of California and its Digital California Project to include K-12 public education. When funding sources changed, the K-12 portion became the K-12 High Speed Network (K12HSN), which is managed by the Imperial County Office of Education.
