= Moez Limayem =

American academic administrator (born 1963)

9th President of the University of South Florida
- Incumbent
- Assumed office January 2026
- Preceded by: Rhea Law

7th President of the University of North Florida
- In office August 2022 – December 2025
- Preceded by: David Syzmanski

Dean of USF Muma College of Business
- In office August 2012 – August 2022
- Preceded by: Robert E. Forsythe
- Succeeded by: Gert-Jan de Vreede

Personal details
- Born: Tunisia
- Citizenship: United States; Tunisia
- Education: University of Minnesota (MBA, PhD); University of Tunis (BS)

Moez Limayem is a Tunisian–American academic administrator, scientist and scholar who is the current President of the University of South Florida. He assumed the role of the ninth president in 2026. Prior to this role, he served as the seventh president of the University of North Florida from 2022 to 2025.

Previously, Limayem served as the Lynn Pippenger Dean of the Muma College of Business at the University of South Florida since 2012. During his deanship at USF, he raised over $126 million in donations for the college.

In September 2025, a presidential search committee announced Limayem as the sole finalist as the ninth president of USF. On October 21, the unanimous decision by the Board of Trustees of his official selection was announced. His nomination was confirmed by the Florida Board of Governors on December 12, 2025, with expectation to assume presidency in 2026.

== Early life and education ==
Limayem was born in Tunisia and is proficient in six languages. He earned his undergraduate degree in Computer Science from the University of Tunis, Tunisia. He later received an MBA and a PhD in Information Systems from the University of Minnesota, where he started his teaching career.

== Career ==
Limayem became the seventh President of the University of North Florida in August 2022. Before UNF, he spent a decade as Dean of the Muma College of Business at the University of South Florida, starting in 2012. Before USF, Limayem was part of the Sam M. Walton College of Business at the University of Arkansas, where he held the position of associate dean for research and graduate programs. He also has taught at renowned universities, including Université Laval in Canada, City University of Hong Kong and HEC Lausanne, Université de Lausanne in Switzerland, before landing at University of South Florida in 2012. A founding member of the Mediterranean School of Business in Tunis, he has been teaching there as a visiting professor since 2004

=== Selected publications ===
- How habit limits the predictive power of intention: The case of information systems continuance
- Straub, Detmar; Limayem, Moez; Karahanna-Evaristo, Elena (1 Aug 1995). ""Measuring System Usage: Implications for IS Theory Testing"". Management Science. 41 (8): 1328–1342. doi:10.1287/mnsc.41.8.1328 – via INFORMS.
- Limayem, Moez; Khalifa, Mohamed; Frini, Anissa (July 2000). "What makes consumers buy from Internet? A longitudinal study of online shopping". IEEE Transactions on Systems, Man, and Cybernetics - Part A: Systems and Humans. 30 (4): 421–432. Bibcode:2000ITSMA..30..421L. doi:10.1109/3468.852436.

== Personal life ==
He is married to Alya Limayem, a biology professor.
