= Asia Pacific Advanced Network =

- Abbreviation: APAN
- Formation: 3 June 1997, incorporated on 8 August 2009 in Hong Kong
- Legal status: Company limited by guarantee
- Purpose: Research Networking
- Headquarters: Kuala Lumpur, Malaysia
- Region served: Asia-Pacific
- Chairman: Shinji Shimojo
- Main organ: Council of Primary Members
- Website: www.apan.net

The Asia-Pacific Advanced Network (APAN) is a not-for-profit association of Asia-Pacific national research and education networks (NRENs) incorporated in Hong Kong as a company limited by guarantee. The organisation was originally formed on 3 June 1997 and was incorporated on 8 August 2009.

== Purpose ==
The objectives of APAN are

- to coordinate and promote network technology developments and advances in network-based applications and services across the Asia-Pacific region;
- to provide a forum for user communities to come together with network engineers to help promote and exploit opportunities to enhance research and education in disciplines that are relevant to the member economies;
- to hold meetings, workshops and conferences relating to network technology, the development of advanced communication services, and the exploitation of these, resulting in compelling new applications;
- to arrange and organize education and training workshops, and to operate a fellowship programme to support and develop the next generation of network engineers and network leaders in the Asia-Pacific region;
- to work closely with relevant organizations, institutions, groups and individuals around the world to further enhance the adoption of and research into advanced network applications and technologies;
- together with peer organizations in North and South America, Europe and Africa, coordinate the building of global infrastructure that will transform the way that education and research is undertaken, leading to improvements in societal benefit.

Full membership of APAN is open to NRENs (one per country or economy). Non-voting membership is available for persons, organisations or corporations that have common interests in the objectives of APAN.

Similar organisations elsewhere in the world include GÉANT, UbuntuNet Alliance, WACREN (West and Central African Research and Education Network), ASREN (Arab States Research and Education Network), and CLARA (Cooperación Latino Americana de Redes Avanzadas).

== History ==
The necessity for high-end internet for researchers in the Asia-Pacific region was recognized at the APEC Symposium in Tsukuba, Japan in March 1996, and then at APII Test-bed Forum in Seoul, Korea in June 1996, the creation of APAN was proposed. Meetings were held with the attendance of the delegates from North America or Europe for one year, and the APAN Consortium was formed under a Memorandum of Understanding in June 1997 to promote advanced research in networking technologies and the development of high-performance broadband applications.

APAN is designed to offer a high-performance network for research and development on advanced next-generation applications and services. APAN provides an advanced networking environment for the research and education community in the Asia-Pacific region, and promotes global collaboration.

== Conference ==
Twice a year, APAN runs a conference for academic networkers called the APAN Meetings. Each conference is hosted by a member NREN and attended by around 200 delegates from academic backgrounds including networking specialists and managers from networking and research organisations.

=== Conference locations ===
- Seoul (August 1996)
- Tokyo (November 1996)
- Tokyo (June 1997)
- Singapore (October 1997)
- Tsukuba (March 1998)
- Seoul (July 1998)
- Osaka (February 1999)
- Canberra (September 1999)
- Tsukuba (February 2000)
- Beijing (August 2000)
- Honolulu (February 2001)
- Penang (August 2001)
- Phuket (January 2002)
- Shanghai (August 2002)
- Fukuoka (January 2003)
- Busan (August 2003)
- Honolulu (January 2004)
- Cairns (July 2004)
- Bangkok (January 2005)
- Taipei (August 2005)
- Tokyo (January 2006)
- Singapore (July 2006)
- Manila (January 2007)
- Xi'an (August 2007)
- Honolulu (January 2008)
- Queenstown (August 2008)
- Kaohsiung (March 2009)
- Kuala Lumpur (July 2009)
- Sydney (February 2010)
- Hanoi (August 2010)
- Hong Kong (February 2011)
- New Delhi (August 2011)
- Chiang Mai (February 2012)
- Colombo (August 2012)
- Honolulu (January 2013)
- Daejeon (August 2013)
- Bandung (January 2014)
- Taipei (August 2014)
- Fukuoka (March 2015)
- Kuala Lumpur (August 2015)
- Manila (January 2016)
- Hong Kong (August 2016)
- New Delhi (February 2017)
- Dalian (August 2017)
- Singapore (March 2018)
- Auckland (August 2018)
- Daejeon (February 2019)
- Putrajaya, KL (August 2019)
- Nepal (March 2020)
- Hong Kong (August 2020)
- Pakistan (February 2021)
- Jogjakarta (August 2021)
- Bangladesh (March 2022)
- Jinan (August 2022)
- Kathmandu (March 2023)
- Colombo (August 2023)
- Bangkok (January 2024)
- Islamabad (August 2024)
- Yokohama (March 2025)
- Hong Kong (July 2025)
- Dhaka (January 2026)
