= Will Ludwigsen =

American writer

- Will Ludwigsen
- Born: June 27, 1973 (age 53); Wilmington, Delaware
- Occupation: Writer
- Writing career
- Language: English
- Genres: Horror, Science Fiction, Fantasy, Mystery

Will Ludwigsen is an American writer of horror, mystery, and science fiction. His work has appeared in a number of magazines including Alfred Hitchcock's Mystery Magazine, Cemetery Dance, Weird Tales, and Strange Horizons. He has also published three collections, including the highly praised In Search Of and Others.

== Writing career ==
Ludwigsen earned his bachelor's degree in English from the University of Florida in 1994, followed by a Masters in the same discipline at the University of North Florida in 2005, and later, an MFA from University of Southern Maine. He is also a 2006 graduate of the Clarion East Writers Workshop. He is currently adjunct faculty at University of North Florida, where he teaches Creative Writing among other courses.

Ludwigesen's 2013 short story collection, In Search of and Others, was nominated for a Shirley Jackson Award for best single author collection. The book was well received, with starred reviews from both Kirkus Reviews and Publishers Weekly, which called it a "hauntingly beautiful collection." The title comes from the documentary television series In Search Of..., which was devoted to "mysterious phenomena" and hosted by Leonard Nimoy.

== Bibliography ==
=== Short fiction ===
Collections

- Cthulhu fhtagn, baby! and other cosmic insolence (Lethe Press, 2006)
- In search of and others (Lethe Press, 2013)
