= Muma College of Business =

Coordinates: 28.0545°N 82.4131°W

The Muma College of Business (formerly the USF College of Business Administration) is the University of South Florida's business school. It conferred its first degree in 1963 and was named for businessman and alumnus Les Muma in 2014. There are currently approximately 5,000 undergraduate students and 2,000 graduate students enrolled.

USF Muma offers undergraduate majors in Accountancy & Analytics, Advertising, Business Analytics and Information Systems, Entrepreneurship and Innovation (A Rising National Program), Finance, Global Business, Hospitality Management, Information Assurance and Cybersecurity Management, Management, Marketing, Personal Financial Planning, Risk Management and Insurance, and Supply Chain Management.

Muma offers graduate majors in Accountancy & Analytics, Business Analytics and Information Systems, Finance, Information Assurance and Cybersecurity Management, Management, Marketing, Supply Chain Management, Entrepreneurship and Applied Technologies, Business Administration, Sports and Entertainment Management, and Big Data Analytics.[3]

Muma classes are offered on all three of USF's campuses: Tampa, St. Petersburg, and Sarasota–Manatee.

The dean is David Blackwell, preceded by Gert-Jan de Vreede

The Muma College of Business includes Ferguson Hall. It is called "the bunker" because part of the building is underground. It was named after Chester Howell Ferguson.
