= Indiana University Indianapolis =

Public research university in Indianapolis, Indiana, US

- Student Newspapers: The Indiana Commons, The Campus Citizen
- Type: Public research university
- Established: July 1, 2024; 2 years ago
- Parent institution: Indiana University
- Academic affiliations: Space-grant
- Endowment: $1.15 billion (2020)
- Chancellor: Latha Ramchand
- Faculty: Over 2,500
- Students: 29,390 (Fall 2020)
- Undergraduates: 20,441 (Fall 2020)
- Postgraduates: 8,171 (Fall 2020)
- Location: Indianapolis, Indiana, United States; 39°46′26″N 86°10′35″W
- Campus: Urban: 536 acres (217 ha)
- Colors: Cream and crimson
- Nickname: Jaguars
- Sporting affiliations: NCAA Division I – Horizon League
- Mascots: Jawz, Jinx, and Jazzy
- Sports teams: 16 varsity teams
- Website: indianapolis.iu.edu

Indiana University Indianapolis (IU Indianapolis or IU Indy) is an urban public research university in Indianapolis, Indiana, United States, and is a core campus of the Indiana University system. It was founded on July 1, 2024, after its predecessor institution, Indiana University–Purdue University Indianapolis (IUPUI), split into IU Indianapolis and Purdue University in Indianapolis. It is Indiana's primary urban research and academic health sciences institution. It is located in downtown Indianapolis along the White River and Fall Creek.

Among more than 550 degree programs, the university hosts the primary campuses for both the Indiana University School of Medicine, the largest medical school in the country, and the Indiana University School of Dentistry, the only dental school in the state. Also present is the IU McKinney School of Law, one of two IU law schools, as well as the Indianapolis campus of the IU Kelley School of Business. In February 2025, IU Indy's Carnegie Classification was elevated to "R1: Doctoral Universities – very high research spending and doctorate production".

The IU Indy Jaguars compete in the NCAA's NCAA Division I in the Horizon League. Several athletics venues are located on the campus, including the IU Michael A. Carroll Track & Soccer Stadium and Indiana University Natatorium, the largest indoor pool in the United States with a seating capacity of 4,700. IU Indy opened the new James T. Morris Arena, a 4,500-seat athletics center for basketball, volleyball, and other uses, in October 2026.

On August 12, 2022, the boards of trustees of both Purdue and IU announced that IUPUI would split into two separate universities, with completion of the split set to be finished by the fall 2024 semester. The School of Science, which was administered by Purdue during the IUPUI era, is now part of IU with the exception of the computer science department. The School of Engineering and Technology continues to be administered by Purdue with the exception of the department of music arts and technology, which joined the IU School of Art and Design. The remaining Purdue programs in Indianapolis now operate as fully integrated extensions of their West Lafayette counterparts.

IU added new computer science programs to its School of Informatics, Computing and Engineering, and Purdue intends to open a branch of its applied research institute on or near the IUPUI campus. IU is providing certain administrative services to both academic organizations.

The student-run newspaper of the former IU Indianapolis extension campus, the Onomatopoeia, and that of the former Purdue University Indianapolis extension campus, the Component, merged in 1971 to form The Sagamore, which operated until 2009. Archives are available online. That publication was replaced by The Campus Citizen in 2011. A second student newspaper known as The Indiana Commons was formed in 2023 and is part of the Collegiate Network.

== Chancellors ==
The following persons had led the former IUPUI campus from 1968 to 2024 and later the Indiana University Indianapolis campus since 2024 as chancellor:

No.	Image	Chancellor	Term start	Term end	Refs.
1		Maynard K. Hine (Note: Hine was first IUPUI chancellor.)	November 1, 1968	August 31, 1973	
2		Glenn Irwin Jr.	September 1, 1973	August 31, 1986	
3		Gerald L. Bepko (Note: Bepko was also interim IU system president in early 2003.)	September 1, 1986	May 31, 2003	
4		Charles R. Bantz	June 1, 2003	August 15, 2015	
5		Nasser H. Paydar	August 16, 2015	February 28, 2022	
Interim		Andrew Klein	March 1, 2022	June 18, 2023	
Interim		Carol Anne Murdoch-Kinch	June 19, 2023	February 11, 2024	
6		Latha Ramchand (Note: Ramchand was last IUPUI chancellor and first IUI chancellor.)	February 12, 2024	present	

Table notes:
