= Adam Herbert =

American academic administrator (born 1943)

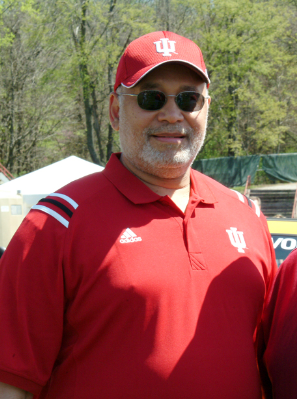
- Herbert in 2005

17th President of Indiana University
- In office 2003–2007
- Preceded by: Myles Brand
- Succeeded by: Michael McRobbie

6th Chancellor of the State University System of Florida
- In office 1998–2001
- Preceded by: Charles B. Reed
- Succeeded by: Judy Hample

3rd President of University of North Florida
- In office 1989–1998
- Preceded by: Curtis L. McCray
- Succeeded by: Anne H. Hopkins

Personal details
- Born: December 1, 1943 (age 82) Muskogee, Oklahoma
- Education: USC; University of Pittsburgh
- Profession: Academic Administrator

Academic background
- Thesis: Municipal charter reform: The Los Angeles experience from a minority group perspective (1971)
- Doctoral advisor: Joseph A. James
- Other advisor: David Mars

Academic work
- Discipline: Public administration
- Sub-discipline: Urban planning
- Institutions: University of North Florida; Florida International University; University of Southern California; Howard University; University of Pittsburgh

Adam William Herbert, Jr. (born December 1, 1943) is an American retired academic administrator. He served as president of the University of North Florida from 1989 to 1998, as chancellor of the State University System of Florida from 1998 to 2001, and as president of Indiana University from 2003 to 2007. He was the first African-American to hold the latter two positions. He announced his retirement from Indiana University in 2007, and was succeeded by Michael McRobbie.

== Early years ==
Born in Muskogee, Oklahoma, he and his sister Tamashia Buckner were raised by their mother, Addie Hibler Herbert, who was a divorcee. Herbert attended Manual Training High School. Herbert's mother was a teacher and librarian and a strong influence on him. He has called her his personal hero. Herbert earned a Bachelor of Arts in political science (1966) and a Master of Public Administration (1968) from the University of Southern California. He earned his Ph.D. in urban affairs and public administration from the University of Pittsburgh in 1971.

== Academic career and service in Florida ==
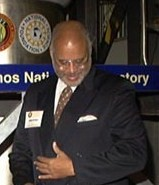
Herbert at the Los Alamos National Laboratory in 1998

Herbert's academic career started at University of Southern California as a faculty member in the School of Public Administration and the Center for Urban Affairs. In 1972 he became the chair of urban affairs program and associate professor of urban affairs at the Virginia Polytechnic Institute and State University (Virginia Tech).

== Leadership at Indiana University ==
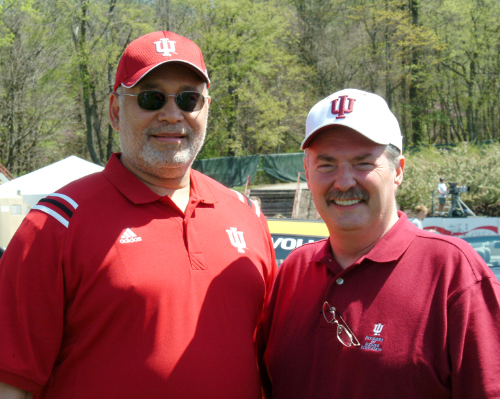
Herbert with Congressman Mike Sodrel in 2005

On June 6, 2003, Herbert was selected to be IU's 17th president, his term began on August 1, 2003. Upon assuming leadership of Indiana University, one of Herbert's biggest initiatives focused on "mission differentiation" for IU's eight campuses, which included making the flagship Bloomington campus more selective. Under the proposal Indiana University Bloomington would have educated the professionals, executives and researchers while the regional campuses would be tasked with educating the labor force.

A signature accomplishment of Herbert's time at IU was the creation of what was then called the "Hoosier Presidential Scholars," in 2005. Following the announcement of his retirement, the scholarship was renamed in his honor and remains awarded as the "Herbert Presidential Scholars Program."

== Post IU post ==
Herbert served on the transition team of Mayor-elect of Jacksonville Alvin Brown.

Academic offices
Preceded by Roy E. McTarnaghan	President of University of North Florida; 1989–1998	Succeeded by E. K. Fretwell (interim)
Preceded by Myles Brand	President of Indiana University; 2003–2007	Succeeded by Michael McRobbie
