= Pamela Whitten =

American scholar

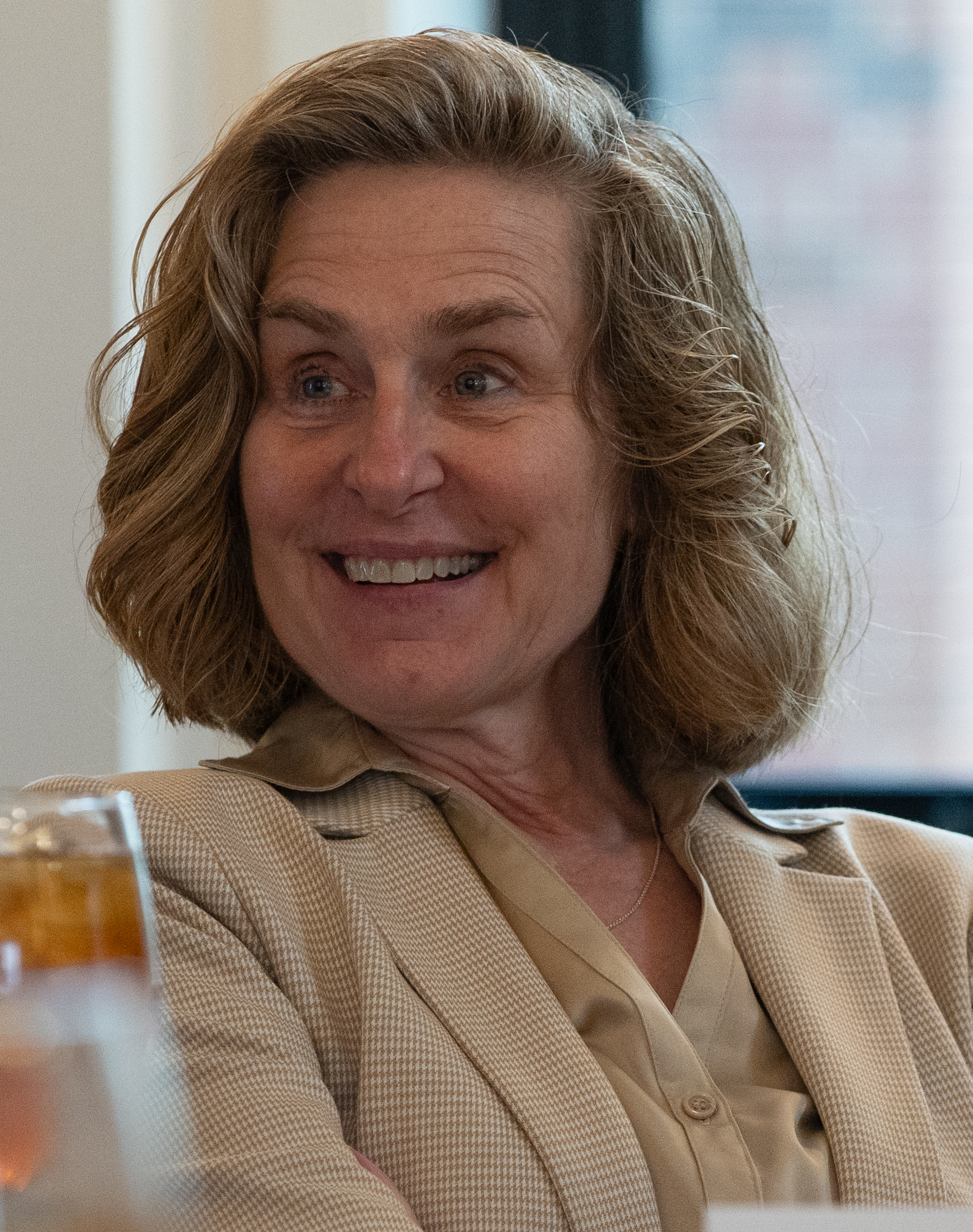
- Whitten in 2023

19th President of Indiana University
- Incumbent
- Assumed office July 1, 2021
- Preceded by: Michael McRobbie

5th President of Kennesaw State University
- In office July 16, 2018 – June 30, 2021
- Preceded by: Sam Olens
- Succeeded by: Kathy Schwaig

Personal details
- Education: Tulane University (BS); University of Kentucky (MA); University of Kansas (PhD)
- Scientific career
- Fields: Telecommunications, Telemedicine
- Institutions: University of Kansas Medical Center; Michigan State University; University of Georgia; Kennesaw State University; Indiana University
- Thesis: Transcending the technology of telemedicine: A case study of telemedicine in North Carolina (1996)
- Doctoral advisor: Beverly Sypher

Pamela Sasse Whitten is an American scholar in communication studies, currently serving as the 19th president of Indiana University since July 2021. She previously served as the 5th president of Kennesaw State University from 2018 to 2021 and as provost at the University of Georgia from 2014 to 2018.

== Early life and education ==
Pamela Whitten grew up in Tennessee. She lived in Brentwood and Memphis before her family moved when she was 14.

Whitten received a bachelor's degree in management from Tulane University School of Business in 1985, a master's degree in organizational communication from the University of Kentucky in 1986, and a PhD in communication studies from the University of Kansas in 1996.

In January 2025 Whitten was accused of plagiarizing her 1996 doctoral dissertation. Indiana University later denied the allegations and claimed that an independent law firm had reviewed the allegations in August 2024 and found them meritless though a report on the review has not been publicly released. Some plagiarism experts who spoke to The Herald-Times in August 2025 have stated that they believed the dissertation was still plagiarized.

== Career ==
After receiving her PhD in 1996, Whitten joined the University of Kansas Medical Center as an assistant professor at the Department of Family Medicine.

=== Michigan State University ===
In 1998, she moved to Michigan State University as an assistant professor at the Department of Telecommunications. She was promoted to associate professor in 2001 and to full professor in 2005. Whitten did research on telemedicine, and published about 100 peer-reviewed articles and two books about the subject.

At the College of Communication Arts and Sciences at Michigan State University, Whitten was named as assistant dean in 2006, as associate dean in 2007, and then as full dean in 2009. She served as dean of the College of Communication Arts and Science from 2009 to 2014.

=== Georgia and Kennesaw State ===
Whitten served as provost and senior vice president for academic affairs at the University of Georgia from 2014 to 2018.

In July 2018, Whitten became president of Kennesaw State University in Georgia. In 2019, she joined the NCAA Division I Committee on Academics.

=== Indiana University ===
On April 16, 2021, the Board of Trustees at Indiana University (IU) named Whitten the 19th president-elect of the university. This makes Whitten the first woman to ever hold the position of president at IU. Her term as IU president started on July 1, 2021. The appointment was praised by some alumni, but the search process that led to Whitten's appointment was controversial amongst some faculty.

On April 16, 2024, the Indiana University Bloomington faculty overwhelmingly passed votes of no confidence for IU president Pamela Whitten with 93.1% (827 to 29) of the vote against Whitten. In response, the Indiana University Board of Trustees reaffirmed their support for Whitten and her administration, although it was later revealed that the support was not unanimous.

On April 25, 2024, Whitten formed an ad hoc committee to change the terms of use of the Indiana University Assembly Ground on the eve of pro-Palestinian protests. This policy change facilitated the arrest of students, faculty, and community members who were occupying Dunn Meadow. Legal scholars interviewed by The Herald-Times questioned whether the policy changes may have violated the First Amendment to the United States Constitution.

On January 22, 2025, The Chronicle of Higher Education reported that Whitten's doctoral dissertation had more than three dozen instances of copied language without a source, or plagiarism. However, Indiana University cleared her for this alleged academic misconduct.

Academic offices
Preceded by Sam Olens	5th President of Kennesaw State University; 2018 — 2021	Succeeded by Kathy Schwaig
Preceded by Michael McRobbie	19th President of Indiana University; 2021 — current	Incumbent
