= RedCLARA =

RedCLARA - Latin American Cooperation of Advanced Networks - Cooperación Latino Americana de Redes Avanzadas
- Cooperación Latino Americana de Redes Avanzadas
- Abbreviation: CLARA
- Formation: 10 June 2003; 22 years ago, incorporated in Montevideo, Uruguay
- Legal status: Association
- Purpose: Research Networking
- Headquarters: Santiago, Chile
- Region served: Latin America
- Executive Director: Luis Eliécer Cadenas
- Main organ: General Assembly
- Website: www.redclara.net

CLARA (Latin American Advanced Networks Cooperation in English, Cooperación Latino Americana de Redes Avanzadas, in Spanish, the native language of the institution, and Cooperação Latino-Americana de Redes Avançadas in Portuguese) is an international organization whose aim is to connect Latin America's Research and Education Networks (NRENs), that manages RedCLARA, the network.

Since year 2004 RedCLARA provides regional interconnection and connection to the world through its links to GÉANT (pan-European advanced network) and to Internet2 (United States) and, through them, to Africa's advanced networks (UbuntuNet Alliance, WACREN, ASREN), Asia (APAN, TEIN, CAREN) and Oceania (AARNET), among others. Thus, the largest academic community in Latin America has been formed, which is actively connected in order to work on multiple projects with international peers.

RedCLARA is a non-profit International Law Organisation, whose legal existence is dated on 23 December 2003, when it was acknowledged as such by the legislation of Uruguay.

RedCLARA develops and operates the only Latin-American advanced Internet network. Established for regional interconnection and linked to GÉANT2 (pan European advanced network) in 2004 via the ALICE Project (which – until March 2008 – was co-funded by the European Commission through its @LIS Programme), RedCLARA provides regional interconnection and connection to the world through its international links to GÉANT and Internet2 (USA). Thanks to the ALICE2 Project, between December 2008 and March 2012, RedCLARA could significantly improve the capacity of its network and expand its benefits for its members and regional research communities.

Thanks to the EU funded BELLA Programme, from 2017 to 2022, RedCLARA could establish a direct link to GÉANT, connecting for the first time Europe and Latin America through the EllaLink submarine cable in September 2021, that was complemented by the upgrade of RedCLARA's South American portion of its backbone.

RedCLARA is constituted by 13 Latin American countries and its Assembly –where each country has representative- meets every six months to define courses of action and the policies to be implemented.
