= Purdue University in Indianapolis =

University expansion campus in Indianapolis, Indiana, U.S.

- Type: Public land-grant research university expansion campus
- Established: July 1, 2024
- Parent institution: Purdue Main Campus
- Location: Indianapolis, Indiana, U.S. 39°46′26.4″N 86°10′21.0″W
- Campus: 21 acres (8.5 ha) in downtown Indianapolis; Urban
- Website: www.purdue.edu/indianapolis

Purdue University in Indianapolis is an expansion campus of Purdue University's West Lafayette location in Indianapolis, Indiana, United States.

== History ==
The campus was formed on July 1, 2024, following the splitting of Indiana University–Purdue University Indianapolis (IUPUI) into Indiana University Indianapolis (IUI) and Purdue University in Indianapolis. It inherited the former IUPUI School of Engineering and Technology and the computer science program within the former IUPUI School of Science. All other academic programs, including the athletic program, became part of IU Indianapolis. Purdue plans to expand its academic offerings beyond those.

== Operation ==
As a fully-integrated expansion campus, students are admitted to Purdue University as a whole, and can choose to spend each semester either at the Purdue University West Lafayette or Indianapolis campus. Indianapolis is not a regional campus; it has the same oversight and academic rigor as West Lafayette. A goal of the split is to increase the retention of students in Indiana after graduation.

== Transportation and access ==
Campus connect shuttles operate between the West Lafayette and Indianapolis campuses, provided by Royal Excursion. The Purdue Campus Connect shuttle is available at no cost to faculty, staff and students who spend time at both campuses.

Multiple round trips between West Lafayette and Indianapolis are offered daily during the week with a reduced schedule on the weekends during the fall and spring semesters. The 50-passenger coach buses are ADA compliant and include Wi-Fi, collaboration spaces and restrooms.

Students can also take the JagLine shuttle operated by Indiana University Indianapolis for transportation around campus.

Indianapolis International Airport, the nearest major international airport, is located approximately 8 miles southwest of campus and is accessible by car and public transit, including IndyGo Route 8.

== Campus ==
Purdue's Indianapolis campus is a 28-acre (11 ha) plot that was formerly the northeastern-most portion of IUPUI's campus, bordered by Michigan Street, West Street, and Indiana Avenue in downtown Indianapolis. Purdue also initially leased five academic buildings and part of a dormitory from IUI. Ground was broken on the Academic Success Building in April 2025, which will be Purdue's flagship building in Indianapolis. The 248,000-square-foot (23,000 m^{2}) facility, which will have residential, dining, classroom, and laboratory space, is scheduled to be completed in 2027.

Purdue is also creating shared spaces for its faculty and students with industry partners throughout the Indianapolis area. The Purdue motorsports engineering program in Indianapolis moved into Dallara's U.S. headquarters in Speedway, Indiana, and the newly launched radiopharmaceutical manufacturing graduate program will be housed at the SpectronRx facility on the northside of Indianapolis.
