= National Register of Historic Places listings in Stephens County, Oklahoma =

Location of Stephens County in Oklahoma

This is a list of the National Register of Historic Places listings in Stephens County, Oklahoma.

This is intended to be a complete list of the properties on the National Register of Historic Places in Stephens County, Oklahoma, United States. The locations of National Register properties for which the latitude and longitude coordinates are included below, may be seen in a map.

There are 10 properties listed on the National Register in the county.

This National Park Service list is complete through NPS recent listings posted March 21, 2025.

== Current listings ==
	Name on the Register	Image	Date listed	Location	City or town	Description
1	Brittain-Garvin House	Brittain-Garvin House	August 31, 2000 (#00001039)	411 North 9th St. 34°30′26″N 97°57′27″W	Duncan	
2	H.C. Chrislip House	H.C. Chrislip House	August 6, 1993 (#93000677)	709 N. 14th St. 34°30′40″N 97°57′53″W	Duncan	
3	Duncan Armory	Duncan Armory	December 13, 1996 (#96001490)	100 feet from the junction of 14th St. and an unmarked alley between Fuqua Park and Ash Ave. 34°30′22″N 97°57′55″W	Duncan	
4	Duncan Public Library	Duncan Public Library	November 30, 1999 (#99001427)	301 N. 8th St. 34°30′19″N 97°57′23″W	Duncan	
5	W.T. Foreman House	W.T. Foreman House	June 5, 2003 (#03000512)	814 W. Oak Ave. 34°30′14″N 97°57′27″W	Duncan	
6	Johnson Hotel and Boarding House	Johnson Hotel and Boarding House	May 14, 1986 (#86001098)	314 W. Mulberry; 34°29′42″N 97°57′04″W	Duncan	
7	Marlow Armory	Marlow Armory	April 7, 1994 (#94000282)	702 W. Main St. 34°38′50″N 97°57′49″W	Marlow	
8	Montgomery-Linam House	Montgomery-Linam House	September 22, 1983 (#83002128)	301 N. 5th St. 34°39′02″N 97°57′29″W	Marlow	
9	Patterson Hospital	Patterson Hospital	December 7, 1995 (#95001417)	929 W. Willow Ave. 34°30′04″N 97°57′33″W	Duncan	
10	Louis B. Simmons House	Louis B. Simmons House	March 2, 2001 (#01000207)	401 N. 9th St. 34°30′23″N 97°57′27″W	Duncan	

== See also ==
- List of National Historic Landmarks in Oklahoma
- National Register of Historic Places listings in Oklahoma
