= Southwest Air Fast Express =

- Founded: 1928; 97 years ago
- Ceased operations: c. 1929–1930; 95 years ago
- Parent company: American Airlines
- Headquarters: Tulsa, Oklahoma
- Key people: Erle P. Haliburton, Zero Haliburton

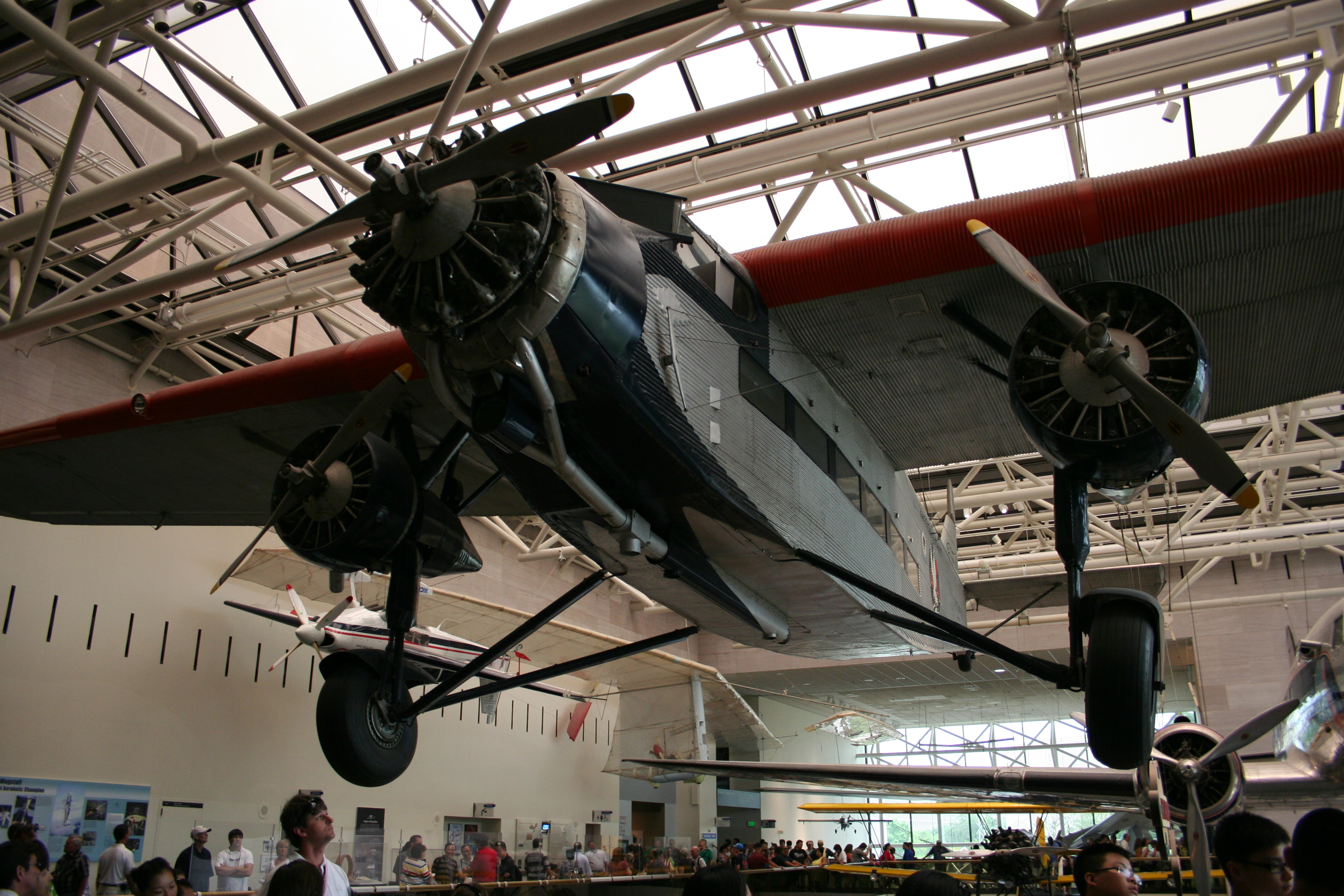
Ford Trimotor at Smithsonian

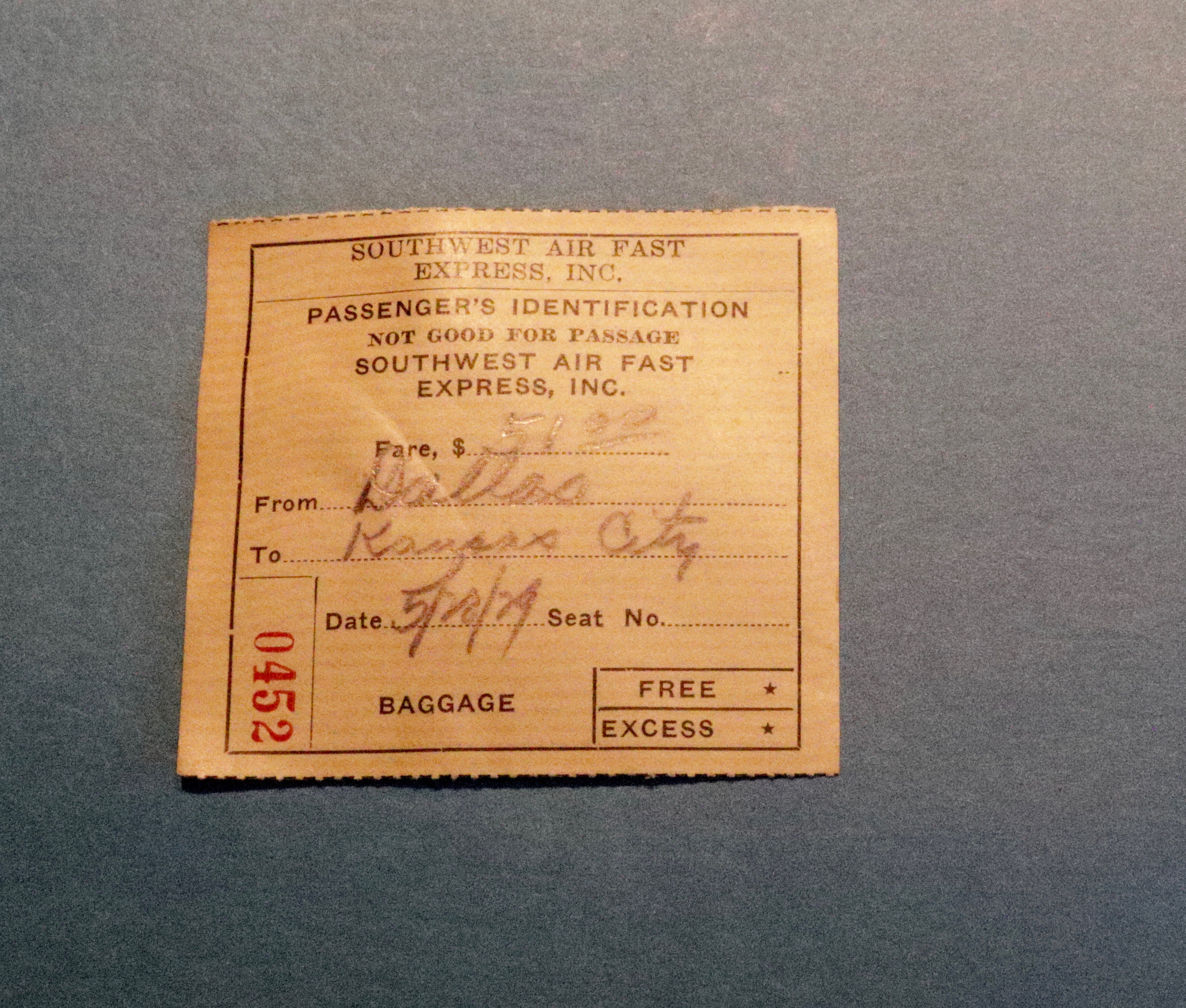
From family archives. A stub documenting a flight from Dallas to Kansas City on short-lived airline Southwest Air Fast Express on May 28, 1929 Fare $51.00

Southwest Air Fast Express (SAFE), also known as S.A.F.E.way, was a United States airline. It was founded by Erle P. Halliburton, the founder of the New Method Oil Well Cementing Company (now known as Halliburton), and Zero Halliburton, a briefcase manufacturer.

== History ==
Founded in 1928 with Oklahoma oilmen as stockholders, S.A.F.E.way began offering Ford Tri-Motor service between St. Louis and Dallas on April 2, 1929.

In June 1929 service was expanded to include Los Angeles and New York City. Operating for a little more than a year, the airline was purchased by American Airlines for $1,400,000.00 through a complicated agreement primarily to obtain the Contract Air Mail (CAM) 33 mail services contract won by Halliburton and Southwest Air Fast Express. American renamed the airline Southern Transcontinental Airways and operated the CAM-33 route under that name until June 30, 1931 when American Airways took over.

== See also ==
- List of defunct airlines of the United States
