= Ben Aldridge (defensive back) =

American football player (1926–1956)

No. 31, 0, 38, 40
- Positions: Defensive back, halfback

Personal information
- Born: October 24, 1926; Duncan, Oklahoma, U.S.
- Died: May 14, 1956 (aged 29); Bradley, Oklahoma, U.S.
- Listed height: 6 ft 0 in (1.83 m)
- Listed weight: 195 lb (88 kg)

Career information
- High school: Velma-Alma (Velma, Oklahoma)
- College: Oklahoma State
- NFL draft: 1950: 6th round, 68th overall pick

Career history
- New York Yanks (1950–1951); Dallas Texans (1952); San Francisco 49ers (1952); Green Bay Packers (1953)

Career NFL statistics
- Rushing yards: 105
- Rushing average: 3.6
- Receptions: 8
- Receiving yards: 78
- Interceptions: 11
- Fumble recoveries: 5
- Total touchdowns: 1
- Stats at Pro Football Reference

Bennie Leo "Lefty" Aldridge (October 24, 1926 – May 14, 1956) was an American professional football defensive back and a halfback in the National Football League who played for the New York Yanks, the Dallas Texans, the San Francisco 49ers and the Green Bay Packers. Aldridge played his college football at Oklahoma State University and played 43 professional games from 1950–1953.
