= Basil Wilkerson =

American football player (1907–1967)

Profile
- Position: Offensive lineman

Personal information
- Born: January 22, 1907; Duncan, Oklahoma, U.S.
- Died: September 2, 1967 (aged 60); Odessa, Texas, U.S.

Career information
- High school: Duncan (OK)
- College: Oklahoma City

Career history
- Boston Braves (1932); Staten Island Stapletons (1932); Cincinnati Reds (1934)

Career statistics
- Games played: 10
- Stats at Pro Football Reference

Basil Glenn Wilkerson (January 22, 1907 – September 2, 1967) was an American football offensive lineman in the National Football League (NFL) for the Boston Braves, Staten Island Stapletons, and the Cincinnati Reds. He played college football at Oklahoma City University.

== Early life ==
Wilkerson was born in Duncan, Oklahoma and attended Duncan High School.

== College career ==
Wilkerson attended and played college football at Oklahoma City University. He was part of the Oklahoma City Stars football team that went undefeated in 1931. After the season, Wilkerson played in the East–West Shrine Game.

== Professional career ==
After college, Wilkerson played in the National Football League (NFL) for the Boston Braves, Staten Island Stapletons, and the Cincinnati Reds.

== After football ==
Wilkerson and his family moved to Odessa, Texas and he became a member of the Odessa College board of regents. He died of a heart attack on September 2, 1967.
