= Alma, Oklahoma =

Alma
- Unincorporated community
- Location within the state of Oklahoma Alma (the United States)
- Coordinates: 34°25′10″N 97°36′44″W
- Country: United States
- State: Oklahoma
- County: Stephens
- Elevation: 1,066 ft (325 m)
- Time zone: UTC-6 (Central (CST))
  - Summer (DST): UTC-5 (CDT)
- GNIS feature ID: 1089594

Alma is a rural community located in southwestern Stephens County, Oklahoma, United States. The Alma Post Office, said to be named for Alma Peeples (an early-day resident), was opened February 14, 1906.

At the time of its founding, Alma was located in Pickens County, Chickasaw Nation.

The Alma School District was consolidated with the one at Velma.
