= Halliburton Field =

Halliburton Field Duncan Municipal Airport
- IATA: DUC; ICAO: KDUC; FAA LID: DUC

Summary
- Airport type: Public
- Owner: City of Duncan
- Serves: Duncan, Oklahoma
- Elevation AMSL: 1,113 ft (339 m)
- Coordinates: 34°28′15″N 097°57′36″W
- Interactive map of Halliburton Field

Runways
Direction	Length		Surface
Direction	ft	m	Surface
17/35	6,650	2,027	Concrete

Statistics (2007)
- Aircraft operations: 8,750
- Based aircraft: 58
- Source: Federal Aviation Administration

Halliburton Field (IATA: DUC, ICAO: KDUC, FAA LID: DUC) (Duncan Municipal Airport) is in Stephens County, Oklahoma, United States, two miles south of Duncan, which owns it.

== Historical airline service ==
Duncan received scheduled commercial airline flights between 1954 and 1973. Central Airlines began service in 1954 using Douglas DC-3s on flights to Dallas and Fort Worth, as well as to Oklahoma City, with a stop in Lawton.

In 1967 Central merged into the original Frontier Airlines, which used Convair 580 aircraft on its flights until ending service in 1972. Mid-Continent Airlines, a small commuter airline at the time, provided flights to Dallas, Oklahoma City, and Altus, Oklahoma for a time in 1973. Since then Duncan has not seen regular air service.

== Facilities ==
Halliburton Field covers 560 acres (230 ha) at an elevation of 1,113 feet (339 m). Its single runway, 17/35, is 6,650 x 100 ft (2,027 x 30 m) concrete.

In the year ending November 29, 2007 the airport had 8,750 aircraft operations, average 23 per day: 97% general aviation and 3% air taxi. 58 aircraft were then based at the airport: 81% single-engine, 14% multi-engine, 3% jet and 2% helicopter.

== See also ==
- List of airports in Oklahoma
