= Teip Ltd. =

Norwegian commercial production company

- Company type: Public
- Industry: Commercials
- Founded: 2006; 20 years ago
- Headquarters: Stavanger, Norway
- Key people: Lars Aage Wessel (CEO)
- Products: Commercials; Postproduction; CG Graphics
- Website: teip.net

Teip Ltd. (pronounced TAPE) is a film and commercial production company located in Stavanger, Norway. The company was founded in 2006. The CEO of Teip is Lars Aage Wessel.

Teip has made music videos, infomercials, commercials and corporate presentations. At the moment, Teip is working on a children's 3D animated TV-series about the Sami people. The series is directed by Hanne Buljo, produced by Lars Aage Wessel, and the 3D animation and modelling is supervised by Geert-Jan Nilsen.

Teip Ltd was established in the Norwegian house of Records in 2006. As of February 21. 2007, was Teip Ltd qualified in the Achilles Joint Qualification System, a Norwegian prequalification system for the major offshore related companies, as Statoil, Royal Dutch Shell, ConocoPhillips, Halliburton and more.
