= Meridian, Stephens County, Oklahoma =

Meridian is a former census-designated place (CDP) in Stephens County, Oklahoma, United States. The population was 1,485 at the 2000 census. As of the 2020 census, the area, plus land to the north, was part of the Sunray CDP.

== Geography ==
Meridian is located at 34°25′01″N 97°58′11″W (34.416951, -97.969636). According to the United States Census Bureau, the CDP has a total area of 7.6 square miles (19.8 km^{2}), of which 7.6 square miles (19.8 km^{2}) is land and 0.13% is water.

== Demographics ==
As of the census of 2000, there were 1,485 people, 552 households, and 439 families residing in the CDP. The population density was 194.6 inhabitants per square mile (75.1/km^{2}). There were 643 housing units at an average density of 84.3 per square mile (32.5/km^{2}). The racial makeup of the CDP was 85.93% White, 0.20% African American, 9.02% Native American, 0.07% Asian, 0.40% from other races, and 4.38% from two or more races. Hispanic or Latino of any race were 1.75% of the population.

There were 552 households, out of which 32.4% had children under the age of 18 living with them, 67.8% were married couples living together, 8.3% had a female householder with no husband present, and 20.3% were non-families. 17.2% of all households were made up of individuals, and 7.8% had someone living alone who was 65 years of age or older. The average household size was 2.69 and the average family size was 3.02.

In the CDP, the population was spread out, with 26.8% under the age of 18, 7.5% from 18 to 24, 25.8% from 25 to 44, 24.6% from 45 to 64, and 15.2% who were 65 years of age or older. The median age was 39 years. For every 100 females, there were 100.7 males. For every 100 females age 18 and over, there were 95.9 males.

The median income for a household in the CDP was $34,196, and the median income for a family was $37,545. Males had a median income of $28,816 versus $18,958 for females. The per capita income for the CDP was $15,822. About 8.2% of families and 12.0% of the population were below the poverty line, including 17.1% of those under age 18 and 8.1% of those age 65 or over.
