= Central High, Oklahoma =

- Town
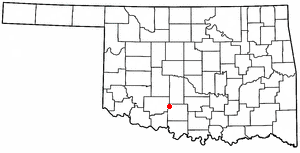
- Location of Central High, Oklahoma
- Coordinates: 34°36′57″N 98°04′49″W
- Country: United States
- State: Oklahoma
- County: Stephens

Area
  - Total: 53.88 sq mi (139.54 km^{2})
  - Land: 52.90 sq mi (137.02 km^{2})
  - Water: 0.98 sq mi (2.53 km^{2})
- Elevation: 1,171 ft (357 m)

Population (2020)
  - Total: 1,181
  - Density: 22.3/sq mi (8.62/km^{2})
- Time zone: UTC-6 (Central (CST))
  - Summer (DST): UTC-5 (CDT)
- FIPS code: 40-13135
- GNIS feature ID: 2413188
- Website: townofcentralhigh.gov

Central High is a town in Stephens County, Oklahoma, United States. The population was 1,181 at the time of the 2020 Census.

== History ==
The town was named in 1921, because it was near the center of a consolidated high school district (District 34), created from four smaller districts in Stephens County: Wolf Creek, Nellie, Prairie Center, and Pleasant Hill. Until then, students living in the area only had access to eighth grade education in each of the old districts. When Central High was formed, it built a four-room junior high and a senior high school named Central High School. Lower-grade students attended elementary schools in their former districts. This arrangement lasted until the late 1930s. A fire in 1952 destroyed the original Central High School.

The town incorporated in 1995. Supporters of incorporation wanted this so Central High could prevent annexation by surrounding towns, notably Duncan, Lawton or Marlow. Incorporation would also permit Central High to apply for municipal grants.

== Geography ==
Central High is located 8.5 miles (13.7 km) west of Marlow and 1 mile (1.6 km) north of SH 7.

According to the United States Census Bureau, the town has a total area of 53.8 square miles (139 km^{2}), of which 53.6 square miles (139 km^{2}) is land and 0.1 square miles (0.26 km^{2}) (0.24%) is water.

== Demographics ==
Historical population
Census	Pop.	Note	%±
2000	954		—
2010	1,199		25.7%
2020	1,181		−1.5%
U.S. Decennial Census

=== 2020 census ===
As of the 2020 census, Central High had a population of 1,181. The median age was 42.0 years. 24.9% of residents were under the age of 18 and 18.2% of residents were 65 years of age or older. For every 100 females there were 100.9 males, and for every 100 females age 18 and over there were 96.7 males age 18 and over.

0.0% of residents lived in urban areas, while 100.0% lived in rural areas.

There were 437 households in Central High, of which 34.8% had children under the age of 18 living in them. Of all households, 67.0% were married-couple households, 12.4% were households with a male householder and no spouse or partner present, and 15.1% were households with a female householder and no spouse or partner present. About 17.2% of all households were made up of individuals and 7.6% had someone living alone who was 65 years of age or older.

There were 491 housing units, of which 11.0% were vacant. The homeowner vacancy rate was 2.7% and the rental vacancy rate was 22.6%.

Racial composition as of the 2020 census
Race	Number	Percent
White	988	83.7%
Black or African American	11	0.9%
American Indian and Alaska Native	48	4.1%
Asian	1	0.1%
Native Hawaiian and Other Pacific Islander	0	0.0%
Some other race	25	2.1%
Two or more races	108	9.1%
Hispanic or Latino (of any race)	69	5.8%

=== 2000 census ===
As of the census of 2000, there were 954 people, 352 households, and 292 families residing in the town. The population density was 17.8 people per square mile (6.9/km^{2}). There were 398 housing units at an average density of 7.4 per square mile (2.9/km^{2}). The racial makeup of the town was 92.66% White, 0.10% African American, 3.04% Native American, 0.73% from other races, and 3.46% from two or more races. Hispanic or Latino of any race were 2.41% of the population.

There were 352 households, out of which 37.5% had children under the age of 18 living with them, 73.9% were married couples living together, 6.5% had a female householder with no husband present, and 16.8% were non-families. 14.8% of all households were made up of individuals, and 6.3% had someone living alone who was 65 years of age or older. The average household size was 2.71 and the average family size was 2.98.

In the town, the population was spread out, with 27.0% under the age of 18, 6.2% from 18 to 24, 28.1% from 25 to 44, 24.8% from 45 to 64, and 13.8% who were 65 years of age or older. The median age was 38 years. For every 100 females, there were 106.9 males. For every 100 females age 18 and over, there were 102.3 males.

The median income for a household in the town was $38,125, and the median income for a family was $40,104. Males had a median income of $34,130 versus $22,273 for females. The per capita income for the town was $16,679. About 11.8% of families and 14.1% of the population were below the poverty line, including 15.3% of those under age 18 and 10.0% of those age 65 or over.
