= Jeff Miller (American businessman) =

American businessman

- Miller in 2017
- Born: 1964 (age 61–62); Dallas, Texas, United States
- Education: McNeese State (BS); Texas A&M Business School (MBA)
- Occupation: Business executive
- Known for: Chief executive officer, and chairman of the board, Halliburton

Jeff Miller is an American oil executive. He is the chief executive officer, president, and chairman of the board of Halliburton, an oil field service company with operations in over 70 countries.

== Early life and education ==
Jeffrey Allen Miller was born in Dallas, Texas, in 1964. He attended the St. Mark's School of Texas, graduating in 1982. While at St. Mark's, he became interested in rodeo, ultimately earning a rodeo scholarship to McNeese State University. He competed briefly in professional rodeo roping before attending Texas A&M University, where he received his Masters in Business Administration.

== Career ==
After receiving his MBA, Miller worked as a certified public accountant at Arthur Andersen, the now defunct accounting firm. He moved to Halliburton in 1997. During his early years at Halliburton, he worked in oil field operations in Venezuela, Angola, Indonesia, and Dubai. He moved to Houston in 2010 to assume executive roles in the company, including executive vice president and chief operating officer. Miller was named president in 2014, CEO in 2017, and chairman of the Halliburton board on January 1, 2019.
