= Zero Halliburton =

Manufacturer of aluminium briefcases

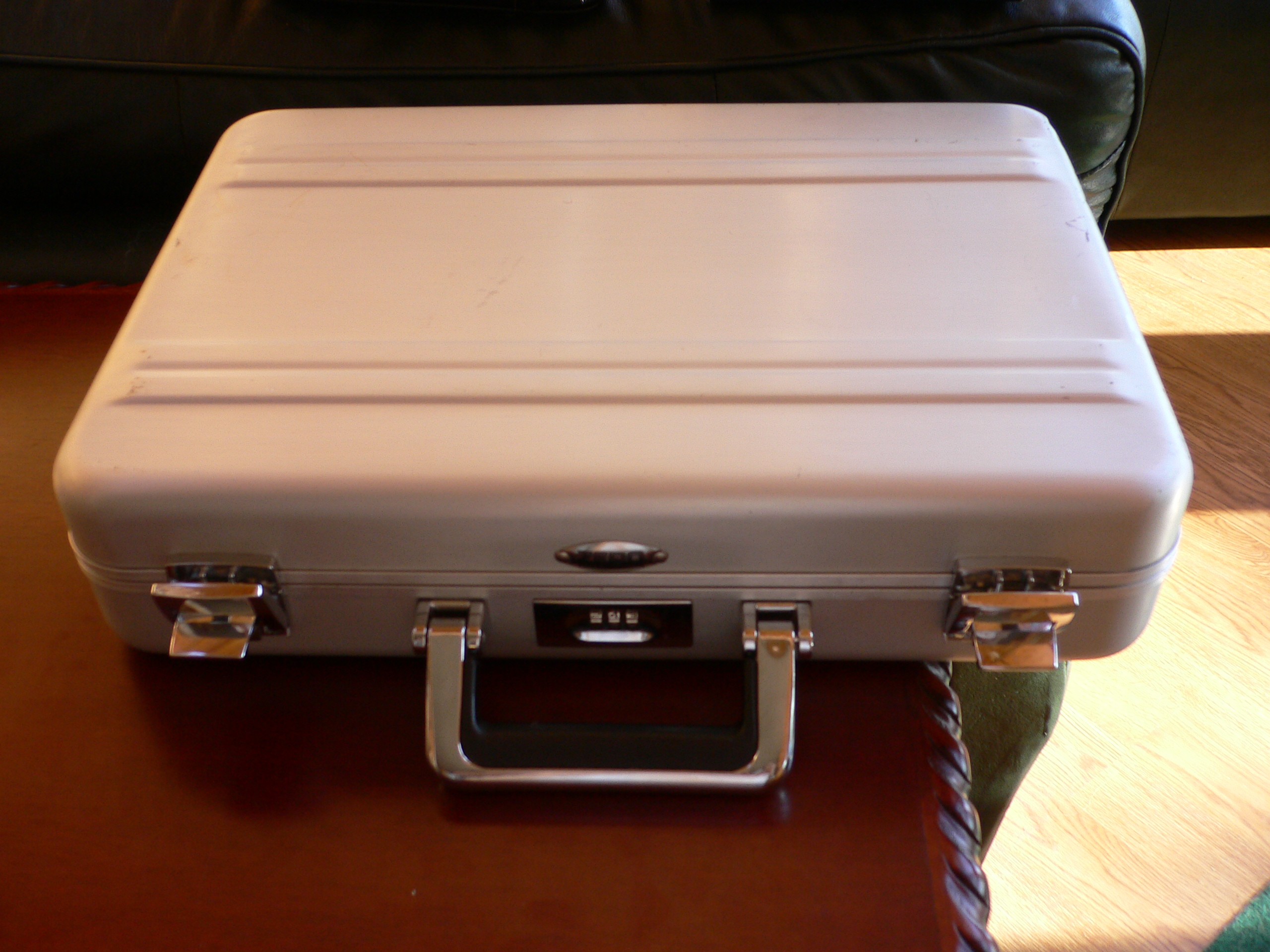
- Type: Subsidiary
- Industry: Consumer goods
- Founded: 1938
- Founder: Erle P. Halliburton
- Headquarters: North Salt Lake, Utah
- Parent: ACE Co., Ltd.

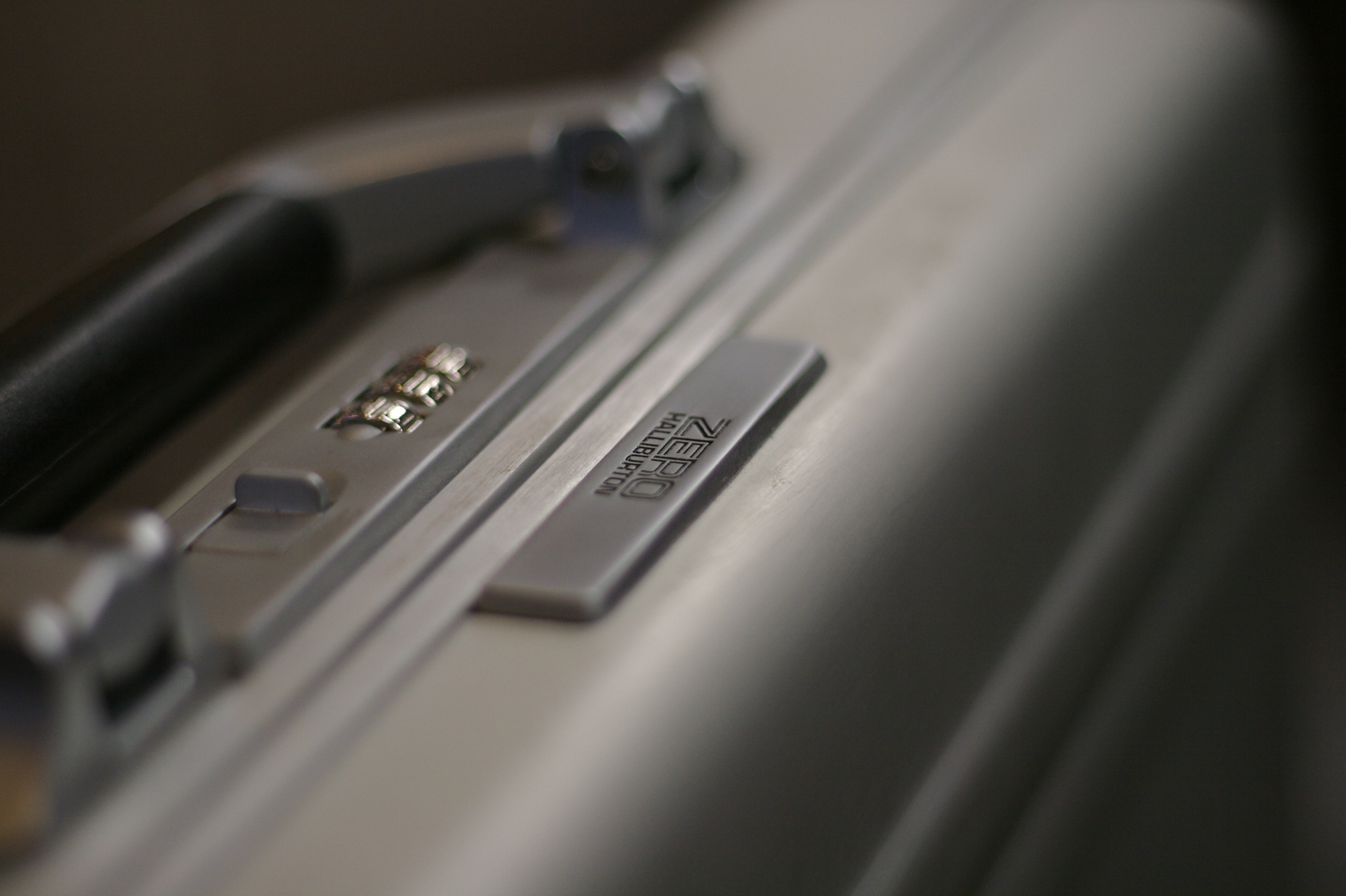
Close-up

Zero Halliburton, stylized as ZERO Halliburton, is a manufacturer of hard-wearing travel cases and briefcases, mainly of aluminium. Founded in 1938, the company was sold in 2006 to ACE Co., a Japanese luggage manufacturer.

== History ==
Erle P. Halliburton, the American founder of Halliburton, had commissioned the aluminium case in 1938 from aircraft engineers because other luggage could not endure the rough travel through Texas oil fields. In addition to being more durable than a leather or cloth case due to its rigidity, the aluminium case seals tightly against dust and water. Halliburton later sold the business to the metal manufacturing company, Zero.

In addition to aluminium, Zero Halliburton cases have been available in carbon fiber, polycarbonate, polypropylene, and Texalium (an aluminium-coated fiberglass).

On December 29, 2006, Zero Corporation sold its consumer division to ACE Co., Ltd., of Osaka and Tokyo, of which it is now a wholly owned subsidiary.

== Uses ==
=== Nuclear football ===
The nuclear football, the briefcase which the president of the United States can use to order a nuclear strike, is a modified Zero Halliburton case enclosed in a black leather 'jacket' to make it less conspicuous in public or diplomatic contexts.

=== Apollo 11 ===
Apollo 11 astronauts used technical cases from Zero Halliburton to transport rocks and sand from the moon.

== In popular culture ==
The aluminium cases have appeared in more than 200 Hollywood movies and television shows, including Ocean's Eleven, 24, Lost and the James Bond franchise, often as a MacGuffin.
