= Thomas H. Cruikshank =

Former chairman and CEO of Halliburton Company

Thomas H. Cruikshank is an American businessman who was chairman and CEO of Halliburton Company from 1989 to 1995.

During his tenure in the early 1990s, Halliburton provided extensive work to Kuwait in the aftermath of Operation Desert Storm. He was replaced at Halliburton by Dick Cheney.

Cruikshank is a graduate of Rice University and attended the University of Texas and University of Houston Law Schools. He married Ann Coe in 1955 and had three children.
