= Duncan Public Schools =

School district in Oklahoma

Coordinates: 34.514068°N 97.968323°W

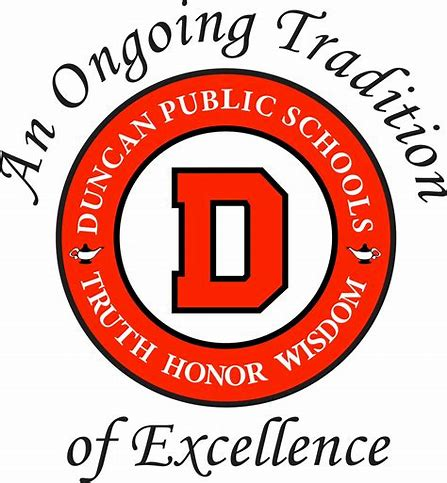

Location
- 1706 West Spruce; Duncan, Oklahoma 73533

District information
- Type: Public
- Motto: Truth. Honor. Wisdom
- Grades: PK-12
- Superintendent: Channa Byerly

Students and staff
- Students: 3,831
- Teachers: 223

Other information
- Website: www.duncanps.org

Duncan Public Schools is a public school district located in Stephens County, Oklahoma. The district includes 10 school sites.

The district covers 67.5 square miles (175 km^{2}) of land and includes portions of Duncan, Marlow and Bray and unincorporated parts of Stephens County, Oklahoma.

== History ==
At the time of Oklahoma statehood in 1907, Stephens County had only 20 common schools and three high schools, but by the 1930s there were 65 school districts, including the independent school district of Duncan.

== List of schools ==
=== Primary schools ===
- Emerson Elementary
- Plato Elementary
- Horace Mann Elementary
- Mark Twain Elementary
- Woodrow Wilson Elementary
- Will Rogers Pre-K

=== Secondary schools ===
- Duncan Middle School
- Duncan High School

=== Alternative Education ===
- E.D.G.E. Academy
