= Empire City, Oklahoma =

- Town
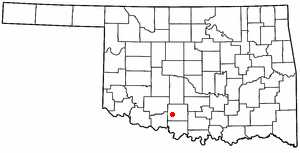
- Location of Empire City, Oklahoma
- Coordinates: 34°28′51″N 98°03′20″W
- Country: United States
- State: Oklahoma
- County: Stephens

Area
  - Total: 9.49 sq mi (24.57 km^{2})
  - Land: 9.32 sq mi (24.13 km^{2})
  - Water: 0.17 sq mi (0.44 km^{2})
- Elevation: 1,152 ft (351 m)

Population (2020)
  - Total: 703
  - Density: 75.5/sq mi (29.14/km^{2})
- Time zone: UTC-6 (Central (CST))
  - Summer (DST): UTC-5 (CDT)
- FIPS code: 40-23900
- GNIS feature ID: 2412486

Empire City (commonly called Empire) is a town in Stephens County, Oklahoma, United States. The population was 703 at the time of the 2020 Census.

== History ==
A classic oil-boom town, Empire City started in the late 1910s as drilling activity in Stephens County mushroomed. At its peak, its estimated population was about 3000. The original post office was established in February 1921 and discontinued in December 1934. With the boom long gone, the population by 1980 dwindled to just 13 persons. But the town started a rebound in the mid-1980s, though no post office has been reestablished.

== Geography ==
According to the United States Census Bureau, the town has a total area of 10.9 square miles (28 km^{2}), of which 10.8 square miles (28 km^{2}) is land and 0.04 square miles (0.10 km^{2}) (0.37%) is water.

== Demographics ==
Historical population
Census	Pop.	Note	%±
1970	23		—
1980	13		−43.5%
1990	219		1,584.6%
2000	734		235.2%
2010	955		30.1%
2020	703		−26.4%
U.S. Decennial Census

=== 2020 census ===
As of the 2020 census, Empire City had a population of 703. The median age was 44.2 years. 28.4% of residents were under the age of 18 and 19.6% of residents were 65 years of age or older. For every 100 females there were 94.7 males, and for every 100 females age 18 and over there were 97.3 males age 18 and over.

0.0% of residents lived in urban areas, while 100.0% lived in rural areas.

There were 258 households in Empire City, of which 35.3% had children under the age of 18 living in them. Of all households, 70.9% were married-couple households, 11.2% were households with a male householder and no spouse or partner present, and 14.0% were households with a female householder and no spouse or partner present. About 12.4% of all households were made up of individuals and 6.6% had someone living alone who was 65 years of age or older.

There were 279 housing units, of which 7.5% were vacant. The homeowner vacancy rate was 1.3% and the rental vacancy rate was 17.6%.

Racial composition as of the 2020 census
Race	Number	Percent
White	592	84.2%
Black or African American	5	0.7%
American Indian and Alaska Native	24	3.4%
Asian	1	0.1%
Native Hawaiian and Other Pacific Islander	0	0.0%
Some other race	14	2.0%
Two or more races	67	9.5%
Hispanic or Latino (of any race)	39	5.5%

=== 2010 census ===
As of the census of 2010, there were 955 people living in the town. The population density was 67.7 inhabitants per square mile (26.1/km^{2}). There were 369 housing units at an average density of 26.8 per square mile (10.3/km^{2}). The racial makeup of the town was 94.82% White, 0.14% African American, 3.13% Native American, 0.14% Asian, 0.68% from other races, and 1.09% from two or more races. Hispanic or Latino of any race were 2.18% of the population.

There were 266 households, out of which 41.0% had children under the age of 18 living with them, 77.8% were married couples living together, 3.8% had a female householder with no husband present, and 13.5% were non-families. 11.7% of all households were made up of individuals, and 4.5% had someone living alone who was 65 years of age or older. The average household size was 2.76 and the average family size was 2.98.

In the town, the population was spread out, with 27.1% under the age of 18, 6.8% from 18 to 24, 24.9% from 25 to 44, 30.1% from 45 to 64, and 11.0% who were 65 years of age or older. The median age was 40 years. For every 100 females, there were 107.9 males. For every 100 females age 18 and over, there were 101.9 males.

The median income for a household in the town was $39,722, and the median income for a family was $43,304. Males had a median income of $34,844 versus $23,750 for females. The per capita income for the town was $17,190. About 4.9% of families and 6.4% of the population were below the poverty line, including 5.8% of those under age 18 and 6.7% of those age 65 or over.
