= Erle P. Halliburton =

American businessman (1892–1957)

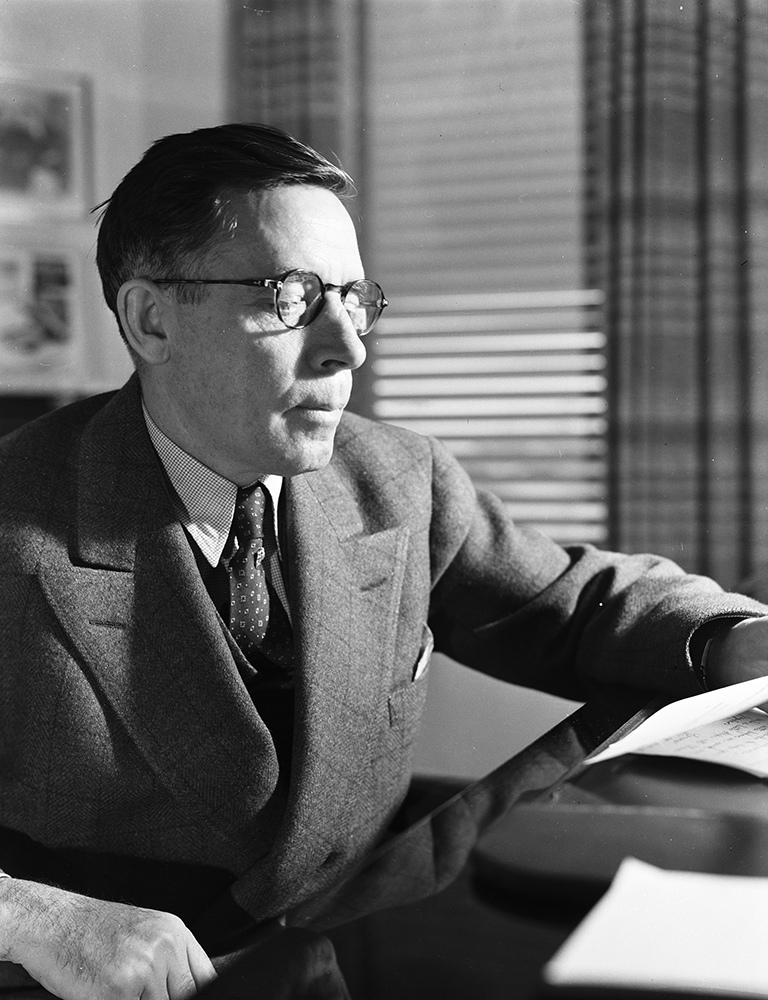
- Halliburton in 1940
- Born: Erle Palmer Halliburton; November 22, 1892; Henning, Tennessee, U.S.
- Died: October 13, 1957 (aged 64); Los Angeles, California, U.S.
- Known for: Founder of the Halliburton Company
- Spouse: Vida C. Taber
- Children: 5

Erle Palmer Halliburton (September 22, 1892 – October 13, 1957) was an American businessman specializing in oil field services.

== Early life ==
Halliburton was born on September 22, 1892, near Henning, Tennessee, the son of Lou Emma (Cothran) and Edwin Graves Halliburton. When Halliburton was 12 years old, his father died. At 14, Halliburton left home to support the family. As a youth, he learned how to operate heavy machinery such as a locomotive, a steam crane, and a steam shovel. Later, Halliburton was a salesman in New York.

== Business career ==
Before the United States entered into World War I, Halliburton gained exposure to shipboard engineering as a member of the United States Navy. After his honorable discharge in 1915, he headed for the oilfields of California, where he was able to apply techniques analogous to the technology with which he had worked in the Navy. His drive and his sense of innovation soon brought him into conflict with his boss, Almond Perkins. Halliburton later quipped that getting hired and getting fired by the Perkins Oil Well Cementing Company were the two best opportunities he had ever received.

Halliburton then moved to Duncan, Oklahoma, where he invented, perfected, and patented a new method of oil well cementing. According to one of the inscriptions on the pictured monument, Halliburton's method "isolates the various downhole zones, guards against a collapse of the casing and permits control of the well during its producing life." In 1919, based on this new method, Halliburton started Duncan's New Method Oil Well Cementing Company. By 1922, the company was operating as the Halliburton Oil Well Cementing Company. On July 5, 1961, it became known as the Halliburton Company.

Halliburton also founded Southwest Air Fast Express, which was later acquired by American Airlines.

Halliburton designed the aluminum suitcases which are now manufactured by Zero Halliburton.

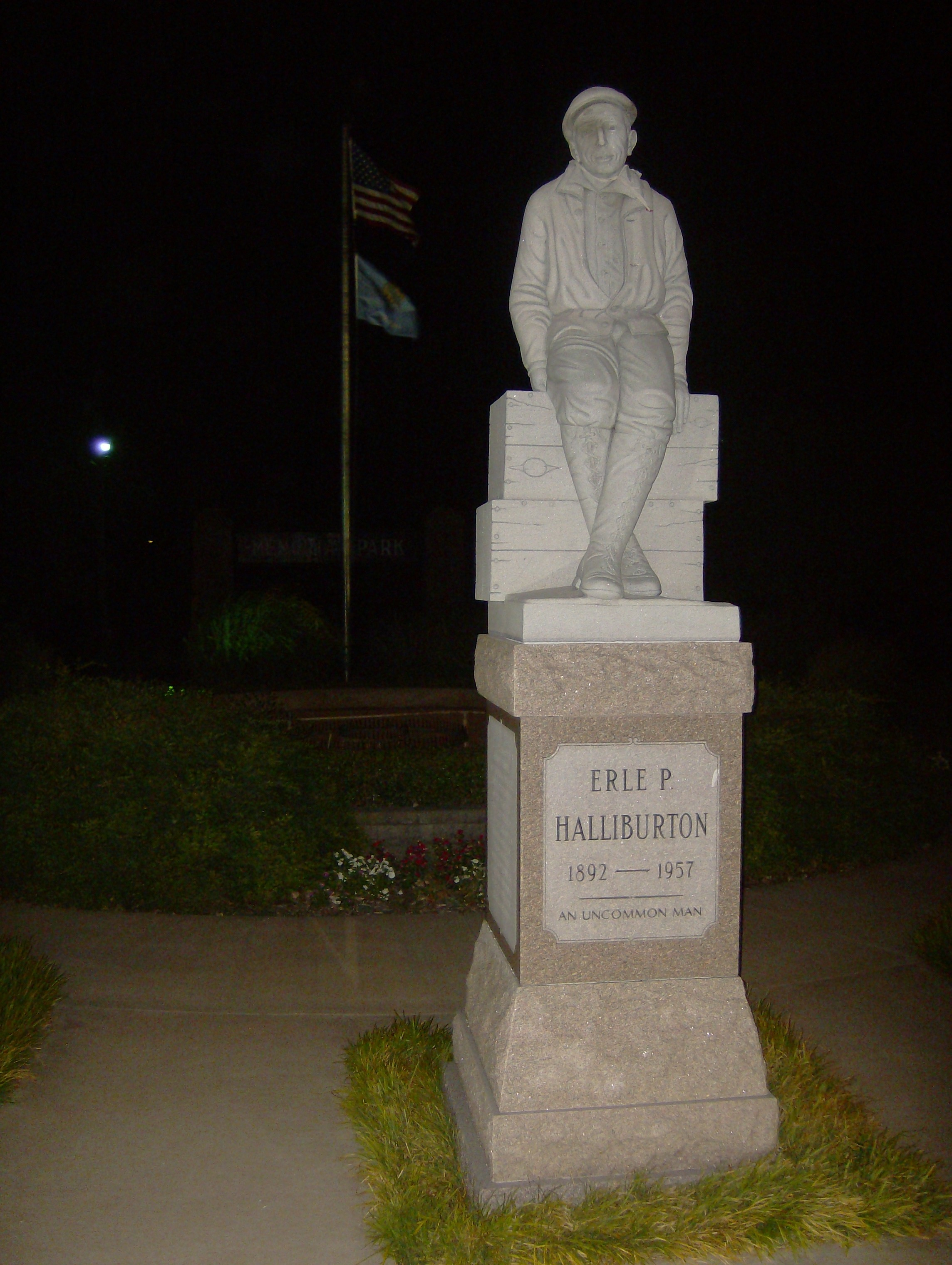
"An Uncommon Man;" Erle P. Halliburton Monument in Memorial Park, Duncan, OK; erected – 1993

Halliburton was inducted into the Oklahoma Hall of Fame in 1957.

Halliburton died on October 13, 1957, in Los Angeles at the age of 64.

== Private life ==
Halliburton was married to Vida C. Taber Halliburton. They had 5 children: Erle P., Jr., David, Zola Catherine, Vida Jessie, and Ruth Lou. Erle Halliburton was a cousin of adventure writer Richard Halliburton.
