= Sunray, Oklahoma =

Sunray
- Census designated place
- Location within the state of Oklahoma Sunray (the United States)
- Coordinates: 34°24′40″N 97°57′37″W
- Country: United States
- State: Oklahoma
- County: Stephens

Area
  - Total: 1.78 sq mi (4.62 km^{2})
  - Land: 1.75 sq mi (4.53 km^{2})
  - Water: 0.035 sq mi (0.09 km^{2})
- Elevation: 1,073 ft (327 m)

Population (2020)
  - Total: 853
  - Density: 488.1/sq mi (188.46/km^{2})
- Time zone: UTC-6 (Central (CST))
  - Summer (DST): UTC-5 (CDT)
- FIPS code: 40-71650
- GNIS feature ID: 2812871

Sunray (also known as Beckett) is a small unincorporated community in Stephens County, Oklahoma, United States. It is south of Duncan on U.S. Route 81.

As of the 2020 census, Sunray had a population of 853.

The community is adjacent to the old DX-Sunray refinery (TOSCO Corp. Duncan refinery) which closed in 1983 and was imploded in 2006.

== Demographics ==
Historical population
Census	Pop.	Note	%±
2020	853		—
U.S. Decennial Census

=== 2020 census ===
As of the 2020 census, Sunray had a population of 853. The median age was 41.8 years. 25.9% of residents were under the age of 18 and 21.3% of residents were 65 years of age or older. For every 100 females there were 99.8 males, and for every 100 females age 18 and over there were 105.9 males age 18 and over.

0.0% of residents lived in urban areas, while 100.0% lived in rural areas.

There were 330 households in Sunray, of which 26.7% had children under the age of 18 living in them. Of all households, 52.4% were married-couple households, 19.7% were households with a male householder and no spouse or partner present, and 23.9% were households with a female householder and no spouse or partner present. About 32.2% of all households were made up of individuals and 18.5% had someone living alone who was 65 years of age or older.

There were 362 housing units, of which 8.8% were vacant. The homeowner vacancy rate was 0.3% and the rental vacancy rate was 0.0%.

Racial composition as of the 2020 census
Race	Number	Percent
White	646	75.7%
Black or African American	5	0.6%
American Indian and Alaska Native	69	8.1%
Asian	1	0.1%
Native Hawaiian and Other Pacific Islander	0	0.0%
Some other race	4	0.5%
Two or more races	128	15.0%
Hispanic or Latino (of any race)	39	4.6%

== Climate ==
Climate is characterized by relatively high temperatures and evenly distributed precipitation throughout the year. The Köppen Climate Classification subtype for this climate is "Cfa" (Humid Subtropical Climate).
