= Gearhart Industries =

American oil well service company

Gearhart Industries, The GO Company (formerly GO Oil Well Services, Gearhart-Owen Industries) was an oil well service company founded by Marvin Gearhart and Harrold Owen in 1955 and based in Fort Worth, Texas, United States. It provided well logging and well perforating services to both domestic and international customers.

On February 24, 1988, it was announced that Gearhart was entering into a buyout agreement with oilfield service giant Halliburton Company. Within Halliburton, it was merged with Welex Jet Services to become Halliburton Logging Services.
