= Santa Fe, Oklahoma =

Santa Fe
- Unincorporated community
- Location within the state of Oklahoma Santa Fe (the United States)
- Coordinates: 34°25′11″N 97°41′33″W
- Country: United States
- State: Oklahoma
- County: Stephens
- Elevation: 1,099 ft (335 m)
- Time zone: UTC-6 (Central (CST))
  - Summer (DST): UTC-5 (CDT)
- GNIS feature ID: 1100814

Santa Fe is an unincorporated community in Stephens County, Oklahoma, United States. The elevation is 1,099 feet.
