= Stephens County, Oklahoma =

County in Oklahoma, United States

- County
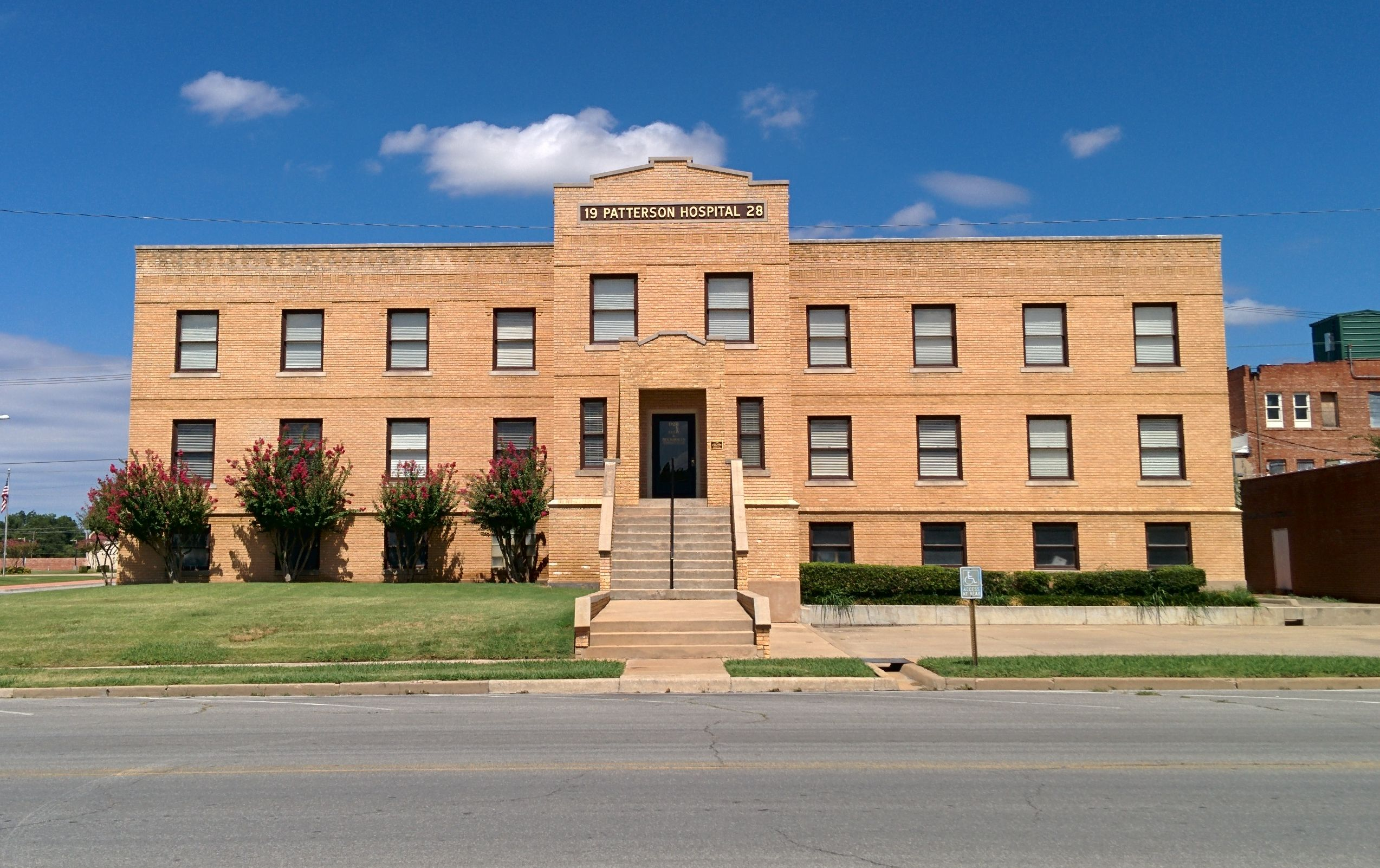
- Patterson Hospital in Duncan (2014)

- Location within the U.S. state of Oklahoma
- Coordinates: 34°29′N 97°52′W
- Country: United States
- State: Oklahoma
- Founded: 1907
- Named for: John Hall Stephens
- Seat: Duncan
- Largest city: Duncan

Area
  - Total: 891 sq mi (2,310 km^{2})
  - Land: 870 sq mi (2,300 km^{2})
  - Water: 21 sq mi (54 km^{2}) 2.4%

Population (2020)
  - Total: 42,848
  - Estimate (2025): 44,310 ▲
  - Density: 49/sq mi (19/km^{2})
- Congressional district: 4th
- Website: www.stephenscountyok.com

Stephens County is a county located in the U.S. state of Oklahoma. As of the 2020 census, its population was 42,848. Its county seat is Duncan. The county was created at statehood, partly from the Chickasaw Nation in Indian Territory and partly from Comanche County in Oklahoma Territory. It was named for Texas politician John Hall Stephens.

Stephens County comprises the Duncan, OK micropolitan statistical area.

== History ==
Stephens County was created at statehood from portions of both Oklahoma Territory and Indian Territory. About two-thirds of the area came from Pickens County, Chickasaw Nation, in the Indian Territory, and the western third came from Comanche County, Oklahoma Territory. The town of Duncan was designated as the county seat. County offices were located in rented facilities in Duncan until the first courthouse was built in 1921. That building was replaced by a new facility in 1967.

Drilling for oil and gas began about 1910. The first production well did not come in until 1918. Production support activities soon followed. Erle P. Halliburton founded the Halliburton Oil Well Cementing Company in Duncan. The company has since grown into a multinational corporation with headquarters in Dubai and Houston, Texas.

== Geography ==
According to the U.S. Census Bureau, the county has a total area of 891 square miles (2,310 km^{2}), of which 21 square miles (54 km^{2}) (2.4%) are covered by water. It lies within the Red Bed plains. Although no major river is in the county, some creeks provide drainage. Wildhorse Creek in the eastern part flows into the Washita River. Beaver Creek in the western part of the county flows into the Red River. Lakes in the county include Lake Humphreys, Clear Creek Lake, Duncan Lake, Comanche Lake, and Waurika Lake.

=== Adjacent counties ===
- Grady County (north)
- Garvin County (northeast)
- Carter County (southeast)
- Jefferson County (south)
- Cotton County (southwest)
- Comanche County (northwest)

== Demographics ==
Historical population
Census	Pop.	Note	%±
1910	22,252		—
1920	24,692		11.0%
1930	33,069		33.9%
1940	31,090		−6.0%
1950	34,071		9.6%
1960	37,990		11.5%
1970	35,902		−5.5%
1980	43,419		20.9%
1990	42,299		−2.6%
2000	43,182		2.1%
2010	45,048		4.3%
2020	42,848		−4.9%
2025 (est.)	44,310	▲	3.4%
U.S. Decennial Census; 1790-1960 1900-1990; 1990-2000 2010

=== 2017–2021 estimates ===
According to 2017-2021 census estimates, its median household income was $53,470 with a poverty rate of 18.9%.

=== 2020 census ===
As of the 2020 census, the county had a population of 42,848. Of the residents, 23.2% were under the age of 18 and 21.2% were 65 years of age or older; the median age was 42.1 years. For every 100 females there were 95.1 males, and for every 100 females age 18 and over there were 92.9 males.

The racial makeup of the county was 78.1% White, 1.9% Black or African American, 5.1% American Indian and Alaska Native, 0.6% Asian, 3.1% from some other race, and 11.1% from two or more races. Hispanic or Latino residents of any race comprised 8.1% of the population.

There were 17,268 households in the county, of which 29.7% had children under the age of 18 living with them and 25.5% had a female householder with no spouse or partner present. About 27.8% of all households were made up of individuals and 13.8% had someone living alone who was 65 years of age or older.

There were 20,322 housing units, of which 15.0% were vacant. Among occupied housing units, 70.9% were owner-occupied and 29.1% were renter-occupied. The homeowner vacancy rate was 3.2% and the rental vacancy rate was 14.7%.

=== 2000 census ===
As of the census of 2000, 43,182 people, 17,463 households, and 12,590 families were residing in the county. The population density was 19/km^{2} (49/mi^{2}). There were 19,854 housing units at an average density of 9/km^{2} (23/mi^{2}). The racial makeup of the county was 88.37% White, 2.20% Black or African American, 4.92% Native American, 0.30% Asian, 0.03% Pacific Islander, 1.44% from other races, and 2.74% from two or more races; 3.96% of the population were Hispanic or Latino of any race.

In 2000, there were 17,463 households, out of which 30.40% had children under the age of 18 living with them, 59.50% were married couples living together, 9.20% had a female householder with no husband present, and 27.90% were non-families. 25.30% of all households were made up of individuals, and 12.80% had someone living alone who was 65 years of age or older. The average household size was 2.44 and the average family size was 2.91. In the county, the population was spread out, with 24.60% under the age of 18, 7.80% from 18 to 24, 25.10% from 25 to 44, 24.00% from 45 to 64, and 18.50% who were 65 years of age or older. The median age was 40 years. For every 100 females there were 93.70 males. For every 100 females age 18 and over, there were 89.70 males.

In 2000, the median income for a household in the county was $30,709, and the median income for a family was $36,371. Males had a median income of $30,428 versus $20,055 for females. The per capita income for the county was $16,357. About 11.60% of families and 14.60% of the population were below the poverty line, including 19.50% of those under age 18 and 11.90% of those age 65 or over.

== Politics ==
Voter Registration and Party Enrollment as of June 30, 2023
Party	Number of Voters	Percentage
Democratic	5,854	21.71%
Republican	16,996	63.04%
Others	4,112	15.25%
Total	26,962	100%

United States presidential election results for Stephens County, Oklahoma
Year	Republican		Democratic		Third party(ies)	
Year	No.	%	No.	%	No.	%
1908	725	23.21%	1,761	56.37%	638	20.42%
1912	598	18.41%	1,735	53.42%	915	28.17%
1916	607	15.00%	2,343	57.88%	1,098	27.12%
1920	2,035	39.16%	2,816	54.19%	346	6.66%
1924	2,377	31.55%	4,745	62.98%	412	5.47%
1928	5,192	62.71%	2,982	36.02%	105	1.27%
1932	1,012	11.61%	7,706	88.39%	0	0.00%
1936	1,636	20.27%	6,390	79.17%	45	0.56%
1940	2,989	32.59%	6,149	67.04%	34	0.37%
1944	2,766	30.82%	6,189	68.97%	19	0.21%
1948	1,909	22.17%	6,702	77.83%	0	0.00%
1952	6,461	44.59%	8,029	55.41%	0	0.00%
1956	6,324	45.67%	7,524	54.33%	0	0.00%
1960	8,084	53.95%	6,899	46.05%	0	0.00%
1964	5,323	36.47%	9,272	63.53%	0	0.00%
1968	5,508	38.46%	5,249	36.65%	3,566	24.90%
1972	10,309	71.61%	3,623	25.17%	464	3.22%
1976	7,099	41.71%	9,795	57.55%	126	0.74%
1980	10,199	57.13%	7,191	40.28%	462	2.59%
1984	12,871	66.58%	6,359	32.89%	103	0.53%
1988	9,844	55.32%	7,833	44.02%	118	0.66%
1992	7,085	34.61%	7,644	37.34%	5,742	28.05%
1996	8,144	45.81%	7,248	40.77%	2,384	13.41%
2000	10,860	62.10%	6,467	36.98%	161	0.92%
2004	13,646	71.22%	5,515	28.78%	0	0.00%
2008	14,394	76.03%	4,538	23.97%	0	0.00%
2012	12,908	76.62%	3,939	23.38%	0	0.00%
2016	14,182	79.21%	3,086	17.24%	636	3.55%
2020	15,560	81.65%	3,154	16.55%	343	1.80%
2024	15,092	81.05%	3,236	17.38%	292	1.57%

== Communities ==
=== Cities ===
- Comanche
- Duncan (county seat)
- Marlow

=== Towns ===
- Bray
- Central High
- Empire City
- Velma
- Loco

=== Census-designated place ===
- Meridian (former)
- Sunray

=== Other unincorporated places ===
- Alma
- Corum
- Santa Fe

== See also ==
- National Register of Historic Places listings in Stephens County, Oklahoma
