= Brittain-Garvin House =

- Brittain--Garvin House
- U.S. National Register of Historic Places
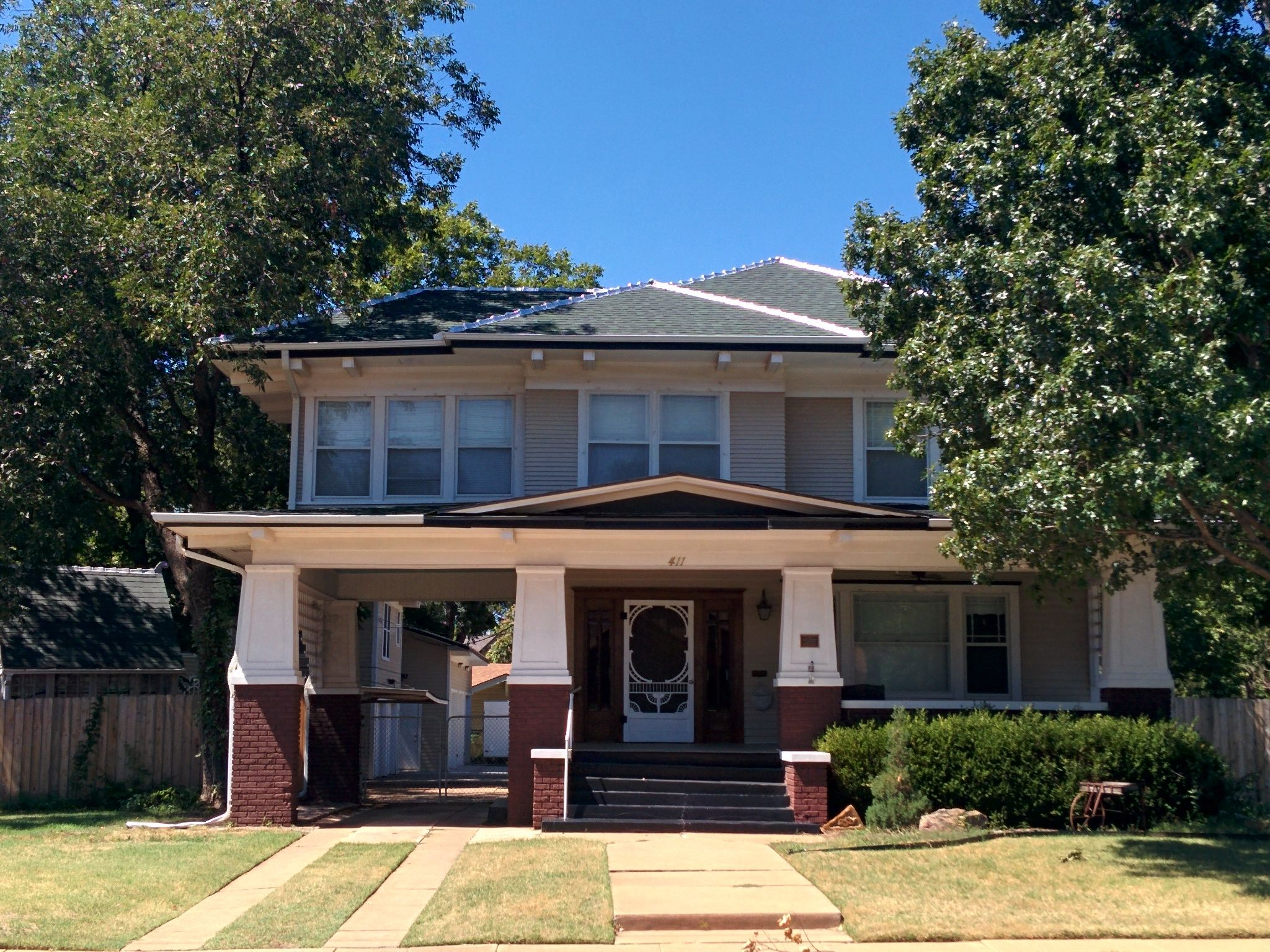

- Location within Oklahoma
- Location: 411 North 9th St., Duncan, Oklahoma
- Coordinates: 34°30′26″N 97°57′27″W
- Area: less than one acre
- Built: c.1916; 110 years ago, c.1931; 95 years ago, c.1937; 89 years ago
- Architectural style: Prairie School
- NRHP reference No.: 00001039
- Added to NRHP: August 31, 2000

The Brittain-Garvin House, at 411 North 9th St. in Duncan, Oklahoma, was built around 1916. It was listed on the National Register of Historic Places in 2000. The listing included three contributing buildings and a contributing object.

It is a two-story, Prairie School house. It is roughly L-shaped and has a porte cochere. The house was expanded and wooden awnings were added around 1937. It is named after its first owner, dry goods merchant Walter Brittain, who lived with his family at the house during the 1920's.
