= H.C. Chrislip House =

- H. C. Chrislip House
- U.S. National Register of Historic Places
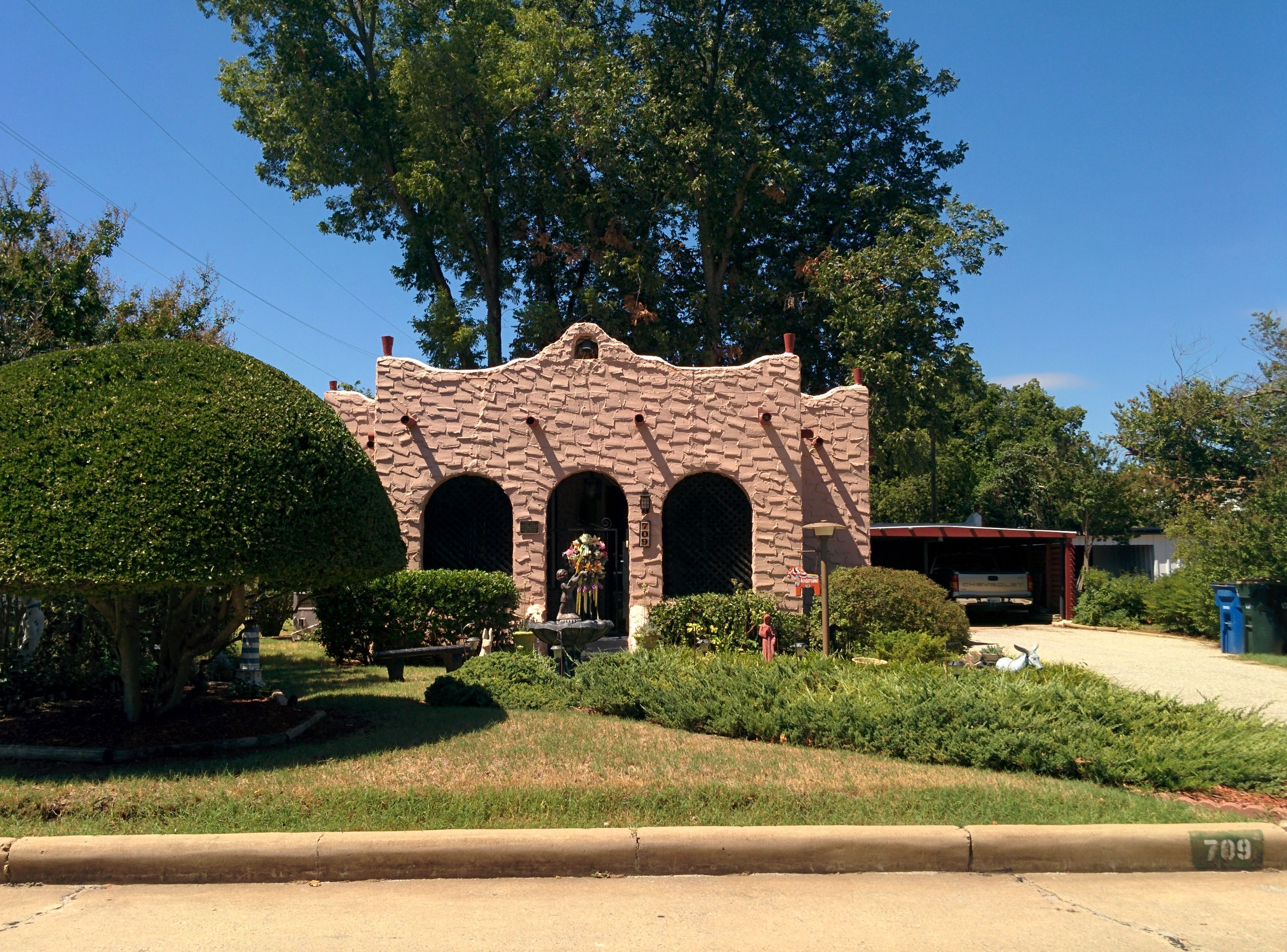

- Location within Oklahoma Location within the United States
- Location: 709 N. 14th St., Duncan, Oklahoma
- Coordinates: 34°30′40″N 97°57′53″W
- Area: less than one acre
- Built: 1928
- Architect: David Robert Gray
- Architectural style: Mission/Spanish Revival
- NRHP reference No.: 93000677
- Added to NRHP: August 6, 1993

The H. C. Chrislip House, at 709 N. 14th St. in Duncan, Oklahoma, was built in 1928. It was listed on the National Register of Historic Places in 1993.

It is a concrete, stucco-clad house, the first house in Mission Revival style which was designed by local architect David Robert Gray.
