= Velma, Oklahoma =

- Town
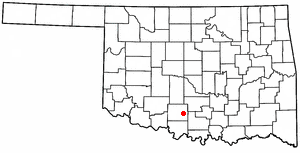
- Location of Velma, Oklahoma
- Coordinates: 34°27′17″N 97°39′44″W
- Country: United States
- State: Oklahoma
- County: Stephens

Area
  - Total: 1.36 sq mi (3.53 km^{2})
  - Land: 1.35 sq mi (3.50 km^{2})
  - Water: 0.0077 sq mi (0.02 km^{2})
- Elevation: 1,040 ft (320 m)

Population (2020)
  - Total: 554
  - Density: 409.4/sq mi (158.06/km^{2})
- Time zone: UTC-6 (Central (CST))
  - Summer (DST): UTC-5 (CDT)
- ZIP code: 73491
- Area code: 580
- FIPS code: 40-76900
- GNIS feature ID: 2413425

Velma is a town in Stephens County, Oklahoma, United States. As of the 2020 census, Velma had a population of 554.

== History ==
A post office was established at Velma, Indian Territory on September 25, 1886. It was named for Velma Dobbins, daughter of a local merchant and longtime resident.

At the time of its founding, Velma was located in Pickens County, Chickasaw Nation.

== Geography ==
According to the United States Census Bureau, the town has a total area of 1.4 square miles (3.6 km^{2}), all land.

Velma is home of the "Annual Old Settler's Picnic and Rodeo", which, since statehood, has been held on the first weekend of August with few interruptions. The event is known for attracting the best Calf Ropers in the United States.

== Demographics ==
Historical population
Census	Pop.	Note	%±
1970	611		—
1980	831		36.0%
1990	661		−20.5%
2000	771		16.6%
2010	620		−19.6%
2020	554		−10.6%
U.S. Decennial Census

=== 2020 census ===
As of the 2020 census, Velma had a population of 554. The median age was 38.6 years. 29.1% of residents were under the age of 18 and 17.1% of residents were 65 years of age or older. For every 100 females there were 85.3 males, and for every 100 females age 18 and over there were 80.3 males age 18 and over.

0.0% of residents lived in urban areas, while 100.0% lived in rural areas.

There were 209 households in Velma, of which 40.7% had children under the age of 18 living in them. Of all households, 55.0% were married-couple households, 9.1% were households with a male householder and no spouse or partner present, and 27.8% were households with a female householder and no spouse or partner present. About 21.5% of all households were made up of individuals and 11.5% had someone living alone who was 65 years of age or older.

There were 243 housing units, of which 14.0% were vacant. The homeowner vacancy rate was 0.0% and the rental vacancy rate was 20.6%.

Racial composition as of the 2020 census
Race	Number	Percent
White	446	80.5%
Black or African American	0	0.0%
American Indian and Alaska Native	23	4.2%
Asian	0	0.0%
Native Hawaiian and Other Pacific Islander	0	0.0%
Some other race	12	2.2%
Two or more races	73	13.2%
Hispanic or Latino (of any race)	24	4.3%

=== 2000 census ===
As of the census of 2000, there were 664 people, 247 households, and 187 families residing in the town. The population density was 470.6 inhabitants per square mile (181.7/km^{2}). There were 290 housing units at an average density of 205.5 per square mile (79.3/km^{2}). The racial makeup of the town was 90.96% White, 8.28% Native American, 0.30% from other races, and 0.45% from two or more races. Hispanic or Latino of any race were 1.05% of the population.

There were 247 households, out of which 40.5% had children under the age of 18 living with them, 60.3% were married couples living together, 12.1% had a female householder with no husband present, and 23.9% were non-families. 21.5% of all households were made up of individuals, and 10.1% had someone living alone who was 65 years of age or older. The average household size was 2.69 and the average family size was 3.15.

In the town, the population was spread out, with 29.1% under the age of 18, 8.0% from 18 to 24, 28.5% from 25 to 44, 22.3% from 45 to 64, and 12.2% who were 65 years of age or older. The median age was 35 years. For every 100 females, there were 97.0 males. For every 100 females age 18 and over, there were 87.6 males.

The median income for a household in the town was $30,341, and the median income for a family was $34,286. Males had a median income of $32,083 versus $16,136 for females. The per capita income for the town was $12,010. About 16.3% of families and 17.8% of the population were below the poverty line, including 21.7% of those under age 18 and 15.8% of those age 65 or over.

== Notable person ==
Joe Diffie, country singer-songwriter
