= Halliburton =

American multinational corporation

Halliburton Company
- Type: Public
- Traded as: NYSE: HAL; S&P 500 component
- Industry: Oil and gas
- Founded: 1919; 107 years ago, in Duncan, Oklahoma, U.S.
- Founder: Erle P. Halliburton
- Headquarters: Houston, Texas, and Dubai, UAE
- Area served: Worldwide
- Key people: Jeff Miller (chairman, president, CEO)
- Revenue: ▼US$22.9 billion (2024)
- Operating income: ▼US$3.82 billion (2024)
- Net income: ▼US$2.51 billion (2024)
- Total assets: ▲US$25.6 billion (2024)
- Total equity: ▲US$10.5 billion (2024)
- Number of employees: 48,000 (2024)
- Website: halliburton.com

Halliburton Company is an American multinational corporation and the world's second-largest oil service company, responsible for most of the world's fracking operations. The company, incorporated in the United States, has dual headquarters located in Houston and in Dubai.

Halliburton's major business segment is the Energy Services Group (ESG).

The company has been criticized for its involvement in numerous controversies, including its involvement with Dick Cheney – as U.S. Secretary of Defense, then CEO of the company, then vice president of the United States – and the Iraq War, and the Deepwater Horizon, for which it agreed to settle outstanding legal claims against it by paying litigants $1.1 billion. In 2015, Halliburton was found guilty in court for illegal retaliation against a whistleblower who filed a report with the SEC over concerns that the company was illegally concealing billions of dollars. The company has also been criticized for refusing to comply with United States Environmental Protection Agency requests for transparency around chemicals it uses in hydraulic fracturing.

Jeff Miller was promoted to President of Halliburton on August 1, 2014, and CEO on June 1, 2017, replacing Dave Lesar.

== Business overview ==
=== Locations ===
The company has multiple headquarters located in Houston and in Dubai, but it remains incorporated in the United States of America.

=== Divisions ===
Energy services (the company's historical cornerstone), formation evaluation, digital and consulting services, production volume optimization, and fluid systems are the major business segments.

With the acquisition of Dresser Industries in 1998, the Kellogg-Brown & Root division (in 2002 renamed to KBR) was formed by merging Halliburton's Brown & Root (acquired 1962) subsidiary and the M.W. Kellogg division of Dresser (which Dresser had merged within 1988). Asbestos-related litigation from the Kellogg acquisition caused the company to book more than US $4.0 billion in losses from 2002 through 2004. As a result of the asbestos-related costs and staggering losses on the Barracuda Caratinga FPSO construction project based in Rio de Janeiro, Brazil, Halliburton lost approximately $900 million U.S. a year from 2002 through 2004. A final non-appealable settlement in the asbestos case was reached in January 2005 which allowed Halliburton subsidiary KBR to exit Chapter 11 bankruptcy and returned the company to quarterly profitability. While Halliburton's revenues have increased because of its contracts in the Middle East, the overall impact on its bottom line has been mixed.

KBR became a separately listed company on April 5, 2007.

== History ==
=== Early history (as HOWCO) ===
The company was started in 1919 by Erle P. Halliburton as the New Method Oil Well Cementing Company.

Halliburton Research Center in Duncan, Oklahoma, the city which was the original headquarters of Halliburton Company

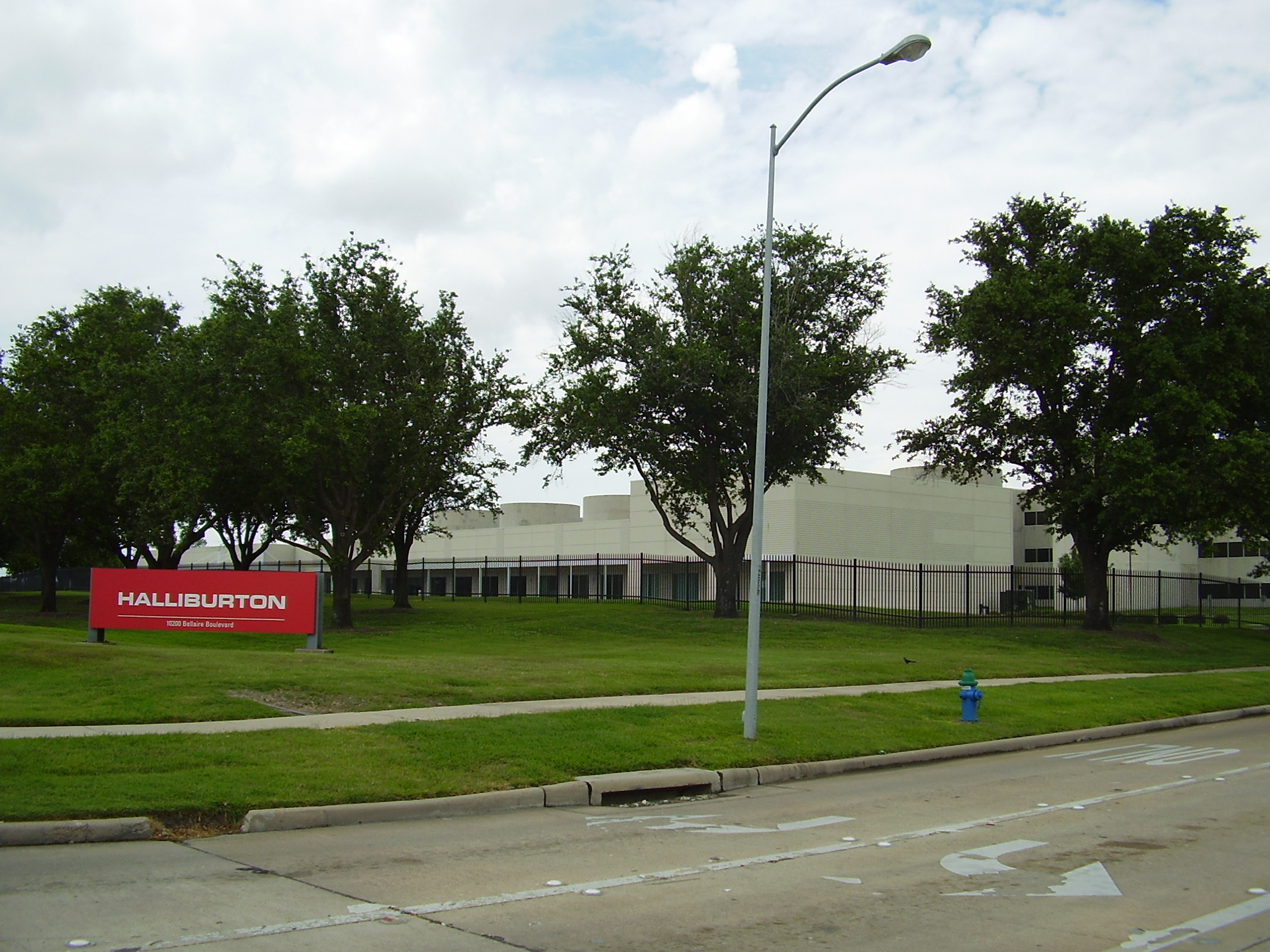
Halliburton (Oak Park) offices in Westchase and in Chinatown in Houston

In 1920, he brought a wild gas well under control, using cement, for W.G. Skelly, near Wilson, Oklahoma. On March 1, 1921, the Halliburton "method and means of excluding water from oil wells" was assigned a patent from the U.S. Patent Office. Halliburton invented the revolutionary cement jet mixer, to eliminate hand-mixing of cement, and the measuring line, a tool used to guarantee cementing accuracy. By 1922, the Halliburton Oil Well Cementing Company (HOWCO) was prospering from the Mexia, Texas oil boom, having cemented its 500th well in late summer.

In 1924, the company was incorporated in Delaware, with 56 people on its payroll. The stock of the corporation was owned by Erle and Vida Halliburton and by seven major oil companies: Magnolia, Texas, Gulf, Humble, Sun, Pure and Atlantic.

In 1926, its first foreign venture began with sale of equipment to Burma and India.

Throughout the 1930s and 1940s, Halliburton continued cementing across America. In 1938, Halliburton cemented its first offshore well using a truck on a barge off the Louisiana coast. In 1940, Halliburton opened offices in Venezuela and introduced bulk handling of cementing to the industry. In 1947, the Halliburton first marine cementing vessel went into service.

In 1951, Halliburton first appeared in Europe as Halliburton Italiana SpA, a wholly owned subsidiary in Italy. Over the next seven years, Halliburton launched Halliburton Company Germany GmbH, set up operations in Argentina and established a subsidiary in England. By 1951, HOWCO had service centers operating in Canada, Venezuela, Peru, Colombia, Saudi Arabia and Indonesia. Halliburton revenues topped $100 million for the first time in 1952.

Erle P. Halliburton died in Los Angeles in 1957. HOWCO is at this time worth $190 million with camps all over the world. The same year, HOWCO purchased Welex, which pioneered jet perforation. Otis Engineering, an oil field service and equipment company specializing in manufacturing pressure control equipment for oil and gas producing wells, was acquired in 1959.

=== As Halliburton ===
On July 5, 1961, the company changed its name to the Halliburton Company. In 1963, Halliburton was the first company in Oklahoma to receive the Presidential "E" (for Export) flag in recognition of notable contributions to foreign trade.

Halliburton opened a 500,000 sq ft (46,000 m^{2}) manufacturing center in Duncan, Oklahoma, in 1964. The company began to experiment with new technologies to help their services – for example, beginning in 1965 a pilot operation of a computer network system – the first such installation in the oilfield services industry. In 1966, workers broke ground for a new wing at the Research Center in Duncan that tripled the available space for the Chemical Research and Design Department.

In 1968, an automated mixing system for drilling mud was developed by Halliburton, primarily for use offshore. Gearhart Industries (acquired by Halliburton Energy Services in 1989) introduced the first digital computer logging system in 1974.

In 1969, Halliburton began construction of a base camp at Prudhoe Bay on Alaska's North Slope.

In 1975, it responded to environmental concerns by working with the nonprofit Clean Gulf Associates to contain and clean up oil spills. In 1976, Halliburton established the Halliburton Energy Institute in Duncan, Oklahoma, to provide an industry forum for disseminating technical information.

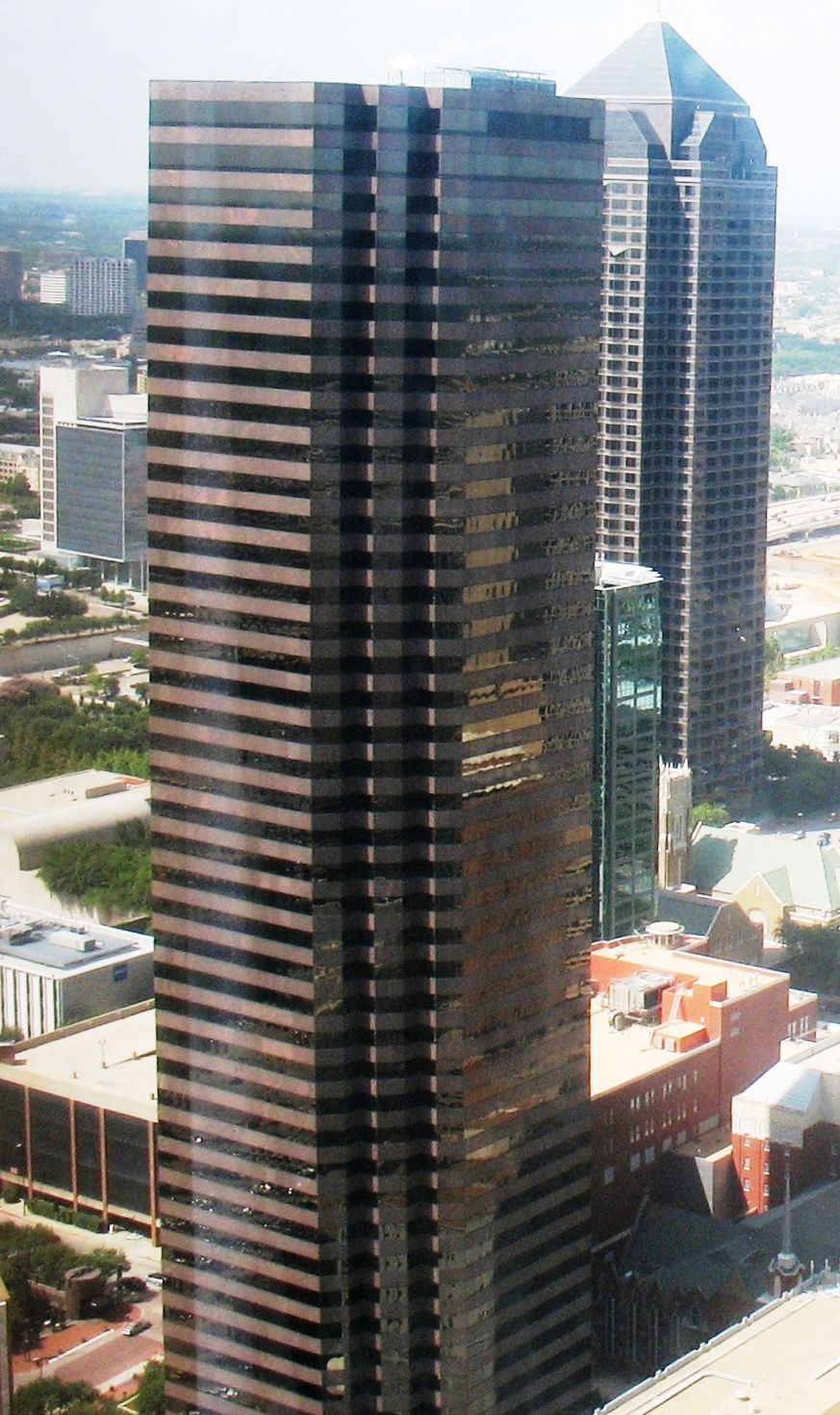
Lincoln Plaza in Downtown Dallas, which at one time housed the Halliburton headquarters

In 1980, Halliburton Research Center opened in Duncan, Oklahoma. The company's billionth sack of cement for customers was pumped in 1983. In 1989, Halliburton acquired logging and perforating specialist company Gearhart Industries and combined it with its subsidiary Welex to form Halliburton Logging Services.

Throughout the 1980s, Halliburton's subsidiaries continued their projects around the world (under management of former CEO Brian Darcy) even in countries once considered enemies. Equipment was provided for the first multiwell platform offshore China, and an Otis Engineering team controlled a gigantic Tengiz field blowout in the Soviet Union.

=== 1990s ===
Following the end of Operation Desert Storm in February 1991, the Pentagon, led by then defense secretary Dick Cheney, paid Halliburton subsidiary Brown & Root Services over $8.5 million to study the use of private military forces with American soldiers in combat zones. Halliburton crews also helped bring 725 burning oil wells under control in Kuwait.

In 1995, Cheney replaced Thomas H. Cruikshank, as chairman and CEO. Cruikshank had served since 1989.

In the early 1990s, Halliburton was found to be in violation of federal trade barriers in Iraq and Libya, having sold these countries dual-use oil drilling equipment and, through its former subsidiary, Halliburton Logging Services, sending six pulse neutron generators to Libya. After having pleaded guilty, the company was fined $1.2 million, with another $2.61 million in penalties.

During the Balkans conflict in the 1990s, Kellogg Brown-Root (KBR) supported U.S. peacekeeping forces in Bosnia and Herzegovina, Croatia and Hungary with food, laundry, transportation, and other life-cycle management services.

In 1998, Halliburton merged with Dresser Industries, which included Kellogg. Prescott Bush was a director of Dresser Industries, which is now part of Halliburton; his son, former president George H. W. Bush, worked for Dresser Industries in several positions from 1948 to 1951, before he founded Zapata Corporation.

=== 2000s ===
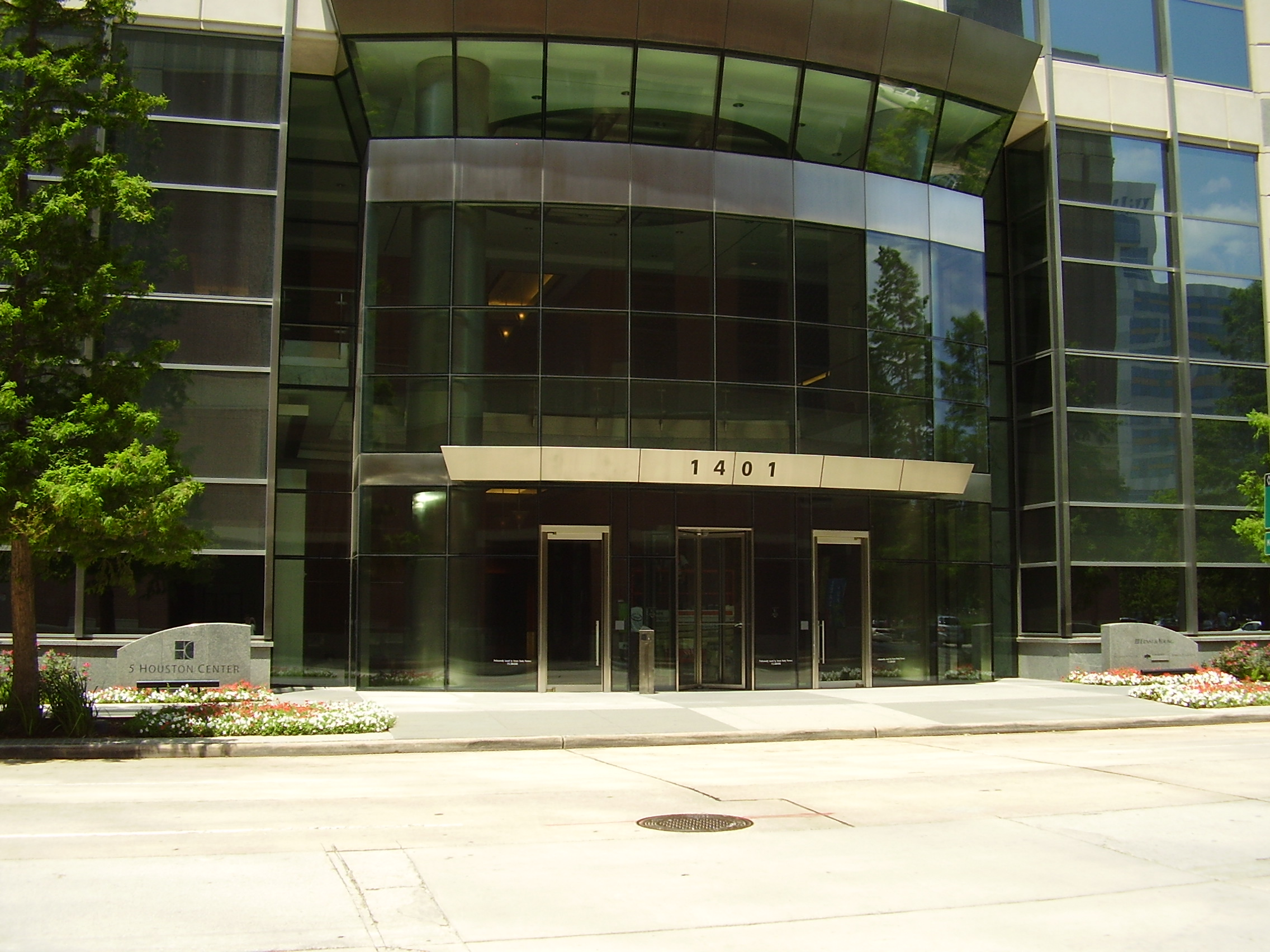
5 Houston Center in Downtown Houston, which at one time housed the headquarters of Halliburton

The Wall Street Journal reported in 2001 that a subsidiary of Halliburton Energy Services called Halliburton Products and Services Ltd. (HPS) opened an office in Tehran. The company, HPS, operated on the ninth floor of a new north Tehran tower block. Although HPS was incorporated in the Cayman Islands in 1975 and is "non-American", it shares both the logo and name of Halliburton Energy Services and, according to Dow Jones Newswires, offers services from Halliburton units worldwide through its Tehran office. Such behavior, undertaken while senior Republican (later U.S. vice president) Dick Cheney was CEO of Halliburton, may have violated the Trading with the Enemy Act. A Halliburton spokesman, responding to inquiries from Dow Jones, said "This is not breaking any laws. This is a foreign subsidiary and no U.S. person is involved in this. No U.S. person is facilitating any transaction. We are not performing directly in that country." No legal action has been taken against the company or its officials. Later, David J. Lesar, Halliburton's chief executive, announced that Halliburton would withdraw from Iran.

In April 2002, KBR was awarded a $7 million contract to construct steel holding cells at Camp X-Ray.

In November 2002, KBR was tasked to plan oil well firefighting in Iraq, and in February 2003 was issued a contract to conduct the work. Critics contend that it was a no-bid contract, awarded due to Dick Cheney's position as vice president. Concern was also expressed that the contract could allow KBR to pump and distribute Iraqi oil. Others contend, however, that this was not strictly a no-bid contract, and was invoked under a contract that KBR won "in a competitive bid process." The contract, referred to as LOGCAP, is a contingency-based contract that is invoked at the convenience of the Army. Because the contract is essentially a retainer, specific orders are not competitively bid (as the overall contract was).

In May 2003, Halliburton revealed in SEC filings that its KBR subsidiary had paid a Nigerian official $2.4 million in bribes in order to receive favorable tax treatment., In October 2004, after emerging from the bankruptcy protection, Halliburton opened a new 250,000-square-foot (23,000 m^{2}) facility on 35 acres (140,000 m^{2}), replacing an older facility that opened in 1948, in Rock Springs, Wyoming. With over 500 employees, Halliburton is one of the largest private employers in Sweetwater County.

On January 24, 2006, Halliburton's subsidiary KBR (formerly Kellogg, Brown and Root) announced that it had been awarded a $385 million contingency contract by the Department of Homeland Security to build "temporary detention and processing facilities" or internment camps. According to Business Wire, this contract will be executed in cooperation with the U.S. Army Corps of Engineers, Fort Worth District. Critics point to the Guantanamo Bay detention camp as a possible model. According to a press release posted on the Halliburton website, "The contract, which is effective immediately, provides for establishing temporary detention and processing capabilities to augment existing Immigration and Customs Enforcement (ICE) Detention and Removal Operations (DRO) Program facilities in the event of an emergency influx of immigrants into the U.S., or to support the rapid development of new programs. The contingency support contract provides for planning and, if required, initiation of specific engineering, construction and logistics support tasks to establish, operate and maintain one or more expansion facilities."

In February 2008, a hard disk and two computers containing classified information were stolen from Petrobras while in Halliburton's custody. Allegedly, the content inside the stolen material was data on the recently discovered Tupi oil field. Initial police inquiries suggest that it could be a common container theft operation. The container was a ramshackle in complete disorder indicating that thieves were after "valuables and not only laptops," said an expert consulted by the daily newspaper Folha de S. Paulo.

In 2008, Halliburton agreed to outsource its mission-critical information technology infrastructure to a Dallas/Fort Worth Metroplex data center operated by CyrusOne Networks LLC.

On May 14, 2010, President Barack Obama said in an interview with CNN that "you had executives of BP and Transocean and Halliburton falling over each other to point the finger of blame at somebody else" when referring to the congressional hearings held during the Deepwater Horizon oil spill. "The American people could not have been impressed with that display, and I certainly wasn't." According to Tim Probert, executive vice president of Halliburton, "Halliburton, as a service provider to the well owner, is contractually bound to comply with the well owner's instructions".

It was anticipated that Halliburton's $2.5 billion "Restore Iraqi Oil" (RIO) contract would pay for itself as well as for reconstruction of the entire country. Plans called for more oil to be exported from Iraq's northern oil fields than actually occurred. Halliburton's work on the pipeline crossing the Tigris river at Al Fatah has been called a failure. Critics claim that the oil fields are barely usable and access to international markets is severely limited. As an example, against the advice of its own experts, Halliburton attempted to dig a tunnel through a geological fault zone. The underground terrain was a jumble of boulders, voids, cobblestones, and gravel and not appropriate for the kind of drilling Halliburton planned. "No driller in his right mind would have gone ahead," said Army geologist Robert Sanders when the military finally sent people to inspect the work. A report by the Special Inspector General for Iraq Reconstruction found that only 28% of the required drilling had been completed when the $75 million marked for the project was spent.

=== Proposed acquisition of Baker Hughes ===
On November 17, 2014, Halliburton and Baker Hughes jointly announced a definitive agreement under which Halliburton would, subject to the conditions set forth in the agreement, acquire Baker Hughes in a stock and cash transaction valued at $34.6 billion. A press release made available on the former's website, as at December 11, 2014 detailed the restructuring in the integration to follow. The firm announced it would acquire Baker Hughes for around $35 billion in cash and stock, creating an oilfield services company that aims to compete with Schlumberger. Prior to the merger of Baker Hughes and Halliburton, Halliburton must divest over $5 billion of its assets according to the regulations created by US competition enforcement authorities. The merger had a deadline of the end of April 2016 after which, if a decision had not been made, both companies could walk away from the deal if they chose. At the beginning of May 2016, the day after the deadline expired, Halliburton and Baker Hughes announced the termination of the merger agreement.

=== Chemical plant in Saudi Arabia ===
On March 1, 2022, Halliburton inaugurated its MultiChem facility in Jubail PlasChem Park, Saudi Arabia. Manufacturing a broad range of chemicals for oil and gas industries, the move is expected to allow Saudi Arabia to pivot from its role as an importer of specialty products to an exporter in the region.

== Controversies and criticism ==
=== Iraq War ===
Halliburton has become the object of several controversies involving the Iraq War and the company's ties to former U.S. Vice President Dick Cheney. Cheney retired from the company during the 2000 U.S. presidential election campaign with a severance package worth $36 million. As of 2004, he had received $398,548 in deferred compensation from Halliburton while Vice President. Cheney was chairman and CEO of Halliburton Company from 1995 to 2000, and received stock options from Halliburton.

In the run-up to the Iraq War, Halliburton was awarded a $7 billion contract for which only Halliburton was allowed to bid.

Bunnatine Greenhouse, a civil servant with 20 years of contracting experience, had complained to Army officials on numerous occasions that Halliburton had been unlawfully receiving special treatment for work in Iraq, Kuwait and the Balkans. Criminal investigations were opened by the U.S. Justice Department, the Federal Bureau of Investigation (FBI) and the Pentagon's inspector general.

In one of Greenhouse's claims, she said that military auditors caught Halliburton overcharging the Pentagon for fuel deliveries into Iraq. She also claimed that Defense Secretary Donald Rumsfeld's office took control of every aspect of Halliburton's $7 billion Iraqi oil/infrastructure contract. Greenhouse was later demoted for poor performance in her position. Greenhouse's attorney, Michael Kohn, portrayed her performance reviews as punishment for criticizing the administrations. He stated in The New York Times that "she is being demoted because of her strict adherence to procurement requirements and the Army's preference to sidestep them when it suits their needs."

=== Deepwater Horizon explosion ===
An internal report released in 2010 by BP into the Deepwater Horizon explosion claimed that poor practices of Halliburton staff had contributed to the disaster. Investigations carried out by the National Commission on the BP Deepwater Horizon Oil Spill and Offshore Drilling found that Halliburton was jointly at fault along with BP and Transocean for the spill. The cement that Halliburton used was an unstable mixture, and eventually caused hydrocarbons to leak into the well, causing the explosion that started the crisis.

Halliburton pleaded guilty to destroying evidence after the April 2010 Deepwater Horizon disaster; the company destroyed computer simulations it performed in the months after the accident, simulations that contradicted Halliburton's claim that it was BP who had not followed Halliburton's advice. BP had employed Halliburton to oversee the process by which cement is used to seal casing in oil and gas wells, thereby preventing leaks. Government investigators had ordered companies involved in drilling the well to preserve all relevant evidence.

=== Allegations of corruption in Nigeria ===
In early December 2010, the Nigerian government filed corruption charges against Cheney in connection with his role as the chief executive of Halliburton. The case relates to an alleged $182 million contract involving a four-company joint venture to build a liquefied natural gas plant on Bonny Island in southern Nigeria. Earlier in 2009, KBR, a former subsidiary of Halliburton, agreed to pay $402 million after admitting that it bribed Nigerian officials, and Halliburton paid $177 million to settle allegations by the U.S. Securities and Exchange Commission without admitting any wrongdoing. In mid-December 2010, the case was settled when Nigeria agreed to drop the corruption charges against Cheney and Halliburton in exchange for a $250 million settlement. According to Femi Babafemi, the spokesperson for the Economic and Financial Crimes Commission, the $250 million would include approximately $130 million frozen in a Swiss bank, and the rest would be paid as fines.

The Federal Contractor Misconduct Database details 10 instances of misconduct since 1995 under which Halliburton has agreed to pay settlements of $791 million. A further 22 instances of misconduct relate to the company's former subsidiary KBR.

=== Environmental issues ===
In 2002, Toxics Release Inventory (TRI) reports were completed to measure the amount of chemicals emitted from Halliburton's Harris County, Texas facility. The TRI is a publicly available EPA database that contains information on toxic chemical releases and waste management activities reported annually by certain industries as well as federal facilities. The facility had 230 TRI air releases in 2001 and 245 in 2002.

On June 7, 2006, Halliburton's Farmington, New Mexico facility created a toxic cloud that forced people to evacuate their homes.

Halliburton may also be implicated in the oil spills in the Timor Sea off Australia in August 2009 and in the Gulf of Mexico in April 2010 for improper cementing. Halliburton staff were employed on the Transocean operated Deepwater Horizon oil rig in the Mexican Gulf. Halliburton staff completed cementation of the final production well 20 hours prior to the Deepwater Horizon drilling rig explosion, but had not yet set the final.

In July 2013, Halliburton Co agreed to plead guilty to charges that it destroyed evidence relating to the 2010 Deepwater Horizon oil spill. This incurred a $200,000 fine; the firm also agreed to three years of probation and to continue cooperating with the criminal probe into the spill. In September 2014, the company agreed to pay $1.1 billion in damages to settle the majority of claims against it relating to the explosion, removing the uncertainty which had hung over the company for the previous four years.

=== Jamie Leigh Jones incident ===
Jamie Leigh Jones testified at a Congressional hearing that she had been gang-raped by as many as seven co-workers in Iraq in 2005 when she was an employee of KBR, and then falsely imprisoned in a shipping container for 24 hours without food or drink. KBR was a subsidiary of Halliburton at the time. Jones and her lawyers said that 38 women have contacted her reporting similar experiences while working as contractors in Iraq, Kuwait, and other countries. On September 15, 2009, the Fifth Circuit Court of Appeals ruled in favor of Halliburton, in a 2 to 1 ruling, and found that her alleged injuries were not, in fact, in any way related to her employment and thus, not covered by the contract. This decision effectively meant that the mandatory arbitration clause in her contract did not apply.

These incidents have tainted the public perception of Halliburton, with a consumer study rating it as the fifth least reputable company in the United States.

=== Sale of KBR ===
On April 15, 2006, Halliburton filed a registration statement with the Securities and Exchange Commission to sell up to 20 percent of its KBR stock on the NYSE under the ticker symbol "KBR", as part of an eventual plan for KBR to be a separate company from Halliburton.

In November 2006, Halliburton began selling its stake in KBR, its major subsidiary, and by February 2007 had completely sold off the subsidiary. In June 2007, several days after Stewart Bowen, the Special Inspector General, released a new report, the Army announced that KBR would share another $150 billion contract with two other contractors, Fluor and Dyncorp, over the next 10 years.

=== Baghdad incident ===
In accordance with the law of armed conflict and to maintain non-combatant status, Halliburton does not arm its truck drivers. Trucks are often the target of insurgent attacks. On September 20, 2005, a convoy of four Halliburton trucks was ambushed north of Baghdad. All four trucks were struck by improvised explosive devices and were disabled. Their US National Guard escort was thought to have abandoned the disabled vehicles, leaving the drivers defenseless. Three of the four truck drivers were killed by the insurgents while the surviving driver caught the event on video. Although the trucks had military camouflage paint, the drivers were civilian. The US military returned to the scene 45 minutes later. However, in a statement by senior military officials in Iraq, an investigation revealed that troops did not abandon the civilians and they were all exiting the "kill zone" during the ambush.

=== Restatements ===
On March 31, 2003, Management at Halliburton restated earnings downward by $14 million for the fourth quarter of 2002. In the restatement, an additional $3 million expense (net of tax) to continuing operations and an $11 million expense, net of tax, to discontinued operations were recorded. On March 2, 2005, Halliburton restated its 2004 fourth-quarter earnings to add $2 million US in after-tax losses to reflect the collection of a $10 million receivable that had been reserved and a correction in lease accounting.

=== Health impacts ===
Halliburton has been criticized for its impacts on public health and the environment, most notably with the passing of the Energy Policy Act of 2005, also known as the Halliburton loophole. This law notably exempted chemicals used during hydraulic fracturing from the Clean Air Act, Clean Water Act, Safe Drinking Water Act, and CERCLA ("Superfund"). As a result of this, fracking fluids did not have to be reported to the EPA, rendering the EPA unable to legally regulate or monitor them.

In 2020, it was reported that out of nine companies the EPA has asked full disclosure from with regards to the chemicals used in gas drilling, Halliburton was the only one that refused to comply.

=== Illegal retaliation against whistleblower ===
In 2015, after a decade-long legal battle, Halliburton was declared guilty for illegally retaliating against whistleblower Tony Menendez. Menendez had filed a case with the SEC over concerns that Halliburton was taking illegal actions to conceal billions of dollars; following this, Halliburton retaliated against Menendez in a number of ways, including stripping Menendez of his responsibilities and forbidding him from coming to most meetings.

=== Myanmar ===
According to an investigation by journalists, Josy Joseph and Khadija Sharife first published on South Africa-based Barracuda Media, two whistleblowers leaked internal documents from Deutsche Bank. Among the documents were January 2022 correspondences concerning an increase of Halliburton's bond guarantee for Zawtika Oil and Gas Field on behalf of PTTEP International Limited. Deutsche Bank sanctions advisors allegedly warned against the funding as the Tatmadaw-owned Myanma Oil and Gas Enterprise retained 20% of Zawtika's stake. Despite these concerns, the deal went through due to "client confirmation" that the money was not ending up in sanctioned hands.

== Corporate affairs ==
=== Headquarters ===
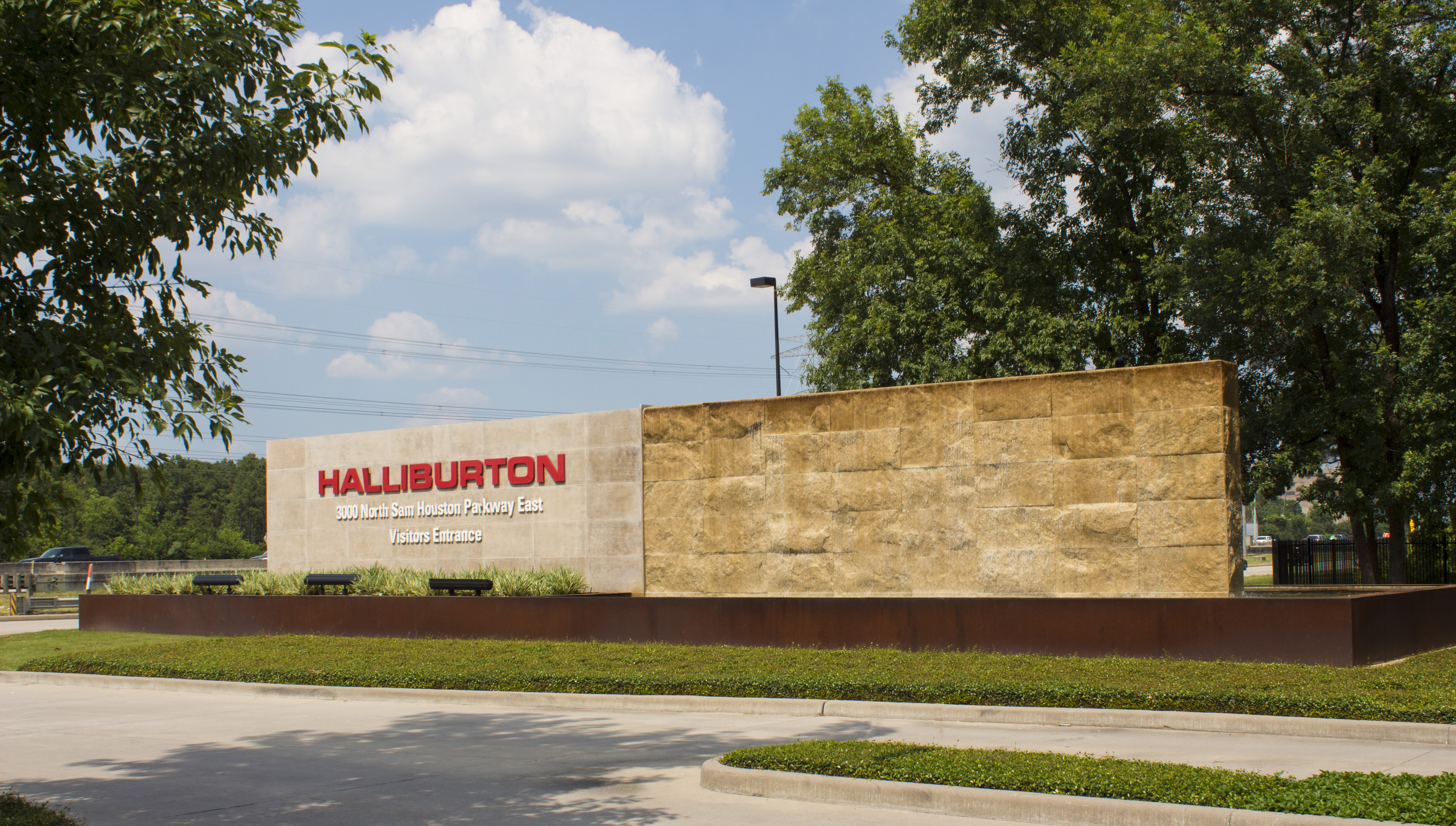
Halliburton headquarters (North Belt Campus) in north Houston

Halliburton's headquarters (North Belt Campus) are located in northern Houston, Texas, near George H.W. Bush Intercontinental Airport.

Halliburton was headquartered in Dallas, Texas, from 1961 to 2003. The company moved its headquarters from the Southland Life Building in Dallas to 50,648 square feet (4,705.4 m^{2}) of space in Lincoln Plaza in Downtown Dallas in 1985. 20 employees worked in Halliburton's headquarters in Dallas.

Halliburton planned to move its headquarters to Houston in 2002. Halliburton, which signed its lease to occupy a portion of 5 Houston Center in Downtown Houston in 2002, moved its headquarters there by July 2003. Halliburton occupied 26,000 square feet (2,400 m^{2}) of space on the 24th floor in 5 Houston Center.

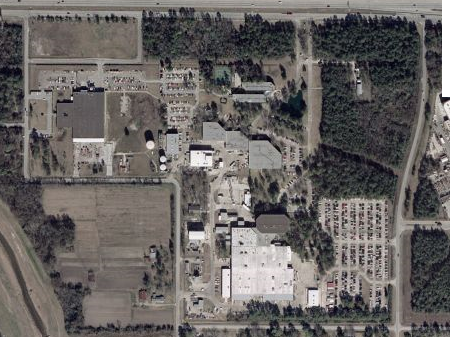
Aerial view of the current Halliburton headquarters (2002)

In 2009 Halliburton announced that it planned to move its headquarters to the North Belt Campus in Houston. In addition it planned to consolidate operations at its Westchase and North Belt Campus. The move occurred in 2009. The 90 acres (36 ha) North Belt complex was to house 2,500 employees. Halliburton planned to add a research and development facility with laboratories, a new cafeteria, a childcare center, two additional parking garages, and fitness and wellness centers for employees. The plans for the North Belt Campus had been delayed by one year: the first phase of expansion and renovation was completed in 2012, and in 2014 new buildings, garage, cafeteria, and fitness centre were completed. The construction of the North Belt administration building is scheduled to begin in late 2010.

According to Marilyn Bayless, the president of the North Houston Greenspoint Chamber of Commerce, in 2003 Halliburton had planned to move operations out of the North Belt office because other area school districts offered the freeport tax exemptions while the Aldine Independent School District (AISD), where the North Belt office is located, did not. In order to attract businesses, in May 2003, AISD began offering the same tax exemption as other jurisdictions. Subsequently, Halliburton retained the North Belt office.

== See also ==
- List of oilfield service companies
- Private military contractor – Company providing armed combat or security services
