= List of United States tornadoes in June 2023 =

United States tornadoes in June 2023
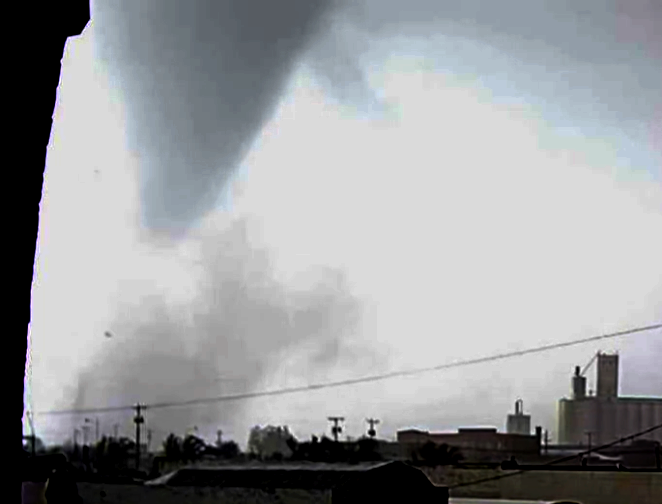
- A deadly EF3 tornado in Perryton, Texas on June 15
- Timespan: June 1–30
- Maximum rated tornado: EF3 tornado: Perryton, Texas on June 15; Louin, Mississippi on June 18; Matador, Texas on June 21; Grenada, Colorado on June 23
- Tornadoes: 261
- Fatalities: 9
- Injuries: 159

This page documents all tornadoes confirmed by various weather forecast offices of the National Weather Service in the United States in June 2023. On average, there are 213 confirmed tornadoes during the month. These tornadoes are commonly focused across the Midwest and the central and northern Great Plains, and occasionally the Northeast, all due to their proximity to the late spring/early summer jet stream which continues to retreat farther north. Additionally, activity can sometimes increase in the Florida Peninsula as a result of early-season tropical activity.

The month began with relatively little tornado activity as there were only a small number of tornado reports in the first 10 days of June and all were weak. Thereafter, an unusual weather pattern for the season developed, with a displaced jet stream for mid-June resulting in multiple rounds of severe weather primarily across the Southern United States, which led to a significant increase in the month's tornado count. The weather pattern then shifted back northward, bringing more rounds of severe and tornadic weather to the Great Plains and Mississippi Valley in late June. During that period, well over 200 tornadoes occurred across the US. Overall, activity for the month finished above average with 261 tornadoes, making June the most active month of 2023 and the most active June since 2014.

== June ==
Confirmed tornadoes by Enhanced Fujita rating
EFU	EF0	EF1	EF2	EF3	EF4	EF5	Total
103	63	67	24	4	0	0	261

=== June 1 event ===
List of confirmed tornadoes – Thursday, June 1, 2023 (Note: All dates are based on the local time zone where the tornado touched down; however, all times are in Coordinated Universal Time for consistency.)
EF#	Location	County / Parish	State	Start Coord.	Time (UTC)	Path length	Max width
EF0	SSW of Peever	Roberts	SD	45.461°N 97.04°W	19:45	0.01 mi (0.016 km)	10 yd (9.1 m)
EF0	A brief landspout tornado that caused no damage was photographed.						
EF0	Bluffdale	Salt Lake	UT	40.4718°N 111.9339°W	21:00	0.75 mi (1.21 km)	67 yd (61 m)
EF0	This weak tornado was photographed and destroyed a pop-up shade tent by an elementary school.						
EFU	SSE of Darien	Walworth	WI	42.5517°N 88.6857°W	00:24–00:25	0.01 mi (0.016 km)	10 yd (9.1 m)
EFU	A trained storm spotter reported a brief landspout tornado. No damage was reported.						
EFU	ENE of Larslan	Daniels	MT	48.6°N 106.01°W	01:56–02:06	1.5 mi (2.4 km)	50 yd (46 m)
EFU	Law enforcement and the public reported a landspout tornado that caused no damage.						

=== June 2 event ===
List of confirmed tornadoes – Friday, June 2, 2023
EF#	Location	County / Parish	State	Start Coord.	Time (UTC)	Path length	Max width
EFU	WSW of Seminole	Gaines	TX	32.666°N 102.996°W	18:29–18:36	0.25 mi (0.40 km)	50 yd (46 m)
EFU	A tornado that lasted less than a minute was documented by storm chasers. No damage occurred.						
EFU	NE of Fort Stockton	Pecos	TX	30.95°N 102.82°W	18:29–18:39	4.41 mi (7.10 km)	25 yd (23 m)
EFU	Several storm chasers reported this tornado that lifted a few minutes after it was reported. The tornado stayed in a rural area as it moved southeast over railroad tracks before lifting prior to crossing FM 2037. No damage occurred.						
EF1	E of Fort Stockton	Pecos	TX	30.87°N 102.66°W	18:57–19:15	2.25 mi (3.62 km)	125 yd (114 m)
EF1	Multiple trees were snapped or uprooted along the path of this tornado.						
EFU	SW of Sheffield	Pecos, Terrell	TX	30.63°N 102.28°W	20:41–21:23	20.5 mi (33.0 km)	25 yd (23 m)
EFU	An eyewitness observed a tornado that did not cause damage.						
EFU	W of Aurora	Hamilton	NE	40.82°N 98.04°W	21:09–21:13	4.86 mi (7.82 km)	40 yd (37 m)
EFU	A landspout tornado caused no damage. The path was estimated by photos and footage of the tornado.						
EFU	E of Marquette	Hamilton	NE	41.01°N 97.98°W	21:29–21:31	1.38 mi (2.22 km)	40 yd (37 m)
EFU	Landspout tornado that caused no damage was observed by an emergency manager.						
EF0	NNW of Central City to NE of Archer	Merrick	NE	41.16°N 98.04°W	21:53–21:58	4.17 mi (6.71 km)	40 yd (37 m)
EF0	A barn had part of its roof blown off and livestock pens and shelters were destroyed. A house suffered gutter damage and a nearby tractor had its windows blown out. Several irrigation pivots were overturned, trees were damaged, and a few head of cattle were injured and had to be euthanized.						
EFU	S of Dryden, TX	Terrell (TX), Acuña (COA)	TX, COA	29.96°N 102.14°W	23:45–00:34	21.2 mi (34.1 km)	200 yd (180 m)
EFU	A well-documented tornado remained on the ground for nearly an hour and crossed the international border into Mexico where it likely continued on. It moved through a remote area and any damage that may have occurred was inaccessible.						

=== June 3 event ===
List of confirmed tornadoes – Saturday, June 3, 2023
EF#	Location	County / Parish	State	Start Coord.	Time (UTC)	Path length	Max width
EF0	Western Salt Lake City	Salt Lake	UT	40.7567°N 111.9613°W	21:00	1.1 mi (1.8 km)	67 yd (61 m)
EF0	A tornado was captured on a webcam, causing very minor damage in an industrial area.						
EFU	SW of Deseret	Millard	UT	39.222°N 112.7765°W	23:43	Unknown	Unknown
EFU	Several videos captured a tornado briefly occurring. No damage was reported.						
EF0	Southeastern Amarillo	Potter	TX	35.1871°N 101.8138°W	00:50–00:51	0.24 mi (0.39 km)	10 yd (9.1 m)
EF0	A brief high-end EF0 tornado touched down in the southeastern part of Amarillo. It tossed an air conditioning unit off a dry cleaning business, blew out part of a sign at a coffee shop, knocked down the brick siding of a gas station, and inflicted minor damage to a drive-in restaurant. Cars had windows broken by flying debris and tree limbs were snapped as well.						

=== June 5 event ===
List of confirmed tornadoes – Monday, June 5, 2023
EF#	Location	County / Parish	State	Start Coord.	Time (UTC)	Path length	Max width
EFU	SE of Nara Visa	Quay	NM	35.5943°N 103.0849°W	23:25–23:30	0.22 mi (0.35 km)	30 yd (27 m)
EFU	A landspout tornado occurred briefly over open land. No damage occurred.						
EFU	SE of Wells	Elko	NV	41.03°N 114.84°W	23:25–00:25	0.5 mi (0.80 km)	500 yd (460 m)
EFU	The public captured photos of a tornado over mountainous terrain. No damage occurred.						
EFU	Northwestern Albuquerque	Bernalillo	NM	35.1624°N 106.7662°W	00:00–00:05	0.01 mi (0.016 km)	20 yd (18 m)
EFU	A brief landspout tornado was spotted on the mesa above Petroglyph National Monument. No damage occurred.						

=== June 6 event ===
List of confirmed tornadoes – Tuesday, June 5, 2023
EF#	Location	County / Parish	State	Start Coord.	Time (UTC)	Path length	Max width
EF0	W of South Shore	Codington	SD	45.009°N 97.049°W	20:58	0.01 mi (0.016 km)	10 yd (9.1 m)
EF0	A photo of a landspout tornado was shared on social media. No damage occurred.						
EF0	SE of Platteville	Weld	CO	40.18°N 104.73°W	23:38–23:39	0.01 mi (0.016 km)	20 yd (18 m)
EF0	A tornado touched down in an open field. No damage was observed.						

=== June 7 event ===
List of confirmed tornadoes – Wednesday, June 7, 2023
EF#	Location	County / Parish	State	Start Coord.	Time (UTC)	Path length	Max width
EF0	NE of Clark	Clark	SD	44.908°N 97.71°W	19:30	0.01 mi (0.016 km)	10 yd (9.1 m)
EF0	A landspout tornado that caused no damage was observed.						
EF1	South Patrick Shores	Brevard	FL	28.2055°N 80.6073°W	21:19–21:24	1 mi (1.6 km)	300 yd (270 m)
EF1	Numerous homes were damaged to south of Patrick Space Force Base, including 25 with minor damage and 10 that were heavily damaged. Damage included partial loss of roofs, carports, and awnings. Between six and ten power poles were snapped and a few trees were uprooted as well.						
EFU	N of Claire City, SD	Richland	ND	45.9378°N 97.0886°W	00:44	0.01 mi (0.016 km)	10 yd (9.1 m)
EFU	A weak and brief tornado occurred in an open field. No damage occurred.						

=== June 9 event ===
List of confirmed tornadoes – Friday, June 9, 2023
EF#	Location	County / Parish	State	Start Coord.	Time (UTC)	Path length	Max width
EF0	WNW of St. Teresa	Franklin	FL	29.94°N 84.51°W	19:14–19:15	0.34 mi (0.55 km)	50 yd (46 m)
EF0	A brief and weak tornado blew down several trees down along U.S. Route 319 on St. James Island.						
EFU	NE of Hinsdale	Valley	MT	48.41°N 107.05°W	23:20–23:21	0.04 mi (0.064 km)	10 yd (9.1 m)
EFU	Multiple trained spotters observed a brief tornado that caused no damage.						

=== June 10 event ===
List of confirmed tornadoes – Saturday, June 11, 2023
EF#	Location	County / Parish	State	Start Coord.	Time (UTC)	Path length	Max width
EFU	SW of Comfrey	Cottonwood	MN	44.0527°N 94.9576°W	19:47–19:48	0.13 mi (0.21 km)	10 yd (9.1 m)
EFU	A brief landspout tornado occurred in an open field, causing no damage.						
EFU	W of Box Elder to SSE of Gildford	Hill	MT	48.4065°N 110.1916°W	20:09–20:15	2.11 mi (3.40 km)	60 yd (55 m)
EFU	Broadcast media shared photos of a tornado. No damage was reported.						
EFU	W of Lake Wilson	Murray	MN	43.9909°N 95.998°W	22:43–22:44	0.09 mi (0.14 km)	10 yd (9.1 m)
EFU	A brief landspout tornado was photographed by numerous people. No damage was reported.						

=== June 11 event ===
List of confirmed tornadoes – Sunday, June 11, 2023
EF#	Location	County / Parish	State	Start Coord.	Time (UTC)	Path length	Max width
EF1	NNE of Grimsley to W of Rugby	Fentress	TN	36.32°N 84.96°W	21:30–21:49	11.32 mi (18.22 km)	300 yd (270 m)
EF1	Over a dozen outbuildings and barns were demolished and several hundred trees were snapped or uprooted along the path of this tornado, including some that landed on a vehicle. A church and multiple houses sustained roof and window damage as well and one house was shifted slightly off its foundation. A mobile home slid off its foundation as well, fencing was downed, and a few power poles were snapped.						
EF1	N of Crossville	Cumberland	TN	35.98°N 85.08°W	21:59–22:03	2.17 mi (3.49 km)	50 yd (46 m)
EF1	A house was blown completely off its foundation and suffered significant damage, though it was poorly built and wind likely entered the home's crawlspace through an opening, causing it to slide off its block foundation. Barns and outbuildings were damaged or destroyed and trees were uprooted. A hotel had metal roofing blown off, a ceramics plant suffered minor damage, and a fence was blown over.						
EF1	N of Robbins to SW of Helenwood	Scott	TN	36.3919°N 84.6028°W	22:04–22:11	3.4 mi (5.5 km)	200 yd (180 m)
EF1	Numerous trees were snapped or uprooted, some of which landed on mobile homes, one of which was destroyed. Other trees landed on power lines and vehicles and a barn suffered roof damage with debris scattered downwind.						
EF1	SE of Grimsley	Fentress	TN	36.25°N 84.96°W	22:58–23:02	2.33 mi (3.75 km)	30 yd (27 m)
EF1	Dozens of trees were snapped or uprooted, including some that landed on and caused damage to two homes and a few outbuildings.						
EF0	Southern Tipp City	Miami	OH	39.9326°N 84.176°W	23:23–23:24	0.6 mi (0.97 km)	150 yd (140 m)
EF0	Large tree branches were snapped at the south edge of Tipp City. A detached garage had part of its roof lifted and removed with some roofing material was tossed upward of 200 yards (180 m).						
EF0	Christiansburg	Champaign	OH	40.0534°N 84.0233°W	23:35–23:36	0.83 mi (1.34 km)	125 yd (114 m)
EF0	A weak tornado downed numerous tree branches in Christianburg.						
EF1	SW of Houston	Chickasaw	MS	33.8572°N 89.0784°W	02:34–02:36	0.86 mi (1.38 km)	100 yd (91 m)
EF1	A brief tornado caused significant damage to a manufactured home which was slid off its foundation blocks, sustained significant roof removal, and had both a wall and an attached patio partially collapsed. A nearby frame home sustained minor roof damage, had its front porch partially uplifted, and had its carport tossed. An outbuilding had part of its metal roof torn off and multiple trees were snapped or uprooted.						

=== June 12 event ===
List of confirmed tornadoes – Monday, June 12, 2023
EF#	Location	County / Parish	State	Start Coord.	Time (UTC)	Path length	Max width
EFU	N of Corinth	Jones	TX	32.87°N 99.86°W	05:35–05:39	0.43 mi (0.69 km)	50 yd (46 m)
EFU	Law enforcement reported a tornado. No damage occurred.						
EF0	WNW of Manchester	York	PA	40.0839°N 76.7746°W	17:30–17:32	0.33 mi (0.53 km)	130 yd (120 m)
EF0	A few trees were uprooted by this brief tornado.						
EFU	W of Holland	Dunklin	MO	Unknown	21:20–21:25	Unknown	Unknown
EFU	A landspout occurred.						

=== June 13 event ===
List of confirmed tornadoes – Tuesday, June 13, 2023
EF#	Location	County / Parish	State	Start Coord.	Time (UTC)	Path length	Max width
EFU	E of Felt	Cimarron	OK	36.5721°N 102.6201°W	21:06–21:09	0.91 mi (1.46 km)	35 yd (32 m)
EFU	A well-documented tornado occurred over open field. No damage occurred.						
EFU	ESE of Felt	Cimarron	OK	36.5312°N 102.5502°W	21:19–21:22	1.87 mi (3.01 km)	30 yd (27 m)
EFU	Storm chasers and trained storm spotters observed a tornado over an open field. It did not cause damage.						
EFU	WSW of Kerrick	Dallam	TX	36.4595°N 102.4438°W	21:50–21:53	1.35 mi (2.17 km)	35 yd (32 m)
EFU	Storm chasers and trained storm spotters observed a tornado over an open field. It did not cause damage.						
EFU	SE of Rock River	Albany	WY	41.68°N 105.82°W	00:44–00:50	2.36 mi (3.80 km)	100 yd (91 m)
EFU	A tornado that caused no damage was reported over open land.						

=== June 14 event ===
List of confirmed tornadoes – Wednesday, June 14, 2023
EF#	Location	County / Parish	State	Start Coord.	Time (UTC)	Path length	Max width
EF1	SW of Morris	Clay, Quitman	GA	31.7663°N 85.0031°W	15:37–15:44	3.63 mi (5.84 km)	50 yd (46 m)
EF1	Numerous trees were snapped or uprooted. The tornado continued through areas that were inaccessible to the damage survey team.						
EF1	Abbeville	Henry	AL	31.5692°N 85.2818°W	15:40–15:55	2.14 mi (3.44 km)	160 yd (150 m)
EF1	A tornado struck the northwest side of Abbeville where an office building and two homes had substantial roof damage, one of which had siding torn off and sustained damage to its porch. Numerous trees were either snapped or uprooted, concrete memorial monuments were knocked over, and multiple outbuildings were destroyed as well.						
EF1	Southern Eufaula	Barbour	AL	31.8562°N 85.1877°W	17:09–17:20	3.89 mi (6.26 km)	350 yd (320 m)
EF1	This high-end EF1 tornado impacted the south edge of Eufaula where the side of a metal building was ripped off, a church was damaged, and buildings at an apartment complex had roofing material torn off. A log cabin style home was unroofed, other homes sustained less severe roof damage, and numerous trees were snapped or uprooted, one of which landed on and damaged a home. The tornado dissipated over Walter F. George Lake.						
EF2	E of Wright Patman Lake to NNE of Bloomburg	Cass	TX	33.24°N 94.22°W	17:43–17:54	8.92 mi (14.36 km)	500 yd (460 m)
EF2	This strong tornado first touched down on the eastern banks of Wright Patman Lake. A home had part of its roof blown off and an industrial building was heavily damaged with its roof and multiple walls being destroyed. Hundreds of large trees were snapped or uprooted and multiple vehicles were flipped on US 59 before the tornado dissipated near the Arkansas state line.						
EF2	SSW of Blakely to NE of Nicholasville	Early, Baker	GA	31.357°N 84.9454°W	18:04–18:41	18.88 mi (30.38 km)	700 yd (640 m)
EF2	Two homes sustained major roof damage, several large metal-framed sheds were destroyed, a barn collapsed, and a double-wide manufactured home lost its roof and some exterior walls. A few other homes and mobile homes were damaged to a lesser degree. A chain-link fence was damaged, a wooden fence was blown down, and many large trees were snapped or uprooted along the path. The tornado dissipated immediately after crossing into Baker County.						
EF1	NNW of Newton	Baker	GA	31.397°N 84.422°W	18:54–19:15	3.6 mi (5.8 km)	150 yd (140 m)
EF1	A pivot irrigation system was flipped and numerous trees were downed.						
EF0	NNW of Ashburn	Turner	GA	31.74°N 83.68°W	19:45–19:46	0.09 mi (0.14 km)	50 yd (46 m)
EF0	A storm spotter reported a brief tornado touchdown in a rural area. No damage was reported.						
EF1	N of Pachitla (2nd tornado)	Randolph	GA	31.7892°N 84.7104°W	21:40–21:43	3.26 mi (5.25 km)	50 yd (46 m)
EF1	A grain silo was partially destroyed, several houses and manufactured homes were damaged, and trees were damaged as well.						
EF1	N of Pachitla (1st tornado)	Randolph	GA	31.7995°N 84.709°W	21:40–21:43	1.36 mi (2.19 km)	50 yd (46 m)
EF1	A brief tornado damaged a church, a manufactured home, and the roof of a house. Several stands of trees were also damaged.						
EF0	ENE of Nashville	Berrien	GA	31.24°N 83.14°W	22:35–22:36	0.1 mi (0.16 km)	50 yd (46 m)
EF0	A brief tornado was spotted. No damage was reported.						
EF0	NE of Brooklet	Bulloch	GA	32.4125°N 81.6346°W	23:08–23:09	0.19 mi (0.31 km)	250 yd (230 m)
EF0	Several trees were snapped or uprooted by this brief tornado.						
EF1	Northern Guyton to S of Springfield	Effingham	GA	32.3572°N 81.438°W	23:27–23:35	7.04 mi (11.33 km)	280 yd (260 m)
EF1	A tornado snapped or uprooted numerous trees and removed small amounts of roof fascia and shingles from a few homes.						

=== June 15 event ===
List of confirmed tornadoes – Thursday, June 15, 2023
EF#	Location	County / Parish	State	Start Coord.	Time (UTC)	Path length	Max width
EF0	NE of Faxon	Comanche	OK	34.485°N 98.54°W	21:58–22:08	3.8 mi (6.1 km)	50 yd (46 m)
EF0	Trees and shingles were damaged by this weak tornado.						
EF2	S of Farnsworth to SSE of Perryton	Ochiltree	TX	36.1526°N 100.9489°W	22:02–22:35	17.35 mi (27.92 km)	200 yd (180 m)
EF2	An unusually strong and long-lived landspout tornado remained over mostly open grassland. It snapped power poles along SH 70, which was the basis for the low-end EF2 rating. Some prairie scrub brush was ripped out of the ground as well. The 2212 UTC EF0 tornado occurred simultaneously with this tornado.						
EF2	Northern Toledo to E of Harbor View	Lucas	OH	41.7296°N 83.5426°W	22:06–22:11	3.81 mi (6.13 km)	300 yd (270 m)
EF2	A strong tornado touched down in the northern part of Toledo, causing extensive damage in the Point Place neighborhood. The second floor of a medical laboratory building was mostly destroyed, an automotive business suffered major damage, and a storage barn collapsed. Windows were blown out of a strip mall and a gas station convenience store as well. Numerous power poles and large trees were snapped, some of which fell onto homes, power lines, and vehicles. The tornado lifted over the Maumee River.						
EF3	Perryton	Ochiltree	TX	36.4135°N 100.8302°W	22:06–22:17	6.31 mi (10.15 km)	880 yd (800 m)
EF3	3 deaths – see article on this tornado – 100 people were injured.						
EF1	Detroit Beach to SW of Estral Beach	Monroe	MI	41.9351°N 83.3316°W	22:09–22:18	4.77 mi (7.68 km)	400 yd (370 m)
EF1	This tornado touched down in Detroit Beach and moved northeast through Woodland Beach. Numerous trees and tree limbs were downed in both communities, some of which landed on cars and homes. Minor tree limb damage occurred near the Enrico Fermi Nuclear Generating Station before the tornado moved offshore and dissipated over Lake Erie.						
EF0	S of Geronimo	Cotton	OK	34.42°N 98.402°W	22:10–22:12	1.2 mi (1.9 km)	50 yd (46 m)
EF0	A weak tornado caused minor damage to barns and shingles.						
EFU	WNW of Duncan	Stephens	OK	34.536°N 98.127°W	22:11–22:13	0.5 mi (0.80 km)	50 yd (46 m)
EFU	Weather spotters reported a tornado that caused no damage.						
EF0	SSE of Farnsworth to SSE of Perryton	Ochiltree	TX	36.1412°N 100.9046°W	22:12–22:30	12.26 mi (19.73 km)	50 yd (46 m)
EF0	This landspout tornado, which occurred simultaneously with the 2202 UTC EF2 landspout tornado, remained over mostly open grassland as it tracked about a 1/2 mile (0.80 km) south of the stronger tornado. No damage was reported.						
EF0	E of Harbor View	Lucas	OH	41.6864°N 83.359°W	22:28–22:29	0.24 mi (0.39 km)	50 yd (46 m)
EF0	A waterspout developed over Maumee Bay and moved onshore as a tornado at Maumee Bay State Park, toppling several dead trees, snapping tree branches, and damaging a boardwalk.						
EF0	E of Empire City	Stephens	OK	34.416°N 97.958°W	22:34–22:36	0.8 mi (1.3 km)	200 yd (180 m)
EF0	A storm chaser observed a tornado. No damage was reported.						
EF1	Southwestern Comanche	Stephens	OK	34.364°N 97.99°W	22:37–22:38	0.5 mi (0.80 km)	20 yd (18 m)
EF1	A brief tornado formed and moved into the southwest side of Comanche. Trees were downed and outbuilding was damaged just outside of town, while an apartment building was damaged in town.						
EF2	S of Oak Harbor to SW of Lacarne	Ottawa	OH	41.4688°N 83.1457°W	22:49–22:58	3.44 mi (5.54 km)	200 yd (180 m)
EF2	A strong tornado damaged five homes, a couple of which were totally unroofed, including one that had its attached garage and second floor exterior walls ripped off. Barns and outbuildings were completely destroyed, debris was scattered across fields, and trees were twisted and snapped. A vehicle was damaged by flying debris, and as many as ten cattle were killed.						
EF1	NE of Lindsey	Sandusky	OH	41.4494°N 83.1558°W	22:57–22:58	0.15 mi (0.24 km)	100 yd (91 m)
EF1	A very brief tornado toppled seven trees, two of which landed on a home. One more tree was snapped at its base.						
EFU	NE of Sugden	Jefferson	OK	34.1107°N 97.9429°W	22:58–23:00	0.8 mi (1.3 km)	50 yd (46 m)
EFU	Storm chasers observed a tornado. No damage was reported.						
EF1	WNW of Loco	Stephens	OK	34.353°N 97.774°W	23:03–23:05	1.5 mi (2.4 km)	50 yd (46 m)
EF1	A tornado uprooted and snapped trees along its path.						
EF2	SE of Loco to NW of Healdton	Stephens, Jefferson	OK	34.299°N 97.653°W	23:16–23:29	4.1 mi (6.6 km)	1,000 yd (910 m)
EF2	A small, unanchored block foundation home and a mobile home were swept away and completely destroyed by this large and slow-moving tornado, and debris was scattered across a nearby field. A well-built home sustained considerable roof damage, a nearby detached garage had much of its roofing torn off, and several other homes had less severe roof and window damage. Multiple outbuildings were damaged or destroyed, many trees were snapped or uprooted, and power poles were snapped as well.						
EF0	NE of Vickery	Sandusky	OH	41.3867°N 82.922°W	23:19–23:20	0.33 mi (0.53 km)	50 yd (46 m)
EF0	A brief tornado partially removed the metal roof of an outbuilding, and metal roofing was thrown into a field. Shingles were torn off the roof of a home and a power pole was snapped.						
EF1	S of Higgins, TX	Lipscomb (TX), Ellis (OK)	TX, OK	36.076°N 100.018°W	23:29–23:36	4.76 mi (7.66 km)	200 yd (180 m)
EF1	Storm chasers documented a cone tornado that moved over open county grasslands before crossing into Oklahoma, where it caused damage to trees.						
EF0	Northern Bellevue	Sandusky	OH	41.2845°N 82.8514°W	23:40–23:42	0.93 mi (1.50 km)	50 yd (46 m)
EF0	A weak tornado downed several power poles, uprooted trees, and snapped large tree branches as it moved through the north side of Bellevue.						
EF0	St. George Island	Franklin	FL	29.6226°N 84.9496°W	23:43–23:48	0.44 mi (0.71 km)	50 yd (46 m)
EF0	A waterspout made landfall on the western end of Saint George Island, causing minor damage to a home.						
EFU	SW of Durham	Roger Mills	OK	35.796°N 99.978°W	23:47–23:50	1 mi (1.6 km)	50 yd (46 m)
EFU	A storm chaser reported a tornado. No known damage occurred.						
EF2	SSW of Monroeville to W of North Fairfield	Huron	OH	41.2172°N 82.7036°W	23:48–00:04	8.7 mi (14.0 km)	2,200 yd (2,000 m)
EF2	This large EF2 tornado heavily damaged several houses and was over a mile wide at times. One house was shifted off its foundation and had a garage wall blown out, while a car at another home was lifted and moved. Barns, outbuildings, and silos were heavily damaged or completely destroyed, and debris was scattered up to 0.25 miles (0.40 km) away. A piece of slate roofing was also torn off of a building and impaled into a tree, projectiles were left embedded in the ground, and a metal flag pole was completely bent over. Many trees were snapped, uprooted, or stripped of their limbs, and power poles were also snapped along the path.						
EF0	S of Monroeville	Huron	OH	41.1924°N 82.7052°W	23:51–23:54	1.64 mi (2.64 km)	100 yd (91 m)
EF0	A tree was uprooted and several large branches were snapped.						
EF0	W of North Fairfield	Huron	OH	41.1163°N 82.6608°W	00:01–00:02	0.66 mi (1.06 km)	100 yd (91 m)
EF0	Some tree damage occurred as a result of this brief, weak tornado.						
EF1	Eastern North Fairfield to W of Greenwich	Huron	OH	41.1406°N 82.6025°W	00:04–00:22	8.63 mi (13.89 km)	1,100 yd (1,000 m)
EF1	A large high-end EF1 tornado formed north of North Fairfield and moved south into town, where homes had roofing material torn off or were damaged by falling trees, a large sign was ripped off a building, and power and light poles were damaged. The most intense damage occurred outside of town, where a mobile home and the second floor of a two-story house were heavily damaged, and many trees and several power poles were snapped. Multiple silos were heavily damaged, outbuildings had their roofs removed, and an old barn collapsed.						
EF1	N of Greenwich	Huron	OH	41.0656°N 82.563°W	00:13–00:22	4.03 mi (6.49 km)	250 yd (230 m)
EF1	This tornado struck a grain facility at the beginning of its path, damaging or knocking over large metal silos and storage tanks. A small office building, an outbuilding, and some equipment was also damaged at this location. Damage along the remainder of the path was limited to downed trees and tree limbs.						
EF0	NE of Marietta	Love	OK	33.95°N 97.115°W	00:26–00:27	0.5 mi (0.80 km)	10 yd (9.1 m)
EF0	A research meteorologist observed a tornado that caused minor tree damage.						
EF0	NE of Nankin	Ashland	OH	40.9343°N 82.2738°W	00:47–00:49	1.24 mi (2.00 km)	300 yd (270 m)
EF0	The roof of a house was damaged, a barn lost part of its roof, and a chicken coop was damaged as well. An outbuilding had its walls and garage door pushed out, with insulation thrown into a field. In addition, several trees were downed, with their branches snapped.						
EF1	SE of Henrietta	Clay	TX	33.756°N 98.167°W	01:02–01:08	2.5 mi (4.0 km)	100 yd (91 m)
EF1	A large tree was downed, an outbuilding was destroyed, and one house suffered roof damage.						
EF2	West Pensacola to Pensacola Beach	Escambia, Santa Rosa	FL	30.4132°N 87.2725°W	01:35–02:08	8.58 mi (13.81 km)	450 yd (410 m)
EF2	This tornado was embedded in a larger area of straight-line wind damage, and first snapped trees and downed tree limbs as it moved southeastward along an intermittent path through West Pensacola and Warrington. Additional tree damage occurred at the Pensacola Country Club before it crossed Pensacola Bay, passing just west of Gulf Breeze. The tornado strengthened and then moved onshore at Pensacola Beach, inflicting significant damage to homes that were built to withstand major hurricanes. This included several homes that had siding and a substantial amount of roofing torn off, and several others that had garage doors blown in and destroyed, leading to the failure of exterior walls. One home that was under construction had its entire top floor and roof removed, and a large dumpster weighing several hundred pounds was tossed up to 70 yards (64 m). At least two boats were tossed, one of which was found 30 yards (27 m) from its boat lift, while the second was thrown an unknown distance into the water and then floated to Deer Point, which is located about 1 mile (1.6 km) away. The tornado then moved offshore into the Gulf of Mexico before dissipating.						

=== June 16 event ===
List of confirmed tornadoes – Friday, June 16, 2023
EF#	Location	County / Parish	State	Start Coord.	Time (UTC)	Path length	Max width
EF0	W of Loxley	Baldwin	AL	30.6182°N 87.7945°W	05:21–05:22	0.5 mi (0.80 km)	75 yd (69 m)
EF0	Intermittent tree damage occurred, including two trees that were uprooted. This tornado's path was slightly extended in July 2025.						
EF0	SE of Fanlew	Taylor	FL	30.175°N 83.897°W	05:43–05:45	0.97 mi (1.56 km)	50 yd (46 m)
EF0	A brief tornado touched down, causing tree damage.						
EF1	S of Panola, TX to NW of Keatchie, LA	Panola (TX), Caddo (LA)	TX, LA	32.2559°N 94.0744°W	06:15–06:25	7.73 mi (12.44 km)	844 yd (772 m)
EF1	This tornado caused widespread tree damage, including one tree that fell on a home.						
EF0	W of Hampton Springs	Taylor	FL	30.08°N 83.88°W	06:20–06:44	7.23 mi (11.64 km)	100 yd (91 m)
EF0	A well-defined TDS appeared on radar. Only tree damage occurred.						
EF0	ESE of St. Marks to SE of Fanlew	Jefferson, Taylor	FL	30.126°N 84.044°W	07:09–07:23	6.37 mi (10.25 km)	100 yd (91 m)
EF0	Trees were damaged.						
EF0	SE of Fanlew to SW of Iddo	Taylor	FL	30.16°N 83.88°W	07:30–07:41	3.42 mi (5.50 km)	75 yd (69 m)
EF0	A weak tornado damaged numerous trees.						
EF1	S of Perry	Taylor	FL	30.0829°N 83.594°W	07:45–07:50	1.26 mi (2.03 km)	80 yd (73 m)
EF1	A large metal building lost roof panels, a metal porch roof was torn off a house, and an outbuilding had its roof peeled back. An airplane was pushed sideways and moved at Perry–Foley Airport and a sign was also damaged. Trees were snapped and uprooted as well.						
EF1	Southern Vicksburg to W of Learned	Warren	MS	32.2456°N 90.9258°W	09:40–09:47	8.54 mi (13.74 km)	900 yd (820 m)
EF1	A high-end EF1 tornado snapped or uprooted numerous trees as it moved through wooded areas in southern Vicksburg. One large tree fell on a home.						
EF1	SE of Utica	Hinds	MS	32.0928°N 90.6178°W	09:54–10:02	6.54 mi (10.53 km)	800 yd (730 m)
EF1	Numerous trees were snapped or uprooted, and several utility poles and power lines were downed. The tornado may have been anticyclonic based on radar.						
EF1	E of Bucks to S of Stockton	Mobile, Baldwin	AL	31.02°N 87.98°W	12:59–13:08	8.48 mi (13.65 km)	200 yd (180 m)
EF1	A rare anticyclonic tornado snapped and uprooted multiple trees in the Mobile River valley. This tornado's path length was extended and its width was increased in July 2025.						
EF1	E of Compass to WNW of Wagontown	Chester	PA	40.0273°N 75.9052°W	15:10–15:14	1.8 mi (2.9 km)	250 yd (230 m)
EF1	Trees were snapped or uprooted and power lines were downed. Falling trees caused damage to a fence and caused a utility pole to snap.						
EF0	E of Buddtown to SE of New Lisbon	Burlington	NJ	39.9291°N 74.6873°W	16:55–17:01	3.4 mi (5.5 km)	200 yd (180 m)
EF0	A weak tornado snapped or uprooted multiple trees as it moved through a sparsely populated area. One tree fell on a power line.						
EFU	Clearwater Beach	Pinellas	FL	27.98°N 82.83°W	20:10	Unknown	Unknown
EFU	A waterspout moved ashore and injured two people.						
EF0	Smithfield to S of Bartlett	Isle of Wight, City of Suffolk	VA	36.988°N 76.648°W	20:36–20:58	8.46 mi (13.62 km)	100 yd (91 m)
EF0	This tornado touched down at the outskirts of Smithfield and moved directly through town, where large tree branches were downed and several homes had roof damage. The tornado continued southeastward through areas outside of town before it dissipated.						
EF0	S of Arriba	Lincoln	CO	39.2°N 103.27°W	22:29–22:30	0.01 yd (0.0091 m)	20 yd (18 m)
EF0	A brief tornado touched down over open country, causing no damage.						

=== June 17 event ===
List of confirmed tornadoes – Saturday, June 17, 2023
EF#	Location	County / Parish	State	Start Coord.	Time (UTC)	Path length	Max width
EF0	Irvington	Mobile	AL	30.4897°N 88.2385°W	05:21–05:28	3.91 mi (6.29 km)	80 yd (73 m)
EF0	The underskirt of two manufactured homes were damaged, and multiple trees and tree branches were snapped. The corner of a farm outbuilding was torn off and metal debris from the structure was thrown across a road.						
EF0	WNW of Thatcher	Las Animas	CO	37.72°N 104.45°W	21:50–21:53	2.04 mi (3.28 km)	10 yd (9.1 m)
EF0	A weak tornado was photographed and posted on social media. No damage occurred.						
EF0	NE of Elsanor	Baldwin	AL	30.6037°N 87.555°W	21:30–21:47	3.56 mi (5.73 km)	20 yd (18 m)
EF0	Some tree limbs were snapped by this weak tornado.						
EFU	SE of Turpin	Beaver	OK	36.7911°N 100.7865°W	23:08–23:12	2.22 mi (3.57 km)	50 yd (46 m)
EFU	A few storm spotters observed a tornado moving through open fields. No damage was found.						
EFU	NE of Rotan to NW of Hamlin	Stonewall	TX	32.9857°N 100.3701°W	23:18–23:49	4.29 mi (6.90 km)	50 yd (46 m)
EFU	Numerous storm chasers reported a tornado over open ranch land. No damage occurred.						
EFU	NW of Hamlin	Fisher	TX	32.92°N 100.21°W	23:45–23:55	1.04 mi (1.67 km)	50 yd (46 m)
EFU	A tornado was reported by local law enforcement.						
EF1	SW of Rosston to N of Laverne	Beaver, Harper	OK	36.7631°N 100.0189°W	00:42–00:50	8.48 mi (13.65 km)	300 yd (270 m)
EF1	This tornado damaged the roof of a home, a barn, power poles and trees.						
EFU	N of Burlington	Alfalfa	OK	36.914°N 98.422°W	02:24–02:25	1.5 mi (2.4 km)	30 yd (27 m)
EFU	A tornado remained primarily over cropland, possibly doing tree damage.						

=== June 18 event ===
List of confirmed tornadoes – Sunday, June 18, 2023
EF#	Location	County / Parish	State	Start Coord.	Time (UTC)	Path length	Max width
EF1	ENE of Collinsville to WSW of Foyil	Rogers	OK	36.392°N 95.763°W	05:40–05:52	10.9 mi (17.5 km)	1,000 yd (910 m)
EF1	A large tornado snapped and uprooted numerous trees, damaged multiple homes and outbuildings, and toppled numerous power poles.						
EF1	SW of Chelsea	Rogers	OK	36.518°N 95.565°W	05:56–06:03	5.2 mi (8.4 km)	800 yd (730 m)
EF1	Numerous trees were snapped or uprooted, and numerous power poles were toppled.						
EF1	S of Strang	Mayes	OK	36.391°N 95.170°W	06:09–06:15	4.1 mi (6.6 km)	300 yd (270 m)
EF1	Numerous trees were snapped or uprooted.						
EF2	Prairie View to S of Tokalon	Logan	AR	35.3259°N 93.552°W	06:12–06:17	5.4 mi (8.7 km)	700 yd (640 m)
EF2	A strong tornado impacted areas in and around the rural community of Prairie View, where five chicken houses were completely destroyed and multiple others sustained damage. One outbuilding was flattened and another had its roofing material removed. Roofing was ripped off a house, a two-car garage was blown off its foundation, and many trees were snapped or uprooted.						
EF0	S of Menifee	Perry	AR	35.0855°N 92.5485°W	07:12–07:13	0.2 mi (0.32 km)	60 yd (55 m)
EF0	The roofs of small outbuildings and homes were damaged. A chicken coop was blown apart, part of which was tossed into the window of a nearby manufactured home. A carport was blown sideways, and trees were damaged.						
EF0	Pine Island Center	Lee	FL	26.6086°N 82.1149°W	15:10–15:11	0.01 mi (0.016 km)	10 yd (9.1 m)
EF0	A brief tornado that was only on the ground for a few seconds damaged a recently constructed metal outdoor freezer.						
EF1	ENE of Quitman	Clarke	MS	32.0609°N 88.6577°W	15:54–15:57	2.01 mi (3.23 km)	150 yd (140 m)
EF1	A brief tornado snapped numerous tree branches and downed a few trees. A few trees were downed onto a home and a vehicle, and an outbuilding had a portion of its roof peeled back.						
EF0	ENE of Harrisburg	Linn	OR	44.3005°N 123.0673°W	20:30–20:32	0.3 mi (0.48 km)	150 yd (140 m)
EF0	A brief, weak tornado moved across I-5 before dissipating. No damage was reported.						
EF1	SW of Pocahontas	Randolph	AR	36.2184°N 91.0453°W	21:57–22:08	5 mi (8.0 km)	300 yd (270 m)
EF1	Multiple trees were snapped or uprooted and a large tree branch fell onto the roof of a house.						
EF0	N of Sharon	Madison	MS	32.7065°N 89.9481°W	00:38–00:40	1.65 mi (2.66 km)	250 yd (230 m)
EF0	A weak tornado snapped or uprooted multiple trees, damaged the metal roof of a home, and displaced a roof antenna.						
EF1	Ridgeland	Madison	MS	32.4296°N 90.1404°W	00:57–00:59	1.38 mi (2.22 km)	300 yd (270 m)
EF1	This tornado touched down in Ridgeland, where an old historic church collapsed after it was pushed off its foundation blocks, while a newer and more well-built church had shingle damage. A few homes also sustained shingle damage and tin was torn from a couple of businesses, some of which was thrown into power lines. A power pole was also downed and a fence was blown over.						
EF1	N of Morton	Scott	MS	32.4526°N 89.6347°W	01:04–01:18	6.48 mi (10.43 km)	350 yd (320 m)
EF1	Trees were snapped as this tornado moved through wooded areas.						
EF2	SE of Calion to NNE of Strong	Union	AR	33.2599°N 92.4481°W	01:15–01:42	10.31 mi (16.59 km)	1,320 yd (1,210 m)
EF2	A low-end EF2 tornado impacted a chicken farm, destroying three of the five chicken coops. Nearby barns and outbuildings were damaged as well, and numerous trees were snapped or uprooted. One tree fell on and damaged a manufactured home.						
EF1	Eastern Langford	Rankin	MS	32.3554°N 89.9352°W	01:29–01:37	2.05 mi (3.30 km)	300 yd (270 m)
EF1	Multiple trees were uprooted, a utility line was downed, and a home sustained shingle damage.						
EF0	N of Pelahatchie	Rankin	MS	32.3565°N 89.811°W	01:58–01:59	1.01 mi (1.63 km)	50 yd (46 m)
EF0	Minor tree damage occurred.						
EF2	SE of Florence	Rankin	MS	32.1226°N 90.1315°W	02:05–02:25	6.08 mi (9.78 km)	400 yd (370 m)
EF2	Several homes sustained minor to moderate roof damage, one of which also had its porch damaged. An outbuilding collapsed and many trees were downed, including numerous hardwood tree trunks that were snapped at low-end EF2 intensity in a wooded area. A fence around a basketball court was toppled as well.						
EF0	SSE of Florence	Rankin	MS	32.118°N 90.0166°W	02:21–02:23	0.92 mi (1.48 km)	100 yd (91 m)
EF0	A few trees were uprooted and tree limbs were broken.						
EF1	SSE of Pelahatchie to S of Morton	Rankin, Scott	MS	32.2446°N 89.7625°W	02:25–02:40	5.48 mi (8.82 km)	450 yd (410 m)
EF1	This tornado downed numerous trees and tree branches as it impacted wooded areas near the rural communities of Cross Roads and Cooperville.						
EF0	NW of Raleigh (1st tornado)	Smith	MS	32.0835°N 89.6099°W	03:23–03:24	0.5 mi (0.80 km)	100 yd (91 m)
EF0	Several trees were damaged or downed by this brief, weak tornado.						
EF0	NW of Raleigh (2nd tornado)	Smith	MS	32.0465°N 89.563°W	03:27–03:32	2.64 mi (4.25 km)	100 yd (91 m)
EF0	A few trees were downed and tree branches were broken.						
EF1	N of Sylvarena	Smith	MS	32.0911°N 89.4079°W	03:52–04:01	2.5 mi (4.0 km)	400 yd (370 m)
EF1	Numerous trees and a few home sustained minor damage. Multiple power lines were downed as well.						
EF1	NNW of Sylvarena	Smith	MS	32.0856°N 89.4027°W	03:59–04:12	4.53 mi (7.29 km)	800 yd (730 m)
EF1	Trees and tree limbs were downed.						
EF3	N of Bay Springs to ENE of Louin	Jasper	MS	32.0179°N 89.2884°W	04:29–04:48	6.46 mi (10.40 km)	1,350 yd (1,230 m)
EF3	1 death – See section on this tornado – 25 people were injured.						

=== June 19 event ===
List of confirmed tornadoes – Monday, June 19, 2023
EF#	Location	County / Parish	State	Start Coord.	Time (UTC)	Path length	Max width
EF1	Columbia	Marion	MS	31.2508°N 89.8261°W	13:49–13:53	1.96 mi (3.15 km)	200 yd (180 m)
EF1	A tornado touched down in Columbia and snapped or uprooted trees. One tree caused roof damage to a home upon falling, and many tree branches were downed as well.						
EF1	Miramar Beach	Walton	FL	30.3868°N 86.3288°W	16:16–16:21	1.62 mi (2.61 km)	200 yd (180 m)
EF1	This tornado touched down at a condominium complex in Miramar Beach, where a condo building had a storm shutter torn off and fencing was blown over at a tennis court. Several houses and a business sustained roof damage elsewhere in town, many trees and tree branches were downed, and fences were damaged or destroyed.						
EF1	WNW of Bon Secour	Baldwin	AL	30.341°N 87.791°W	18:00–18:09	1.64 mi (2.64 km)	230 yd (210 m)
EF1	A farm building with reinforced hurricane straps had its entire roof ripped off and wrapped around trees. A home's attached garage had about half of its roof removed, and multiple trees were snapped or uprooted. A small outbuilding was destroyed and another outbuilding was damaged.						
EF2	Moss Point	Jackson	MS	30.42°N 88.57°W	19:48–19:57	2.35 mi (3.78 km)	300 yd (270 m)
EF2	A high-end EF2 tornado caused significant damage as it moved through Moss Point, where numerous homes were damaged and some had roofs and exterior walls torn off. The Merchants & Marine Bank and the First Missionary Baptist Church were both severely damaged and had their roofs torn off, and some apartment buildings also sustained severe damage, one of which had its roof and some second floor exterior walls removed. Moss Point High School, Moss Point Vocational Center, and multiple businesses had considerable roof and exterior damage, detached garages were completely destroyed, and RVs were overturned. Many trees were snapped or uprooted in town, signs were destroyed, and power poles were snapped as well. Six people were injured.						

=== June 20 event ===
List of confirmed tornadoes – Tuesday, June 20, 2023
EF#	Location	County / Parish	State	Start Coord.	Time (UTC)	Path length	Max width
EF2	ESE of Bayou Gauche	St. Charles	LA	29.76°N 90.28°W	21:00–21:07	2.27 mi (3.65 km)	440 yd (400 m)
EF2	A strong tornado was discovered via high-resolution satellite imagery. Widespread trees were uprooted and snapped. Ground scouring was noted as well. The tornado likely continued onto Salvador Lake before dissipating.						
EF1	NNE of Carpenter, ND to W of Lena, MB	Rolette (ND), Boissevain-Morton (MB)	ND, MB	48.9983°N 99.9603°W	02:35	≥4.0 mi (6.5 km)	≥230 yd (210 m)
EF1	Aerial surveys revealed a tornado touched down just south of the Canada–United States border and moved northeast into Canada. Damage was confined to trees. Only the Canadian portion of the track was surveyed.						

=== June 21 event ===
List of confirmed tornadoes – Wednesday, June 21, 2023
EF#	Location	County / Parish	State	Start Coord.	Time (UTC)	Path length	Max width
EFU	ENE of Lorenzo	Cheyenne	NE	41.0583°N 103.0234°W	19:33	0.59 mi (0.95 km)	50 yd (46 m)
EFU	A local emergency manager observed a brief tornado. No damage occurred.						
EFU	SSW of Padroni	Logan	CO	40.7109°N 103.1988°W	19:44–19:47	0.46 mi (0.74 km)	—N/a
EFU	A storm chaser observed a tornado that caused no damage.						
EFU	SE of Akron	Washington	CO	40.0657°N 102.9894°W	21:05–21:10	0.67 mi (1.08 km)	—N/a
EFU	A storm chaser observed a tornado over open fields. No damage occurred.						
EFU	NNE of Pawnee Pass	Logan	CO	—N/a	21:35–21:46	1.5 mi (2.4 km)	—N/a
EFU	Trained storm spotters observed a tornado over open country. No damage occurred.						
EFU	S of Akron (1st tornado)	Washington	CO	39.9991°N 103.1896°W	22:10–22:11	0.3 mi (0.48 km)	25 yd (23 m)
EFU	A storm chaser observed a brief rope tornado that moved over open fields and caused no damage.						
EFU	S of Claude	Armstrong	TX	34.95°N 101.38°W	22:18-22:23	0.97 mi (1.56 km)	100 yd (91 m)
EFU	A tornado occurred over an open field, causing no damage.						
EFU	S of Akron (2nd tornado)	Washington	CO	40.0207°N 103.2032°W	22:18–22:22	0.51 mi (0.82 km)	200 yd (180 m)
EFU	Storm chasers observed a cone tornado. No damage occurred.						
EFU	S of Akron (3rd tornado)	Washington	CO	—N/a	22:25–22:26	1 mi (1.6 km)	50 yd (46 m)
EFU	Storm chasers observed a tornado that remained over open country and caused no damage.						
EFU	S of Akron (4th tornado)	Washington	CO	40.0200°N 103.1971°W	22:28–22:29	0.25 mi (0.40 km)	50 yd (46 m)
EFU	A brief tornado touched down in an open field and caused no damage.						
EF2	S of Akron (5th tornado)	Washington	CO	40.0225°N 103.2085°W	22:28–22:35	1.5 mi (2.4 km)	400 yd (370 m)
EF2	Storm chasers observed a large tornado that snapped multiple wooden power poles along SH 63.						
EFU	S of Akron (6th tornado)	Washington	CO	—N/a	22:29–22:30	0.5 mi (0.80 km)	50 yd (46 m)
EFU	A storm chaser reported a brief satellite tornado in association with the 4th tornado south of Akron. No damage occurred.						
EFU	S of Akron (7th tornado)	Washington	CO	—N/a	22:31–22:34	4 mi (6.4 km)	50 yd (46 m)
EFU	A storm chaser reported a second, stronger satellite tornado in association with the 4th tornado south of Akron. No damage occurred.						
EFU	S of Akron (8th tornado)	Washington	CO	—N/a	22:36–22:37	0.5 mi (0.80 km)	—N/a
EFU	A storm chaser observed another brief tornado that caused no damage.						
EFU	S of Akron (9th tornado)	Washington	CO	40.0323°N 103.2387°W	22:37–22:38	0.5 mi (0.80 km)	—N/a
EFU	A storm chaser observed a tornado. No damage occurred.						
EFU	S of Akron (10th tornado)	Washington	CO	40.0329°N 103.2183°W	22:39–22:40	0.25 mi (0.40 km)	—N/a
EFU	A storm chaser observed a brief tornado that remained over open fields and caused no damage.						
EFU	S of Akron (11th tornado)	Washington	CO	40.0363°N 103.2269°W	22:40–22:41	0.57 mi (0.92 km)	—N/a
EFU	A storm chaser observed a brief tornado that moved across open fields and caused no damage.						
EFU	S of Akron (12th tornado)	Washington	CO	—N/a	22:42–22:43	0.25 mi (0.40 km)	—N/a
EFU	A storm chaser observed a brief tornado that caused no damage.						
EF1	S of Akron (13th tornado)	Washington	CO	40.0422°N 103.2456°W	22:43–22:45	0.95 mi (1.53 km)	200 yd (180 m)
EF1	This tornado caused some damage at a farmstead, but otherwise remained over open fields.						
EFU	S of Akron (14th tornado)	Washington	CO	40.0397°N 103.2202°W	22:43–22:45	0.5 mi (0.80 km)	—N/a
EFU	A storm chaser observed a large tornado that remained over open country. No damage occurred.						
EFU	S of Akron (15th tornado)	Washington	CO	40.0470°N 103.2400°W	22:45–22:46	0.5 mi (0.80 km)	—N/a
EFU	A brief tornado touched down and moved across open fields. No damage occurred.						
EFU	S of Akron (16th tornado)	Washington	CO	40.0470°N 103.2249°W	22:45–22:46	0.25 mi (0.40 km)	50 yd (46 m)
EFU	A brief tornado touched down in an open field and caused no damage. This tornado occurred simultaneously with the previous one.						
EFU	S of Akron (17th tornado)	Washington	CO	40.0484°N 103.2352°W	22:46–22:47	0.5 mi (0.80 km)	—N/a
EFU	A storm chaser observed a brief tornado that moved over open fields. No damage occurred.						
EFU	S of Akron (18th tornado)	Washington	CO	—N/a	22:47–22:48	0.5 mi (0.80 km)	—N/a
EFU	A storm chaser observed another tornado. It remained over open country and caused no damage.						
EFU	S of Akron (19th tornado)	Washington	CO	40.0531°N 103.2361°W	22:48–22:49	0.54 mi (0.87 km)	100 yd (91 m)
EFU	A storm chaser observed a brief tornado that remained over open fields. No damage occurred.						
EFU	S of Akron (20th tornado)	Washington	CO	—N/a	22:49–22:50	0.5 mi (0.80 km)	—N/a
EFU	A storm chaser observed a large tornado that remained over open country. No damage occurred.						
EFU	S of Akron (21st tornado)	Washington	CO	40.0580°N 103.2490°W	22:50–22:51	0.5 mi (0.80 km)	—N/a
EFU	A storm chaser observed a brief tornado that remained over open fields and caused no damage.						
EFU	S of Akron (22nd tornado)	Washington	CO	—N/a	22:51–22:52	0.5 mi (0.80 km)	—N/a
EFU	A storm chaser observed another tornado in an open field. No damage occurred.						
EFU	S of Akron (23rd tornado)	Washington	CO	—N/a	22:52–22:55	2 mi (3.2 km)	200 yd (180 m)
EFU	A storm chaser observed yet another tornado that moved across open fields. No damage occurred.						
EFU	S of Akron (24th tornado)	Washington	CO	—N/a	22:53–22:56	0.5 mi (0.80 km)	—N/a
EFU	A storm chaser observed another tornado that occurred simultaneously with the previous one. No damage occurred.						
EFU	S of Akron (25th tornado)	Washington	CO	40.0632°N 103.2495°W	22:57–23:10	—N/a	400 yd (370 m)
EFU	A storm chaser observed a large multi-vortex tornado that remained over open fields. No damage occurred.						
EFU	S of Akron (26th tornado)	Washington	CO	40.0756°N 103.2455°W	23:15–23:19	1 mi (1.6 km)	50 yd (46 m)
EFU	A storm chaser observed a brief cone tornado that remained over open fields, causing no damage.						
EF2	S of Akron (27th tornado)	Washington	CO	40.0952°N 103.3080°W	23:20–23:36	3 mi (4.8 km)	400 yd (370 m)
EF2	A strong tornado destroyed multiple grain bins and a barn. Wooden power poles were snapped as well.						
EF1	NE of Willard	Logan	CO	40.5737°N 103.4509°W	23:30–23:40	0.25 mi (0.40 km)	15 yd (14 m)
EF1	A brief high-end EF1 tornado tore most of the roof off of a farmhouse and caused its chimney to collapse. Tree damage occurred, and an old barn was destroyed as well.						
EFU	W of Woodward	Washington	CO	39.9866°N 103.4327°W	23:39–23:53	—N/a	—N/a
EFU	A storm chaser observed a tornado that remained over open country. No damage occurred.						
EFU	N of Anton (1st tornado)	Washington	CO	39.83°N 103.21°W	00:14–00:15	0.71 mi (1.14 km)	50 yd (46 m)
EFU	Storm chasers observed a brief anticyclonic tornado that caused no damage.						
EF2	NW of Anton	Washington	CO	39.8654°N 103.2302°W	00:16–00:22	4.94 mi (7.95 km)	800 yd (730 m)
EF2	A strong multiple-vortex tornado snapped 15 wooden power poles.						
EFU	N of Anton (2nd tornado)	Washington	CO	39.8711°N 103.1946°W	00:35–00:40	1 mi (1.6 km)	50 yd (46 m)
EFU	A trained spotter observed a brief cone tornado that remained over open country, causing no damage.						
EFU	NNW of Anton	Washington	CO	39.83°N 103.25°W	00:45–01:00	1.02 mi (1.64 km)	—N/a
EFU	A trained spotter observed a tornado over open country. No damage occurred.						
EFU	NE of Whiteflat	Motley	TX	34.12°N 100.85°W	00:50–00:51	0.18 mi (0.29 km)	30 yd (27 m)
EFU	Storm chasers reported a brief tornado that remained over open country. It did not cause damage.						
EF3	NE of Whiteflat to S of Matador	Motley	TX	34.12°N 100.85°W	00:51–01:09	9.14 mi (14.71 km)	600 yd (550 m)
EF3	4 deaths – See section on this tornado – 15 people were injured.						
EF0	SE of Lemmon	Perkins	SD	45.8581°N 102.0424°W	01:19–01:21	1.76 mi (2.83 km)	50 yd (46 m)
EF0	A tornado touched down and moved across open fields. No damage was reported.						
EFU	NE of Afton	Dickens	TX	33.82°N 100.73°W	01:36–01:37	0.06 mi (0.097 km)	30 yd (27 m)
EFU	An off-duty National Weather Service employee reported a brief tornado over open country. It did not cause damage.						
EFU	WSW of Matador	Motley	TX	34.01°N 100.89°W	01:37–01:40	2.82 mi (4.54 km)	100 yd (91 m)
EFU	Local media streamed footage of a tornado. It remained over open country did not cause damage.						
EFU	SW of Yoder	Goshen	WY	41.886°N 104.344°W	01:44–01:46	1.01 mi (1.63 km)	50 yd (46 m)
EFU	A trained spotter reported a stovepipe tornado before it quickly became rain-wrapped. No damage occurred.						
EFU	E of Dickens	Dickens	TX	33.62°N 100.72°W	02:18–02:19	0.35 mi (0.56 km)	50 yd (46 m)
EFU	A storm chaser reported a brief tornado that touched down in an open field. It did not cause damage.						

=== June 22 event ===
List of confirmed tornadoes – Thursday, June 22, 2023
EF#	Location	County / Parish	State	Start Coord.	Time (UTC)	Path length	Max width
EF1	Northern Kinston	Lenoir	NC	35.285°N 77.586°W	17:04–17:05	0.7 mi (1.1 km)	100 yd (91 m)
EF1	This tornado touched down in the northern part of Kinston, where at least six large windows at a furniture store were bowed in or shattered, and a large AC unit on the top of the store was blown off. The exterior wall of a Salvation Army store was bowed out, a box truck parked nearby had a window blown out, and a dumpster was tossed about 100 yards (91 m). Some homes had minor damage to siding and shutters, a garden shed was blown off its foundation, and multiple trees were snapped. The tornado impacted UNC Health Care Lenoir, damaging an entrance sign and causing damage to a large section of a medical building's roof. A wooden power pole was snapped in half about 6 feet (1.8 m) off the ground, and power lines were downed as well.						
EF1	NW of Allison	Hemphill	TX	35.7°N 100.23°W	20:41–20:55	10.3 mi (16.6 km)	150 yd (140 m)
EF1	Many trees were snapped or uprooted and two silos had their lids torn off, causing one of them to collapse. Two sheds and a barn had minor roof damage.						
EF1	Highlands Ranch	Douglas	CO	39.5559°N 105.0159°W	21:24–21:48	6.3 mi (10.1 km)	25 yd (23 m)
EF1	A rain-wrapped tornado moved though the Denver suburb of Highlands Ranch, snapping or uprooting many trees and toppling fences. Several houses had roof and window damage, one of which had a section of its roof torn off. Northridge Elementary School sustained considerable roof damage, and a tree was blown over onto the building. Valor Christian High School had windows blown out and also sustained damage to its athletic fields.						
EFU	S of Chugwater	Laramie	WY	41.653°N 104.8794°W	22:42–22:45	3.12 mi (5.02 km)	50 yd (46 m)
EFU	A tornado briefly touched down over open country, causing no known damage.						
EF0	SSE of Peyton	El Paso	CO	38.95°N 104.42°W	02:08–02:10	0.85 mi (1.37 km)	10 yd (9.1 m)
EF0	A cone tornado caused minor damage to structures.						

=== June 23 event ===
List of confirmed tornadoes – Friday, June 23, 2023
EF#	Location	County / Parish	State	Start Coord.	Time (UTC)	Path length	Max width
EF0	N of Grace	Caribou	ID	42.6424°N 111.72°W	18:30–18:40	0.2 mi (0.32 km)	10 yd (9.1 m)
EF0	A weak tornado over an open field was photographed. No damage occurred.						
EF0	NE of Grainger	Sweetwater	WY	41.6721°N 109.8193°W	19:35–19:37	1.55 mi (2.49 km)	30 yd (27 m)
EF0	A landspout tornado was caught on video. It remained over open country and caused no damage.						
EF0	N of Natrona	Natrona	WY	43.2326°N 106.82°W	20:37–20:40	2.21 mi (3.56 km)	30 yd (27 m)
EF0	A rope tornado remained over open country, causing no damage.						
EF0	N of Kaycee	Johnson	WY	43.7345°N 106.65°W	20:40–20:41	0.53 mi (0.85 km)	40 yd (37 m)
EF0	A rancher reported a brief tornado. It remained over open country and caused no damage.						
EF1	SSW of Midwest to ESE of Edgerton	Natrona	WY	43.2997°N 106.3486°W	21:15–21:25	10.83 mi (17.43 km)	100 yd (91 m)
EF1	A house had a large section of its roof torn off as result of this high-end EF1 tornado. A trailer was overturned, fuel tanks were blown away, and trees were damaged.						
EFU	ESE of Ross	Converse	WY	43.43°N 105.84°W	22:33	0.25 mi (0.40 km)	50 yd (46 m)
EFU	A brief tornado touched down in an open field and caused no damage.						
EFU	ENE of Chugwater (1st tornado)	Platte	WY	41.7745°N 104.7474°W	23:11	0.01 mi (0.016 km)	50 yd (46 m)
EFU	A tornado briefly touched down in an open field. No damage occurred.						
EFU	ENE of Chugwater (2nd tornado)	Goshen	WY	41.794°N 104.646°W	23:29–23:37	3 mi (4.8 km)	50 yd (46 m)
EFU	Numerous photos and videos showed a cone tornado that remained over open country, causing no damage.						
EF2	North Antelope Rochelle Mine to WSW of Rochelle	Campbell, Weston	WY	43.4986°N 105.3563°W	23:59–00:20	9.81 mi (15.79 km)	800 yd (730 m)
EF2	A strong tornado touched down near the Campbell/Converse County Line, initially snapping wooden power poles. It moved northeast and struck the North Antelope Rochelle Mine, the largest coal mine in the world. The operations area was directly impacted, where some metal buildings were damaged and cars, buses, and shipping containers were flipped or thrown. Twelve cars on an empty train were knocked over as well, and eight employees were injured. The tornado continued into Weston County, downing trees and partially unroofing a house before dissipating.						
EFU	W of Hawk Springs	Goshen	WY	41.7728°N 104.4151°W	00:03–00:04	0.5 mi (0.80 km)	50 yd (46 m)
EFU	Storm spotters photographed and took video of a brief tornado that remained over open country. No damage occurred.						
EF2	S of Hawk Springs	Goshen	WY	41.7762°N 104.2608°W	00:21–00:37	4.72 mi (7.60 km)	800 yd (730 m)
EF2	This strong tornado quickly became rain-wrapped after it touched down. An irrigation pivot was partially ripped from its concrete base, numerous power poles were snapped, and trees were snapped or uprooted. A small shed was swept away and destroyed, a barn was leveled, and a house had a tree branch impaled into its stucco siding. A railroad crossing sign was pulled out of the ground, and an 18-wheeler was flipped on US 85, injuring the driver.						
EF1	SE of Campo to W of Elkhart, KS	Baca	CO	37.03°N 102.33°W	00:33–00:56	8.43 mi (13.57 km)	100 yd (91 m)
EF1	A long-lived tornado remained mostly over open county, though two structures at an abandoned farmstead were damaged and some power poles were downed.						
EF3	SSW of Granada	Prowers	CO	37.9756°N 102.388°W	00:40–01:22	13.12 mi (21.11 km)	320 yd (290 m)
EF3	This intense tornado remained mainly over open country, but caused major damage at a farmstead. A house on the property was completely destroyed and had only part of one interior wall still standing. Two barns were completely swept away with very little debris remaining, vehicles and pieces of farm machinery were thrown and destroyed, and trees were denuded and debarked. A metal-framed outbuilding was obliterated with only some mangled beams left behind, and a concrete footing was pulled out of the ground at that location. Eight cattle were killed at the farmstead. The tornado moved southeast from the farm, looped over its own path in an open field, and downed some wooden power poles before it dissipated. This was the strongest tornado to impact Colorado since an EF3 tornado that struck areas near Berthoud on June 4, 2015.						
EF1	E of Hawk Springs	Goshen	WY	41.78°N 104.14°W	00:44–00:58	3.9 mi (6.3 km)	20 yd (18 m)
EF1	This was the third and final tornado near Hawk Springs. An outbuilding collapsed and a few light poles and flag poles were bent.						
EFU	W of Gering	Scotts Bluff	NE	41.821°N 103.938°W	01:04–01:11	3.53 mi (5.68 km)	50 yd (46 m)
EFU	A tornado moved over open fields near Gunsight Pass, causing no damage.						
EFU	W of Gering	Scotts Bluff	NE	41.85°N 103.85°W	01:22–01:27	3.16 mi (5.09 km)	50 yd (46 m)
EFU	Storm spotters observed a tornado that became rain-wrapped over open fields near Rifle Sight Pass. No damage occurred.						
EFU	S of Holly	Prowers	CO	37.86°N 102.14°W	01:23	unknown	unknown
EFU	A tornado occurred over open country, causing no damage.						
EF2	E of Gering to SE of Scottsbluff	Scotts Bluff	NE	41.82°N 103.63°W	01:38–01:45	2.48 mi (3.99 km)	700 yd (640 m)
EF2	A strong multiple-vortex tornado formed east of Gering and crossed the North Platte River as it moved northeast, prompting a tornado emergency. A house had major structural damage to the southeast of Scottsbluff, sustaining loss of its roof and some exterior walls. Debris was scattered up to 0.5 mi (0.80 km) away from the house, cars on the property were thrown up to 50 feet (15 meters) away, and a small wooden trailer was thrown a quarter-mile. Power poles were snapped and irrigation pivots were overturned elsewhere along the path. The tornado passed over wastewater treatment ponds, sucking water from them before dissipating. A man was injured inside a vehicle that was flipped.						
EF0	N of Johnson City	Stanton	KS	37.67°N 101.75°W	01:40	0.01 mi (0.016 km)	1 yd (0.91 m)
EF0	A storm chaser reported a tornado. It remained over open country and caused no damage.						
EF1	SE of Gering	Scotts Bluff	NE	41.81°N 103.62°W	01:44–01:47	1.24 mi (2.00 km)	50 yd (46 m)
EF1	This tornado was spawned by a secondary circulation just south of the stronger Scottsbluff EF2 tornado. A quonset hut collapsed and several power poles were snapped.						
EFU	ESE of Gering	Scotts Bluff	NE	41.81°N 103.59°W	01:50	0.5 mi (0.80 km)	50 yd (46 m)
EFU	A trained spotter reported a rain-wrapped tornado over open country. No damage occurred.						
EFU	W of Minatare	Scotts Bluff	NE	41.82°N 103.54°W	02:05	0.5 mi (0.80 km)	50 yd (46 m)
EFU	A trained spotter reported a tornado over open country. No damage occurred.						
EF0	NE of Johnson City to NW of Ulysses	Stanton, Grant	KS	37.65°N 101.56°W	02:09–02:12	4.2 mi (6.8 km)	1 yd (0.91 m)
EF0	A storm chaser reported a tornado over open country. No damage occurred						
EFU	ENE of Johnson City	Stanton	KS	37.59°N 101.56°W	02:15–02:17	1.2 mi (1.9 km)	unknown
EFU	A cone tornado remained over open country, causing no damage.						
EFU	E of Lynn	Morrill	NE	41.81°N 102.85°W	03:51	0.5 mi (0.80 km)	50 yd (46 m)
EFU	A storm chaser reported a brief tornado that caused no damage.						

=== June 24 event ===
List of confirmed tornadoes – Saturday, June 24, 2023
EF#	Location	County / Parish	State	Start Coord.	Time (UTC)	Path length	Max width
EFU	N of Lake Park (1st tornado)	Becker	MN	46.9710°N 96.0987°W	20:20–20:23	1.98 mi (3.19 km)	—N/a
EFU	Local broadcast media photographed a tornado. It remained over an open field and caused no damage.						
EFU	NW of Borup	Norman	MN	47.2474°N 96.5981°W	20:25–20:30	2.35 mi (3.78 km)	—N/a
EFU	A trained spotter observed a tornado over an open field. No damage occurred.						
EFU	W of Waubun	Mahnomen	MN	47.1883°N 96.0597°W	20:54	—N/a	—N/a
EFU	A brief tornado touched down in an open field, causing no damage.						
EFU	S of Waubun	Mahnomen	MN	47.1588°N 95.9469°W	21:03	—N/a	—N/a
EFU	A brief tornado touched down in an open field, causing no damage.						
EFU	NE of Shelly	Norman, Polk	MN	47.4946°N 96.734°W	21:10–21:16	1.45 mi (2.33 km)	—N/a
EFU	This tornado remained over open fields. No damage occurred.						
EF0	SW of Lockhart	Norman	MN	47.4061°N 96.5992°W	21:12–21:15	2.03 mi (3.27 km)	20 yd (18 m)
EF0	A brief tornado damaged trees in a shelterbelt.						
EF2	E of Mahnomen	Mahnomen	MN	47.2542°N 95.9378°W	21:15–21:40	7 mi (11 km)	250 yd (230 m)
EF2	An intermittent but strong multiple-vortex tornado damaged several farmsteads. A two-story house had its entire roof torn off, a metal quonset hut was caved in, and a garage was shifted off its foundation and collapsed. Several fuel tanks were thrown over a barn into a shed, knocking it off its foundation. Multiple trees were snapped or uprooted, some power poles were snapped, and crop damage occurred as well.						
EFU	NW of Lockhart	Norman	MN	47.5498°N 96.6392°W	21:25	—N/a	—N/a
EFU	A brief tornado touched down over an open field. No damage occurred.						
EFU	N of Lake Park (2nd tornado)	Becker	MN	47.1293°N 96.0770°W	21:36	—N/a	—N/a
EFU	A brief tornado touched down. No damage occurred.						
EFU	WNW of Beltrami	Polk	MN	47.5498°N 96.6392°W	21:44	—N/a	—N/a
EFU	A brief tornado touched down over open fields and caused no damage.						
EFU	NW of Beltrami (1st tornado)	Polk	MN	47.5757°N 96.6085°W	21:49–21:52	0.99 mi (1.59 km)	—N/a
EFU	A tornado moved through open fields, causing no damage.						
EFU	WNW of Beltrami (2nd tornado)	Polk	MN	47.5683°N 96.6431°W	21:52	—N/a	—N/a
EFU	A brief tornado touched down over an open field and caused no damage.						
EF0	E of Walcott to Northern Davenport	Scott	IA	41.6041°N 90.7113°W	03:31–03:45	9.63 mi (15.50 km)	20 yd (18 m)
EF0	A weak tornado touched down east of Walcott, leaving swirl marks in grassy fields as it moved east. It then moved into the northern outskirts of Davenport, where tree branches were snapped and a gas station canopy sustained minor damage at a Flying J truck stop. It also struck the Davenport Airport, where the Quad City Air Show was being held. Damage to tents, canopies, and equipment occurred at the airport before the tornado continued east, causing some additional minor damage to trees and structures before dissipating.						
EF0	N of Pocahontas to SW of Rolfe	Pocahontas	IA	42.7772°N 94.6547°W	04:02–04:07	2.77 mi (4.46 km)	80 yd (73 m)
EF0	A weak tornado moved a grain bin off its foundation and rolled it into a field.						

=== June 25 event ===
List of confirmed tornadoes – Sunday, June 25, 2023
EF#	Location	County / Parish	State	Start Coord.	Time (UTC)	Path length	Max width
EF2	Southern Greenwood to W of New Whiteland	Johnson	IN	39.5692°N 86.221°W	20:12–20:23	5.4 mi (8.7 km)	400 yd (370 m)
EF2	This strong tornado quickly developed and intensified as it moved east, producing significant damage early on, where bricks were blown off a large home, roofs were damaged, a trailer was displaced into a nearby yard, trees were snapped, and a few power poles were broken. Continuing east through residential neighborhoods, it caused substantial roof damage to homes, snapped and uprooted trees. Near SR 135, the tornado tore the roof off part of an apartment building under construction, broke windows, and drove debris into the ground. The tornado then turned southeast across open land, snapping and uprooting numerous trees where it then lifted.						
EF1	S of Crane	Daviess, Martin	IN	38.887°N 86.958°W	20:21–20:30	3.73 mi (6.00 km)	100 yd (91 m)
EF1	A tornado snapped and uprooted many trees as it moved through areas in and around the Naval Surface Warfare Center Crane Division grounds.						
EF1	WSW of Buenavista to SSE of Kirksville	Monroe	IN	39.0287°N 86.6745°W	20:30–20:37	4.45 mi (7.16 km)	100 yd (91 m)
EF1	A couple of homes suffered extensive roof damage, another house had a window blown out, and multiple barns and outbuildings were damaged or destroyed. Many trees were snapped or uprooted, and several fences were knocked over as well.						
EF2	SSW of Hindostan Falls to WNW of Hillham	Martin, Dubois	IN	38.585°N 86.8666°W	20:34–20:46	9.12 mi (14.68 km)	565 yd (517 m)
EF2	1 death – This strong tornado touched down in a rural area, where a house suffered major roof damage and had its attached garage destroyed. A car was also flipped at this location. The tornado then moved southeastward and caused some ground scouring in open farm fields before it continued into the Hoosier National Forest, where it snapped and uprooted countless large trees. It reached peak intensity as it moved through the rural community of Rusk, where a two-story cabin was completely destroyed, trees were downed, and some power poles were snapped. One person was killed and another was injured in the cabin. The tornado continued to the southeast through remote wooded areas, snapping and uprooting a large swath of trees and destroying some outbuildings before dissipating.						
EF1	ENE of Dover	Pope	AR	35.4178°N 93.0723°W	21:19–21:20	0.6 mi (0.97 km)	50 yd (46 m)
EF1	A brief tornado snapped and uprooted trees along its path.						
EFU	NE of Marche	Pulaski	AR	34.9199°N 92.3054°W	22:37–22:38	0.2 mi (0.32 km)	50 yd (46 m)
EFU	A tornado was photographed over a heavily forested area of Camp Robinson, however it was non-surveyable due to widespread wind damage in the area.						
EF2	W of Cecilia	Hardin	KY	37.682°N 86.0133°W	02:27–02:32	1.17 mi (1.88 km)	300 yd (270 m)
EF2	This strong tornado partially or completely unroofed a few homes near the rural community of Franklin Crossroads. A carport was torn from one house and thrown into a field, and some barns and outbuildings were damaged or destroyed as well. Two vehicles were moved, an RV was knocked over, and a gazebo was thrown. Large trees were snapped or uprooted and some crop damage also occurred.						
EF1	Southwestern Jamestown	Russell	KY	36.9757°N 85.0861°W	04:25–04:26	0.67 mi (1.08 km)	300 yd (270 m)
EF1	A brief high-end EF1 tornado touched down in the southwestern part of Jamestown, where an apartment building and a carpet business both sustained considerable roof damage, and two other buildings had their gabled porch roofs torn off. A small automotive museum and an auto parts store had windows blown out, and a cinder block garage was destroyed. Many trees were snapped or uprooted, and a tree branch was speared through the exterior wall of a house.						

=== June 26 event ===
List of confirmed tornadoes – Monday, June 26, 2023
EF#	Location	County / Parish	State	Start Coord.	Time (UTC)	Path length	Max width
EF0	ENE of Martins Creek to SW of Belvidere, NJ	Northampton	PA	40.7904°N 75.1453°W	18:58–19:04	3.37 mi (5.42 km)	60 yd (55 m)
EF0	A tornado moved through wheat fields, causing minor damage to crops.						
EF1	Bernardsville	Somerset	NJ	40.7109°N 74.5804°W	19:29–19:34	1.38 mi (2.22 km)	475 yd (434 m)
EF1	A brief tornado snapped or uprooted numerous trees in Bernardsville, some of which fell on cars and power lines.						
EF1	W of Albin	Laramie	WY	41.411°N 104.339°W	00:42–00:50	3.57 mi (5.75 km)	1,000 yd (910 m)
EF1	A house sustained roof damage and an outbuilding was destroyed, with debris strewn hundreds of yards away. Hay bales weighing up to 1,400 pounds (640 kg) were thrown up to 0.5 miles (0.80 km) away. Eight old wooden power poles were snapped shortly before the tornado dissipated.						
EF1	SW of Albin	Laramie	WY	41.365°N 104.28°W	00:52–01:05	3.55 mi (5.71 km)	1,000 yd (910 m)
EF1	A large tornado snapped eleven wooden power poles.						
EF0	SSE Albin	Laramie	WY	41.316°N 104.061°W	01:18	0.1 mi (0.16 km)	50 yd (46 m)
EF0	A brief tornado overturned an irrigation pivot.						
EF1	SW of Kimball	Kimball	NE	41.194°N 103.758°W	02:01–02:05	1.56 mi (2.51 km)	100 yd (91 m)
EF1	A rope tornado touched down south of I-80 and impacted a farmstead, where a cinder block outbuilding was destroyed and debris was tossed up to 50 yards (46 m) away. A shipping container was shifted off its foundation and a 20,000 pounds (9,100 kg) tandem-disk plow was moved 15 feet (4.6 m).						
EFU	S of Kimball	Kimball	NE	41.2°N 103.66°W	02:29	0.5 mi (0.80 km)	50 yd (46 m)
EFU	An NWS Employee observed a brief tornado. No damage occurred.						

=== June 27 event ===
List of confirmed tornadoes – Tuesday, June 27, 2023
EF#	Location	County / Parish	State	Start Coord.	Time (UTC)	Path length	Max width
EF0	W of Hines	Harney	OR	43.5743°N 119.3324°W	20:00–21:00	2.13 mi (3.43 km)	50 yd (46 m)
EF0	A pilot reported a small tornado. No damage occurred.						
EF0	NE of Milton-Freewater	Umatilla	OR	45.9775°N 118.2793°W	23:40–00:05	0.11 mi (0.18 km)	10 yd (9.1 m)
EF0	A small, weak landspout tornado touched down in a farm field. No damage occurred.						
EFU	S of Adams	Texas	OK	36.7131°N 101.0738°W	00:28–00:29	0.09 mi (0.14 km)	25 yd (23 m)
EFU	A storm chaser documented a tornado that remained over open country, causing no damage.						

=== June 28 event ===
List of confirmed tornadoes – Wednesday, June 28, 2023
EF#	Location	County / Parish	State	Start Coord.	Time (UTC)	Path length	Max width
EF0	SW of Kimball	Kimball	NE	41.087°N 103.778°W	00:35–00:45	6.8 mi (10.9 km)	425 yd (389 m)
EF0	This large, dusty tornado was caught on video and photographed by many storm chasers. It ripped shingles off a farmhouse, pushed an auger about 5 feet (1.5 m), and blew a calving hut about 20 feet (6.1 m). An electrical pole was snapped at its base, a plastic 5-US-gallon (19 L) bucket was thrown about 0.5 miles (0.80 km), and tree limbs were broken.						
EFU	SSW of Kimball	Kimball	NE	41.063°N 103.706°W	00:47–00:49	0.25 mi (0.40 km)	50 yd (46 m)
EFU	A satellite tornado to the previous tornado was caught on video as it remained over open farmland, causing no damage.						
EFU	NE of Iliff	Logan	CO	40.78°N 103.01°W	02:12–02:13	0.01 mi (0.016 km)	25 yd (23 m)
EFU	A tornado touched down briefly in open country. No damage was observed.						
EFU	NE of Iliff	Logan	CO	40.78°N 103.01°W	03:13	0.01 mi (0.016 km)	25 yd (23 m)
EFU	A brief tornado occurred, causing no observable damage.						

=== June 29 event ===
List of confirmed tornadoes – Thursday, June 29, 2023
EF#	Location	County / Parish	State	Start Coord.	Time (UTC)	Path length	Max width
EF1	SW of Kahoka	Clark	MO	40.41°N 91.79°W	15:10–15:13	2.21 mi (3.56 km)	30 yd (27 m)
EF1	This tornado was embedded within a developing derecho. One outbuilding was severely damaged, with debris tossed up to 50 yards (46 m) away. Several trees were downed and crop damage occurred.						
EF2	S of Curran to SE of Chatham	Sangamon	IL	39.7195°N 89.7715°W	17:12–17:19	9.07 mi (14.60 km)	800 yd (730 m)
EF2	The most significant damage from this tornado occurred at the very beginning of its path, where a one-story house had most of its roof ripped off, a second house sustained less severe damage, and a detached garage was heavily damaged. The tornado then tracked sharply southeastward, downing trees and power poles, destroying an outbuilding, and inflicting roof and siding damage to a few homes. It then moved directly through Chatham, where a house had half of its roof torn off, many other homes suffered more minor roof damage, and numerous trees were snapped or uprooted. Additional minor tree, power pole, and roof damage occurred as the tornado exited town, crossed I-55, and then dissipated.						
EF1	N of Lincoln to SSW of Lawndale	Logan	IL	40.1672°N 89.3796°W	17:26–17:30	4.79 mi (7.71 km)	100 yd (91 m)
EF1	A tornado formed at the north edge of Lincoln at Kickapoo Creek Park, where tree limbs were downed and treetops were snapped off. It continued to the northeast outside of town, damaging or snapping multiple wooden power poles and causing some additional tree damage. A semi-trailer was rolled and destroyed, and a metal highway sign was damaged as well.						
EFU	NW of Palmer	Christian	IL	39.5177°N 89.4954°W	17:27–17:28	0.76 mi (1.22 km)	40 yd (37 m)
EFU	Satellite imagery showed that a tornado touched down and traveled through farm fields, only damaging crops.						
EF1	N of Kincaid	Christian	IL	39.6141°N 89.4251°W	17:29–17:32	3.45 mi (5.55 km)	200 yd (180 m)
EF1	A metal farm building was demolished, a house had roof and siding damage, and trees were snapped. The top of a power pole was snapped off as well.						
EF1	S of Mt. Auburn	Christian	IL	39.7486°N 89.2669°W	17:33–17:34	0.98 mi (1.58 km)	150 yd (140 m)
EF1	Satellite imagery showed that a tornado damaged multiple trees.						
EF1	SW of Waynesville to Wapella	Logan, DeWitt	IL	40.2107°N 89.1755°W	17:35–17:46	14.18 mi (22.82 km)	800 yd (730 m)
EF1	This tornado first moved through rural areas near Waynesville and caused a farm building to collapse, produced tree and power pole damage, inflicted minor roof damage to a two-story home, and damaged or destroyed multiple grain bins. It then struck Wapella, where several homes had roof and window damage, fencing was blown over, and trees and tree branches were snapped. The tornado continued east of Wapella, overturning pivot irrigation sprinklers and causing some additional tree damage before dissipating.						
EF1	NE of Taylorville to NW of Assumption	Christian	IL	40.2107°N 89.1755°W	17:38–17:47	10.36 mi (16.67 km)	200 yd (180 m)
EF1	A house had a significant portion its roof structure destroyed, and a 101 mile-per-hour wind gust was recorded at that location. A few other homes suffered minor damage and some outbuildings were also damaged. Trees and power poles were downed, and some crop damage occurred as well.						

=== June 30 event ===
List of confirmed tornadoes – Friday, June 30, 2023
EF#	Location	County / Parish	State	Start Coord.	Time (UTC)	Path length	Max width
EFU	WNW of Hartsel	Park	CO	39.04°N 105.9°W	15:00–15:01	0.01 mi (0.016 km)	25 yd (23 m)
EFU	A tornado touched down briefly over open country. No damage was observed.						
EFU	SW of Byers	Elbert	CO	39.55°N 104.31°W	17:40–17:43	0.01 mi (0.016 km)	25 yd (23 m)
EFU	A brief tornado that caused no damage occurred over open fields.						
EFU	NNW of Seibert	Kit Carson	CO	39.3948°N 102.9241°W	19:46–19:47	0.12 mi (0.19 km)	100 yd (91 m)
EFU	Several storm chasers filmed a brief tornado. No damage occurred.						
EFU	NNW of Stratton	Kit Carson	CO	39.4099°N 102.6614°W	20:19–20:22	0.06 mi (0.097 km)	75 yd (69 m)
EFU	A brief tornado caused no damage.						
EFU	SE of Model	Las Animas	CO	37.27°N 104.15°W	20:45–20:48	2.08 mi (3.35 km)	10 yd (9.1 m)
EFU	A brief tornado was observed. No damage occurred.						
EF0	W of Cripple Creek	Teller, Park	CO	38.77°N 105.32°W	23:30–23:49	3.02 mi (4.86 km)	30 yd (27 m)
EF0	Trees were uprooted, and the roof of a house was damaged as a result of this weak tornado.						

== See also ==
- Tornadoes of 2023
- List of United States tornadoes from April to May 2023
- List of United States tornadoes from July to August 2023
