= List of United States tornadoes in 2023 =

List of United States tornadoes in 2023 may refer to:

- List for January to February 2023
- List for March 2023
- List for April to May 2023
- List for June 2023
