= Florida Central Railroad =

Florida Central Railroad may refer to:

- Florida Central Railroad (1868–1882), a railroad in Florida that became part of the Florida Railway and Navigation Company and later the Seaboard Air Line Railroad
- Florida Central Railroad (1907–1914), a railroad in Florida and Georgia that became part of the Atlantic Coast Line Railroad
- Florida Central Railroad (current), a short line running northwest from Orlando
