= Giacomo Beltrami =

Italian explorer (1779–1855)

Giacomo Costantino Beltrami (detail from an 1861 painting, six years after Beltrami's death, by Enrico Scuri)

Giacomo Costantino Beltrami (1779 – January 6, 1855) was an Italian jurist, author, and explorer, known for claiming to have discovered the headwaters of the Mississippi River in 1823 while on a trip through much of the United States (later expeditions determined a different source). In Minnesota, Beltrami (in Polk County) and Beltrami County are named for him. He had an extensive network of notable figures for friends and acquaintances, including members of the powerful Medici family.

== Early life ==
Beltrami was born in the city of Bergamo in the northern Italian region of Lombardy, the 16th of 17 children. His exact birth date is unknown because a fire destroyed baptismal records in 1793. He apparently had a fair amount of schooling in literature, law, and other subjects before leaving to become a soldier for the Cisalpine Republic in 1797. The republic was then an extension of France, and Beltrami worked his way into the Napoleonic government after becoming a Mason. Years later, when the Marche region again came under purview of the papal government, he was questioned for his activities.

Beltrami was married to the sister of Count Pietro Bastogi, a notable Italian railway financier.

In 1809, Beltrami became the friend of Giulia Spada de Medici. When she died at the age of 39 in 1820, he put together a collection of writings in her honor. He was distraught by her death, and this, combined with questions about his background during French occupation, led him to travel abroad. He visited a number of cities in Europe, reaching Liverpool, England in 1822. From there, he sailed to the United States; after two months at sea he arrived in Philadelphia, Pennsylvania in December 1822 or January 1823.

== Exploring North America ==
In the U.S. he also began visiting a number of cities. He eventually began a voyage down the Ohio River with the intention of following it to the Mississippi and then south to New Orleans, Louisiana. While on board he met with the prominent United States Indian agent, Lawrence Taliaferro, who was planning to travel upriver on the Mississippi. Beltrami soon became obsessed with the idea of finding the river's source. In 1823, the two later joined with Stephen H. Long as they traveled upriver to Fort Saint Anthony.

Beltrami followed Long and Taliaferro as they went about exploring and mapping, and interacting with the local Native American tribes. In July, after about three months of this, tension began to grow between Beltrami and the others. He eventually split from their expedition in August, when the group had reached Pembina, and instead set off with some Ojibwe Indian guides on his personal quest to find the source of the river. After only a week and a half, his guides abandoned him and he had to carry on alone, seeking help from others he encountered. At some point Beltrami collected two indigenous flutes, which he later sent back to Italy along with his collection of other Native American artifacts. One of these flutes is the oldest extant Native American flute, and is now in the collection of the Museo Civico di Scienze Naturali in Bergamo, Italy.

On August 28, he found what he believed was the source of the Mississippi River, as well as the Red River of the North. He named the place Giulia after his departed friend, and named eight other nearby lakes after her children. He made the return trip downriver to Fort Saint Anthony and continued south to New Orleans, arriving in December. There he began writing an account of his travels thus far. By late January, it was completed, and it was published a few months later.

By that time, Beltrami was on a voyage through Mexico where he collected Aztec objects, classified plants and animals, and observed the area's political system. Particularly because of his work with flora, he eventually was included in several scientific societies of France.

He returned to New Orleans in 1825, but soon left to return to Philadelphia where many copies of his book were being stored. The Catholic church was also displeased, and condemned him and his work. By November, he was partaking in festivities surrounding the opening of New York's Erie Canal.

== Return to Europe ==
After some trips to Haiti, Santo Domingo, and elsewhere, Beltrami made a return trip across the Atlantic in 1826, arriving in London in the late part of the year. He moved to Paris two years later, and joined several scientific societies through the early 1830s.

In 1834, Beltrami moved to Heidelberg, Germany and befriended Josef Anton Mittermaier, a notable jurist of the time. A few years later he finally returned to his estate in Filottrano. He attempted to have his books published in Italy, but the church-led government denied his requests. In his final years, he patterned his life on that of Franciscan friars, and called himself "Fra Giacomo." Most of his time was spent working in his house and garden. He died there in 1855.

== Offices and titles ==
- Ispettore dei Magazzini della Commissione (Turin, 1801)
- Sotto-Ispettore degli Equipaggi (Parma, 1805)
- Cancelliere di Giustizia nel Dipartamento del Taro (Parma, 1805)
- Vice-Ispettore delle Armate (1806)
- Giudice della Corte del Dipartamento del Musone (Macerata, 1809)
- Medaglia d'Onore di Napoli (1815)

== Societal memberships ==
- Accademia dei Catenati di Macerata (1821, under the name Alcandro Grineo)
- Societas Medico-Botanica Londinensis (1828)
- Société Géographie di Paris (1829)
- Ateneo di Bergamo (1832)
- Société Géologique de France (1832)
- Société Universelle de Civilization (1833)
- Société dell'Institut Historique de France (1834)

== Bibliography ==
- Deux Mots sur les promenades de Paris a Liverpool etc. (1823)
- Le découverte des sources du Mississippi (1824)
- A Pilgrimage in Europe and America (1828) – English translation of the first two books, plus some extra material
- Le Mexique (1830)
- L'Italie et L'Europe and L'Italia ossia scoperte (1834) – French and Italian, respectively
