= Fanlew, Florida =

Unincorporated community in Florida, U.S.

- Unincorporated community
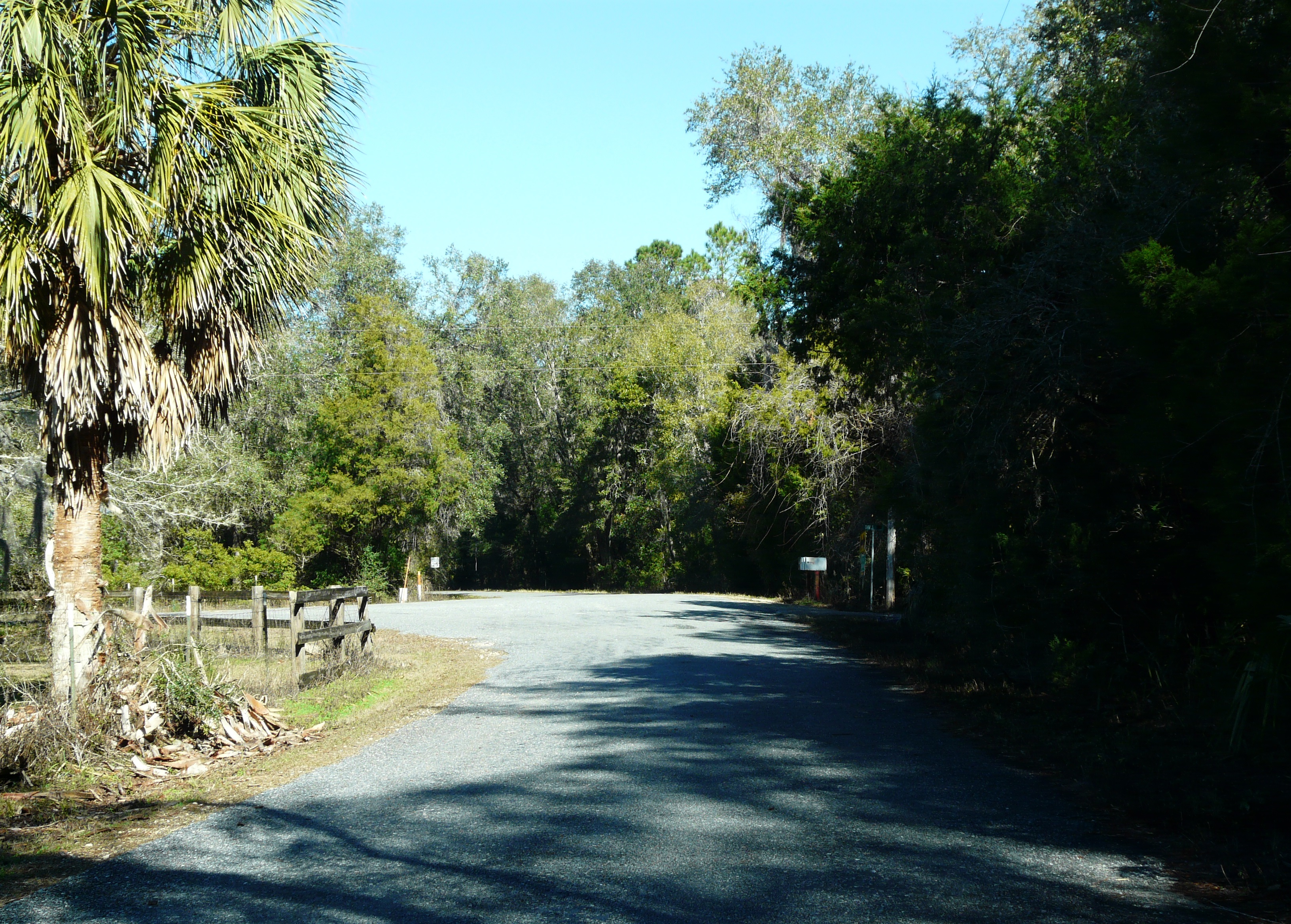
- Fanlew Road and Natural Bridge Road

- Location within Florida Location within the United States
- Coordinates: 30°16′18″N 84°03′27″W
- Country: United States
- State: Florida
- County: Jefferson
- Elevation: 30 ft (9.1 m)
- Time zone: UTC-5 (Eastern (EST))
  - Summer (DST): UTC-4 (EDT)
- ZIP code: 32344
- Area codes: 850; 448
- GNIS feature ID: 295272

Fanlew is an unincorporated community located in southern Jefferson County, Florida, United States.

== Location ==
Fanlew is located west of State Road 59 at Fanlew Road, and at the east end of Natural Bridge Rd., which comes out of neighboring Leon County.

== History ==
Fanlew began as a railway distribution center of the Florida Central Railroad and later the Atlantic Coast Line Railroad. The community served the sawmills and turpentine stills once in the area, with supplies moving in and timber and naval stores moving out. "Fanlew" is a combination of the names of John Lewis Philips, the founder of the Florida Central Railroad, and his wife Fannie.

== Education ==
Jefferson County Schools operates public schools, including Jefferson County Middle / High School.
