= Lockhart, Minnesota =

Lockhart
- Unincorporated community
- Location within Minnesota Location within the United States
- Country: United States
- State: Minnesota
- County: Norman
- Elevation: 896 ft (273 m)
- Time zone: UTC-6 (Central (CST))
  - Summer (DST): UTC-5 (CDT)
- Area code: 218
- GNIS feature ID: 646992

Lockhart is an unincorporated community in Norman County, Minnesota, United States.

The community is located between Ada and Crookston near Minnesota State Highway 9 at County Road 22.

== History ==
A post office called Lockhart was established in 1883, and remained in operation until 1976. The community bears the name of a landowner.
