= 2023 Perryton tornado =

2023 tornado in Texas, U.S.

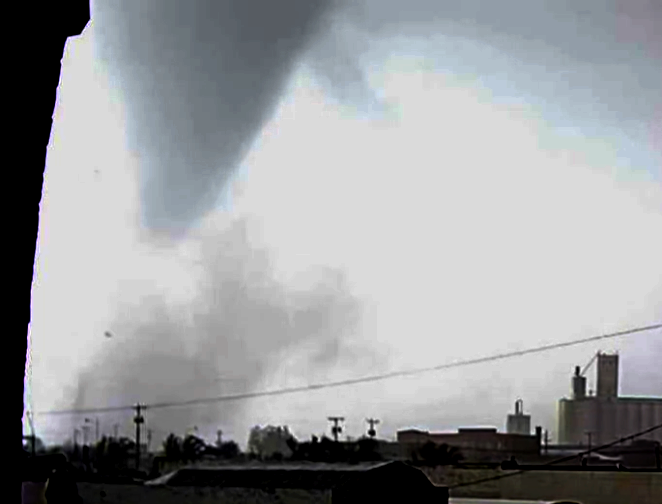
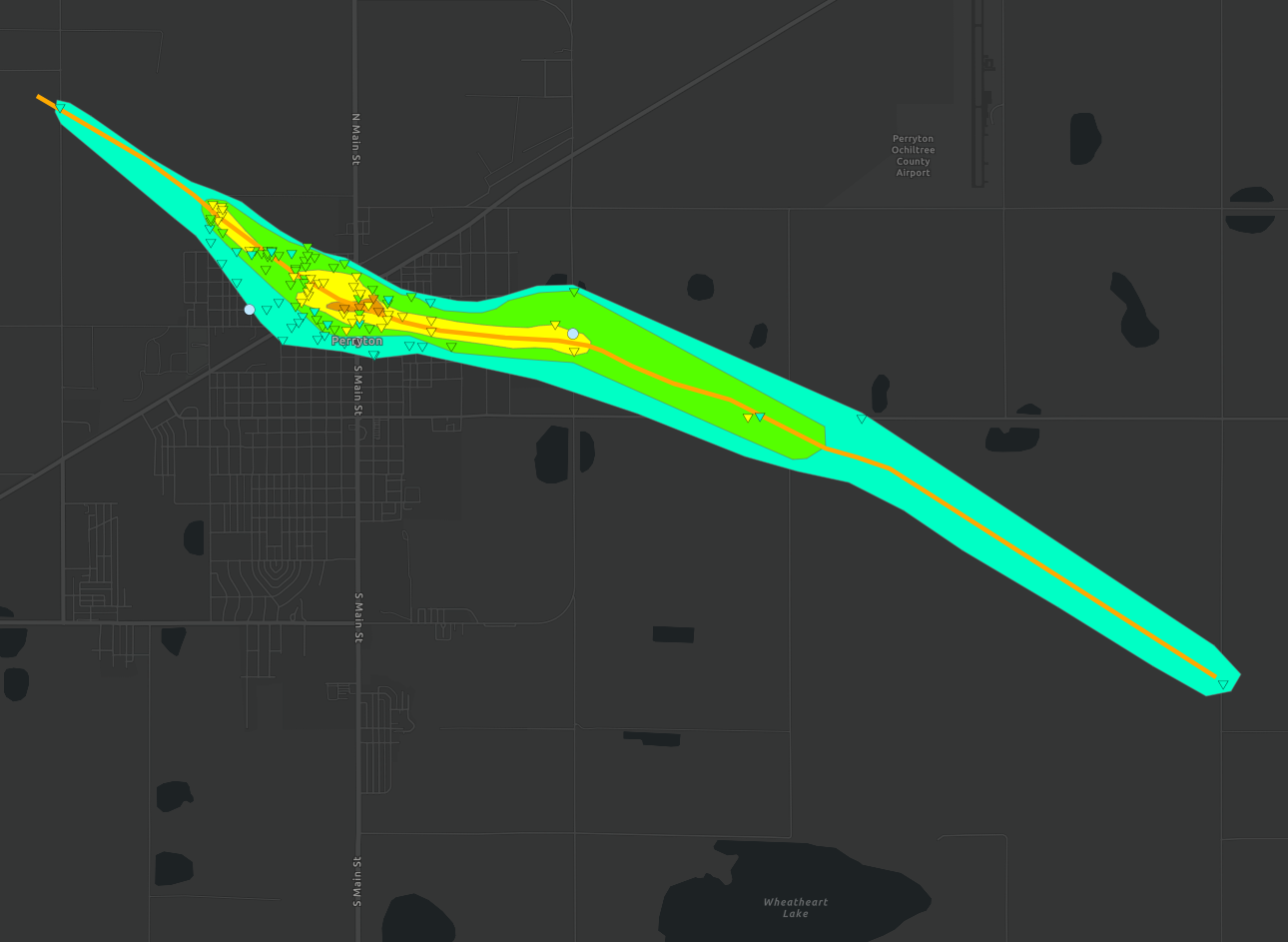
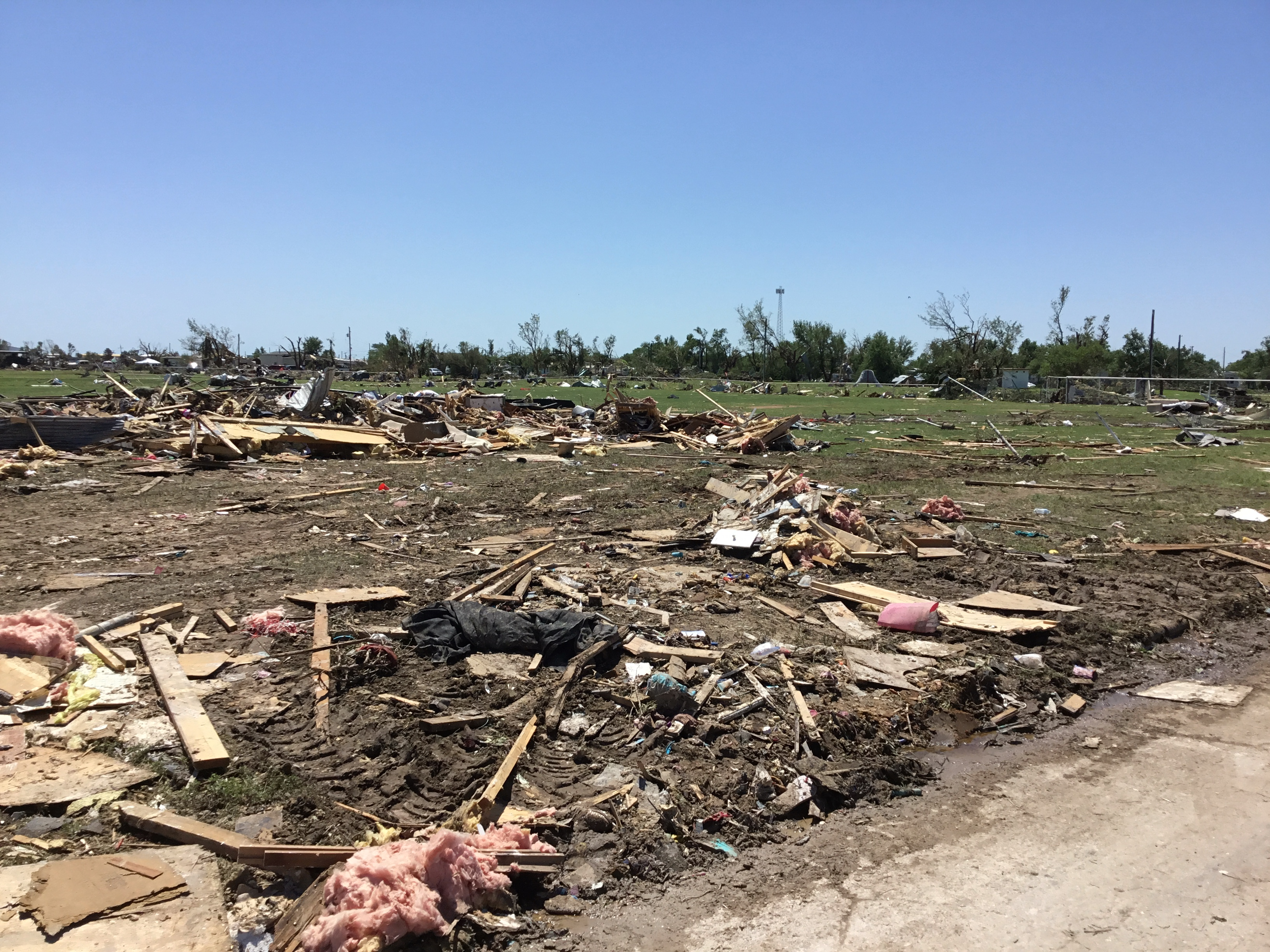
- Clockwise from Top: The tornado within Perryton, as seen from the Ochiltree County Sheriff Office; The remains of several destroyed mobile homes; The track of the tornado

Meteorological history
- Formed: June 15, 2023, 5:06 p.m. CST
- Dissipated: June 15, 2023, 5:17 p.m. CST
- Duration: 11 minutes

EF3 tornado
- on the Enhanced Fujita scale
- Max width: 880 yards (0.50 mi; 0.80 km)
- Path length: 6.31 miles (10.15 km)
- Highest winds: 140 mph (230 km/h)

Overall effects
- Fatalities: 3
- Injuries: >100
- Damage: $1 million (2023 USD)
- Areas affected: Perryton, Texas
- Power outages: 4,500
- Houses destroyed: ~200
- Part of the Tornado outbreak sequence of June 14–19, 2023 and Tornadoes of 2023

During the late afternoon hours of June 15, 2023, an intense and fatal tornado devastated northern portions of Perryton, Texas, United States, killing three people, injuring over 100 others, and inflicting $1 million (2023 USD) (Note: All amounts of money are in 2023 USD unless stated otherwise.) in damages. The tornado destroyed around 200 homes, with many other structures and businesses sustaining damage. The tornado first touched down just to the northwest of Perryton, before tracking southeastward into the city. A mobile home park was significantly impacted, with dozens of trailers being completely destroyed. Several retail stores in the downtown area sustained low-end EF3 damage. The entire city suffered from a power outage following the tornado, as numerous power poles were downed. The tornado tracked 6.31 miles (10.15 km) through Ochiltree County, and was on the ground for 11 minutes. It was the first tornado to impact Perryton since May 26, 2021, and the first lethal tornado in the city since an F1 tornado killed one person on June 11, 1987.

== Meteorological synopsis ==
At 12:00 a.m. CST, (Note: All times listed in the article are in CST unless stated otherwise.) June 15, 2023, the Storm Prediction Center outlined a moderate risk for much of central and northwest Oklahoma, a small northeast portion of the Texas panhandle, and a small portion of southwestern Kansas. A 10% probability for a tornado within 25 miles of a point for much of the same regions was also outlined, alongside a 5% probability for much of Oklahoma, southwest Kansas, and northeast parts of the Texas panhandle and central-to-north Texas, as low-level moisture, strengthening wind shear, high atmospheric instability ahead of a cold front, and an upper-level jet moving into the southern Plains primed the environment within the region for severe storms. As the day progressed, the moderate risk would expand, and by 10:30 a.m., much of western Oklahoma was under this category, along with northeast parts of the Texas panhandle and parts of northern Texas as high amounts of moisture was drawn into the unstable environment by a shortwave trough. Additionally, the 10% probability area expanded and shifted southward, covering a much smaller portion of the same regions. At 11:35 a.m., the Storm Prediction Center issued a public severe weather outlook for much of the southern Plains, noting that a few tornadoes could occur. On the evening of June 15, a squall line began to form over southwest Kansas, before expanding south through portions of Oklahoma and the Texas panhandle. The furthest south supercell within this line of storms would produce the Perryton tornado at 5:06 p.m.

== Tornado summary ==
=== Touchdown and beginning ===
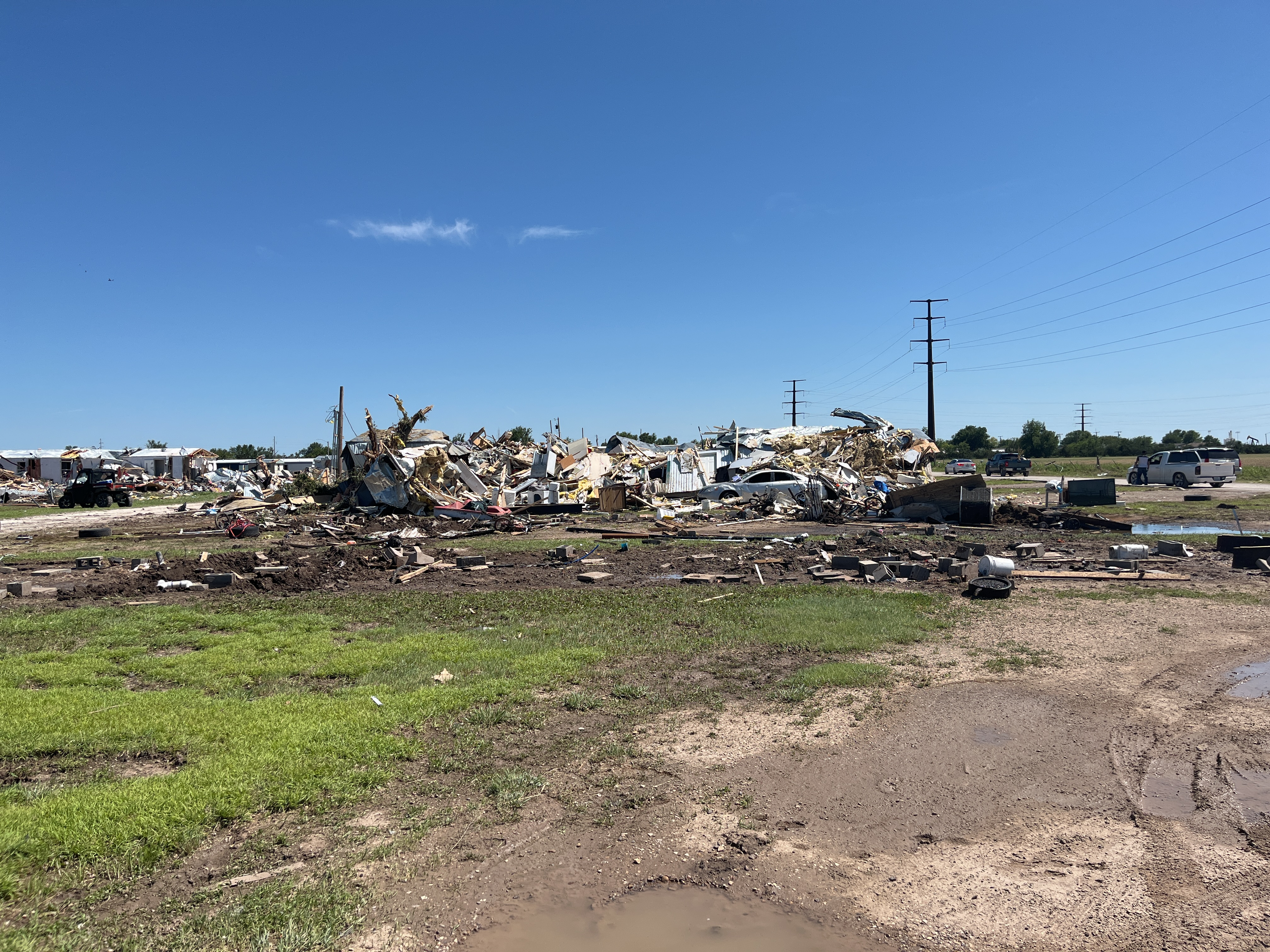
Devastating damage to a mobile home park

The tornado touched down at 5:06 p.m. in Ochiltree County, Texas, just northwest of Perryton. The tornado then began to move southeastward as it snapped branches at EF0 strength, crossing Loop 143 and tracking over a field before intensifying as it entered northwest portions of the city. The tornado struck a trailer park, crossing North Jefferson Street and North Indiana Street as numerous mobile homes were damaged or destroyed, with several being leveled at EF2 intensity with estimated wind speeds of 127 mph (204 km/h). An 11-year-old boy was killed in a trailer home along North Indiana Street. The tornado then crossed a small patch of land before once again entering residential areas, crossing Northwest 2nd Avenue and destroying a mobile home along the street at low-end EF2 strength. The tornado began inflicting EF1 damage to numerous mobile homes and single-family residences as it tracked past the Northwest 2nd Avenue/North Fordham Street intersection.

The tornado, as seen from the Ochiltree County Sheriff Office within Perryton

The tornado continued further into the city, increasing in width as it weakened to EF1 strength. The tornado crossed North Eton Street, snapping tree branches and scattering debris throughout the area. The tornado then tracked across Northwest 1st Avenue before intensifying to EF2 strength once more as it crossed North Drake Street, completely destroying a mobile home with the debris being blown away at EF2 intensity with estimated wind speeds of 127 mph (204 km/h). Several other residences along North Drake Street sustained EF1 damage, with another mobile home being destroyed. The tornado crossed the North Colgate Street/West Center Avenue intersection, destroying several mobile homes and single-family residences at EF2 strength, with numerous other structures sustaining EF1 damage. The Word of Life Church, located just north of the intersection along North Colgate Street, was damaged at EF1 strength, with wind speeds of 97 miles per hour (156 km/h) destroying portions of the building. The tornado continued southeast, crossing South Baylor Street and damaging structures at EF2 strength, with a mobile home on the west side of the street being completely leveled and a metal building along the east side collapsing.

=== Impacts in downtown Perryton ===
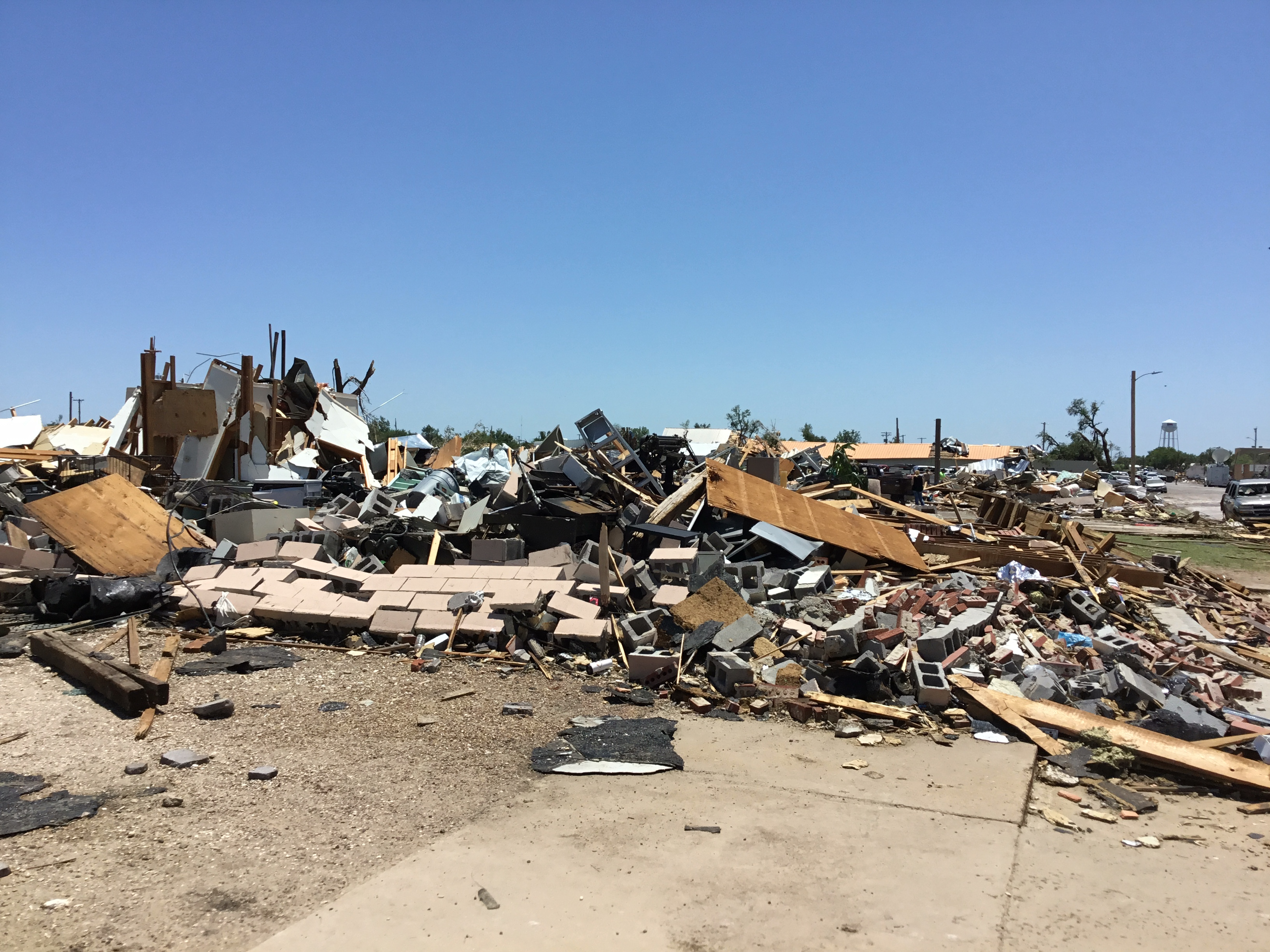
The Perryton Printing building after being destroyed at EF3 strength; Two people died at this location

The tornado tracked over West Santa Fe Avenue before intensifying to EF3 intensity and reaching a peak width of 0.50 mi (0.80 km) as it crossed near the SH 15/South Amherst Street intersection. The tornado began to enter the downtown area of Perryton, where it damaged several buildings at low-end EF3 strength, with several being completely destroyed. A lumber yard building along Southwest 2nd Avenue was destroyed at EF3 intensity with estimated wind speeds of 140 mph (230 km/h), with several exterior and interior walls collapsing. An automobile service building just south of the lumber yard suffered EF2 damage, with the roof being torn away. As the tornado approached US 83 (South Main Street), a strip mall along the street was damaged at EF2 strength, with the north side of a gym building collapsing. A microwave tower just south of Southwest 3rd Avenue folded in half at EF2 strength. The tornado then crossed US 83, downing power poles and inflicting low-end EF3 damage to an office supply building, with several exterior and interior walls being damaged and portions of the roof collapsing. A second automobile service building along the South Main Street/Southeast 1st Avenue intersection had its roof torn off at EF1 intensity, and a bakery just north of the automobile service building sustained high-end EF2 damage. Additionally, a second strip mall was impacted, with portions sustaining EF2 damage and a newer bank building sustaining EF1 damage. The tornado then struck the Perryton Fire Department building, destroying the structure at EF2 strength of 121 mph (195 km/h), with the entire roof collapsing. As the tornado crossed the Southeast 2nd Avenue/South Ash Street intersection, the Perryton Printing building just north of the intersection was completely destroyed at low-end EF3 intensity, with a few interior walls still standing. Two women who were having a garage sale at this location were killed. A second restaurant near the Southeast Third Avenue/South Ash Street intersection suffered EF1 damage, with numerous windows shattering. The tornado then struck a storage building along Southeast 2nd Avenue, completely destroying the structure at low-end EF3 strength. The Bethel Holiness Church along Southeast 3rd Avenue suffered EF2 damage, with portions of the roof collapsing.

=== Weakening and eventual dissipation ===
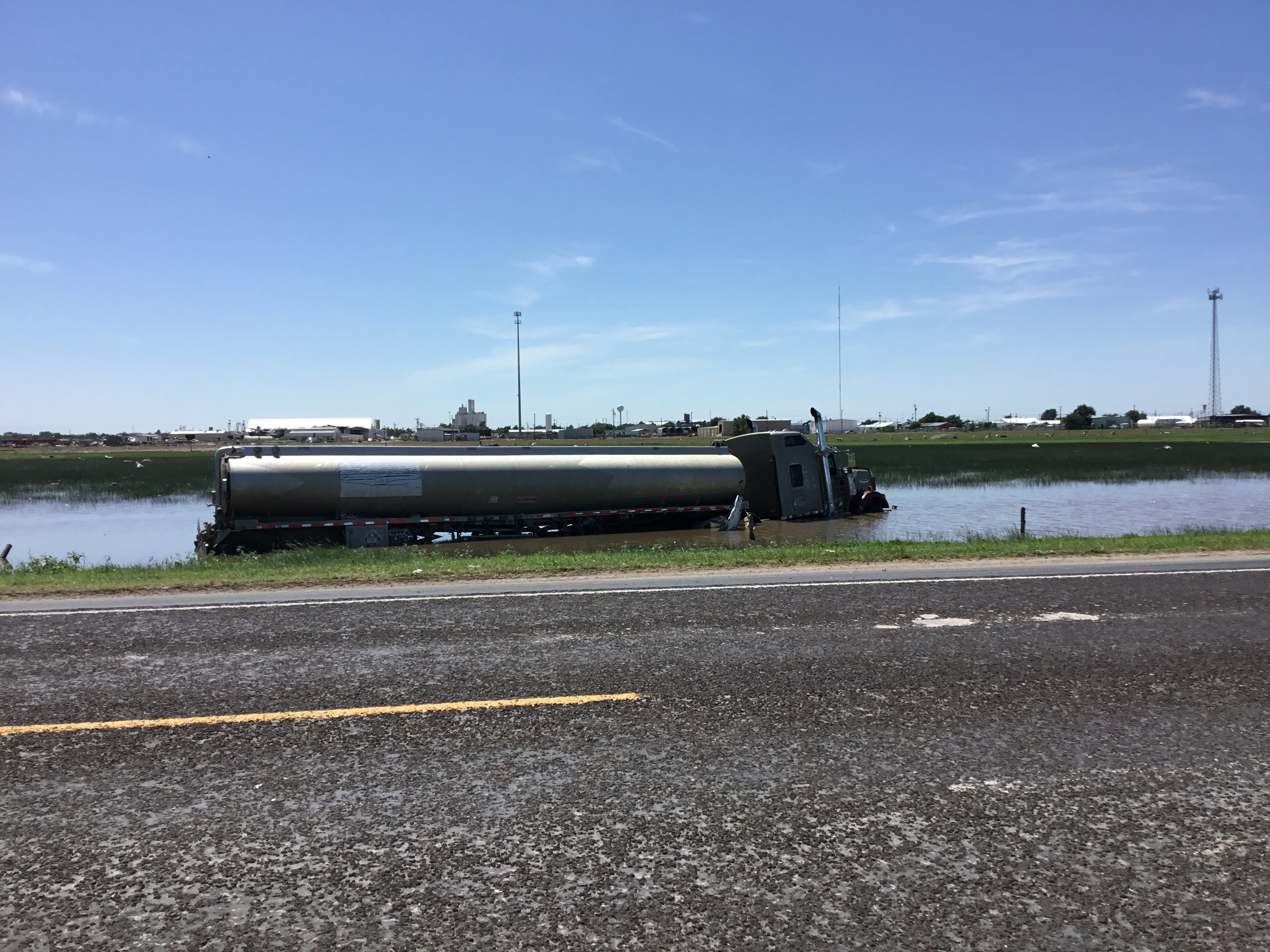
A semi-truck tanker that was blown off the road into a pond

The tornado weakened to EF2 strength as it crossed South Birch Street, damaging numerous homes in the area. A cell phone tower collapsed at high-end EF2 strength, and a house along the street suffered severe damage, with other residences having significant damage to their roofs. Branches of hardwood trees were snapped. The tornado continued to damage houses at EF2 intensity while tracking over South Cedar Street, completely destroying several mobile homes. The tornado then traversed Murphy Park, with debris from buildings within the downtown area being dispersed throughout the green space. The tornado then crossed South Elm Street, destroying several houses at EF2 strength. The tornado tracked eastward, destroying several residences along Southeast 4th Avenue at EF1 intensity, with a mobile home being destroyed and the roof of a single-family residence being torn away. The tornado then crossed South Industrial Highway and South Juniper Street before turning southeastward and impacting an industrial park area at EF2 strength, partially destroying several metal buildings, tossing several empty fuel tanks, each weighing around 10,000 lb (4,500 kg), 60–70 yards (55–64 m) across Loop 143 and into a nearby field, and downing several power poles. An 85,000 lb (39,000 kg) semi-truck tanker was blown off Loop 143 and into a pond as the tornado tracked across the road. The tornado then entered more rural areas before crossing Highway 377, snapping around 10 power poles, tossing seven fuel tanks into a nearby pond, and damaging a grain bin, with additional farm equipment suffering damage. The tornado crossed just south of the Highway 377/County Road 18 intersection and tracked over an open field for a few miles before dissipating just northwest of County Road 20 at 5:17 p.m.

=== Other tornadoes ===
Several landspouts formed south of Perryton along the flanking line of the supercell that produced the Perryton tornado, with two growing into strong and long-lived tornadoes. The northern twin tornado touched down at 5:02 p.m. and tracked 17.35 miles (27.92 km) and reached a maximum width of 200 yards (180 m). Several power lines were snapped at EF2 strength with estimated wind speeds of 115 mph (185 km/h). The tornado crossed US 83 before dissipating at 5:35 p.m., after being on the ground for 33 minutes.

The southern tornado touched down at 5:12 p.m., tracking 12.26 miles (19.73 km) and reaching a max width of 50 yards (46 m). The tornado inflicted EF0 damage of 80 mph (129 km/h) to vegetation before crossing US 83 and County Road West and dissipating at 5:30 p.m. after being on the ground for 18 minutes. Both tornadoes were documented by several storm chasers.

== Aftermath ==
=== Damage ===
Widespread damage to homes within Perryton

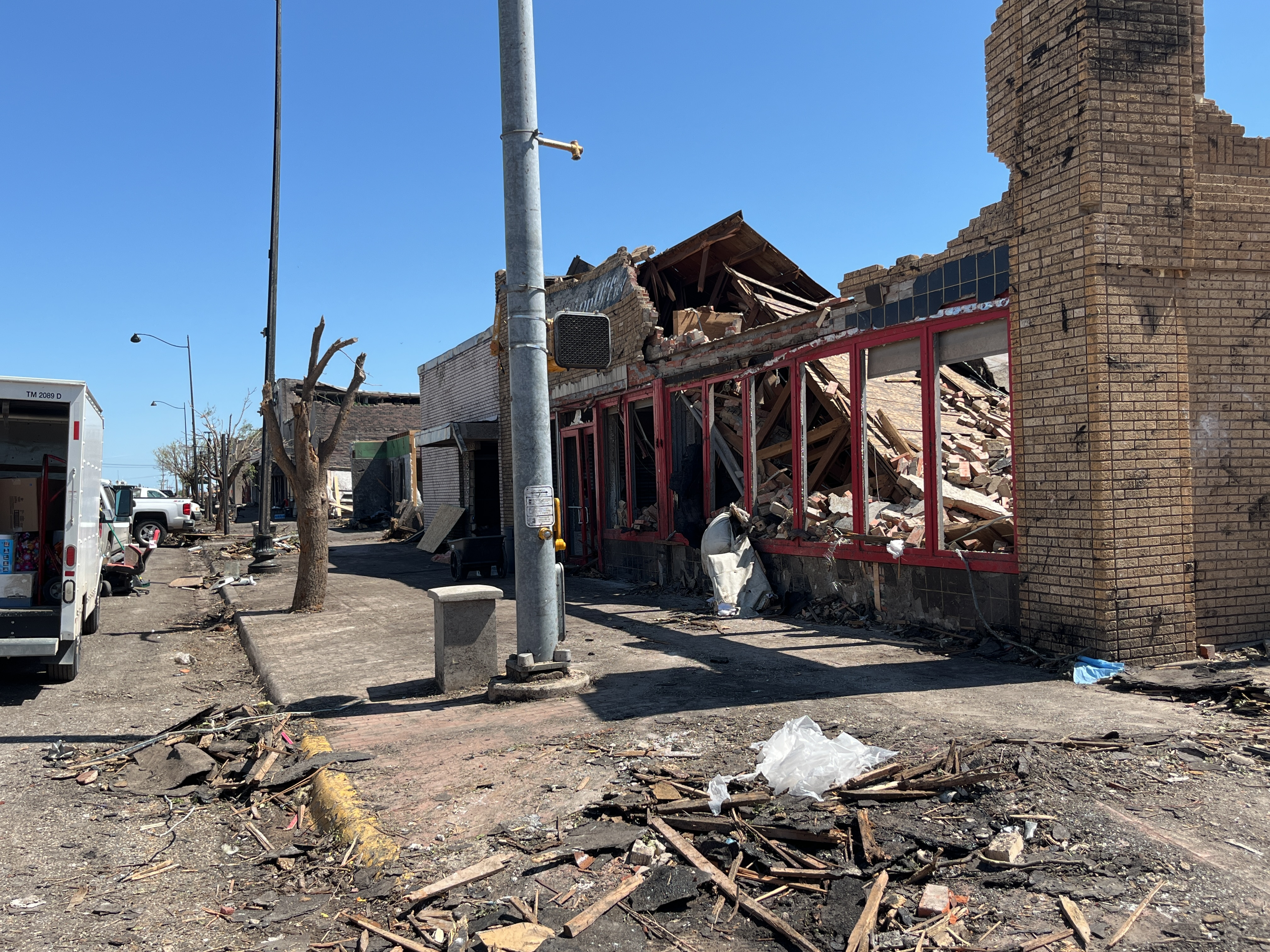
Low-end EF3 damage to the Perryton Office Supply building

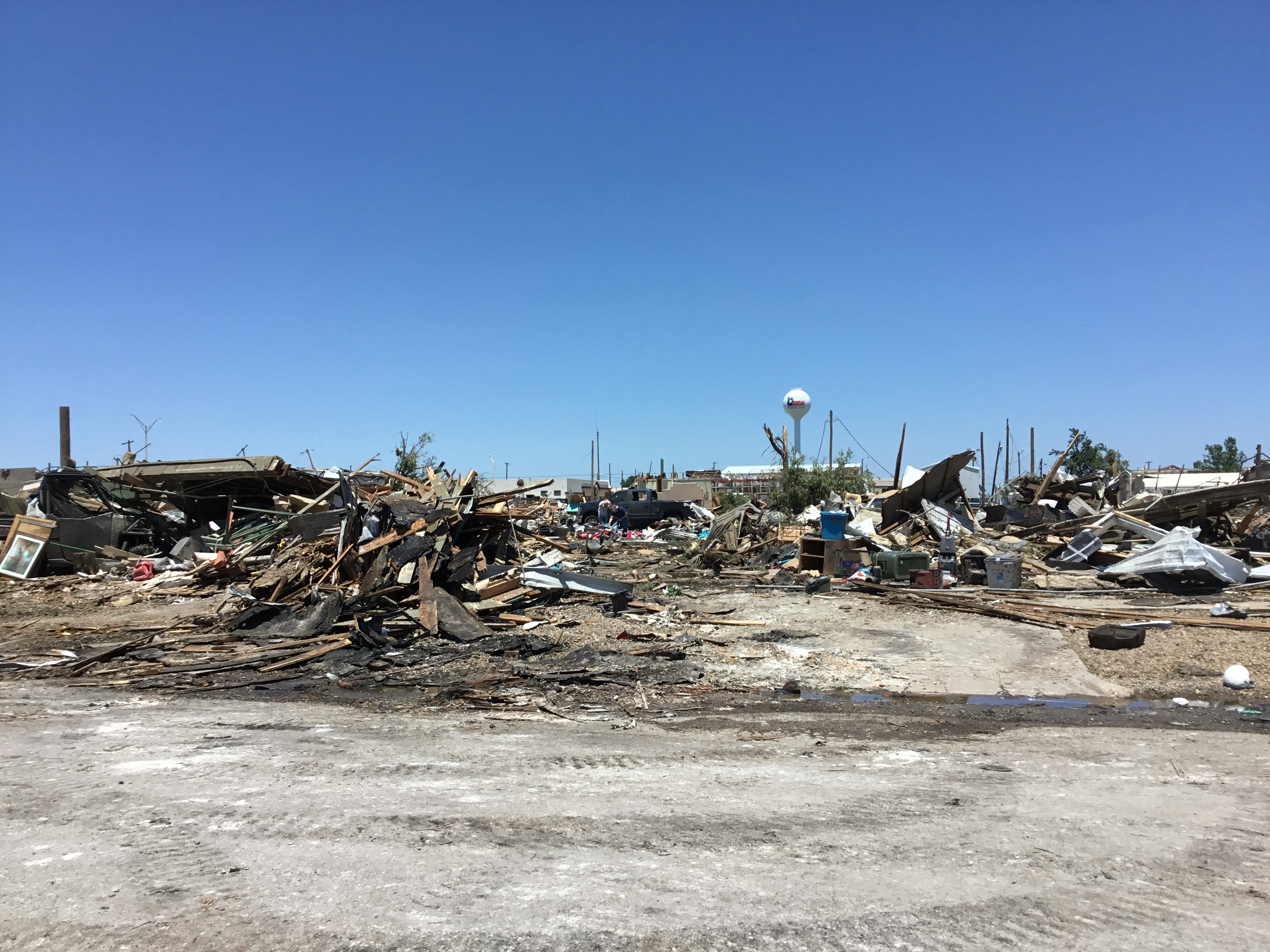
A storage building that was completely destroyed

The damage within Perryton following the tornado was significant, with around 200 homes being destroyed, including dozens of mobile homes. A fire started in the mobile home park. Numerous retail buildings in the downtown area of the city sustained damage, with several being destroyed at EF3 strength. Around 96 businesses were impacted by the tornado. The Perryton Office Supply building, Ochiltree County Farm Bureau office, a floral shop, a hair salon, a tire shop, and an auto repair shop were among the businesses that were destroyed. A minivan was displaced and shoved into a wall of a theater. The entire city suffered from a power outage following the tornado, as numerous power poles were destroyed. Around 4,500 customers were affected, and the blackout led to the tornado sirens within the city not activating. Additionally, the city suffered from a natural gas outage.

The Perryton Fire Department building sustained severe damage, with several ambulances and fire trucks being damaged and the roof being destroyed. One ambulance had its windshield shattered and the top of the cab crushed. Despite the damage sustained, the department stated that all the vehicles were drivable. A cell phone tower was downed, which led to communication outages within the city. The Word of Life Church within the city was destroyed, and the Bethel Holiness Church also sustained severe damage. Murphy Park was littered with debris from the tornado. Numerous vehicles were rolled and damaged by the tornado. Damage from the tornado totaled to $1 million (2023 USD).

=== Recovery ===
Nearly 4,500 Xcel Energy customers were without power following the tornado. Four days later, only 450 customers were still left without electricity. A citywide curfew from 12:00 a.m. to 6:00 a.m. was put in place. Texas A&M Task Force 1 and Task Force 2 were sent to the area to assist in search and rescue operations. The day following the tornado, Beaver County, Oklahoma and the city of Stinnett, Texas sent police and EMS units to Perryton to assist in rescue operations. Additionally, the Borger Police Department, Booker Fire Department, and Fritch, Texas city officials aided in tornado damage recovery. One person that went missing after the tornado was found. Xcel Energy crews assisted in clearing power lines from on top of cars and on roads. Texas Governor Greg Abbott issued a disaster declaration for the counties of Ochiltree, Cass, Franklin, Harrison, Marion, Upshur, and Wood, all of which were impacted by the severe weather, and the Texas Division of Emergency Management (TDEM) mobilized resources to Perryton.

Texas Game Wardens provided law enforcement services for the city, and the Austin Fire Department sent eight of its members to assist in recovery efforts. An American Red Cross shelter was established at the Perryton High School, where those who were impacted could receive mental health help, medical assistance, shelter, and meals. Additionally, washing stations and pet stations were established. The Global Empowerment Mission provided 26 pallets of kits filled with essentials, and the Perryton National Bank established a relief fund, with all proceeds being donated to impacted families. Samaritan's Purse sent a semi-truck full of goods to the city, and 49 volunteers from the organization assisted in clearing debris, finding lost items, and tarping damaged roofs. The Convoy of Hope donated 110,000 pounds worth of supplies to over 5,700 individuals within Perryton. The Salvation Army distributed meals to those in the city and offered prayer services. Members of the Texas Baptist Men's Relief used three skidsteers to clear debris and had two teams assisting with cleanup. The city received so many material donations that it overwhelmed local resources, leading to officials asking for only monetary donations until further notice.

On June 17, Greg Abbott visited Perryton, touring the damage and holding a conference to discuss the state's response. On August 23, Abbott's request for a disaster declaration within Ochitree and neighboring counties to the Small Business Administration was accepted, allowing affected communities to receive the funds needed for repair and recovery. Over $2 million in donations were provided to Perryton.

A year after the tornado, Perryton received a $2.7 million grant to support small businesses and the city's economy from the Economic Development Administration. The city worked with the Texas Parks and Wildlife Department to clear Murphy Park of debris. Perryton Home Design operated out of a temporary location for two months before moving to a new building. In the two years following the tornado, damaged and destroyed buildings were demolished, with new ones being built. Many new homes were also constructed. The city spent $3 million on recovery, purchasing compactors and other equipment while funding new construction. Around 20 impacted businesses did not reopen following the tornado, with new businesses opening along Main Street. The population of the city initially decreased after the tornado, but many former residents eventually returned.

=== Casualties ===
The tornado killed three people and injured over 100 others within Perryton. The first fatality occurred in a trailer park within the northwest part of the city, where an 11-year-old boy was thrown around 150 yards (140 m) from his mobile home. The two other fatalities occurred in the Perryton Printing building within the downtown area, where two women were having a garage sale. The building was completely destroyed at EF3 intensity, with both individuals dying. The Ochiltree General Hospital within Perryton treated 115 people following the storm, with injuries ranging from minor to broken bones, head trauma, and collapsed lungs.

The tornado was first fatal tornado in Perryton since an F1 tornado killed one person on June 6, 1987, and the first tornado to strike the city since an EF0 damaged some buildings on May 26, 2021. The tornado is the most recent and deadliest of the three fatal tornadoes in the city's history.

== See also ==
- Weather of 2023
- Tornado outbreak sequence of June 14–19, 2023
- 2023 Matador tornado – another deadly EF3 tornado that occurred six days later
