= Florida Central Railroad (1907–1914) =

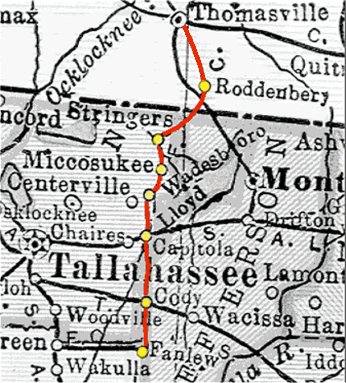
Florida Central Railroad.

The Florida Central Railroad, headquartered in Thomasville, Georgia, constructed a 47-mile (76 km) line between that city and Fanlew, Florida in 1907 and 1908.

The first 10 miles (16 km) ran from Thomasville to the lumber mill in Metcalf, Georgia, then on to Roddenberry. The Florida Central ran parallel to part of an Atlantic Coast Line Railroad line, crossing the ACL near the Florida/Georgia border and then running south to Stringers in extreme northeastern Leon County. From there the FC ran to Miccosukee and Wadesboro in Leon County, then to Capitola in Leon County (where it crossed the Seaboard Air Line Railroad), Cody in Jefferson County, terminating at Fanlew. The line planned to build west to Vereen in Wakulla County, but did not complete the route.

In 1914, the Atlantic Coast Line purchased the Florida Central Railroad.
