= Beltrami, Minnesota =

City in Minnesota, United States

- City
- Location of Beltrami, Minnesota
- Coordinates: 47°32′33″N 96°31′37″W
- Country: United States
- State: Minnesota
- County: Polk
- Founded: 1883
- Incorporated: September 11, 1901

Government
  - Mayor: Dale Schoenborn

Area
  - Total: 1.999 sq mi (5.177 km^{2})
  - Land: 1.999 sq mi (5.177 km^{2})
  - Water: 0 sq mi (0.000 km^{2})
- Elevation: 906 ft (276 m)

Population (2020)
  - Total: 88
  - Estimate (2022): 86
  - Density: 44/sq mi (17/km^{2})
- Time zone: UTC−6 (Central (CST))
  - Summer (DST): UTC−5 (CDT)
- ZIP Code: 56517
- Area code: 218
- FIPS code: 27-05014
- GNIS feature ID: 2394126
- Sales tax: 7.375%

Beltrami is a city in Polk County, Minnesota, United States. It was named for Giacomo Beltrami (1779–1855), an Italian exile who traveled to the Red River and the upper Mississippi in 1823. The city was incorporated in 1901, but there had been settlers in the area since 1870. It is part of the Grand Forks, ND-MN Metropolitan Statistical Area. The population was 88 at the 2020 census.

== Geography ==
According to the United States Census Bureau, the city has an area of 1.999 square miles (5.18 km^{2}), all land.

Minnesota State Highway 9 and Polk County Highway 1 are two of the main routes in the community.

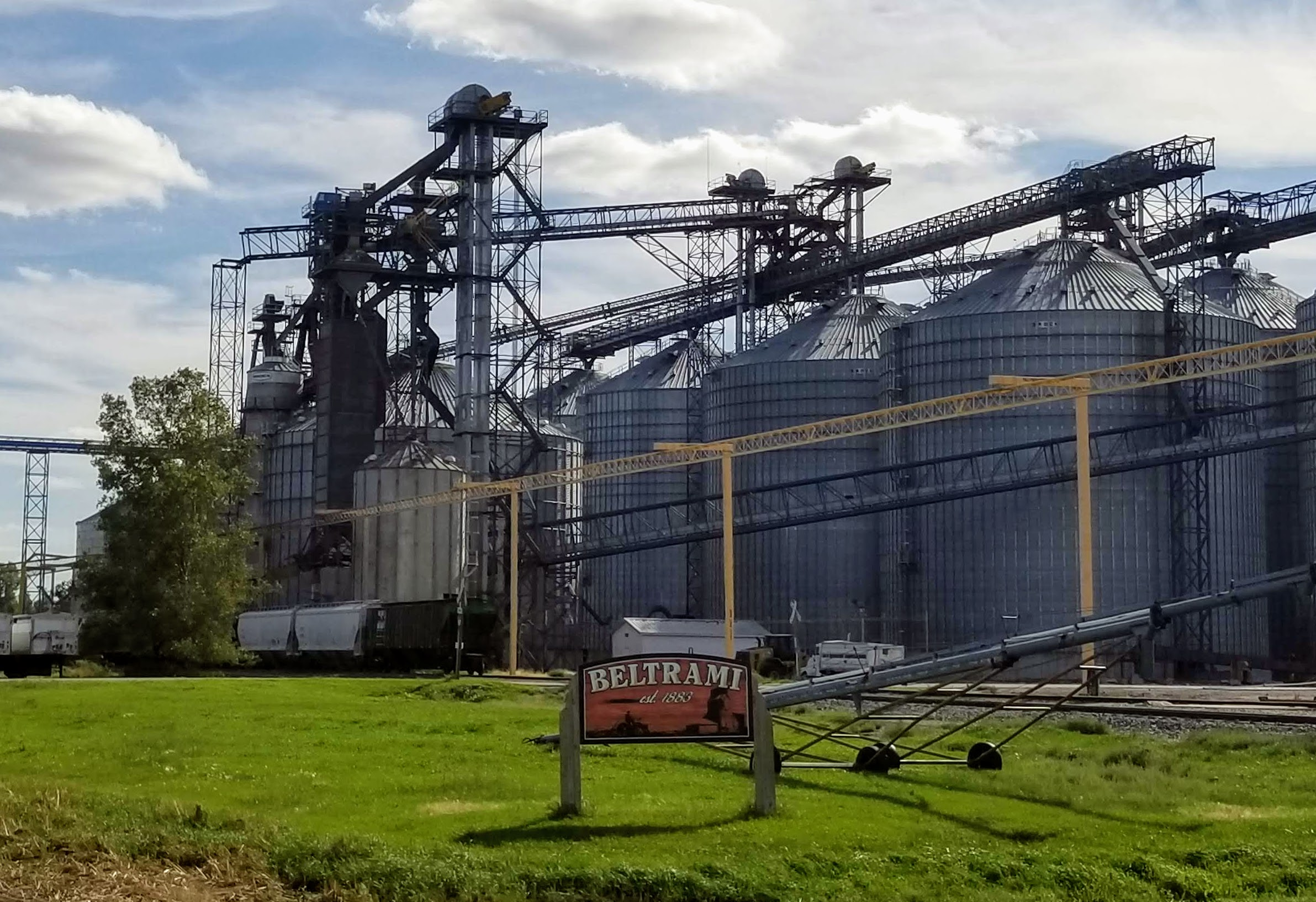
Sign welcoming visitors to Beltrami.

== Demographics ==
Historical population
Census	Pop.	Note	%±
1910	149		—
1920	219		47.0%
1930	226		3.2%
1940	213		−5.8%
1950	199		−6.6%
1960	186		−6.5%
1970	171		−8.1%
1980	134		−21.6%
1990	133		−0.7%
2000	101		−24.1%
2010	107		5.9%
2020	88		−17.8%
2022 (est.)	86		−2.3%
U.S. Decennial Census; 2020 Census

=== 2010 census ===
As of the 2010 census, there were 107 people, 42 households, and 32 families living in the city. The population density was 53.5 inhabitants per square mile (20.7/km^{2}). There were 45 housing units at an average density of 22.5 per square mile (8.7/km^{2}). The racial makeup of the city was 100.0% White.

There were 42 households, of which 28.6% had children under the age of 18 living with them, 61.9% were married couples living together, 9.5% had a female householder with no husband present, 4.8% had a male householder with no wife present, and 23.8% were non-families. 16.7% of all households were made up of individuals, and 4.8% had someone living alone who was 65 years of age or older. The average household size was 2.55 and the average family size was 2.84.

The median age in the city was 47.1 years. 24.3% of residents were under the age of 18; 5.6% were between the ages of 18 and 24; 15% were from 25 to 44; 34.5% were from 45 to 64; and 20.6% were 65 years of age or older. The gender makeup of the city was 46.7% male and 53.3% female.

=== 2000 census ===
As of the 2000 census, there were 101 people, 44 households, and 31 families living in the city. The population density was 50.2 inhabitants per square mile (19.4/km^{2}). There were 48 housing units at an average density of 23.9 per square mile (9.2/km^{2}). The racial makeup of the city was 97.03% White, and 2.97% from two or more races.

There were 44 households, out of which 34.1% had children under the age of 18 living with them, 59.1% were married couples living together, 6.8% had a female householder with no husband present, and 29.5% were non-families. 27.3% of all households were made up of individuals, and 13.6% had someone living alone who was 65 years of age or older. The average household size was 2.30 and the average family size was 2.74.

In the city, the population was spread out, with 24.8% under the age of 18, 3.0% from 18 to 24, 25.7% from 25 to 44, 23.8% from 45 to 64, and 22.8% who were 65 years of age or older. The median age was 44 years. For every 100 females, there were 98.0 males. For every 100 females age 18 and over, there were 85.4 males.

The median income for a household in the city was $30,833, and the median income for a family was $31,250. Males had a median income of $31,250 versus $13,750 for females. The per capita income for the city was $14,928. There were 6.7% of families and 10.2% of the population living below the poverty line, including 15.0% of under eighteens and 8.3% of those over 64.
