= Pachitla, Georgia =

Unincorporated community in Georgia, U.S.

Coordinates: 31°45′47″N 84°40′53″W

Pachitla is an unincorporated community in Randolph County, in the U.S. state of Georgia.

== History ==
Pachitla is a name derived from a Native American language meaning either "dead pigeon", "pigeon town" or "opossum".
