= Nicholasville, Georgia =

Unincorporated community in Georgia, United States

Nicholasville
- Unincorporated community
- Location within Georgia
- Coordinates: 33.868167°N 83.754619°W
- List of sovereign states: United States of America
- State: Georgia
- County: Walton
- Elevation: 919 ft (280 m)

Nicholasville is an unincorporated community in Walton County, in the U.S. state of Georgia.

== History ==
A variant name was "Nickelville". According to tradition, the community was first called "Nickelville" because whiskey drinks were sold at the local country store for just one nickel.
