= Tornado outbreak sequence of June 20–26, 2023 =

Weather event in the United States and Canada

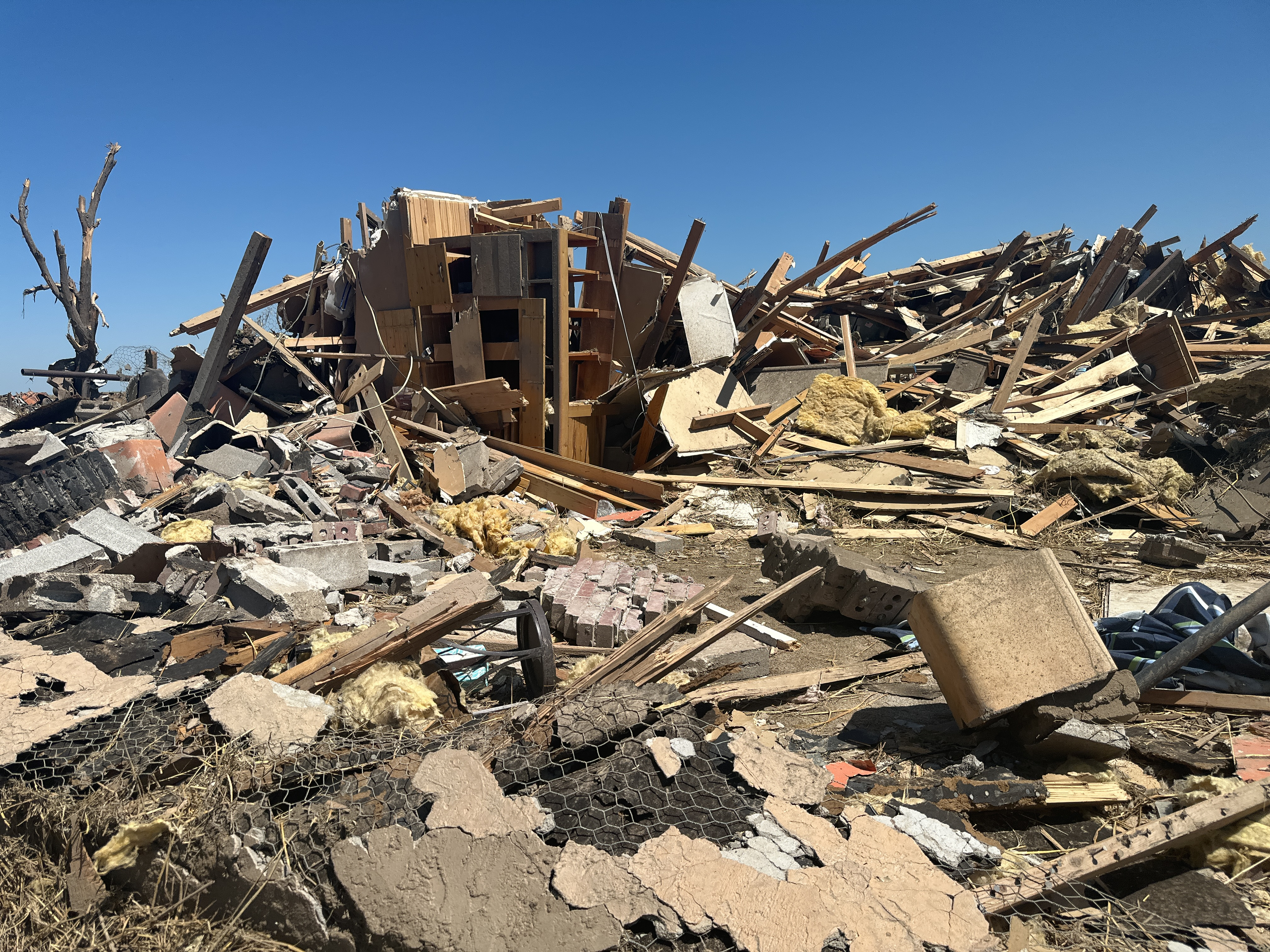
- A house that was completely destroyed by an EF3 tornado south of Granada, Colorado on June 23.

Tornado outbreak
- Tornadoes: 115
- Max. rating: EF3 tornado
- Duration: June 20–26, 2023
- Highest winds: 165 mph (266 km/h) (Matador, Texas EF3 on June 21); 125 mph (201 km/h) near Selfridge, North Dakota (downburst June 21)
- Largest hail: 4.5 in (11 cm) near Matador, Texas, on June 21 and near Lubbock, Texas, on June 23

Overall effects
- Fatalities: 5 fatalities (+5 non-tornadic)
- Injuries: >126 injuries
- Damage: $5.0 billion (2023 USD)
- Areas affected: Great Plains, Midwestern, Eastern United States, Manitoba, Ontario
- Power outages: 700,000
- Part of the tornado outbreaks of 2023

From June 20–26, 2023, a sequence of multiple severe weather events and tornado outbreaks began across large portions of the Great Plains, Midwestern, and Eastern United States as well as Manitoba and Ontario in Canada. This included a historic outbreak of 37 tornadoes in Colorado on June 21. A slow moving trough interacted with extremely high moisture and atmospheric instability to produce favorable conditions for supercells. Large hail and damaging winds accompanied a multi-day tornado risk which produced multiple strong tornadoes, including a destructive high-end EF3 tornado that killed 4 people in Matador, Texas on June 21, and another EF3 tornado south of Granada, Colorado on June 23. Multiple EF2 tornadoes touched down from Indiana to Kentucky on June 25. Reports of power outages, wind damage, hail damage, and tornadic damage accumulated across the affected region. In all, five people died from tornadoes, and three other non-tornadic deaths also occurred. Over 120 people were injured as well.

== Meteorological synopsis ==
On the heels of another tornado outbreak sequence, a new outbreak sequence began on June 20 with a few weak tornadoes in North Dakota and Manitoba. On June 21, strong southwesterly winds associated with a large upper-level trough over the Western United States began overspreading central portions of the country. The Storm Prediction Center (SPC) issued a bimodal level 3/Enhanced risk, one encompassing the tri-state region of Wyoming, Colorado, and Nebraska, and the second stretching from the Texas/Oklahoma panhandles into North Texas. To the south, an extraordinarily moist environment with dewpoints in the mid-70s °F over the spread area. High moisture combined with daytime heating resulted in an unstable airmass characterized by mixed-layer convective available potential energy (CAPE) in excess of 4,500 J/kg. Favorable wind shear overspread this environment, while the combination of outflow from morning storms and a nearby dry line became the focal point for thunderstorm development. A broken line of supercells developed from Kansas southward into Texas, contributing to large hail, damaging winds, and a few tornadoes. An especially intense tornado moved through western sections of Matador, Texas, killing four people and causing major damage. To the north across Colorado, Wyoming, and Nebraska, storms similarly developed along remnant outflow. Although low-level shear was weak, this outflow enhanced shear in the immediate vicinity of storms, resulting in numerous tornadoes that over largely open country. A total of 37 tornadoes touched down in Colorado that day, 27 of which were spawned by a single slow-moving supercell near Akron. A less active day occurred on June 22, although sporadic severe weather occurred across the Southern Plains, including a few brief tornado touchdowns in Colorado and Wyoming. This included a rain-wrapped EF1 tornado that moved through the Denver suburb of Highlands Ranch.

On June 23, the focal point for active weather shifted northward into eastern Wyoming and The Dakotas, where the SPC outlined a level 3/Enhanced risk. Stronger wind shear associated with an approaching shortwave trough overspread an unstable airmass with mixed-layer CAPE upwards of 2,500 J/kg. Through the afternoon, convection developed along the Laramie and Bighorn mountains, and along a warm front/outflow boundary across Wyoming and Nebraska. A few supercells evolved in this region, particularly later into the afternoon as low-level shear increased, producing large hail and numerous tornadoes, some of which were strong. This included an EF2 tornado that injured eight workers at the North Antelope Rochelle Mine in Campbell County, Wyoming. With time, outflow from ongoing convection merged, leading to a line of storms that pushed eastward. Farther south in southeastern Colorado and western Kansas, more isolated but significant supercells developed along a dryline and in an area of strong orographic lift. These highly structured cells moved east in a favorable environment, producing large hail and long-lived tornadoes, including an EF3 tornado that completely destroyed a farmstead near Granada, Colorado. On June 24, the risk area shifted deeper into the Midwestern United States. A low-pressure area tracked across southeastern North Dakota during the afternoon, supporting a warm front across northern Minnesota. Modest CAPE of 1,500 J/kg combined with strong shear along the boundary fostered low-topped convection and multiple tornadoes, including a strong EF2 tornado near Mahnomen, Minnesota. To the south, combined clusters of convection produced sporadic damaging winds across Iowa and Illinois.

An expansive level 3/Enhanced risk encompassed much of the Ohio River Valley and Mid-South on June 25. The greatest threat for potentially strong tornadoes was focused across Indiana, Ohio, and Kentucky. Here, the environment rapidly destabilized amid daytime heating, CAPE upwards of 2,000 J/kg, and the approach of an upper-level trough. An arcing band of supercells quickly developed by midday along a pseudo-dryline feature, producing very large hail and multiple strong tornadoes. To the north across Michigan, a line of convection in a more marginal environment produced sporadic damaging winds. Across the Southeastern United States, a moist and unstable environment devoid of strong low-level shear aided a long-lived mesoscale convective system that produced widespread damaging winds as well. Multiple rounds of linear convection contributed to additional severe reports through the evening. The threat for severe weather shifted eastward into the Mid-Atlantic on June 26, where the SPC issued a broad level 3/Enhanced risk stretching from The Carolinas into Pennsylvania and New Jersey. An area of low pressure moved across Michigan and supported a cold front across the Ohio River Valley. To the east, a pre-frontal trough also developed along the Blue Ridge Mountains. Mixed-layer CAPE of 1,000-2,500 J/kg and dewpoints in excess of 65 °F (18 °C) across a wide region were forecast to materialize. However, diurnal heating was at least somewhat hampered by multiple rounds of convection and widespread cloudiness through the morning hours. Clusters of storms developed throughout the region ahead of the cold front, contributing to numerous instances of damaging winds and a few tornadoes as far north as Ontario until they began to weaken with the loss of daytime heating or pushed offshore beyond the coastline.

== Confirmed tornadoes ==
Confirmed tornadoes by Enhanced Fujita rating
EFU	EF0	EF1	EF2	EF3	EF4	EF5	Total
61	19	22	11	2	0	0	115

=== June 20 event ===
List of confirmed tornadoes – Tuesday, June 20, 2023 (Note: All dates are based on the local time zone where the tornado touched down; however, all times are in Coordinated Universal Time for consistency.)
EF#	Location	County / Parish	State	Start Coord.	Time (UTC)	Path length	Max width
EF2	ESE of Bayou Gauche	St. Charles	LA	29.76°N 90.28°W	21:00–21:07	6.10 km (3.79 mi)	370 m (400 yd)
EF2	A strong tornado was discovered via high-resolution satellite imagery. Beginning as a waterspout over Salvador Lake, the tornado moved northwest into the Salvador Wildlife Management Area. Widespread trees were uprooted and snapped with ground scouring being noted as well. The tornado proceeded to gradually weaken and dissipate over marshland. This tornado was upgraded from EF1 to EF2 after reanalysis in 2025.						
EF1	NNE of Carpenter, ND) to W of Lena, MB	Rolette (ND), Boissevain-Morton (MB)	ND, MB	48.9983°N 99.9603°W	02:35–?	≥4.0 mi (6.5 km)	≥230 yd (210 m)
EF1	Aerial surveys revealed a tornado touched down just south of the Canada–United States border and moved northeast into Canada. Damage was confined to numerous trees that were snapped or uprooted within William Lake Provincial Park. Only the Canadian portion of the track was surveyed.						
EF1	NW of Killarney to SE of Ninette	Killarney-Turtle Mountain, Prairie Lakes	MB	49.2331°N 99.748°W	02:55–?	10.9 mi (17.5 km)	1,300 yd (1,200 m)
EF1	A large tornado snapped trees and caused roof and siding damage to a couple of homes, one of which was shifted slightly off its foundation. A camper was tipped over, a Quonset hut was destroyed, and several grain bins and barns were destroyed as well.						
EF1	NE of MacGregor	North Norfolk	MB	49.9906°N 98.6987°W	04:30–?	4.3 mi (7 km)	870 yd (800 m)
EF1	Trees were snapped and several grain bins and farm outbuildings were damaged. A farmhouse had minor damage, and some metal storage tanks were dented.						

=== June 21 event ===
List of confirmed tornadoes – Wednesday, June 21, 2023
EF#	Location	County / Parish	State	Start Coord.	Time (UTC)	Path length	Max width
EFU	ENE of Lorenzo	Cheyenne	NE	41.0583°N 103.0234°W	19:33	0.59 mi (0.95 km)	50 yd (46 m)
EFU	A local emergency manager observed a brief tornado. No damage occurred.						
EFU	N of Sterling	Logan	CO	40.7109°N 103.1988°W	19:44–19:47	0.46 mi (0.74 km)	25 yd (23 m)
EFU	A storm chaser observed a tornado that caused no damage.						
EFU	SE of Akron	Washington	CO	40.0657°N 102.9894°W	21:05–21:10	0.66 mi (1.06 km)	25 yd (23 m)
EFU	This tornado touched down and remained in an open field.						
EFU	NW of Sterling	Logan	CO	40.0657°N 102.9894°W	21:35–21:46	1.44 mi (2.32 km)	25 yd (23 m)
EFU	Trained storm spotters observed a tornado over open country. No damage occurred.						
EFU	S of Akron (1st tornado)	Washington	CO	39.9991°N 103.1896°W	22:10–22:11	0.3 mi (0.48 km)	25 yd (23 m)
EFU	A storm chaser observed a brief rope tornado that moved over open fields and caused no damage.						
EFU	S of Akron (2nd tornado)	Washington	CO	40.0185°N 103.194°W	22:18–22:22	0.51 mi (0.82 km)	25 yd (23 m)
EFU	This cone tornado caused no damage.						
EFU	S of Akron (3rd tornado)	Washington	CO	40.0171°N 103.1855°W	22:25–22:26	0.69 mi (1.11 km)	50 yd (46 m)
EFU	Storm chasers observed a tornado that remained over open country and caused no damage.						
EFU	S of Akron (4th tornado)	Washington	CO	40.02°N 103.1971°W	22:28–22:29	0.24 mi (0.39 km)	50 yd (46 m)
EFU	A brief tornado touched down in an open field and caused no damage.						
EF2	S of Akron (5th tornado)	Washington	CO	40.0216°N 103.202°W	22:28–22:35	1.85 mi (2.98 km)	400 yd (370 m)
EF2	This strong tornado snapped multiple power poles along SH 63.						
EFU	S of Akron (6th tornado)	Washington	CO	40.02°N 103.196°W	22:29–22:30	0.2 mi (0.32 km)	25 yd (23 m)
EFU	A storm chaser reported a brief satellite tornado in association with the 2228 UTC tornado. No damage occurred.						
EFU	S of Akron (7th tornado)	Washington	CO	40.0205°N 103.1888°W	22:31–22:34	1.6 mi (2.6 km)	50 yd (46 m)
EFU	This tornado was a satellite tornado to the 2228 UTC tornado and caused no damage.						
EFU	S of Akron (8th tornado)	Washington	CO	40.0292°N 103.2389°W	22:36–22:37	0.57 mi (0.92 km)	50 yd (46 m)
EFU	A brief tornado occurred over open country.						
EFU	S of Akron (9th tornado)	Washington	CO	40.0328°N 103.2387°W	22:37–22:38	1.03 mi (1.66 km)	200 yd (180 m)
EFU	This tornado tracked through over open country, causing no damage.						
EFU	S of Akron (10th tornado)	Washington	CO	40.0329°N 103.2183°W	22:39–22:40	0.47 mi (0.76 km)	25 yd (23 m)
EFU	A storm chaser observed a brief tornado that remained over open fields and inflicted no damage.						
EFU	S of Akron (11th tornado)	Washington	CO	40.0363°N 103.2269°W	22:40–22:41	0.57 mi (0.92 km)	25 yd (23 m)
EFU	This tornado occurred over open country, causing no damage.						
EFU	S of Akron (12th tornado)	Washington	CO	40.0397°N 103.2202°W	22:42–22:43	0.28 mi (0.45 km)	25 yd (23 m)
EFU	A storm chaser documented a tornado. No damage occurred.						
EF1	S of Akron (13th tornado)	Washington	CO	40.0422°N 103.2456°W	22:43–22:45	0.95 mi (1.53 km)	200 yd (180 m)
EF1	A farmstead was slightly damaged.						
EFU	S of Akron (14th tornado)	Washington	CO	40.0397°N 103.2202°W	22:43–22:45	0.28 mi (0.45 km)	25 yd (23 m)
EFU	This tornado remained over open country.						
EFU	S of Akron (15th tornado)	Washington	CO	40.047°N 103.2249°W	22:45–22:46	0.36 mi (0.58 km)	50 yd (46 m)
EFU	The first of two simultaneous tornadoes caused no damage over open fields.						
EFU	S of Akron (16th tornado)	Washington	CO	40.047°N 103.24°W	22:45–22:46	0.76 mi (1.22 km)	25 yd (23 m)
EFU	The second of two simultaneous tornadoes inflicted no damage.						
EFU	S of Akron (17th tornado)	Washington	CO	40.0484°N 103.2352°W	22:46–22:47	0.91 mi (1.46 km)	25 yd (23 m)
EFU	This tornado was documented by a storm chaser as it remained over open fields.						
EFU	S of Akron (18th tornado)	Washington	CO	40.05°N 103.2369°W	22:47–22:48	0.42 mi (0.68 km)	50 yd (46 m)
EFU	No damage occurred as this tornado remained over rural land.						
EFU	S of Akron (19th tornado)	Washington	CO	40.0531°N 103.2361°W	22:48–22:49	0.54 mi (0.87 km)	100 yd (91 m)
EFU	This tornado occurred entirely over an open field. No damage was noted.						
EFU	S of Akron (20th tornado)	Washington	CO	40.055°N 103.245°W	22:49–22:50	0.6 mi (0.97 km)	25 yd (23 m)
EFU	A brief tornado inflicted no damage.						
EFU	S of Akron (21st tornado)	Washington	CO	40.058°N 103.249°W	22:50–22:51	0.76 mi (1.22 km)	25 yd (23 m)
EFU	A storm chaser observed a brief tornado that remained over open fields and caused no damage.						
EFU	S of Akron (22nd tornado)	Washington	CO	40.059°N 103.2519°W	22:51–22:52	1.25 mi (2.01 km)	25 yd (23 m)
EFU	This tornado remained over open fields.						
EFU	S of Akron (23rd tornado)	Washington	CO	40.0618°N 103.2617°W	22:52–22:55	1.93 mi (3.11 km)	200 yd (180 m)
EFU	This tornado was documented by a storm chaser as it occurred over open country, inflicting no damage.						
EFU	S of Akron (24th tornado)	Washington	CO	40.0618°N 103.2617°W	22:52–22:55	1.93 mi (3.11 km)	200 yd (180 m)
EFU	This tornado was a twin to the previous tornado. No damage occurred.						
EFU	S of Akron (25th tornado)	Washington	CO	40.061°N 103.265°W	22:53–22:56	0.55 mi (0.89 km)	25 yd (23 m)
EFU	A tornado remained over open land.						
EFU	S of Akron (26th tornado)	Washington	CO	40.0661°N 103.3313°W	22:57–23:10	4.33 mi (6.97 km)	50 yd (46 m)
EFU	This tornado caused no damage as it tracked through fields.						
EFU	S of Akron (27th tornado)	Washington	CO	40.075°N 103.2599°W	23:15–23:19	0.76 mi (1.22 km)	50 yd (46 m)
EFU	A storm chaser documented a brief cone tornado that remained over open fields, causing no damage.						
EFU	S of Claude	Armstrong	TX	34.95°N 101.38°W	23:18-23:23	0.89 mi (1.43 km)	100 yd (91 m)
EFU	A tornado occurred over an open field, causing no damage.						
EF2	S of Akron (28th tornado)	Washington	CO	40.0926°N 103.3588°W	23:20–23:36	4.52 mi (7.27 km)	400 yd (370 m)
EF2	This strong tornado destroyed multiple grain bins and a barn. Wooden power poles were snapped as well.						
EF1	NE of Willard	Logan	CO	40.5737°N 103.4509°W	23:30–23:40	0.08 mi (0.13 km)	14 yd (13 m)
EF1	A high-end EF1 tornado tore most of the roof off of a farmhouse and caused its chimney to collapse. Tree damage occurred, and an old barn was destroyed as well.						
EFU	E of Woodrow	Washington	CO	39.9866°N 103.4327°W	23:39–23:53	3.66 mi (5.89 km)	25 yd (23 m)
EFU	This tornado tracked through open country and inflicted no damage.						
EFU	N of Anton (1st tornado)	Washington	CO	39.8711°N 103.1946°W	00:14–00:15	0.79 mi (1.27 km)	50 yd (46 m)
EFU	An anticyclonic tornado caused no damage.						
EF2	N of Anton (2nd tornado)	Washington	CO	39.8654°N 103.2302°W	00:16–00:22	4.93 mi (7.93 km)	800 yd (730 m)
EF2	A strong, multiple-vortex tornado snapped 15 wooden power poles.						
EFU	N of Anton (3rd tornado)	Washington	CO	39.8321°N 103.2052°W	00:35–00:40	0.5 mi (0.80 km)	50 yd (46 m)
EFU	This tornado remained over open country.						
EFU	N of Anton (4th tornado)	Washington	CO	39.8321°N 103.2477°W	00:45–01:00	1.02 mi (1.64 km)	25 yd (23 m)
EFU	No damage occurred as this tornado tracked through open fields.						
EFU	NE of Whiteflat	Motley	TX	34.12°N 100.85°W	00:50–00:51	0.18 mi (0.29 km)	30 yd (27 m)
EFU	Storm chasers reported a brief tornado that remained over open country. No damage occurred.						
EF3	NE of Whiteflat to western Matador	Motley	TX	34.12°N 100.85°W	00:51–01:09	9.14 mi (14.71 km)	600 yd (550 m)
EF3	4 deaths – See section on this tornado – 15 people were injured.						
EF0	SE of Lemmon	Perkins	SD	45.8581°N 102.0424°W	01:19–01:21	1.76 mi (2.83 km)	50 yd (46 m)
EF0	A tornado touched down and moved across open fields. No damage was reported.						
EFU	NE of Afton	Dickens	TX	33.82°N 100.73°W	01:36–01:37	0.06 mi (0.097 km)	30 yd (27 m)
EFU	An off-duty NWS employee reported a brief tornado over open country that inflicted no damage.						
EFU	W of Matador	Motley	TX	34.01°N 100.89°W	01:37–01:40	2.82 mi (4.54 km)	100 yd (91 m)
EFU	This tornado occurred over open rangeland.						
EFU	SW of Yoder	Goshen	WY	41.886°N 104.344°W	01:44–01:46	1.01 mi (1.63 km)	50 yd (46 m)
EFU	A stovepipe tornado was observed. No damage was noted.						
EFU	E of Dickens	Dickens	TX	33.62°N 100.72°W	02:18–02:19	0.35 mi (0.56 km)	50 yd (46 m)
EFU	This tornado was observed by a storm chaser as it remained over an open field.						

=== June 22 event ===
List of confirmed tornadoes – Thursday, June 22, 2023
EF#	Location	County / Parish	State	Start Coord.	Time (UTC)	Path length	Max width
EF1	Northern Kinston	Lenoir	NC	35.285°N 77.586°W	17:04–17:05	0.7 mi (1.1 km)	100 yd (91 m)
EF1	This tornado touched down in the northern part of Kinston, where at least six large windows at a furniture store were bowed in or shattered, and a large AC unit on the top of the store was blown off. The exterior wall of a Salvation Army store was bowed out, a box truck parked nearby had a window blown out, and a dumpster was tossed about 100 yards (91 m). Some homes had minor damage to siding and shutters, a garden shed was blown off its foundation, and multiple trees were snapped. The tornado impacted UNC Health Care Lenoir, damaging an entrance sign and causing damage to a large section of a medical building's roof. A wooden power pole was snapped in half about 6 feet (1.8 m) off the ground, and power lines were downed as well.						
EF1	NNE of Briscoe to NE of Allison	Hemphill	TX	35.7°N 100.23°W	20:41–20:55	10.3 mi (16.6 km)	150 yd (140 m)
EF1	Many trees were snapped or uprooted and two silos had their lids torn off, causing one of them to collapse. Two sheds and a barn had minor roof damage.						
EF1	Highlands Ranch	Douglas	CO	39.5559°N 105.0159°W	21:24–21:48	6.3 mi (10.1 km)	25 yd (23 m)
EF1	A rain-wrapped tornado moved though Highlands Ranch, snapping or uprooting many trees and toppling fences. Several houses had roof and window damage, one of which had a section of its roof torn off. Northridge Elementary School sustained considerable roof damage, and a tree was blown over onto the building. Valor Christian High School had windows blown out and also sustained damage to its athletic fields.						
EFU	S of Chugwater	Laramie	WY	41.653°N 104.8794°W	22:42–22:45	3.12 mi (5.02 km)	50 yd (46 m)
EFU	This tornado briefly touched down over open country, causing no known damage.						
EF0	SSE of Peyton	El Paso	CO	38.95°N 104.42°W	02:08–02:10	0.85 mi (1.37 km)	10 yd (9.1 m)
EF0	A cone tornado caused minor damage to structures.						

=== June 23 event ===
List of confirmed tornadoes – Friday, June 23, 2023
EF#	Location	County / Parish	State	Start Coord.	Time (UTC)	Path length	Max width
EF0	N of Grace	Caribou	ID	42.6424°N 111.72°W	18:30–18:40	0.2 mi (0.32 km)	10 yd (9.1 m)
EF0	This tornado was photographed over an open field. No damage occurred.						
EF0	NE of Granger	Sweetwater	WY	41.6721°N 109.8193°W	19:35–19:37	1.55 mi (2.49 km)	30 yd (27 m)
EF0	A landspout was captured on video as it remained over open country.						
EF1	SSW of Midwest to ESE of Edgerton	Natrona	WY	43.2997°N 106.3486°W	20:15–20:35	10.83 mi (17.43 km)	100 yd (91 m)
EF1	This high-end EF1 cone tornado removed a large portion of the roof of a home. Along with the damage to the home, a trailer was overturned, fuel tanks were blown away, and trees near the home were damaged.						
EF0	N of Natrona	Natrona	WY	43.2326°N 106.82°W	20:37–20:40	2.21 mi (3.56 km)	30 yd (27 m)
EF0	This rope tornado was photographed as it remained over open country.						
EF0	N of Kaycee	Johnson	WY	43.7345°N 106.65°W	20:40–20:41	0.53 mi (0.85 km)	40 yd (37 m)
EF0	A brief tornado caused no damage.						
EFU	ESE of Ross	Converse	WY	43.43°N 105.84°W	22:33	0.25 mi (0.40 km)	50 yd (46 m)
EFU	This tornado occurred over open terrain. No known damage occurred.						
EFU	ENE of Chugwater (1st tornado)	Platte	WY	41.7745°N 104.7474°W	23:11	0.01 mi (0.016 km)	50 yd (46 m)
EFU	A very brief tornado inflicted no damage.						
EFU	ENE of Chugwater (2nd tornado)	Goshen	WY	41.794°N 104.646°W	23:29–23:37	3 mi (4.8 km)	50 yd (46 m)
EFU	Numerous photos and videos showed a cone tornado that remained over open country, causing no damage.						
EF3	SSW of Granada	Prowers	CO	37.89°N 102.38°W	23:40–00:22	13.12 mi (21.11 km)	320 yd (290 m)
EF3	This intense tornado remained mainly over open country, but caused major damage at a farmstead. A house on the property was completely destroyed and had only part of one interior wall still standing. Two barns were completely swept away with very little debris remaining, vehicles and pieces of farm machinery were thrown and destroyed, and trees were denuded and debarked. A metal-framed outbuilding was obliterated with only some mangled beams left behind, and a concrete footing was pulled out of the ground at that location. Eight cattle were killed at the farmstead. The tornado moved southeast from the farm, looped over its own path in an open field, and downed some wooden power poles before it dissipated. This was the strongest tornado to impact Colorado since an EF3 tornado that struck areas near Berthoud on June 4, 2015.						
EF2	SE of Wright	Campbell, Weston	WY	43.4986°N 105.3563°W	23:59–00:20	9.81 mi (15.79 km)	800 yd (730 m)
EF2	This strong tornado touched down near the Campbell/Converse County Line, initially snapping wooden power poles. It moved northeast and struck the North Antelope Rochelle Mine, the largest coal mine in the world. The operations area was directly impacted, where some metal buildings were damaged and cars, buses, and shipping containers were flipped or thrown. Twelve cars on an empty train were knocked over as well, and eight employees were injured. The tornado continued into Weston County, downing trees and partially unroofing a house before dissipating.						
EFU	W of Hawk Springs	Goshen	WY	41.7728°N 104.4151°W	00:03–00:04	0.5 mi (0.80 km)	50 yd (46 m)
EFU	Storm spotters documented a brief tornado that remained over open country.						
EF2	S of Hawk Springs	Goshen	WY	41.7762°N 104.2608°W	00:21–00:37	4.72 mi (7.60 km)	800 yd (730 m)
EF2	This strong tornado quickly became rain-wrapped after it touched down. An irrigation pivot was partially ripped from its concrete base, numerous power poles were snapped, and trees were snapped or uprooted. A small shed was swept away and destroyed, a barn was leveled, and a house had a tree branch impaled into its stucco siding. A railroad crossing sign was pulled out of the ground, and an 18-wheeler was flipped on US 85, injuring the driver.						
EF1	SE of Campo to W of Elkhart, KS	Baca	CO	37.03°N 102.33°W	00:33–00:56	8.43 mi (13.57 km)	100 yd (91 m)
EF1	A long-lived tornado remained mostly over open county, though two structures at an abandoned farmstead were damaged and some power poles were downed.						
EF1	E of Hawk Springs	Goshen	WY	41.78°N 104.14°W	00:44–00:58	3.9 mi (6.3 km)	20 yd (18 m)
EF1	An outbuilding collapsed and a few light poles and flag poles were bent.						
EFU	W of Gering	Scotts Bluff	NE	41.821°N 103.938°W	01:04–01:11	3.53 mi (5.68 km)	50 yd (46 m)
EFU	A tornado moved over open fields, causing no damage.						
EFU	W of Gering	Scotts Bluff	NE	41.85°N 103.85°W	01:22–01:27	3.16 mi (5.09 km)	50 yd (46 m)
EFU	This tornado tracked through open country. No known damage occurred.						
EFU	S of Holly	Prowers	CO	37.86°N 102.14°W	01:23	Unknown	Unknown
EFU	A tornado occurred over open country, causing no damage.						
EF2	E of Gering to SE of Scottsbluff	Scotts Bluff	NE	41.82°N 103.63°W	01:38–01:45	2.48 mi (3.99 km)	700 yd (640 m)
EF2	A strong multiple-vortex tornado formed east of Gering and crossed the North Platte River as it moved northeast, prompting a tornado emergency. A house had major structural damage to the southeast of Scottsbluff, sustaining loss of its roof and some exterior walls. Debris was scattered up to 0.5 mi (0.80 km) away from the house, cars on the property were thrown up to 50 ft (15 m) away, and a small wooden trailer was thrown a quarter-mile. Power poles were snapped and irrigation pivots were overturned elsewhere along the path. The tornado passed over wastewater treatment ponds, sucking water from them before dissipating. A man was injured inside a vehicle that was flipped.						
EF0	N of Johnson City	Stanton	KS	37.67°N 101.75°W	01:40	0.01 mi (0.016 km)	1 yd (0.91 m)
EF0	A storm chaser reported a tornado. It remained over open country and caused no damage.						
EF1	SE of Gering	Scotts Bluff	NE	41.81°N 103.62°W	01:44–01:47	1.24 mi (2.00 km)	50 yd (46 m)
EF1	This tornado was spawned by a secondary circulation just south of the stronger Scottsbluff EF2 tornado. A Quonset hut collapsed and several power poles were snapped.						
EFU	ESE of Gering	Scotts Bluff	NE	41.81°N 103.59°W	01:50	0.5 mi (0.80 km)	50 yd (46 m)
EFU	A trained spotter reported a rain-wrapped tornado over open country. No damage occurred.						
EFU	W of Minatare	Scotts Bluff	NE	41.82°N 103.54°W	02:05	0.5 mi (0.80 km)	50 yd (46 m)
EFU	This tornado was reported by a trained spotter. No damage was found.						
EF0	NE of Johnson City to NW of Ulysses	Stanton, Grant	KS	37.65°N 101.56°W	02:09–02:12	4.21 mi (6.78 km)	1 yd (0.91 m)
EF0	A storm chaser reported a tornado over open country. No damage occurred.						
EFU	E of Johnson City	Stanton	KS	37.59°N 101.56°W	02:15–02:17	1.2 mi (1.9 km)	Unknown
EFU	A cone tornado remained over open country, causing no damage.						
EFU	E of Lynn	Morrill	NE	41.81°N 102.85°W	03:51	0.5 mi (0.80 km)	50 yd (46 m)
EFU	A storm chaser reported a brief tornado that caused no damage.						

=== June 24 event ===
List of confirmed tornadoes – Saturday, June 24, 2023
EF#	Location	County / Parish	State	Start Coord.	Time (UTC)	Path length	Max width
EFU	N of Lake Park to ENE of Hitterdal	Becker	MN	46.98°N 96.04°W	20:18–20:26	1.04 mi (1.67 km)	20 yd (18 m)
EFU	A tornado tracked through an open field and caused no damage.						
EFU	NW of Borup to WSW of Ada	Norman	MN	47.2543°N 96.5841°W	20:30–20:35	2.98 mi (4.80 km)	20 yd (18 m)
EFU	A trained spotter observed a tornado over an open field. No damage occurred.						
EFU	W of Waubun	Mahnomen	MN	47.19°N 96.06°W	20:52–20:54	0.3 mi (0.48 km)	10 yd (9.1 m)
EFU	An intermittent tornado caused no damage.						
EFU	S of Waubun	Mahnomen	MN	47.1563°N 95.9559°W	21:00–21:03	0.24 mi (0.39 km)	10 yd (9.1 m)
EFU	This brief tornado spun up and remained over an open field.						
EFU	NE of Shelly to SE of Nielsville	Norman, Polk	MN	47.49°N 96.73°W	21:10–21:15	1.54 mi (2.48 km)	10 yd (9.1 m)
EFU	A tornado tracked entirely through fields, inflicting no damage.						
EF0	SW of Lockhart	Norman	MN	47.41°N 96.6°W	21:12–21:14	1.97 mi (3.17 km)	20 yd (18 m)
EF0	Some trees were damaged in a shelterbelt.						
EF2	N of Waubun to NE of Mahnomen	Mahnomen	MN	47.25°N 95.94°W	21:15–21:40	6.22 mi (10.01 km)	250 yd (230 m)
EF2	An intermittent but strong, multiple-vortex tornado damaged several farmsteads. A two-story house had its entire roof torn off, a metal Quonset hut was caved in, and a garage was shifted off its foundation and collapsed. Several fuel tanks were thrown over a barn into a shed, knocking it off its foundation. Multiple trees were snapped or uprooted, some power poles were snapped, and crop damage occurred as well.						
EFU	WNW of Ogema	Becker	MN	47.13°N 96.08°W	21:34–21:36	0.49 mi (0.79 km)	10 yd (9.1 m)
EFU	This brief tornado remained over open fields.						
EFU	W of Beltrami	Polk	MN	47.55°N 96.64°W	21:44–21:46	0.47 mi (0.76 km)	10 yd (9.1 m)
EFU	A tornado tracked through fields, causing no damage.						
EFU	NW of Beltrami	Polk	MN	47.58°N 96.61°W	21:49–21:52	0.93 mi (1.50 km)	10 yd (9.1 m)
EFU	This tornado was observed by a storm spotter as it caused no damage through open fields.						
EF0	Northern Davenport	Scott	IA	41.6°N 90.71°W	03:31–03:45	9.63 mi (15.50 km)	20 yd (18 m)
EF0	A weak tornado touched down and left swirl marks in grassy fields as it moved east. It then moved into the northern outskirts of Davenport, where tree branches were snapped and a gas station canopy sustained minor damage at a Flying J truck stop. It also struck the Davenport Airport, where the Quad City Air Show was being held. Damage to tents, canopies, and equipment occurred at the airport before the tornado continued east, causing some additional minor damage to trees and structures before dissipating.						
EF0	N of Pocahontas to WSW of Rolfe	Pocahontas	IA	42.7772°N 94.6547°W	04:02–04:07	2.77 mi (4.46 km)	80 yd (73 m)
EF0	A weak tornado moved a grain bin off its foundation and rolled it into a field.						

=== June 25 event ===
List of confirmed tornadoes – Sunday, June 25, 2023
EF#	Location	County / Parish	State	Start Coord.	Time (UTC)	Path length	Max width
EF2	Southern Greenwood to W of New Whiteland	Johnson	IN	39.5692°N 86.221°W	20:12–20:23	5.4 mi (8.7 km)	400 yd (370 m)
EF2	This strong tornado quickly developed and intensified as it moved east, producing significant damage early on, where bricks were blown off a large home, roofs were damaged, a trailer was displaced into a nearby yard, trees were snapped, and a few power poles were broken. Continuing east through residential neighborhoods, it caused substantial roof damage to homes, snapped and uprooted trees. Near SR 135, the tornado tore the roof off part of an apartment building under construction, broke windows, and drove debris into the ground. The tornado then turned southeast across open land, snapping and uprooting numerous trees where it then lifted.						
EF1	S of Crane	Daviess, Martin	IN	38.887°N 86.958°W	20:21–20:30	3.73 mi (6.00 km)	100 yd (91 m)
EF1	A tornado snapped and uprooted many trees as it moved through areas in and around the Naval Surface Warfare Center Crane Division grounds.						
EF1	WSW of Buenavista to SSE of Kirksville	Monroe	IN	39.0287°N 86.6745°W	20:30–20:37	4.45 mi (7.16 km)	100 yd (91 m)
EF1	A couple of homes suffered extensive roof damage, another house had a window blown out, and multiple barns and outbuildings were damaged or destroyed. Many trees were snapped or uprooted, and several fences were knocked over as well.						
EF2	SSW of Hindostan Falls to WNW of Hillham	Martin, Dubois	IN	38.585°N 86.8666°W	20:34–20:46	9.12 mi (14.68 km)	565 yd (517 m)
EF2	1 death – This strong tornado touched down in a rural area, where a house suffered major roof damage and had its attached garage destroyed. A car was also flipped at this location. The tornado then moved southeastward and caused some ground scouring in open farm fields before it continued into the Hoosier National Forest, where it snapped and uprooted countless large trees. It reached peak intensity as it moved through the rural community of Rusk, where a two-story cabin was completely destroyed, trees were downed, and some power poles were snapped. One person was killed and another was injured in the cabin. The tornado continued to the southeast through remote wooded areas, snapping and uprooting a large swath of trees and destroying some outbuildings before dissipating.						
EF1	ENE of Dover	Pope	AR	35.4178°N 93.0723°W	21:19–21:20	0.6 mi (0.97 km)	50 yd (46 m)
EF1	A brief tornado snapped and uprooted trees along its path.						
EFU	NE of Marche	Pulaski	AR	34.9199°N 92.3054°W	22:37–22:38	0.2 mi (0.32 km)	50 yd (46 m)
EFU	A tornado was photographed over a heavily forested area of Camp Robinson, however it was non-surveyable due to widespread wind damage in the area.						
EF0	Windsor	Essex	ON	42.2903°N 83.0542°W	22:45–?	1.26 mi (2.02 km)	200 yd (180 m)
EF0	A weak tornado moved through residential areas in Windsor, downing tree limbs.						
EF0	Eastern Windsor to Tecumseh	Essex	ON	42.3057°N 82.9091°W	23:00–?	2.91 mi (4.69 km)	130 yd (120 m)
EF0	This tornado caused minor damage as it moved from the east side of Windsor into Tecumseh. Many homes had minor roof and fascia damage, tree branches were downed, and fences were toppled over. A metal building, a business, and the steeple of a church sustained minimal damage as well.						
EF2	W of Cecilia	Hardin	KY	37.682°N 86.0133°W	02:27–02:32	1.17 mi (1.88 km)	300 yd (270 m)
EF2	This strong tornado partially or completely unroofed a few homes near the rural community of Franklin Crossroads. A carport was torn from one house and thrown into a field, and some barns and outbuildings were damaged or destroyed as well. Two vehicles were moved, an RV was knocked over, and a gazebo was thrown. Large trees were snapped or uprooted and some crop damage also occurred.						
EF1	Southwestern Jamestown	Russell	KY	36.9757°N 85.0861°W	04:25–04:26	0.67 mi (1.08 km)	300 yd (270 m)
EF1	A brief high-end EF1 tornado touched down in the southwestern part of Jamestown, where an apartment building and a carpet business both sustained considerable roof damage, and two other buildings had their gabled porch roofs torn off. A small automotive museum and an auto parts store had windows blown out, and a cinder block garage was destroyed. Many trees were snapped or uprooted, and a tree branch was speared through the exterior wall of a house.						

=== June 26 event ===
List of confirmed tornadoes – Monday, June 26, 2023
EF#	Location	County / Parish	State	Start Coord.	Time (UTC)	Path length	Max width
EF0	ENE of Martins Creek to SW of Belvidere, NJ	Northampton	PA	40.7904°N 75.1453°W	18:58–19:04	3.37 mi (5.42 km)	60 yd (55 m)
EF0	A tornado moved through wheat fields, causing minor damage to crops.						
EF0	S of Clearview	Simcoe	ON	44.3857°N 80.1035°W	19:20–?	1.75 mi (2.82 km)	130 yd (120 m)
EF0	A short-lived tornado caused minor damage to homes, fences, trees, and crops.						
EF1	Bernardsville	Somerset	NJ	40.7109°N 74.5804°W	19:29–19:34	1.38 mi (2.22 km)	475 yd (434 m)
EF1	A brief tornado snapped or uprooted numerous trees in Bernardsville, some of which fell on cars and power lines.						
EF0	E of Tweed	Hastings	ON	44.4531°N 77.3223°W	20:35–?	3.81 mi (6.13 km)	490 yd (450 m)
EF0	This tornado began south of Tweed before becoming a waterspout over Stoco Lake. A few trees were snapped or uprooted on the southwestern and northern shorelines of the lake.						
EF1	NNE of Tweed	Hastings	ON	44.5229°N 77.282°W	20:42–?	0.86 mi (1.38 km)	150 yd (140 m)
EF1	Tree damage occurred.						
EF0	NE of Tweed	Hastings	ON	44.4911°N 77.2735°W	20:45–?	2.04 mi (3.28 km)	260 yd (240 m)
EF0	A weak tornado touched down near where the first Tweed tornado dissipated along the northern end of Stoco Lake. A few trees were snapped or uprooted.						
EF1	ENE of Actinolite	Hastings	ON	44.5796°N 77.2735°W	20:48–?	2.59 mi (4.17 km)	300 yd (270 m)
EF1	A tornado moved through remote wooded areas to the east and northeast of Actinolite, snapping and uprooting trees.						
EF0	NW of Kaladar	Hastings, Lennox and Addington	ON	44.6447°N 77.2886°W	20:54–?	5.60 mi (9.01 km)	380 yd (350 m)
EF0	Some trees were downed and a barn sustained minor damage.						
EF1	W of Albin	Laramie	WY	41.411°N 104.339°W	00:42–00:50	3.57 mi (5.75 km)	1,000 yd (910 m)
EF1	A house sustained roof damage and an outbuilding was destroyed, with debris strewn hundreds of yards away. Hay bales weighing up to 1,400 lb (640 kg) were thrown up to 0.5 mi (0.80 km) away. Eight old wooden power poles were snapped shortly before the tornado dissipated.						
EF1	SW of Albin	Laramie	WY	41.365°N 104.28°W	00:52–01:05	3.55 mi (5.71 km)	1,000 yd (910 m)
EF1	A large tornado snapped eleven wooden power poles.						
EF0	SSE Albin	Laramie	WY	41.316°N 104.061°W	01:18	0.1 mi (0.16 km)	50 yd (46 m)
EF0	A brief tornado overturned an irrigation pivot.						
EF1	SW of Kimball	Kimball	NE	41.194°N 103.758°W	02:01–02:05	1.56 mi (2.51 km)	100 yd (91 m)
EF1	A rope tornado touched down south of I-80 and impacted a farmstead, where a cinder block outbuilding was destroyed and debris was tossed up to 50 yd (46 m) away. A shipping container was shifted off its foundation and a 20,000 lb (9,100 kg) tandem-disk plow was moved 15 ft (4.6 m).						
EFU	S of Kimball	Kimball	NE	41.2°N 103.66°W	02:29	0.5 mi (0.80 km)	50 yd (46 m)
EFU	An NWS employee observed a brief tornado. No damage occurred.						

=== Matador, Texas ===
Matador, Texas
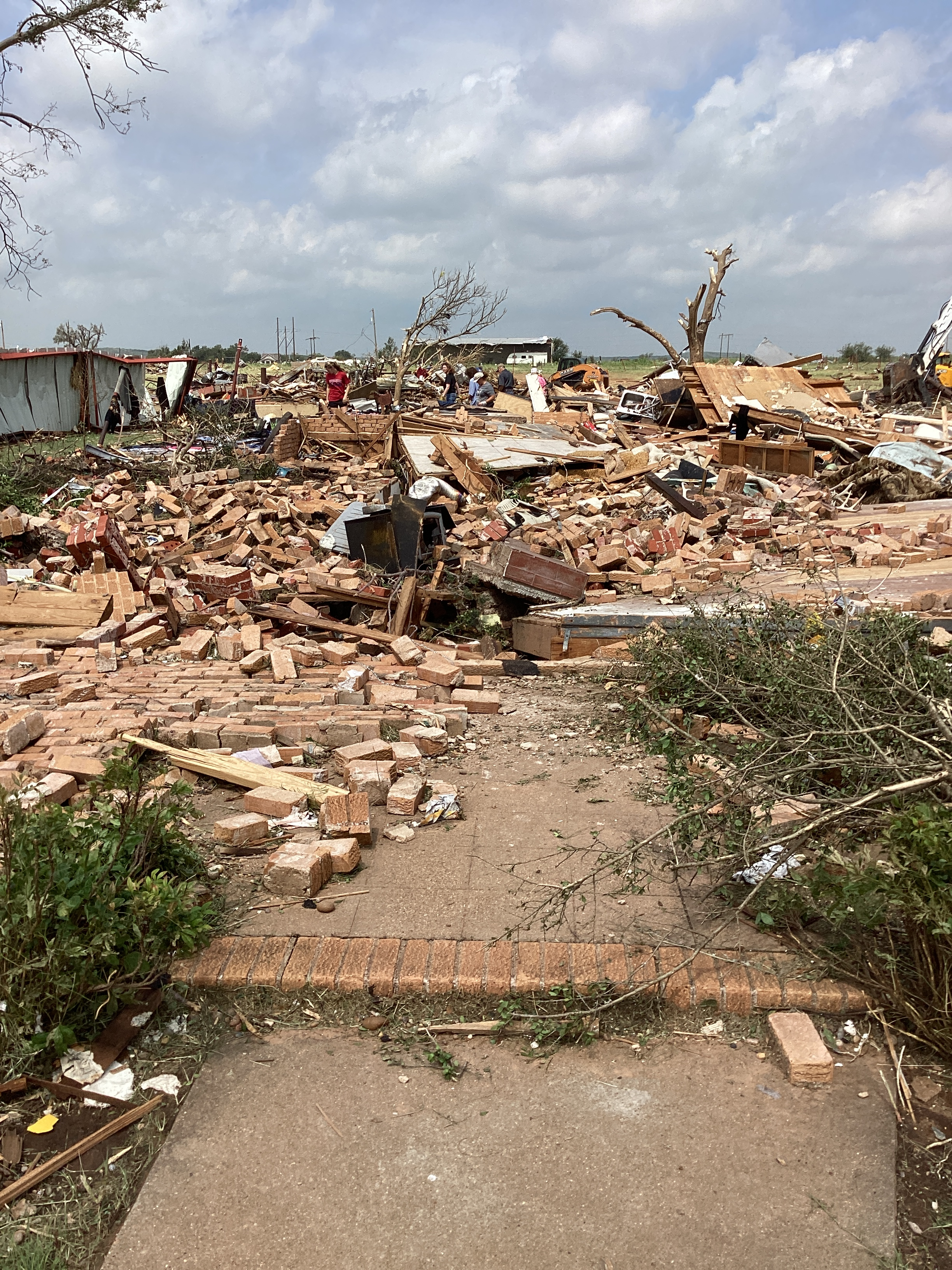
- High end EF3 damage to a home in Matador.

Meteorological history
- Formed: June 21, 2023, 7:51 p.m. CDT (UTC−05:00)
- Dissipated: June 21, 2023, 8:09 p.m. CDT (UTC−05:00)
- Duration: 18 minutes

EF3 tornado
- on the Enhanced Fujita scale
- Highest winds: 165 mph (266 km/h)

Overall effects
- Casualties: 4 fatalities, 15 injuries

This intense and destructive tornado touched down along CR 205 to the north-northwest of Matador and tracked due-south at EF2 strength, snapping multiple power poles and trees. The tornado turned in a more south-southeastward direction and rapidly intensified to high-end EF3 intensity near FM 94 just northwest of Matador. A house was swept completely away in this area with only its basement left behind, where a family of three survived as the house was swept away above them. Two vehicles parked at this residence were thrown long distances and were never located, while a third was found hundreds of yards away. A large metal canopy on the property was also destroyed, and trees near the residence were uprooted and significantly debarked. The tornado then moved south through an open field, producing a swath of ground scouring before it destroyed two homes near SH 70 as it entered the far northwestern outskirts of Matador. A truck was thrown over 200 feet from one home and was mangled beyond recognition, two more homes near Pipkin Street had their roofs torn off, extreme debarking of trees was observed in this area, and damage along this segment of the path was rated mid-range EF3. The tornado reached high-end EF3 intensity again as it continued due-south, completely destroying multiple buildings at the intersection of US 62 and SH 70 at the west edge of town. A two-story brick home and several nearby outbuildings were completely swept away near Stewart Avenue, and another brick home was flattened at the intersection of Dundee Avenue and Echols Road.

Several other homes in this area were significantly damaged and multiple vehicles were rolled and mangled, one of which had a metal pole driven into it. A tractor-trailer was tossed as well, and debris was strewn throughout this area. A recently built, metal-framed Dollar General store on the south side of US 62 was completely leveled at high-end EF3 intensity, with its beams twisted and bolted anchor plates torn from the building's concrete foundation. Concrete parking bollards at this location were snapped at ground-level as well, and a semi-truck was torn from its chassis and destroyed, killing the driver. Two convenience stores to the east of the Dollar General store were damaged, and a restaurant and motel were both partially destroyed. A small house and several metal buildings were completely destroyed nearby, one of which had sections of its tile floor removed. Trees in this area were again debarked, some of which were torn of out the ground by their root balls. An RV was thrown and a power substation was partially collapsed as well, leaving 99% of the town without electricity. Past the intersection, the tornado maintained high-end EF3 strength as it paralleled SH 70 and kept moving south, causing major damage at the southwest edge of town. A home was completely leveled and mostly swept from its foundation, and large trees were completely debarked and stripped of their branches nearby. Several other houses suffered major structural damage, and a large metal outbuilding was completely swept off its foundation. A truck was thrown and had its Ford Power Stroke engine ripped out, which was tossed into a pond. A livestock trailer was thrown as well, and debris from destroyed buildings was scattered across fields.

The tornado started to weaken and began moving in a more south-southeasterly direction as it crossed SH 70, where it destroyed a guyed 500-foot (150 m) tall radio tower and caused additional major tree damage. A house near the highway was destroyed, and damage in this area was rated low-end EF3. Some ground scouring was observed in this area, and multiple fence posts, power poles, light poles, and signs were blown to the ground along the highway as well. The tornado then weakened rapidly and turned further to the southeast, inflicting minor damage to a house and a barn before it dissipated in a nearby field. In total, four people were killed and 15 others were injured by the tornado. One of the four people killed by the tornado was first reported as injured and later died at a local hospital.

== Non-tornadic events ==
=== Great Plains ===
On June 21, a downburst produced estimated winds of 125 mph (201 km/h) near Selfridge, North Dakota. A manufactured home was completely destroyed with debris strewn downstream. One person was injured. That day, a person was killed in Nebraska due to a lightning strike.

Around 9:30 p.m. MDT, a hailstorm impacted the Red Rocks Amphitheatre in the Denver metropolitan area during a concert. Hailstones up to 2 in (5.1 cm) in diameter pelted concertgoers and accumulated several inches deep in the stands. Three acts were scheduled that night with the second being delayed 15 minutes prior to the storm's arrival. Attendees did not seek shelter until a warning to do so was given 3 minutes before the hail started. Nearly 100 people were injured, with injuries ranging from cuts and bruises to broken bones, as they were unable to get indoors or to their cars in time; 8 people required hospitalization. An employee described people as having panic attacks and other workers being frozen and unable to act. Numerous cars were damaged in the venue's parking lot. Severe weather that night forced a Major League Soccer game between the Colorado Rapids and Vancouver Whitecaps to be postponed. The storm also caused one fatality due to flooding in Arapahoe County, Colorado.

=== Southeastern United States ===
The same supercell that produced the EF3 Matador tornado also produced destructive winds and hail, with gusts measured up to 109 mph (175 km/h) in Jayton and hailstones exceeding 4 in (10 cm) in diameter. Sustained winds in Jayton were also measured up to 86 mph (138 km/h). At least 900 people were left without power from the storm. A powerful thunderstorm impacted the Greater Houston area, leaving roughly 324,000 customers without power. A narrow area of hurricane-force winds impacted George Bush Intercontinental Airport where a record gust of 97 mph (156 km/h) was observed. This surpassed the airport's previous highest gust of 82 mph (132 km/h) during Hurricane Ike in 2008.

On June 25, widespread damaging winds left almost 150,000 customers without power in Arkansas. Two people were killed in Carlisle when a tree fell on their home and one person was injured in another incident. Governor Sarah Huckabee Sanders declared a state of emergency on June 26. Severe storms in Georgia left approximately 300,000 people without power. One person was killed in northern Atlanta when a tree fell on him. Two people were injured in Cherokee County. At Hartsfield-Jackson Atlanta International Airport, the storms prompted the cancellation of 86 flights and delayed an additional 57 flights. The combination of heavy rain and winds caused trees to fall at the North Georgia Wildlife Park in White County; several animal enclosures required repairs. A macroburst impacted Madison County, Kentucky, with damage spanning an area 2.5 mi (4 km) wide and 8.4 mi (13.5 km) long. Maximum winds were estimated at 110 mph (180 km/h). Numerous trees were snapped or uprooted and many barns and homes suffered roof damage. Winds of 90 to 100 mph (140 to 160 km/h) affected parts of Bullitt County. Straight-line winds of 90 to 95 mph (145 to 153 km/h) impacted Floyd County, Indiana, with a barn having its roof torn off and thrown 150 yd (140 m) downstream.

=== Northeastern United States ===
On June 26, heavy rain led to flash flooding in New Jersey, with rainfall peaking at 3.99 in (101 mm) in Paterson. Over 16,000 customers in New Jersey lost power due to the storms. In the Lehigh Valley, rainfall totals were in the 2.5–5.5 in (64–140 mm) range, leading to 3,300 power outages. Rainfall totals reached 4.71 in (120 mm) in the state of Delaware. The storm led to over 500 flights delayed and 300 flights cancelled at Newark Liberty International Airport, as well as ground stops at both LaGuardia Airport and John F. Kennedy International Airport. In total, over 7,000 flights were delayed due to severe weather, with 811 flights being cancelled, on June 26. Flooding also resulted in U.S. Route 9 shutting down in Latham Circle. Major League Baseball suspended a baseball game at Camden Yards for two hours due to the storms.

== See also ==
- List of North American tornadoes and tornado outbreaks
- Weather of 2023
- Tornadoes of 2023
- List of United States tornadoes in June 2023
- Tornado outbreak of June 18–22, 2011
