= 1924 Thurman tornado =

Deadly F4 tornado in Colorado, United States

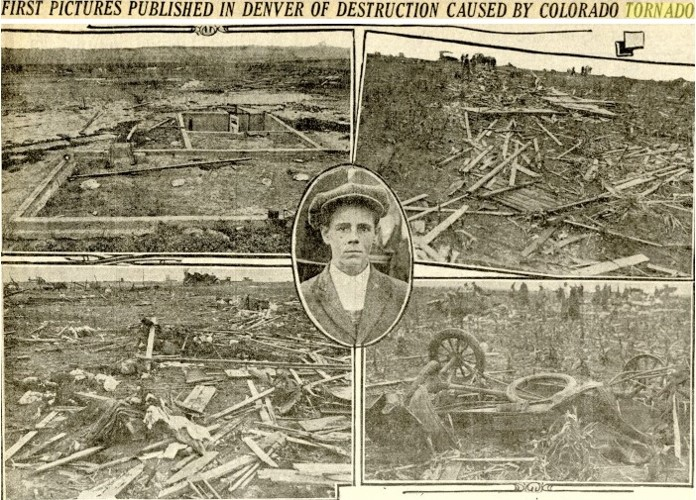
- The tornado's damage documented in a newspaper.

Meteorological history
- Formed: August 10, 1924, 2:30 p.m. MDT (UTC−06:00)
- Dissipated: August 10, 1924, ~3:00 p.m. MDT (UTC−06:00)
- Duration: ~30 minutes

F4 tornado
- on the Fujita scale
- Max width: 200–880 yards (0.11–0.50 mi; 0.18–0.80 km)
- Path length: >8 miles (13 km)
- Highest winds: 207–260 mph (333–418 km/h)

Overall effects
- Fatalities: 11
- Injuries: 7
- Areas affected: Thurman, Colorado
- Part of the Tornadoes of 1924

In the afternoon hours of 10 August 1924, an extremely rare, and violent tornado struck communities near Thurman in Washington County, Colorado, United States. The tornado traveled along a 8–10 mi (13–16 km) path, causing 11 fatalities and injuring 7 others. It was officially rated as an F4 on the Fujita Scale, and was unofficially rated as an EF4 on the Enhanced Fujita Scale by NWS Boulder after a re-analysis on the tornado nearly 100 years later. It was the deadliest and strongest tornado in Colorado ever documented.

== Tornado summary ==
This violent tornado touched down west-southwest of Thurman at approximately 2:30 p.m. MDT. It first moved east-northeast tracking through rural Washington County.

The tornado affected a 27-person gathering at a local farm, owned by the Kuhn family. During the tornado, the men went outside to see if there was any damage caused by the tornado and found no damage, so they made their return into the home, only to see the tornado heading towards them.

The tornado moved onto the Kuhn property and the home was lifted and thrown from its foundation into a nearby field. All buildings on the Kuhn's property were destroyed, including a home, several barns, and a chicken house. After the tornado passed, it continued through rural country causing little to no damage before dissipating.

== Aftermath ==
=== Initial Response ===
Doctors and physicians from the towns of Akron and Flagler arrive, when they came, everything was destroyed. Bodies were scattered across the land with survivors being taken to nearby farmhouses to get treated from their injuries.

10 out of 27 people at the Kuhn's house were killed, eight of the others suffered different degrees of injuries. The community grieved for the deceased and held an outdoor funeral. It was the largest gathering locals could remember with over 1,000 people who showed up to pay respects.
