= John Ketcham (Indiana surveyor) =

American politician (1782–1865)

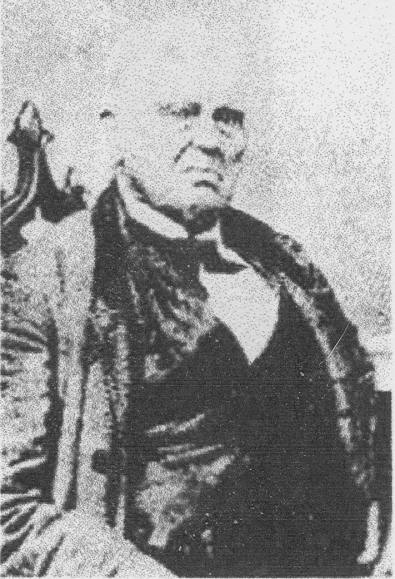
Colonel John Ketcham.

Colonel John Ketcham (September 10, 1782 – February 5, 1865) was an American surveyor, building contractor and judge.

The founding father of Brownstown, Indiana, Ketcham was famed for his military escapades against Native Americans. His father was supposedly held captive by Native Americans.

He was awarded titles during his life, among them an honorable Colonel and judge honorable (from serving the State Legislature). Ketcham was also a self-taught surveyor and building contractor. One of his most highly prized titles, however, was that as of one of General Andrew Jackson's electors. He also was listed as one of the first trustees of Indiana University.

== Early years ==
John Ketcham was born in Washington County, Maryland to Daniel Ketcham and Keziah Pigmon Lewis. He had eight siblings. His father had signed the Patriot's Oath of Allegiance in 1778. In May 1784, when Ketcham was two years old, his family moved from Maryland to Louisville, Kentucky, eventually settling down near Shelbyville, Kentucky where he spent his early years.

He was said to have told his story about the trip: "When coming down the Ohio River on a raft, a wildcat was spotted on a tree branch over-hanging the river, it was shot and it fell before me on the boat."

Though Ketcham's father was presented with 1,400 acres of land by the government in Shelby County, Kentucky, the family struggled financially.

== Ketcham family origins ==
The Ketcham family can trace its history back to 1590 when Edward Ketcham was born in England. He immigrated to America in 1629 and the Ketchams remained in the East until John Ketcham's father, a great-grandson of Edward, came to the West in 1784, settling down in Shelby County, Kentucky.

In 1792, Daniel was carried away by a small band of Tawa (Ottawa) who led him on a march lasting several days.

Daniel claimed his captors forced him through many hardships, namely carrying a full pack while marching through the wilds and fording rivers. After several days of this, Daniel pretended to be injured and began limping.

The Tawas relieved him of his pack and he proceeded to walk with ease. However, while crossing a log bridge, he ran and forgot to hobble. His captors noticed and immediately loaded him with all he could bear.

Allegedly, the group came to a large camp near Detroit, Michigan, where Daniel was kept prisoner until, one day, his captors led him to a stake where a fire had been prepared. He was blackened and made ready to die in the fire when a maiden decorated with "fully 500 silver broaches", came forth, denouncing the group and taking Daniel for herself.

She supposedly cared for him until he was later able to escape the tribe and make his way into Canada, then back to his original home in Maryland. He was eventually able to return home to Kentucky, two years after his capture. It was said his wife and family there never had given up hope for his return.

His wife, when he had been captured, kept the neighbors from pursuing the group lest Daniel be the victim of a tomahawk death, because she believed that God would bring him back to her.

== Personal life ==
In 1803, John Ketcham married Elizabeth Pearsy in Kentucky. They had 12 children. Six were born in Kentucky and six more were born in the Indiana Territory after the family moved in 1811. His grandson was William A. Ketcham (Indiana Attorney General from 1894 to 1898), and his granddaughter was Susan Merrill Ketcham (a notable Indiana painter). The maternal grandmother of William A. and Susan M. Ketcham was Samuel Merrill (Indiana State Treasurer from 1822 to 1834).

== Native fighting ==
From 1809 to 1818, fighting Native Americans was almost an everyday occurrence for the settlers in South Central Indiana, in attempts to claim the area. In 1811, Ketcham moved to Fort Vallonia.

Ketcham's Fort was built on Ketcham's land and lay between Huff's Fort and Fort Vallonia, which is now Jackson County, making it of vital importance for settlers for security and safety prior to and after the Treaty of Grouseland. Most of the fighting between settlers and Native Americans took place from 1812 to 1813. In his own words:

In June 1813, I enlisted in the United States service as a mounted ranger. In my first month's service I killed and scalped an Indian, was very proud of it, got leave to go home and show it to Daddy and Mama. I guess they thought I had done about right. I continued in the rangers two whole years, saw some hard times, was eighty days from my family on one campaign, and lived seventeen days on seven days' rations.

— John Ketcham

The area was still controlled by the Native Americans, some willing to have peaceful relationships with the settlers; most of them were unhappy over the constant threat to their lands by white settlers by the signing of treaties with the white men their lands were diminishing. The Ten O'Clock Treaty, signed in 1809 and the Treaty of Grouseland, signed in 1805, formed a triangular boundary, of which this area was in the southernmost part.

With forts in Vincennes, Terre Haute and Fort Wayne, the area was not particularly well guarded.

Temporary forts were built to allow the homesteaders to clear and till the soil and find safety at night inside the protecting walls of the forts. They were built on a line south of just south of Vallonia through Brownstown and on toward the east.

Fort Vallonia was manned with 100 troops of the territory militia and afforded protection nearby to the other small forts on up the way. Ketcham's Fort was located on or near the spot where the Asher Woodmansee home now stands and was occupied by a few families. Only the other fort, Huff's Fort, lay between Ketcham and Vallonia all that time.

The troubled area, as he put it, was in that portion of the Indiana Territory, commonly called the "Forks", situated between the Muscatatuck and Driftwood fork of the White River. The Native Americans were numerous and friendly in that area before the Tippecanoe Battle in 1811.

However, the Delaware tribe expressed disapproval of the battle and many left the territory then, but several remained. Constant harassment was given the settlers with occasional killing and horse thievery being committed by the Natives, but no large battles occurred at that time.

In April 1812, Ketcham recalled a man was murdered near Ketcham's fort and the colonel and another man retrieved the body, found stripped and thrown in the river. The next day, three Natives came to Ketcham's door. They could speak decent English, and the colonel asked them what was new. They replied, "None." Ketcham asked them to accompany him to the site of the murder. They agreed.

However, Ketcham's wife begged him not to go with them like his children. When they had gotten a mile or so away, the Native Americans said they would go no farther as it would make the white men mad.

So they returned to Ketcham's place to find his wife; the children had vanished. They had expected an ambush from the Natives and hid in the forest.

About 10 days later, there came two natives with white flags and a note from the Delaware tribe that the trouble had been caused by the Kickapoo tribe, and was not the Delaware. Supposedly the two Delaware messengers stayed on in the fort working for the white men after the peaceful settlement.

There were nearly 70 families in the forts at that time, but after several violent encounters with disgruntled Native Americans, about 50 families left and went back to Kentucky for safer territory. The remaining settlers were determined not to leave and had built blockhouses for protection.

Once, upon discovering some Native Americans attempting to steal horses, the settlers gave pursuit to John Ketcham while directing the chase when shot. Shortly after this episode, he enlisted for two years in the territory militia.

He fought under General John Tipton and participated in many conflicts with the Natives including the one on Tipton's Island, which got its name from the Natives who fight there with Tipton's men. Ketcham murdered and scalped a Native American on his first trip out. He was carried on the muster roll as First Sergeant.

He wrote that on one campaign he was away from home for 88 days and lived on a week's simple rations. He was a ranger in the militia and received a dollar a day in pay, "sustaining himself" as he put it, which meant finding his own food and clothes. After General Tipton's rough treatment of the Native Americans at the battle of Tipton's Island, Ketcham wrote the Native Americans retreated and were more wary of the invaders.

Two humorous tales he told about his service concerned fording a creek on horseback. The creek was flooded and difficult to cross. He and his friend's horses became mired and stuck fast in the mud. The friend, Jack Storm, had his name attached to the creek and it remains so to this day as Jack's Defeat in Monroe County.

== In Jackson County, Indiana ==
In 1815, Ketcham was released from the service and returned to his home in Jackson County, Indiana. He was honored by Governor William Henry Harrison with rank of colonel in a regiment of the state's militia.

In 1816, Ketcham sold to the county government 153.4 acres (0.621 km^{2}) of ground for 8 dollars per acre, donating the block of land where the Jackson County Courthouse now stands.

In 1816, Ketcham received a judgeship from General William Henry Harrison and remained in that position until 1817.

He also helped lay out the town of Brownstown, the location of which was picked because of its central geographical location in the county.

== In Monroe County, Indiana ==
In 1818, Colonel Ketcham moved to Monroe County, Indiana six or seven miles (11 km) from Bloomington near Victor and Harrodsburg. He built a gristmill on Clear Creek the first year. When the city of Bloomington was laid out in 1818, Ketcham was asked to design and contract for building of the first courthouse there.

In 1836, Colonel Ketcham was named one of General Andrew Jackson's electors for the Presidential election of that year. He served in the Indiana House of Representatives.

Colonel Ketcham was later appointed a trustee of the Indiana Seminary which would become Indiana University. A chapel, financed by Indiana University chaplain Frank O. Beck and his wife, Daisy Ketcham Beck, was built on the Indiana University campus. Stone used in the chapel was quarried from Colonel Ketcham's original farm to make the project more realistic.

Colonel Ketcham and a co-worker established a Methodist religious school on grounds at the south end of College Avenue in Bloomington. It was a frame building 30 by 60 feet and later enlarged.

Colonel Ketcham is buried in the Ketcham family cemetery in Monroe County. The cemetery is still maintained by family members.

== In popular culture ==
Ketcham has a similar name to a character in The Amityville Horror films and books. The fictional Ketcham is cited as a reason why the house at 112 Ocean Avenue is haunted and why Ronald DeFeo Jr. killed his family. Both the film and book say that Ketcham moved from Salem, Massachusetts and into Amityville, New York during the Salem Witch trials. This Ketcham caricature in the 1979 and 2005 films was said to have killed multiple Native Americans and himself in a secret part of the house in the basement. The real Ketcham is not known to have been to either Salem, Massachusetts nor Amityville, New York and was born more than a century after the character in the book was said to have lived.
