= Last Chance, Colorado =

Unincorporated community in Washington County, CO, USA

- Unincorporated community
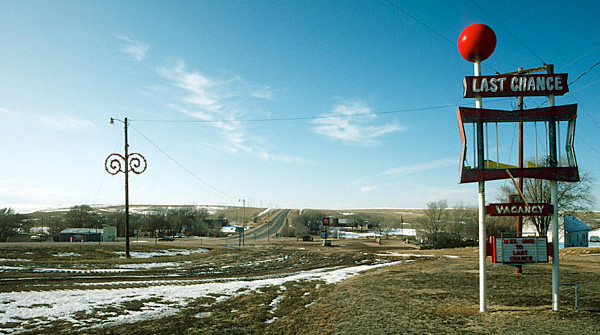
- Looking north, SH 71 is going through the community.

- Location in Washington County and the state of Colorado Last Chance, Colorado (the United States)
- Coordinates: 39°44′27″N 103°35′30″W
- Country: United States
- State: Colorado
- County: Washington
- Elevation: 4,820 ft (1,470 m)

Population (2021)
  - Total: 23
- Time zone: UTC-7 (MST)
  - Summer (DST): UTC-6 (MDT)
- ZIP code: 80757 (Woodrow)
- Area code: 970
- GNIS feature ID: 195018

Last Chance is an unincorporated town in Washington County, Colorado, United States. Last Chance is situated at the intersection of U.S. Highway 36 and State Highway 71 in a sparsely populated area of northeastern Colorado. The town was supposedly so named because it was once the only place for travelers to secure fuel and provisions for many miles in any direction. The U.S. Post Office at Woodrow (ZIP Code 80757) now serves Last Chance postal addresses.

Hee Haw saluted Last Chance, Colorado (pop. 25) on Nov 16, 1974.

== 1993 tornadoes ==
On July 21, 1993 between 7:00 and 8:45, 5 tornadoes touched down in the Last Chance, Lindon area. The strongest was an F3. There were 2 F1s and 2 F0s. The tornadoes did not kill or cause any injury but several farms were destroyed.

== 2012 Wildfire ==
On June 25, 2012, a wildfire that started from sparks caused by a flat tire of a passing motorist on Washington County Road №7 burned most of the town, leaving only a few charred structures standing, including the United Methodist Church. By the morning of June 26, 2012, the blaze had been stopped, but not before burning 45,000 acres between Last Chance and Woodrow, Colorado - the nearest community. Last Chance and Woodrow had to be evacuated during the blaze, but residents were allowed to return on June 26. Firefighters from fire departments in Brush, Hillrose, Snyder, Merino, Fort Morgan, Seibert, Burlington, Stratton, Flagler, Idalia, Joes, Sterling, Akron and Bennett as well as Colorado Department of Transportation crews battled the blaze through the night, allowing for the lift of the evacuations.

== See also ==
- U.S. Highway 36
- Washington County, Colorado
