= Atwood, Colorado =

Census-designated place in Logan County, Colorado, United States

- census-designated place
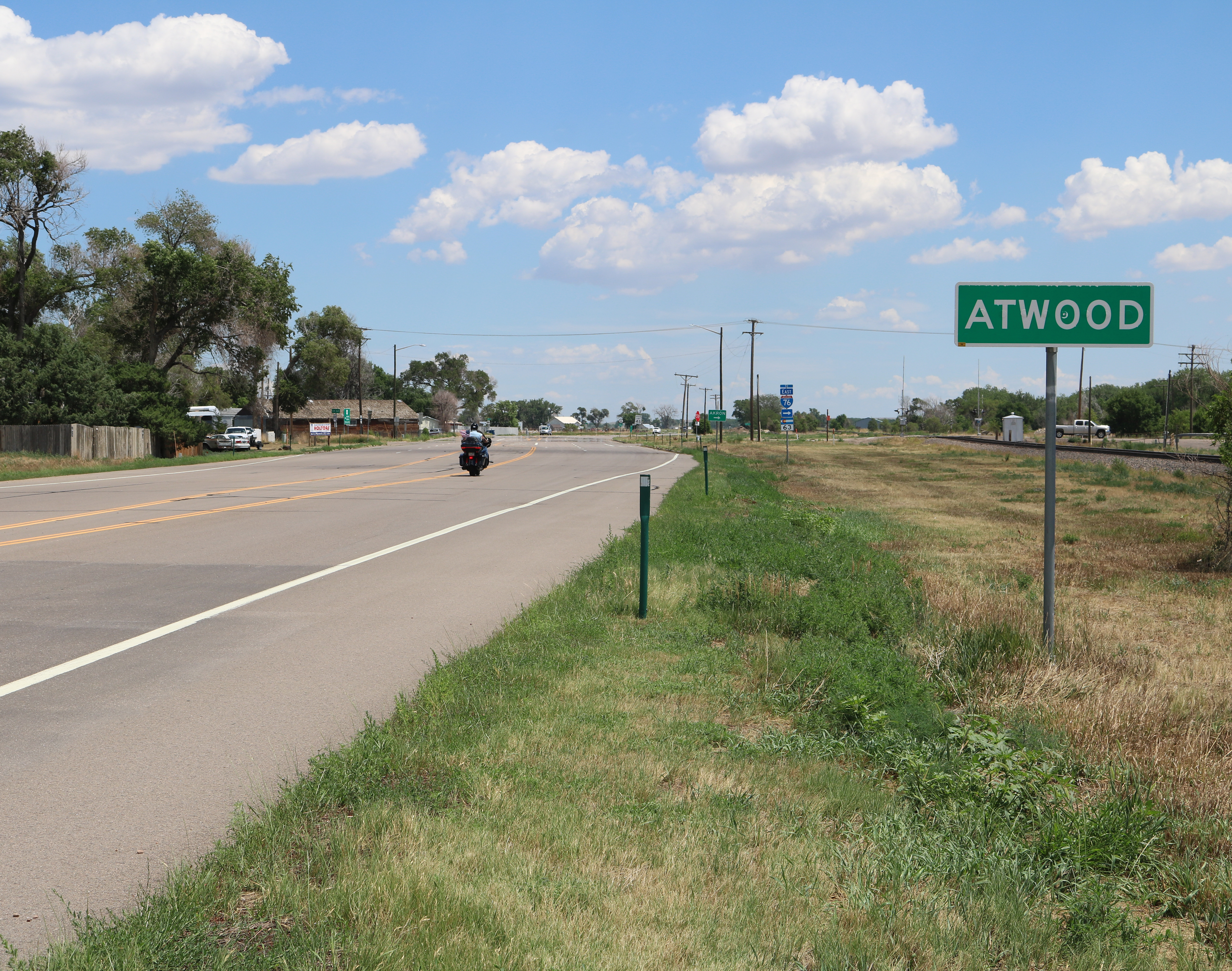
- Entering Atwood from the southwest along U.S. Route 6

- Location of the Atwood CDP in Logan County, Colorado
- Coordinates: 40°33′02″N 103°16′29″W
- Country: United States
- State: Colorado
- County: Logan

Government
  - Type: unincorporated community
  - Body: Logan County

Area
  - Total: 1.034 sq mi (2.678 km^{2})
  - Land: 1.034 sq mi (2.678 km^{2})
  - Water: 0 sq mi (0.000 km^{2})
- Elevation: 4,003 ft (1,220 m)

Population (2020)
  - Total: 138
  - Density: 133/sq mi (51.5/km^{2})
- Time zone: UTC−07:00 (MST)
  - Summer (DST): UTC−06:00 (MDT)
- ZIP Code: 80722
- Area code: 970
- GNIS town ID: 2407778
- FIPS code: 08-03840

Atwood is an unincorporated community, a post office, and a census-designated place (CDP) located in Logan County, Colorado, United States. The CDP is a part of the Sterling, CO Micropolitan Statistical Area. At the United States Census 2020, the population of the Atwood CDP was 138.

== History ==
The Atwood, Colorado, post office opened on August 10, 1885. The community was named after John Atwood, a Unitarian minister.

== Geography ==
Atwood is located in southwestern Logan County. U.S. Route 6 passes through the community, leading northeast 7 miles (11 km) to Sterling, the county seat, and southwest 6 miles (10 km) to Merino. Colorado State Highway 63 leads south from Atwood 3 miles (5 km) to Exit 115 on Interstate 76 and 27 miles (43 km) to Akron.

At the 2020 United States census, the Atwood CDP had an area of 662 acres (2.678 km^{2}), all land.

=== Climate ===
This climate type occurs mostly on the outsides of the true deserts, in low-latitude semi-arid steppe regions. The Köppen Climate Classification subtype for this climate is "BSk". (Tropical and Subtropical Steppe Climate).

Climate data for Atwood, Colorado
Month	Jan	Feb	Mar	Apr	May	Jun	Jul	Aug	Sep	Oct	Nov	Dec	Year
Mean daily maximum °C (°F)	4 (39)	6 (43)	11 (51)	16 (60)	21 (70)	27 (81)	31 (88)	31 (87)	26 (78)	18 (65)	10 (50)	4 (40)	17 (63)
Mean daily minimum °C (°F)	−10 (14)	−8 (17)	−4 (24)	1 (33)	6 (43)	11 (52)	14 (58)	14 (57)	9 (48)	2 (36)	−4 (24)	−9 (16)	2 (35)
Average precipitation mm (inches)	10 (0.4)	13 (0.5)	28 (1.1)	51 (2)	71 (2.8)	66 (2.6)	66 (2.6)	53 (2.1)	30 (1.2)	25 (1)	15 (0.6)	13 (0.5)	440 (17.4)
Source: Weatherbase

== Demographics ==
The United States Census Bureau initially defined the Atwood CDP for the United States Census 2000.

Atwood CDP, Colorado
Year	Pop.	±%
2000	195	—
2010	133	−31.8%
2020	138	+3.8%
Source: United States Census Bureau

== See also ==
- Sterling, CO Micropolitan Statistical Area
