= Colorado Plains Regional Airport =

- IATA: AKO; ICAO: KAKO; FAA LID: AKO

Summary
- Airport type: Public
- Owner: Town of Akron
- Location: Akron, Colorado
- Elevation AMSL: 4,714 ft (1,437 m)
- Coordinates: 40°10′32″N 103°13′19″W
- Interactive map of Colorado Plains Regional Airport

Runways
Direction	Length		Surface
Direction	ft	m	Surface
11/29	7,001	2,134	Asphalt

Statistics (2015)
- Aircraft operations: 20,900
- Based aircraft: 9
- Source: Federal Aviation Administration

Colorado Plains Regional Airport (IATA: AKO, ICAO: KAKO, FAA LID: AKO) is a public-use airport located on the north side city limits of Akron, Colorado, a town in Washington County, Colorado, United States. The airport is approximately 115 miles (185 km) northeast of Denver.

== Facilities and aircraft ==
Colorado Plains Regional Airport covers an area of 639 acres (259 ha) at an elevation of 4,716 feet (1,437 m) above mean sea level. It has one runway designated 11/29 with a 7,001 by 100 ft (2,134 by 30 m) asphalt pavement.

For the 12-month period ending December 31, 2015, the airport had 20,900 aircraft operations, an average of 57 per day: 96% general aviation, and 4% military. At that time there were 9 aircraft based at this airport: all single-engine.

Services: TSNT Storage (hangars and tiedowns), fuel (100LL, JET A1), courtesy car, public phone and computerized WX planning in FBO, aircraft and hangar rentals, instructional services, aerial spraying (April – October).

== See also ==
- List of airports in Colorado
