= John F. and Malissa Koontz House =

Historic house in Indiana, United States

- U.S. National Register of Historic Places
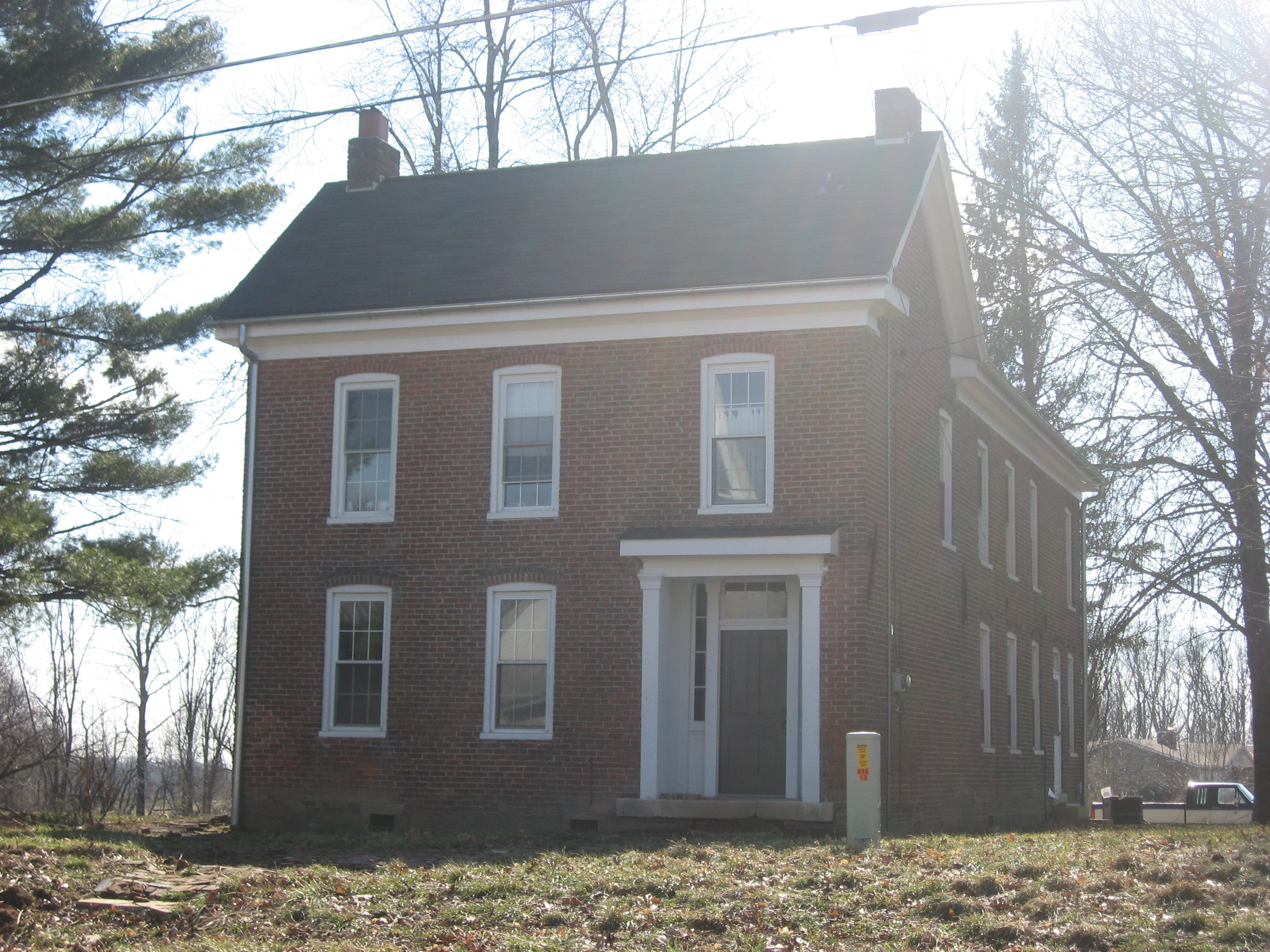
- Koontz House, February 2013

- Location within Indiana Location within the United States
- Location: 7401 S. Mount Zion Rd., southwest of Bloomington in Indian Creek Township, Monroe County, Indiana
- Coordinates: 39°04′05″N 86°37′34″W
- Area: 6.1 acres (2.5 ha)
- Built: 1872
- Architectural style: Greek Revival, Two-thirds I-house
- NRHP reference No.: 14000075
- Added to NRHP: March 26, 2014

John F. and Malissa Koontz House, also known as the Koontz House and Koontz-Engle House, is a historic home located at Indian Creek Township, Monroe County, Indiana. It was built in 1872, and is a two-story, Greek Revival style brick two-thirds I-house. It rests on a hammered limestone foundation and has a side-gable roof. Also on the property is the contributing brick walkway.

It was listed on the National Register of Historic Places in 2014.
