= Pinneo, Colorado =

Ghost town in Colorado, U.S.

Coordinates: 40°12′34″N 103°26′19″W

Pinneo is a ghost town in Washington County, in the U.S. state of Colorado. The community is classified as a populated place.

A post office called Pinneo was established in 1883, and remained in operation until 1931. The community was named after B. F. Pinneo, a local law enforcement agent.
