= Thurman, Colorado =

Unincorporated community in Washington County, CO, USA

- Unincorporated community
- Location within the state of Colorado
- Coordinates: 39°35′46″N 103°13′03″W
- Country: United States
- State: State of Colorado
- County: Washington County
- Established: About 1902
- Elevation: 4,951 ft (1,509 m)
- Time zone: UTC-7 (MST)
  - Summer (DST): UTC-6 (MDT)
- ZIP Code: 80801
- GNIS feature ID: 1950960

Thurman is an unincorporated community in Washington County, Colorado, United States. It was originally a Mennonite settlement.

== History ==
Thurman was established about 1902. The Thurman Post Office opened in July 1904, but closed on August 10, 1924: the US Post Office at Anton (ZIP 80801) now serves Thurman. The town once boasted a population of over 150 people, but declined after a 1924 tornado killed ten people meeting at a home. By the 1970s, the Mennonite population had relocated, along with their church building, to Joes, Colorado.

== Geography ==
Thurman is located at the intersection along unpaved county roads County Roads 3 and CC, 9 miles south of Anton in southern Washington County, about 6 miles north of the Lincoln county line.

== 1924 tornado ==
On August 10, 1924 at about 2:30 pm, a large and violent tornado touched down about 3 miles (4.8 km) to the west of Thurman. The tornado produced wind speeds of 210 mph (340 km/h). It is speculated that it was an F4 to low end F5. The tornado destroyed almost every building and killed 11 people, making it the deadliest tornado in Colorado history. After the tornado, the population declined with most residents moving to nearby towns.

== See also ==
- List of cities and towns in Colorado
