= Colorado State Highway 63 =

State highway in Colorado, United States

State Highway 63
- SH 63 highlighted in red

Route information
- Maintained by CDOT
- Length: 56.4 mi (90.8 km)

Major junctions
- South end: US 36 at Anton
- US 34 at Akron; I-76 south of Atwood
- North end: US 6 at Atwood

Location
- Country: United States
- State: Colorado
- Counties: Washington, Logan

Highway system
- Colorado State Highway System; Interstate; US; State; Scenic
← SH 62	→ SH 64

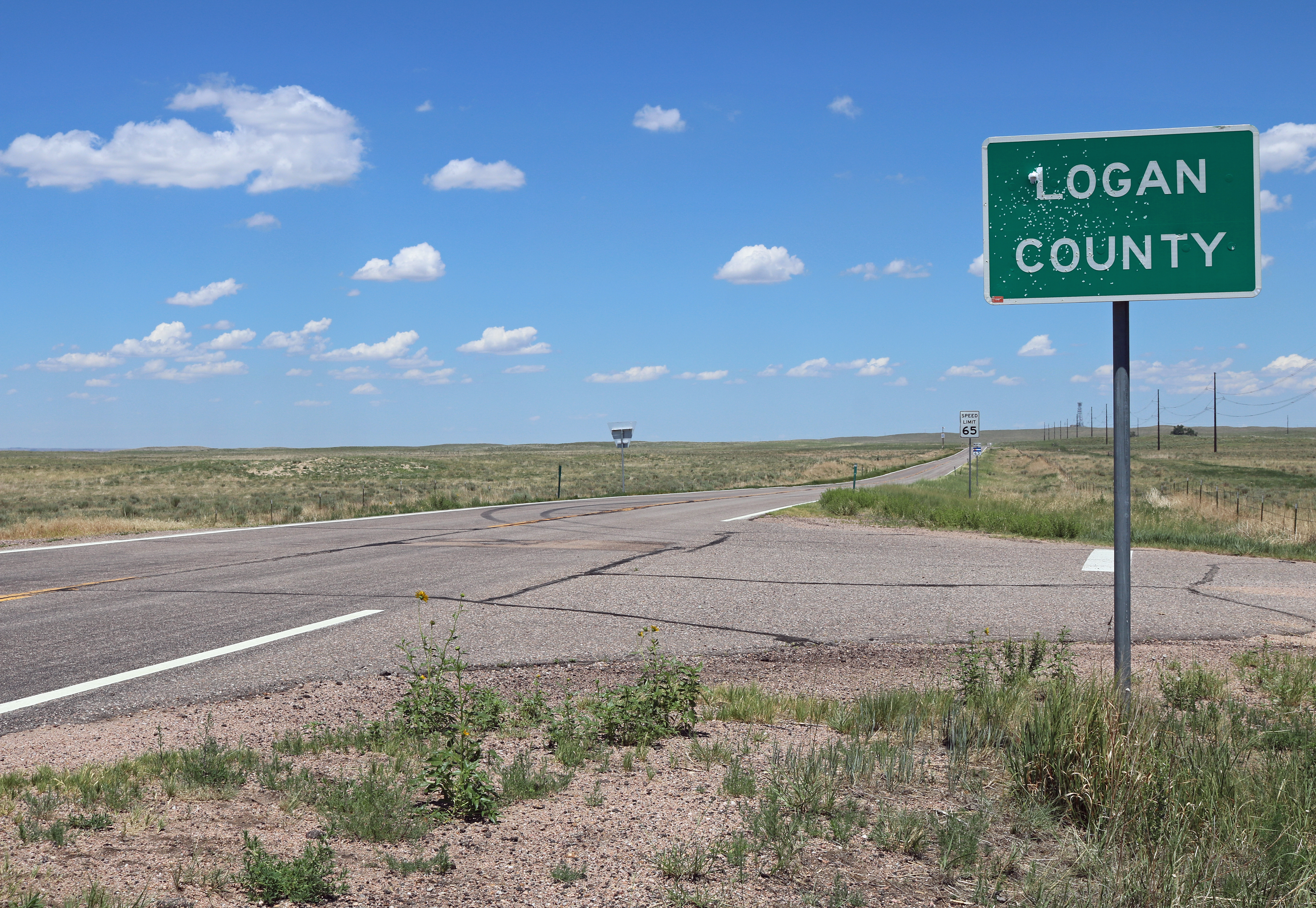
Looking north along Highway 63 at the Logan / Washington county line

State Highway 63 (SH 63) is a 56.4 mi (90.8 km) long state highway in northeastern Colorado. SH 63's southern terminus is at U.S. Route 36 (US 36) in Anton, and the northern terminus is at US 6 in Atwood.

== Route description ==
SH 63 begins in the south at a junction with U.S. Highway 36 at Anton and proceeds north through remote, sparsely populated land for roughly 29 miles (47 km) before reaching a junction with U.S. Highway 34 at Akron. From there, the route continues north for a further 24 miles (39 km) to cross Interstate 76 at that highway's exit 115 and after roughly four more miles arrives at its northern terminus at U.S. Highway 6 in Atwood.

== History ==
SH 63 was defined in the 1920s by the Colorado Department of Transportation, when it connected State Highway 96 in Haswell to Atwood at U.S. Highway 6. A gap appeared near Haswell in 1946. The section was later deleted by 1954, leaving its current routing from Anton to Atwood. This section was paved by 1961.

== Major intersections ==
County	Location	mi	km	Destinations	Notes
Washington	Anton	0.000	0.000	US 36	Southern terminus
Washington	Akron	29.006	46.681	US 34 (1st Avenue) – Brush, Wray	
Logan		53.290	85.762	I-76	I-76 exit 115
Logan	Atwood	56.412	90.786	US 6 – Merino, Brush, Sterling	Northern terminus
1.000 mi = 1.609 km; 1.000 km = 0.621 mi
