= Rago, Colorado =

Unincorporated community in Washington County, CO, USA

- Unincorporated community
- Location within Colorado Location within the United States
- Coordinates: 40°00′07″N 103°24′56″W
- Country: United States
- State: Colorado
- County: Washington
- Elevation: 4,564 ft (1,391 m)
- Time zone: UTC-7 (Mountain (MST))
  - Summer (DST): UTC-6 (MDT)
- Area code: 970
- GNIS feature ID: 183014

Rago is an unincorporated community in Washington County, Colorado, United States.
