= Victor, Indiana =

- Unincorporated community
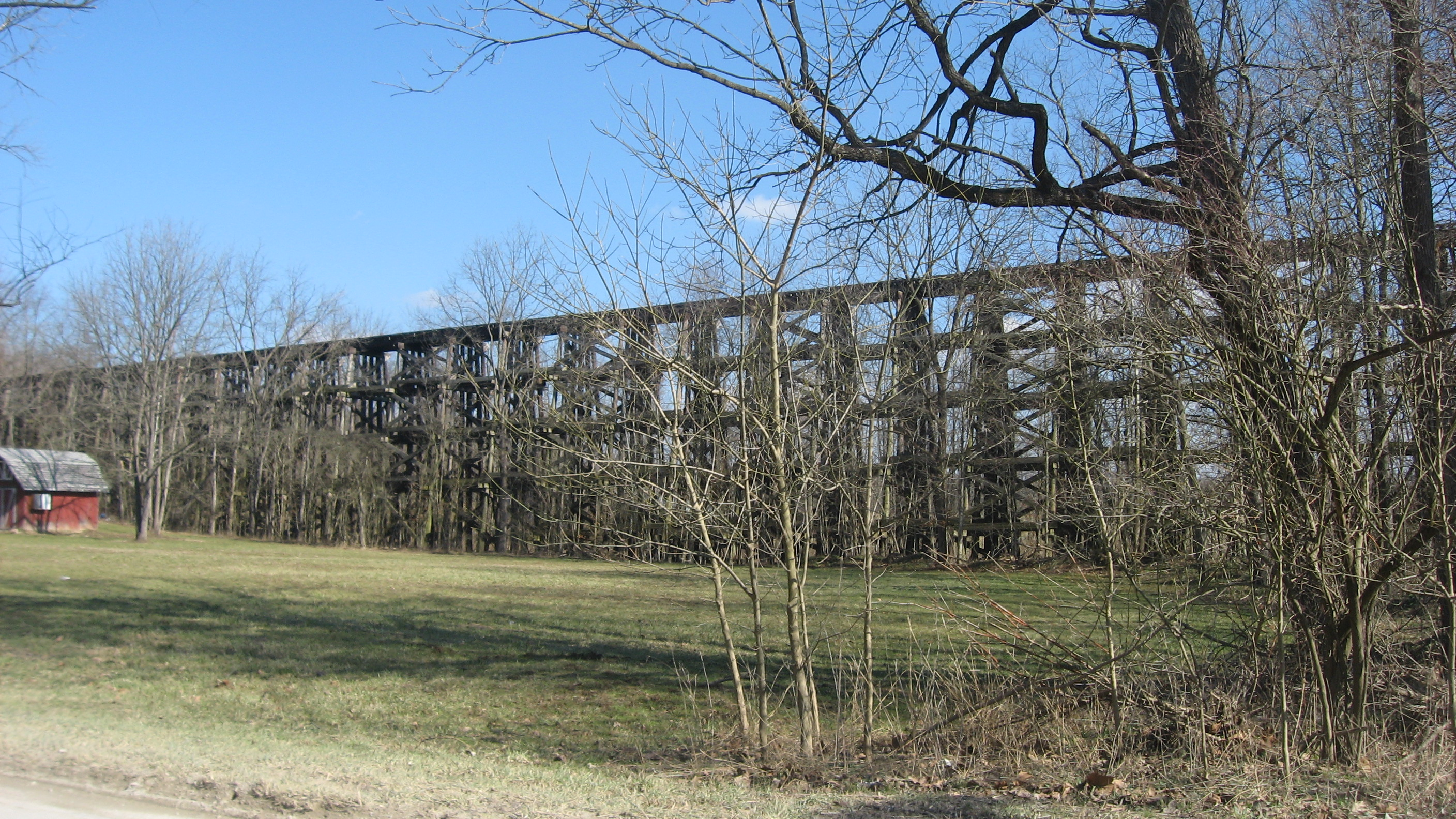
- Victor's imposing railroad trestle

- Location within Indiana Location within the United States
- Coordinates: 39°03′39″N 86°34′51″W
- Country: United States
- State: Indiana
- County: Monroe
- Township: Indian Creek
- Elevation: 656 ft (200 m)
- Time zone: UTC-5 (Eastern (EST))
  - Summer (DST): UTC-4 (EDT)
- ZIP code: 47403
- Area codes: 812, 930
- GNIS feature ID: 445274

Victor is an unincorporated community in Indian Creek Township, Monroe County, in the U.S. state of Indiana.

== History ==
Victor is the home of Victor Oolitic Stone Company, a limestone quarry and limestone fabricator in existence since 1898. A location between near Victor and Harrodsburg on Clear Creek was chosen by Col. John Ketcham for his home and grist mill.

== Geography ==
Victor is approximately 10 miles southwest of Bloomington and 8 miles northwest of Harrodsburg at the junction of W. Milton Road and S. Victor Pike.
