= Indian Creek Township, Monroe County, Indiana =

Indian Creek Township
- Township
- Location in Monroe County
- Coordinates: 39°02′12″N 86°38′20″W
- Country: United States
- State: Indiana
- County: Monroe

Government
  - Type: Indiana township

Area
  - Total: 35.1 sq mi (91 km^{2})
  - Land: 35.07 sq mi (90.8 km^{2})
  - Water: 0.03 sq mi (0.078 km^{2}) 0.09%
- Elevation: 771 ft (235 m)

Population (2020)
  - Total: 1,559
  - Density: 46.6/sq mi (18.0/km^{2})
- Time zone: UTC-5 (Eastern (EST))
  - Summer (DST): UTC-4 (EDT)
- ZIP codes: 47403, 47462
- Area codes: 812, 930
- GNIS feature ID: 453426

Indian Creek Township is one of eleven townships in Monroe County, Indiana, United States. As of the 2010 census, its population was 1,634 and it contained 681 housing units.

== History ==
The John F. and Malissa Koontz House was listed on the National Register of Historic Places in 2014.

== Geography ==
According to the 2010 census, the township has a total area of 35.1 square miles (91 km^{2}), of which 35.07 square miles (90.8 km^{2}) (or 99.91%) is land and 0.03 square miles (0.078 km^{2}) (or 0.09%) is water.

=== Unincorporated towns ===
- Buenavista at 39.033103°N 86.655556°W
- Kirksville at 39.045881°N 86.613054°W
- Victor at 39.060881°N 86.580831°W

(This list is based on USGS data and may include former settlements.)

=== Cemeteries ===
According to local historical records the township contains 25 cemeteries, some dating back to the late 1830s.

== School districts ==
- Monroe County Community School Corporation

== Political districts ==
- Indiana's 4th congressional district
- State House District 60
- State Senate District 44
