= The Amityville Horror (disambiguation) =

The Amityville Horror is a 1977 book by Jay Anson.

The Amityville Horror may also refer to:

- The Amityville Horror (1979 film)
- The Amityville Horror (2005 film), a remake of the 1979 film

== See also ==
- Works based on the Amityville haunting
