= Buenavista, Indiana =

- Unincorporated community
- Location within Indiana Location within the United States
- Coordinates: 39°01′59″N 86°39′20″W
- Country: United States
- State: Indiana
- County: Monroe
- Township: Indian Creek
- Elevation: 705 ft (215 m)
- Time zone: UTC-5 (Eastern (EST))
  - Summer (DST): UTC-4 (EDT)
- ZIP code: 47403
- Area codes: 812, 930
- GNIS feature ID: 452229

Buenavista is an unincorporated community in Indian Creek Township, Monroe County, in the U.S. state of Indiana.

== History ==
Buenavista was platted in 1849. A post office was established at Buenavista in 1873, and remained in operation until it was discontinued in 1925.

In 1890, the population was 50 residents. By 1920, the population was 75. The population was 150 in 1930.
