= Jacks Defeat Creek =

Stream in Monroe County, Indiana, U.S.

Coordinates: 39°18′49″N 86°38′14″W

Jacks Defeat Creek is a stream in Monroe County, Indiana, in the United States. It is a tributary of Beanblossom Creek.

Jacks Defeat Creek was so named from an incident when two men, Jack Storm and Jack Ketcham were crossing the creek on horseback and both became stuck in the mud. An alternative for the name, is that it is an English bastardization of the name of the first settler along the creek, Jacque LaFitte. The French had presence in Vincennes, Kaskaskia and Detroit with land travel across Indiana. The alternative name for the creek, if correct, fits with the presence of the French briefly in the area after Vincennes was founded in the 1730s until the French were driven out in the French and Indian War.

== See also ==
- List of rivers of Indiana
