= Kirksville, Indiana =

- Unincorporated community
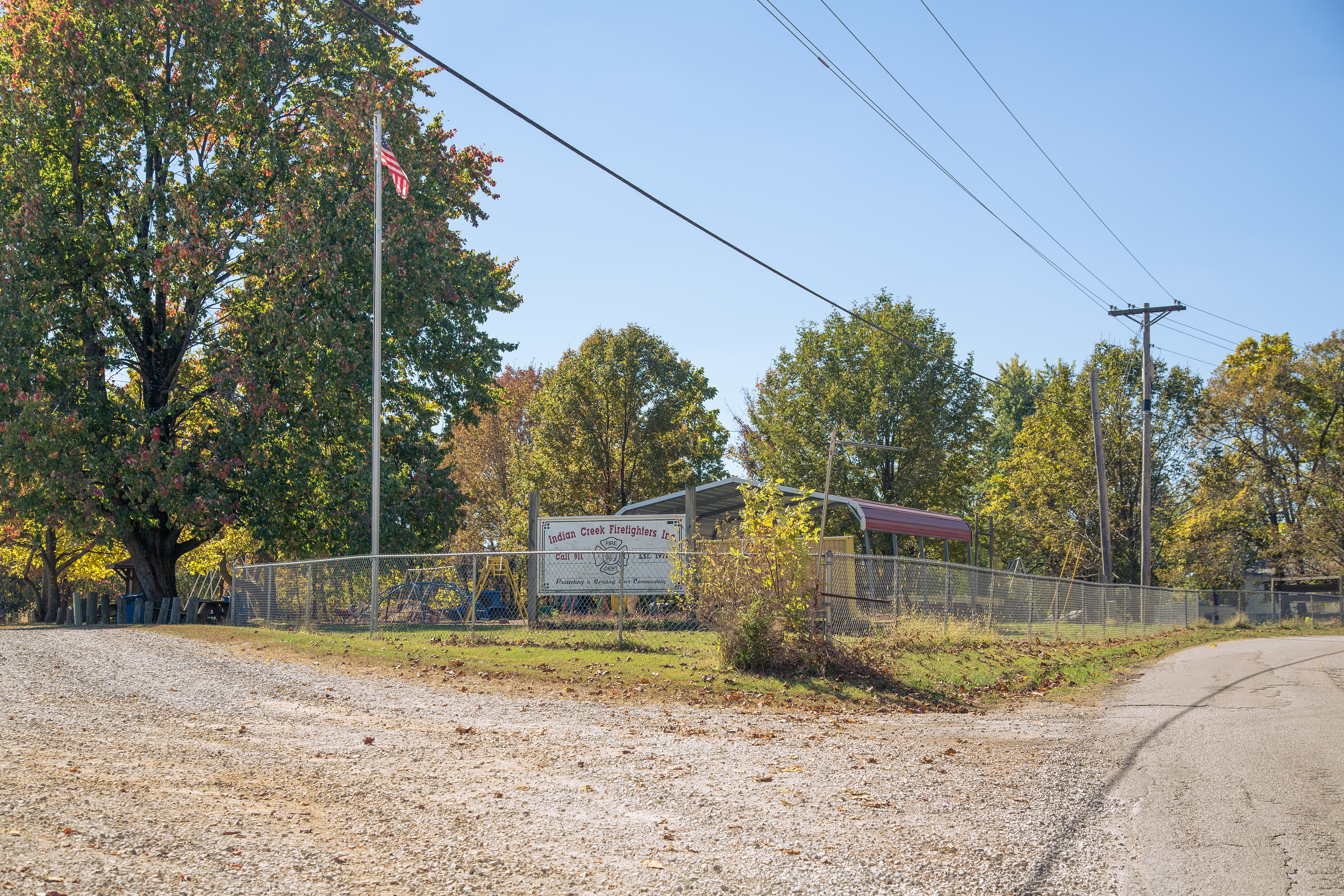

- Location within Indiana Location within the United States
- Coordinates: 39°02′45″N 86°36′47″W
- Country: United States
- State: Indiana
- County: Monroe
- Township: Indian Creek
- Elevation: 863 ft (263 m)
- Time zone: UTC-5 (Eastern (EST))
  - Summer (DST): UTC-4 (EDT)
- ZIP code: 47403
- Area codes: 812, 930
- FIPS code: 18-39996
- GNIS feature ID: 437361

Kirksville is an unincorporated community in Indian Creek Township, Monroe County, in the U.S. state of Indiana.

== History ==
A post office was established at Kirksville in 1879, and remained in operation until 1905. The community was named for the Kirk family, who operated a store. Country music singer Junior Brown grew up near Kirksville.
