= Woodrow, Colorado =

Unincorporated community in Washington County, CO, USA

- Unincorporated community
- Location in Washington County and the state of Colorado Woodrow, Colorado (the United States)
- Coordinates: 39°59′18″N 103°35′30″W
- Country: United States
- State: Colorado
- County: Washington County
- Elevation: 4,492 ft (1,369 m)
- Time zone: UTC-7 (MST)
  - Summer (DST): UTC-6 (MDT)
- ZIP code: 80757
- GNIS feature ID: 183049

Woodrow is an unincorporated community in Washington County, Colorado, United States. It has a U.S. Post Office with the ZIP Code 80757.

The post office at Woodrow has been in operation since 1913. The community was named after Woodrow Wilson, 28th President of the United States.
