= Washington County, Colorado =

County in Colorado, United States

- County
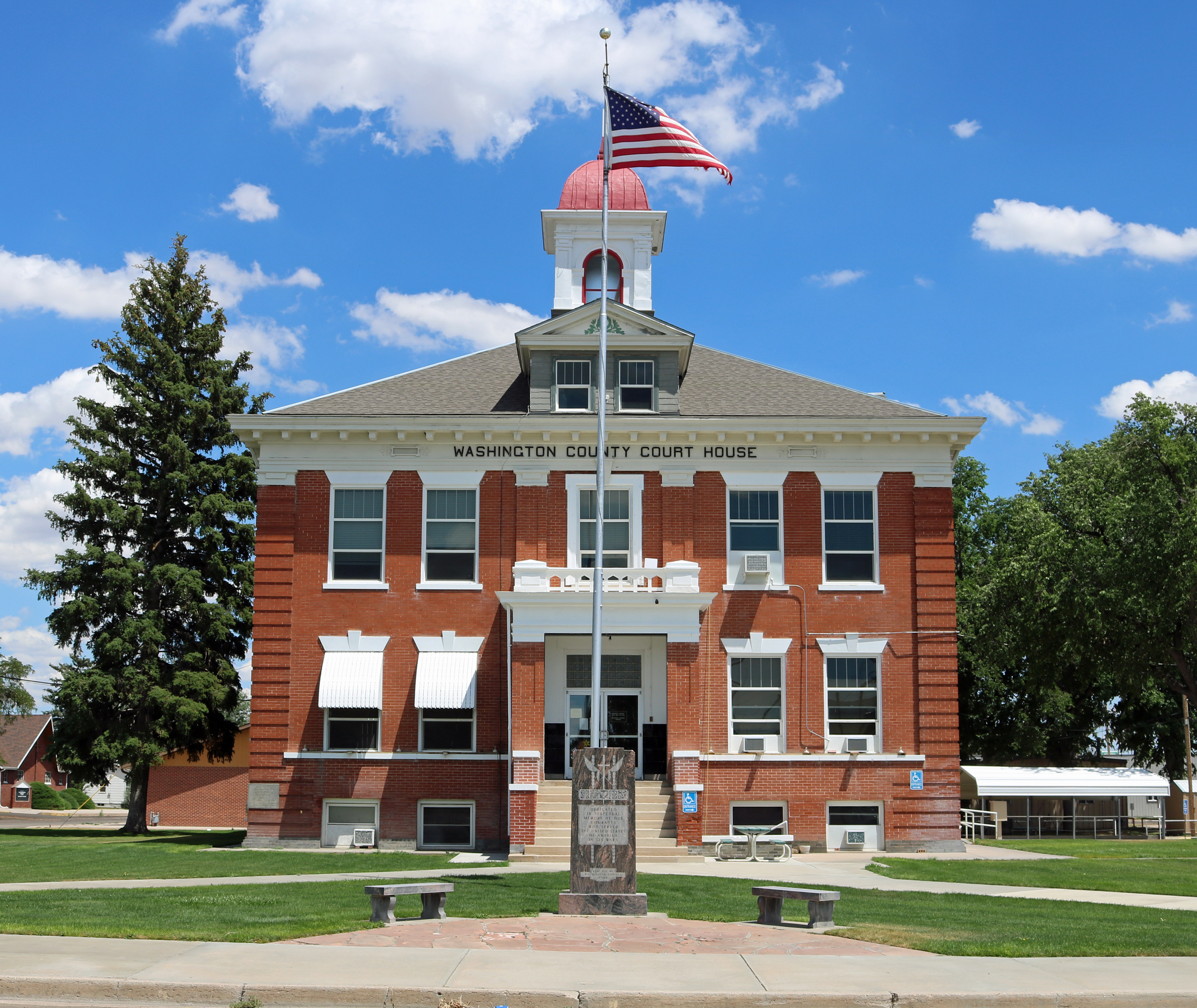
- The old Washington County Courthouse in Akron

- Location within the U.S. state of Colorado
- Coordinates: 39.98°N 103.20°W
- Country: United States
- State: Colorado
- Founded: February 9, 1887
- Named for: George Washington
- Seat: Akron
- Largest town: Akron

Area
  - Total: 2,524 sq mi (6,540 km^{2})
  - Land: 2,518 sq mi (6,520 km^{2})
  - Water: 5.9 sq mi (15 km^{2}) 0.2%

Population (2020)
  - Total: 4,817
  - Estimate (2025): 4,732 ▼
  - Density: 1.913/sq mi (0.7386/km^{2})
- Time zone: UTC−7 (Mountain)
  - Summer (DST): UTC−6 (MDT)
- Congressional district: 4th
- Website: washingtoncounty.colorado.gov

Washington County is a county located in the eastern side of the U.S. state of Colorado. As of the 2020 census, the population was 4,817, making it the least populous "Washington County" in the United States. The county seat is Akron. The county was named in honor of the United States President George Washington.

== History ==
Colorado State Legislature made Washington County out of larger Weld County in 1887. In 1889, Washington County's eastern half formed Yuma County. In 1903, Arapahoe County ceded its eastern portion to Washington County to create its present form.

Like many counties in Eastern Colorado, The Great Depression affected Washington County, bringing its population down significantly. Recently growth has been stagnant.

Washington County's Eastern Colorado Roundup is home to Colorado's first home-owned carnival held on every July annually. There are activities such as rodeos, various rides, and animals to see.

== Geography ==
According to the U.S. Census Bureau, the county has a total area of 2,524 square miles (6,540 km^{2}), of which 2,518 square miles (6,520 km^{2}) is land and 5.9 square miles (15 km^{2}) (0.2%) is water.

=== Adjacent counties ===
- Logan County - northeast
- Yuma County - east
- Kit Carson County - southeast
- Lincoln County - southwest
- Adams County - west
- Arapahoe County - west
- Morgan County - northwest

=== Major highways ===
- Interstate 76
- I-76 BS
- U.S. Highway 34
- U.S. Highway 36
- State Highway 59
- State Highway 61
- State Highway 63
- State Highway 71

=== Trails and byways ===
- American Discovery Trail
- South Platte Trail

== Demographics ==
Historical population
Census	Pop.	Note	%±
1890	2,301		—
1900	1,241		−46.1%
1910	6,002		383.6%
1920	11,208		86.7%
1930	9,591		−14.4%
1940	8,336		−13.1%
1950	7,520		−9.8%
1960	6,625		−11.9%
1970	5,550		−16.2%
1980	5,304		−4.4%
1990	4,812		−9.3%
2000	4,926		2.4%
2010	4,814		−2.3%
2020	4,817		0.1%
2025 (est.)	4,732	▼	−1.8%
U.S. Decennial Census; 1790–1960 1900–1990; 1990–2000 2010–2020

=== 2020 census ===
As of the 2020 census, the county had a population of 4,817. Of the residents, 22.7% were under the age of 18 and 21.7% were 65 years of age or older; the median age was 42.5 years. For every 100 females there were 110.4 males, and for every 100 females age 18 and over there were 108.6 males. 0.0% of residents lived in urban areas and 100.0% lived in rural areas.

Washington County, Colorado – Racial and ethnic composition Note: the US Census treats Hispanic/Latino as an ethnic category. This table excludes Latinos from the racial categories and assigns them to a separate category. Hispanics/Latinos may be of any race.
Race / Ethnicity (NH = Non-Hispanic)	Pop 2000	Pop 2010	Pop 2020	% 2000	% 2010	% 2020
White alone (NH)	4,568	4,306	4,057	92.73%	89.45%	84.22%
Black or African American alone (NH)	2	30	24	0.04%	0.62%	0.50%
Native American or Alaska Native alone (NH)	15	7	8	0.30%	0.15%	0.17%
Asian alone (NH)	5	11	15	0.10%	0.23%	0.31%
Pacific Islander alone (NH)	1	1	10	0.02%	0.02%	0.21%
Other race alone (NH)	1	2	20	0.02%	0.04%	0.42%
Mixed race or Multiracial (NH)	24	50	167	0.49%	1.04%	3.47%
Hispanic or Latino (any race)	310	407	516	6.29%	8.45%	10.71%
Total	4,926	4,814	4,817	100.00%	100.00%	100.00%

The racial makeup of the county was 87.8% White, 0.7% Black or African American, 0.4% American Indian and Alaska Native, 0.4% Asian, 0.3% Native Hawaiian and Pacific Islander, 3.3% from some other race, and 7.1% from two or more races. Hispanic or Latino residents of any race comprised 10.7% of the population.

There were 1,933 households in the county, of which 27.1% had children under the age of 18 living with them and 20.1% had a female householder with no spouse or partner present. About 30.5% of all households were made up of individuals and 15.1% had someone living alone who was 65 years of age or older.

There were 2,276 housing units, of which 15.1% were vacant. Among occupied housing units, 73.8% were owner-occupied and 26.2% were renter-occupied. The homeowner vacancy rate was 2.3% and the rental vacancy rate was 11.5%.

=== 2000 census ===
At the 2000 census there were 4,926 people in 1,989 households, including 1,408 families, in the county. The population density was 2 people per square mile (0.77 people/km^{2}). There were 2,307 housing units at an average density of 1 units per square mile (0.39 units/km^{2}). The racial makeup of the county was 96.39% White, 0.04% Black or African American, 0.57% Native American, 0.10% Asian, 0.02% Pacific Islander, 2.03% from other races, and 0.85% from two or more races. 6.29% of the population were Hispanic or Latino of any race. Of the 1,989 households 31.30% had children under the age of 18 living with them, 60.70% were married couples living together, 6.40% had a female householder with no husband present, and 29.20% were non-families. 26.20% of households were one person and 11.60% were one person aged 65 or older. The average household size was 2.46 and the average family size was 2.97.

The age distribution was 26.50% under the age of 18, 6.30% from 18 to 24, 24.80% from 25 to 44, 24.20% from 45 to 64, and 18.20% 65 or older. The median age was 40 years. For every 100 females there were 103.40 males. For every 100 females age 18 and over, there were 100.10 males.

The median household income was $32,431 and the median family income was $37,287. Males had a median income of $26,225 versus $21,558 for females. The per capita income for the county was $17,788. About 8.60% of families and 11.40% of the population were below the poverty line, including 16.30% of those under age 18 and 9.40% of those age 65 or over.

== Communities ==
=== Towns ===
- Akron
- Otis

=== Census-designated places ===
- Cope

=== Unincorporated communities ===
- Anton
- Last Chance
- Lindon
- Platner
- Rago
- Thurman
- Woodrow

=== Ghost towns ===
- Messex
- Pinneo

== Politics ==
Like all of the High Plains, Washington is a powerfully Republican county in Presidential elections. Among Colorado counties only Washington, Elbert and Hinsdale were carried by Barry Goldwater in 1964, and no Democratic presidential nominee has carried Washington County since Franklin Delano Roosevelt in 1936. The last five Republican presidential candidates have all obtained over 75 percent of Washington County's vote.

United States presidential election results for Washington County, Colorado
Year	Republican		Democratic		Third party(ies)	
Year	No.	%	No.	%	No.	%
1888	810	59.12%	505	36.86%	55	4.01%
1892	250	62.97%	0	0.00%	147	37.03%
1896	222	53.75%	177	42.86%	14	3.39%
1900	312	59.77%	191	36.59%	19	3.64%
1904	460	66.47%	191	27.60%	41	5.92%
1908	599	57.10%	424	40.42%	26	2.48%
1912	361	18.34%	765	38.87%	842	42.78%
1916	989	34.13%	1,748	60.32%	161	5.56%
1920	2,117	63.44%	1,060	31.77%	160	4.79%
1924	1,851	54.27%	720	21.11%	840	24.63%
1928	2,132	69.99%	851	27.94%	63	2.07%
1932	1,385	35.39%	2,378	60.77%	150	3.83%
1936	1,723	44.34%	2,071	53.29%	92	2.37%
1940	2,390	62.63%	1,403	36.77%	23	0.60%
1944	2,259	67.88%	1,058	31.79%	11	0.33%
1948	1,636	55.31%	1,304	44.08%	18	0.61%
1952	2,398	69.65%	1,009	29.31%	36	1.05%
1956	2,020	65.20%	1,067	34.44%	11	0.36%
1960	1,979	65.49%	1,039	34.38%	4	0.13%
1964	1,434	51.60%	1,341	48.25%	4	0.14%
1968	1,634	60.92%	694	25.88%	354	13.20%
1972	1,837	69.87%	643	24.46%	149	5.67%
1976	1,440	52.63%	1,211	44.26%	85	3.11%
1980	2,007	71.40%	568	20.21%	236	8.40%
1984	2,080	77.50%	568	21.16%	36	1.34%
1988	1,707	62.87%	958	35.29%	50	1.84%
1992	1,266	48.45%	660	25.26%	687	26.29%
1996	1,566	64.18%	649	26.60%	225	9.22%
2000	1,878	76.81%	477	19.51%	90	3.68%
2004	2,050	81.03%	455	17.98%	25	0.99%
2008	1,949	77.56%	529	21.05%	35	1.39%
2012	2,076	80.12%	468	18.06%	47	1.81%
2016	2,299	84.12%	296	10.83%	138	5.05%
2020	2,595	86.27%	369	12.27%	44	1.46%
2024	2,436	86.81%	329	11.72%	41	1.46%

United States Senate election results for Washington County, Colorado2
Year	Republican		Democratic		Third party(ies)	
Year	No.	%	No.	%	No.	%
2020	2,617	87.35%	346	11.55%	33	1.10%

United States Senate election results for Washington County, Colorado3
Year	Republican		Democratic		Third party(ies)	
Year	No.	%	No.	%	No.	%
2022	1,964	81.77%	347	14.45%	91	3.79%

Colorado Gubernatorial election results for Washington County
Year	Republican		Democratic		Third party(ies)	
Year	No.	%	No.	%	No.	%
2022	1,971	82.50%	314	13.14%	104	4.35%

In other statewide elections, Washington County also leans Republican, although the county was carried by Democrat Roy Romer by a narrow margin in 1990 – when he carried all but three counties statewide – by Dick Lamm in 1982 and by Constitution Party candidate Tom Tancredo in 2010.

== Education ==
There are 5 school districts in Washington County:

- Akron R-1
- Arickaree R-2
- Lone Star 101
- Otis R-3
- Woodlin R-104.

Akron R-1 includes:

- Akron High School

Arickaree R-2 includes:

- Arickaree School (all grades K-12)

Lone Star 101 includes:

- Lone Star School (all grades K-12)

Otis R-3 includes:

- Otis Elementary School
- Otis Jr.-Sr. High School

== See also ==
- Bibliography of Colorado
- Geography of Colorado
- History of Colorado
  - National Register of Historic Places listings in Washington County, Colorado
- Index of Colorado-related articles
- List of Colorado-related lists
  - List of counties in Colorado
- Outline of Colorado
