= Anton, Colorado =

Unincorporated community in Washington County, Colorado, United States

- unincorporated community
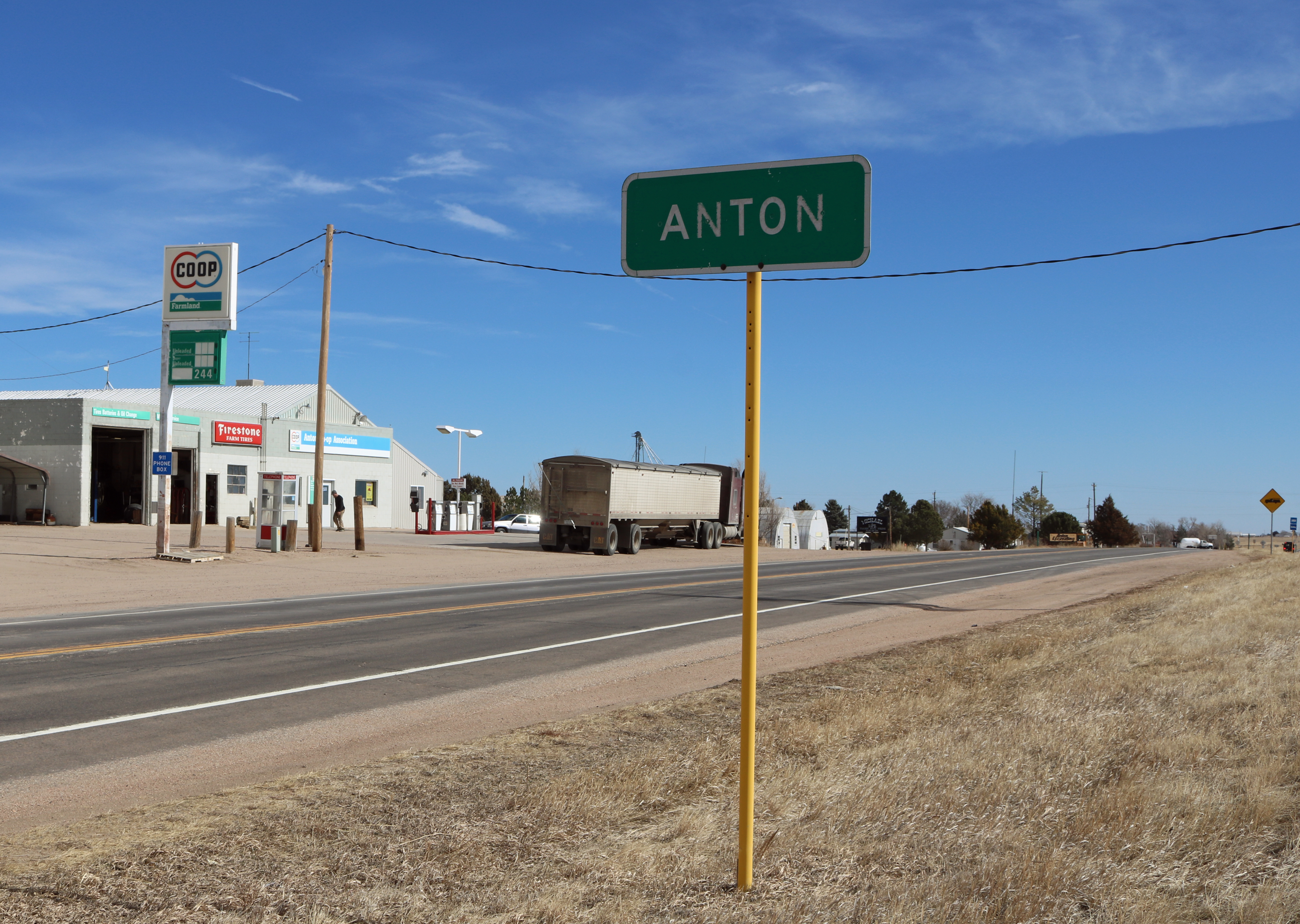
- Anton in 2017

- Location of Anton, Colorado. Anton (Colorado)
- Coordinates: 39°44′30″N 103°13′02″W
- Country: United States
- State: Colorado
- County: Washington
- Established: About 1915

Government
  - Type: unincorporated community
  - Body: Washington County
- Elevation: 4,869 ft (1,484 m)
- Time zone: UTC−07:00 (MST)
  - Summer (DST): UTC−06:00 (MDT)
- ZIP code: 80801
- GNIS place ID: 195021

Anton is an unincorporated community and U.S. Post Office in Washington County, Colorado, United States.

== History ==
Anton was established about 1915. The Anton, Colorado, post office opened on July 18, 1916.

== See also ==
- List of populated places in Colorado
- List of post offices in Colorado
