= Akron, Colorado =

Statutory town and seat of Washington County, Colorado, United States

- statutory town
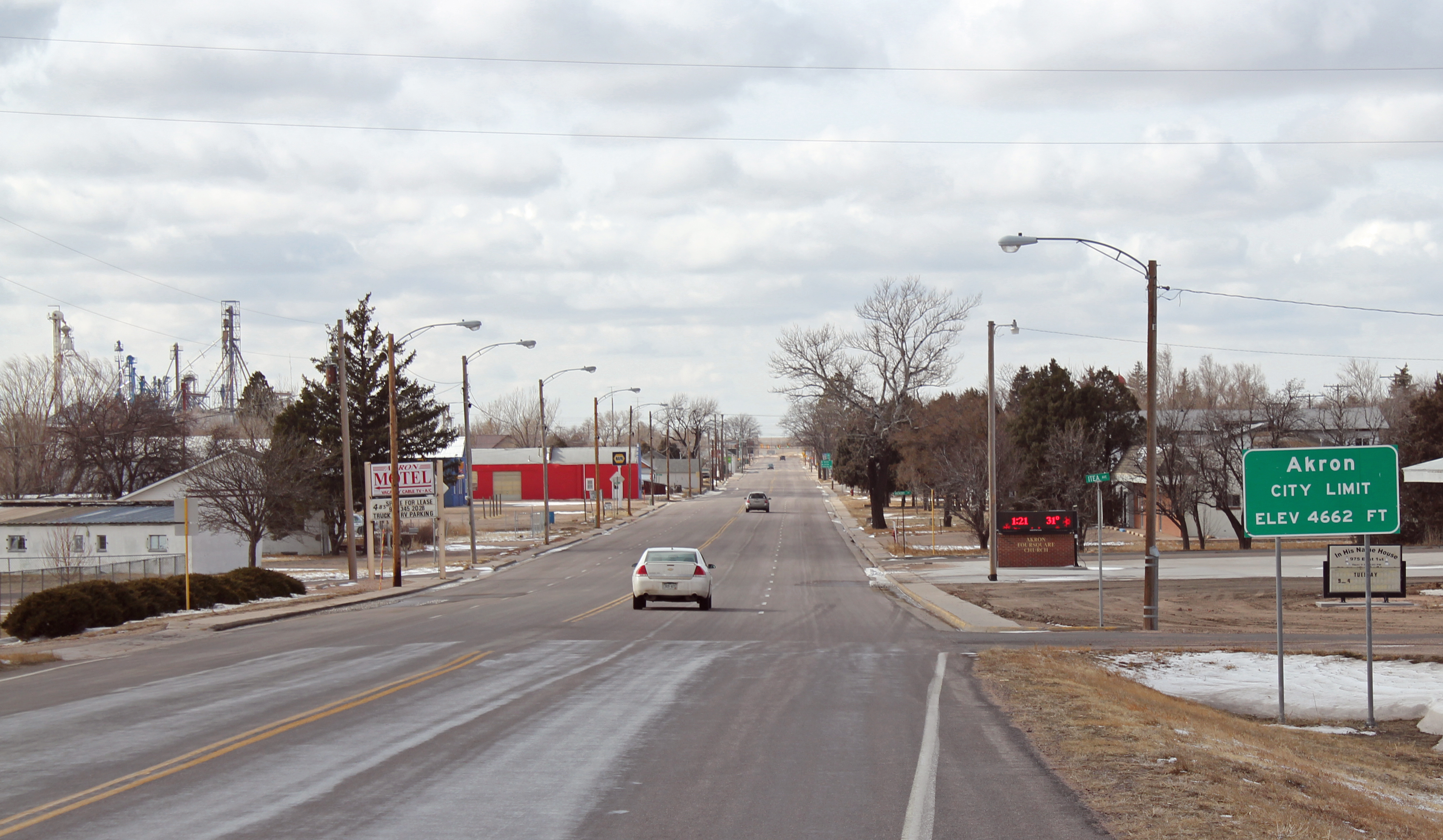
- Entering Akron from the east (2013)

- Location within Washington County and Colorado
- Coordinates: 40°09′48″N 103°13′13″W
- Country: United States
- State: Colorado
- County: Washington County
- Incorporated: September 22, 1887

Government
  - Type: statutory town

Area
  - Total: 2.77 sq mi (7.18 km^{2})
  - Land: 2.77 sq mi (7.18 km^{2})
  - Water: 0 sq mi (0.00 km^{2})
- Elevation: 4,679 ft (1,426 m)

Population (2020)
  - Total: 1,757
  - Density: 634/sq mi (244.7/km^{2})
- Time zone: UTC−07:00 (MST)
  - Summer (DST): UTC−06:00 (MDT)
- ZIP code: 80720
- Area code: 970
- GNIS town ID: 2412340
- FIPS code: 08-00925
- Website: Town website

Akron is the statutory town that is the county seat of and the most populous municipality in Washington County, Colorado, United States. The town population was 1,757 at the 2020 United States census.

== History ==
Akron was platted in 1882. Originally, Akron was a small camp on the railroad, being halfway between McCook and Denver. The community was named after Akron, Ohio, the native home of the wife of a railroad employee. The Akron, Colorado, post office opened on January 30, 1883. Washington County was created on February 9, 1887, with Akron as its first and only seat. The Town of Akron was incorporated on September 22, 1887.

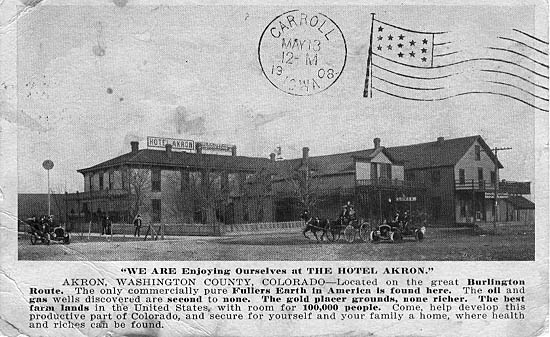
Hotel Akron, from a postcard sent in 1908

== Geography ==
Akron is located at the intersection of U.S. Highway 34 and State Highway 63.

At the 2020 United States census, the town had a total area of 1,774 acres (7.180 km^{2}), all of it land.

=== Climate ===
Akron experiences a semi-arid climate (Köppen BSk) with cold, dry winters and hot, dry summers.

Climate data for Akron, Colorado (Colorado Plains Regional Airport), 1991–2020 normals, extremes 1937–present
Month	Jan	Feb	Mar	Apr	May	Jun	Jul	Aug	Sep	Oct	Nov	Dec	Year
Record high °F (°C)	74 (23)	78 (26)	85 (29)	91 (33)	97 (36)	107 (42)	107 (42)	109 (43)	100 (38)	91 (33)	82 (28)	80 (27)	109 (43)
Mean maximum °F (°C)	61.2 (16.2)	65.5 (18.6)	75.7 (24.3)	82.2 (27.9)	89.2 (31.8)	96.9 (36.1)	99.9 (37.7)	97.6 (36.4)	93.8 (34.3)	84.8 (29.3)	73.0 (22.8)	62.3 (16.8)	100.9 (38.3)
Mean daily maximum °F (°C)	41.1 (5.1)	43.5 (6.4)	54.1 (12.3)	60.9 (16.1)	70.5 (21.4)	82.5 (28.1)	88.7 (31.5)	86.5 (30.3)	78.3 (25.7)	63.8 (17.7)	50.9 (10.5)	41.1 (5.1)	63.5 (17.5)
Daily mean °F (°C)	29.1 (−1.6)	31.3 (−0.4)	40.5 (4.7)	47.2 (8.4)	56.9 (13.8)	68.2 (20.1)	74.5 (23.6)	72.5 (22.5)	64.1 (17.8)	50.2 (10.1)	38.3 (3.5)	29.3 (−1.5)	50.2 (10.1)
Mean daily minimum °F (°C)	17.2 (−8.2)	19.0 (−7.2)	26.8 (−2.9)	33.5 (0.8)	43.4 (6.3)	53.8 (12.1)	60.3 (15.7)	58.5 (14.7)	49.9 (9.9)	36.6 (2.6)	25.8 (−3.4)	17.5 (−8.1)	36.9 (2.7)
Mean minimum °F (°C)	−3.8 (−19.9)	−0.5 (−18.1)	9.3 (−12.6)	17.9 (−7.8)	29.4 (−1.4)	43.2 (6.2)	51.7 (10.9)	48.9 (9.4)	35.9 (2.2)	18.9 (−7.3)	6.6 (−14.1)	−2.9 (−19.4)	−10.4 (−23.6)
Record low °F (°C)	−28 (−33)	−29 (−34)	−21 (−29)	−3 (−19)	19 (−7)	28 (−2)	38 (3)	39 (4)	17 (−8)	0 (−18)	−11 (−24)	−25 (−32)	−29 (−34)
Average precipitation inches (mm)	0.17 (4.3)	0.20 (5.1)	0.71 (18)	1.43 (36)	2.65 (67)	2.24 (57)	2.78 (71)	2.36 (60)	1.24 (31)	0.99 (25)	0.42 (11)	0.20 (5.1)	15.39 (390.5)
Average snowfall inches (cm)	5.6 (14)	5.1 (13)	8.6 (22)	5.4 (14)	0.4 (1.0)	0.0 (0.0)	0.0 (0.0)	0.0 (0.0)	0.9 (2.3)	2.7 (6.9)	7.8 (20)	6.9 (18)	43.4 (111.2)
Average precipitation days (≥ 0.01 in)	3.2	3.4	5.4	8.6	10.7	9.6	10.4	9.2	6.2	6.0	4.1	2.8	79.6
Average snowy days (≥ 0.1 in)	3.9	4.1	4.9	2.7	0.3	0.0	0.0	0.0	0.5	1.7	4.4	4.1	26.6
Source 1: National Weather Service
Source 2: NOAA(average snowfall/snowy days 1981–2010)

== Demographics ==
Historical population
Census	Pop.	Note	%±
1890	559		—
1900	351		−37.2%
1910	647		84.3%
1920	1,401		116.5%
1930	1,135		−19.0%
1940	1,417		24.8%
1950	1,605		13.3%
1960	1,890		17.8%
1970	1,775		−6.1%
1980	1,716		−3.3%
1990	1,599		−6.8%
2000	1,711		7.0%
2010	1,702		−0.5%
2020	1,757		3.2%
U.S. Decennial Census

=== 2020 census ===
As of the 2020 census, Akron had a population of 1,757. The median age was 39.8 years. 21.9% of residents were under the age of 18 and 21.1% of residents were 65 years of age or older. For every 100 females there were 107.7 males, and for every 100 females age 18 and over there were 105.2 males age 18 and over.

0.0% of residents lived in urban areas, while 100.0% lived in rural areas.

There were 700 households in Akron, of which 27.0% had children under the age of 18 living in them. Of all households, 43.1% were married-couple households, 23.7% were households with a male householder and no spouse or partner present, and 27.6% were households with a female householder and no spouse or partner present. About 36.2% of all households were made up of individuals and 20.3% had someone living alone who was 65 years of age or older.

There were 827 housing units, of which 15.4% were vacant. The homeowner vacancy rate was 4.0% and the rental vacancy rate was 14.6%.

Racial composition as of the 2020 census
Race	Number	Percent
White	1,501	85.4%
Black or African American	22	1.3%
American Indian and Alaska Native	8	0.5%
Asian	6	0.3%
Native Hawaiian and Other Pacific Islander	5	0.3%
Some other race	68	3.9%
Two or more races	147	8.4%
Hispanic or Latino (of any race)	268	15.3%

=== 2000 census ===
At the 2000 census there were 1,711 people in 734 households, including 457 families, in the town. The population density was 1,179.3 inhabitants per square mile (455.3/km^{2}). There were 835 housing units at an average density of 575.5 per square mile (222.2/km^{2}). The racial makeup of the town was 93.51% White, 0.12% African American, 1.23% Native American, 0.12% Asian, 0.06% Pacific Islander, 4.32% from other races, and 0.64% from two or more races. Hispanic or Latino of any race were 11.75%.

Of the 734 households 29.3% had children under the age of 18 living with them, 50.8% were married couples living together, 9.4% had a female householder with no spouse present, and 37.7% were non-families. 33.8% of households were one person and 16.8% were one person aged 65 or older. The average household size was 2.28 and the average family size was 2.94.

The age distribution was 26.2% under the age of 18, 6.3% from 18 to 24, 23.4% from 25 to 44, 21.0% from 45 to 64, and 23.1% 65 or older. The median age was 40 years. For every 100 females, there were 97.3 males. For every 100 females age 18 and over, there were 89.8 males.

The median household income was $29,420 and the median family income was $35,156. Males had a median income of $25,875 versus $21,000 for females. The per capita income for the town was $15,772. About 8.1% of families and 11.0% of the population were below the poverty line, including 13.9% of those under age 18 and 11.3% of those age 65 or over.

== See also ==
- List of municipalities in Colorado
