= Tornado outbreak sequence of June 14–19, 2023 =

North American tornado outbreak

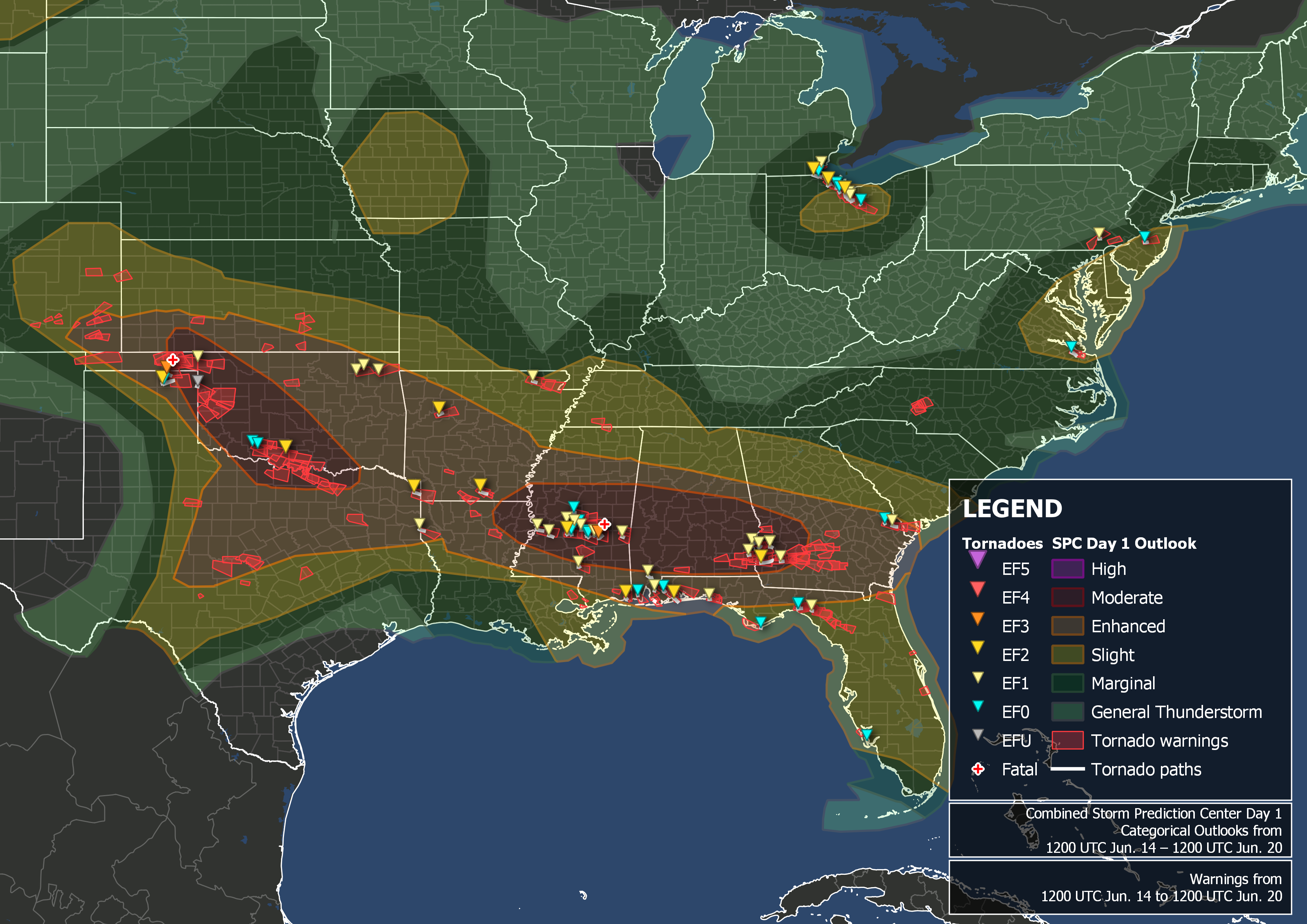
- Confirmed tornadoes and warnings from June 14–19, 2023

Meteorological history
- Duration: June 14–19, 2023

Tornado outbreak
- Tornadoes: 92
- Max. rating: EF3 tornado
- Highest winds: 150 mph (240 km/h) (Louin, Mississippi EF3 on June 18)
- Largest hail: 4.75 in (12.1 cm) near Caledonia, Mississippi on June 16

Overall effects
- Fatalities: 4 (+1 non-tornadic)
- Injuries: ~120
- Damage: $3.5 billion (2023 USD)
- Power outages: 1,005,000
- Part of the tornado outbreaks of 2023

A multi-day period of significant tornado and severe weather activity occurred across the Southern United States, Ohio Valley, and southern High Plains in mid-June 2023. Starting on June 14, tornadoes occurred in Texas, Alabama, and Georgia, where they caused large-scale damage to trees and structures. The tornado outbreak continued on June 15, where tornadoes occurred in five states, including one EF3 tornado which moved directly through the center of Perryton, Texas, causing major damage and three fatalities. More tornadoes touched down on June 16 in the southern and northeastern United States, including an unusual anticyclonic tornado in Mobile and Baldwin counties in Alabama, where the tornado itself was associated with the anticyclonic bookend vortex of a powerful mesoscale convective system. More tornadoes occurred on June 17 and 18, including another EF3 tornado near Louin, Mississippi that destroyed numerous homes and other buildings, killed one person, and injured twenty-five others. This outbreak sequence was unusual in the sense that it produced strong tornadoes in the Deep South in June, despite the region's peak tornado season being March through mid-May, along with the autumn months.

== Meteorological synopsis ==
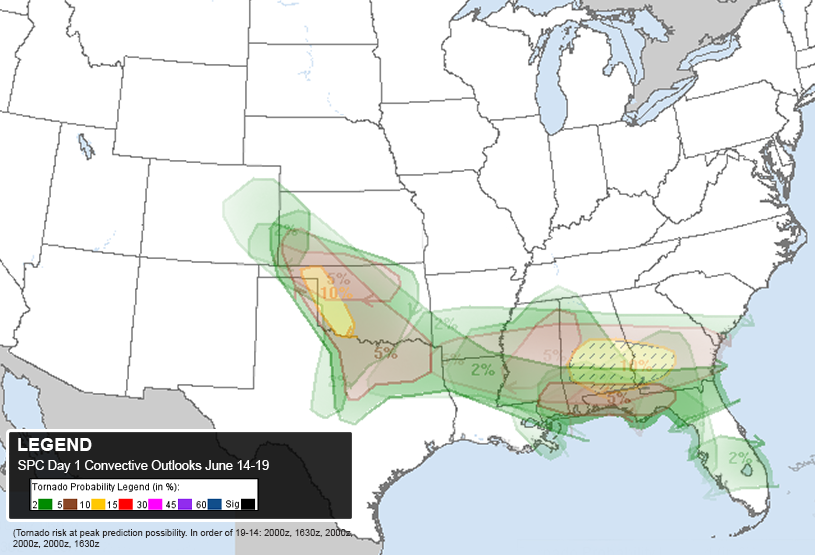
NWS Tornado outlooks from June 14–19 overlaid.

On June 12, the Storm Prediction Center (SPC) issued a level 3/enhanced risk of severe weather for June 14 across the Mid-South and eastern Gulf Coast states, and also highlighted the threat for significant severe weather across the risk area. Mid-level atmospheric flow was beginning to become broadly confluent, while a low pressure system situated north of the Great Lakes began to weaken and move east. Higher moisture content was confined to the south of a remnant surface front, and convective instability increased in the risk area due to the eastward advection of warm elevated mixed-layer air across the Mississippi River Valley. A 5 percent tornado risk was introduced in the SPC's Day 2 outlook for June 14 across Mississippi, Alabama, and Georgia, and also included a 30 percent risk for wind and hail, which the latter included a significant threat. In the morning hours of June 14, the SPC upgraded the enhanced risk to a moderate risk, and included a significant 10 percent risk for tornadoes across southeastern Alabama and southwestern Georgia, as well as a significant 45 percent risk for wind and a significant 30 percent risk for hail across the southern United States. A few hours later, tornado watches were issued for Alabama and Georgia, and a Particularly dangerous situation severe thunderstorm watch was issued for northeastern Louisiana, southeastern Arkansas, and Mississippi.

On June 15, the SPC released an outlook with a moderate risk of severe weather for portions of the High Plains. This outlook included a 10 percent risk for tornadoes along the panhandles of both Texas and Oklahoma. A shortwave trough began to move into the central U.S. Concurrently, an associated 80 kt upper-level jet moved into the southern plains. At the surface, a low area also deepened across the southern High Plains, the same area a prominent cold front was headed. Ahead of the front, surface heating and increasing low-level convergence promoted significant convection.

From June 16–19, the same mid-level trough associated with previous storms continued to rotate around the Mid-Atlantic. Short-wave perturbations related to convergent air movement between a 50kt jet and the strong trough displayed signs of strong storms across the deep south, from Arkansas to Alabama. 3000 J/kg of CAPE was also present, promoting rapid intensification of storms in evening hours. Extreme instability led to unexpected and explosive storm development on almost all dates of the outbreak sequence, sometimes resulting in tornadoes, hail, and wind damage well outside of areas outlined by the Storm Prediction Center. This included 12 tornadoes that occurred in a 0% risk area in Ohio on June 15, three of which were strong.

== Confirmed tornadoes ==
Confirmed tornadoes by Enhanced Fujita rating
EFU	EF0	EF1	EF2	EF3	EF4	EF5	Total
8	34	36	12	2	0	0	92

=== June 14 event ===
List of confirmed tornadoes – Wednesday, June 14, 2023 (Note: All dates are based on the local time zone where the tornado touched down; however, all times are in Coordinated Universal Time for consistency.)
EF#	Location	County / Parish	State	Start Coord.	Time (UTC)	Path length	Max width
EF1	SW of Morris	Clay, Quitman	GA	31.7663°N 85.0031°W	15:37–15:44	3.63 mi (5.84 km)	50 yd (46 m)
EF1	Numerous trees were snapped or uprooted. The tornado continued through areas that were inaccessible to the damage survey team.						
EF1	Abbeville	Henry	AL	31.5692°N 85.2818°W	15:40–15:55	2.14 mi (3.44 km)	160 yd (150 m)
EF1	A tornado struck the northwest side of Abbeville where an office building and two homes had substantial roof damage, one of which had siding torn off and sustained damage to its porch. Numerous trees were either snapped or uprooted, concrete memorial monuments were knocked over, and multiple outbuildings were destroyed as well.						
EF1	Southern Eufaula	Barbour	AL	31.8562°N 85.1877°W	17:09–17:20	3.89 mi (6.26 km)	350 yd (320 m)
EF1	This high-end EF1 tornado impacted the south edge of Eufaula where the side of a metal building was ripped off, a church was damaged, and buildings at an apartment complex had roofing material torn off. A log cabin style home was unroofed, other homes sustained less severe roof damage, and numerous trees were snapped or uprooted, one of which landed on and damaged a home. The tornado dissipated over Walter F. George Lake.						
EF2	E of Wright Patman Lake to NNE of Bloomburg	Cass	TX	33.24°N 94.22°W	17:43–17:54	8.92 mi (14.36 km)	500 yd (460 m)
EF2	This strong tornado first touched down on the eastern banks of Wright Patman Lake. A home had part of its roof blown off and an industrial building was heavily damaged with its roof and multiple walls being destroyed. Hundreds of large trees were snapped or uprooted and multiple vehicles were flipped on US 59 before the tornado dissipated near the Arkansas state line.						
EF2	SSW of Blakely to NE of Nicholasville	Early, Baker	GA	31.357°N 84.9454°W	18:04–18:41	18.88 mi (30.38 km)	700 yd (640 m)
EF2	Two homes sustained major roof damage, several large metal-framed sheds were destroyed, a barn collapsed, and a double-wide manufactured home lost its roof and some exterior walls. A few other homes and mobile homes were damaged to a lesser degree. A chain-link fence was damaged, a wooden fence was blown down, and many large trees were snapped or uprooted along the path. The tornado dissipated immediately after crossing into Baker County.						
EF1	NNW of Newton	Baker	GA	31.397°N 84.422°W	18:54–19:15	3.6 mi (5.8 km)	150 yd (140 m)
EF1	A pivot irrigation system was flipped and numerous trees were downed.						
EF0	NNW of Ashburn	Turner	GA	31.74°N 83.68°W	19:45–19:46	0.09 mi (0.14 km)	50 yd (46 m)
EF0	A storm spotter reported a brief tornado touchdown in a rural area. No damage was reported.						
EF1	N of Pachitla (2nd tornado)	Randolph	GA	31.7892°N 84.7104°W	21:40–21:43	3.26 mi (5.25 km)	50 yd (46 m)
EF1	A grain silo was partially destroyed, several houses and manufactured homes were damaged, and trees were damaged as well.						
EF1	N of Pachitla (1st tornado)	Randolph	GA	31.7995°N 84.709°W	21:40–21:43	1.36 mi (2.19 km)	50 yd (46 m)
EF1	A brief tornado damaged a church, a manufactured home, and the roof of a house. Several stands of trees were also damaged.						
EF0	ENE of Nashville	Berrien	GA	31.24°N 83.14°W	22:35–22:36	0.1 mi (0.16 km)	50 yd (46 m)
EF0	A brief tornado was spotted. No damage was reported.						
EF0	NE of Brooklet	Bulloch	GA	32.4125°N 81.6346°W	23:08–23:09	0.19 mi (0.31 km)	250 yd (230 m)
EF0	Several trees were snapped or uprooted by this brief tornado.						
EF1	Northern Guyton to S of Springfield	Effingham	GA	32.3572°N 81.438°W	23:27–23:35	7.04 mi (11.33 km)	280 yd (260 m)
EF1	A tornado snapped or uprooted numerous trees and removed small amounts of roof fascia and shingles from a few homes.						

=== June 15 event ===
List of confirmed tornadoes – Thursday, June 15, 2023
EF#	Location	County / Parish	State	Start Coord.	Time (UTC)	Path length	Max width
EF0	NE of Faxon	Comanche	OK	34.485°N 98.54°W	21:58–22:08	3.8 mi (6.1 km)	50 yd (46 m)
EF0	Trees and shingles were damaged by this weak tornado.						
EF2	S of Farnsworth to SSE of Perryton	Ochiltree	TX	36.1526°N 100.9489°W	22:02–22:35	17.35 mi (27.92 km)	200 yd (180 m)
EF2	An unusually strong and long-lived landspout tornado remained over mostly open grassland. It snapped power poles along SH 70, which was the basis for the low-end EF2 rating. Some prairie scrub brush was ripped out of the ground as well. The 2212 UTC EF0 tornado occurred simultaneously with this tornado.						
EF2	Northern Toledo to E of Harbor View	Lucas	OH	41.7296°N 83.5426°W	22:06–22:11	3.81 mi (6.13 km)	300 yd (270 m)
EF2	A strong tornado touched down in the northern part of Toledo, causing extensive damage in the Point Place neighborhood. The second floor of a medical laboratory building was mostly destroyed, an automotive business suffered major damage, and a storage barn collapsed. Windows were blown out of a strip mall and a gas station convenience store as well. Numerous power poles and large trees were snapped, some of which fell onto homes, power lines, and vehicles. The tornado lifted over the Maumee River.						
EF3	Perryton	Ochiltree	TX	36.4135°N 100.8302°W	22:06–22:17	6.31 mi (10.15 km)	880 yd (800 m)
EF3	3 deaths – see article on this tornado – 100 people were injured.						
EF1	Detroit Beach to SW of Estral Beach	Monroe	MI	41.9351°N 83.3316°W	22:09–22:18	4.77 mi (7.68 km)	400 yd (370 m)
EF1	This tornado touched down in Detroit Beach and moved northeast through Woodland Beach. Numerous trees and tree limbs were downed in both communities, some of which landed on cars and homes. Minor tree limb damage occurred near the Enrico Fermi Nuclear Generating Station before the tornado moved offshore and dissipated over Lake Erie.						
EF0	S of Geronimo	Cotton	OK	34.42°N 98.402°W	22:10–22:12	1.2 mi (1.9 km)	50 yd (46 m)
EF0	A weak tornado caused minor damage to barns and shingles.						
EFU	WNW of Duncan	Stephens	OK	34.536°N 98.127°W	22:11–22:13	0.5 mi (0.80 km)	50 yd (46 m)
EFU	Weather spotters reported a tornado that caused no damage.						
EF0	SSE of Farnsworth to SSE of Perryton	Ochiltree	TX	36.1412°N 100.9046°W	22:12–22:30	12.26 mi (19.73 km)	50 yd (46 m)
EF0	This landspout tornado, which occurred simultaneously with the 2202 UTC EF2 landspout tornado, remained over mostly open grassland as it tracked about a 1/2 mile (0.80 km) south of the stronger tornado. No damage was reported.						
EF0	E of Harbor View	Lucas	OH	41.6864°N 83.359°W	22:28–22:29	0.24 mi (0.39 km)	50 yd (46 m)
EF0	A waterspout developed over Maumee Bay and moved onshore as a tornado at Maumee Bay State Park, toppling several dead trees, snapping tree branches, and damaging a boardwalk.						
EF0	E of Empire City	Stephens	OK	34.416°N 97.958°W	22:34–22:36	0.8 mi (1.3 km)	200 yd (180 m)
EF0	A storm chaser observed a tornado. No damage was reported.						
EF1	Southwestern Comanche	Stephens	OK	34.364°N 97.99°W	22:37–22:38	0.5 mi (0.80 km)	20 yd (18 m)
EF1	A brief tornado formed and moved into the southwest side of Comanche. Trees were downed and outbuilding was damaged just outside of town, while an apartment building was damaged in town.						
EF2	S of Oak Harbor to SW of Lacarne	Ottawa	OH	41.4688°N 83.1457°W	22:49–22:58	3.44 mi (5.54 km)	200 yd (180 m)
EF2	A strong tornado damaged five homes, a couple of which were totally unroofed, including one that had its attached garage and second floor exterior walls ripped off. Barns and outbuildings were completely destroyed, debris was scattered across fields, and trees were twisted and snapped. A vehicle was damaged by flying debris, and as many as ten cattle were killed.						
EF1	NE of Lindsey	Sandusky	OH	41.4494°N 83.1558°W	22:57–22:58	0.15 mi (0.24 km)	100 yd (91 m)
EF1	A very brief tornado toppled seven trees, two of which landed on a home. One more tree was snapped at its base.						
EFU	NE of Sugden	Jefferson	OK	34.1107°N 97.9429°W	22:58–23:00	0.8 mi (1.3 km)	50 yd (46 m)
EFU	Storm chasers observed a tornado. No damage was reported.						
EF1	WNW of Loco	Stephens	OK	34.353°N 97.774°W	23:03–23:05	1.5 mi (2.4 km)	50 yd (46 m)
EF1	A tornado uprooted and snapped trees along its path.						
EF2	SE of Loco to NW of Healdton	Stephens, Jefferson	OK	34.299°N 97.653°W	23:16–23:29	4.1 mi (6.6 km)	1,000 yd (910 m)
EF2	A small, unanchored block foundation home and a mobile home were swept away and completely destroyed by this large and slow-moving tornado, and debris was scattered across a nearby field. A well-built home sustained considerable roof damage, a nearby detached garage had much of its roofing torn off, and several other homes had less severe roof and window damage. Multiple outbuildings were damaged or destroyed, many trees were snapped or uprooted, and power poles were snapped as well.						
EF0	NE of Vickery	Sandusky	OH	41.3867°N 82.922°W	23:19–23:20	0.33 mi (0.53 km)	50 yd (46 m)
EF0	A brief tornado partially removed the metal roof of an outbuilding, and metal roofing was thrown into a field. Shingles were torn off the roof of a home and a power pole was snapped.						
EF1	S of Higgins, TX	Lipscomb (TX), Ellis (OK)	TX, OK	36.076°N 100.018°W	23:29–23:36	4.76 mi (7.66 km)	200 yd (180 m)
EF1	Storm chasers documented a cone tornado that moved over open county grasslands before crossing into Oklahoma, where it caused damage to trees.						
EF0	Northern Bellevue	Sandusky	OH	41.2845°N 82.8514°W	23:40–23:42	0.93 mi (1.50 km)	50 yd (46 m)
EF0	A weak tornado downed several power poles, uprooted trees, and snapped large tree branches as it moved through the north side of Bellevue.						
EF0	St. George Island	Franklin	FL	29.6226°N 84.9496°W	23:43–23:48	0.44 mi (0.71 km)	50 yd (46 m)
EF0	A waterspout made landfall on the western end of Saint George Island, causing minor damage to a home.						
EFU	SW of Durham	Roger Mills	OK	35.796°N 99.978°W	23:47–23:50	1 mi (1.6 km)	50 yd (46 m)
EFU	A storm chaser reported a tornado. No known damage occurred.						
EF2	SSW of Monroeville to W of North Fairfield	Huron	OH	41.2172°N 82.7036°W	23:48–00:04	8.7 mi (14.0 km)	2,200 yd (2,000 m)
EF2	This large EF2 tornado heavily damaged several houses and was over a mile wide at times. One house was shifted off its foundation and had a garage wall blown out, while a car at another home was lifted and moved. Barns, outbuildings, and silos were heavily damaged or completely destroyed, and debris was scattered up to 0.25 miles (0.40 km) away. A piece of slate roofing was also torn off of a building and impaled into a tree, projectiles were left embedded in the ground, and a metal flag pole was completely bent over. Many trees were snapped, uprooted, or stripped of their limbs, and power poles were also snapped along the path.						
EF0	S of Monroeville	Huron	OH	41.1924°N 82.7052°W	23:51–23:54	1.64 mi (2.64 km)	100 yd (91 m)
EF0	A tree was uprooted and several large branches were snapped.						
EF0	W of North Fairfield	Huron	OH	41.1163°N 82.6608°W	00:01–00:02	0.66 mi (1.06 km)	100 yd (91 m)
EF0	Some tree damage occurred as a result of this brief, weak tornado.						
EF1	Eastern North Fairfield to W of Greenwich	Huron	OH	41.1406°N 82.6025°W	00:04–00:22	8.63 mi (13.89 km)	1,100 yd (1,000 m)
EF1	A large high-end EF1 tornado formed north of North Fairfield and moved south into town, where homes had roofing material torn off or were damaged by falling trees, a large sign was ripped off a building, and power and light poles were damaged. The most intense damage occurred outside of town, where a mobile home and the second floor of a two-story house were heavily damaged, and many trees and several power poles were snapped. Multiple silos were heavily damaged, outbuildings had their roofs removed, and an old barn collapsed.						
EF1	N of Greenwich	Huron	OH	41.0656°N 82.563°W	00:13–00:22	4.03 mi (6.49 km)	250 yd (230 m)
EF1	This tornado struck a grain facility at the beginning of its path, damaging or knocking over large metal silos and storage tanks. A small office building, an outbuilding, and some equipment was also damaged at this location. Damage along the remainder of the path was limited to downed trees and tree limbs.						
EF0	NE of Marietta	Love	OK	33.95°N 97.115°W	00:26–00:27	0.5 mi (0.80 km)	10 yd (9.1 m)
EF0	A research meteorologist observed a tornado that caused minor tree damage.						
EF0	NE of Nankin	Ashland	OH	40.9343°N 82.2738°W	00:47–00:49	1.24 mi (2.00 km)	300 yd (270 m)
EF0	The roof of a house was damaged, a barn lost part of its roof, and a chicken coop was damaged as well. An outbuilding had its walls and garage door pushed out, with insulation thrown into a field. In addition, several trees were downed, with their branches snapped.						
EF1	SE of Henrietta	Clay	TX	33.756°N 98.167°W	01:02–01:08	2.5 mi (4.0 km)	100 yd (91 m)
EF1	A large tree was downed, an outbuilding was destroyed, and one house suffered roof damage.						
EF2	West Pensacola to Pensacola Beach	Escambia, Santa Rosa	FL	30.4132°N 87.2725°W	01:35–02:08	8.58 mi (13.81 km)	450 yd (410 m)
EF2	This tornado was embedded in a larger area of straight-line wind damage, and first snapped trees and downed tree limbs as it moved southeastward along an intermittent path through West Pensacola and Warrington. Additional tree damage occurred at the Pensacola Country Club before it crossed Pensacola Bay, passing just west of Gulf Breeze. The tornado strengthened and then moved onshore at Pensacola Beach, inflicting significant damage to homes that were built to withstand major hurricanes. This included several homes that had siding and a substantial amount of roofing torn off, and several others that had garage doors blown in and destroyed, leading to the failure of exterior walls. One home that was under construction had its entire top floor and roof removed, and a large dumpster weighing several hundred pounds was tossed up to 70 yards (64 m). At least two boats were tossed, one of which was found 30 yards (27 m) from its boat lift, while the second was thrown an unknown distance into the water and then floated to Deer Point, which is located about 1 mile (1.6 km) away. The tornado then moved offshore into the Gulf of Mexico before dissipating.						

=== June 16 event ===
List of confirmed tornadoes – Friday, June 16, 2023
EF#	Location	County / Parish	State	Start Coord.	Time (UTC)	Path length	Max width
EF0	W of Loxley	Baldwin	AL	30.6182°N 87.7945°W	05:21–05:22	0.5 mi (0.80 km)	75 yd (69 m)
EF0	Intermittent tree damage occurred, including two trees that were uprooted. This tornado's path was slightly extended in July 2025.						
EF0	SE of Fanlew	Taylor	FL	30.175°N 83.897°W	05:43–05:45	0.97 mi (1.56 km)	50 yd (46 m)
EF0	A brief tornado touched down, causing tree damage.						
EF1	S of Panola, TX to NW of Keatchie, LA	Panola (TX), Caddo (LA)	TX, LA	32.2559°N 94.0744°W	06:15–06:25	7.73 mi (12.44 km)	844 yd (772 m)
EF1	This tornado caused widespread tree damage, including one tree that fell on a home.						
EF0	W of Hampton Springs	Taylor	FL	30.08°N 83.88°W	06:20–06:44	7.23 mi (11.64 km)	100 yd (91 m)
EF0	A well-defined TDS appeared on radar. Only tree damage occurred.						
EF0	ESE of St. Marks to SE of Fanlew	Jefferson, Taylor	FL	30.126°N 84.044°W	07:09–07:23	6.37 mi (10.25 km)	100 yd (91 m)
EF0	Trees were damaged.						
EF0	SE of Fanlew to SW of Iddo	Taylor	FL	30.16°N 83.88°W	07:30–07:41	3.42 mi (5.50 km)	75 yd (69 m)
EF0	A weak tornado damaged numerous trees.						
EF1	S of Perry	Taylor	FL	30.0829°N 83.594°W	07:45–07:50	1.26 mi (2.03 km)	80 yd (73 m)
EF1	A large metal building lost roof panels, a metal porch roof was torn off a house, and an outbuilding had its roof peeled back. An airplane was pushed sideways and moved at Perry–Foley Airport and a sign was also damaged. Trees were snapped and uprooted as well.						
EF1	Southern Vicksburg to W of Learned	Warren	MS	32.2456°N 90.9258°W	09:40–09:47	8.54 mi (13.74 km)	900 yd (820 m)
EF1	A high-end EF1 tornado snapped or uprooted numerous trees as it moved through wooded areas in southern Vicksburg. One large tree fell on a home.						
EF1	SE of Utica	Hinds	MS	32.0928°N 90.6178°W	09:54–10:02	6.54 mi (10.53 km)	800 yd (730 m)
EF1	Numerous trees were snapped or uprooted, and several utility poles and power lines were downed. The tornado may have been anticyclonic based on radar.						
EF1	E of Bucks to S of Stockton	Mobile, Baldwin	AL	31.02°N 87.98°W	12:59–13:08	8.48 mi (13.65 km)	200 yd (180 m)
EF1	A rare anticyclonic tornado snapped and uprooted multiple trees in the Mobile River valley. This tornado's path length was extended and its width was increased in July 2025.						
EF1	E of Compass to WNW of Wagontown	Chester	PA	40.0273°N 75.9052°W	15:10–15:14	1.8 mi (2.9 km)	250 yd (230 m)
EF1	Trees were snapped or uprooted and power lines were downed. Falling trees caused damage to a fence and caused a utility pole to snap.						
EF0	E of Buddtown to SE of New Lisbon	Burlington	NJ	39.9291°N 74.6873°W	16:55–17:01	3.4 mi (5.5 km)	200 yd (180 m)
EF0	A weak tornado snapped or uprooted multiple trees as it moved through a sparsely populated area. One tree fell on a power line.						
EFU	Clearwater Beach	Pinellas	FL	27.98°N 82.83°W	20:10	Unknown	Unknown
EFU	A waterspout moved ashore and injured two people.						
EF0	Smithfield to S of Bartlett	Isle of Wight, City of Suffolk	VA	36.988°N 76.648°W	20:36–20:58	8.46 mi (13.62 km)	100 yd (91 m)
EF0	This tornado touched down at the outskirts of Smithfield and moved directly through town, where large tree branches were downed and several homes had roof damage. The tornado continued southeastward through areas outside of town before it dissipated.						
EF0	S of Arriba	Lincoln	CO	39.2°N 103.27°W	22:29–22:30	0.01 yd (0.0091 m)	20 yd (18 m)
EF0	A brief tornado touched down over open country, causing no damage.						

=== June 17 event ===
List of confirmed tornadoes – Saturday, June 17, 2023
EF#	Location	County / Parish	State	Start Coord.	Time (UTC)	Path length	Max width
EF0	Irvington	Mobile	AL	30.4897°N 88.2385°W	05:21–05:28	3.91 mi (6.29 km)	80 yd (73 m)
EF0	The underskirt of two manufactured homes were damaged, and multiple trees and tree branches were snapped. The corner of a farm outbuilding was torn off and metal debris from the structure was thrown across a road.						
EF0	WNW of Thatcher	Las Animas	CO	37.72°N 104.45°W	21:50–21:53	2.04 mi (3.28 km)	10 yd (9.1 m)
EF0	A weak tornado was photographed and posted on social media. No damage occurred.						
EF0	NE of Elsanor	Baldwin	AL	30.6037°N 87.555°W	21:30–21:47	3.56 mi (5.73 km)	20 yd (18 m)
EF0	Some tree limbs were snapped by this weak tornado.						
EFU	SE of Turpin	Beaver	OK	36.7911°N 100.7865°W	23:08–23:12	2.22 mi (3.57 km)	50 yd (46 m)
EFU	A few storm spotters observed a tornado moving through open fields. No damage was found.						
EFU	NE of Rotan to NW of Hamlin	Stonewall	TX	32.9857°N 100.3701°W	23:18–23:49	4.29 mi (6.90 km)	50 yd (46 m)
EFU	Numerous storm chasers reported a tornado over open ranch land. No damage occurred.						
EFU	NW of Hamlin	Fisher	TX	32.92°N 100.21°W	23:45–23:55	1.04 mi (1.67 km)	50 yd (46 m)
EFU	A tornado was reported by local law enforcement.						
EF1	SW of Rosston to N of Laverne	Beaver, Harper	OK	36.7631°N 100.0189°W	00:42–00:50	8.48 mi (13.65 km)	300 yd (270 m)
EF1	This tornado damaged the roof of a home, a barn, power poles and trees.						
EFU	N of Burlington	Alfalfa	OK	36.914°N 98.422°W	02:24–02:25	1.5 mi (2.4 km)	30 yd (27 m)
EFU	A tornado remained primarily over cropland, possibly doing tree damage.						

=== June 18 event ===
List of confirmed tornadoes – Sunday, June 18, 2023
EF#	Location	County / Parish	State	Start Coord.	Time (UTC)	Path length	Max width
EF1	ENE of Collinsville to WSW of Foyil	Rogers	OK	36.392°N 95.763°W	05:40–05:52	10.9 mi (17.5 km)	1,000 yd (910 m)
EF1	A large tornado snapped and uprooted numerous trees, damaged multiple homes and outbuildings, and toppled numerous power poles.						
EF1	SW of Chelsea	Rogers	OK	36.518°N 95.565°W	05:56–06:03	5.2 mi (8.4 km)	800 yd (730 m)
EF1	Numerous trees were snapped or uprooted, and numerous power poles were toppled.						
EF1	S of Strang	Mayes	OK	36.391°N 95.170°W	06:09–06:15	4.1 mi (6.6 km)	300 yd (270 m)
EF1	Numerous trees were snapped or uprooted.						
EF2	Prairie View to S of Tokalon	Logan	AR	35.3259°N 93.552°W	06:12–06:17	5.4 mi (8.7 km)	700 yd (640 m)
EF2	A strong tornado impacted areas in and around the rural community of Prairie View, where five chicken houses were completely destroyed and multiple others sustained damage. One outbuilding was flattened and another had its roofing material removed. Roofing was ripped off a house, a two-car garage was blown off its foundation, and many trees were snapped or uprooted.						
EF0	S of Menifee	Perry	AR	35.0855°N 92.5485°W	07:12–07:13	0.2 mi (0.32 km)	60 yd (55 m)
EF0	The roofs of small outbuildings and homes were damaged. A chicken coop was blown apart, part of which was tossed into the window of a nearby manufactured home. A carport was blown sideways, and trees were damaged.						
EF0	Pine Island Center	Lee	FL	26.6086°N 82.1149°W	15:10–15:11	0.01 mi (0.016 km)	10 yd (9.1 m)
EF0	A brief tornado that was only on the ground for a few seconds damaged a recently constructed metal outdoor freezer.						
EF1	ENE of Quitman	Clarke	MS	32.0609°N 88.6577°W	15:54–15:57	2.01 mi (3.23 km)	150 yd (140 m)
EF1	A brief tornado snapped numerous tree branches and downed a few trees. A few trees were downed onto a home and a vehicle, and an outbuilding had a portion of its roof peeled back.						
EF0	ENE of Harrisburg	Linn	OR	44.3005°N 123.0673°W	20:30–20:32	0.3 mi (0.48 km)	150 yd (140 m)
EF0	A brief, weak tornado moved across I-5 before dissipating. No damage was reported.						
EF1	SW of Pocahontas	Randolph	AR	36.2184°N 91.0453°W	21:57–22:08	5 mi (8.0 km)	300 yd (270 m)
EF1	Multiple trees were snapped or uprooted and a large tree branch fell onto the roof of a house.						
EF0	N of Sharon	Madison	MS	32.7065°N 89.9481°W	00:38–00:40	1.65 mi (2.66 km)	250 yd (230 m)
EF0	A weak tornado snapped or uprooted multiple trees, damaged the metal roof of a home, and displaced a roof antenna.						
EF1	Ridgeland	Madison	MS	32.4296°N 90.1404°W	00:57–00:59	1.38 mi (2.22 km)	300 yd (270 m)
EF1	This tornado touched down in Ridgeland, where an old historic church collapsed after it was pushed off its foundation blocks, while a newer and more well-built church had shingle damage. A few homes also sustained shingle damage and tin was torn from a couple of businesses, some of which was thrown into power lines. A power pole was also downed and a fence was blown over.						
EF1	N of Morton	Scott	MS	32.4526°N 89.6347°W	01:04–01:18	6.48 mi (10.43 km)	350 yd (320 m)
EF1	Trees were snapped as this tornado moved through wooded areas.						
EF2	SE of Calion to NNE of Strong	Union	AR	33.2599°N 92.4481°W	01:15–01:42	10.31 mi (16.59 km)	1,320 yd (1,210 m)
EF2	A low-end EF2 tornado impacted a chicken farm, destroying three of the five chicken coops. Nearby barns and outbuildings were damaged as well, and numerous trees were snapped or uprooted. One tree fell on and damaged a manufactured home.						
EF1	Eastern Langford	Rankin	MS	32.3554°N 89.9352°W	01:29–01:37	2.05 mi (3.30 km)	300 yd (270 m)
EF1	Multiple trees were uprooted, a utility line was downed, and a home sustained shingle damage.						
EF0	N of Pelahatchie	Rankin	MS	32.3565°N 89.811°W	01:58–01:59	1.01 mi (1.63 km)	50 yd (46 m)
EF0	Minor tree damage occurred.						
EF2	SE of Florence	Rankin	MS	32.1226°N 90.1315°W	02:05–02:25	6.08 mi (9.78 km)	400 yd (370 m)
EF2	Several homes sustained minor to moderate roof damage, one of which also had its porch damaged. An outbuilding collapsed and many trees were downed, including numerous hardwood tree trunks that were snapped at low-end EF2 intensity in a wooded area. A fence around a basketball court was toppled as well.						
EF0	SSE of Florence	Rankin	MS	32.118°N 90.0166°W	02:21–02:23	0.92 mi (1.48 km)	100 yd (91 m)
EF0	A few trees were uprooted and tree limbs were broken.						
EF1	SSE of Pelahatchie to S of Morton	Rankin, Scott	MS	32.2446°N 89.7625°W	02:25–02:40	5.48 mi (8.82 km)	450 yd (410 m)
EF1	This tornado downed numerous trees and tree branches as it impacted wooded areas near the rural communities of Cross Roads and Cooperville.						
EF0	NW of Raleigh (1st tornado)	Smith	MS	32.0835°N 89.6099°W	03:23–03:24	0.5 mi (0.80 km)	100 yd (91 m)
EF0	Several trees were damaged or downed by this brief, weak tornado.						
EF0	NW of Raleigh (2nd tornado)	Smith	MS	32.0465°N 89.563°W	03:27–03:32	2.64 mi (4.25 km)	100 yd (91 m)
EF0	A few trees were downed and tree branches were broken.						
EF1	N of Sylvarena	Smith	MS	32.0911°N 89.4079°W	03:52–04:01	2.5 mi (4.0 km)	400 yd (370 m)
EF1	Numerous trees and a few home sustained minor damage. Multiple power lines were downed as well.						
EF1	NNW of Sylvarena	Smith	MS	32.0856°N 89.4027°W	03:59–04:12	4.53 mi (7.29 km)	800 yd (730 m)
EF1	Trees and tree limbs were downed.						
EF3	N of Bay Springs to ENE of Louin	Jasper	MS	32.0179°N 89.2884°W	04:29–04:48	6.46 mi (10.40 km)	1,350 yd (1,230 m)
EF3	1 death – See section on this tornado – 25 people were injured.						

=== June 19 event ===
List of confirmed tornadoes – Monday, June 19, 2023
EF#	Location	County / Parish	State	Start Coord.	Time (UTC)	Path length	Max width
EF1	Columbia	Marion	MS	31.2508°N 89.8261°W	13:49–13:53	1.96 mi (3.15 km)	200 yd (180 m)
EF1	A tornado touched down in Columbia and snapped or uprooted trees. One tree caused roof damage to a home upon falling, and many tree branches were downed as well.						
EF1	Miramar Beach	Walton	FL	30.3868°N 86.3288°W	16:16–16:21	1.62 mi (2.61 km)	200 yd (180 m)
EF1	This tornado touched down at a condominium complex in Miramar Beach, where a condo building had a storm shutter torn off and fencing was blown over at a tennis court. Several houses and a business sustained roof damage elsewhere in town, many trees and tree branches were downed, and fences were damaged or destroyed.						
EF1	WNW of Bon Secour	Baldwin	AL	30.341°N 87.791°W	18:00–18:09	1.64 mi (2.64 km)	230 yd (210 m)
EF1	A farm building with reinforced hurricane straps had its entire roof ripped off and wrapped around trees. A home's attached garage had about half of its roof removed, and multiple trees were snapped or uprooted. A small outbuilding was destroyed and another outbuilding was damaged.						
EF2	Moss Point	Jackson	MS	30.42°N 88.57°W	19:48–19:57	2.35 mi (3.78 km)	300 yd (270 m)
EF2	A high-end EF2 tornado caused significant damage as it moved through Moss Point, where numerous homes were damaged and some had roofs and exterior walls torn off. The Merchants & Marine Bank and the First Missionary Baptist Church were both severely damaged and had their roofs torn off, and some apartment buildings also sustained severe damage, one of which had its roof and some second floor exterior walls removed. Moss Point High School, Moss Point Vocational Center, and multiple businesses had considerable roof and exterior damage, detached garages were completely destroyed, and RVs were overturned. Many trees were snapped or uprooted in town, signs were destroyed, and power poles were snapped as well. Six people were injured.						

=== Perryton, Texas ===
Perryton, Texas
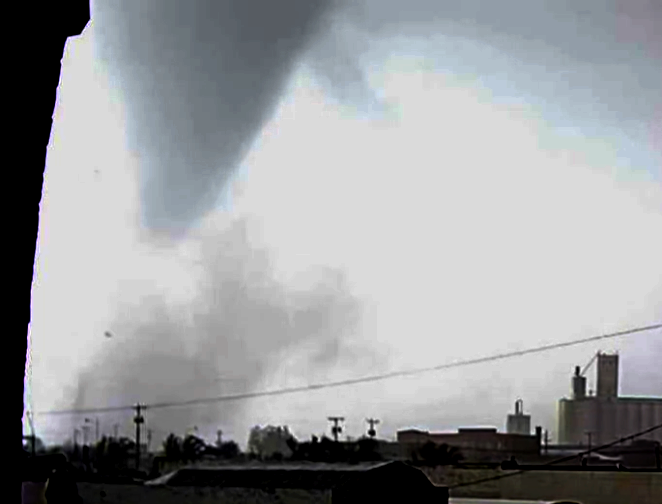
- The tornado seen from a sheriff's office

Meteorological history
- Formed: June 15, 2023, 5:06 p.m. CDT
- Dissipated: June 15, 2023, 5:17 p.m. CDT
- Duration: 11 minutes

EF3 tornado
- on the Enhanced Fujita scale
- Highest winds: 140 mph (230 km/h)

Overall effects
- Fatalities: 3
- Injuries: >100
- Areas affected: Perryton, Texas

A large and intense cone tornado touched down northwest of Perryton and moved southeastward toward town. The tornado first crossed Loop 143 and struck a mobile home park, completely destroying multiple mobile homes, killing one person, and igniting a fire in the remaining rubble. Several cars were rolled, and debris was scattered throughout the area. The tornado continued southeast into residential parts of Perryton, where dozens of frame homes and mobile homes were heavily damaged or destroyed and severe tree damage occurred. The tornado then reached its peak intensity and moved directly through downtown Perryton at the intersection of US 83 and SH 15, destroying multiple retail stores, downing a cell tower, and bending a 200-foot self-supported microwave tower in half. Several brick buildings partially collapsed or were severely damaged in the downtown area, including a food bank where another person was killed. Streets were littered with debris, vehicles were destroyed, and heavy machinery was knocked over at a grain facility. The Perryton City Shop and a nearby metal building were badly damaged, and a third fatality occurred at Perryton Printing Co, which was almost completely leveled and had only a few interior walls left standing. Buildings were also destroyed at a lumber and hardware business, and a church was heavily damaged. The tornado then damaged or destroyed additional homes in neighborhoods east of downtown Perryton and then moved into an industrial area at the east edge of town, destroying large industrial buildings. Along Loop 143, a guyed communications tower was toppled, two tanker trucks were tossed, and numerous metal fuel tanks were thrown, seven of which were found in a pond outside of town. The tornado then caused minor ground scouring as it exited Perryton and tracked into an open field, damaging a grain silo and some farming equipment before it rapidly weakened and dissipated. In all, the tornado damaged or destroyed nearly 200 homes and injured over 100 people.

=== Bay Springs–Louin, Mississippi ===
Bay Springs–Louin, Mississippi
- EF3 damage to a structure in Bay Springs

Meteorological history
- Formed: June 15, 2023, 11:29 p.m. CDT
- Dissipated: June 15, 2023, 11:48 p.m. CDT
- Duration: 39 minutes

EF3 tornado
- on the Enhanced Fujita scale
- Highest winds: 150 mph (240 km/h)

Overall effects
- Fatalities: 1
- Injuries: 25
- Damage: $5.00 million (2023 USD)
- Areas affected: Jasper County, Mississippi particularly Bay Springs, and Louin

This intense tornado was the strongest of the outbreak, with maximum winds estimated up to 150 mph (240 km/h). The tornado first touched down along MS Highway 15 north of Bay Springs, continued towards the northeast before dissipating east of Louin.

Upon touching down, multiple power lines were blown down along Commerce Drive in Bay Springs, and the Hol-Mac Plant sustained some minor damage. More intense structural damage occurred to buildings at Pecos Farms, where some buildings and facilities sustained major roof damage, and vehicles also sustained intense damaged. Multiple loaded trucks in this area were flipped. Substantial tree damage started on the eastern side of the facility as the tornado moved across the property of Jones Lumber. In this area, three metal buildings were completely destroyed, and another three sustained intense damage. Winds in this area were estimated up to 150 mph (240 km/h).

The tornado continued to cause substantial tree and power line damage as it continued tracking towards the northeast. Notable tree damage against forward motion was also observed along the path. A few homes on the edge of the path sustained minor damage, especially along County Road 1529 and County Road 15291. A section of a double wooden pole transmission lines were blown down just west of County Road 1537, which is where the tornado reached it's peak in width. The tornado then continued into Tallahoma Creek Bottom, where it would cause significant tree damage. The tornado crossed County Road 1612, where a chicken farm was completely destroyed, and extensive tree damage occurred. Several homes were damaged, including one home that had its roof blown away, and a mobile home was flipped. The tornado then moved across County Roads 16 and 16142. This area is where the most intense damage would occur. Most homes in this area were damaged or destroyed. All 25 injuries and the only fatality from the tornado occurred in this area. Winds in this area were estimated to have reached 150 mph (240 km/h). Nearly a dozen mobile homes were destroyed, including some that were thrown long distances and shattered. Over a dozen conventional homes were severely damaged with roofs blown away, or main walls blown down. The tornado continued across County Road 168 where substantial tree damage continued and several more homes sustained major damage, including 2 homes that had their roofs torn off. The tornado then moved into a heavily wooded area before dissipating near County Road 23 south of Louin.

== Non-tornadic effects ==
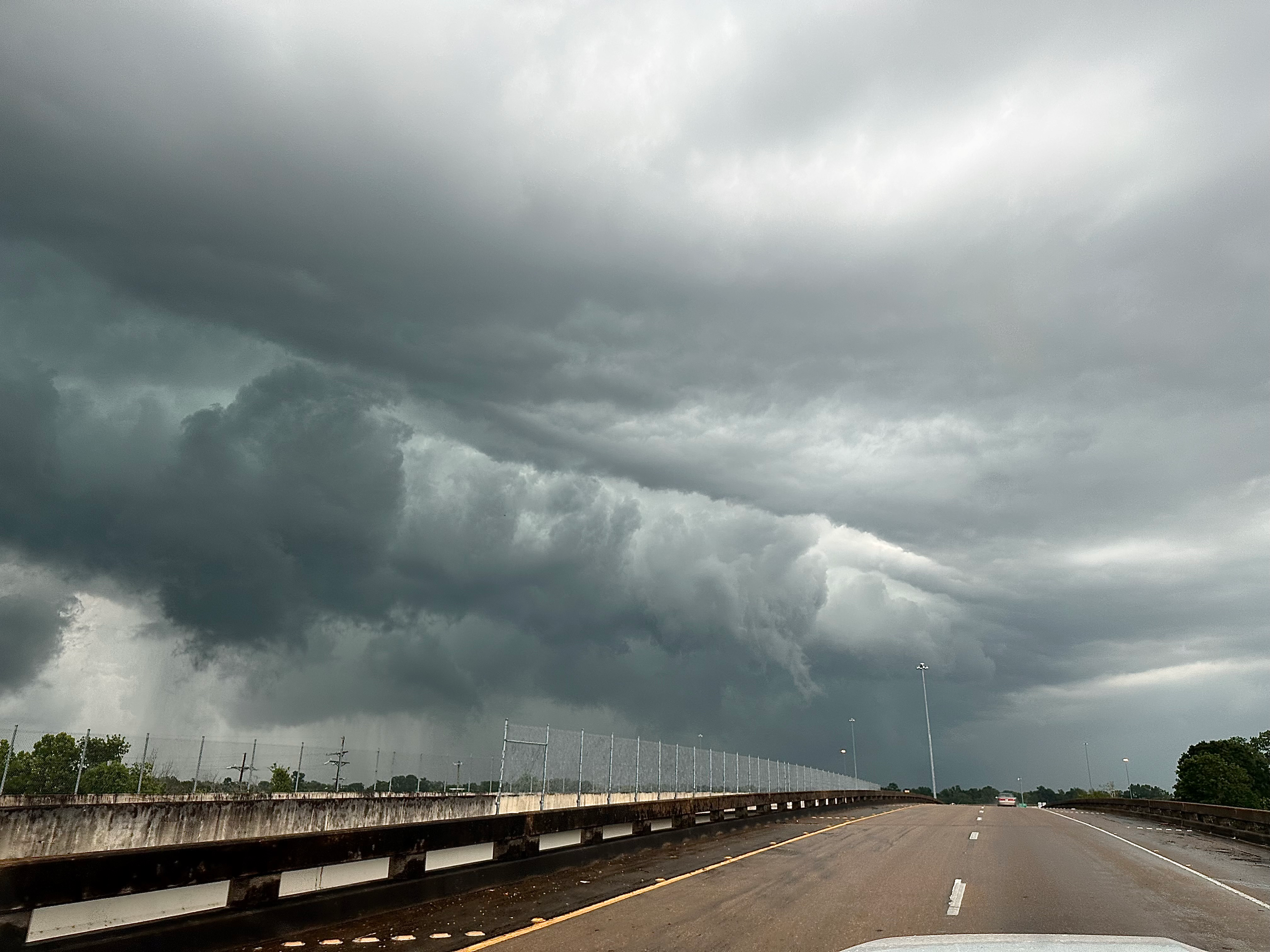
Storm that was responsible for significant straight-line wind damage in Tuscaloosa County, Alabama

Flash flooding in Pensacola, Florida, after a tornado in the area, resulted from 9.23 inches (234 mm) of rain in five hours, and strong winds blew a tree into a house, killing one person. The flooding in Pensacola prompted a rare flash flood emergency. Rainfall totals in Gulf Breeze, Florida reached as high as 17.03 inches (433 mm) of rain, and over 20,000 customers lost power in the county. Wind gusts reached up to 96 mph (154 km/h). Late on June 15, severe storms resulted in power lines falling on the Ohio Turnpike by Exit 94, shutting the highway down for much of June 16. On June 16, severe thunderstorms in the Northeastern United States led to ground stops at LaGuardia Airport, Newark Liberty International Airport and Philadelphia International Airport. Portions of the Philadelphia metropolitan area received up to 1.5–2 inches (38–51 mm) of rain, prompting a flash flood warning. The storms in Philadelphia also caused a brief delay in repairing a stretch of I-95 following a highway collapse earlier in the week. Further south, a Dierks Bentley concert in Raleigh was delayed due to the storms.

The storm system that caused significant damage in Pensacola also affected western Alabama. On the evening of June 16, a storm cluster affected parts of Pickens, Greene, and Tuscaloosa counties, leaving a sizable damage swath. Winds were estimated at 50–75 mph (80–121 km/h), with peak gusts of 90–95 mph (145–153 km/h). This resulted in thousands of trees being downed from the town of Gordo to the Ralph community, where hundreds of trees were snapped or uprooted along a six-mile-wide path. Several homes in Ralph sustained roof damage, and several garages and outbuildings sustained heavy damage. Debris near Ralph led to the closure of all lanes, eastbound and westbound, on I-20/59. Power outages affected thousands of residents in Tuscaloosa County, which lasted for a few days, and disrupted cell service in many areas.

On June 18, flash flooding in the Saint Louis metropolitan area resulted in I-55 shutting down. In addition, flooding in Pensacola resulting in Fort Pickens shutting down until June 22. A powerful mesoscale convective system also affected a large swath of northern Oklahoma. Central Oklahoma saw scattered damaging winds and a large amount of power outages, while winds of up to 100 mph (160 km/h) caused widespread damage across Northeastern Oklahoma, including the Tulsa metropolitan area, and 341,000 power outages occurred.

== See also ==
- List of North American tornadoes and tornado outbreaks
- Tornadoes of 2023
- Weather of 2023
- Tornado outbreak sequence of June 20–26, 2023 – Another stretch of high tornadic activity that began a day later
