= June 2023 tornado outbreak sequence =

June 2023 tornado outbreak sequence may refer to:

- Tornado outbreak sequence of June 14–19, 2023
- Tornado outbreak sequence of June 20–26, 2023
