= Caln =

Caln is a place name in Pennsylvania. The name extends to three townships.

- Caln Township, Pennsylvania
- East Caln Township, Pennsylvania
- West Caln Township, Pennsylvania
