= Cyril Edward Cain =

American educator and historian

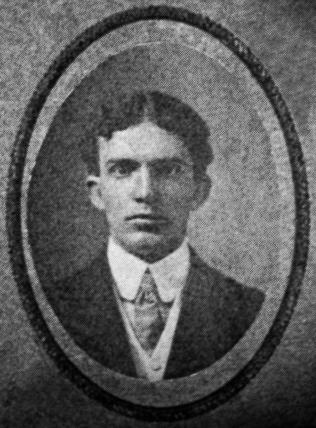
- Cyril Edward Cain, circa 1910
- Born: February 1, 1883; Dead Lake community, Jackson County, Mississippi
- Died: August 14, 1963 (aged 80); Starkville, Mississippi
- Occupation(s): University professor, Historian
- Parent(s): Father: William Yancey Cain; Mother: Sarah Burnettie Fletcher Cain

Cyril Edward Cain (February 1, 1883 − August 14, 1963) was a licensed preacher, university professor, and historian.

== Early years ==
Cyril Edward Cain was born in the Dead Lake community, near Vancleave in Jackson County, Mississippi on February 1, 1883, and was the eldest son of William Yancey Cain and Sarah Burnettie Fletcher Cain. From age 8 through 16, Cyril Cain received his secondary education in the Red Hill School of Jackson County.

In 1904, the Seashore District of the Mississippi Methodist Conference granted Cyril Cain a certificate to preach in the Methodist Church.

On July 19, 1911, Cyril Cain married Annie Rebecca Gray in Montrose, Mississippi.

== Career ==
Cyril Cain served as a public school teacher and principal in the communities of Dead Lake and Burns, Mississippi. In 1919, Cyril Cain enrolled in Mississippi State College where he received his BS and MS degrees in 1923 and 1924, respectively. In 1928, Cyril Cain received an MA degree in psychology from Cornell University.

In 1929, Cyril Cain returned to Mississippi State College, where he taught courses in psychology and education until he retired in 1953, as Professor Emeritus.

== Historian ==
From 1954 to 1955, Cyril Cain served as president of the Mississippi Genealogical Society. He is best known for his literary works of history and genealogy:

- Cain, Cyril Edward. 1953. Our Cains, Gibsons, Allisons and Campbells.
- Cain, Cyril Edward. 1953. Four Centuries on the Pascagoula, Volume I: History, Story, and Legend of the Pascagoula River Country.
- Cain, Cyril Edward. 1954. Flags over Mississippi: Sixteen variants of the seven flags of the seven nations which have had dominion over Mississippi in the last four hundred years.
- Cain, Cyril Edward. 1962. Four Centuries on the Pascagoula, Volume II: History and Genealogy of the Pascagoula River Country.

== Death ==
Cyril Edward Cain died in 1963 and was buried in Montrose Presbyterian Church Cemetery, Jasper County, Mississippi.
