= Hatfield–Hibernia Historic District =

Historic district in Pennsylvania, United States

- U.S. National Register of Historic Places
- U.S. Historic district
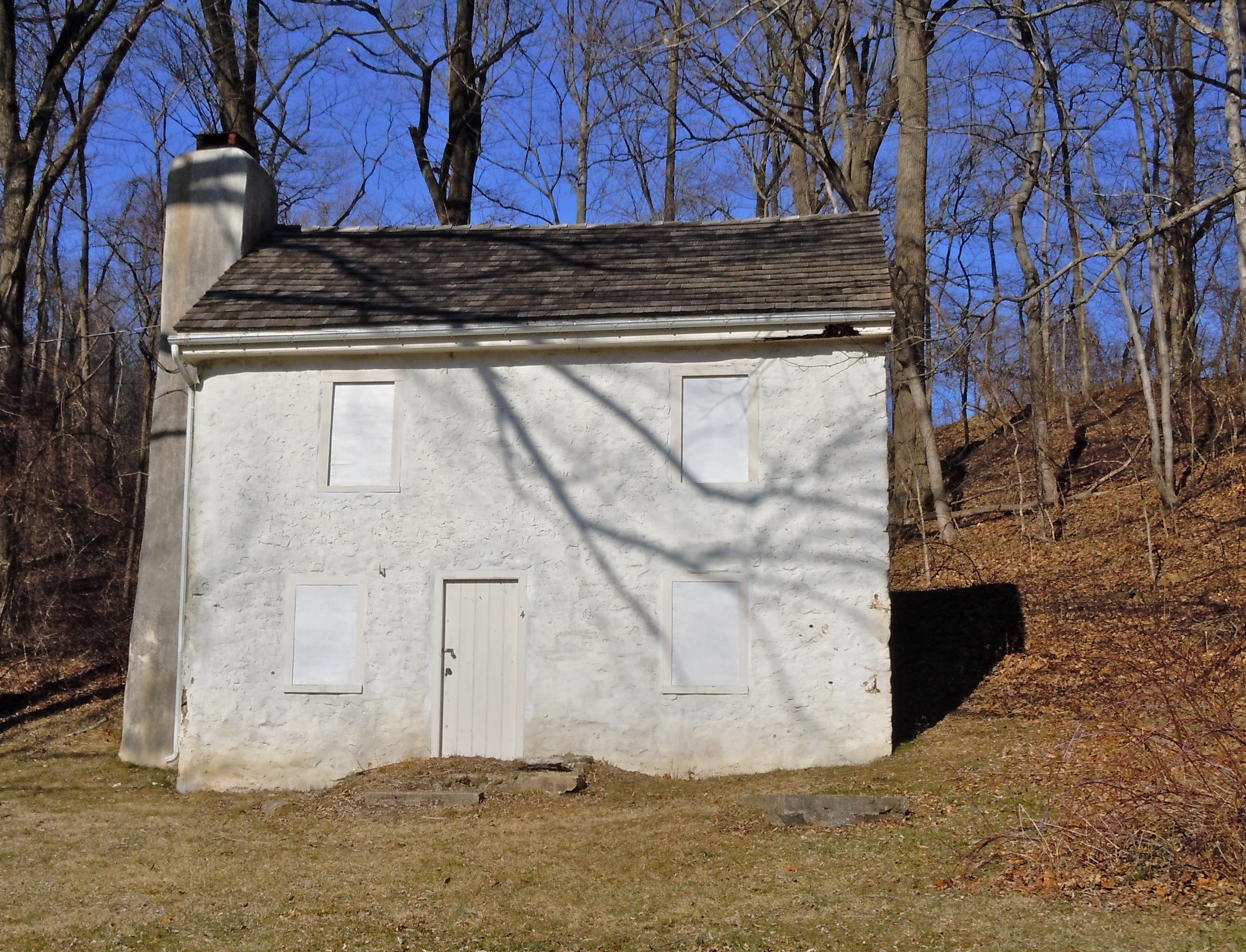
- Mill and Miller's House in Hatfield–Hibernia Historic District, March 2011

- Location within Pennsylvania Location within the United States
- Location: North of Wagontown, West Brandywine Township and West Caln Township, Pennsylvania
- Coordinates: 40°01′24″N 75°50′46″W
- Area: 828.7 acres (335.4 ha)
- Built: 1749
- NRHP reference No.: 84003205
- Added to NRHP: June 20, 1984

The Hatfield–Hibernia Historic District is a national historic district which is located in West Brandywine Township and West Caln Township, Chester County, Pennsylvania.

It was added to the National Register of Historic Places in 1984.

== History and architectural features ==
The district includes one contributing site and nineteen contributing buildings which are located in a rural area of western Chester County, and also includes land that was once associated with the Hatfield Mansion and Estate. Notable buildings include a number of early 19th-century worker's houses, multiple cottages associated with the Hibernia House, and the Hibernia Methodist Church, which was erected in 1841. The contributing site contains the ruins of a grist mill. This historic district also includes the separately listed Hibernia House.
