= Montrose, Mississippi =

- Town
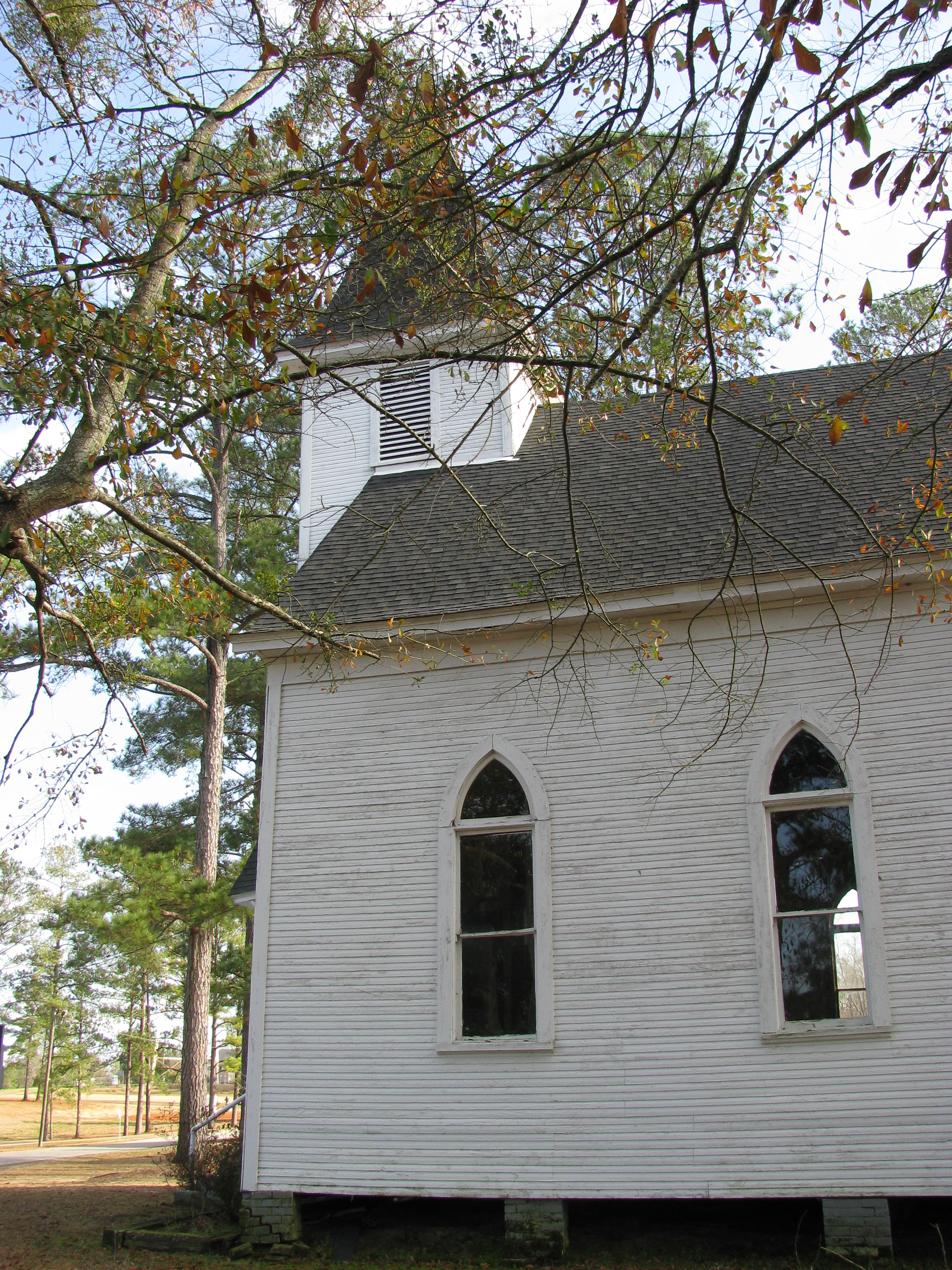
- Montrose Presbyterian Church

- Location of Montrose, Mississippi

- Location in the United States
- Coordinates: 32°7′27″N 89°14′8″W
- Country: United States
- State: Mississippi
- County: Jasper

Area
  - Total: 2.71 sq mi (7.03 km^{2})
  - Land: 2.71 sq mi (7.03 km^{2})
  - Water: 0 sq mi (0.00 km^{2})
- Elevation: 430 ft (131 m)

Population (2020)
  - Total: 104
  - Density: 38/sq mi (14.8/km^{2})
- Time zone: UTC-6 (Central (CST))
  - Summer (DST): UTC-5 (CDT)
- ZIP code: 39338
- Area code: 601
- FIPS code: 28-48640
- GNIS feature ID: 0694023

Montrose is a town in Jasper County, Mississippi, United States. As of the 2020 census, Montrose had a population of 104.

== History ==
Montrose High School became Mississippi Conference Training School. Walter Waddell James attended Montrose High School and became a lawyer and mayor of Newton, Mississippi. William Taylor Simmons, who served in the Mississippi Senate, also attended the high school.

Forest District High School was in Montrose in 1908.

== Geography ==
Montrose is located in northwestern Jasper County at 32°7′27″N 89°14′8″W (32.124254, -89.235657), in the southeastern corner of Bienville National Forest. Mississippi Highway 15 passes through the town, leading southwest 11 miles (18 km) to Bay Springs, the county seat, and northeast 16 miles (26 km) to Newton.

According to the United States Census Bureau, the town has a total area of 2.7 square miles (7.0 km^{2}), all land.

== Demographics ==
Historical population
Census	Pop.	Note	%±
1910	427		—
1920	398		−6.8%
1930	312		−21.6%
1940	278		−10.9%
1950	222		−20.1%
1960	169		−23.9%
1970	160		−5.3%
1980	120		−25.0%
1990	106		−11.7%
2000	127		19.8%
2010	140		10.2%
2020	104		−25.7%
U.S. Decennial Census

As of the census of 2000, there were 127 people, 51 households, and 37 families residing in the town. The population density was 46.7 inhabitants per square mile (18.0/km^{2}). There were 73 housing units at an average density of 26.8 per square mile (10.3/km^{2}). The racial makeup of the town was 86.61% White, 12.60% African American and 0.79% Native American. Hispanic or Latino people of any race were 2.36% of the population.

There were 51 households, out of which 27.5% had children under the age of 18 living with them, 60.8% were married couples living together, 3.9% had a female householder with no husband present, and 25.5% were non-families. 25.5% of all households were made up of individuals, and 23.5% had someone living alone who was 65 years of age or older. The average household size was 2.49 and the average family size was 2.97.

In the town, the population was spread out, with 24.4% under the age of 18, 11.0% from 18 to 24, 22.8% from 25 to 44, 21.3% from 45 to 64, and 20.5% who were 65 years of age or older. The median age was 39 years. For every 100 females, there were 104.8 males. For every 100 females age 18 and over, there were 92.0 males.

The median income for a household in the town was $29,792, and the median income for a family was $36,667. Males had a median income of $26,484 versus $25,000 for females. The per capita income for the town was $14,016. There were 11.5% of families and 11.4% of the population living below the poverty line, including 9.8% of under eighteens and 17.6% of those over 64.

== Education ==
Montrose is served by the West Jasper School District. Its comprehensive high school is Bay Springs High School.

== Climate ==
The climate in this area is characterized by hot, humid summers and generally mild to cool winters. According to the Köppen Climate Classification system, Montrose has a humid subtropical climate, abbreviated "Cfa" on climate maps.
