= Montrose Presbyterian Church =

Historic church in Mississippi, United States

- U.S. National Register of Historic Places
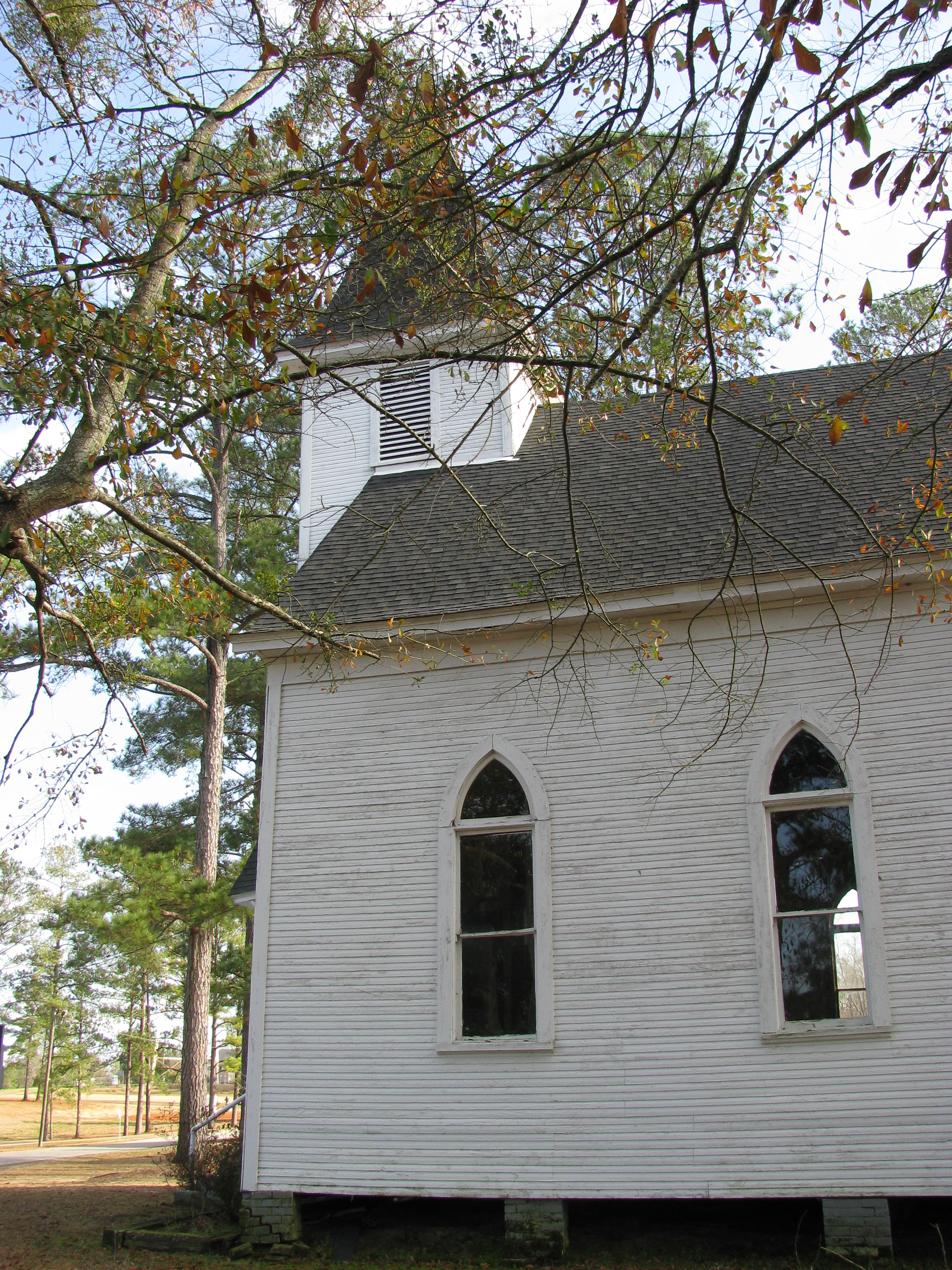
- Montrose Presbyterian Church in 2008

- Location within Mississippi Location within the United States
- Location: Cty Rd. 20, Montrose, Mississippi
- Coordinates: 32°7′24″N 89°14′12″W
- Area: less than one acre
- Built: 1910
- Architectural style: Gothic
- NRHP reference No.: 03000388
- Added to NRHP: May 09, 2003

Montrose Presbyterian Church is a historic church on County Road 20 in Montrose, Mississippi, United States.

== History ==
Montrose Presbyterian Church was organized in 1841, and the church building was constructed in 1907. Land for the church and cemetery was donated by John Newton Waddel, who served as The University of Mississippi chancellor from 1865 to 1874. In 1983, the church ceased as an organization.

The church building was added to the National Register in 2003.

Mississippi historian Cyril Edward Cain (1883–1963) is buried in Montrose Presbyterian Church Cemetery.
