= 2011 Enterprise tornado =

2011 EF4 tornado in Mississippi and Alabama

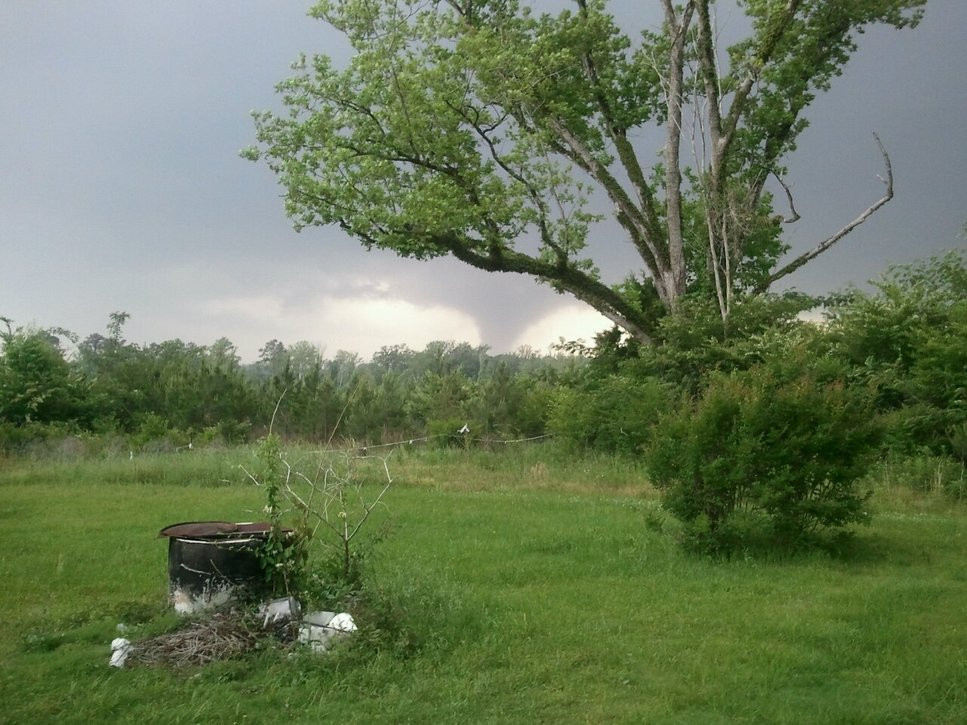
- The EF4 Enterprise tornado, as it was in southeast Mississippi.

Meteorological history
- Formed: April 27, 2011, 5:42 p.m. CDT (UTC−05:00)
- Dissipated: April 27, 2011, 8:35 p.m. CDT (UTC−05:00)
- Duration: 2 hours, 53 minutes

EF4 tornado
- on the Enhanced Fujita scale
- Max width: 1,056 yards (0.600 mi; 0.966 km)
- Path length: 122.04 miles (196.40 km)
- Highest winds: 175 mph (282 km/h)

Overall effects
- Fatalities: 7
- Injuries: 17
- Damage: $26.91 Million (2011 USD)
- Areas affected: Smith County, Mississippi, Jasper County, Mississippi, Clarke County, Mississippi, Choctaw County, Alabama, Sumter County, Alabama, Marengo County, Alabama, and Perry County, Alabama
- Part of the 2011 Super Outbreak and Tornadoes of 2011

During the early evening hours of April 27, 2011, an extremely long-tracked and violent EF4 tornado, known officially as the Rose Hill–Enterprise tornado and most commonly known as the Enterprise tornado, struck parts of southeast Mississippi and central Alabama. It caused immense damage, notably in the town of Enterprise, Mississippi. It was the second longest tracked tornado of the 2011 Super Outbreak, the largest tornado outbreak ever recorded. The multi-vortex tornado remained on the ground for an incredible 2 hours and 53 minutes, carving a path of 122.04 miles (196.40 km) across Mississippi and Alabama, causing 7 deaths, and 17 injuries.

The supercell thunderstorm responsible for this tornado first developed at roughly 4:30 p.m. CDT southwest of Jackson, Mississippi where it rapidly matured and swiftly moved east. Eventually, the tornado touched down at 5:42 p.m. CDT near the town of Raleigh, Mississippi and quickly escalated in intensity producing EF2 and EF3 damage. The tornado would continue its track producing EF4 damage in both Enterprise, Mississippi and Louin, Mississippi. After this the tornado would once again weaken back to EF3 intensity as it crossed Highway 514 northeast of Snell, Mississippi still causing extensive tree damage and significant roof damage to several large frame homes, before moving across the state line into Choctaw County, Alabama. The tornado would continue its path entering Perry County, Alabama further weakening to EF2 strength until eventually dissipating near Uniontown, Alabama at 8:35 p.m.

== Meteorological synopsis ==
=== Setup ===
The environmental conditions leading up to the 2011 Super Outbreak were among the "most conducive to violent tornadoes ever documented". On April 25, a vigorous upper-level shortwave trough moved into the Southern Plains states. Ample instability, low-level moisture, and wind shear all fueled a significant tornado outbreak from Texas to Tennessee; at least 64 tornadoes touched down on this day. An area of low pressure consolidated over Texas on April 26 and traveled east while the aforementioned shortwave trough traversed the Mississippi and Ohio River valleys. Another 50 tornadoes touched down on this day. The multi-day outbreak culminated on April 27 with the most violent day of tornadic activity since the 1974 Super Outbreak. Multiple episodes of tornadic activity ensued with two waves of mesoscale convective systems in the morning hours, followed by a widespread outbreak of supercells from Mississippi to North Carolina during the afternoon into the evening.

Tornadic activity on April 27 was precipitated by a 995 mbar (hPa; 29.39 inHg) surface low situated over Kentucky and a deep, negatively tilted (aligned northwest to southeast) trough over Arkansas and Louisiana. A strong southwesterly surface jet intersected these systems at a 60° angle, an ageostrophic flow that led to storm-relative helicity values in excess of 500 m^{2}s^{−2}—indicative of extreme wind shear and a very high potential for rotating updrafts within supercells. Ample moisture from the Gulf of Mexico was brought north across the Deep South, leading to daytime high temperatures of 77 to 81 °F (25 to 27 °C) and dewpoints of 66 to 72 °F (19 to 22 °C). Furthermore, convective available potential energy (CAPE) values reached 2,500–3,000 J/kg.

=== Forecast ===
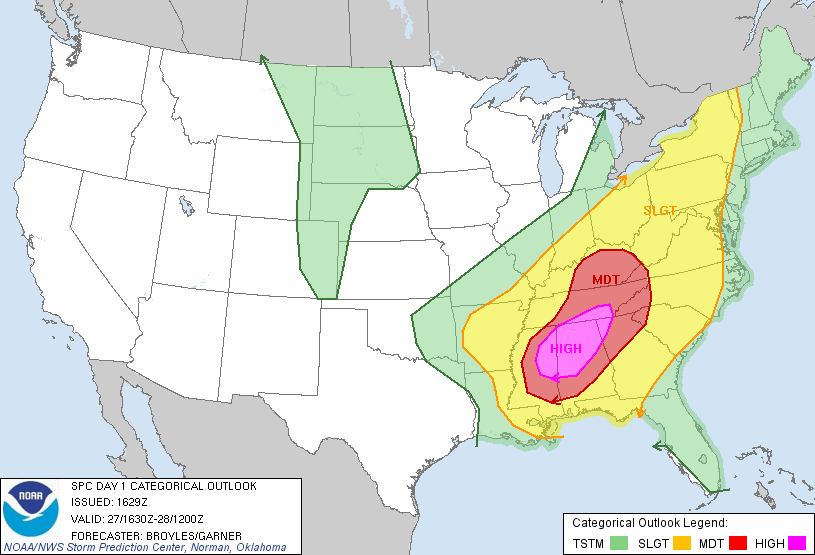
The National Weather Service Storm Prediction Center's Day 1 Convective Outlook for April 27, showing the Categorical Graphic

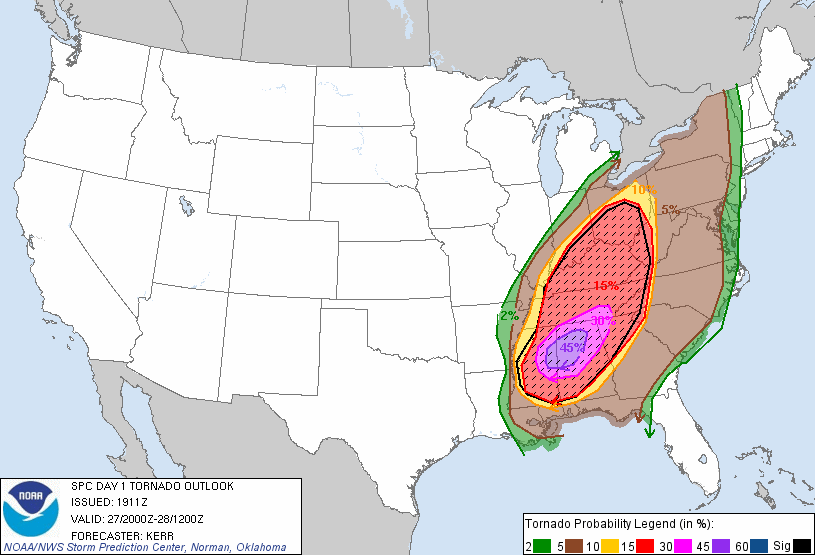
The probability of a tornado within 25 miles of a point (cross-hatched area: 10% or greater probability of EF2+ tornadoes)

On the morning of April 27, 2011, a strong cold front with several areas of embedded low pressure extended from the Texas Hill Country northeastward towards the Arklatex and the Ozarks, and later into the lower Ohio Valley. Warm, moist air was in place due to strong southerly flow ahead of the front over Mississippi, Alabama, and Tennessee. An upper-level disturbance sparked a broad area of showers and thunderstorms as it moved across the frontal boundary on the previous evening. The eastern edge of the line of showers and storms continued to move eastward, in concert with the upper disturbance, reaching the northwest Alabama border around 2:00 a.m. CDT.

This produced the last and most violent round of severe weather, which began around 2:30 p.m. CDT for northern Alabama as supercells began to line up to the southwest of the area. During the early afternoon hours, the potential for destructive tornadoes was highlighted by the Storm Prediction Center's upgrade to a high risk for severe weather around 1:00 p.m. CDT. This prompted a particularly dangerous situation (PDS) tornado watch, which was issued for northern Alabama and portions of southern Tennessee at 1:45 p.m. CDT. The bulletin that accompanied the watch read:

THE NWS STORM PREDICTION CENTER HAS ISSUED A TORNADO WATCH FOR PORTIONS OF: MUCH OF ALABAMA, NORTHWEST GEORGIA, SOUTHEAST MISSISSIPPI, SOUTHERN MIDDLE TENNESSEE, EFFECTIVE THIS WEDNESDAY AFTERNOON AND EVENING FROM 145 PM UNTIL 1000 PM CDT.

...THIS IS A PARTICULARLY DANGEROUS SITUATION...

DESTRUCTIVE TORNADOES...LARGE HAIL TO 4 INCHES IN DIAMETER. THUNDERSTORM WIND GUSTS TO 80 MPH...AND DANGEROUS LIGHTNING ARE POSSIBLE IN THESE AREAS.

The potential for tornadoes ramped up from noon through 9:00 p.m. CDT. During this period, much of Mississippi and Alabama experienced numerous supercell thunderstorms that produced multiple violent tornadoes, including four EF5s tornadoes.

== Tornado summary ==
- Damage survey track of this tornado (centermost red line), as well as the tracks of other EF3+ tornadoes that occurred during 2011 Super Outbreak. (Interactive map, click or tap to view in detail); View mapdata Key EF0 65–85 mph (105–137 km/h); EF1 86–110 mph (138–177 km/h); EF2 111–135 mph (179–217 km/h); EF3 136–165 mph (219–266 km/h); EF4 166–200 mph (267–322 km/h); EF5 ≥201 mph (323 km/h)

=== Mississippi ===
The touched down at around 5:42 PM near the town of Raleigh, Mississippi and almost immediately began showing signs of intensity. The tornado initially downed trees, blew skirting from mobile homes, and tore shingles from roofs. The tornado intensified as it moved northeast across Smith County and produced up to EF2 and EF3 damage. One mobile home was picked up, bounced a couple times, and thrown into a tree line, where it was torn apart and debris was scattered up to a mile away, including the frame. The tornado mowed down a stand of pine trees and destroyed two frame houses, with major damage to the interior walls, and the exterior walls completely destroyed. Many power poles were snapped, a mobile home was annihilated, and a large shop building was completely destroyed as well. It then moved into Jasper County and snapped and debarked many pine trees. The first area of EF4 damage was observed near Louin as a frame home and several mobile homes were completely destroyed, with parts of the mobile homes being thrown long distances, and some of the frame home foundation being swept clean. The tornado caused significant damage to a poultry farm and cattle ranch before it weakened briefly. It then destroyed two mobile homes and caused extensive tree and power line damage. The tornado then produced a relatively narrow path of EF1-strength tree and power line damage for several miles, until re-intensifying near to EF3 strength near Rose Hill.

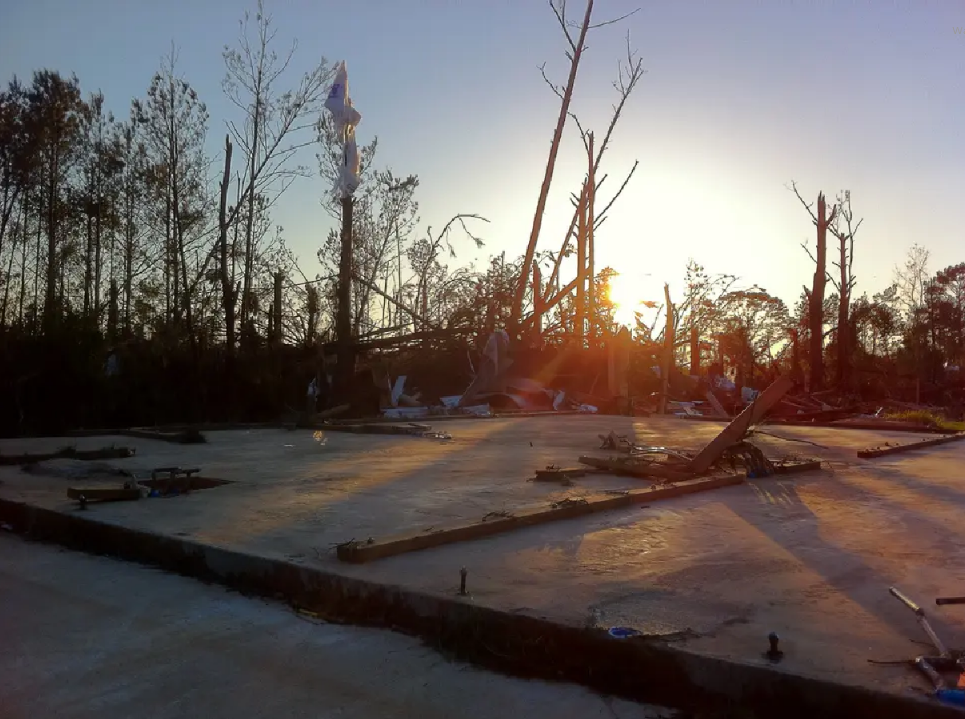
Low-end EF4 damage to a home near Enterprise, Mississippi.

Southeast of Rose Hill, the tornado removed most of the roof of a frame home and caused heavy damage to the exterior walls, took a large section of roof off another frame home, completely destroyed a large mobile home, and caused extensive tree damage. The tornado then weakened again and entered Clarke County as an EF0 while only downing a few trees. The tornado strengthened again and downed trees and power lines as it crossed Interstate 59. Several other homes and mobile homes were destroyed as the tornado moved along the south side of Enterprise. At the same time, Sean Casey of Team TIV shot the tornado with his new 3D camera as it was crossing I-59, making this the first tornado ever shot in 3D. Another area of EF4 damage was observed east of Enterprise as a new home undergoing completion was leveled, with the debris swept off the foundation. Many more frame homes were heavily damaged nearby. Many mobile homes were destroyed and trees were downed in this area as well. It then weakened slightly to EF3 strength and produced heavy damage to more houses and mobile homes. Nearby townspeople reported in one of these mobile homes 11 people were seeking refuge, 4 people overall were killed near Snell and Energy. It also downed many more trees and power lines before moving into Choctaw County, Alabama, southwest of Yantley. The tornado killed seven people and injured fourteen others on its 65-mile (105 km) portion of the path that was in Mississippi.

=== Alabama ===
As the tornado entered Choctaw County, Alabama, the tornado traveled 27.5 miles (44.3 km) as it caused extensive damage to homes (one of which was destroyed at EF3 strength), and numerous other structures. Several mobile homes were destroyed and many trees were either snapped or completely uprooted. The tornado then moved into Sumter County. In Sumter County, the tornado caused significant damage to homes and mobile homes before it crossed the Tombigbee River and moved into Marengo County. It continued causing significant tree damage as well as destroying several homes and outbuildings along a 26.7-mile (43.0 km) path in this county. The tornado then entered Perry County, the final portion of the path, where it damaged two outbuildings and a grain silo as well as causing significant tree damage before lifting just north of Uniontown at 8:35 p.m. CDT (01:35 UTC). The damage in Sumter, Marengo, and Perry Counties was rated EF2.

== Aftermath ==
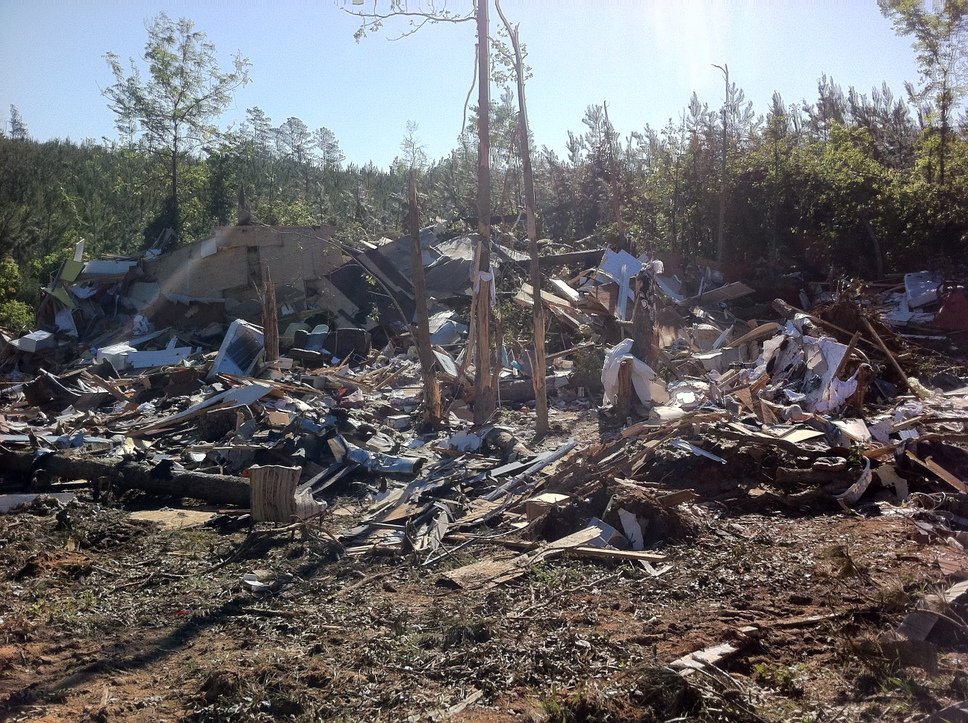
A home in Jasper County, Mississippi severely damaged by the tornado.

By the time the tornado lifted north of Uniontown, it had been on the ground for nearly three hours, having traveled 122.04 miles (196.40 km) across seven counties in two states. 7 were killed and another 17 were injured. The response to the outbreak, including the tornado was strong. As president Barack Obama declared a state of emergency in Mississippi and Alabama. Local crews in Smith, Jasper, and Clarke counties initially struggled to reach affected areas because of downed trees. In neighboring Alabama, the Alabama National Guard was deployed to assist with manpower and security. The American Red Cross collaborated with locals to establish relief efforts to those affected by the tornado. While the tornado inflicted severe damage on multiple towns, recovery was remarkably quick with most towns recovering from the tornado as early as 2012. Despite the devastation it caused the tornado would be overshadowed by the more famous tornadoes of the day, mainly the Tuscaloosa-Birmingham tornado and the 4 EF5 tornadoes.

== See also ==
- List of F4, EF4, and IF4 tornadoes
- Tornadoes of 2011
- List of tornadoes in the 2011 Super Outbreak
