= Bay Springs High School =

High school

Location
- 510 Highway 18; Bay Springs, (Jasper County), Mississippi 39422; United States; 31.9780°N 89.2784°W

Information
- Type: Public high school
- Principal: Dan Brady
- Staff: 21.16 (FTE)
- Enrollment: 247 (2023-2024)
- Student to teacher ratio: 11.67
- Colors: Royal blue and Green Bay gold
- Nickname: Bulldogs

Bay Springs High School is a public high school in Bay Springs, Mississippi. It is a part of the West Jasper School District.

Its attendance boundary includes Bay Springs, Louin, and Montrose.

Bulldogs are the school mascot. The school colors are blue and gold. The student body is 80 percent African American. In 2021 the school won its first state football championship. Bay Springs High School has won the 2A state basketball championship twice.

== History ==
It was preceded by Jasper County Agricultural High School in Bay Springs.

== Alumni ==
- Vernon Dahmer, civil rights leader murdered by the Ku Klux Klan
