= West Jasper School District =

School district in Mississippi

The West Jasper School District is a public school district based in Bay Springs, Mississippi (USA).

In addition to Bay Springs, the district also serves the towns of Louin and Montrose.

== Schools ==
- Bay Springs High School
- Bay Springs Middle School
- Bay Springs Elementary School
- Stringer Attendance Center

== Demographics ==
=== 2007-08 school year ===
There were a total of 1,656 students enrolled in the West Jasper School District during the 2007–2008 school year. The gender makeup of the district was 49% female and 51% male. The racial makeup of the district was 63.77% African American, 35.57% White, 0.36% Hispanic, 0.24% Asian, and 0.06% Native American. 68.5% of the district's students were eligible to receive free lunch.

=== Previous school years ===
School Year	Enrollment	Gender Makeup		Racial Makeup				
School Year	Enrollment	Female	Male	Asian	African American	Hispanic	Native American	White
2006-07	1,720	50%	50%	0.23%	63.31%	0.58%	0.06%	35.81%
2005-06	1,717	50%	50%	0.41%	61.91%	0.29%	0.12%	37.27%
2004-05	1,770	50%	50%	0.23%	60.62%	0.11%	0.11%	38.93%
2003-04	1,793	50%	50%	0.11%	59.84%	022%	0.17%	39.65%
2002-03	1,808	50%	50%	0.11%	60.56%	0.22%	0.17%	38.94%

== Accountability statistics ==
	2007-08	2006-07	2005-06	2004-05	2003-04	2002-03
District Accreditation Status	Accredited	Accredited	Accredited	Accredited	Accredited	Accredited
School Performance Classifications
Level 5 (Superior Performing) Schools	No School; Performance; Classifications; Assigned	1	1	1	1	1
Level 4 (Exemplary) Schools	No School; Performance; Classifications; Assigned	1	0	0	0	2
Level 3 (Successful) Schools	No School; Performance; Classifications; Assigned	1	3	2	3	1
Level 2 (Under Performing) Schools	No School; Performance; Classifications; Assigned	1	0	1	0	0
Level 1 (Low Performing) Schools	No School; Performance; Classifications; Assigned	0	0	0	0	0
Not Assigned	No School; Performance; Classifications; Assigned	0	0	0	0	0

== See also ==
- List of school districts in Mississippi
