= Wagontown, Pennsylvania =

Unincorporated community in Pennsylvania, US

- Unincorporated community
- Location within Pennsylvania
- Coordinates: 40°00′38″N 75°50′34″W
- Country: United States
- State: Pennsylvania
- County: Chester
- Township: West Caln
- Elevation: 525 ft (160 m)
- Time zone: UTC-5 (Eastern (EST))
  - Summer (DST): UTC-4 (EDT)
- ZIP code: 19376
- Area codes: 610 & 484
- GNIS feature ID: 1190483

Wagontown is an unincorporated community in West Caln Township, Chester County, Pennsylvania, United States. Wagontown is located along Pennsylvania Route 340, 2.15 miles (3.46 km) north-northwest of Coatesville. Wagontown has a post office with ZIP code 19376. The Hibernia House, which is listed on the National Register of Historic Places, is located near Wagontown.

== Notable people ==
- Rodney Linderman and Joe Genaro, members of The Dead Milkmen
