= Sandy Hill Tavern =

- U.S. National Register of Historic Places
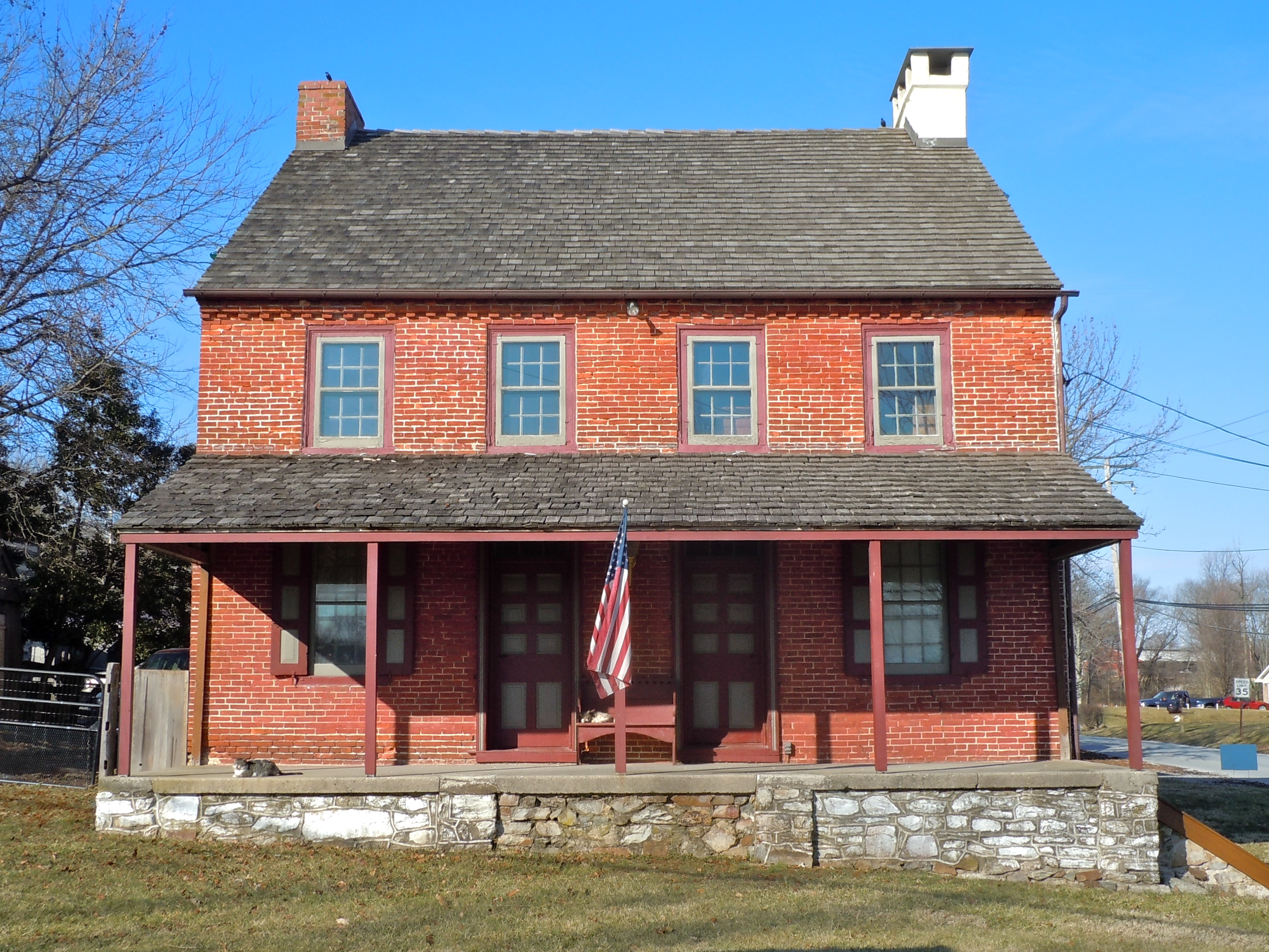
- Sandy Hill Tavern, March 2011

- Location within Pennsylvania Location within the United States
- Location: Southeast of Honey Brook on Pennsylvania Route 340, West Caln Township, Pennsylvania
- Coordinates: 40°1′0″N 75°53′46″W
- Area: 3 acres (1.2 ha)
- Built: 1805-1806
- Architectural style: Georgian, Federal
- NRHP reference No.: 80003461
- Added to NRHP: December 10, 1980

The Sandy Hill Tavern is an historic inn and tavern in West Caln Township, Chester County, Pennsylvania, United States.

It was added to the National Register of Historic Places in 1980.

== History and architectural features ==
This historic structure was built between 1805 and 1806, and is a two-story, brick structure that measures thirty feet by thirty feet with Georgian/Federal design elements. It is four bays by two bays and has a one-story shed roof porch. Built expressly as a tavern, it never functioned as such because a license could not be obtained by its owner.

The earliest recorded request for a tavern license was in 1758 when the tavern was known as the General Wolf. It was twenty years before the tavern was allowed to serve alcohol and the license was granted in 1778. Over the following twenty years, the tavern changed ownership several times and went by a variety of names, changing from the General Wolf to the Red Horse, and finally becoming the Sandy Hill Tavern.

The original wood-framed building was demolished and the brick structure seen today was built in an attempt to reclaim a permit to serve alcohol. Despite the new construction, the permit was never granted and the Sandy Hill Tavern was never a drinking establishment again.
