= Vernon Dahmer =

American civil rights activist (1908–1966)

- Born: Vernon Ferdinand Dahmer; March 10, 1908; Hattiesburg, Mississippi, U.S.
- Died: January 10, 1966 (aged 57); Hattiesburg, Mississippi, U.S.
- Cause of death: Murder (smoke inhalation)
- Organization(s): NAACP, SNCC, COFO
- Movement: Civil rights movement
- Spouses: Warnie Laura Mott (m. 1928; div. 1935) Ora Lee Smith (m. 1938; died 1950) Ellie Jewel Davis (m. 1952)

Vernon Ferdinand Dahmer Sr. (March 10, 1908 – January 10, 1966) was an American civil rights movement leader and president of the Forrest County chapter of the NAACP in Hattiesburg, Mississippi. In January 1966 Dahmer was murdered by the White Knights of the Ku Klux Klan for his work in registering Black Americans to vote.

== Early life and family ==
Vernon Dahmer was born on March 10, 1908, in the Kelly Settlement, Forrest County, Mississippi, to Ellen Louvenia (née Kelly) and George Washington Dahmer. George Dahmer, whose parents were German immigrants from Hesse-Darmstadt, was known as an honest, hardworking farmer of integrity. Vernon's mother Ellen was of mixed race: Her father, Warren Kelly, was of mixed ancestry, the son of Green H. Kelly, ultimately descended from John Kelly, a white settler; and her mother, Henrietta (McComb), was biracial, born out of wedlock to a white slave owner and one of his slaves and given to be raised by a black family, the McCombs. His cousin, Iola Williams, became the first African-American member of the San Jose, California, City Council in 1979.

Dahmer attended Bay Springs High School until the tenth grade; he failed to graduate. He was light-skinned enough to pass as a white man, but he chose to forgo the privileges of living as a white man and as a result, he faced the daily challenges of being black in Mississippi during that time.

Dahmer was married three times. His first wife was Warnie Laura Mott (1910–1975); their marriage of seven years ended in divorce in 1935. In 1938, Dahmer remarried, to a woman named Ora Lee Smith (1919–1950). She died after a long illness in 1950. Ellie Jewel Davis (born June 27, 1925) was his third and final wife; she was a teacher from Rose Hill, Mississippi, and had recently moved to Forrest County. The couple met after working together on the school board and married in March 1952. They had two children together, Dennis and Bettie, to add to the six children Dahmer had with his first two wives (three children from each marriage), making a total of seven boys and one girl. The family home was located north of Forrest County and was part of the Kelly Settlement (named for Dahmer's maternal ancestors), close to the Jones County border. Ellie Dahmer taught for many years in Richton and retired in 1987 from the Forrest County school system.

Dahmer was a member of Shady Grove Baptist Church where he was a music director and Sunday School teacher. He was also the owner of a grocery store, sawmill, planing mill, and cotton farm. As he described it, his main objective was to make a living for himself and to provide work for somebody else. He would hire local individuals from the community to work for him and did not discriminate between black or white.

== Civil rights activism ==
During the civil rights movement, Dahmer served two terms as president of the Forrest County Chapter of the National Association for the Advancement of Colored People (NAACP) and led voter registration drives in the 1960s. His wife Ellie said "He was a good progressive Christian man. He wasn't a mean, bitter Civil Rights worker, because he saw good in white as well as he did in black." As president of the Forrest County Chapter of the NAACP, he had personally asked the Student Nonviolent Coordinating Committee (SNCC) to send workers to help aid the voter registrations efforts being made by African Americans in Hattiesburg, Mississippi. SNCC had sent two workers, Curtis Hayes and Hollis Watkins, to Hattiesburg. The act of calling SNCC to help aid the efforts made by the NAACP would eventually cost him his NAACP presidency.

In 1949, Dahmer was in the process of making out his new registration card when Luther Cox denied his attempts to re-register. Luther Cox was the authority figure in charge of registered voters in Forrest County and was a white segregationist. Cox would only authorize a registration of a black person if they could answer the question "How many bubbles are in a bar of soap?" In 1950, fifteen leaders of Forrest County's black community, including Dahmer, filed a lawsuit against Cox for his administration of the voting laws. Twelve years later, in March 1962, the preliminary injunction was in motion of being viewed by the court of law. Dahmer had testified in court against Luther Cox and his testimony helped demonstrate the pattern of discrimination in the county.

In the 1950s, Dahmer and Medgar Evers founded a youth NAACP chapter in Hattiesburg. The student chapter did not last longer than a year. Dahmer continued to be supportive of SNCC for the rest of his life. His farm became a home away from home for SNCC volunteers. The farm was used for voter registration projects and helped employ the committee volunteers. Dahmer was also working closely with the Coalition for Free and Open Elections (COFO) and the Delta Ministry.

Dahmer kept a voter registration book in his grocery store in late 1965 to make it easier for blacks to register. Dahmer also made a public service announcement over the radio stating that he would help the local African American population pay a poll tax for the right to vote if they could not afford to do so themselves.

== Murder and suspects ==
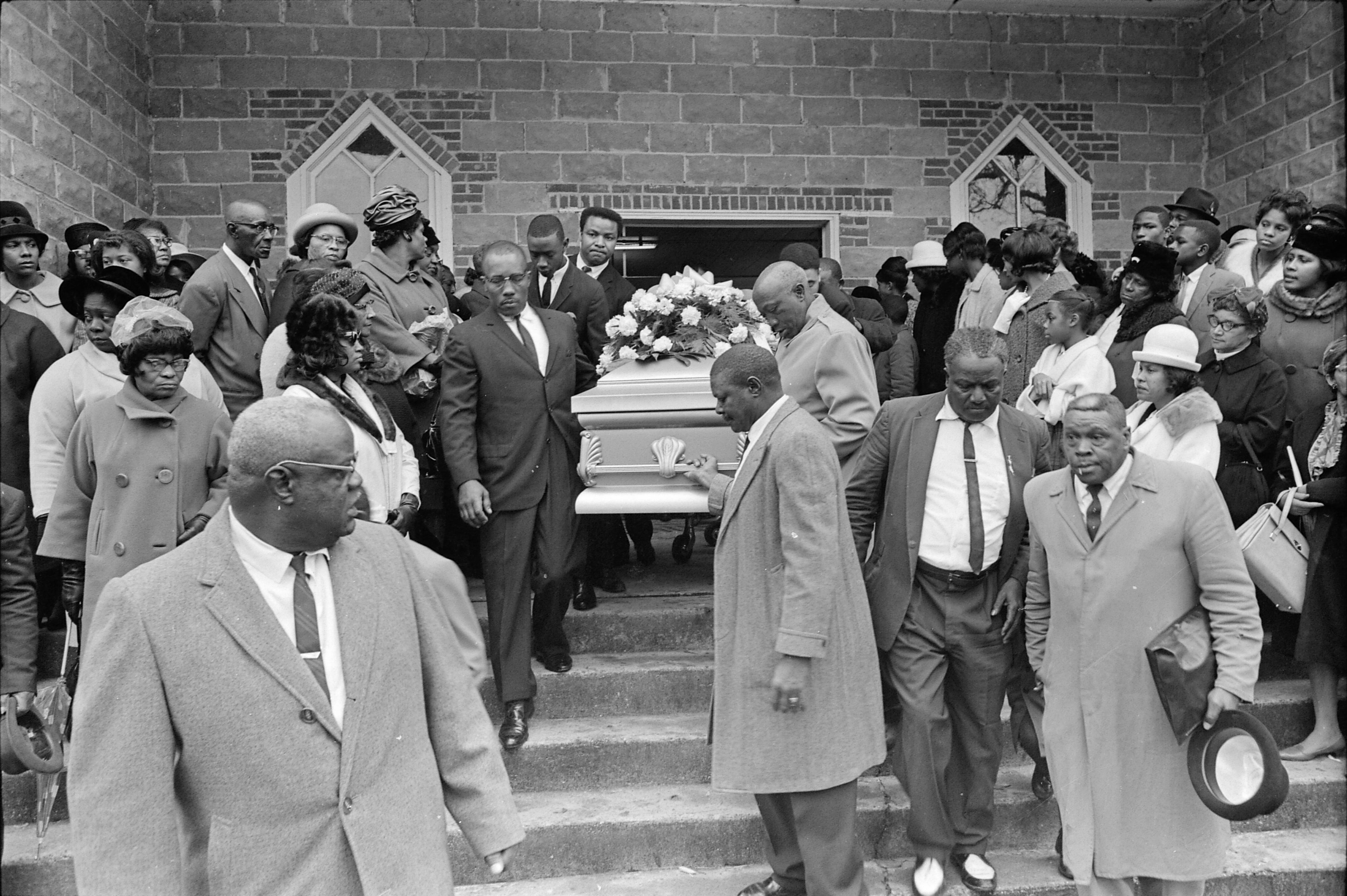
1966 funeral of Vernon Dahmer, Shady Grove Baptist Church, Kelly Settlement

As 1966 began, the Dahmers were sleeping in shifts because they had been receiving death threats throughout the past year. The Dahmers kept a shotgun by the nightstand and were willing to use it if they heard gunshots and needed to return fire. They kept the curtains tightly drawn at night in order to make it harder for night riders to see into their home.

On January 10, 1966, the Dahmer house was attacked by the White Knights of the Ku Klux Klan. The family woke to the sounds of a shotgun being discharged and gas jugs being thrown through the windows. As Ellie grabbed the children, the house erupted into flames. Dahmer returned fire from inside the house to try to distract the Klansmen while he helped hand Bettie down to Ellie. He was eventually able to flee the burning house, but he was badly burned from the waist up; Bettie's arms were also seriously burned. The Dahmers' home, grocery store, and car were all destroyed in the fire. Dahmer was taken to the hospital, where he died of smoke inhalation and damage to his lungs. Before he died, Dahmer told a local newspaper reporter: "I've been active in trying to get people to register to vote. People who don't vote are deadbeats on the state. I figure a man needs to do his own thinking. What happened to us last night can happen to anyone, white or black. At one time I didn't think so, but I have changed my mind."

The Chamber of Commerce, under Bob Beech and William Carey University President Dr. Ralph Noonkester, led a community effort to rebuild the Dahmers' home. Local and state businesses such as the Masonite Corporation, Alexander Materials, and Frierson Building Materials donated materials, local unions donated their services, and students from the University of Southern Mississippi volunteered their labor. Bob Beech's second priority was to provide college funds to Dahmer's school-aged children. Four of Dahmer's sons were serving in the U.S. military at the time, but they left their posts to help bury their father and reconstruct the family home.

The authorities indicted fourteen men, most of whom had Ku Klux Klan connections. Thirteen of the men were brought to trial for the attack on the Dahmers' home, eight of them on arson and murder charges. Four were found guilty. Lawrence Byrd was convicted of arson and received a 10-year sentence, while Charles Wilson, Cecil Sessum, and William I. Smith were convicted of murder and each sentenced to life in prison. Billy Roy Pitts (Sam Bowers' bodyguard), who had dropped his gun at the crime scene, pleaded guilty and testified against his accomplices. His testimony was credited as being largely responsible for the convictions of the others.

Charles Wilson was freed under a work-release program in 1972. His release drew anger from many black leaders and some white leaders. Governor Bill Waller, who had previously served as a legal counsel for Wilson, replied by saying that Wilson, who made artificial limbs, was needed for his skills in Laurel, Mississippi. In response to the mounting criticism, Gov. Waller also freed prisoner Hal C. Zachary—a black college graduate who had murdered a segregationist in 1963—under the same work-release program. Eleven of the defendants in the Dahmer case were also tried on federal charges of conspiracy to intimidate the victim because of his civil rights activities. Former Ku Klux Klan Imperial Wizard Sam Bowers, who was believed to have ordered the Dahmer murder, was tried four times and each time he invoked the Fifth Amendment. Each trial ended in a mistrial.

In 1991, twenty-five years after the murder of Vernon Dahmer and the assault on his family, the state of Mississippi initiated a case against Bowers for a fifth time. The legal process lasted seven years and finally ended with his conviction and sentencing to life in prison for murder and arson.

Billy Roy Pitts only served three years of his federal prison sentence. He was not required to begin his life sentence until February 1998. That was after a newspaper reported how Pitts had never served any time for the murder conviction, perhaps as a result of his role in the convictions of his accomplices. Pitts was released from prison in August 1998 when Governor Kirk Fordice indefinitely suspended his life sentence at the request of Dahmer's family. This occurred after Pitts agreed to become a key witness for the prosecution in the murder trial of Bowers.

== Honors and recognition ==
After Dahmer's death, a street and a park in Hattiesburg were named in his honor. On July 26, 1986, a memorial to Dahmer was also dedicated at the park.

In 1992, Dahmer's widow Ellie became Election Commissioner of District 2, Forrest County. For more than a decade, she served in this position, supported by black and white residents, in the same district where her husband was killed for his voting rights advocacy.

On January 8, 2016, the Mississippi State Legislature honored the civil rights leader by designating January 10 Vernon Dahmer Day. A commemoration ceremony, which was attended by Dahmer's widow and family, was held in Hattiesburg on the 50th anniversary of his death. Today, his family still attends the Shady Grove Baptist Church and its members are also very active in the community.

In January 2020, a bronze statue of Dahmer was erected in front of the Forrest County Courthouse.

In February 2025, a mural was painted in the city of Hattiesburg. Featured on the mural is Dahmer and his daughter Bettie.
