= Louin, Mississippi =

- Town
- Location of Louin, Mississippi

- Location in the United States
- Coordinates: 32°4′20″N 89°15′28″W
- Country: United States
- State: Mississippi
- County: Jasper

Area
  - Total: 6.08 sq mi (15.75 km^{2})
  - Land: 6.06 sq mi (15.70 km^{2})
  - Water: 0.015 sq mi (0.04 km^{2})
- Elevation: 423 ft (129 m)

Population (2020)
  - Total: 275
  - Density: 45.4/sq mi (17.51/km^{2})
- Time zone: UTC-6 (Central (CST))
  - Summer (DST): UTC-5 (CDT)
- ZIP code: 39338
- Area code: 601
- FIPS code: 28-42200
- GNIS feature ID: 0693834

Louin is a town in Jasper County, Mississippi, United States, located along Mississippi Highway 15. As of the 2020 census, Louin had a population of 275.

== History ==
In 2011, the town was struck by an EF4 tornado, causing two deaths.

In 2023, the town was struck by an EF3 tornado, causing one death.

== Geography ==
Louin is located in northwestern Jasper County.

According to the United States Census Bureau, Louin has a total area of 6.1 square miles (15.7 km^{2}), of which 0.02 square miles (0.04 km^{2}), or 0.28%, are water.

== Demographics ==
Historical population
Census	Pop.	Note	%±
1910	523		—
1920	475		−9.2%
1930	583		22.7%
1940	485		−16.8%
1950	478		−1.4%
1960	389		−18.6%
1970	382		−1.8%
1980	338		−11.5%
1990	289		−14.5%
2000	339		17.3%
2010	277		−18.3%
2020	275		−0.7%
U.S. Decennial Census

As of the census of 2000, there were 339 people, 137 households, and 93 families residing in the town. The population density was 55.8 inhabitants per square mile (21.5/km^{2}). There were 164 housing units at an average density of 27.0 per square mile (10.4/km^{2}). The racial makeup of the town was 68.73% White, 29.79% African American, and 1.47% from two or more races.

There were 137 households, out of which 29.2% had children under the age of 18 living with them, 54.0% were married couples living together, 10.9% had a female householder with no husband present, and 32.1% were non-families. 30.7% of all households were made up of individuals, and 19.0% had someone living alone who was 65 years of age or older. The average household size was 2.47 and the average family size was 3.05.

In the town, the population was spread out, with 25.4% under the age of 18, 9.4% from 18 to 24, 23.0% from 25 to 44, 20.4% from 45 to 64, and 21.8% who were 65 years of age or older. The median age was 38 years. For every 100 females, there were 94.8 males. For every 100 females age 18 and over, there were 96.1 males.

The median income for a household in the town was $29,583, and the median income for a family was $40,750. Males had a median income of $31,500 versus $21,477 for females. The per capita income for the town was $17,586. About 16.7% of families and 24.4% of the population were below the poverty line, including 53.8% of those under age 18 and 9.1% of those age 65 or over.

== Education ==
Louin is served by the West Jasper School District. Its comprehensive high school is Bay Springs High School.

== Notable people ==
- Murriel Page, former Women's National Basketball Association player
