= Hibernia House =

Historic house in Pennsylvania, United States

- U.S. National Register of Historic Places
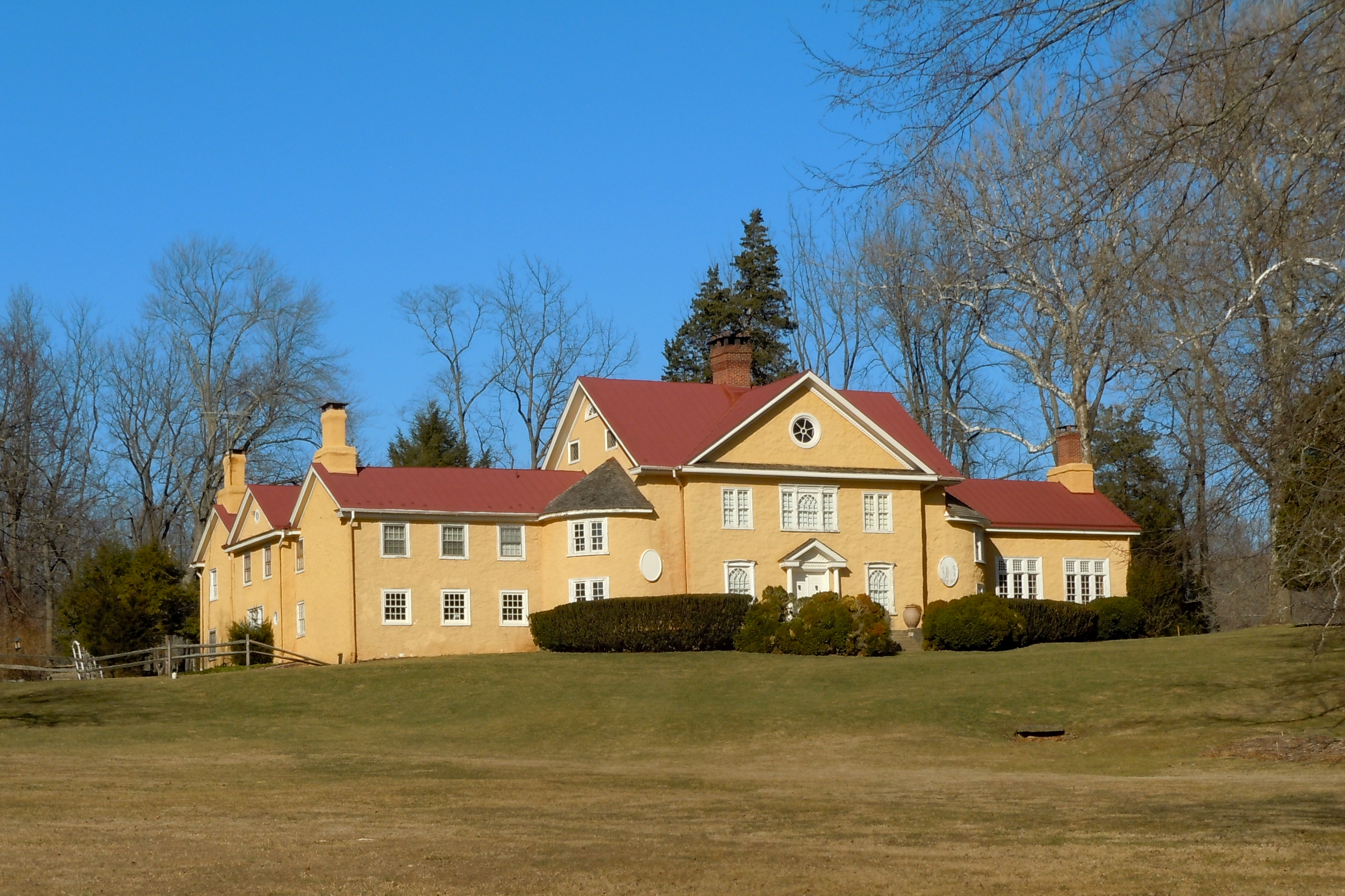
- Hibernia House, March 2011

- Location within Pennsylvania Location within the United States
- Location: North of Wagontown off Pennsylvania Route 340, West Caln Township, Pennsylvania
- Coordinates: 40°1′45″N 75°50′33″W
- Area: 9 acres (3.6 ha)
- Built: c. 1798, 1821, 1895-1910
- NRHP reference No.: 75001632
- Added to NRHP: November 20, 1975

Hibernia House is an historic home which is located in Hibernia County Park, near Wagontown, West Caln Township, Chester County, Pennsylvania.

It was added to the National Register of Historic Places in 1975.

== History and architectural features ==
Built in four phases between the late eighteenth and early twentieth centuries, the original house was owned by Isaac Van Leer and the prominent Van Leer family.

The original section was a two-story, stone dwelling, which measured eighteen feet by twenty-four feet. A one-and-one-half-story, stone kitchen was then added in 1798.

In 1821, the mansion house was built, turning the home's older sections into the structure's west wing. A two-and-one-half-story, four-bay, stone structure, the mansion house measures forty-five feet by forty-three feet. The house was modified between 1895 and 1910 to add a thirty-three-foot-wide, pedimented pavilion and ballroom to the west wing.
