= Bay Springs, Mississippi =

- City
- GM&O Railroad Depot in Bay Springs

- Location of Bay Springs, Mississippi

- Location in the United States
- Coordinates: 31°58′36″N 89°16′46″W
- Country: United States
- State: Mississippi
- County: Jasper

Government
  - Mayor: Donald Brown

Area
  - Total: 15.01 sq mi (38.87 km^{2})
  - Land: 14.95 sq mi (38.71 km^{2})
  - Water: 0.062 sq mi (0.16 km^{2})
- Elevation: 423 ft (129 m)

Population (2020)
  - Total: 1,670
  - Density: 111.8/sq mi (43.15/km^{2})
- Time zone: UTC-6 (Central (CST))
  - Summer (DST): UTC-5 (CDT)
- ZIP code: 39422
- Area code: 601
- FIPS code: 28-04060
- GNIS feature ID: 0666590
- Website: cityofbaysprings.com

Bay Springs is a city in and the western county seat of Jasper County, Mississippi, United States. The population was 1,670 at the 2020 census, down from 1,786 at the 2010 census. State highways 15 and 18 intersect at the city. It is part of the Laurel, Mississippi (in Jones County) micropolitan area.

The area was settled in the 1880s by Joe Blankenship, who built the sawmill for the yellow pine timber industry that comprised the town's industrial base. The city was incorporated about twenty years later after railroads were constructed through it. That access attracted other industry and business, and the city was designated as the second county seat. Its population has declined slightly since 2000.

== Geography ==
Bay Springs is located in western Jasper County at 31°58′36″N 89°16′46″W (31.976761, -89.279574). Mississippi Highway 15 (Court Street) passes through the center of town, leading north 27 miles (43 km) to Newton and south 24 miles (39 km) to Laurel. Highway 18 (Fifth Avenue) crosses Highway 15 in the center of town and leads northeast 21 miles (34 km) to Rose Hill and west 15 miles (24 km) to Raleigh.

According to the United States Census Bureau, the city has a total area of 15.0 square miles (38.9 km^{2}), of which 14.9 square miles (38.7 km^{2}) are land and 0.1 square miles (0.2 km^{2}), or 0.42%, are water.

== Demographics ==
Historical population
Census	Pop.	Note	%±
1910	836		—
1920	861		3.0%
1930	927		7.7%
1940	1,228		32.5%
1950	1,302		6.0%
1960	1,544		18.6%
1970	1,801		16.6%
1980	1,884		4.6%
1990	1,729		−8.2%
2000	2,097		21.3%
2010	1,786		−14.8%
2020	1,670		−6.5%
U.S. Decennial Census

=== 2020 census ===
As of the 2020 census, Bay Springs had a population of 1,670. The median age was 45.3 years. 21.3% of residents were under the age of 18 and 26.1% of residents were 65 years of age or older. For every 100 females there were 83.9 males, and for every 100 females age 18 and over there were 76.6 males age 18 and over.

0.0% of residents lived in urban areas, while 100.0% lived in rural areas.

There were 686 households in Bay Springs, of which 30.6% had children under the age of 18 living in them. Of all households, 31.0% were married-couple households, 23.8% were households with a male householder and no spouse or partner present, and 39.8% were households with a female householder and no spouse or partner present. About 38.9% of all households were made up of individuals and 19.0% had someone living alone who was 65 years of age or older.

There were 776 housing units, of which 11.6% were vacant. The homeowner vacancy rate was 0.5% and the rental vacancy rate was 5.3%.

Bay Springs racial composition as of 2020
Race	Num.	Perc.
White (non-Hispanic)	692	41.44%
Black or African American (non-Hispanic)	918	54.97%
Native American	2	0.12%
Asian	3	0.18%
Other/mixed-race	31	1.86%
Hispanic or Latino	24	1.44%

== Economics ==
Bay Springs was the site of one of six Sunbeam plants in Mississippi. When Albert J. Dunlap downsized the company and closed the plant, 300 people lost their jobs. The last workers left the plant at the same time that Dunlap was negotiating a new contract for himself, worth over $46 million. The average annual salary at the Bay Springs plant had been less than $25,000.

More recently, the Hol-Mac Corporation has located light industrial/manufacturing facilities in and around the Bay Springs area. One of the county's largest employers, this developing corporation has partnered with nearby Jones County Junior College with regard to job training and continues to expand employment opportunities in the local community. Hol-Mac operates facilities in the town of Bay Springs and north of town in designated industrial areas between Bay Springs and the town of Louin. As of 2015, it has three main manufacturing facilities in the area, as well as additional office/HR support facilities.

Georgia-Pacific Corporation has long had facilities to handle lumber and timber processing in the Bay Springs area.

The city has a county courthouse, as it is the second county seat in Jasper County. Originally there were limited roads from east to west across the county, and the two seats served local people.

== Education ==
Bay Springs is served by the West Jasper School District. Its comprehensive high school is Bay Springs High School.

The city also has a private school, Sylva-Bay Academy.

The county is in the zone for Jones College.

== Notable people ==
- Jesse L. Brown, first African-American aviator in the U.S., attended Bay Springs High School in 1940
- Snoop Conner, National Football League player
- Carolyn Jones-Young, former professional basketball player
- Haskins Montgomery, member of the Mississippi Senate
- Cody Prewitt, former National Football League player
- Johnny Stringer, former member of the Mississippi House of Representatives
- Johnny Thomas, head football coach of Alcorn State University from 1998 to 2007
- Freddye Harper Williams. journalist and Oklahoma state legislator

== Climate ==
The climate in this area is characterized by hot, humid summers and generally mild to cool winters. According to the Köppen Climate Classification system, Bay Springs has a humid subtropical climate, abbreviated "Cfa" on climate maps.
