= West Caln Township, Pennsylvania =

Township in Pennsylvania, US

West Caln Township
- Township
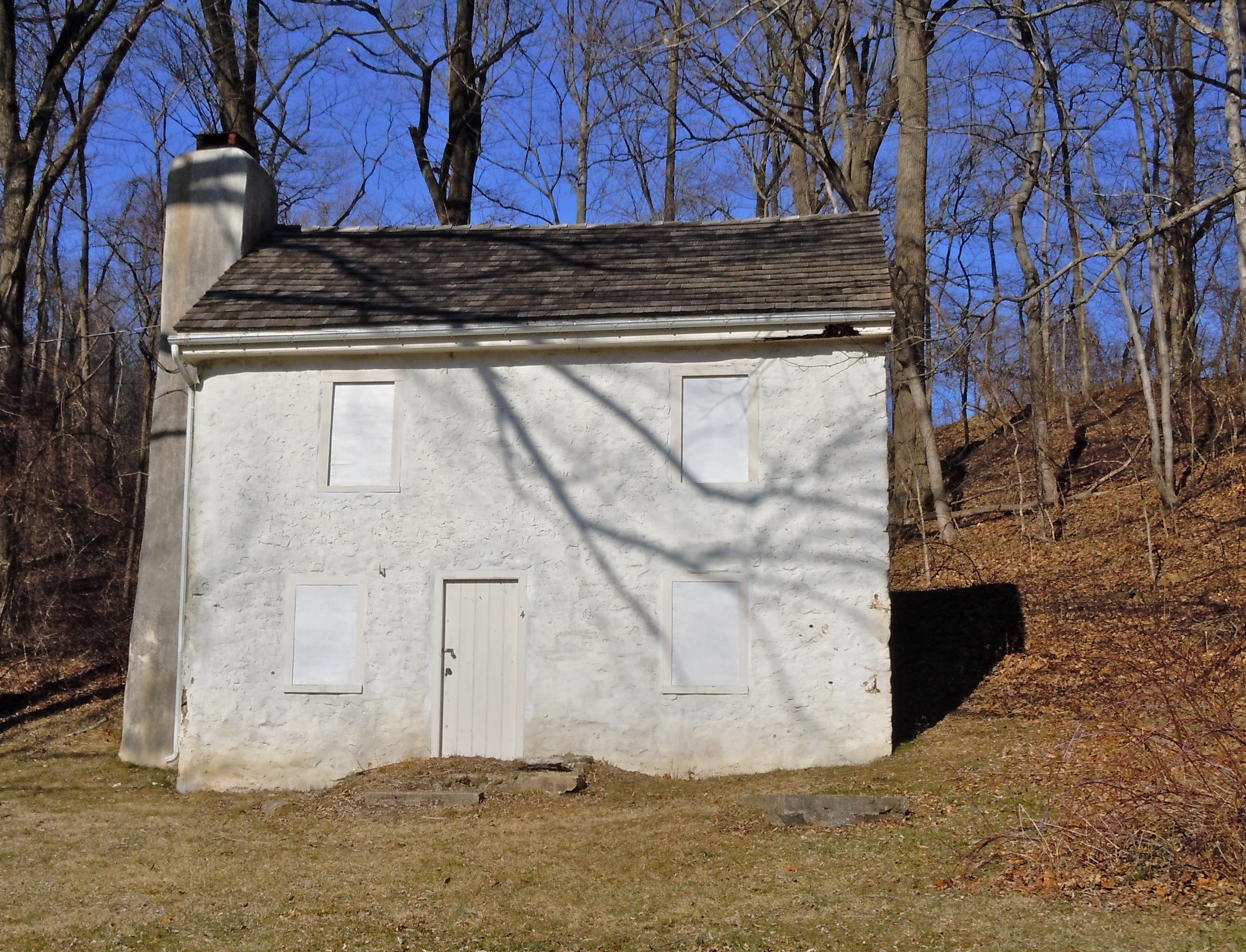
- Hatfield-Hibernia Mill

- Location of West Caln Township in Chester County (left) and of Chester County in Pennsylvania (right)

- Location of Pennsylvania in the United States
- Coordinates: 39°59′51″N 75°46′09″W
- Country: United States
- State: Pennsylvania
- County: Chester

Area
  - Total: 21.92 sq mi (56.77 km^{2})
  - Land: 21.60 sq mi (55.94 km^{2})
  - Water: 0.32 sq mi (0.84 km^{2})
- Elevation: 351 ft (107 m)

Population (2010)
  - Total: 9,014
  - Estimate (2016): 9,061
  - Density: 419.5/sq mi (161.98/km^{2})
- Time zone: UTC-5 (EST)
  - Summer (DST): UTC-4 (EDT)
- Area code: 610
- FIPS code: 42-029-82664
- Website: westcaln.org

West Caln Township is a township in Chester County, Pennsylvania, United States. The population was 9,014 at the time of the 2010 census.

== History ==
The Hatfield-Hibernia Historic District, Hibernia House, and Sandy Hill Tavern are listed on the National Register of Historic Places.

== Geography ==
According to the U.S. Census Bureau, the township has a total area of 21.8 square miles (56 km^{2}), of which 0.1 square miles (0.26 km^{2}), or 0.41%, is water.

== Demographics ==
Historical population
Census	Pop.	Note	%±
1930	1,069		—
1940	1,214		13.6%
1950	1,485		22.3%
1960	2,140		44.1%
1970	3,152		47.3%
1980	4,958		57.3%
1990	6,143		23.9%
2000	7,054		14.8%
2010	9,014		27.8%
2020	8,910		−1.2%

At the time of the 2010 census, the township was 91.7% non-Hispanic White, 3.9% Black or African American, 0.2% Native American, 0.7% Asian, and 1.8% were two or more races. 2.3% of the population were of Hispanic or Latino ancestry.

== Transportation ==
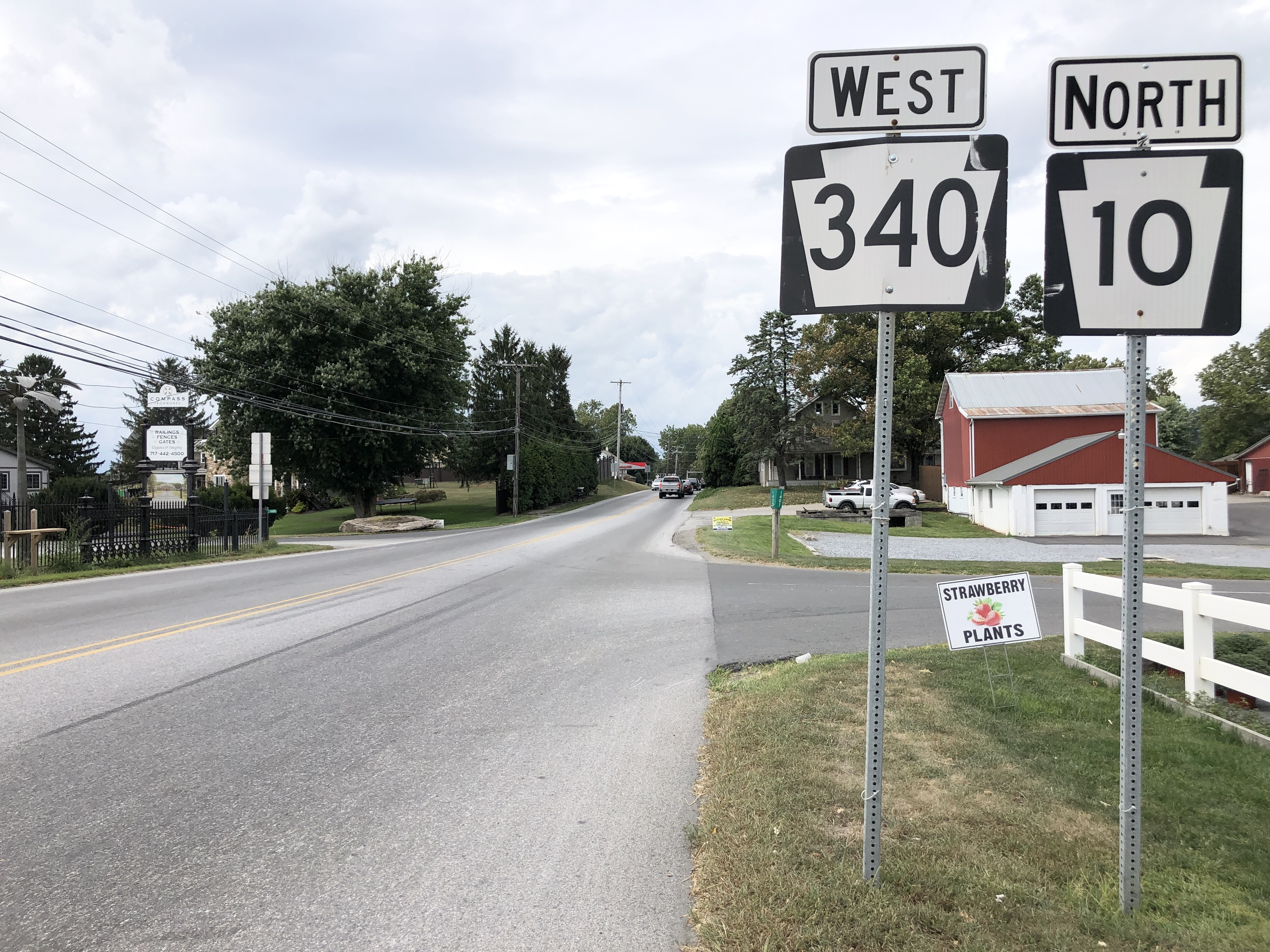
PA 10 northbound and PA 340 westbound in West Caln Township

As of 2020, there were 81.00 miles (130.36 km) of public roads in West Caln Township, of which 14.90 miles (23.98 km) were maintained by the Pennsylvania Department of Transportation (PennDOT) and 66.10 miles (106.38 km) were maintained by the township.

U.S. Route 30 is the most prominent road passing through West Caln Township, but only passes through the southern corner briefly without any interchanges. Pennsylvania Route 10 follows Octorara Trail, Kings Highway and Compass Road along a north–south alignment across the western portion of the township. Pennsylvania Route 340 follows Kings Highway along an east–west alignment across the south-central portion of the township, sharing a brief concurrency with PA 10.
