= Mike Jensen (internet pioneer) =

South African information network expert

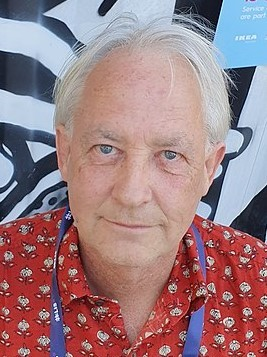
- Born: 1958 (age 67–68); Johannesburg, South Africa
- Occupation: Computer scientist
- Years active: 35
- Known for: Internet pioneer, developing connectivity for the non-profit sector; member of the Internet Hall of Fame

Mike Jensen (born 1958) is a South African ICT expert who was inducted into the Internet Hall of Fame as a "Global Connector" in 2017. He is particularly known for his work to build networks connecting the non-profit sector and for assisting developing countries to establish network connectivity.

== Education ==
Jensen grew up in Johannesburg in South Africa, the son of Anton Jensen and Berrell Jensen (née Jay), a contemporary sculptor. He studied biology at Queen's University Belfast from 1976 – 80 and, as a post-graduate at the University of Guelph in Canada, specialized in acid-rain pollution research. However, he began to question the value of writing scientific papers that seemed to have little impact on policy making. At that time the Reagan administration in the USA was denying the linkage between pollution and acid rain and Jensen started to write about pollution for student newspapers. After receiving his MSc he returned to South Africa and was, for a time, a technology journalist on the anti-apartheid Rand Daily Mail.

== Early innovations ==
When the Rand Daily Mail closed down in 1985 due to its inability to attract advertisers as a paper that targeted both black and white readers, Jensen decided to emigrate to Canada. In 1982, while studying for his MSc, he had been introduced to the CoSy online messaging system. CoSy was being developed by the University of Guelph and was subsequently selected in 1985 by Byte magazine for that magazine's BYTE Information eXchange, a networked bulletin board. While he waited in Toronto for his Canadian immigration clearance in 1986, Jensen opened a computer account at the University of Toronto that was using Usenet newsgroups for online discussions and information sharing. He had started volunteering with the Ontario Environmental Network (OEN) and wondered whether something similar to Usenet could be put together for environmental groups.

Jensen set up a multi-user network for the OEN, using a cheap personal computer and a PC-based version of the Unix operating system, thereby offering the potential for cheaper internet access than that provided by commercial mainframe systems. Together with Kirk Roberts, he founded an Internet service provider for the non-profit sector, known as "The Web". Subsequently called Web Networks, “The Web” predated the World Wide Web by three years and provided cheaper internet access for NGOs than any commercial systems available at the time. The emergence of similar movements elsewhere, such as the Institute for Global Communications (IGC Internet) in California and GreenNet in London, led to the formation of an International NGO computer network. Web Networks was a founding member of the Association for Progressive Communications (APC), established in 1992, which provides ICT policy advice and support for non-profits and similar groups and with which Jensen continues to maintain close contact.

In the early days of internet, technicians had to travel to install software and to programme code to allow different systems to communicate with each other. Jensen was one of several who travelled extensively to install software and work with local technicians to link NGO networks to APC, using a "mother system" based on that in use at IGC Internet. He worked with Pegasus Networks in Australia, and with Micro-computing for Non-Governmental Organizations (MANGO) in southern Africa, where he started to use the Fidonet bulletin-board system, which proved effective to use with the poor phone lines available in much of Africa. This innovation then took him to GreenNet in London in order to upgrade the APC system to enable the smaller NGOs using Fidonet to gateway with the APC hosts, allowing them to use directly email services and information newsgroups offered by APC members. He then returned to South Africa to install a gateway at WorkNet, the South Africa APC partner that had been set up in 1987. By the end of 1991, Jensen and others had helped join seven African countries to the APC network.

== Subsequent career ==
Jensen then worked in other African countries to provide advice to development agencies, such as NGOs, governments, and the private sector in the development of ICT projects. His activities, which have taken him to over 45 countries in Africa and elsewhere, have ranged from ICT policy development at the national level to international fibre and rural wireless telecommunication feasibility studies. His clients have included the World Bank, the African Development Bank, the UK Department for International Development, the World Food Programme, and the Global Libraries initiative of the Bill and Melinda Gates Foundation. He has also worked with the Internet Society and with the Association for Progressive Communications (APC) as Access Specialist, responsible for coordinating policy, research, advocacy, capacity building, and communications on access. He was a member of the African Conference of Ministers' High-Level Working Group, which developed the African Information Society Initiative (AISI). He has provided advice on cross-border fibre provision in Africa and, more recently, has carried out studies of national broadband deployment in Brazil and a study of the benefits of promoting infrastructure-sharing to lower the cost of access. He has also developed national analog-to-digital TV migration strategies.

== Internet Hall of Fame ==
In 2017 Jensen, was inducted into the Internet Hall of Fame as a "Global Connector". In 2012 he had served as a member of the Advisory Board to choose the first inductees to the Hall of Fame, who included Al Gore, Tim Berners-Lee, Linus Torvalds and Jimmy Wales.

== Publications ==
Jensen's publications include:

- The community telecentre cookbook for Africa: Recipes for self-sustainability. 2001.
- Promoting the Use of Internet Exchange Points: A Guide to Policy, Management, and Technical Issues. 2012.
- Towards financial sustainability in community-based networks. 2018.
