= Social media use in the Philippines =

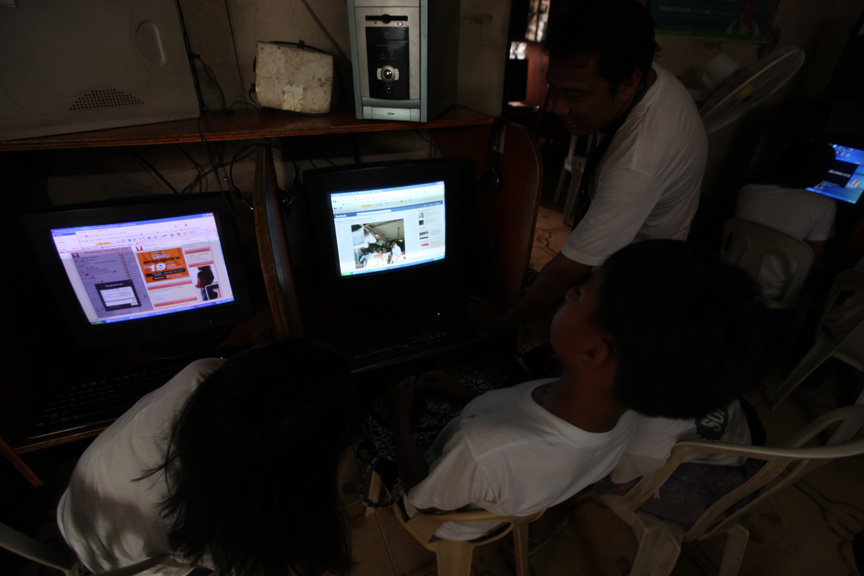
Patrons of an internet café browsing a social media site.

Social networking is one of the most active web-based activities in the Philippines, with Filipinos being declared as the most active users on a number of web-based social media sites such as Facebook, Instagram, Snapchat, and Twitter. The use of social networking websites has become so extensive in the Philippines that the country has been tagged as "The Social Media Capital of the World," and has also become part of Filipino Internet culture. Subsequently, social media is also used in the Philippines as a form of election campaign material, as well as tools to aid criminal investigation.

== History ==
Friendster is one of the first social networking websites in the World Wide Web when it was introduced in 2002. However, its popularity in the United States plummeted quickly in 2004 due to massive technical problems and server delays. But as it was losing its American audience, Friendster slowly gained users from Southeast Asia starting in the Philippines. Friendster director of engineering Chris Lunt wondered why its web traffic was spiking in the middle of the night, and noticed that the traffic was coming from the Philippines. He then traced the trail to a Filipino-American marketing consultant and hypnotist named Carmen Leilani de Jesus as the first user to have introduced Friendster to the Philippines, where a number of her friends live.

== Statistics ==
A study released by Universal McCann entitled "Power to the People – Wave3" declared the Philippines as "the social networking capital of the world," with 83 percent of Filipinos surveyed are members of a social network. They are also regarded as the top photo uploaders and web video viewers, while they are second when it comes to the number of blog readers and video uploaders.

=== Friendster ===
With over 7.9 million Filipinos using the Internet, 6.9 million of them visit a social networking site at least once a month. At times, Friendster has been the most visited website in the Philippines, as well as in Indonesia, according to web tracking site Alexa. David Jones, vice president for global marketing of Friendster, said that "the biggest percentage of (their site's) users is from the Philippines, clocking in with 39 percent of the site's traffic." He further added that in March 2008 alone, Friendster recorded 39 million unique visitors, with 13.2 million of whom were from the Philippines.

=== Multiply ===
Meanwhile, Multiply president and founder Peter Pezaris said that the Filipino users of their site comprised the largest and most active group in terms of number of subscribers and of photographs being uploaded daily. About 2.2 million out of more than nine million registered users of Multiply are Filipinos, outnumbering even nationalities with a bigger population base like the United States, Indonesia, and Brazil. Also, one million photographs are uploaded by Filipinos to Multiply every day, which is half of their total number worldwide. Sixty percent of Filipino users of Multiply are female, while 70 percent are under the age of 25. In comparison, Filipino Friendster users are between the ages of 16 and 30, with 55 percent of them female.

=== Facebook ===
We Are Social’s Digital 2020 report revealed that Facebook is the most popular social media platform in the Philippines, used by 96 percent of the country's internet users. This was followed by YouTube by 95 percent and Facebook Messenger by 89 percent.

Since Facebook’s initial launch of its first Philippine office in 2016, there were already an estimated 49 million Filipinos using the social networking site. Due to Facebook's popularity among Filipino users, in May 2018, the company opened its new head office in Bonifacio Global City, Taguig and initiated a 4 billion USD e-commerce opportunity to help small and medium-sized local businesses.

=== TikTok ===
In 2023, the Philippines ranked 8th of the top countries with an estimated highest number of TikTok users according to global statistics. As of 2025, there has been an estimated 40 million TikTok users in the Philippines.

== Application in Filipino culture and society ==
The popularity of social networking in the Philippines can be traced in the Filipinos' culture of "friends helping friends." For Filipinos, their friends and who they know can become more valuable than money, especially when what they need can be achieved through nepotism, favoritism, and friendship among others.

Social networking has extensive uses in the Philippines. It was used to promote television programs like Pinoy Big Brother: Teen Edition Plus with its two profiles on Multiply. A call center company posted job openings on its Multiply community site and was able to attract recruits. The power of social networking was tested in the country's 2007 general elections when senatorial candidate Francis Escudero created his own Friendster profile to bolster support from Filipino users. He eventually won a seat in the Senate. Local celebrities and politicians have since created their own profiles on Friendster as their medium to communicate with their fans and constituents.

Friendster was also used as a tool for police investigations. Local police in Cebu City were able to track down the suspects for the robbery and murder of a female nursing student in March 2008. After receiving information and tips from the public and other police operatives, the local police searched through the suspects' profiles in order to get a closer look at their faces. The police printed the pictures of the suspects and launched a series of police operations, which led to their arrest. Meanwhile, Manila Police District arrested a suspect for the murder of two guest relations officers in Tondo in January 2007 after they were able to find the suspect's whereabouts through his Friendster profile.

Social networks also became a source of high-profile cyberwars, notably between actors Ynez Veneracion and Mon Confiado against Juliana Palermo. The two accused Palermo of creating a fake Friendster profile of her ex-boyfriend Confiado, which is uploaded with photos of Confiado and his girlfriend Veneracion but laden with profanities in each caption.

For his bid for the Philippine presidency in May 2010, then Secretary of National Defense, Gilberto Teodoro launched an aggressive campaign via the social media. He capitalized on networks such as YouTube and Facebook. He reportedly spent nearly a quarter of his campaign budget on the social media in the Philippines; in comparison to the 15th Philippine president's Benigno Simeon Aquino III – 9%.

In 2024 based from the Reuters Institute Digital News Report (DNR), Facebook's use among Filipino adults for news decreased from 72% in 2023 to 61%, an 11-point drop, exceeding the average 4-point decline seen in other media markets. The 13th edition of DNR based their data on an online survey with 94,943 adults from 47 media markets, including 2,104 Filipinos.

== Social media as court evidence ==
Although the Rules on Electronic Evidence, promulgated by the Supreme Court in 2001, did not explicitly state that messages and photos from social media can be used as court evidence, proof of criminal acts are allowed to be presented as such.

The court, in a decision dated November 16, 2021 and publicized on June 17, 2022, ruled that photos and messages obtained by individuals from a social media account can be used as court evidence. The court denied a petitioner's plea to exclude the chat thread from his Facebook Messenger, which was presented as evidence against him by a minor, claiming violation of his right to privacy, thus upholding the Court of Appeals decision for his conviction for violating the Anti-Child Pornography Act (Republic Act No. 9775).

Furthermore, processing of personal information is allowed by the Data Privacy Act (RA No. 10173) provided that it will be used to determine a criminal liability; in that case, the court held that the restrictions under the law are not applicable to the accused.

== Issues ==
Filipino-American Internet personality Christine Gambito, also known as HappySlip, criticized Friendster for displaying what she described as "inappropriate advertisements" that appear on her profile. She posted a message on the site's bulletin board addressing her fans that she contemplated deleting her account. Gambito had earlier deleted her MySpace account because she objected to the Google-powered online advertisements that she said "were in direct conflict with the HappySlip brand and especially misrepresentative of Filipino women." She particularly criticized the posting of advertisements of international dating websites that supposedly target Filipinas.

Meanwhile, Philippine National Police Director General Avelino Razon ordered the Criminal Investigation and Detection Group to find out who created a fake account on Friendster using his identity. The profile was laden with false information about him, saying that he "wants to meet traitors, corrupts, criminals so he could crush them."

As of December 2008, there have been cases of spam comments in Friendster profiles, most of which are in the form of a JPEG image masquerading as an embedded YouTube video, with a thumbnail of a sexually explicit video clip, such as a girl undressing herself or something similar. Clicking on the image usually results in a redirect to a dubious or disreputable website, or worse, a drive-by download of malware, such as the Koobface worm. Because some of the users, especially teenagers, who usually log on to the site in an Internet café, have only limited knowledge about malware and/or computers in general, such social engineering attacks can be a significant risk. The site had received considerable criticism due to this issue.

=== Cambridge Analytica data scandal ===
In 2018, the Philippine government investigated a data breach by British firm Cambridge Analytica over which 87 million Facebook accounts' personal information were stolen. A letter was sent by the Philippines' National Privary Commission to Facebook CEO Mark Zuckerberg to provide documents in the scope and its impact on "Filipino data subjects." 1.2 million of these Facebook accounts breached came from the Philippines. According to Cambridge Analytica whistleblower Christopher Wylie in an interview with Rappler, the Philippines was an easy target because of the lack of regulation, corrupt officials, and high usage of social media among Filipinos.

=== Fake news and misinformation ===
In the Philippines, there has been concerns regarding the spread of fake news and misinformation on social media, especially on platforms such as Facebook. Filipino president Rodrigo Duterte used Facebook, popular among 97 percent of Filipino internet users, to share his message and attack dissenters. Since his May 2016 election, Duterte has built a network of Facebook personalities and bloggers to undermine political opponents.

Strategic Communications Laboratories or SCL Group, parent company of Cambridge Analytica, helped Duterte win the 2016 presidential election, as stated on their website, by portraying him as a crime fighter on social media.

=== Campaigns for responsible use of social media ===
In July 2011, GMA Network creates the new campaign Think Before You Click – a campaign by GMA News to promote responsible use of social media. In August 2016, Rappler initiated a similar campaign called "#NoPlaceForHate" – a campaign which encourages civility when engaging online.

=== Deepfakes ===
DICT Secretary Henry Aguda sent a correspondence to Meta Platforms CEO Mark Zuckerberg in July 2025, compelling him to establish more content moderation teams in the Philippines and to immediately take down deepfake content to shield users from disinformation. While he hoped that Meta would comply to the government's request, Aguda noted in an interview with DZBB-AM that Meta's failure to comply may lead to the government suspending Facebook in the country, similar to the accountability approaches in Brazil and other countries.

=== Data privacy ===
On September 22, 2026, the National Privacy Commission (NPC) called out Meta Platforms, Roblox Corporation, Discord Inc., and Reddit Inc.. They pointed out that these firms failed to comply with the registration rules set by the Data Privacy Act of 2012 and the NPC Circular 16-03. The agency would assess how these platforms uphold "strict rules on registration, transparency, data subject rights, accountability, and physical and technical security safeguards". Show cause orders had been sent by NPC demanding explanations from the companies, with the agency emphasizing the "shared responsibility" between the tech companies, educators, parents, and government in ensuring safety of minors.

== Regulation proposals ==
=== Congressional franchise requirement ===
To combat the spread of disinformation, Surigao del Norte 2nd District Representative Ace Barbers proposed in 2025 a law obliging social media platforms to seek mandatory legislative franchise. He claimed it would guarantee "discipline, a code of conduct, and ethics [in platforms]". Quezon 2nd District Representative David "Jayjay" Suarez filed House Bill No. 4786 that would subject social media platforms to congressional oversight by designating them as "public services of significant public consequence". He claimed this would intensify the content moderation procedures of the platforms, thereby making the children safe online. The renewed proposal came after three school shootings in the country.

Both associate professor Karl Patrick Mendoza of the Polytechnic University of the Philippines and Danilo Arao of the University of the Philippines warned that franchise proposals could risk compromising the freedom of speech in the country, and suggested bigger budget allocation for enhanced media education and literacy.

=== Physical presence of social media companies ===
In a 2026 interview with the ABS-CBN News Channel, Department of Information and Communications Technology (DICT) Undersecretary Atty. Leonido Pulido III asserted that social media platforms that operate in the Philippines must establish their physical presences. This would ensure cooperation between the government and the platforms in regulating the content.

Both Discord and Reddit vowed to establish their respective local offices in the country and to strengthen their measures on child safety, according to the Cybercrime Investigation and Coordinating Center (CICC). This included "green lanes" or direct communication channels that would allow the authorities to track down content deemed harmful to children. CICC earlier warned that both platforms would be restricted if they failed to establish local presence that would "enhance coordination and cooperation with Philippine authorities", and if they failed to submit satisfactory strategies on "enhanced safety standards, rapid-response mechanisms, and age-verification or age-assurance measures". Democracy.Net.PH likened the warning to the Chinese Great Firewall model and argued that only courts could restrict Internet freedoms.

=== Restricting minors ===
At the start of the 20th Congress of the Philippines, Senator Panfilo Lacson proposed a legislative measure seeking to prohibit children aged 18 and below from using social media. He cited a study from the UNICEF concerning the exposure of the minors to online harassment and cyberbullying. Under his proposal, social media companies are expected to verify the age and identity of the netizens, though they must ensure the security of the data in compliance with the Data Privacy Act of 2012. Failure to block underaged users or to secure user data may lead to either steep fines or being permanently banned from operating in the country.

On March 3, 2026, House Bill No. 8262 was filed in the House of Representatives proposing a ban on social media use by individuals under 16 years old, with the aim of regulating minor's access to online platforms.

There were renewed calls to introduce a social media ban for minors in the aftermath of the deadly 2026 Tacloban school shooting, and legislators have also proposed mandatory age verification for "violent and mature-rated online games". These proposals resurfaced after the 2026 Ateneo de Zamboanga University shooting, which resulted in the deaths of an underaged victim and the underaged suspect, as well as in the aftermath of the 2026 South Cotabato school shooting.

Reception

On July 29, 2026, child rights organization Save the Children supported the efforts made by the Philippine National Police but cautioned against any blanket ban for minors. They asserted the Australian measures faced challenges, including "technical limitations in enforcement, privacy concerns over age verification, and the risk of children migrating to less regulated online platforms".

Senator Juan Miguel Zubiri, in a post on X (formerly known as Twitter) a day after the Zamboanga school shooting, reiterated his support for "a serious social media ban for children" citing the need for the laws to "catch up" in response to the "changing times".

Senator Risa Hontiveros, in criticizing the Safe Media Access and Responsible Technology for Kids in Digital Spaces (SMART KIDS) Act which was affirmed by the rest of her colleagues, asserted that total bans "do not recognize the developmental and evolving capacities of children". She suggested "tiered restrictions for adolescents" from stronger data privacy settings to restrictions on both advertising algorithms and contacts with adults. The proposed measure sought to ban users aged 17 and below from using or maintaining accounts on social media.

=== User identity verification ===
The SIM Registration Act (or Republic Act No. 11934) became effective in 2022. An earlier version of the then-bill required Philippines-based users to register their social media accounts using their legal names and phone numbers, with the supporters claiming the measure would deter fraudulent and terrorist activities that use anonymity. Opponents criticized the measure as endangering the freedom of speech and privacy rights of the Filipinos. The social media provision was eventually removed from the final version of the bill that later became law.

On January 16, 2026, Department of Information and Communications Technology (DICT) proposed a policy mandating the social media platforms to verify their users, as a measure to combat trolls, AI bots, and cybercriminal activities. Internet rights groups Democracy.Net.PH and Foundation for Media Alternatives warned that such measure could bring unwanted harm to activists, women, and children in the forms of bullying, harassment, and cyberstalking. DICT later backtracked on the proposal and opted for public awareness and information campaign instead, still fulfilling the same goal of cyberspace accountability.

On February 6, 2026, Senator Tito Sotto proposed legislation for a "one person, one account" policy, claiming that it would help eliminate "internet trolls". His proposal came in the aftermath of an increase of online trolling on the issue of the territorial dispute between China and the Philippines after the diplomatic incident between the two countries.

DICT said on September 1, 2026, that they would mandate Meta Platforms to integrate the Philippine national identity card in verifying the identity of their users of their social media platforms, which comprise Facebook, Messenger, Instagram, WhatsApp, and Threads, in a similar manner as the measure promised by Roblox to implement. DICT Secretary Henry Aguda asserted that verifying the accounts of social media users would discourage criminals from hiding their identities whenever they "commit something illegal" online, arguing that "attribution" had become "difficult". He argued that proactive identity verification measures would help prevent online platforms from facing prospective class action suits like the lawsuits in the United States that Meta had faced. DICT also proposed "tighter rules" on Discord, which they characterized as "an unmonitored or encrypted messaging space that is reportedly being used for radicalization". The Computer Professionals' Union (CPU) criticized this proposed measure on Meta Platforms and described it as a "direct attack on the basic human right to privacy". They suggested the following alternative measures: "accessible mental health services, comprehensive digital literacy programs integrated into educational systems, and stricter gun controls".

=== General warnings ===
On August 27, 2026, the Malacañang Palace cautioned all social media platforms as well as "other platforms" like "gaming apps" that they might face restrictions in the country if they fail to stop the spread of online content that could potentially cause the children to turn "violent and aggressive". On September 25, they asserted that President Bongbong Marcos was ready to show a "strong political will" in suspending the services of "select mobile apps and social media platforms" if they fail to ensure the "safety of school students", even if it meant "sacrifices" for several Filipino users. The access could only be restored if those platforms "comply with the government rules for the protection of children". Palace Spokesperson Claire Castro likened the online groomers to "demons possessing the young minds of the children".
