= ComLink, Germany =

German online networks

ComLink
- Type: Organisation
- Purpose: Building networks for online communication of the alternative sector
- Region served: Germany

ComLink, Germany was one of the earlier organizations involved in building networks for online communication of the alternative sector in Germany.

According to an essay titled In the beginning there was FIDO, "Fidonet gateways were installed at WebNetworks (Canada), IGC (United States), GreenNet (UK), Laneta (Mexico), Comlink (Germany), Nordnet (Sweden) and Worknet/Sangonet (South Africa)." The CL network was a collection of Internet forums based on Usenet technology, which were also accessible via several web portals and via RSS web feed . In terms of content, the CL network was committed to grassroots journalism and concepts of left-wing counterpublicity . A volunteer editorial team sifted through incoming press releases, reports and contributions from users and the media and made them available, sorted by department.

The German Wikipedia page - see translation below - notes that the decision to switch off the network was made in 2015.

The following content is translated from the corresponding article in German Wikipedia

== CL network ==
At the beginning of the 1990s, the network was the first significant infrastructure for computer networking of peace, human rights and environmental groups and organizations in German-speaking countries and thus preceded the spread of the Internet by several years. It arose from text-based, mostly privately operated mailbox systems, into which you could dial directly using a modem via a telephone connection. Many of the mailbox systems used the “Zerberus” software and also participated in the Z-Netz, which made it possible to connect the mailbox systems into a common network. Technically, the CL network was an “overlay network” of the Z network, which means that it consisted of a few boards (corresponding to today's newsgroups ) that were transported on the Z network nodes. The first systems included Bionic from Bielefeld, founded in 1987, LINKS from Munich (which became LINK-M ) and OLN from Hanover, founded in 1988.

The CL network was created in 1991 from the merger of the two networks Compost and LinkSysteme, from which the artificial word ComLink, abbreviated CL (later interpreted as computer network Linksysteme ) was formed. The merger was necessary in order to ensure organizational connection to the international networks. The CL network became the German-speaking partner of the international Association for Progressive Communications (APC) with networks in the USA, Latin America, Australia, Scandinavia, the Soviet Union and other regions.

The CL network was most widely used around 1996. At that time, it was accessible via more than 200 dial-up systems in German-speaking countries and in some other countries (Turkey, Italy, the Balkans).

Because of its success, right-wing extremist groups such as the NPD, particularly the Young National Democrats, attempted to infiltrate the CL network. [1]

In 2007, the CL network celebrated its 20th anniversary with a conference entitled “Who owns the Internet?”, for which conference proceedings were published in 2008. [2]

At the end of the 1990s, the CL network lost its position in favor of platforms such as indymedia or politik-digital, partly due to long-standing rejection of the more open, but also more uncontrollable and, from the perspective of the time, cost-intensive access technology “Internet” (or “ web browser ”) . The number of classic mailbox systems that can be dialed via modem fell to less than a dozen between 2000 and 2005. Such a system still existed in 2012. The CL network with its forums can now be used via websites.

On January 15, 2015 it was announced that the CL network would be switched off. [3] The option to submit new articles is scheduled to no longer be offered at the end of March 2015, while contributions made until then will continue to be accessible via the website in the sense of an archive. The decision was justified by the “political benefits” that had diminished by then, which were no longer in proportion to the time and costs involved. Today, political networking is accomplished through other means.

== Technology and international networking ==
When it was founded, the CL network was based almost exclusively on individual, networked mailbox systems that worked according to the ZConnect standard and exchanged private and public messages according to the store-and-forward principle. International networking began in 1990 through the “Association for progressive communications” using this inexpensive technology, which was also used in the countries of the former Eastern Bloc, in Latin America and the African continent.

As early as 1988, emails and news could be sent and received across networks. In August 1989, news from a civil rights group in the GDR reached the Internet. The international peace movement began to use the Internet early on. In 1991, during the coup in Moscow, there was a regular communication connection to the partner network “GlasNet” via decentralized mailbox systems in Belarus, Estonia and Finland (see also: END Convention ).

== Content ==
In addition to the possibility of exchanging emails, long before the advent of the Internet, participants were able to exchange messages via public forums, which were then called boards in the CL network. Many politically active organizations, groups and individuals saw the new possibilities of electronic communication as an advantage for their work. However, the CL network systems also had to deal with the skepticism of this target group towards modern technology.

From 1989 onwards, Amnesty International 's (ai) “urgent actions” were disseminated via the CL network. Since the German section of ai had reservations about IT, a volunteer had to retype the texts that were already stored electronically at ai on paper. It was only after a few years that direct data exchange was possible.

During the civil war in the former Yugoslavia, the CL/EUROPA/BALKANS section contained daily news in German, Serbo-Croatian or English, written by peace groups in Zagreb, Belgrade and Ljubljana from the “ZAMIR” network (Serbo-Croatian: za mir = for peace ). This network connected many thousands of people and also enabled communication between the different parts of the former Yugoslavia between which telephone connections had been severed. The Dutch peace activist Wam Kat wrote his “Zagreb Diary” on a daily basis, creating an early forerunner of today's blogs . [4]

The CL network, which like the Z network was organized on a grassroots democratic basis, offered relief for people with disabilities from the start because the forums were text-based. There have been separate forums since 1990 and, from 1992, separate seminars for the hearing-impaired and deaf, for the visually impaired and the blind. Wheelchair users were among the first users of the CL network.

Another focus was the documentation of right-wing extremist and xenophobic incidents. The right-wing extremist scene therefore monitored the CL network very closely and at times tried to copy it with their own mailboxes ( Thule network ).

Since the CL network was founded by journalists and many of the employees worked as journalists, it was important to separate information and opinion . For each “board” there was a “discussion board”. In fact, this interruption of the thread irritated users; The process could not be consistently maintained despite various technical auxiliary structures.

The CL network was organized on a grassroots democratic basis. Everyone involved worked largely on a voluntary basis. As with many other mailbox networks, long strategic discussions about alignment, openness and financing took place at the coordination level of the CL network.

Due to the loose networking, members of the major parties and their youth organizations worked in the CL network, as did members of environmental or human rights initiatives. Since members of various left-wing splinter groups were also reading and writing, the CL network came into the sights of the Office for the Protection of the Constitution. [6]

end of extract from German wikipedia
