= Chat Garcia Ramilo =

Women's rights activist

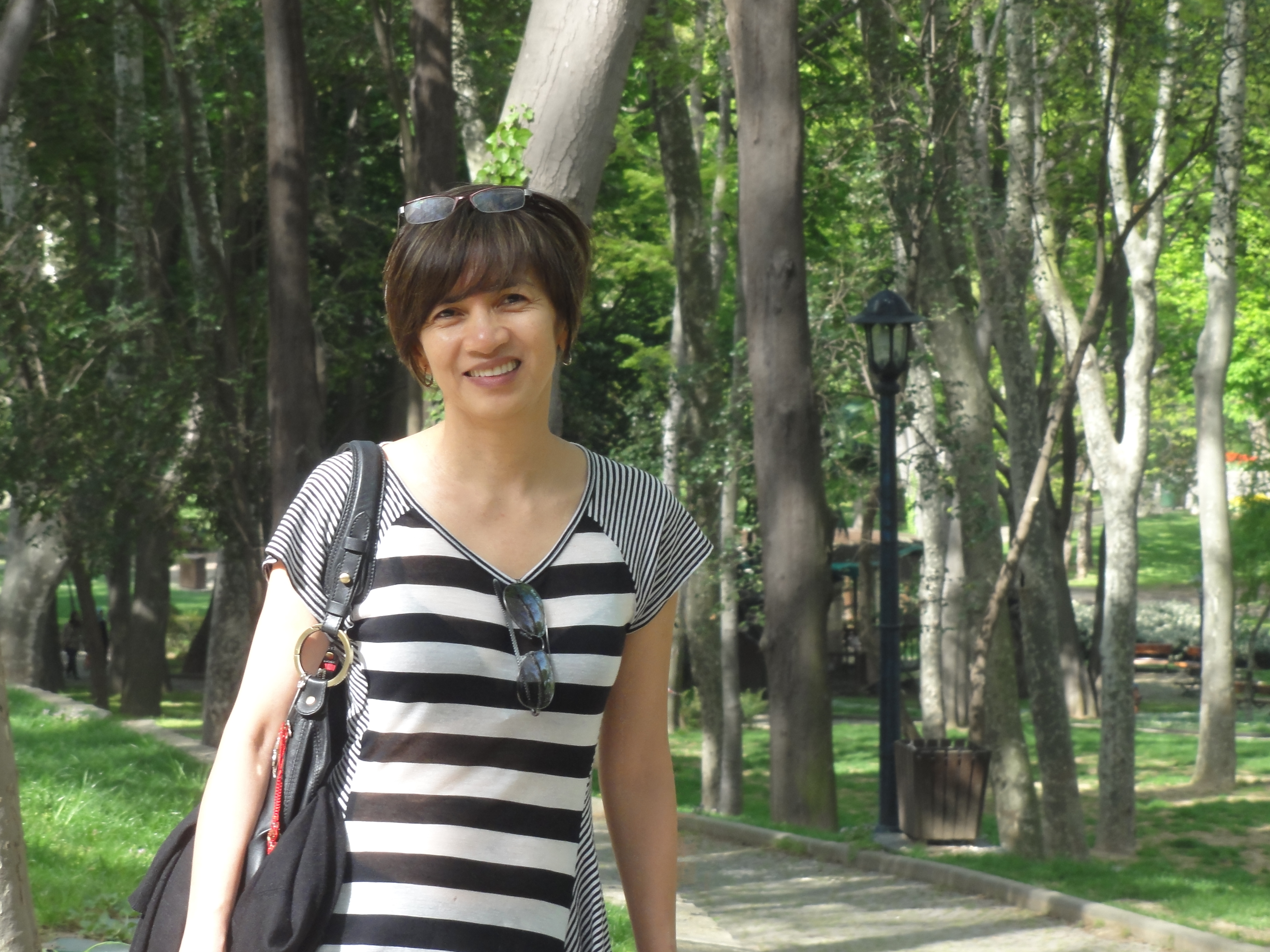
- Occupation: APC Women's Rights Programme
- Years active: 1980s - present
- Known for: Information and communications technology pioneer Philippines

Chat Garcia Ramilo (born 1960, Philippines) is a feminist activist. She has over twenty years experience in different activities with Information and communications technology (ICT). Since April 2017, she leads the Association for Progressive Communications (APC). She is the Board Chair of the Center for Migrant Advocacy in the Philippines and a Board Member of the Association for Women's Rights in Development (AWID).

== Career ==
Garcia Ramilo is the Board Chair of the Center for Migrant Advocacy in the Philippines. She has served as a gender expert for various ICT for development initiatives and institutions such as the World Bank and the United Nations Division for the Advancement of Women.

Chat Garcia Ramilo became the executive director of the Association for Progressive Communications after serving as manager of its Communications Women's Rights Programme for seven years. She manages gender evaluation methodologies and she co-authored Gender Evaluation Methodologies for Internet and ICTs (GEM), which has been used by organisations in over 25 countries.

She is a co-founder of the Take Back the Tech! campaign, which addresses digital gender violence through technology.

== Publications ==
- Angela Kuga Thas, Chat Garcia Ramilo and Dafne Sabanes Plou, Facilitators Guide for GEM Workshops, Association for Progressive Communications (2010).
- Chat Ramilo and Cheekay Cinco. Gender and Evaluation Methodology for Internet and ICTs: A learning Tool for Change and Empowerment, APC Women's Networking Support Programme (2005).
- Chat Ramilo, Nancy Hafkin and Sonia Jorge. Gender equality and empowerment of women through ICT, United Nations Division for the Advancement of Women (2005).
- Chat Ramilo, Sonia Jorge and Wati Hermawati. Engendering Rural Information System in Indonesia, The World Bank, Rural Development and Natural Resources Unit, East Asia and the Pacific Region (2005).
