= Online gender-based violence =

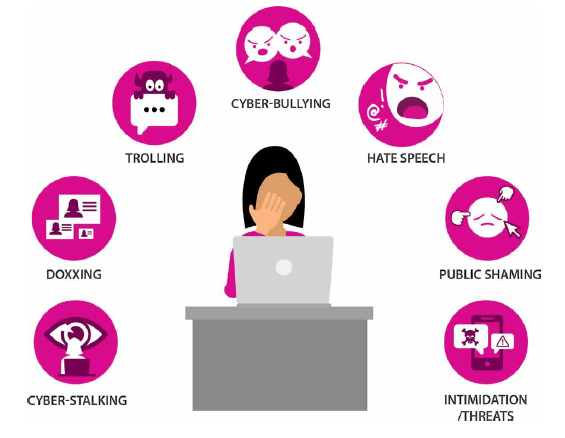
A graphic created by UNESCO to demonstrate some of the forms of harassment that women experience online.

Online gender-based violence is targeted harassment and prejudice through technology against people based on their gender. The term is also similar to technology facilitated gender-based violence, digital violence, online harassment, cyberbullying and cybersexism, but the latter terms are not gender-specific. Gender-based harassment differs from these because of the attention it draws to discrimination and online violence targeted specifically because of their gender.

Online harassment is not new but a continuation of longstanding gendered hierarchies and prejudice against marginalised groups. For women, queer individuals, and other marginalized gender identities online engagement carries both heightened risks and opportunities for resistance. Many face hyper-visibility, systemic erasure, and coordinated harassment, as seen in India with feminist journalists targeted for their gender and religious identities, or in Africa where LGBTQ+ activists navigate state censorship and platform invisibility.

Digital spaces also enable collective action and solidarity: movements like #PinjraTod and #MeTooIndia, Latin American cyberfeminist initiatives, and African LGBTQ+ networks use social media, encryption, and participatory storytelling to challenge oppression, build community, and document injustice.

== Forms ==
Online gender-based violence can include unwanted sexual remarks, non-consensual circulation or distribution of sexually explicit media or content, threats, doxing, cyberstalking and harassment, online gendered disinformation, deepfakes, and gender-based discriminatory memes and posts among other things. Online gender-based violence derives from gender-based violence but it is perpetuated through electronic means.

Online gender-based violence may occur through various ways. These include impersonation, hacking, spamming, tracking and surveillance, malicious sharing of intimate messages and photos. Since the introduction of the internet, the presence of online gender-based violence has grown exponentially. One common space where online gender-based violence occurs is in the blogosphere. This is a male-dominated space where female bloggers are criticized at a higher rate than male bloggers. There are frequently comments under female-written blogs which are sexually violent in nature or disrespectful.

A common place where online gender-based violence takes place is in the form of trolling. This includes derogatory comments and sexist, inflammatory comments. This is online gender-based violence masked as a harmless, aimless activity. It also includes cyber-sexism played off as humorous and harmless when in reality it reinforces harmful stereotypes, violence, and gender-based power structures that dominant both the offline and online world. Memes are another form through which online gender-based violence is spread. These are images created to present sexist and transphobic jokes, sexual violence, and gender stereotypes while playing it off as simply something humorous. Examples of these can be harmful online terms or derogatory memes like stereotyping wojaks and comic art.

== Types ==
Within the broader definition, there are various types of online gender-based violence. One type is online domestic violence, where perpetrators use the internet to exploit the intimate and private knowledge that they have of their partner in order to hurt them. They also use intimate photos and videos to assert power and violence over their partner. In this, perpetuators may also anonymously send unwanted and inappropriate images to victims with the aim of enticing them to share their own images as well, which they may in turn use to blackmail them; this is referred to as cyberflashing.

Research by Sameer Hinduja and Justin Patchin have studied this phenomenon, which they term "digital dating abuse," finding that 28% of students in a romantic relationship the previous year had been victimized in this manner. Males (32%) were victimized more often, compared to females (24%), and experiencing offline dating violence was the strongest identified correlate of online dating violence. Other key findings included links to depression, sexting, and cyberbullying victimization.

Cyberstalking is another type of online gender-based violence. It has been reported that 26% of women aged 18–24 have reported being stalked through the use of telecommunication tools afforded by the internet and social media. A recent systematic literature review by Puneet Kaur et al., identified that the prevalence of cyberstalking is unclear, with empirical studies identifying rates as low as 6.5% and as high as 46%; this wide variation is likely due to divergent sampling methodologies, conceptualization and operationalization of the term, reticence in reporting, and even differences across demographic groups.

== Causes ==
Online gender-based violence emerges from misogyny and transphobia in physical spaces and the cultural norms that guide our lives. Accepted forms of gender-based violence includes in-person contact such as: intimate partner violence, street harassment, rape, and others described in violence against women. All of these have resulted in the creation of online forms of gender-based violence. Other causes of violence include the practices of online communities and lack of regulations that address gender-specific harassment and violence in these communities.

=== Cultural ===
The societal acceptance of norms that are deemed 'prejudiced' has a large impact on the prevalence of gender-based violence online. Cultural norms and beliefs are carried from physical communities into online spaces by celebrities who engage in this behavior in person or who openly agree with it. This can be specified to women and misogyny Through cultural causes, scholars claim that rather than technology creating violence online, it simply provides a new platform which users adapt to suit their desired action, some of which may include acts such as doxing, threatening, or stalking.

Culture can also influence the popularity of violent activity against marginalized groups when these behaviors are perpetrated or normalized by celebrities and pop culture. This is also true when acts of gender violence are normalized against female celebrities and public figures. These cultural causes can have large or small impacts depending on the identity of the victim or the context. For instance, acts of gender-based violence may be more common in fields such as politics where strong ideologies about women's roles and misogyny are already present. This would include cases where the victim is working in politics or the threats and violent behavior came as a response to a political post.

=== Algorithmic ===
Although cultural norms are one cause of gender violence that can attract some actors to perpetrate these behaviors, online algorithms and behavior can bring about another factor that causes violent behavior. Public comments on social media applications such as Twitter and Facebook can lead to other users agreeing with and adding their own additional comments. In cases of online harassment, these additional users' actions are caused when the original threat or internet troll comment is perceived as acceptable or when they become normalized and more common in the user's feed. These threads of gendered trolling can be inflated by algorithm behaviors; in many cases online systems "boost" negative posts leading them to reach a larger audience and gain more violent responses. Cases where the violence is instigated and grows because of perceptions of lawlessness as well as cases where online algorithms are responsible for the growth in harassment are both examples of how gender-based violence can be instigated online.

Trends and jokes online can often be at the expense of a woman or transgender person. Trends online can have an underlying misogynistic or transphobic message. Examples can be trends that sexualise women in general or of a certain group or criticise them for their likes and interests. Transphobia also occurs online through trends where identity is erased or overanalysed. AI videos and images have been spread to try to encourage hate and misinformation regarding queer gender identities.

=== Structural ===
Some forms of gender-based violence online are caused by the availability of online spaces for communities with misogynistic and violent ideas about women. Systems which provide online formats such as Reddit or Tor can often become popular among groups with violent ideas or who would like to remain anonymous. Anonymous online spaces allow subcultures like incels to grow. In many of these spaces, misogyny and rape fantasies are commonly discussed and these spaces can teach individuals that violent acts and behavior is acceptable. In some cases, incel forums have had a role in encouraging violent behavior among members. The spread of violent and gendered rhetoric is not isolated to one subculture and can be normalized and taught in a variety of groups.

Structural inequalities that exist at the core of technological landscapes reproduce discriminatory practices geared towards women. Women are being kept offline because of the arguably unsafe digital field that has been cultivated through misogynistic, aggressive, and threatening practices. Schemas that classify women as less valuable generators of knowledge and less relevant actors in social spaces result in knowledge gaps online through the generation of feelings of unsafe spaces online for women to participate. Trends of women and individuals of low socio-economic status producing less content online poses a threat to the democratization of the internet.

=== On Wikipedia ===
Despite its status as the most participatory site on the internet, Wikipedia perpetrates these inequalities and does not serve as a safe knowledge outlet for women. The exacerbation of knowledge gaps harms women by limiting their capacity to contribute to the digital world and prevents social mobility through the lack of access to information regarding female-generated information and biographies.

An example of the perpetuated gender inequality on Wikipedia exists in interpretations of gendered language, particularly on articles about women, in which the use of gendered language (e.g., "female" or "wife") implies a gender binary from which interpretations of heteronormativity are applied to the content of the article itself. Such use of female-gendered language affects the notability of the article in question; an article is considered more notable if gendered language is used in conjunction with a particular achievement (e.g., "first female mayor"). The discussion of the notability of a Wikipedia article also involves its relevance to other context existent on Wikipedia; an article is more likely to be marked for deletion if it lacks hyperlinks to other Wikipedia articles. A Wikipedia article with low notability according to its point of view is more likely to be marked for deletion. Reports of women claiming that editing Wikipedia articles is something that they fear is a critical component of gender-based violence online. Women in Red, a group of editors committed to improving structural inequalities on Wikipedia through the creation of female generated content, describes how efforts for female publication are challenged by being flagged as non-notable and thus nominated for deletion.

Gender inequality on Wikipedia is also exemplified through the reluctance of female editors to edit existing pages. Studies have found that male editors overwhelmingly populate the percentage of Wikipedia page editors at approximately 70-80%. Issues of safety are relevant in this conversation as the small proportion of women who do participate in these edits feel pressured to reside within the "quiet corners" of Wikipedia as a personal precaution. This implies that women choose to integrate their edits within topics and pages that are not prone to harassment by other editors.

== Impact ==
Gender-based violence online can impact the development and mental health of victims in similar ways to physical forms of violence and bullying. Unlike those physically attacked, online formats make it much possible for victims to receive hundreds or thousands of threats and violent comments in a short span of time. This can lead to different effects than would be expected in cases of physical assault or violence. In addition, the impact of online gender-based violence is not experienced uniformly. Intersectional research highlights that racialized women, Indigenous activists, and LGBTQ+ users often face compounded harassment that is shaped by overlapping systems of sexism, racism, and colonialism.

=== Youth experience ===
Among victims who are minors, these experiences and the impacts are similar. Along with the experiences of cyberbullying, young people can experience specific impacts from gendered violence online. This more commonly appears as difficulty forming healthy relationships or trust after receiving violent threats. Young people may also fear for their safety following events of online violence and many become less involved in online communities or in activities out of fear that these actions could lead to further violence against the victim.

=== Adult experiences ===
Acts of violence and harassment online can lead victims to withdraw from social environments, both online and in person. Young women aged 18–24 are far more likely to experience online harassment than older women, most likely due to their level of access and involvement with online communities and causes them to be more likely to experience the negative impacts of online gendered violence. Other impacts victims may experience depression and other mental health issues.

== Gamergate ==
One of the most notorious instances of widespread gender-based violence was Gamergate. Beginning in August 2014, this controversy evolved into a widespread harassment campaign against female-identifying internet users. Proliferated through the hashtag #Gamergate, this controversy shows how at risk female identifying internet users and content creators are to harassment, death threats, and sexually derogatory attacks among other things. These online threats translated into the personal lives of the women being attacked; many were forced to relocate, stay in close contact with the police, and cancel scheduled in-person events. The Gamergate controversy shows how widespread and damaging online gender-based violence is, and how quickly this sort of harassment and abuse is able to spread online. This is also an example of online gender-based violence where women were attacked who were attempting to raise issues regarding online gender-based violence.

== Addressing gender-based harassment ==
=== In the United States ===
The United States Department of State currently has policies which address gender-based violence, but it does not have developed policies regarding online gender-based violence. The United States has not addressed online gender-based violence on a legislative level despite there being a push from activists and internet users for more concrete policies that denounce and decrease the pervasiveness of online gender-based violence.

=== Internationally ===
There are organizations across the world seeking to address the problem of online gender-based violence. These include United Nations organizations such as the UNESCO and the Office of the United Nations High Commissioner for Human Rights.

The Swedish International Development Cooperation Agency (SIDA) is an agency of the Swedish government working to bring awareness to online gender-based violence in the hopes of increasing regulations. They have also published a report which found that over the last few years, online gender-based violence has garnered acknowledgment within the international community. The SIDA report serves as a source of information to further regulation process. It also noted the role of organizations such as the Women's Rights Programme of the Association of Progressive Communication in pushing for an increase in substantive policies regarding online gender-based violence. This report also points out the discrepancies between international regulations and state implementation.

Transnational feminist organizations have also emphasized that online gender-based violence transcends national borders, requiring coordinated global responses and data-sharing initiatives. The Association for Progressive Communications (APC) has been working since 2005 to end violence against women in the online space by strengthening women's rights organizations and activists working to end online gender-based violence. One of their projects in particular, "End violence: Women's rights and safety online" focuses on strengthening women's safety and security "by preventing the growing violence against women through ICTs." is being carried out in seven countries worldwide. Countries are: Bosnia Herzegovina, Colombia, Democratic Republic of Congo, Kenya, Mexico, Pakistan, and the Philippines. Some other APC projects include websites such as Take Back The Tech! and "GenderIT.org" which focus on providing tools for coping with receiving online gender-based violence and defend against online internet users who are spreading online gender-based violence.

== See also ==
- Character assassination
- Cyber defamation law
- Digital safety
- Digital media use and mental health
- Gamergate
- Mobbing
- Online shaming
