= Ungana-Afrika =

South African non-governmental organisation

- Founded: 2004
- Founder: Toni Eliasz; Rudi von Staden; Ryan Jacobs
- Type: Not-for-profit organization
- Headquarters: Pretoria, South Africa
- Region served: African Technology Service Providers and Civil Society Organisations
- Method: ICT program development, capacity-building, tools development and research
- Employees: 5
- Website: www.ungana-afrika.org

Ungana-Afrika, Swahili for "connect africa", is a non-governmental organisation based in Pretoria, South Africa that provides a wide range of ICT services for civil society within and outside of the continent. It aims to better empower civil society organisations, networks and related stakeholders, in terms of ICT capacity and resources, so they can efficiently achieve their unique social missions.

Ungana-Afrika's efforts include addressing the critical digital divide issues within African civil society (such as the lack of technology capacity and universal access). Through the implementation of new support programmes and tools, capacity-building and general research they aim to connect Africa through information technology. Though some services are targeted directly to civil society organisations (across sectors), many of Ungana-Afrika's efforts are focused towards the empowerment of information technology service providers and general Information and Communication Technology for Development (ICT4D) networks that jointly serve these organisations.

Ungana-Afrika's work has gathered several awards for community leadership.

== Services and programs ==
Ungana-Afrika's work are centered around 3 main service areas, where each targets a focused group of beneficiaries. All efforts, either in a direct or indirect manner, aim to "empower development organisations to better integrate ICTs as a strategic, mission focused, tool". These service areas are titled as follows:

- Centre of Excellence – This term refers to the central source of tools and resources that encourage excellency in technology support efforts. Ungana-Afrika provides program incubation, capacity building and resource development for technology service providers and networks that serve civil society. These beneficiaries may be nonprofit support providers, for-profit small to medium enterprises (SMEs) or related. Service outputs include the creation of public toolkits, resources, trainings and shared support models.
- Technology Consulting Partner – Ungana-Afrika delivers technology consultancy and research to the broad ICT4D community. These beneficiaries and partners may include Free and open-source software (FOSS) initiatives, nonprofit and for-profit groups exploring new technologies for developmental applications (such as mobile communications and wireless technologies) and other initiatives addressing barriers of the digital divide. Service outputs include concept research, testing, roll-out support and knowledge dissemination via presentations and trainings.
- Regional Support Hub – In addition to supporting the technology support community that serves civil society, Ungana-Afrika provides its own support services directly to non-profit and community service organisations in Southern Africa. These efforts often make use of mobile support models that are designed specifically for civil society beneficiaries, such as eRiding.

== Supporters, clients and affiliations ==
Ungana-Afrika's activities are funded through a combination of grants, project-specific funding and project revenue. Core supporters include the Open Society Institutes, Hivos and the Finnish government.

Notable clients include the Association for Progressive Communications (APC), CompuMentor, Sangonet, Women'sNet and EngenderHealth.

Ungana-Afrika also draws upon a number of partnerships within the ICT4D community. For example, Ungana-Afrika is an official member of the Association for Progressive Communications (APC).

== Origins and history ==
Ungana-Afrika has been active in Southern Africa since 2003. In an interview, co-founder Rudi von Staden (29) said the organisation "was formed as a partnership with the student organisation then called AIESEC (a French acronym, for an association of students interested in economics), and OSISA (the Open Society Initiative for Southern Africa)." He continued to say "There were then some seven AIESEC members around the world, and they all came together in Johannesburg in 2003, with the objective of improving the technology capacity in NGOs in Southern Africa. There's still three of us of the initial seven who are still there — Ryan Jacobs from the United States, Toni Eliasz of Finland and myself."

During its initial year as an AIESEC and OSISA project, Ungana-Afrika continued to evaluate and implement support models for Southern Africa's development community, including a relatively new mobile consulting and support method called eRiding. In 2004, acknowledging the need for a sustainable nonprofit technology support hub in Southern Africa, Ungana-Afrika formally registered as a non-profit organisation and moved to an office in Pretoria, South Africa.

In recent years, Ungana-Afrika has increased its focus on capacity building and toolkit development for ICT support providers and the ICT support community. However, it still continues to deliver support and training directly to nonprofit and community service organisations in Southern Africa.

To date, Ungana-Afrika has received a number of national and international awards including an APC member award for "best initiative promoting the strategic use of ICTs for social change" and a Dirk Award for "extraordinary contributions to the nonprofit and international NGO technology communities".

== See also ==
- Nonprofit technology
- Circuit rider (Technology)
