= Korean Digital Justice Network =

The Digital Justice Network (DJN) (Korean: 디지털정의네트워크), formerly known as the Korean Progressive Network Center (Korean: 진보네트워크센터) or Jinbonet (Korean: 진보넷), is a non-profit ISP and advocacy organization based in South Korea. It was launched in 1998, and it joined the Association for Progressive Communications in 2001. DJN provides ICT services including web hosting, mailing lists, and webmail to South Korea's progressive movements, civil society, and workers' unions. DJN advocates for digital rights in the face of corporate and government threats to freedom of speech, artistic freedom, privacy, and access to information.

== Founding ==
The DJN was created in the aftermath of the 1997 Seoul International Labor Media conference, a three-day, broadcast event held at Yonsei University. During the conference, activists from around the world discussed labor movements in the context of a globalized, networked, and digital era. These activists included members of JCA-NET and the United States and United Kingdom chapters of LaborNet. 'Jinbonet', the first incarnation of the DJN, was not officially launched until the following year.

The DJN initially sought to provide independent network services for progressive communication. Oh Byoung-il, a founding member of the DJN and its current president, argued that an independent network was necessary because "any network of state and capital can easily be transformed into a network of censorship and oppression."

== Evolving mission and name change ==
Since its initial founding, the DJN has expanded its mission from technology to advocacy. It has challenged the corporate use of resident registration numbers, as well as legislation seeking to erode informed consent, net neutrality, privacy, and other digital rights. It engaged in a five-year campaign against South Korea's Real-Name System, which it considered to be an unconstitutional violation of freedom of expression. This included a 2011 written statement to the United Nations Human Rights Council.

In October, 2025, the DJN changed its name from the Progressive Network Center to the Digital Justice Network in order to "better reflect [its] transformed identity."

== Structure ==
The DJN has a twelve-member board which includes lawyers, politicians, developers, and journalists. It also has one auditor, a president (Oh Byoung-il), and five listed staff. The DJN is supported by paying members, who are entitled to its ICT services and inclusion in yearly general meetings.

The DJN has collaborated with various external civil society groups in its capacity as an advocacy organization.

== Services ==
The DJN has reported that, as of 2010, they provided ICT services for 500 organizations. Their services run on free and open-source software.
