= Econnect =

Econnect is a Czech non-profit organisation. It works to "help other non-profit organisations from the Czech Republic to use electronic communication systems and to have easy access to information technology." Founded in 1991, it came about because of the need for communication between diverse ecological action groups that were networked around the Green Circle umbrella organisation.

According to the group itself, its name "Econnect" comes from an abbreviation of "easy connection", which reflects its goal of providing smooth communications between action groups.

Econnect's goal has been to cover all parts of the Czech Republic and Slovakia. It created a network of 10 organisations, based in the big towns. These networking organisations were seen to be among the prominent players of the ecological movement at the time.

Internet and e-mail access was provided to Econnect since 1991, when the Internet was yet to be accepted as a major tool of communication in the country.

Econnect is a source of information from the non-profit sector. In 1991, Econnect became part of the alternate internet service providers, the Association for Progressive Communications.

Its current services include connections to the Internet, building a web presence for the non-profit world, technical support, conference services, training, and drawing more visitors via the Internet to alternative groups.
