= BlueLink =

BlueLink may refer to:

- BlueLink (software), suite of campaign management mobile apps designed to register, organize, and mobilize liberal voters
- BlueLink Information Network, a virtual network of Bulgarian non-governmental organizations and activists
