= Hochemin Islam =

Bangladeshi human rights activist

- হোচিমিন ইসলাম
- Born: Bogra, Rajshahi Division, Bangladesh
- Education: University of Rajshahi
- Occupations: Nurse; Human rights activist
- Organization: Krishnachura
- Known for: Advocacy for transgender people in Bangladesh

Hochemin Islam (Bengali: হোচিমিন ইসলাম), also spelled Ho Chi Minh Islam, is a Bangladeshi human rights activist and nurse. She is known for her advocacy for transgender people in Bangladesh, particularly those living in rural areas.

== Early life and education ==
Islam was born and raised in Bogra, a city in Rajshahi Division. She was named after Ho Chi Minh, a Vietnamese revolutionary, by her father, who stated he was inspired by Ho's "rebellious spirit".

Islam studied nursing at Thengamara Mohila Sabuj Sangha Medical College in Bogra, as well as at the University of Rajshahi. As of 2022, she was studying for a master's degree in public health at BRAC University in Dhaka.

== Nursing career ==
After graduating, Islam briefly worked at Chhagalnaiya Upazila Health Complex in Feni, Chittagong Division, before moving to Dhaka, where she became the first openly transgender woman to work at Square Hospital. During her time there, Islam helped treat the first person in Bangladesh diagnosed with coronavirus, later contracting the disease herself.

As of 2024, Islam works at the National Institute of Neurosciences Hospital in Dhaka.

== Activism ==
In 2014, Islam joined VOICE Bangladesh, a rights-based research and advocacy organisation, during which time she came to identify as a transgender woman. She went on to establish her own community-based organisation, Krishnachura, which aimed to provide safe spaces for discussion and exploration of gender and gender minorities in rural areas of Bangladesh. Islam has also worked as a development officer and goodwill ambassador for transgender rights at No Passport Voice, and as the Bangladesh lead for the South Asian Youth and Queer Activists Network.

Islam has stated her belief that there is a distinction between being transgender and being a hijra, describing hijra as a "culture" and not a gender, and called for transgender, or a third gender, to be legally recognised on official documents, alongside or in addition to hijras. Islam supported calls by other transgender activists for the Bangladeshi parliament to have two reserved seats for transgender women, separate to seats for cisgender women or hijras.

In November 2023, Islam was prevented from speaking at a women's career carnival at North South University about inclusivity, after security concerns were raised after a group of students threatened to boycott exams and cause unrest if she was in included in the line-up. Some students participated in rallies in which signs reading "no transgender" were erected, stating her appearance was illegal under chapter 6, article 377 of the Bangladeshi penal code. The human rights organisation Justice Makers Bangladesh in France subsequently protested the cancellation of Islam's appearance. The Chhatra Union accused North South University of violating its charter to provide an inclusive educational environment by barring Islam from speaking.

In October 2026, Islam was scheduled to speak at the Bay of Bengal Conversation 2026 organised by the Centre of Governance Studies. Following a wave of backlash against Islam's participation, led by National Citizen Party leader Sarjis Alam, who publicly called her a threat to "family, religion, society and the state", Islam was subsequently dropped from the programme.

== Recognition ==
Islam was a fellow of the Acumen Academy in 2022 in recognition of her work for social change in Bangladesh.
