= Markus N. Beeko =

German activist

Markus N. Beeko (born 1967 in Cologne) is a German human rights activist and Secretary General of the German section of Amnesty International.

== Education ==
Having studied marketing, organization and traffic safety at University of Cologne from 1988 to 1994, Beeko completed his education with a Master degree in Business Administration; he then worked for the advertising agency LINTAS for five years and from 2000 to 2004, at Prognos AG, an economic research and consulting company in Europe, where he was in charge of corporate communications.

== Career ==
From 2004, Beeko headed the campaign and communications department of the German section of Amnesty International, and was also a member of Institute for Global Communications at Amnesty International's secretariat in London.

On September 1, 2016, Beeko took the office of the German section of Amnesty International, succeeding Selmin Çalışkan.
