= Foundation for Media Alternatives =

Filipino foundation

- Abbreviation: FMA
- Formation: May 1987
- Type: Non-profit organization
- Headquarters: Quezon City
- Location: Quezon City, Philippines
- Official language: English
- Executive Director: Liza Garcia
- Website: fma.ph

The Foundation for Media Alternatives (FMA) is as a non-stock, non-government organization formed in 1987. It assists citizens and communities – especially civil society organizations (CSOs) and other disadvantaged sectors – in the strategic and appropriate use of information and communications technologies (ICTs) for democratization and popular empowerment. Since its founding, FMA has "sought to enhance the popularization and social marketing of development-oriented issues and campaigns through media-related interventions, social communication projects, and cultural work."' It is a member of the Association for Progressive Communications (APC).

FMA has worked in producing the public affairs television show ("Street Pulse", between 1986–1989), development-oriented video-documentaries (such as Gawad CCP 1991, "Dear Sam, …Sumasainyo, Juan", some of which were award-winning). It has also been involved in song-writing festivals (for instance, the 1992 Katipunan Centennial). Apart from this the FMA has been part of advocacy campaigns, and various publications to support different civil society organisations.

After the Internet took root and grew in the Philippines, FMA and others working in parallel fields increasingly felt that information and communication technologies (ICT) would be "the New Media or tool that will enable fellow civil society organizations to improve their respective processes, information sharing, collaboration, and in the long run allow them to achieve their respective visions."

From 1997, FMA streamlined its services and programmes — in both the traditional and New Media — and undertook "strategic interventions" in campaigns for the right to information and right to communicate. FMA says it has also "focused on democratizing Information and Communications Technologies (ICTs), aimed at empowering Philippine civil society through the critical use of appropriate new (i.e, computer-based) media." In 2011, its activities include developing a framework and pilot testing an "Open E-Governance Index", supporting the 'MDG3: Take Back the Tech! To End Violence Against Women' project being undertaken globally by the APC and working with Privacy International to analyse digital privacy issues in the Philippines

Some of its mission goals include assisting civil society organisations (specially "people's organisations and non-governmental organisations, and social movements) in "asserting the people's right to information and the right to communicate through the democratization of appropriate media resources and services to the greatest number".

== See also ==
- Computer Professionals' Union
