= Women'sNet =

Women'sNet is a networking support programme designed to enable South African women to address gender imbalances around ICT access.

== Issues ==
Some of the issues it has focused on include HIV/AIDS, violence against women, Gender in Parliament, Health, Women and Information and communication technologies (ICTs), Women and Enterprise, and Women and Elections.

== Resources ==
The Women'sNet site offers links to useful websites, a newsletter (launched in April 2006), links to relevant issues, and a directory of organisations. Their website serves as a hub for information created by women, for women.

== History ==
In 1998, Women'sNet was established as a project of the Commission of Gender Equality and SANGONeT. In the following year, the first Women'sNet webpages went live, focusing on women and human rights issues in South Africa.

It also created the first online space for South African women to reflect and strategise in the lead up to the 1999 national elections. In 1999 too, the African Sisters online workshop was held. Women'sNet collaborated with FEMNET to create an online platform for joining regional processes in the lead-up to the Beijing+5 conference.

2001 saw the creation of the first women-run internet cafe for civil society organisations at the World Conference Against Racism, Xenophobia and related Intolerances, among other activities.

In 2000, Women'sNet launched a project to combine radio and audio production with women's NGOs efforts, to promote a women's empowerment agenda. It also won the Highway Africa ward for Innovative Use of the New Media.

Other landmarks include SANGONeT Board's confirming Women'sNet's independent status (April 2002), its joining of the international ICT4D network the Association for Progressive Communications, being officially registered as a non-governmental organisation (January 2003), being a core partner in the first Africa-wide Women and Electronic Networking Training in Cape Town (2003), launching an on-line up-datable database of South African organisations providing services targeted at girls (March 2003).

In 2004, it convened a stake-holders meet to consult South African women's NGOs on their information and technology needs; launched the GenderStats website, launching Girls'Net, hosting the first African workshop on free software (or FLOSS) and implementing the Recording Women's Voices project.

== Training, technology planning ==
In 2005 and 2006, Women'sNet has also co-trained South African women to participate in the global cyber-dialogues on the Beijing+10 review process, and women's NGOs on technology planning and FLOSS. Girl'sNet runs a visual literacy training project with young girls in the Eastern Cape, and has held a photo exhibition in August 2005. Women'sNet also launched the (s)hebytes project and website as a space "where women and men talk about gender and women's empowerment". It launched digital story telling workshops "to train women and girls in story telling -- combining images, audio and text into a short documentary about their lives".
