= Wamani =

ICT nonprofit organization

Wamani is a non-governmental organisation working on ICT issues in Argentina. In 2004, Wamani built a regional information system for the Latin American chapters of Amnesty International.

Human rights organisations in that part of the world (Latin America), such as Madres de la Plaza de Mayo have been using the service platform offered by Wamani, which is targeted towards non-profit organisations.

Wamani has also help boost the online communication systems of six different sites, related to Amnesty sections in as many different countries. It has also been work on themes relating to intranets, virtual campuses and real strategic alliances.

Wamani has also been involved in implementing an intranet and a campus for the whole of human rights watchdog Amnesty International in the Latin American and Caribbean region. It has built links with researchers and experts in distance education, and organisational development, management and the development of human resources, according to the 2005 annual report of the Association for Progressive Communications, of which Wamani is a member: "Throughout 2005, Wamani's technical team work on the development, implementation and experimentation of a group of tools to support training and distance education processes, as well as support systems (intranets) for the internal and external operations of organisations or networks".
