= BlueLink Information Network =

BlueLink Information Network/BlueLink Civic Action Network was a virtual network of Bulgarian non-governmental organizations (NGOs) and activists, based in Sofia, Bulgaria. The network offered a variety of Internet-based content and tools for environment, human rights and democracy defenders, organisations, groups and organisations. Established in 1999, it was maintained by the BlueLink Foundation in Bulgaria, which implemented a broad variety of projects in pursuit of its public interest mission.

== BlueLink's mission ==
BlueLink is a foundation, registered in public interest in Bulgaria with the mission to uphold civil society, democracy, shared European values and environmental sustainability. BlueLink strives to its purpose by supporting internet networking, public interest journalism, policy advocacy and research.

== The founding of BlueLink ==
According to the Regional Environmental Press Centre for South Eastern Europe, BlueLink started in 1998 as a joint project of environmental NGOs from different cities in Bulgaria. These included ECO-CLUB 2000, Centre for Environmental Information and Education of Sofia, the environmental club Terra of Blagoevgrad, Green Balkans of Sofia, the geo eco-club Academica of Veliko Tarnovo, Za Zemiata, the Bulgarian Biodiversity Preservation Society of Semperviva - Pernik and the Public Environmental Centre for Sustainable Development in Varna. The bond and mutual trust among these organisations in each other's integrity defined BlueLink's organisational philosophy as trust-based networking.

== Early history of BlueLink ==
BlueLink was established as a communication and exchange platform by a group of active environmental NGOs in Bulgaria in 1997–1998. BlueLink Information Network was founded in 1997 by social and environmental activists with the aim of improving the capabilities of the Bulgarian NGO sector through the use of Information and Communication Technologies. The BlueLink Pilot Project was started by ECO-CLUB 2000, a Bulgarian Environmental NGO, with funding from Milieukontakt Oost-Europa, a Dutch NGO which supported environmental sustainability in the countries of Europe and Asia. In April 1999, Bulgarian environmental NGOs recognised BlueLink's as a coordinating hub in the sector for electronic communications. This role was integrated into the “Final Declaration” of the National NGO Meeting. Milieu Kontakt Oost Europa says "Some of the NGO-networks (Ekomrezabih Bosnia and Herzegovina, StrawberryNet Romania and BlueLink Bulgaria) are rather active and disseminate environmental information, including information on the Aarhus Convention. Since its early years BlueLink developed various Information and Communication Technology projects for civil society in Bulgaria and in neighbouring countries of Central and Eastern Europe, the Balkans and New Independent States. BlueLink also organized training workshops for NGOs on the use of ICTs, work with mass media and other subjects. BlueLink also promoted national, regional and international NGO cooperation by organizing or hosting conferences such as annual Meetings of Environmental NGOs in Bulgaria.

== Membership in APC.org ==
In 1999 BlueLink became an associated member of the Association for Progressive Communications, an international network of organizations using the Internet and Information and Communication Technologies for social justice and development. BlueLink was accepted as a regular member of in 2000.

In 2005 BlueLink co-initiated APC's IT for environmental sustainability initiative, also known as Greening IT. According to APC, BlueLink hosted the Council of APC members in Varna, Bulgaria. BlueLink handled the logistics for the 10-day summit, and organized a debate titled "Open Access for All" on 7 October 2005. About 50 representatives from the APC member organizations from 32 countries were present along with guest technology experts and environmental activists participating online from Bulgaria and the Balkan region.

== BlueLink and the Aarhus Convention ==
Since 1998 BlueLink actively promotes the Aarhus Convention, informs NGOs about it, and facilitates their participation in its activities . BlueLink's work has been recognized by the UN Aarhaus Clearinghouse for Environmental Democracy, the Stockholm Challenge awards and by the international network, APC.

In February 2005, the APCNews reported that BlueLink had "developed and published a Bulgarian language manual on the strategic use of the internet for civil society organisations (CSOs)." According to this report, the manual teaches CSOs "how to work effectively in electronic network, and how to improve and optimize significantly their work using ICTs." Its stated aim was to fill in the "gaps in the knowledge" of the CSOs on the opportunities that the electronic communication offers via internet, and to explore the options of their effective use in organizations' work.

APCNews also said that the guide includes tips on how to communicate in mailing lists, how to build a useful and representative website, on-line activism, and more. This manual is available only in Bulgarian and is used as a basic training material in BlueLink's trainings. It is based on the group's experience while educating NGO members how to improve their work and efficiency via the internet. It was written almost three years ago (as of 2007) and currently it has undergone some upgrades.

== Support for civic networking ==
In 2009 - 2010 BlueLink supported the Bulgarian Anti-Nuclear Coalition of NGOs

In July 2009 BlueLink launched an online platform where citizens could file alerts of illegal logging in Bulgaria's forests, and announced trainings for volunteers, willing to use the system, Actualno.com reported .

== Support for defenders of human, gender and social rights ==
While originating from the environmental movement, BlueLink has extended support to other civil society sectors, including human, gender, social and refugee rights defenders. Following Bulgaria's sudden rejection of the Istanbul Convention in 2018, BlueLink analyzed gender-based violence online with support and funding from the APC's Feminist Internet Research Network and supported partnership among civic and state actors.

== Support for watchdog journalism ==
BlueLink's original vision centered around using the Internet to enable free exchange of information, thus compensating for the flaws and biases of mainstream mass media. The organization therefore offered training and capacity building to journalists in Bulgaria and other countries. Since 2010 this changed, in response to lowering journalistic standards and media independence in Bulgaria and other countries of the region. In 2013 BlueLink launched as its Bulgarian language e-magazine for journalism in public interest. This was soon followed by an international edition for Central and Eastern Europe, entitled BlueLink Stories at .

== Management and organization ==
BlueLink was initiated in 1997 - 1998 as an informal information network by representatives of 10 Bulgarian environmental NGOs and concerned citizens, referred to as "BlueLink's Founders”. BlueLink's Founders were led by ECO-CLUB2000, Sofia; and included also the Centre for Environmental Information and Education, Sofia; Environmental Youth Club Terra, Blagoevgrad; Academica GeoEcoClub, Veliko Tarnovo; Balkani Wildlife Society, Sofia; Environmental association Za Zemiata (For the Earth), Sofia; Bulgarian Biodiversity Preservation Society Semperviva, Pernik; and the Public Centre for the Environment and Sustainable Development, Varna . BlueLink was formally registered as a foundation in Bulgaria in 1999, under the Persons and Families Act. At this stage the network's co-ordinators Pavel Antonov and Vassil Beyazov joined as formal co-founders, together with the former representative to Bulgaria of Milieukontakt Oost-Europa Willem Tjebbe Oostenbrink. The PCESD, Varna, did not join formally, but has been recognized as an informal co-founder.

Since its formal registration in 1999 the BlueLink Foundation has been governed by the Council of the Founders – its supreme body. It consists of formally appointed representatives of the eight co-founding NGOs; as well as the three individual co-founders.

The Council of the Founders elects an executive board (EB) which runs the organisation. Since 2001 the EB has been appointing an executive officer to manage the organisation's team. Currently (2022) BlueLink is managed by Pavel Antonov, PhD, who has been BlueLink's first co-ordinator and an individual co-founder and EB member since BlueLink was founded. Other previous BlueLink chief executives have included Nina Blagoeva, Milena Bokova, Evgenia Tasheva, Vera Staevska and Dimitur Vassileb (interim).

BlueLink Executive Board currently (2022) consists of Milena Dimitrova (chair), representing the Centre for Environmental Information and Education in Sofia; Natalia Dimitrova of Environmental Club Terra - Blagoevgrad; individual founders Pavel Antonov and Willem Tjebe Oostenbrink.
