= Fantsuam Foundation =

Nigerian non-profit organisation

Fantsuam Foundation is a Nigerian non-profit organisation working in the field of Information and Communication Technologies (ICT) that is working to develop a rugged computer suited for African conditions. Known as the Solo computer, this wooden-encased PC is being designed to cope with the "heat and dust" of Africa.

== Wireless internet in northern Nigeria ==
It is the lone provider of wireless internet service in northern Nigeria. Founded in 1996 in Jos, Nigeria, Fantsuam Foundation is a non-profit organization working on gender and youth focused microfinance and ICT (or information and communication technology) services and development in rural communities of Nigeria.

== BBC's interest ==
British telecasters from the BBC were surprised by the "digital renaissance" experienced by the affected area in Kafanchan.

== Solo computer's plans ==
Now Fantsuam Foundation is working on a revolutionary solar-powered alternative computer, tailormade for the "developing world".

John Dada of Fantsuam told the Association for Progressive Communications in an interview, "FF had been involved in importation of refurbished PCs for civil society organizations in Nigeria. We soon realized that these PCs were as vulnerable to heat, dust and unreliable power supply as the brand new ones. We found a UK-based design team that was working on a system that addressed these three 'rural tropical' issues."

Fantsuam plans to develop this into a small industry that can serve the local population.

"It is our way of bringing cutting edge technology to rural Nigeria, and promoting rural ICT entrepreneurship and associated downstream employment opportunities," says Dada.

== Starting with micro-finance ==
He also noted that the BBC coverage significantly helped highlight their program. Drawing global attention, this film reported how the Fantsuam Foundation, started as a micro-finance project with only twenty-five clients, turned out to be a huge success and administration became a problem. They report great success in regards to classroom work and training with new users.

== High temperatures, dust and PCs ==
The new computer is called Solo and they are developing it in partnership with a group of software designers based in Britain. The Foundation reports that high temperatures and dust are a large factor in causing a high number of crashes, especially when combined with unstable software. The Solo computer is designed to get around these troubles and Fantsuam is now field-testing the latest prototype, which is approximately the size of a single card from the motherboard of a normal PC.

The Solo has no moving parts to fail as the hard drive is replaced by a flash card and is specially engineered to work under 8.5 watts of power. It runs on the Linux computer operating system, which greatly reduces the cost that would otherwise be necessary for the purchase of an operating system.

== Cheaper in the long-run ==
The Fantsuam Foundation plans to produce Solo computers for the general market.

They are giving workshops and demonstrations to potential users of the new system. The system currently prices at around $1200. But John Dada argues that might not be a high price for a machine that lasts for 12 to 15 years. In the long run the costs will even out because there will be no expensive maintenance bills or software upgrades, he says. But coming up with the initial investment is not easy.

Says Dada: "In five, ten years time my hope is that each village in Nigeria -- I'm not asking for too much -- each village in Nigeria can have one Solo. If one village has one Solo the whole of Nigeria will be networked. To me that would be moving into the 20th century for Nigeria."
