= Web Networks =

Web Networks is a non-profit organisation based in Toronto, Canada that provides website services to socially committed organizations. It was conceived at a 1986 "Friends of the Earth" conference in Ottawa, Ontario and founded by Mike Jensen and Kirk Roberts and others in 1987 as a project of NIRV Centre and called "The Web".

Web Networks was a founding member of the Association for Progressive Communications.

Among its "full range of internet tools and services" are website hosting, and Drupal website development services.

In 2005 it began development of a web-based literacy application called "Yodigo"

In September 2006, Web Networks released its Drupal usability report.

It worked with the Piruvik Centre of Iqaluit to provide Inuit with Inuktitut-friendly website content management services called "Attavik".

== See also ==
- Communications in Canada
- Science and technology in Canada
- United Nations Information and Communication Technologies Task Force
