= ArabDev =

ArabDev is a Giza (Egypt)-based non-profit organization that uses Information and Communication Technology (ICT) to "promote existing development projects and for innovative developmental initiatives". ArabDev provides women and youth with an educational venue for livelihood opportunities, through improved access to information and its use in skill development as well as small and micro enterprises.

== Formation ==
It was formed by its non-governmental organizations (NGOs) both in Egypt and in the wider Arab region. ArabDev seeks to support ICT capacity-building among disadvantaged communities and grassroots organizations to get access to better work and life opportunities.

== Focus ==
Its focus includes, using ICTs for:

- Poverty reduction.
- Skill development.
- Dissemination of developmental information.
- Creation of linkages between NGOs.
- Supporting developmental advocacy.

== Current initiatives ==
ArabDev, which is a member of the Association for Progressive Communications, has reported recent initiatives to spread free software among youth in the disadvantaged south of Egypt. The group reported working with two middle schools in the Al Menia governorate, and also with the Faculty of Computer Engineering of the Menia University.

For this project, the goal is to establish a "core group" of FLOSS users in the Minya Governorate, which could act as a south Egyptian "diffusion point".

So far, it has created computer labs or telecentres in some schools, which also offer their services to the community. In the Association for Progressive Communications report for 2005-06, it was stated that ArabDev reached an agreement with the Egyptian education department to collect fees, so as to make this venture sustainable.
