= Gender evaluation methodology =

The Gender Evaluation Methodology (GEM) is an evaluation methodology that integrates a gender analysis into evaluations of initiatives that use information and communications technologies (ICTs) for social change. It is an evaluation tool for determining whether ICTs are really improving or worsening women's lives and gender relations, as well as for promoting positive change at the individual, institutional, community and broader social levels.

== Development ==
GEM was first developed in 2002 and was tried and tested by thirty community-based organizations. Since then, hundreds of people have become involved in GEM's development including: people who developed the tool, who train in how to use GEM, who are adapting GEM (to increase its applicability to rural ICT4D projects, telecentres, software localisation and ICT policy advocacy and who are now offering GEM evaluations on a consultancy basis.

== Manual ==
The GEM manual was written in English and has been translated into French, Spanish, Brazilian, Portuguese and Arabic.

== Developers ==
GEM was developed by the Women's Networking Support Programme of the Association for Progressive Communications (APC WNSP).

== Telecentres ==
In rural Uganda, telecentres were established to promote rural access to information and foster development; however they are not getting the results they had hoped for. An evaluation of telecentres by the Acacia programme in South Africa revealed that women consistently make up less than one-third of telecentre users, even when female staff and materials that target women are made available.

Seeking to understand why this is so, UgaBYTES, a Uganda-based NGO that works to promote access to ICTs in rural East Africa, conducted a study between August 2008 and March 2009 in two rural telecentres – the Buwama Community Multimedia Centre and the Kawolo telecentre – using and adapting GEM. The goal of the evaluation was to better understand whether or not the telecentre services were meeting the different needs of women and men.

UgaBYTES found that, because technologies are socially constructed, they have different impacts on women versus men. Beyond the common obstacles to access like: technical infrastructure, connection costs and computer literacy, women face numerous additional barriers to accessing ICTs.

== Policy impact ==
In November 2009, the Dominican Republic became the first Latin American country to pledge to include a "gender perspective" in every information and communications technology (ICT) initiative and policy developed by the government. This is significant regionally as the Dominican Republic is leading the thinking of Latin American governments regarding gender and technology as part of the regional eLAC2010 plan. The Dominicans chose the Gender Evaluation Methodology (GEM) as the tool to design and evaluate all public policies.

The gender evaluation methodology has been used in Chhattisgarh state in India to evaluate why women, rural heads of village, are not participating actively in local government despite the fact that they are numerous in number (30% of all local government seats being reserved for women) and that they can, in theory, remotely communicate the needs of their villages through the use of a Simputer – a low-cost computer that does not require computer literacy. The GEM study revealed that numerous technical problems related to the Simputers and ingrained inequalities, mean that even designated female representatives remain voiceless. An evaluation that does not focus on gender-related inequalities may not have uncovered these reasons.
