= Association for Progressive Communications =

The Association for Progressive Communications (APC) is an international network of organizations that was founded in 1990 to provide communication infrastructure, including Internet-based applications, to groups and individuals who work for peace, human rights, protection of the environment, and sustainability. Pioneering the use of ICTs for civil society, especially in developing countries, APC were often the first providers of Internet in their member countries.

APC is a worldwide network of social activists who aim to use the internet to make the world a better place. APC is both a network and an organisation. APC members are groups working in their own countries to advance the same mission as APC. APC has more than 59 members, mostly in Asia, Africa and Latina America, from five continents.

== History ==
=== Background and creation ===
APC was founded in 1990 by:

- Institute for Global Communications (IGC), San Francisco, USA
- GreenNet, London, United Kingdom
- IBASE, Rio de Janeiro, Brazil
- Nicarao, Managua, Nicaragua
- Pegasus Networks, Byron Bay, Australia
- Web Networks, Toronto, Canada
- NordNet, Sweden

The activists working with United Nations–sponsored data management NGO (IDOC) create a network of like-minded organisations working with information and alternative media. At this point they communicated mainly using fax and regular mail. People physically travelled around transporting and sharing databases of information and software on disks.

In 1988, on the verge of APC creation, Mitra Ardron describes the central characteristic of the future APC user, present operations and the history of APC precedents: PeaceNet, EcoNet and GreenNet. He also expresses a common commitment to global communication available to everyone.

=== UN status ===
Collaboration between APC and the United Nations began in 1992, in preparation for the UN Conference on Environment and Development (UNCED), more popularly known as the Earth Summit. As APC had the only international, civil society communications network in existence at that time, the UNCED secretariat published their information in APC conferences. They had no other way of distributing information so economically and so effectively. (The UN itself began distributing information by electronic means many years later). Email links are set up between Cuba and APC networks. They call the Cuban servers three times a day to deliver and collect email.

The cooperation continues over the years. APC received consultative status to the UN with the several quadrennial reports submitted over the years. APC also cooperated with United Nations Development Programme. APC actively participate in UN initiatives such as Millennium Development Goals. The studies of violence against women and ICTs in ten countries and how legislation or lack of it hinders or helps women were conducted and published as a part of promoting gender equality and empowering women.

The APC Women's Networking Support Programme (APC - WNSP) co-coordinated a women's network to bring an NGO perspective to the UN Beijing +5 review. Official declarations promote ICT as a way of enhancing NGO participation in global media policy making. It also gives recommendations for women's portrayal, decision making and advocacy in media industry.

=== Late 1990s ===
APC made a significant impact in Africa, Asia, Central and Eastern Europe, and the Caribbean by providing civil society organisations with email and e-information using the Fidonet gateways. Fidonet protocol was used because it is store-and-forward technology enabling people to compose and read email offline which is very important in the countries with the pour infrastructure (phone lines, electrical supply and hardware).

APC's African networks faced with the strong competition from commercial providers, held an Africa Strategy Development Meeting from February 8–11, 1997 in Johannesburg, South Africa. The meeting attended 34 APC members and partner networks from all over Africa. The program areas, action framework and plan as well as women's program were discussed. A powerful statement from the meeting was published as The Holy Family Communiqué from African Electronic Communicators.

A legal threat to freedom of information online came from the company Biwater and involved APC member LabourNet, April 1997. Thirteen APC members mirrored the threatened content.

=== 2000–2003 ===
2000 was a turning point for APC. The new vision statement drafted at an APC council meeting held in Piriapolis, Uruguay hosted by the Third World Institute (ITeM): "APC works to achieve a world in which all people have easy, equal and affordable access to the creative potential of the internet to improve their lives and create more democratic and egalitarian societies.".

In May 2001, APC and partners started work on building a portal which collects training materials related to ICT for social change. This portal, named Itrain Online, is an entry point for finding the best computer training resources on the web for the social change and development.

The first APC Internet Rights Charter was published in three languages: English, French and Spanish. The themes: internet access for all, freedom of expression and association, access to knowledge, shared learning and creation, privacy, governance and rights were addressed.

APC started Gender, Agriculture and Rural Development in the Information Society (GenARDIS) in 2002. This project was launched to provide small grants for the agricultural initiatives by women. The access to new information and communication technologies affected rural men and women and improved agricultural production.

The ICT policy handbook for beginners was published in 2003 together with a tri-lingual ICT policy training for civil society curriculum which includes a special section on advocacy for positive policy change.

APC stimulated multi-stakeholder dialogue as part of the Catalysing Access to ICTs in Africa (CATIA) programme, and trained 100 technology enthusiasts in Africa to set up community wireless networks.

=== 2004–2008 ===
Take Back The Tech!, a 16 days of activism against gender-based violence (25 Nov - 10 Dec), started in 2006. This campaign engages information and communication technology in helping end gender-based violence.

APC joined Internet Governance Forum for the first time in 2008. A statement to IGF open consultations was submitted before the third IGF supporting regional IGF meetings and giving suggestions about themes and content of the meeting in Hyderabad.

The first edition of Global Information Society Watch was published, focused on citizen participation in ICT policy processes in the wake of the World Summit on the Information Society. These reports are accessible yearly and are a joint initiative with the Humanist Institute for Development Cooperation Hivos.

The other activities included replication of the community wireless training developed in Africa in Latin America and the Caribbean, forming an eighteen-country network connecting indigenous communities, rural backwaters and impulsing university networking courses, the first Feminist Tech Exchange, training people from 680 organisations in technology for social change and ICT policy from 2004-2008, organizing a press conference in Tunisia to address the host government's suppression of free speech in the wake of the second World Summit on the Information Society, launching GenderIT.org.

=== 2009–2012 strategic plan and progress ===
APC priorities for 2009–2012 period were: advocate for affordable internet for all, make technology work to sustain environment, use emerging technology for social change, build collaborative open online space, secure and defend internet rights and improve internet and other governance.

The strategic plan was realized by

- launching Internet Rights and Human Rights project,
- starting research on the real lived experiences of women around the internet and sexuality,
- publishing Global Information Society Watch: 2010 addressed the pressing issues of ICTs and climate change and e-waste, a dedicated edition on a defence of human rights and women's rights workers working online, GISWatch 2012 focused on the Internet and corruption, as well as 2 updates to GISWatch 2011: Update 1 and Update II,
- designing a manual called "Communicating research for influence: Strategies and challenges for bringing about change" based on their success stories and challenges in communicating research for influence,
- developing a practical guide to sustainable IT. It offers a detailed, "hands-on" introduction to thinking about sustainable computing holistically; starting with the choices you make when buying technology, through to the software and peripherals you use, how you store and work with information, manage your security, save power, and maintain and dispose of your old hardware.

The Dominican government chooses APC's Gender Evaluation Methodology (GEM) as a tool to design and evaluate their ICT policies.

The eleventh face-to-face APC council meeting is held on Panglao Island in the Philippines, hosted by the Foundation for Media Alternatives. Over one hundred communications activists also attend a Networking and Learning Forum to strategise for an open, fair and sustainable internet.

=== 2013–2016 strategic plan and progress ===
The second strategic plan was released defining five priorities for 2013–2016: securing and defending internet access and rights, fostering good internet governance, strengthening use and development of transformative technology, ending technology-based violence against women and girls and strengthening APC community networks.

The realization of this plan included the following:

- Global Information Society Watch was published on communication rights ten years after the World Summit on the Information Society (WSIS).
- APC co-organised the second (2014) and third (2015) editions of the African School on Internet Governance, with graduates from more than 15 African countries.

== Structure ==
APC is governed by the board of directors which include an executive director, a chair, a vice-chair, a treasurer and any other officers elected by APC council. The executive officer is a past board member and all other officers are elected for a three-year term during APC council meeting. The council is made up of the two representatives from each member organization and it is a secondary governing body that meets every three years. Besides, electing the board officers, it also sets strategic priorities.

APC board 2014–2016 was elected in Barcelona:

- Julián Casabuenas, Colnodo, Colombia (Chair)
- Valentina Pelizzer, OWPSEE, Bosnia-Herzegovina (Vice-chair)
- Liz Probert, GreenNet, United Kingdom (Secretary)
- Osama Manzar, Digital Empowerment Foundation, India (Treasurer)
- John Dada, Fantsuam Foundation, Nigeria
- Lillian Nalwoga, CIPESA, Uganda
- Chim Manavy, Open Institute, Cambodia
- Anriette Esterhuysen, APC, South Africa

== Membership ==
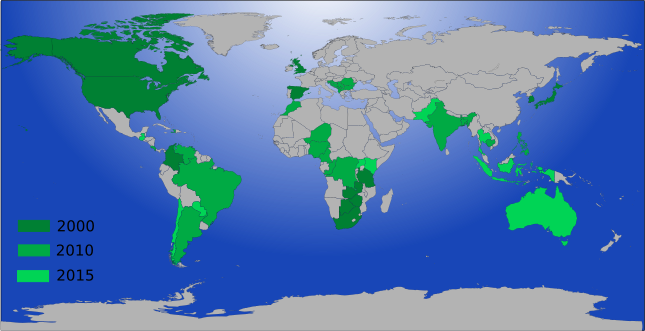
Association for Progressive Communications members

=== North America ===
- Alternatives, Action and Communication Network for International Development, Canada
- Institute for Global Communications (IGC), United States of America
- LaborNet, United States of America
- LaNeta, Mexico
- Web Networks, Canada
- May First/People Link, United States of America

=== Latin America and the Caribbean ===
- CEPES, Peru
- Colnodo, Colombia
- Fundación Escuela Latinoamericana de Redes (EsLaRed), Venezuela
- Instituto del Tercer Mundo (ITeM), Uruguay
- NODO TAU, Argentina
- RITS (Information Network for the Third Sector), Brazil
- Networks & Development Foundation - FUNREDES, Dominican Republic
- Wamani, Argentina
- Núcleo de Pesquisas, Estudos e Formação (Nupef), Brazil
- ONG Derechos Digitales, Chile
- Sulá Batsú, Costa Rica
- Asociación Trinidad Comunicación, Cultura y Desarrollo, Paraguay

=== Europe ===
- BlueLink Information Network, Bulgaria
- Computer Aid International, United Kingdom
- GreenNet, United Kingdom
- Green Spider, Hungary
- Metamorphosis Foundation, Macedonia
- OWPSEE, Bosnia-Herzegovina
- Pangea.org, Spain
- StrawberryNet, Romania
- ZaMirNet, Croatia
- ComLink, Germany (See de:CL-Netz for German article)

=== Africa ===
- ArabDev, Egypt
- Fantsuam Foundation, Nigeria
- Arid Lands Information Network (East Africa), Kenya
- Community Education Computer Society (CECS), South Africa
- SANGONeT, South Africa
- Ungana-Afrika, South Africa
- Women'sNet, South Africa
- WOUGNET - Women of Uganda Network, Uganda
- AZUR Développement, Republic of the Congo
- Kenya ICT Action Network (KICTANet), Kenya
- Collaboration on International ICT Policy for East and Southern Africa (CIPESA), Uganda

=== Asia-Pacific ===
- Bytes for All.org, South Asia
- Foundation for Media Alternatives (FMA), Philippines
- JCA-NET, Japan
- JCafe, Japan
- Korean Progressive Network Center (Jinbonet), South Korea
- Open Institute of Cambodia, Cambodia
- WomensHub, Philippines
- Bangladesh Friendship Education Society (BFES) - Bangladesh
- Voices for Interactive Choice and Empowerment (VOICE), Bangladesh
- Digital Empowerment Foundation (DEF), India
- Society for Promotion of Alternative Computing and Employment (SPACE), India

== Actions ==
=== Gender evaluation methodology (GEM) ===
The Gender Evaluation Methodology is an evaluation methodology that integrates a gender analysis into evaluations of initiatives that use information and communications technologies (ICTs) for social change. It is an evaluation tool for determining whether ICTs are really improving or worsening women's lives and gender relations, as well as for promoting positive change at the individual, institutional, community and broader social levels. It was first developed in 2002 and was tried and tested by thirty community-based organisations. Since then hundreds of people have become involved in GEM's development including people who developed the tool, who train in how to use GEM, who are adapting GEM to increase its applicability to rural ICT4D projects, telecentres, software localisation and ICT policy advocacy and who are now offering GEM evaluations on a consultancy basis. The GEM manual was written in English and has been translated into French, Spanish, Brazilian Portuguese and Arabic). GEM was developed by the APC Women's Rights Programme (APC WRP

=== Global Information Society Watch ===
Global Information Society Watch is an annual report co-produced by APC and Hivos, a Dutch organization for development, which looks at the progress being made in creating an inclusive information society worldwide (particularly in implementing World Summit on the Information Society goals), encourages critical debate and strengthens networking and advocacy for a just, inclusive information society. The country reports are easy to read and offer a quick insight into a country situation. Contributors are primarily from civil society organisations active in ICT issues in their countries. Themes covered include environment and ICTs, human rights and the internet and internet infrastructure. There is a Giswatch book website.

GISWatch editions by year:

- GISWatch 2019 - Artificial intelligence: human rights, social justice and development
- GISWatch 2018 - Community networks
- GISWatch 2017 - National and Regional Internet Governance Forum Initiatives (NRIs)
- GISWatch 2017 Special Issue - Internet governance from the edges - National and regional IGFs in their own words
- GISWatch 2017 Special Issue - Unshackling expression - A study on laws criminalising expression online in Asia
- GISWatch 2016 - Economic, Social and Cultural Rights and the Internet
- GISWatch 2015 - Sexual Rights and the Internet
- GISWatch 2014 - Communications surveillance in the digital age
- GISWatch 2013 - Women's rights, gender and ICTs
- GISWatch 2012 - The internet and corruption
- GISWatch 2011 - Internet rights and democratisation
- GISWatch 2010 - ICTs and Environmental Sustainability
- GISWatch 2009 - Access to Online Information and Knowledge
- GISWatch 2008 - Access to Infrastructure
- GISWatch 2007 - Participation

=== ActionApps ===
ActionApps offer a low cost solution for content sharing that both increases the functionality of not-for-profit and NGO websites, and facilitates the creation of portals sites so as to improve the visibility of civil society information. They are driven by free software. ActionApps were first developed by APC and released to the free and open source software community. Development continues strongly in South America.

== Evaluations, awards and criticism ==
=== FLOSS ===
APC is awarding Chris Nicol free/libre open source software award (FLOSS or FOSS). The criteria and 2014 and 2007 winners are published.

=== Awards to people ===
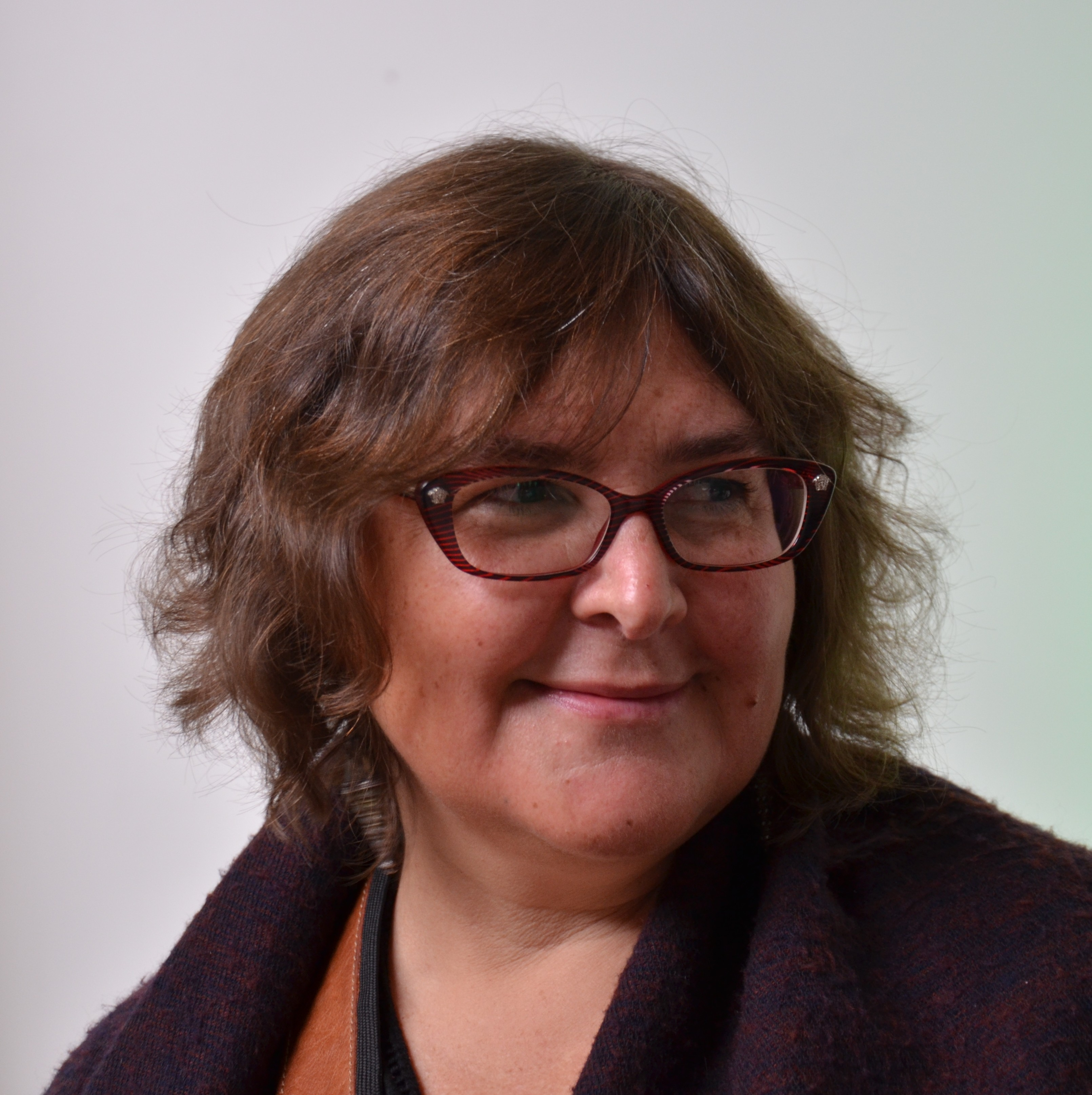
Anriette Esterhuysen at Stockholm Internet Forum 2014

- Karen Banks and the APC Women's Networking Support Programme are awarded the Anita Borg Prize for Social Impact (2004).
- Valeria Betancourt, Communications and Information Policy Programme manager, wins LACNIC's Outstanding Achievement Award, honouring internet leaders in the LAC region
- APC's Executive Director Anriette Esterhuysen and Finance Manager Karen Banks are inducted into the ISOC's Internet Hall of Fame (2013)
- APC's Executive Director Anriette Esterhuysen and APC were awarded the Electronic Frontier Foundation's 2015 Pioneer Award.

=== Awards for programs ===
- GISWatch wins WSIS Project Prize from the ITU
- Take Back the Tech! (South Africa) won GEM Award 2014 in category 6: Efforts to Reduce Threats Online and Building Women's Confidence and Security in the Use of ICTs.

=== 2013 DDoS Attack ===
Beginning at 10.15 BST on Thursday 1 August 2013 GreenNet, and consequently APC, suffered an extensive DDoS attack. The attack was later described as a "DNS reflection attack" also known as a spoofed attack Several sources linked the attack to the Zimbabwe Elections, held a day earlier. GreenNet's services were not fully operational again until 10.30 BST on Thursday 7 August. On the 9th of August there was a second attack, which, while affecting some systems, allowed GreenNet to discover the site which was being targeted. In October 2013, the target was revealed to be the site of British investigative reporter Andrew Jennings.

== See also ==
- Geekcorps – Non-profit organization
- NetCorps – Canadian non-governmental organization coalition
- Kofi Annan#United Nations Information Technology Service .28UNITeS.29 – UN Secretary-General from 1997 to 2006
- OGAS – Soviet internet-like project, automation of economy
