= FUNREDES =

Dominican organization

FUNREDES (acronym in Spanish for Fundación-Redes-y-Desarrollo, or Networks-and-Development-Foundation) was a non-governmental organization based in the Dominican Republic and dedicated to the dissemination of Information and Communication Technologies (ICT) in the developing countries, especially in Latin America and the Caribbean.

It did so in collaboration with international organizations, NGOs, the States, administrations, and public or private institutions, with the objective of contributing to regional development and integration.

Since the early 1990s, FUNREDES's position has been that: "Internet for Development" is not about plugging and playing, chatting and surfing, getting information abroad, converging to one language, one culture and one market. On the contrary, it is more about empowering people and communities, collaborating and social networking, producing local content, and facilitating a diversity of languages, cultures and opinions.

Its goal is communication above technology not the contrary.''"

A pioneer ICT4D organization since 1988, FUNREDES was a member of APC since 2006.

The main area of activities of FUNREDES included:

- Creating national networks for research and civil society
- Linguistic diversity in the Internet
- Social impact of the Internet
- Virtual communities
- Digital literacy and information ethics

FUNREDES ended its existence as an NGO in May 2017, however, the program named Linguistic and Cultural Diversity on the Internet is maintained and gained independent formal existence in 2021, maintaining on line also the Funredes site, including the library of the impactful MISTICA project (Methodologies and Social Impact of ICT in Latin America) cited in, and in a most cited paper reflecting largely the outcomes of the MISTICA project.

FUNREDES organized, within a virtual community, doted with pioneer multilingual facilities (EMEC), the collective reflection and production of documents, such as for the World Summit for the Information Society (WSIS), or, a collective work of the virtual community of some 500 academics and social society players in the field of ICT4D (Information and Communication Technologies for Development).

FUNREDES was an active player from civil society during the early stages of the WSIS process and reflected its actions in a dedicated webpage (FUNREDES@WSIS).

Among the many projects defined and managed by FUNREDES, CARDICIS: Information Society and Cultural Diversity at the Caribbean, was, one of the most notable, in its intent to weight the importance of dealing with linguistic and cultural diversity in the building of information societies, especially in the Caribbean.

On the importance of linguistic diversity in the digital realm, FUNREDES has been a pioneer in two fronts: 1) providing methods and series of results to measure the proportion of languages in the Web and 2) as an early experimenter and designer of methodologies for the introduction of automatic translation in electronic conferences. FUNREDES has also been an early promotor of the importance of including media and information literacy in policies for digital inclusion, organizing workshops and conferences for Internet users as early as 1992 and as a co-writer of the Toledo declaration on Information Literacy (2006).

A description of FUNREDES endeavors, from 1988 to 1995, is documented in a paper, part of the minutes of the IV Symposium of the History of Computer Science in Latin America and the Caribbean (SHIALC2016, Valparaiso, 10-14/10/2016).
