= SIM Registration Act =

2022 Philippine law

Congress of the Philippines
- Long title: An Act Requiring The Registration of Subscriber Identity Module
- Citation: Republic Act No. 11934
- Territorial extent: Philippines
- Enacted by: House of Representatives of the Philippines
- Enacted: September 19, 2022
- Enacted by: Senate of the Philippines
- Enacted: September 27, 2022
- Signed by: Bongbong Marcos
- Signed: October 10, 2022
- Commenced: December 27, 2022
- Effective: October 28, 2022

Legislative history

Initiating chamber: House of Representatives of the Philippines
- Bill title: An Act Requiring The Registration of Subscriber Identity Module Cards
- Bill citation: House Bill No. 14
- Introduced by: Martin Romualdez (Leyte–1st), Yedda Marie Romualdez (Tingog Sinirangan), Sandro Marcos (Ilocos Norte–1st), Jude Acidre (Tingog Sinirangan)
- Introduced: June 30, 2022
- First reading: September 12, 2022
- Second reading: September 14, 2022
- Third reading: September 20, 2022
- Voting summary: 250 voted for; 6 voted against; None abstained; 56 absent
- Committee report: Committee Report No, 30

Revising chamber: Senate of the Philippines
- Bill title: An Act Eradicating Mobile Phone or Electronic Communication-aided Criminal Activities, Regulating For This Purpose The Registration And Use of All Subscriber Identity Module (SIM) For Electronic Devices
- Bill citation: Senate Bill No. 1310
- Received from the House of Representatives of the Philippines: September 13, 2022
- Member(s) in charge: Grace Poe
- First reading: September 14, 2022
- Second reading: September 19, 2022
- Third reading: September 27, 2022
- Voting summary: 20 voted for; None voted against; None abstained; 4 absent
- Committee report: Committee Report No. 5
- Conference committee bill passed by House of Representatives of the Philippines: September 28, 2022
- Conference committee bill passed by Senate of the Philippines: September 28, 2022
- Status: In force

The SIM Registration Act, officially designated as Republic Act No. 11934 and commonly referred to as the SIM card law, is a Philippine law mandating the registration of SIM cards before activation. Under the measure, mobile device users must register their SIM cards, whether prepaid or postpaid. The law was enacted intending to curb cybercriminal activities. The law also aims to address issues related to trolling, hate speech, and online disinformation.

Human rights groups, media organizations, computer professionals, and labor groups have raised questions about how the law might violate rights to free speech, privacy, and due process.

== Legislative history ==
=== 18th Congress ===
A similar bill was initially passed in the 18th Congress but was vetoed by President Rodrigo Duterte on April 14, 2022, due to the inclusion of social media accounts, which Duterte "was constrained to disagree" with as it may "give rise to a situation of dangerous state intrusion and surveillance threatening many constitutionally protected rights".

=== House Bill No. 14 ===
The bill was filed before the House of Representatives as House Bill No. 14. It passed on third and final reading on September 19, 2022, with 250 members voting for the measure while 6 voted against it.

=== Senate Bill No. 1310 ===
Senator Grace Poe sponsored the measure's Senate counterpart, Senate Bill No. 1310. It passed on third and final reading on September 27, 2022, with all Senators present voting for the bill.

=== Republic Act No. 11934 ===
President Bongbong Marcos signed the law on October 10, 2022. After fifteen days, it was published in the Official Gazette the law effective on October 28, 2022.

== Implementation ==
The NTC released the Implementing Rules and Regulations (IRR) of the law on December 12, 2022. It was enacted on December 27, 2022. Postpaid subscribers are considered to already be registered with telco companies, only having to confirm the existing details already saved with the telco companies. On the other hand, prepaid subscribers are required to undergo registration through an online portal. During the first day of registration, users struggled to register their SIMs as telco companies faced glitches on their registration platforms. By April 23, 2023, a few days before the original deadline, about 82.8 million SIMs were registered (49.31% of total active mobile subscribers). The deadline was later extended 90 days into July 25 upon appeals by telecom companies due to low percentage of registered SIM cards.

The deactivation of unregistered SIM cards started on July 26, 2023. Subscribers were given a five-day grace period to register their SIM cards until July 30, 2023. By the end of the grace period, the NTC reported that 113,969,014 SIM cards (or 67.83% of the 168,016,400 SIM cards in circulation) were registered. A total of 54,047,386 unregistered SIM cards were deactivated, resulting in the reduction of mobile subscribers:

- Globe Telecom registered 53,727,298 subscribers (down from 86,746,672 subscribers in 2022, a total of 33,019,374 subscribers were deactivated)
- Smart Communications registered 52,500,870 subscribers (down from 66,304,761 subscribers in 2022, a total of 13,803,891 subscribers were deactivated)
- Dito Telecommunity registered 7,740,346 subscribers (down from 14,964,967 subscribers in 2022, a total of 7,224,621 subscribers were deactivated)

== Human rights and freedom of expression ==
Media advocacy groups and labor groups petitioned the Supreme Court of the Philippines for a temporary restraining order (TRO) for the implementation of the law, arguing that the law violates free speech, data privacy, and due process. The petition called the law a form of "constitutionally impermissible prior restraint". The Supreme Court denied the TRO petition but ordered government agencies to submit their responses to questions regarding the law's constitutionality.

Human rights groups called on Congress to repeal the law, citing issues relating to "rights to privacy, free expression and information, association, and non-discrimination in the Philippines". An online petition started by the Computer Professionals' Union challenging the law contended that the law erodes freedom of expression and could be used for mass surveillance and authoritarianism when used alongside the Philippine Anti-Terror Law.
