= Computer Professionals' Union =

Professional organization in the Philippines

- Abbreviation: CPU
- Formation: 2001
- Type: Non-stock, non-profit
- Purpose: Advancing Information Communication Technology for the Filipino people
- Headquarters: Quezon City
- Location: Philippines
- Official languages: Filipino, English
- Chairperson: Kim Cantillas
- Secretary General: Franklin Maraya
- Website: cpuict.org

The Computer Professionals' Union (CPU or CP-Union) is a mass organization of information and communications technology (ICT) professionals, practitioners, and workers in the Philippines. It is registered in the Philippines as a non-stock, non-profit, non-government organization that promotes activist ICT principles and organize ICT professionals to provide ICT services to Filipino people. Their office is located at Quezon City and their current chairperson is Kim Cantillas.

Some of CPU initiatives include Software Freedom Day celebration in the Manila, promotion of Free and Open Source Software including Drupal, the Philippine Digital Justice Initiative and collaboration with Wikimedia Philippines.

== History ==
The organization was started in 2001 by a group of information communications technology practitioners. They officially registered under the Philippine Securities and Exchange Commission in 2008 as a non-profit and non-stock corporation.

== Activism ==
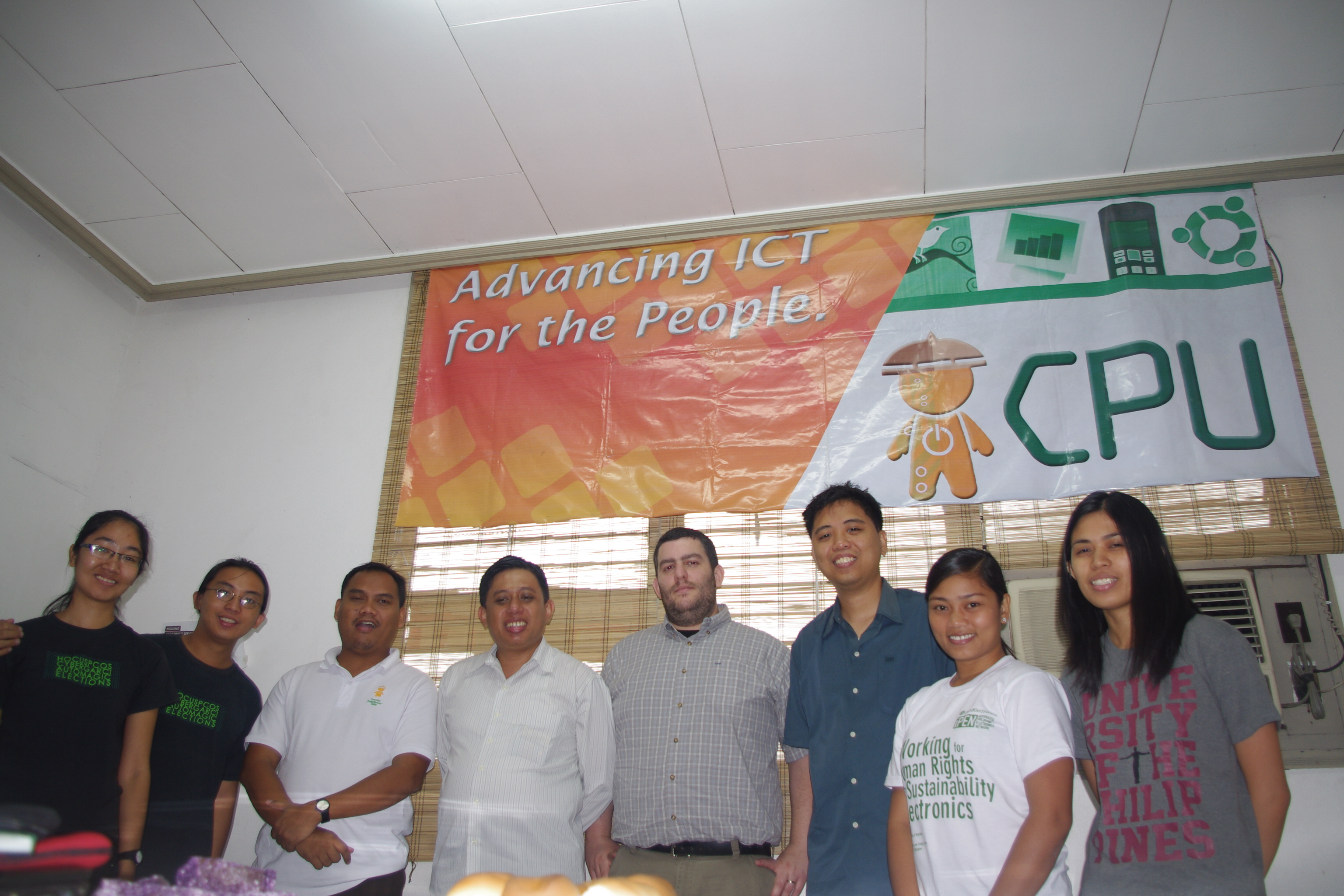
Meeting of Wikimedia Foundation, Wikimedia Philippines, and Computer Professionals' Union at the CPU office in Quezon City. Third from the left is National Director Rick Bahague, and first from the right is Deputy National Director Gladys Regalado

CPU is notable for its belief that the ICT sector in the Philippines is controlled and dominated by foreign monopoly capitalists, which stunts the growth and development of Filipino technology and economy. CPU supports a truly nationalist and democratic government that will advance and promote a people's ICT. CPU believes that, like farmers, workers, and other sectors in the country, ICT workers also need to organize in order to advance their specific needs.

A year before the 2010 Philippine general elections, CPU warns sophisticated cheating with the Philippines' first automated polls. They had hosted a national conference in University of the Philippines in Diliman, Quezon City to discuss the automated election system (AES). Rick Bahague, CPU National Coordinator said that the goal of the conference was to gather experiences and best practices in technologies relevant to AES. He further said that software bugs in the AES system can affect machines to be used in the elections and the automated election system is vulnerable to manipulation from inside or outside attacks.

During the height of the protests against Stop Online Piracy Act (SOPA) and PROTECT IP Act (PIPA) in January 2012, CPU expressed strong opposition to it. They said that SOPA and PIPA that were being pushed in the United States Congress attack free speech and expression and would have impacts to human rights groups, bloggers, advocacy groups and all content creators in the web. They believed that any website can be closed without due process.

In September 2012, Philippine President Aquino signed the Cybercrime Prevention Act of 2012 enacted by 15th Congress of the Philippines. The law had led numerous sectors including Computer Professionals' Union to protest it. According to CPU, sections of the law may have various interpretations that may lead to intentional or non-intentional misinterpretations by State authorities wherein computer users can be punished without due process. They further said that Section 19 of the law has become far worse than SOPA and PIPA.

In 2021, CPU launched the Philippine Digital Justice Initiative.

In October 2022, Philippine President Marcos Jr. signed the SIM Card Registration Act. CPU condemned the enactment of the SIM Registration Act, saying that the law risks people's right to privacy and data protection.

== Organization tenets ==
In advancing CPU's advocacy, these are their principles:

- Free Information: CPU believes that information in all forms is the collective knowledge and experience of humankind. It believes that no one owns information; therefore, anyone can use and develop it for the benefit of mankind and development of society.
- Privacy of Information: Computers and telecommunications networks have brought consumers many conveniences. But, the organization alleges, advanced technologies pose serious threats to privacy. CPU believes that information about us, our families, where we live, where we work, people we call, sites we surf, stores we shop in, etc., should be kept private.
- Open Source: CPU fully supports the open source initiative. One of the group's aims is to convince fellow technology practitioners and the government to abandon the use of software by companies such as Microsoft and Oracle Corporation.
- Right to organize: CPU members believe that as workers, they have the right to form labor unions and associations that will collectively fight for workers' rights and welfare.
- Use of Appropriate Technology: CPU believes that technology alone cannot solve political and social problems. It aims to dispel myths about the infallibility of technological systems and neutrality of science and technology.

== See also ==
- Foundation for Media Alternatives

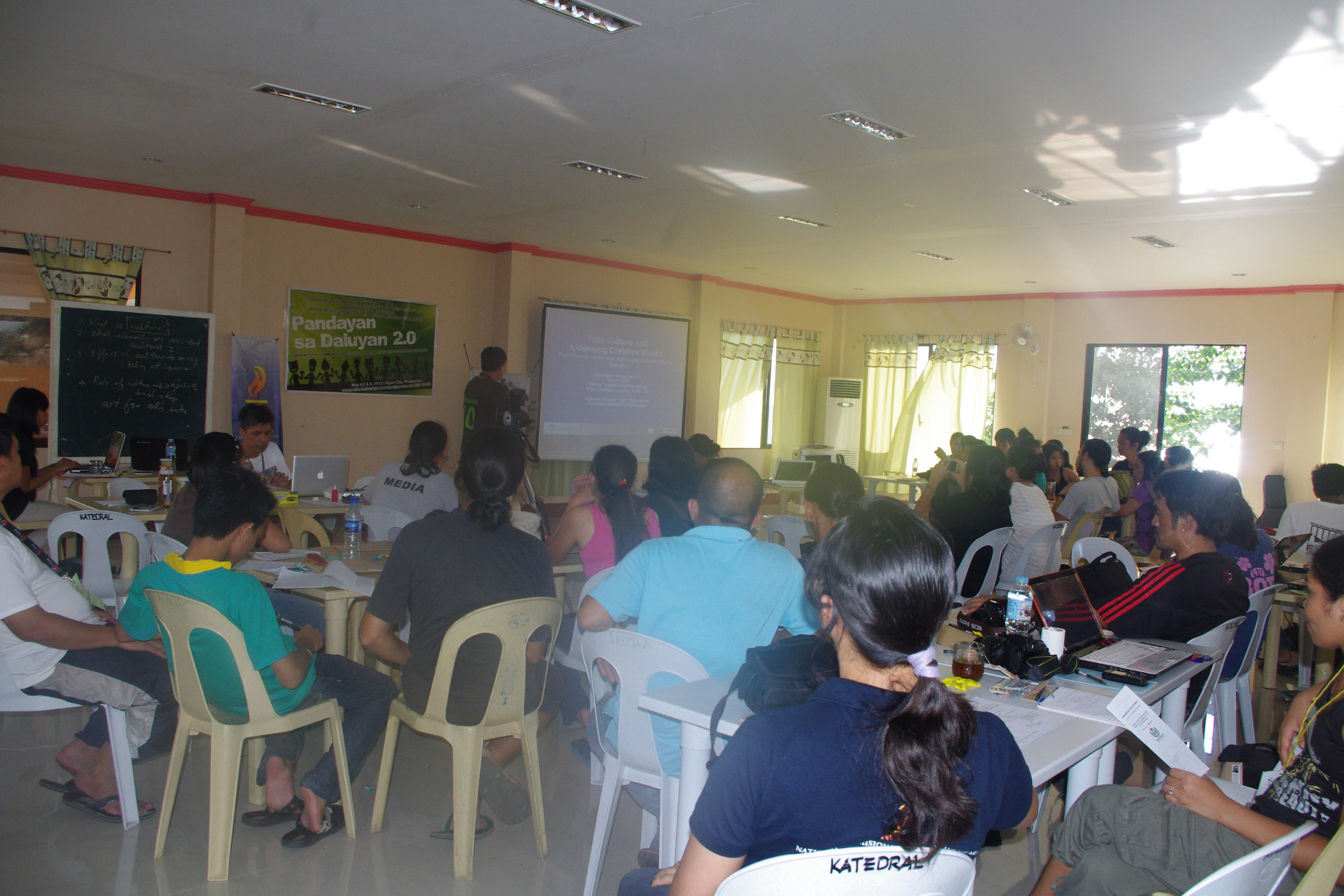
Pandayan sa Daluyan, an event organized by CPU in May 2012 at Iligan City in Mindanao
