= LaborNet =

LaborNet is an AFL–CIO-backed online network focused on the labour movement.

== History ==
LaborNet was launched following the 1990 NAFTA which created an interest to develop stronger union networks across borders to grow leverage against multinational corporations. Several bulletin board services were set up. Aside from LaborNet, SoliNet was created in Canada and LaNeta in Mexico.

The LaborNet internet network was created in 1991 (or 1990) by the AFL–CIO (or the IGC/APC) to give a new boost to the labor movement. LaborNet was organized around industrial lines, allowing workers from different unions to communicate with each others.

The intent of LaborNet was to develop a labor-focused social network for activism. It was AFL-CIO's first two-way communication tool. Users had access to forums and could upload pdf files.

By 1992, LaborNet migrated its hosting to CompuServe. By 1995, LaborNet had 1000 subscribers, including 35 community labor councils. It moved to its own independent website in 1999. The plan was to further develop the social features of the website. By the end of the 1990s, LaborNet had 1,400 members. In 2001, LaborNet was established in Japan, where it held annual awareness events such as the Labor Fiesta and Union, Yes!.

== Description ==
According to LaborNet's website, its "founders believe that the new communication technology must be put to use to revitalize and rebuild the labor movement." LaborNet aims to act as a syndicator for labor-related news and calls to actions

LaborNets are also set up in Canada, United Kingdom, Austria, Germany, Japan and Korea.
