= CEPES =

Civil society organization specializing in rural development based in Peru

(Peruvian Center for Social Studies) is a civil society organization specializing in rural development based in Peru.

The Peruvian Center for Social Studies ( Centro Peruano de Estudios Sociales - CEPES) is a private Civil Society Organization ( not for profit) institution based in Peru, founded in 1976. CEPES specializes in agrarian and rural development issues. It is headquartered in the city of Lima and, since 1998, and also has a regional office in Huancavelica.

CEPES objective is to improve the conditions of rural access to land and other natural resources, contribute to social economic sustainability and continued roles as guarantors of the country's food security and support their effective adaptation to climate change.

CEPES actions are geared towards capacity building, research and advocacy, and influencing changes in national and regional agricultural and rural policies in favour of family farmers. These actions take into account gender, intercultural and rights-based approaches.

== Programs ==
Access to natural resources

Peru faces a serious problem of inequality in access, control and distribution of land and other natural resources. The situation is exacerbated by the existence of a regulatory framework and public policies that promote private investment in any type of economic activity on land, affecting indigenous peoples and family farmers in the country. In response to this, CEPES produces reliable and accessible research and information that contributes to their well-being and the defense of their rights over the land and territory they occupy, their main means of livelihood and the basis of their identity.

Food security

A significant portion of the Peruvian population does not have guaranteed food security, and chronic malnutrition is particularly serious in rural areas, where high poverty rate is most evident. While the government of Peru continues to promote export of agricultural products, anemia continues to affect children and pregnant women. In response to this situation, CEPES seeks to work with organizations and schools in Huancavelica to incorporate healthy diets into their agenda, as well as to advocate for diet related policies at the national and regional levels to benefit the indigenous Peruvians.

Climate change

The impacts of global warming are clearly perceptible on the production and quality of life of rural families and constitute a new risk for food security. In light of this scenario, CEPES promotes the development and implementation, by family farming, of ecosystem-based climate change adaptation initiatives.

== Lines of action ==
Research and monitoring

Capacity building

Communication and advocacy

Its activities include creating and disseminating information and knowledge through publications, magazines, electronic bulletins and radio broadcasts. Its publications include:

- Debate Agrario (a research journal)
- La Revista Agraria (a magazine focusing on agrarian and rural development issues)
- Informativo Legal Agrario (a legal review published three times a year)
- Notiagro, an online daily round-up of agrarian and rural news
- electronic bulletins on the coffee-growing, livestock-farming and milk-producing industries in Peru.

The CEPES website is in Spanish and includes agrarian and rural statistics; rural and agrarian news; audio from radio broadcasts; and downloadable articles from La Revista Agraria and Debate Agrario. The Centre is in Lima.
