= Take Back The Tech! =

Take Back The Tech is a collaborative global campaign that connects the issue of violence against women and information and communications technology (ICT). It aims to raise awareness on the way violence against women is occurring on ICT platforms such as the Internet and mobile phones, and to call for people to use ICT in activism to end violence against women.

It was initiated by the Association for Progressive Communications, Women's Networking Support Programme, in 2006. Since then, the campaign has been taken up and organised by individuals, collectives and non-governmental organizations in at least 24 countries.

The name Take Back The Tech! was inspired by the Take Back the Night (or Reclaim the Night) movement, an international feminist march and rally to take direct action against rape and other forms of violence against women.

== Issue ==
The campaign highlights the way that violence against women is taking new forms through the use of ICT. This includes:

- Online harassment. For example, when a harasser sends repeated, unwanted, threatening and/or sexualised messages through the use of email or SMS. This can also include posting personal information about the victim and/or digitally altered images of the victim on public forums and websites, often accompanied by messages that solicit sexual or violent responses.
- Cyberstalking. For example, the use of social networking platforms such as Facebook and Twitter to track a person's activity and movements, the use of spyware to monitor a person's computer and Internet use, and the use of global satellite positioning devices to track a person's physical movement and location, usually by a domestic violence abuser.
- Online violation of privacy and blackmail. For example, actual or threatened posting of private photographs and video clips that are usually sexualised in nature on Internet sites with the aim to humiliate another person, or to make the person comply with the demands of the poster.

Research indicates that the majority of technology-enabled forms of violence victims are women.

The campaign also recognises that the gender digital divide contributes to unequal power relations that create enabling contexts for violence against women to occur. To address this disparity, campaigners are encouraged to:

- Recall and give recognition to the historical contribution that women have made into the development of ICT, such as the contribution of Ada Lovelace and Grace Hopper.
- Build the capacity of women and girls in the use of new ICT.
- Foster an attitude of experimentation and play with new ICT to overcome technophobia.
- Engage in activism and advocacy to improve Internet policy development that takes the gendered dimension of ICT into account.

== Campaigns and recognition ==
Throughout the year, Take Back the Tech! runs smaller campaigns, publishes articles and zines and organizes events.

In 2013, Bytes for All, Pakistan, the human rights organization that runs the local Take Back The Tech! campaign in Pakistan, was awarded the Avon Communication Award under the 'Innovative Campaign Award' category for leading an exemplary national campaign in Pakistan. The award was presented by Salma Hayek at the United Nations Headquarters.
