= VOICE Bangladesh =

VOICES FOR INTERACTIVE CHOICE AND EMPOWERMENT (VOICE) is a Bangladesh-based rights-focused research, advocacy and development organization headquartered in Dhaka, Bangladesh. Established in 2002, the organization works on issues relating to human rights, right to information, communication justice, privacy rights, data protection, freedom of expression, digital rights, aid and development effectiveness, economic justice, food sovereignty, climate justice, public health, and countering hate speech and misinformation.

VOICE works in Bangladesh and internationally through research, public education, policy dialogue and strategic partnerships.

== History ==
VOICE was established in 2002 as a civil society organization focused on rights-based advocacy and policy research. Since its founding, it has engaged in campaigns, publications, training programmes and policy initiatives on governance, development and justice issues.

The organization is registered with the NGO Affairs Bureau under the Prime Minister's Office of Bangladesh.

== Mission ==
VOICE states that its mission is to build a pluralist society drawing on the interactions, choices and power of indigenous cultures and resources.

== Programmes and approaches ==
VOICE describes itself as a rights-based organization working with diverse stakeholders, including:

- Civil society organizations
- Human rights defenders
- Journalists
- Women's groups
- Youth communities
- Grassroots organizations

Its programmes are based on principles of universal human rights, justice for all, inclusive governance and sustainable development.

The organization uses a combination of:

- Research and evidence-based advocacy
- Public education
- Strategic partnerships
- Policy dialogue
- Capacity building
- Community empowerment
- Coalition building
- Networking initiatives

VOICE also seeks to create linkages between local realities and national or global policy processes.

== Areas of work ==
VOICE has undertaken programmes and advocacy in the following areas:

- Human rights
- Right to information
- Communication justice
- Privacy rights
- Data protection
- Freedom of expression
- Digital rights
- Climate justice
- Food sovereignty
- Economic justice
- Aid effectiveness
- Governance and accountability
- Public health programmes
- Countering hate speech
- Countering misinformation
- Sustainable development

== Climate justice ==
VOICE has been active in climate justice campaigns in Bangladesh and internationally. Since 2008, it has undertaken initiatives concerning climate-induced displacement, adaptation policy and the rights of affected communities.

The organization has supported the International Campaign on Climate Refugees’ Rights (ICCR), advocating recognition and legal protection for climate-displaced populations.

VOICE has also published policy briefs and research on climate finance and the role of international financial institutions such as the Asian Development Bank in Bangladesh.

At the grassroots level, it has worked with local organizations and communities on climate resilience, networking and capacity-strengthening initiatives.

== Digital rights and communication ==
VOICE has worked on internet governance, communication rights, privacy, surveillance, online safety and freedom of expression. It has advocated stronger safeguards for digital rights and civic space online.

== International cooperation ==
VOICE has carried out research and advocacy activities in collaboration with or with support from international organizations, including:

- Privacy International (United Kingdom)
- Global Partners Digital and related UK-based partners
- OpenNet Initiative (Canada)
- Bank Information Center (United States)
- EURODAD (Belgium)
- Asia Pacific Research Network
- Reality of Aid Network
- Jubilee South Asia Pacific Movement on Debt and Development

== Memberships and networks ==
VOICE has participated in a number of national and international civil society networks, including:

- Association for Progressive Communications (APC)
- Communication Rights in the Information Society (CRIS)
- World Association for Christian Communication (WACC)
- World Association of Community Radio Broadcasters (AMARC)
- NGO Forum on ADB
- UN Internet Governance Forum (IGF)

== Development agenda ==
VOICE has been involved in advocacy relating to the post-2015 global development agenda. It also served in a co-chair role in the Global CSO Forum during a High Level Meeting in Bali, Indonesia.

The organization has also participated in discussions concerning aid coordination and development effectiveness, including forums linked to the OECD Working Party on Aid Effectiveness.

== Publications ==
VOICE has published books, reports and research papers on topics including:

- Climate change
- Development effectiveness
- Media freedom
- Globalization
- Corporate agriculture
- Human rights
- Privacy rights
- ICT and development
- Governance and accountability
- Economic justice

== Leadership ==
Ahmed Swapan Mahmud has served as Executive Director of VOICE.

== Headquarters ==
VOICE is based in the Shyamoli area of Dhaka, Bangladesh.
