= StrawberryNet =

StrawberryNet is a Romanian NGO network aimed at promoting "the protection of the environment, sustainable development, democracy and human rights" in Romania, using electronic telecommunication and ICT (information and communication technologies).

It is organized as a self-coordination body of NGOs providing or using information and communication services. It is, in legal terms, a foundation.

In the recent past (2003–04), StrawberryNet has been involved in supporting a website that gave a voice to mining-affected residents in a historic and picturesque Romanian village, some 400 km north of Bucharest.

Canada-headquartered Roșia Montană Gold Corporation was then planning to take to court the Alburnus Maior non-profit organisation, to prevent it from publishing its rosiamontana.org website.

Roșia Montană Gold Corporation had anticipated carrying out Europe's largest open-cast mining development in the area, even though it would mean the involuntary resettlement of over 2,000 persons, and the potential destruction of a unique archaeological and natural site.

For the villagers, the website gave a voice to tell the world about their opposition to mining. StrawberryNet took cover of an internet rights charter, to establish that the Canadian-Romanian mining corporation was violating the right to communicate and the freedom of expression and information exchange, by their act of suing the promoter of the site rosiamontana.org. Roșia Montană Gold Corporation is a joint-venture between Minvest, a Romanian, state-owned company and Gabriel Resources, a company registered in Toronto and, offshore, in Barbados and Jersey (the latter company was founded by serial entrepreneur and convicted heroin dealer Frank Timiş.)
