= GreenNet =

English not-for-profit Internet service provider

- Founded: 1985
- Type: Non-profit; ISP
- Location: London
- Website: https://gn.apc.org

GreenNet is a not-for-profit Internet service provider based in London, England. It was one of the first ISPs in the United Kingdom.

== Establishment and operation ==
Established in 1985 "as an effective and cheap way for environmental activists to communicate". In 1987 the Joseph Rowntree Charitable Trust gave GreenNet a grant to enable it to bring a large number of peace groups online, and "After a few years they became one of the first internet service providers in Britain". GreenNet formed an international link with IGC and was a founder member of the Association for Progressive Communications, established in 1990. The registered charity GreenNet Charitable Trust was established in 1994 and owns GreenNet.

== GnFido ==
GreenNet developed a Fido gateway, GnFido, which allowed access to basic internet facilities such as email using a store-and-forward system. Maintained by Karen Banks, it provided the only available cheap and accessible internet access for thousands of individuals and organisations in Africa, South Asia and Eastern Europe.

== 2013 DDoS attack ==
On 1 August 2013, GreenNet and the Association for Progressive Communications (APC) suffered an extensive DDoS attack. The attack was later described as a "DNS reflection attack" also known as a spoofed attack Several sources initially suspected the attack was linked to the Zimbabwean Elections, which had been held on the previous day. GreenNet's services were not fully operational again until 10.30 BST on Thursday 7 August. On 9 August there was a second attack, which, while affecting some systems, allowed GreenNet to discover the site which was being targeted. In October 2013, the target was revealed to be the site of investigative reporter Andrew Jennings.

== 2014 legal action on GCHQ hacking ==
In July 2014 Privacy International, GreenNet and five other Internet service providers took GCHQ, the UK security service, to the Investigatory Powers Tribunal, alleging breach of privacy and breaking into their networks. The case ultimately failed, but GCHQ were forced to admit clandestine hacking activities. GreenNet were shortlisted for ISPA's Internet Hero of the year 2015.

== See also ==
- Internet in the United Kingdom
