= Cyberstalking =

Use of the Internet as means of monitoring users' activities maliciously

Cyberstalking is the use of the Internet or other electronic means to stalk or harass an individual, group, or organization. It may include false accusations, defamation, slander and libel. It may also include monitoring, identity theft, threats, vandalism, solicitation for sex, doxing, or blackmail. These unwanted behaviors are perpetrated online and cause intrusion into an individual's digital life as well as negatively impact a victim's mental and emotional well-being, as well as their sense of safety and security online.

Cyberstalking is often accompanied by realtime or offline stalking. In many jurisdictions, such as California, both are criminal offenses. Both are motivated by a desire to control, intimidate or influence a victim. A stalker may be an online stranger or a person whom the target knows. They may be anonymous and solicit involvement of other people online who do not even know the target.

Cyberstalking is a criminal offense under various state anti-stalking, slander and harassment laws. A conviction can result in a restraining order, probation, or criminal penalties against the assailant, including jail.

== Definitions and description ==
There have been a number of attempts by experts and legislators to define cyberstalking. It is generally understood to be the use of the Internet or other electronic means to stalk or harass an individual, a group, or an organization. Cyberstalking is a form of cyberbullying; the terms are often used interchangeably in the media. Both may include false accusations, defamation, slander and libel.

Cyberstalking may also include monitoring, identity theft, threats, vandalism, solicitation for sex, or gathering information that may be used to threaten or harass. Cyberstalking is often accompanied by real-time or offline stalking. Both forms of stalking may be criminal offenses.

Stalking is a continuous process, consisting of a series of actions, each of which may be entirely legal in itself. Technology ethics professor Lambèr Royakkers defines cyberstalking as perpetrated by someone without a current relationship with the victim. About the abusive effects of cyberstalking, he writes that:

[Stalking] is a form of mental assault, in which the perpetrator repeatedly, unwantedly, and disruptively breaks into the life-world of the victim, with whom he has no relationship (or no longer has), with motives that are directly or indirectly traceable to the affective sphere. Moreover, the separated acts that make up the intrusion cannot by themselves cause the mental abuse, but do taken together (cumulative effect).

=== Distinguishing cyberstalking from other acts ===
There is a distinction between cyber-trolling and cyber-stalking. Research has shown that actions that can be perceived to be harmless as a one-off can be considered to be trolling, whereas if it is part of a persistent campaign then it can be considered stalking.

TM	Motive	Mode	Gravity	Description
1	Playtime	Cyber-bantering	Cyber-trolling	In the moment and quickly regret
2	Tactical	Cyber-trickery	Cyber-trolling	In the moment but do not regret and continue
3	Strategic	Cyber-bullying	Cyber-stalking	Go out of way to cause problems, but without a sustained and planned long-term campaign
4	Domination	Cyber-hickery	Cyber-stalking	Goes out of the way to create rich media to target one or more specific individuals

Cyberstalking author Alexis Moore separates cyberstalking from identity theft, which is financially motivated. Her definition, which was also used by the Republic of the Philippines in their legal description, is as follows:

Cyberstalking is a technologically-based "attack" on one person who has been targeted specifically for that attack for reasons of anger, revenge or control. Cyberstalking can take many forms, including:

1. harassment, embarrassment and humiliation of the victim
2. emptying bank accounts or other economic control such as ruining the victim's credit score
3. harassing family, friends and employers to isolate the victim
4. scare tactics to instill fear and more

=== Identification and detection ===
CyberAngels has written about how to identify cyberstalking:

When identifying cyberstalking "in the field," and particularly when considering whether to report it to any kind of legal authority, the following features or combination of features can be considered to characterize a true stalking situation: malice, premeditation, repetition, distress, obsession, vendetta, no legitimate purpose, personally directed, disregarded warnings to stop, harassment and threats.

A number of key factors have been identified in cyberstalking:

- False accusations: Many cyberstalkers try to damage the reputation of their victim and turn other people against them. They post false information about them on websites. They may set up their own websites, blogs or user pages for this purpose. They post allegations about the victim to newsgroups, chat rooms, or other sites that allow public contributions such as Wikipedia or Amazon.com.
- Attempts to gather information about the victim: Cyberstalkers may approach their victim's friends, family and work colleagues to obtain personal information. They may advertise for information on the Internet, or hire a private detective.
- Monitoring their target's online activities and attempting to trace their IP address in an effort to gather more information about their victims.
- Encouraging others to harass the victim: Many cyberstalkers try to involve third parties in the harassment. They may claim the victim has harmed the stalker or his/her family in some way, or may post the victim's name and telephone number in order to encourage others to join the pursuit.
- False victimization: The cyberstalker will claim that the victim is harassing him or her. Bocij writes that this phenomenon has been noted in a number of well-known cases.
- Attacks on data and equipment: They may try to damage the victim's computer by sending viruses.
- Ordering goods and services: They order items or subscribe to magazines in the victim's name. These often involve subscriptions to pornography or ordering sex toys then having them delivered to the victim's workplace.
- Arranging to meet: Young people face a particularly high risk of having cyberstalkers try to set up meetings between them.
- The posting of defamatory or derogatory statements: Using web pages and message boards to incite some response or reaction from their victim.

== Prevalence and impact ==
According to Law Enforcement Technology, cyberstalking has increased with the growth of new technology and new ways to stalk victims. "Disgruntled employees pose as their bosses to post explicit messages on social network sites; spouses use GPS to track their mates' every move. Even police and prosecutors find themselves at risk, as gang members and other organized criminals find out where they live — often to intimidate them into dropping a case."

In January 2009, the Bureau of Justice Statistics in the United States released the study "Stalking Victimization in the United States," which was sponsored by the Office on Violence Against Women. The report, based on supplemental data from the National Crime Victimization Survey, showed that one in four stalking victims had been cyberstalked as well, with the perpetrators using internet-based services such as email, instant messaging, GPS, or spyware. The final report stated that approximately 1.2 million victims had stalkers who used technology to find them. The Rape, Abuse and Incest National Network (RAINN), in Washington D.C. has released statistics that there are 3.4 million stalking victims each year in the United States. Of those, one in four reported experiencing cyberstalking.

According to Robin M. Kowalski, a social psychologist at Clemson University, cyberbullying has been shown to cause higher levels of anxiety and depression for victims than normal bullying. Kowalski states that much of this stems from the anonymity of the perpetrators, which is a common feature of cyberstalking as well. According to a study by Kowalski, of 3,700 bullied middle-school students, a quarter had been subjected to a form of online harassment.

== Types ==
=== Stalking by strangers ===
According to Joey Rushing, a District Attorney of Franklin County, Alabama, there is no single definition of a cyberstalker - they can be either strangers to the victim or have a former/present relationship. "[Cyberstalkers] come in all shapes, sizes, ages and backgrounds. They patrol Web sites looking for an opportunity to take advantage of people."

=== Gender-based stalking ===
Harassment and stalking because of gender online, also known as online gender-based violence, is common, and can include rape threats and other threats of violence, as well as the posting of the victim's personal information. It is blamed for limiting victims' activities online or driving them offline entirely, thereby impeding their participation in online life and undermining their autonomy, dignity, identity, and opportunities.

=== Of intimate partners ===
Cyberstalking of intimate partners is the online harassment of a current or former romantic partner. It is a form of domestic violence, and experts say its purpose is to control the victim in order to encourage social isolation and create dependency. Harassers may send repeated insulting or threatening e-mails to their victims, monitor or disrupt their victims' e-mail use, and use the victim's account to send e-mails to others posing as the victim or to purchase goods or services the victim does not want. They may also use the Internet to research and compile personal information about the victim, to use in order to harass him or her.

=== Of celebrities and public persons ===
Profiling of stalkers shows that almost always they stalk someone they know or, via delusion, think they know, as is the case with stalkers of celebrities or public persons in which the stalkers feel they know the celebrity even though the celebrity does not know them. As part of the risk they take for being in the public eye, celebrities and public figures are often targets of lies or made-up stories in tabloids as well as by stalkers, some even seeming to be fans.

In one noted case in 2011, actress Patricia Arquette quit Facebook after alleged cyberstalking. In her last post, Arquette explained that her security warned her Facebook friends to never accept friend requests from people they do not actually know. Arquette stressed that just because people seemed to be fans did not mean they were safe. The media issued a statement that Arquette planned to communicate with fans exclusively through her Twitter account in the future.

=== By anonymous online mobs ===
Web 2.0 technologies have enabled online groups of anonymous people to self-organize to target individuals with online defamation, threats of violence and technology-based attacks. These include publishing lies and doctored photographs, threats of rape and other violence, posting sensitive personal information about victims, e-mailing damaging statements about victims to their employers, and manipulating search engines to make damaging material about the victim more prominent. Victims frequently respond by adopting pseudonyms or going offline entirely.

Experts attribute the destructive nature of anonymous online mobs to group dynamics, saying that groups with homogeneous views tend to become more extreme. As members reinforce each others' beliefs, they fail to see themselves as individuals and lose a sense of personal responsibility for their destructive acts. In doing so they dehumanize their victims, becoming more aggressive when they believe they are supported by authority figures. Internet service providers and website owners are sometimes blamed for not speaking out against this type of harassment.

A notable example of online mob harassment was the experience of American software developer and blogger Kathy Sierra. In 2007 a group of anonymous individuals attacked Sierra, threatening her with rape and strangulation, publishing her home address and Social Security number, and posting doctored photographs of her. Frightened, Sierra cancelled her speaking engagements and shut down her blog, writing "I will never feel the same. I will never be the same."

=== Corporate cyberstalking ===
Corporate cyberstalking is when a company harasses an individual online, or an individual or group of individuals harasses an organization. Motives for corporate cyberstalking are ideological, or include a desire for financial gain or revenge.

== Perpetrators ==
=== Motives and profile ===
Mental profiling of digital criminals has identified psychological and social factors that motivate stalkers as: envy; pathological obsession (professional or sexual); unemployment or failure with own job or life; intention to intimidate and cause others to feel inferior; the stalker is delusional and believes they "know" the target; the stalker wants to instill fear in a person to justify his/her status; belief they can get away with it (anonymity); intimidation for financial advantage or business competition; revenge over perceived or imagined rejection.

Four types of cyberstalkers

Preliminary work by Leroy McFarlane and Paul Bocij has identified four types of cyberstalkers: the vindictive cyberstalkers noted for the ferocity of their attacks; the composed cyberstalker whose motive is to annoy; the intimate cyberstalker who attempts to form a relationship with the victim but turns on them if rebuffed; and collective cyberstalkers, groups with a motive. According to Antonio Chacón Medina, author of Una nueva cara de Internet, El acoso ("A new face of the Internet: stalking"), the general profile of the harasser is cold, with little or no respect for others. The stalker is a predator who can wait patiently until vulnerable victims appear, such as women or children, or may enjoy pursuing a particular person, whether personally familiar to them or unknown. The harasser enjoys and demonstrates their power to pursue and psychologically damage the victim.

=== Behaviors ===
Cyberstalkers find their victims by using search engines, online forums, bulletin and discussion boards, chat rooms, and more recently, through social networking sites, such as MySpace, Facebook, Bebo, Friendster, Twitter, and Indymedia, a media outlet known for self-publishing. They may engage in live chat harassment or flaming or they may send electronic viruses and unsolicited e-mails. Cyberstalkers may research individuals to feed their obsessions and curiosity. Conversely, the acts of cyberstalkers may become more intense, such as repeatedly instant messaging their targets. More commonly they will post defamatory or derogatory statements about their stalking target on web pages, message boards, and in guest books designed to get a reaction or response from their victim, thereby initiating contact. In some cases, they have been known to create fake blogs in the name of the victim containing defamatory or pornographic content.

When prosecuted, many stalkers have unsuccessfully attempted to justify their behavior based on their use of public forums, as opposed to direct contact. Once they get a reaction from the victim, they will typically attempt to track or follow the victim's internet activity. Classic cyberstalking behavior includes the tracing of the victim's IP address in an attempt to verify their home or place of employment. Some cyberstalking situations do evolve into physical stalking, and a victim may experience abusive and excessive phone calls, vandalism, threatening or obscene mail, trespassing, and physical assault. Moreover, many physical stalkers will use cyberstalking as another method of harassing their victims.

A 2007 study led by Paige Padgett from the University of Texas Health Science Center found that there was a false degree of safety assumed by women looking for love online.

== Cyberstalking legislation ==
Legislation on cyberstalking varies from country to country. Cyberstalking and cyberbullying are relatively new phenomena, but that does not mean that crimes committed through the network are not punishable under legislation drafted for that purpose. Although there are often existing laws that prohibit stalking or harassment in a general sense, legislators sometimes believe that such laws are inadequate or do not go far enough, and thus bring forward new legislation to address this perceived shortcoming. The point overlooked is that enforcing these laws can be a challenge in these virtual communities. The reason being, these issues are unfamiliar to law enforcement agencies who have never faced cases related to cyberstalking. In the United States, for example, nearly every state has laws that address cyberstalking, cyberbullying, or both.

In countries such as the US, in practice, there is little legislative difference between the concepts of "cyberbullying" and "cyberstalking." The primary distinction is one of age; if adults are involved, the act is usually termed cyberstalking, while among children it is usually referred to as cyberbullying. However, as there have not been any formal definitions of the terms, this distinction is one of semantics and many laws treat bullying and stalking as much the same issue.

=== Australia ===
In Australia, the Stalking Amendment Act (1999) includes the use of any form of technology to harass a target as forms of "criminal stalking."

=== Canada ===
In 2012, there was a high-profile investigation into the death of Amanda Todd, a young Canadian student who had been blackmailed and stalked online before committing suicide. The Royal Canadian Mounted Police were criticized in the media for not naming one of her alleged stalkers as a person of interest.

=== Philippines ===
In the Fifteenth Congress of the Republic of the Philippines, a cyberstalking bill was introduced by Senator Manny Villar. The result was to "urge the Senate Committees on Science and Technology, and Public Information and Mass Media to conduct an inquiry, in aid of legislation, on the increasing occurrence of cyber stalking cases and the modus operandi adopted in the internet to perpetuate crimes with the end in view of formulating legislation and policy measures geared towards curbing cyber stalking and other cyber crimes and protect online users in the country."

=== United States ===
==== History, current legislation ====
Cyberstalking is a criminal offense under American anti-stalking, slander, and harassment laws.

A conviction can result in a restraining order, probation, or criminal penalties against the assailant, including jail. Cyberstalking specifically has been addressed in recent U.S. federal law. For example, the Violence Against Women Act, passed in 2000, made cyberstalking a part of the federal interstate stalking statute. The current US Federal Anti-Cyber-Stalking law is found at 47 U.S.C. § 223.

Still, there remains a lack of federal legislation to specifically address cyberstalking, leaving the majority of legislative at the state level. A few states have both stalking and harassment statutes that criminalize threatening and unwanted electronic communications. The first anti-stalking law was enacted in California in 1990, and while all fifty states soon passed anti-stalking laws, by 2009 only 14 of them had laws specifically addressing "high-tech stalking." The first U.S. cyberstalking law went into effect in 1999 in California. Other states have laws other than harassment or anti-stalking statutes that prohibit misuse of computer communications and e-mail, while others have passed laws containing broad language that can be interpreted to include cyberstalking behaviors, such as in their harassment or stalking legislation.

Sentences can range from 18 months in prison and a $10,000 fine for a fourth-degree charge to ten years in prison and a $150,000 fine for a second-degree charge.

States with cyberstalking legislation

- Alabama, Arizona, Connecticut, Hawaii, Illinois, New Hampshire, and New York have included prohibitions against harassing electronic, computer or e-mail communications in their harassment legislation.
- Alaska, Florida, Oklahoma, Wyoming, and California, have incorporated electronically communicated statements as conduct constituting stalking in their anti-stalking laws.
- Texas enacted the Stalking by Electronic Communications Act, 2001.
- Missouri revised its state harassment statutes to include stalking and harassment by telephone and electronic communications (as well as cyber-bullying) after the Megan Meier suicide case of 2006. In one of the few cases where a cyberstalking conviction was obtained the cyberstalker was a woman, which is also much rarer that male cyberstalkers. The conviction was overturned in on appeal in 2009 however.
- In Florida, HB 479 was introduced in 2003 to ban cyberstalking. This was signed into law in October 2003.

==== Age, legal limitations ====
While some laws only address online harassment of children, there are laws that protect adult cyberstalking victims. While some sites specialize in laws that protect victims age 18 and under, current and pending cyberstalking-related United States federal and state laws offer help to victims of all ages.

Most stalking laws require that the perpetrator make a credible threat of violence against the victim; others include threats against the victim's immediate family; and still others require the alleged stalker's course of conduct constitute an implied threat. While some conduct involving annoying or menacing behavior might fall short of illegal stalking, such behavior may be a prelude to stalking and violence and should be treated seriously.

Online identity stealth blurs the line on infringement of the rights of would-be victims to identify their perpetrators. There is a longstanding debate on how internet use can be traced to ensure safety without infringing on protected civil liberties.

==== Specific cases ====
There have been a number of high-profile legal cases in the United States related to cyberstalking, many of which have involved the suicides of young students. In thousands of other cases, charges either were not brought for the cyber harassment or were unsuccessful in obtaining convictions. As in all legal instances, much depends on public sympathy towards the victim, the quality of legal representation and other factors that can greatly influence the outcome of the crime – even if it will be considered a crime.

In the case of a fourteen-year-old student in Michigan, for instance, she pressed charges against her alleged rapist, which resulted in her being cyberstalked and cyberbullied by fellow students. After her suicide in 2010 all charges were dropped against the man who allegedly raped her, on the basis that the only witness was dead. This is the despite the fact that statutory rape charges could have been pressed.

In another case of cyberstalking, college student Dharun Ravi secretly filmed his roommate's sexual liaison with another man, then posted it online. After the victim committed suicide, Ravi was convicted in of bias intimidation and invasion of privacy in New Jersey v. Dharun Ravi. In 2012 he was sentenced to 30 days in jail, more than $11,000 in restitution and three years of probation. The judge ruled that he believes Ravi acted out of "colossal insensitivity, not hatred."

=== Europe ===
- Poland – Stalking, including cyberstalking, was made a criminal offence under the Polish Criminal Code on 6 June 2011.
- Spain – In Spain, it is possible to provide information about cyber-crime in an anonymous way to four safety bodies: Grupo de Delitos Telemáticos of the Civil Guard (Spain) (in Spanish), Brigada de Investigación Tecnológica of the National Police Corps of Spain (in Spanish), Mossos d'Esquadra in Catalonia, and Ertzaintza in Euskadi. It is also possible to provide information to a non-governmental organization.
- United Kingdom – In the United Kingdom, the Protection from Harassment Act 1997 contains an offence of stalking covering cyber-stalking, which was introduced into the act through the Protection of Freedoms Act 2012.

== See also ==
- Computer crime
- Convention on cybercrime
- Cyberbullying
- Cyberspace
- Cyberterrorism
- DecorMyEyes
- Harassment by computer
- Hate group
- Internet fraud
- Online dating
- Online predator
- Stalking
- The Psycho Ex-Wife
- ToS violation
