= Sangonet =

SANGONeT is a South African organisation, whose acronym stands for The Southern African NGO Network.

It is a civil society organisation with a focus on ICT, which was founded in 1987, and has a history closely linked to the social and political changes experienced by South Africa during its transition to democracy.

In 2006, SANGONeT launched a new joint venture, called www.sangotech.org whose aim is to "meet and respond to the South African NGO sector's connectivity, hardware and e-business infrastructure requirements."

== Central Case Management System ==
The Central Case Management System (CCMS) is an open source software that was developed by SANGONeT for the paralegal sector in South Africa. Designed to allow multiple organisations and paralegal offices to access, input and modify a central database of case records, the CCMS is a web-based thin-client application that eliminates the need to install and maintain software at each office.
