= Institute for Global Communications =

The Institute for Global Communications or IGC Internet was founded in 1987 and is an institution that provided web hosting service to environmental, peace, and social justice organizations. IGC is a project of the Tides Center. During the very early days of the Internet, IGC was responsible for training thousands of small progressive groups as to how to use email, mailing lists, discussion groups, gopher sites, and later web sites and other web services to further their mission.

IGC formed an international link when it started working with GreenNet in the United Kingdom.

In 1990, in partnership with six international organizations, IGC co-founded the Association for Progressive Communications (APC).

At its peak in 1998, IGC had over 35 full-time staff members with offices in San Francisco, California, USA.

IGC is set to cease operations on 30 June 2027.
