= Timeline of the history of the internet =

Chronology of events in the history of the Internet

A timeline of the history of the Internet can stretch back as far as the 19th century, as early electrical telecommunications like the telegraph laid the conceptual groundwork for global networking. This timeline begins in 1960, and lists key events including the emergence of novel ideas, the first implementation of new technologies, and the introduction of new products and services that were significant at that point in time in the history of the Internet. These events led to the Internet as we know it today.

== Early research and development (1960-1981) ==
- 1960–1964: J. C. R. Licklider has ideas about human-computer interaction and networking; becomes the director of Project MAC work on time-sharing.
- 1960–1964: Distributed networking concepts for digital voice communication developed by Paul Baran at RAND.
- 1965–1967: Packet switching concepts for data communication in high-speed computer networks conceived by Donald Davies.
- 1967: ARPANET planning begins to enable resource sharing over a wide area network.
- 1967: Symposium on Operating Systems Principles in Gatlinburg, Tennessee.
- 1969: NPL network followed by the ARPANET carry their first packets.
- 1970: Network Information Center (NIC).
- 1971: Tymnet switched-circuit network.
- 1972: Merit Network, founded in 1966, begins operation of a packet-switched network.
- 1972: Internet Assigned Numbers Authority (IANA) established.
- 1973: CYCLADES network demonstrated by Louis Pouzin and Hubert Zimmerman.
- 1973: PARC Universal Packet development begins
- 1974: Transmission Control Program specification published
- 1975: Telenet commercial packet-switched network
- 1976: X.25 protocol, developed by Rémi Després and others, is approved by the CCITT and deployed on public data networks
- 1978: Minitel introduced
- 1979: Internet Activities Board (IAB)
- 1980: USENET news using UUCP
- 1980: Ethernet standard introduced
- 1981: BITNET established

== Merging the networks and creating the Internet (1981-1994) ==
- 1981: Computer Science Network (CSNET)
- 1982: TCP/IP protocol suite formalized
- 1982: Simple Mail Transfer Protocol (SMTP)
- 1983: Domain Name System (DNS)
- 1983: MILNET split off from ARPANET
- 1984: OSI Reference Model released.
- 1984: JANET network online.
- 1985: First .COM domain name registered
- 1986: NSFNET with 56 kbit/s links
- 1986: Internet Engineering Task Force (IETF)
- 1987: UUNET founded
- 1988: NSFNET upgraded to 1.5 Mbit/s (T1)
- 1988: Morris worm
- 1988: Complete Internet protocol suite
- 1989: Border Gateway Protocol (BGP)
- 1989: PSINet founded, allows commercial traffic
- 1989: Federal Internet Exchange (FIX)
- 1990: GOSIP (without TCP/IP)
- 1990: ARPANET decommissioned
- 1990: Advanced Network and Services (ANS)
- 1990: UUNET/Alternet allows commercial traffic
- 1990: Archie search engine
- 1991: Wide area information server (WAIS)
- 1991: Gopher
- 1991: Commercial Internet eXchange (CIX)
- 1991: ANS CO+RE allows commercial traffic
- 1991: World Wide Web (WWW)
- 1992: NSFNET upgraded to 45 Mbit/s (T3)
- 1992: Internet Society (ISOC) established
- 1993: Classless Inter-Domain Routing (CIDR)
- 1993: InterNIC established
- 1993: AOL added USENET access
- 1993: Mosaic web browser released
- 1994: Full text web search engines
- 1994: North American Network Operators' Group (NANOG) established

== Commercialization, privatization, broader access leads to the modern Internet (1995-present) ==
- 1995: New Internet architecture with commercial ISPs connected at NAPs
- 1995: NSFNET decommissioned
- 1995: GOSIP updated to allow TCP/IP
- 1995: very high-speed Backbone Network Service (vBNS)
- 1995: IPv6 proposed
- 1996: AOL changes pricing model from hourly to monthly
- 1998: Internet Corporation for Assigned Names and Numbers (ICANN)
- 1999: IEEE 802.11b wireless networking
- 1999: Internet2/Abilene Network
- 1999: vBNS+ allows broader access
- 2000: Dot-com bubble bursts
- 2001: New top-level domain names activated
- 2001: Code Red I, Code Red II, and Nimda worms
- 2003: UN World Summit on the Information Society (WSIS) phase I
- 2003: National LambdaRail founded
- 2004: UN Working Group on Internet Governance (WGIG)
- 2005: UN WSIS phase II
- 2006: First meeting of the Internet Governance Forum
- 2010: First internationalized country code top-level domains registered
- 2012: ICANN begins accepting applications for new generic top-level domain names
- 2013: Montevideo Statement on the Future of Internet Cooperation
- 2014: NetMundial international Internet governance proposal
- 2016: ICANN contract with U.S. Dept. of Commerce ends, IANA oversight passes to the global Internet community on October 1st
- 2018: The European Union's General Data Protection Regulation (GDPR) goes into effect, establishing stringent new global data privacy standards
- 2020: Global internet traffic experiences a massive surge due to the COVID-19 pandemic, heavily accelerating remote work and digital communication platforms

== Examples of Internet services ==
- 1989: AOL dial-up service provider, email, instant messaging, and web browser
- 1990: IMDb Internet movie database
- 1994: Yahoo! web directory
- 1995: Amazon online retailer
- 1995: eBay online auction and shopping
- 1995: Craigslist classified advertisements
- 1995: AltaVista search engine
- 1996: Outlook (formerly Hotmail) free web-based e-mail
- 1996: RankDex search engine
- 1997: Google Search
- 1997: Babel Fish automatic translation
- 1998: Yahoo Groups (formerly Yahoo! Clubs)
- 1998: PayPal Internet payment system
- 1998: Rotten Tomatoes review aggregator
- 1999: 2ch Anonymous textboard
- 1999: i-mode mobile internet service
- 1999: Napster peer-to-peer file sharing
- 2000: Baidu search engine
- 2001: 2chan Anonymous imageboard
- 2001: BitTorrent peer-to-peer file sharing
- 2001: Wikipedia, the free encyclopedia
- 2003: LinkedIn business networking
- 2003: Myspace social networking site
- 2003: Skype Internet voice calls
- 2003: iTunes Store
- 2003: 4chan Anonymous imageboard
- 2003: The Pirate Bay, torrent file host
- 2004: Facebook social networking site
- 2004: Podcast media file series
- 2004: Flickr image hosting
- 2005: YouTube video sharing
- 2005: Reddit link voting
- 2005: Google Earth virtual globe
- 2006: Twitter microblogging
- 2007: WikiLeaks anonymous news and information leaks
- 2007: Google Street View
- 2007: Kindle, e-reader and virtual bookshop
- 2008: Amazon Elastic Compute Cloud (EC2)
- 2008: Dropbox cloud-based file hosting
- 2008: Encyclopedia of Life, a collaborative encyclopedia intended to document all living species
- 2008: Spotify, a DRM-based music streaming service
- 2009: Bing search engine
- 2009: Google Docs, Web-based word processor, spreadsheet, presentation, form, and data storage service
- 2009: Kickstarter, a threshold pledge system
- 2009: Bitcoin, a digital currency
- 2010: Instagram, photo sharing and social networking
- 2011: Google+, social networking
- 2011: Snapchat, photo sharing
- 2012: Coursera, massive open online courses
- 2016: TikTok, video sharing and social networking
- 2020: Zoom experiences widespread global adoption during the COVID-19 pandemic
- 2022: ChatGPT, a conversational generative AI chatbot released by OpenAI

== See also ==
- Outline of the Internet
