= Doug Gale =

American computer scientist

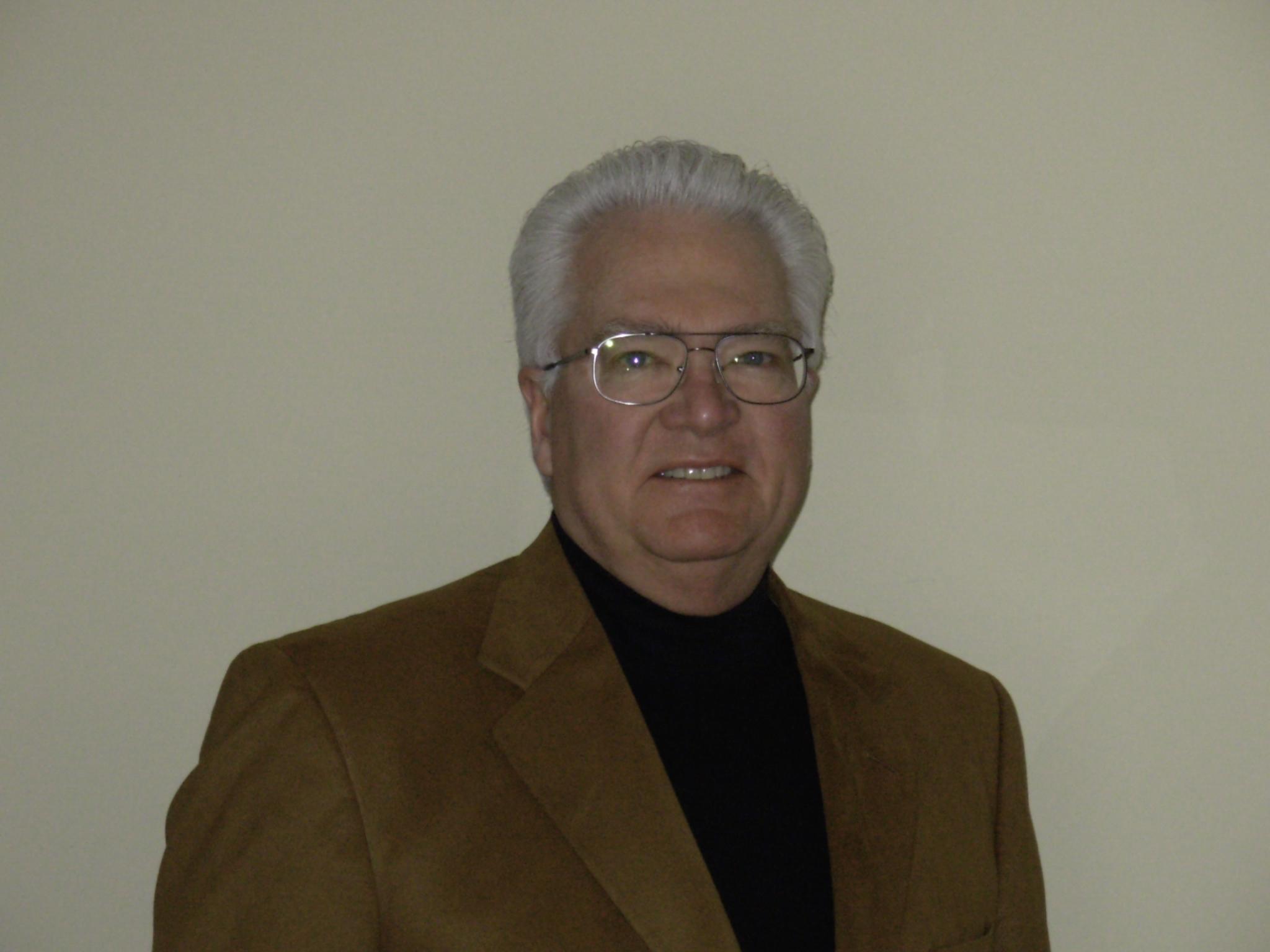
- Born: Douglas Shannon Gale; August 16, 1942
- Died: October 26, 2015 (aged 73)
- Citizenship: American
- Education: Kansas State University
- Known for: Internet2; OARnet; MIDnet
- Awards: Internet2 President’s Leadership Award (2016)
- Scientific career
- Fields: Telecommunications
- Workplaces: Cornell University, University of Nebraska–Lincoln, George Washington University, National Science Foundation

Doug Gale was an early developer of the Internet. Gale earned a Ph.D. in physics from Kansas State University in 1972, and served as a tenured associate professor of physics at East Texas State University for eight years, during which time his research interests shifted to computer science.

== Contributions to the Internet ==
Gale changed careers in 1980 to the management of information technology, serving as the Director of Decentralized Computing at Cornell University until 1984. Subsequently, he served as Chief Information Officer at the University of Nebraska–Lincoln and the George Washington University, and Director of OARnet, a regional Internet Service Provider. In 2003 he founded a consultancy Information Technology Associates, LLC.

In 1986 Gale founded MIDnet, one of the original mid-level networks on the NSFNET and the first to become fully operational. He later served as the Program Director of NSFNET for the National Science Foundation where he was responsible for adding colleges and universities to the fledgling network and upgrading the backbone to DS-3. In 1996 he prepared the white paper that led to the creation of Internet2.

Gale founded the Internet Legacy Institute, LLC in 2010 to preserve and archive information and original source materials about the creation and evolution of the Internet.

== Major awards ==
In 1991 he received the “Director’s Award for Program Officer Excellence” at the National Science Foundation for his contributions. In 2008 he received the Catalyst Award from Educause on behalf of the Regional Networks on the NSFNET. In 2016 he was awarded the Internet2 President's Leadership Award posthumously. His wife of 50 years, Henrietta, accepted the award with their sons Marc and Eric.
