= National Science Foundation Network =

American projects to promote computer research

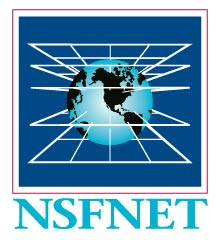
- NSFNET logo
- Type: Data
- Location: USA
- Protocols: TCP/IP and OSI
- Operator: Merit Network with IBM, MCI, the State of Michigan, and later ANS
- Established: 1985; 41 years ago
- Current status: Decommissioned April 30, 1995, superseded by the commercial Internet
- Commercial?: No
- Funding: National Science Foundation
- Website: NSFNET history

The National Science Foundation Network (NSFNET) was a program of coordinated, evolving projects sponsored by the National Science Foundation (NSF) from 1985 to 1995 to promote advanced research and education networking in the United States. The program created several nationwide backbone computer networks in support of these initiatives. It was created to link researchers to the NSF-funded supercomputing centers. Later, with additional public funding and also with private industry partnerships, the network developed into a major part of the Internet backbone.

The National Science Foundation permitted only government agencies and universities to use the network until 1989 when the first commercial Internet service provider emerged. By 1991, the NSF removed access restrictions and the commercial ISP business grew rapidly.

== History ==
Following the deployment of the Computer Science Network (CSNET), a network that provided Internet services to academic computer science departments, in 1981, the U.S. National Science Foundation (NSF) aimed to create an academic research network facilitating access by researchers to the supercomputing centers funded by NSF in the United States.

In 1985, NSF began funding the creation of five new supercomputing centers:

- John von Neumann Center at Princeton University
- Cornell Theory Center at Cornell University
- Pittsburgh Supercomputing Center (PSC), a joint effort of Carnegie Mellon University, the University of Pittsburgh, and Westinghouse
- National Center for Supercomputing Applications (NCSA) at the University of Illinois at Urbana–Champaign
- San Diego Supercomputer Center (SDSC) on the campus of the University of California, San Diego (UCSD)

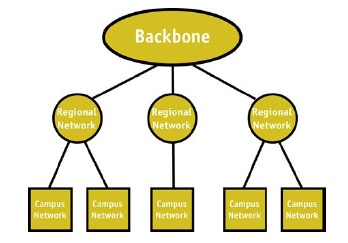
NSF's three-tiered network architecture

Also in 1985, under the leadership of Dennis Jennings, the NSF established the National Science Foundation Network (NSFNET). NSFNET was to be a general-purpose research network, a hub to connect the five supercomputing centers along with the NSF-funded National Center for Atmospheric Research (NCAR) to each other and to the regional research and education networks that would in turn connect campus networks. Using this three-tier network architecture NSFNET would provide access between the supercomputer centers and other sites over the backbone network at no cost to the centers or to the regional networks using the open TCP/IP protocols initially deployed successfully on the ARPANET.

=== 56 kbit/s backbone ===
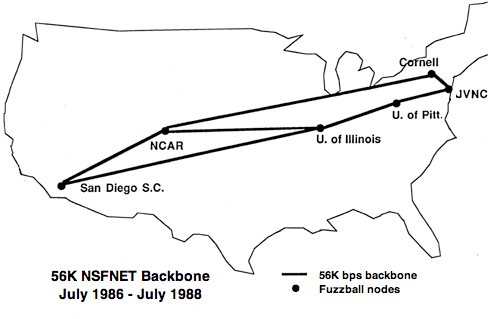
56K NSFNET Backbone, c. 1988

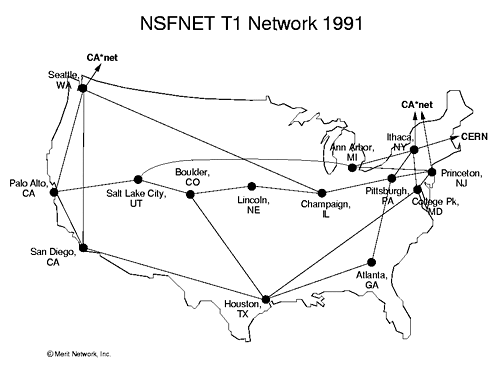
T1 NSFNET Backbone, c. 1991

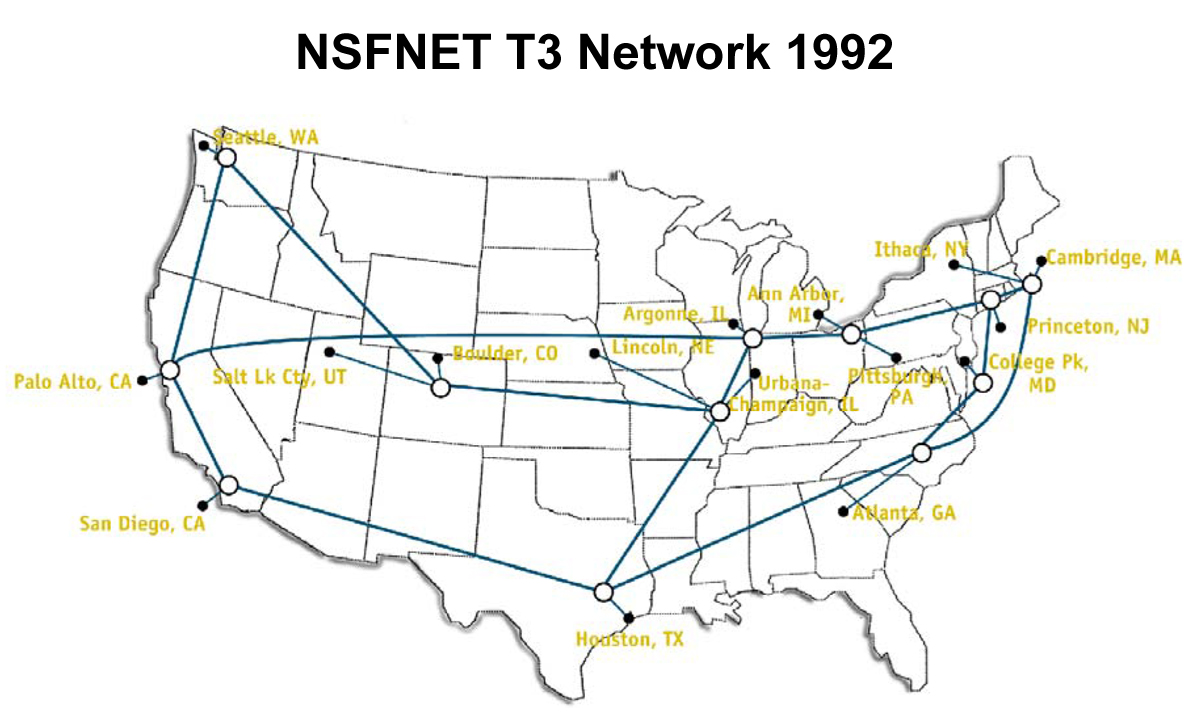
T3 NSFNET Backbone, c. 1992

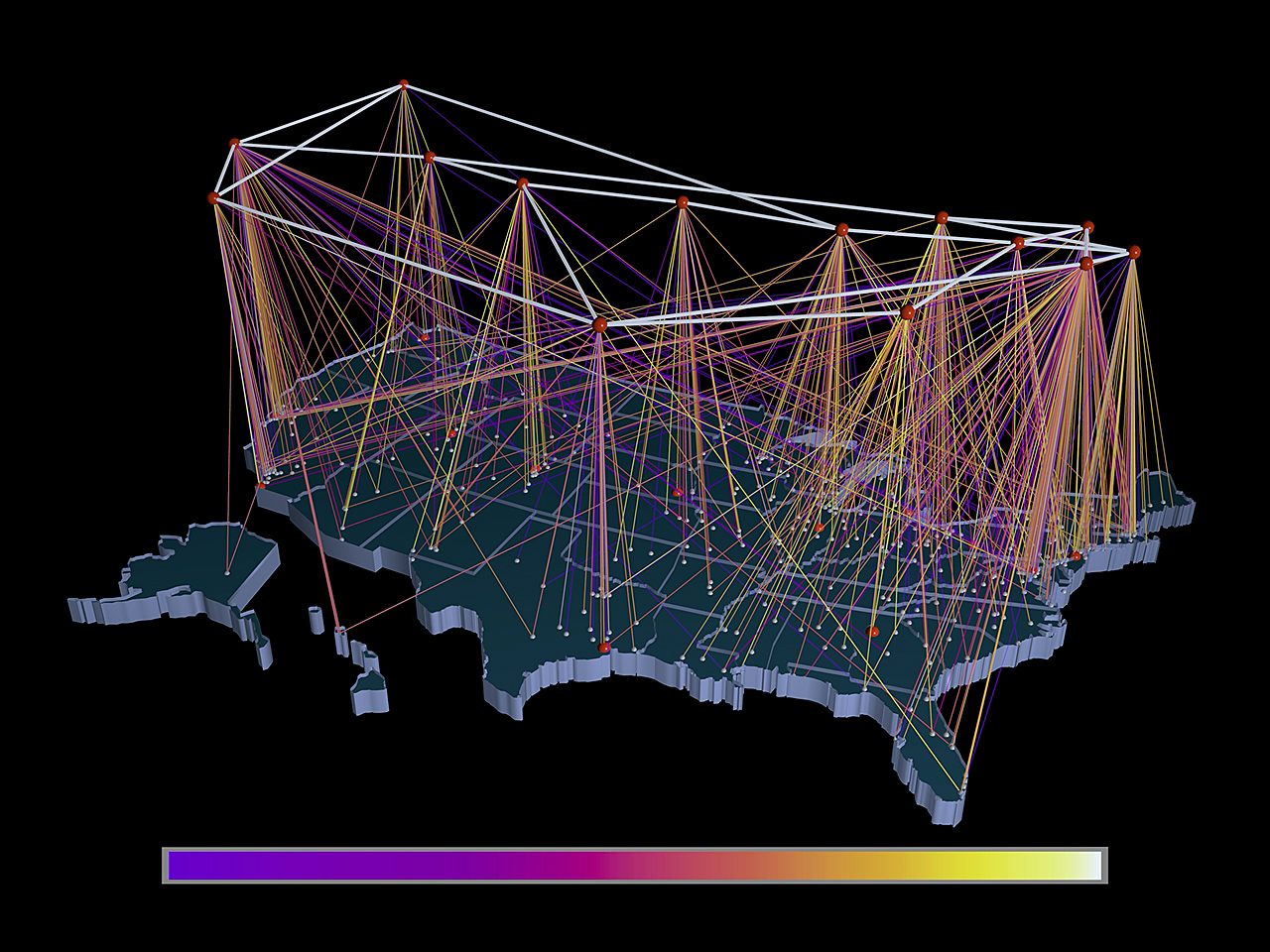
NSFNET Traffic 1991, NSFNET backbone nodes are shown at the top, regional networks below, traffic volume is depicted from purple (zero bytes) to white (100 billion bytes), visualization by NCSA using traffic data provided by the Merit Network.

The NSFNET initiated operations in 1986 using TCP/IP. Its six backbone sites were interconnected with leased 56-kbit/s links, built by a group including the University of Illinois National Center for Supercomputing Applications (NCSA), Cornell University Theory Center, University of Delaware, and Merit Network. PDP-11/73 minicomputers with routing and management software, called Fuzzballs, served as the network routers since they already implemented the TCP/IP standard.

This original 56 kbit/s backbone was overseen by the supercomputer centers themselves with the lead taken by Ed Krol at the University of Illinois at Urbana–Champaign. PDP-11/73 Fuzzball routers were configured and run by Hans-Werner Braun at the Merit Network and statistics were collected by Cornell University.

Support for NSFNET end-users was provided by the NSF Network Service Center (NNSC), located at BBN Technologies and included publishing the softbound "Internet Manager's Phonebook" which listed the contact information for every issued domain name and IP address in 1990. Incidentally, Ed Krol also authored the Hitchhiker's Guide to the Internet to help users of the NSFNET understand its capabilities. The Hitchhiker's Guide became one of the first help manuals for the Internet.

As regional networks grew the 56 kbit/s NSFNET backbone experienced rapid increases in network traffic and became seriously congested. In June 1987 NSF issued a new solicitation to upgrade and expand NSFNET.

=== 1.5 Mbit/s (T-1) backbone ===
IBM and MCI jointly won the NSF contract in November 1987, with a switching system from the former and digital network from the latter. That month, a report by the Federal Coordinating Council for Science, Engineering, and Technology Committee on Computer Research and Applications proposed that scientific computer networks should provide 1.5 Mbit/s connections between 200 and 300 American research institutions by 1990. As a result of the award to Merit Network, a networking consortium by public universities in Michigan, the original 56 kbit/s network was expanded to include 13 nodes interconnected at 1.5 Mbit/s (T-1) by July 1988. Additional links were added to form a multi-path network, and a node located in Atlanta was added. Each of the backbone nodes was a router called the Nodal Switching System (NSS). The NSSes were a collection of multiple (typically nine) IBM RT PC systems connected by a Token Ring local area network. The RT PCs ran AOS, IBM's version of Berkeley UNIX, and was dedicated to a particular packet processing task.

Under its cooperative agreement with NSF, Merit was the lead organization in a partnership that included IBM, MCI, and the State of Michigan. Merit provided overall project coordination, network design and engineering, a Network Operations Center (NOC), and information services to assist the regional networks. IBM provided equipment, software development, installation, maintenance and operations support. MCI provided the T-1 data circuits at reduced rates. The state of Michigan provided funding for facilities and personnel. Eric M. Aupperle, Merit's president, was the NSFNET project director, and Hans-Werner Braun was the co-principal investigator.

From 1987 to 1994, Merit organized a series of "Regional-Techs" meetings, where technical staff from the regional networks met to discuss operational issues of common concern with each other and the Merit engineering staff.

During this period, but separate from its support for the NSFNET backbone, NSF funded:

- the NSF Connections Program that helped colleges and universities obtain or upgrade connections to regional networks;
- regional networks to obtain or upgrade equipment and data communications circuits;
- the NNSC, and successor Network Information Services Manager (aka InterNIC) information help desks;
- the International Connections Manager (ICM), a task performed by Sprint, that encouraged connections between the NSFNET backbone and international research and education networks; and
- various ad hoc grants to organizations such as the Federation of American Research Networks (FARNET).

The NSFNET became the principal Internet backbone starting in the Summer of 1986, when MIDnet, the first NSFNET regional backbone network became operational. By 1988, in addition to the five NSF supercomputer centers, NSFNET included connectivity to the regional networks BARRNet, JVNCNet, Merit/MichNet, MIDnet, NCAR, NorthWestNet, NYSERNet, SESQUINET, SURAnet, and Westnet, which in turn connected about 170 additional networks to the NSFNET. Three new nodes were added as part of the upgrade to T-3: NEARNET in Cambridge, Massachusetts; Argone National Laboratory outside of Chicago; and SURAnet in Atlanta, Georgia. NSFNET connected to other federal government networks including the NASA Science Internet, the Energy Science Network (ESnet), and others.

Connections were also established to research and education networks in other countries starting in 1988 with Canada, France, NORDUnet (serving Denmark, Finland, Iceland, Norway, and Sweden), the Netherlands, and many other countries in subsequent years.

Two Federal Internet Exchanges (FIXes) were established in June 1989 under the auspices of the Federal Engineering Planning Group (FEPG). FIX East, at the University of Maryland in College Park and FIX West, at the NASA Ames Research Center in Mountain View, California. The existence of NSFNET and the FIXes allowed the ARPANET to be phased out in mid-1990.

Starting in August 1990 the NSFNET backbone supported the OSI Connectionless Network Protocol (CLNP) in addition to TCP/IP. However, CLNP usage remained low when compared to TCP/IP.

Traffic on the network continued its rapid growth, doubling every seven months. Projections indicated that the T-1 backbone would become overloaded sometime in 1990.

A critical routing technology, Border Gateway Protocol (BGP), originated during this period of Internet history. BGP allowed routers on the NSFNET backbone to differentiate routes originally learned via multiple paths. Prior to BGP, interconnection between IP network was inherently hierarchical, and careful planning was needed to avoid routing loops. BGP turned the Internet into a meshed topology, moving away from the centric architecture which the ARPANET emphasized.

=== 45 Mbit/s (T-3) backbone ===
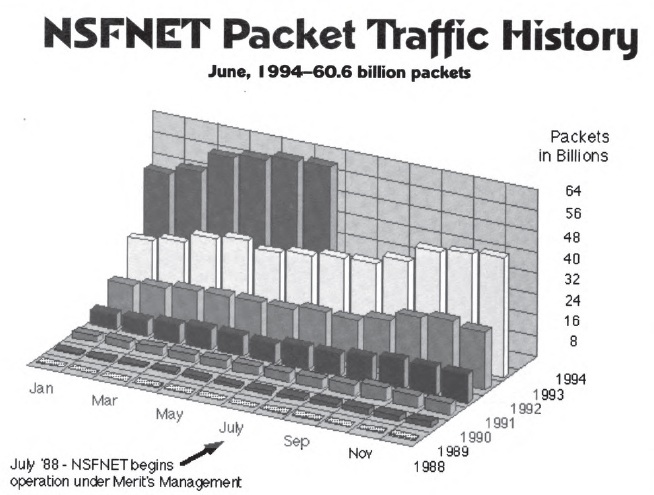
Packet Traffic on the NSFNET Backbone, January 1988 to June 1994

The November 1987 report proposed a national research network with 45 Mbit/s connections between 1000 sites by the early 1990s, and deployment of 3 Gbit/s connections within 15 years. During 1991, an upgraded backbone built with 45 Mbit/s (T-3) transmission circuits was deployed to interconnect 16 nodes. The routers on the upgraded backbone were IBM RS/6000 servers running AIX UNIX. Core nodes were located at MCI facilities with end nodes at the connected regional networks and supercomputing centers. Completed in November 1991, the transition from T-1 to T-3 did not go as smoothly as the previous transition from 56 kbit/s DDS to 1.5 mbit/s T-1, as it took longer than planned. As a result, there was at times serious congestion on the overloaded T-1 backbone. Following the transition to T-3, portions of the T-1 backbone were left in place to act as a backup for the new T-3 backbone.

In anticipation of the T-3 upgrade and the approaching end of the 5-year NSFNET cooperative agreement, in September 1990 Merit, IBM, and MCI formed Advanced Network and Services (ANS), a new non-profit corporation with a more broadly based Board of Directors than the Michigan-based Merit Network. Under its cooperative agreement with NSF, Merit remained ultimately responsible for the operation of NSFNET, but subcontracted much of the engineering and operations work to ANS. Both IBM and MCI made substantial new financial and other commitments to help support the new venture. Allan Weis left IBM to become ANS's first president and managing director. Douglas Van Houweling, former Chair of the Merit Network Board and Vice Provost for Information Technology at the University of Michigan, was Chairman of the ANS Board of Directors.

The new T-3 backbone was named ANSNet and provided the physical infrastructure used by Merit to deliver the NSFNET Backbone Service.

== Regional networks ==
In addition to the five NSF supercomputer centers (which operated regional networks, e.g., SDSCnet and NCSAnet), NSFNET provided connectivity to eleven regional networks and through these networks to many smaller regional and campus networks. The NSFNET regional networks were:

- BARRNet, the Bay Area Regional Research Network in Palo Alto, California;
- CERFnet, California Education and Research Federation Network in San Diego, California, serving California and Nevada;
- CICNet, the Committee on Institutional Cooperation Network via the Merit Network in Ann Arbor, Michigan and later as part of the T-3 upgrade via Argonne National Laboratory outside of Chicago, serving the Big Ten Universities and the University of Chicago in Illinois, Indiana, Iowa, Michigan, Minnesota, Ohio, and Wisconsin;
- JVNCNet, the John von Neumann National Supercomputer Center Network in Princeton, New Jersey, connected the universities that made up the Consortium for Scientific Computing as well as a few New Jersey Universities. There were 1.5 Mbit/s (T-1) links to Princeton University, Rutgers University, Massachusetts Institute of Technology, Harvard University, Brown University, University of Pennsylvania, University of Pittsburgh, Yale University, The Institute for Advanced Study, Pennsylvania State University, Rochester Institute of Technology, New York University, The University of Colorado and The University of Arizona.
- Merit/MichNet in Ann Arbor, Michigan serving Michigan, formed in 1966, still in operation as of 2013;
- MIDnet in Lincoln, Nebraska the first NSFNET regional backbone to become operational in the Summer of 1986, serving Arkansas, Iowa, Kansas, Missouri, Nebraska, Oklahoma, and South Dakota, later acquired by Global Internet, which was acquired by Verio, Inc.;
- NEARNET, the New England Academic and Research Network in Cambridge, Massachusetts, added as part of the upgrade to T-3, serving Connecticut, Maine, Massachusetts, New Hampshire, Rhode Island, and Vermont, established in late 1988, operated by BBN under contract to MIT, BBN assumed responsibility for NEARNET on 1 July 1993;
- NorthWestNet in Seattle, Washington, serving Alaska, Idaho, Montana, North Dakota, Oregon, and Washington, founded in 1987; Currently being used by Ziply Fiber
- NYSERNet, New York State Education and Research Network in Ithaca, New York;
- SESQUINET, the Sesquicentennial Network in Houston, Texas, founded during the 150th anniversary of the State of Texas;
- SURAnet, the Southeastern Universities Research Association network in College Park, Maryland and later as part of the T-3 upgrade in Atlanta, Georgia serving Alabama, Florida, Georgia, Kentucky, Louisiana, Maryland, Mississippi, North Carolina, South Carolina, Tennessee, Virginia, and West Virginia, sold to BBN in 1994; and
- Westnet in Salt Lake City, Utah and Boulder, Colorado, serving Arizona, Colorado, New Mexico, Utah, and Wyoming.

== Commercial traffic ==
The NSF's appropriations act authorized NSF to "foster and support the development and use of computer and other scientific and engineering methods and technologies, primarily for research and education in the sciences and engineering." This allowed NSF to support NSFNET and related networking initiatives, but only to the extent that that support was "primarily for research and education in the sciences and engineering." And this in turn was taken to mean that use of NSFNET for commercial purposes was not allowed.

=== Acceptable use policy ===
To ensure that NSF support was used appropriately, NSF developed the NSFNET Acceptable Use Policy (AUP) that outlined in broad terms the uses of NSFNET that were and were not allowed. The AUP was revised several times to make it clearer and to allow the broadest possible use of NSFNET, consistent with Congress' wishes as expressed in the authorization act.

A notable feature of the AUP is that it cites acceptable uses of the network that are not directly related to who or what type of organization is making that use. Use from for-profit organizations is acceptable when it is in support of open research and education. Additionally, some uses, such as fundraising, advertising, public relations activities, extensive personal or private use, for-profit consulting, and all illegal activities were never acceptable, even when that use is by a non-profit college, university, K-12 school, or library. While these AUP provisions seem reasonable, in some specific cases, they often proved difficult to interpret and enforce. NSF did not monitor the content of traffic that was sent over NSFNET or actively police the use of the network. Further, NSF did not require Merit or the regional networks to do so. NSF, Merit, and the regional networks did investigate possible cases of inappropriate use, when such use was brought to their attention.

An example may help to illustrate the problem. Is it acceptable for a parent to exchange e-mail with a child enrolled at a college or university, if that exchange uses the NSFNET backbone? It would be acceptable, if the subject of the e-mail was the student's instruction or a research project. Even if the subject was not instruction or research, the e-mail still might be acceptable as private or personal business as long as the use was not extensive.

The prohibition on commercial use of the NSFNET backbone meant that some organizations could not connect to the Internet via regional networks that were connected to the NSFNET backbone, while to be fully connected other organizations (or regional networks on their behalf), including some non-profit research and educational institutions, would need to obtain two connections, one to an NSFNET attached regional network and one to a non-NSFNET attached network provider. In either case the situation was confusing and inefficient. It prevented economies of scale, increased costs, or both. And this slowed the growth of the Internet and its adoption by new classes of users, something no one was happy about.

In 1988, Vint Cerf, then at the Corporation for National Research Initiatives (CNRI), proposed to the Federal Networking Council (FNC) and to MCI to interconnect the commercial MCI Mail system to NSFNET. MCI provided funding and FNC provided permission and in the summer of 1989, this linkage was made. In effect, the FNC permitted experimental use of the NSFNET backbone to carry commercial email traffic into and out of the NSFNET. Other email providers such as Telenet's Telemail, Tymnet's OnTyme and CompuServe also obtained permission to establish experimental gateways for the same purpose at about the same time. The interesting side effect of these links to NSFNET was that the users of the heretofore disconnected commercial email services were able to exchange email with one another via the Internet. Coincidentally, three commercial Internet service providers emerged in the same general time period: AlterNet (built by UUNET), PSINet and CERFnet.

=== Commercial ISPs, ANS CO+RE, and the CIX ===
During the period when NSFNET was being established, Internet service providers that allowed commercial traffic began to emerge, such as Alternet, PSINet, CERFNet, and others. The commercial networks in many cases were interconnected to the NSFNET and routed traffic over the NSFNET nominally accordingly to the NSFNET acceptable use policy. Additionally, these early commercial networks often directly interconnected with each other as well as, on a limited basis, with some of the regional Internet networks.

In 1991, the Commercial Internet eXchange (CIX, pronounced "kicks") was created by PSINet, UUNET and CERFnet to provide a location at which multiple networks could exchange traffic free from traffic-based settlements and restrictions imposed by an acceptable use policy.

In 1991, a new ISP, ANS CO+RE (commercial plus research), raised concerns and unique questions regarding commercial and non-commercial interoperability policies. ANS CO+RE was the for-profit subsidiary of the non-profit Advanced Network and Services (ANS) that had been created earlier by the NSFNET partners, Merit, IBM, and MCI. ANS CO+RE was created specifically to allow commercial traffic on ANSNet without jeopardizing its parent's non-profit status or violating any tax laws. The NSFNET Backbone Service and ANS CO+RE both used and shared the common ANSNet infrastructure. NSF agreed to allow ANS CO+RE to carry commercial traffic subject to several conditions:

- that the NSFNET Backbone Service was not diminished;
- that ANS CO+RE recovered at least the average cost of the commercial traffic traversing the network; and
- that any excess revenues recovered above the cost of carrying the commercial traffic would be placed into an infrastructure pool to be distributed by an allocation committee broadly representative of the networking community to enhance and extend national and regional networking infrastructure and support.

For a time ANS CO+RE refused to connect to the CIX and the CIX refused to purchase a connection to ANS CO+RE. In May 1992 Mitch Kapor and Al Weis forged an agreement where ANS would connect to the CIX as a "trial" with the ability to disconnect at a moment's notice and without the need to join the CIX as a member. This compromise resolved things for a time, but later the CIX started to block access from regional networks that had not paid the $10,000 fee to become members of the CIX.

Meanwhile, Congress passed its Scientific and Advanced-Technology Act of 1992 that formally permitted NSF to connect to commercial networks in support of research and education.

=== An unfortunate state of affairs ===
The creation of ANS CO+RE and its initial refusal to connect to the CIX was one of the factors that lead to the controversy described later in this article. Other issues had to do with:

- differences in the cultures of the non-profit research and education community and the for-profit community with ANS trying to be a member of both camps and not being fully accepted by either;
- differences of opinion about the best approach to take to open the Internet to commercial use and to maintain and encourage a fully interconnected Internet; and
- differences of opinion about the correct type and level of involvement in Internet networking initiatives by the public and the private sectors.

For a time this state of affairs kept the networking community as a whole from fully implementing the vision for the Internet as a worldwide network of fully interconnected TCP/IP networks allowing any connected site to communicate with any other connected site. These issues would not be fully resolved until a new network architecture was developed and the NSFNET Backbone Service was turned off in 1995.

== Privatization and a new network architecture ==
The NSFNET Backbone Service was primarily used by academic and educational entities, and was a transitional network bridging the era of the ARPANET and CSNET into the modern Internet of today. With its success, the "federally-funded backbone" model gave way to a vision of commercially operated networks operating together to which the users purchased access.

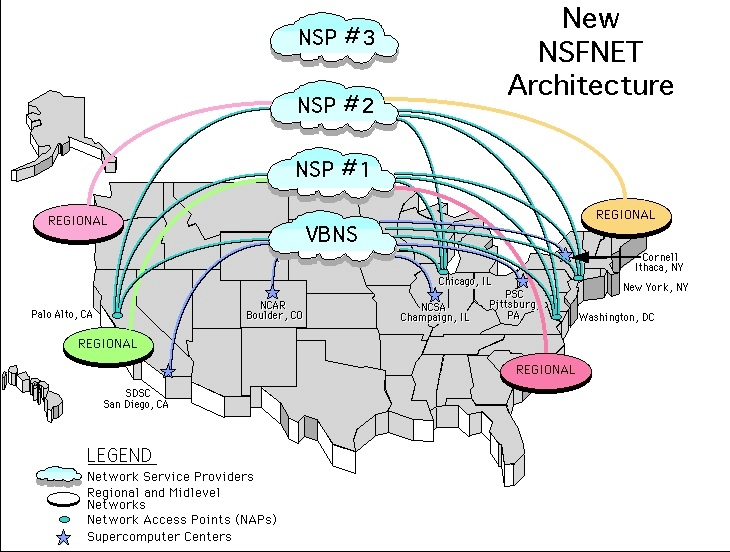
New network architecture, c. 1995

On April 30, 1995, the NSFNET Backbone Service had been successfully transitioned to a new architecture and the NSFNET fiber optic backbone was decommissioned. At this point the NSFNET regional backbone networks were still central to the infrastructure of the expanding Internet, and there were still other NSFNET programs, but there was no longer a central NSFNET optical networking service.

After the transition, network traffic was carried on the NSFNET fiber optic regional backbone networks and any of several commercial backbone networks, internetMCI, PSINet, SprintLink, ANSNet, and others. Traffic between networks was exchanged at four Network Access Points or NAPs. Competitively established, and initially funded by NSF, the NAPs were located in New York (actually New Jersey), Washington, D.C., Chicago, and San Jose and run by Sprint, MFS Datanet, Ameritech, and Pacific Bell. The NAPs were the forerunners of modern Internet exchange points.

The NSFNET regional backbone networks could connect to any of their newer peer commercial backbone networks or directly to the NAPs, but in either case they would need to pay for their own connection infrastructure. NSF provided some funding for the NAPs and interim funding to help the regional networks make the transition, but did not fund the new commercial backbone networks directly.

To help ensure the stability of the Internet during and immediately after the transition from NSFNET, NSF conducted a solicitation to select a Routing Arbiter (RA) and ultimately made a joint award to the Merit Network and USC's Information Science Institute to act as the RA.

To continue its promotion of advanced networking technology the NSF conducted a solicitation to create a very high-speed Backbone Network Service (vBNS) which, like NSFNET before it, would focus on providing service to the research and education community. MCI won this award and created a 155 Mbit/s (OC3c) and later a 622 Mbit/s (OC12c) and 2.5 Gbit/s (OC48c) ATM network to carry TCP/IP traffic primarily between the supercomputing centers and their users. NSF support was available to organizations that could demonstrate a need for very high speed networking capabilities and wished to connect to the vBNS or to the Abilene Network, the high speed network operated by the University Corporation for Advanced Internet Development (UCAID, aka Internet2).

At the February 1994 regional techs meeting in San Diego, the group revised its charter to include a broader base of network service providers, and subsequently adopted North American Network Operators' Group (NANOG) as its new name. Elise Gerich and Mark Knopper were the founders of NANOG and its first coordinators, followed by Bill Norton, Craig Labovitz, and Susan Harris.

== Controversy ==
For much of the period from 1987 to 1995, following the opening up of the Internet through NSFNET and in particular after the creation of the for-profit ANS CO+RE in May 1991, some Internet stakeholders were concerned over the effects of privatization and the manner in which ANS, IBM, and MCI received a perceived competitive advantage in leveraging federal research money to gain ground in fields in which other companies allegedly were more competitive. The Cook Report on the Internet, which still exists, evolved as one of its largest critics. Other writers, such as Chetly Zarko, a University of Michigan alumnus and freelance investigative writer, offered their own critiques.

On March 12, 1992, the Subcommittee on Science of the Committee on Science, Space, and Technology, U.S. House of Representatives, held a hearing to review the management of NSFNET. Witnesses at the hearing were asked to focus on the agreement(s) that NSF put in place for the operation of the NSFNET backbone, the foundation's plan for recompetition of those agreements, and to help the subcommittee explore whether the NSF's policies provided a level playing field for network service providers, ensured that the network was responsive to user needs, and provided for effective network management. The subcommittee heard from seven witnesses, asked them a number of questions, and received written statements from all seven as well as from three others. At the end of the hearing, speaking to the two witnesses from NSF, Dr. Nico Habermann, Assistant NSF Director for the Computer and Information Science and Engineering Directorate (CISE), and Dr. Stephen Wolff, Director of NSF's Division of Networking & Communications Research & Infrastructure (DNCRI), Representative Boucher, chairman of the subcommittee, said:

… I think you should be very proud of what you have accomplished. Even those who have some constructive criticism of the way that the network is presently managed acknowledge at the outset that you have done a terrific job in accomplishing the goal of this NSFNET, and its user-ship is enormously up, its cost to the users has come down, and you certainly have our congratulations for that excellent success.

Subsequently, the subcommittee drafted legislation, becoming law on October 23, 1992, which authorized the National Science Foundation

… to foster and support access by the research and education communities to computer networks which may be used substantially for purposes in addition to research and education in the sciences and engineering, if the additional uses will tend to increase the overall capabilities of the networks to support such research and education activities (that is to say, commercial traffic).

This legislation allowed, but did not require, NSF to repeal or modify its existing NSFNET Acceptable Use Policy (AUP) which restricted network use to activities in support of research and education.

The hearing also led to a request from Rep. Boucher asking the NSF Inspector General to conduct a review of NSF's administration of NSFNET. The NSF Office of the Inspector General released its report on March 23, 1993. The report concluded by:

- stating that "[i]n general we were favorably impressed with the NSFNET program and staff";
- finding no serious problems with the administration, management, and use of the NSFNET Backbone Service;
- complimenting the NSFNET partners, saying that "the exchange of views among NSF, the NSFNET provider (Merit/ANS), and the users of NSFNET [via a bulletin board system], is truly remarkable in a program of the federal government"; and
- making 17 "recommendations to correct certain deficiencies and strengthen the upcoming re-solicitation."

== See also ==
- History of the Internet
- Merit Network
