= Farooq Hussain =

American author of the history of science

Farooq Hussain (born April 22, 1948) is an American author writing on the history of science and the impact of discoveries and technological innovation on society. He was born in Hyderabad, India, raised in the United Kingdom, and educated in England and the United States. He lives in Maryland near Washington, D.C. He is best known to historians of molecular biology for his 1977 reconstruction of the original Watson–Crick DNA double helix model, assembled from original components discovered at the University of Bristol. The reconstructed model is on permanent display at the Science Museum, London.

== Early career ==
Hussain's training in three-dimensional model construction began in the 1960s as a research assistant to Keith Critchlow at the Architectural Association in London, working in the Buckminster Fuller geometric tradition. He guest-edited the "Inner Space" special issue of Architectural Design (July 1969) on underwater habitats, and his book Living Underwater was published by Praeger in New York and Studio Vista in London in 1970. He subsequently joined the Biophysics Department at King's College London, led by Maurice Wilkins, and where Rosalind Franklin had worked, where his research included work on cetacean echolocation and communication alongside the construction of molecular models, most notably of turnip yellow mosaic virus for Aaron Klug. The turnip yellow virus posed a substantially different model-building problem from the helical tobacco mosaic virus, requiring representation of how protein subunits could bond to form an icosahedral capsid shell. During this period he published "Linus Pauling and the Alpha-Helix" in Trends in Biochemical Sciences.

== International security studies ==
Hussain later moved to the Department of War Studies, also at King's, where he completed his doctorate under the supervision of Sir Laurence Martin. He joined the International Institute for Strategic Studies (IISS) in London as a Research Associate from 1978 to 1979, where he authored what was published in 1981 as The Impact of Weapons Test Restrictions, Part IV of the institute's Future of Arms Control series (Adelphi Paper No. 165). A Ford Foundation Fellowship subsequently took him to the United States, where he was a fellow in Stanford University's Arms Control and Disarmament Program working with Sidney Drell, and at Harvard's Center for Science and International Affairs (later the Belfer Center for Science and International Affairs), then directed by Paul Doty, on nuclear arms control and verification questions. During this period, he co-authored, with Coit Dennis Blacker, the October 1980 Bulletin of the Atomic Scientists cover article "European Theater Nuclear Forces."

Hussain returned to Europe to serve as a member of the senior scientific staff at the SHAPE Technical Centre in The Hague, an analytical body of NATO, where he authored the professional paper Re-Thinking the Arms Race (1982). He subsequently served as Director of Studies at the Royal United Services Institute (RUSI) in London, where his published work included a co-authored article on the future of the military helicopter in the RUSI Journal and a contribution to the Brassey's/RUSI Defence Yearbook on the strategic implications of emerging technologies. He later joined a consulting partnership undertaking work for the European Union before relocating to the United States.

== Transition to industry ==
Hussain joined Sprint in the establishment of its commercial Internet services, serving as a National Science Foundation Principal Investigator under NSF Solicitation 93–52 for the Sprint-operated Network Access Point at Pennsauken, New Jersey, one of four NAPs awarded in February 1994 that together replaced the single NSFNET backbone with the distributed commercial architecture that became the modern Internet. He subsequently joined MCI under Vint Cerf, continuing work on the international interconnection of national networks. In December 2001, he presented at an OECD workshop in Paris on the impact of IP technology on traditional telephony carriers. After MCI, he worked with several startup ventures before retiring from industry.

== Writing and current work ==
Hussain publishes Ariadne's Dispatches on Substack and hosts the Icarus podcast, with editorial focus on the history of molecular biology, nuclear arms control and verification, and science and environmental policy. He is the author of The Last Treaty, published independently in 2026. He was a regular contributor to New Scientist earlier in his career, including cover articles; his 1977 investigative article "The Linus Pauling Institute: An Investigation" drew a published response from Linus Pauling and was cited by Bernard Dixon in the magazine's later review of Anthony Serafini's Pauling biography.

== Selected works ==
- Guest editor, "Inner Space," special issue of Architectural Design, July 1969
- Living Underwater. New York: Praeger, 1970; London: Studio Vista, 1970
- "Linus Pauling and the Alpha-Helix," Trends in Biochemical Sciences, February 1976
- "The Linus Pauling Institute: An Investigation," New Scientist, 28 July 1977, pp. 216–220
- "European Theater Nuclear Forces" (with Coit D. Blacker), Bulletin of the Atomic Scientists, October 1980
- The Future of Arms Control: Part IV, The Impact of Weapons Test Restrictions, Adelphi Paper No. 165 (IISS, Spring 1981)
- Re-Thinking the Arms Race, SHAPE Technical Centre Professional Paper PP-200 (1982)
- "The Future of the Military Helicopter" (with Ian Kemp and Philip McCarty), RUSI Journal, September 1985
- "The Military and Economic Implications of Emerging Technologies," Brassey's/RUSI Defence Yearbook 1985
- "Trends in Internet Protocol Technology: Their Impact on the Traditional Telephony Carrier World," OECD, Paris (December 2001)
- The Last Treaty (2026)

== See also ==
- Commercial Internet eXchange
- Rosalind Franklin
