= Commercial Internet eXchange =

Former internet exchange point

The Commercial Internet eXchange (CIX) was an early interexchange point that allowed the free exchange of TCP/IP traffic, including commercial traffic, between Internet service providers (ISPs). It was an important initial effort toward creating the commercial Internet that we know today.

== Goal ==
The goal of the CIX was to be an independent interconnection point with no U.S. government-defined "acceptable use policy" on the traffic that could be exchanged; and just as critical, a "no-settlement" policy between the parties exchanging traffic. The no-settlement policy became a "given" during the modern era of the Internet, but was immensely controversial at the time.

== The great debate ==
The early history of the Internet was dominated by U.S. government agencies such as ARPA/DARPA through ARPANET, the Defense Communications Agency (DCA) through MILNET, the National Science Foundation (NSF) through CSNET and NSFNET, the NSF sponsored regional research and education networks, and a handful of national networks sponsored by various federal government agencies. The focus of this group was either military/government or research and education communications, especially support for the separately funded NSF supercomputing initiatives that started after Nobel Prize laureate Ken Wilson's testimony to Congress in the 1980s.

In general these federally supported networks did not allow commercial traffic that was not in direct support of a federal agency's mission or in support of research and education. There were of course many organizations that wanted access to the Internet, but did not do work directly for or with federal agency or in support of research and education.

In 1988, the Federal Networking Council allowed the Corporation for National Research Initiatives CNRI to develop a gateway between the commercial MCI Mail. It became operational in 1989. That same year, many other commercial e-mail providers got permission to build and operate similar connections, leading to the interconnection of many, heretofore disconnected e-mail services to become linked via the Internet.

In 1991 the NSF allowed Advanced Network and Services (ANS), a non-profit company established by the Merit Network, IBM, and MCI to carry commercial traffic over the ANSNet backbone, the same infrastructure that carried traffic for the NSFNET Backbone Service. NSF required ANS to (i) charge at least the average cost of carrying the commercial traffic, (ii) to set aside any revenue in excess of the cost of carrying the commercial traffic in an infrastructure pool that would be allocated to enhance and extend national and regional networking infrastructure and support, and (iii) to ensure that carrying commercial traffic did not diminish the NSFNET service.

Some saw allowing ANS CO+RE to carry commercial traffic as a good next step in the evolution of the Internet and as a way to bring about economies of scale that would reduce the cost of the Internet for everyone. Others were concerned by this approach to commercialization/privatization of the Internet and the manner in which ANS, IBM, and MCI received a perceived competitive advantage in leveraging federal research money to gain ground in fields in which other companies allegedly were more competitive. There was also disagreement about a settlement policy that seemed to require payments based on the amount of traffic exchanged.

The "com-priv" public mailing list at PSInet (com-priv@psi.com) was created to provide an open forum where the positives and negatives of approaches toward the commercialization of the Internet could be debated. The concept for the CIX was disclosed and debated on the com-priv list.

== The CIX is born ==
In mid-1991, meetings that led to the formation of the CIX were held in Reston, Virginia. The original signatories to the CIX agreement were PSINet, UUNET, and CERFnet.

While testing was originally done in the Washington, DC area, commercial operations began at a PSInet facility in Santa Clara, California in the Fall of 1991. In April 1996, the CIX router moved to a more neutral site in Palo Alto, California, the Palo Alto Internet eXchange.

== The great compromise ==
The CIX was growing as more and more commercial ISPs connected. NSFNET traffic continued growing based on research and education usage. ANS CO+RE was carrying commercial traffic. But ANS refused to connect to the CIX and the CIX refused to purchase a connection to ANS. Thus it was not always possible for organizations connected to one provider to exchange traffic with other organizations connected via a different provider.

A "compromise" was needed in order to maintain a fully interconnected Internet. Mitch Kapor took over the CIX chairmanship from Marty Schoffstall and in June 1992 forged an agreement with ANS allowing ANS to connect to the CIX as a "trial" that they could leave with a moment's notice and without having to become a CIX member. This compromise resolved things for a time, but later the CIX started to block access from regional networks that had not paid the $10,000 fee to become members of the CIX.

This unfortunate state of affairs kept the networking community as a whole from fully implementing the true vision for the Internet—a worldwide network of fully interconnected TCP/IP networks allowing any connected site to communicate with any other connected site. These problems would not be fully resolved until a new network architecture was developed and the NSFNET Backbone Service was turned off in 1995.

== Legacy of the CIX as an exchange point ==
The CIX established the business model for the settlement-free exchange of Internet traffic between Network Service Providers. From an engineering perspective this was an important precursor to the Internet interconnection architecture that followed such as the Metropolitan Area Ethernet (MAE) and the NSF sponsored Network Access Points (NAPs) that were established for the transition of NSFNET traffic to competing service providers that included Sprint, ANS, internetMCI, and others.

By 1995 the CIX was essentially superseded by events both commercial and technical, though the CIX router continued to operate until 2001 when the UUNET peering session was turned down.

The hardware, a Cisco 7500 router, that had been the workhorse for most of the CIX's operational life (though not at its inception), together with papers and notes from the founding meetings (donated by Bill Schrader of PSINET) were acquired by the National Museum of American History in November 2005.

== The CIX as a trade association ==
As the role of CIX as an interexchange point diminished, it took on the role of an ISP trade association. CIX frequently lobbied the U.S. government and the Federal Communications Commission (FCC). CIX's executive director was Barbara Dooley. CIX's lobbying efforts reflected the positions of its largest financial supporter, AT&T, regularly opposing the positions of the incumbent local bell operating companies. CIX also appeared in other forums such as before the Federal Trade Commission (FTC) and Internet Corporation for Assigned Names and Numbers (ICANN). AT&T also supported a CIX spin off effort, the US ISP Association (USISPA) which was led by Sue Ashdown. Unlike other trade associations, CIX did not host a trade show, but instead appeared and solicited support at conferences like ISPCON.

AT&T, the long-distance company, came under financial strain during the dot-com bust prior to being acquired by SBC, and its support for CIX diminished. In 2002, CIX was reorganized and took on the name of its spin off organization, the USISPA. AT&T is now owned by SBC. While AT&T continues to support USIPSA, USISPA no longer takes policy stances at the FCC in opposition to SBC or other bell operating companies.

== See also ==
- National Science Foundation Network §§ Commercial traffic and Controversy
- Network Access Point (NAP)
- Federal Internet Exchange (FIX)
- Internet Exchange Point (IXP)
- History of the Internet
