= Stephen Wolff =

Internet pioneer

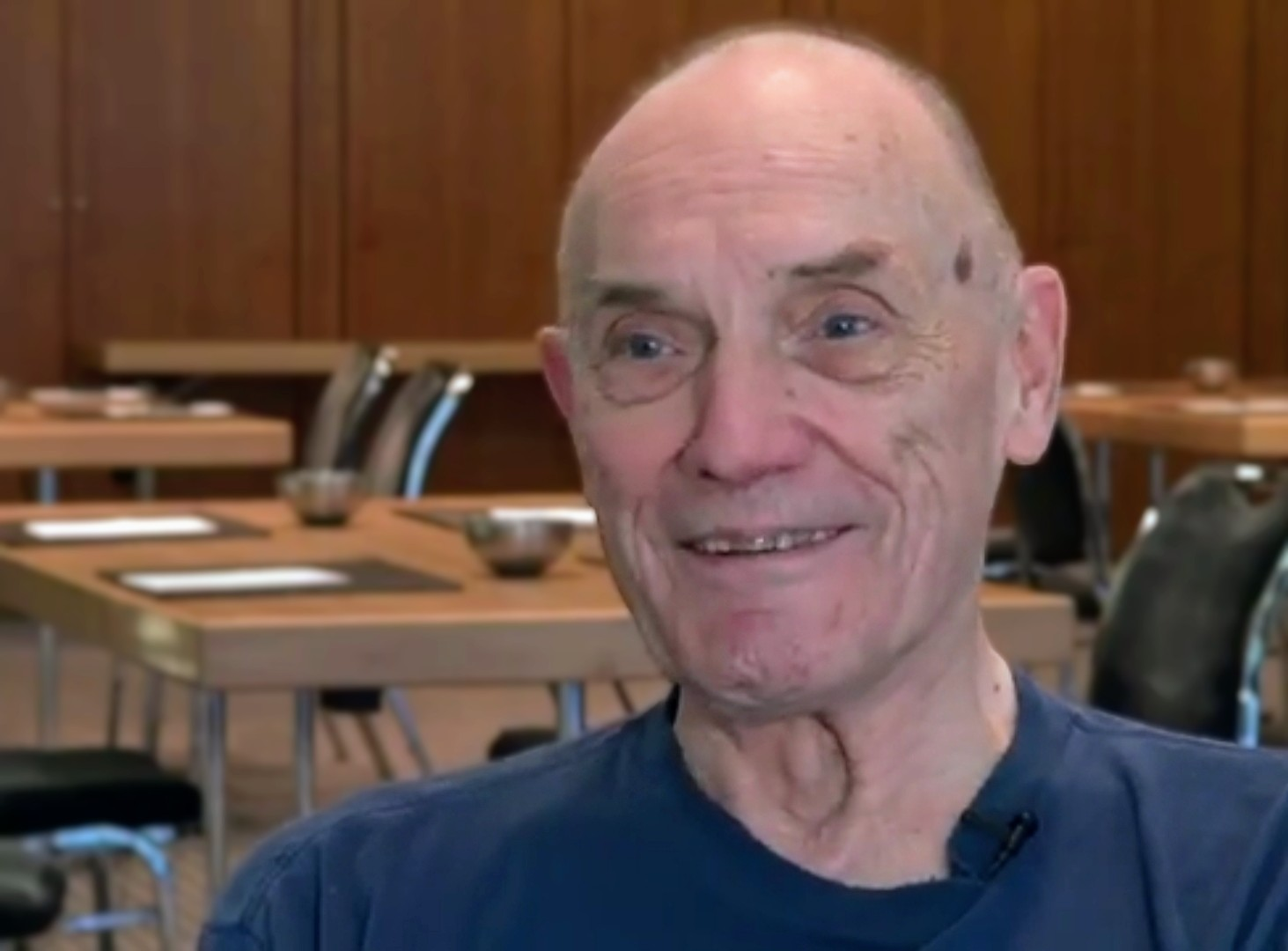
- Education: Princeton University; Swarthmore College
- Scientific career
- Workplaces: Johns Hopkins University

Stephen South Wolff is one of the many fathers of the Internet. He is mainly credited with turning the Internet from a government project into something that proved to have scholarly and commercial interest for the rest of the world. Dr. Wolff realized before most the potential in the Internet and began selling the idea that the Internet could have a profound effect on both the commercial and academic world.

== Education ==
Stephen Wolff earned a BSc with Highest Honors in Electrical Engineering from Swarthmore College in 1957, and a Ph.D. in Electrical Engineering from Princeton University in 1961. In 1962 he continued his studies with post-doctoral work at Imperial College. He taught electrical engineering at the Johns Hopkins University for ten years.

== Contributions to the Internet ==
For fourteen years, Wolff worked as a communications and technology researcher for the United States Army. While working for the Army, Wolff introduced the UNIX operating system to Army labs in the early 1980s. Also while working for the Army, Wolff managed a research group at the Aberdeen Proving Ground that participated in the development of ARPANET, a major technology precursor to the Internet, and its linking to the US Army's network of supercomputers.

In 1986, Wolff became Division Director for Networking and Communications Research and Infrastructure at the National Science Foundation and worked on commercializing the Internet by building a government-funded network that extended the ARPANET design into the civilian world, and spinning it off to the private sector. He managed the NSFNET project which included a national backbone network in the U.S. that interconnected NSF sponsored supercomputing centers, regional research and education networks, federal agency networks, and international research and education networks. The five super computing centers were located at Princeton, Cornell, the University of California at San Diego, the University of Illinois at Urbana-Champaign, and the University of Pittsburgh/Carnegie-Mellon University. Wolff also managed grants to link the nation's universities together into regional networks that connected to the backbone and so provided universal connectivity to the academic community. The NSFNET was compatible with, interconnected to, and eventually replaced the ARPANET network.

In an era when network speeds of 155 mb/s were still under commercial development, Wolff and Ira Richer at DARPA jointly funded Bob Kahn's "Gigabit Testbeds" project that proved the feasibility of IP networking at gigabit speeds.

In 1994, Wolff left NSF and joined Cisco where he helped with projects such as Internet2 and the Abilene Network. Wolff's career at Cisco began as business development manager for the Academic Research and Technology Initiative program. There, Wolff helped advance the University Research Project (URP) which supports academic research candidates with grants to further networking technology. He was named the interim Vice President and Chief Technology Officer of Internet2 on March 31, 2011. Also in 1994, Wolff joined the Board of Directors of the Internet Systems Consortium, on which he has served ever since. In 2014, Wolff was appointed to the Board of the DONA Foundation, a Swiss non-profit that encourages and supports the widespread use of persistent digital object identifiers.

== Major awards ==
In 2002 the Internet Society recognized Wolff with its Postel Award. When presenting the award, Internet Society (ISOC) President and CEO Lynn St. Amour said “…Steve helped transform the Internet from an activity that served the specific goals of the research community to a worldwide enterprise which has energized scholarship and commerce throughout the world.”

The Internet Society also recognized Wolff in 1994 for his courage and leadership in advancing the Internet.

In 2013, Dr. Wolff was inducted into the Internet Hall of Fame.
