= Merit Network =

Global LTE

- Founded: 1966; 60 years ago
- Founder: Michigan State University; University of Michigan; Wayne State University
- Type: Non-profit member governed
- Purpose: Internet networking
- Location: Ann Arbor, Michigan, United States
- Region served: Primarily Michigan
- Website: www.merit.edu
- Formerly called: Michigan Educational Research Information Triad

Merit Network, Inc., is a nonprofit member-governed organization providing high-performance computer networking and related services to educational, government, health care, and nonprofit organizations, primarily in Michigan. Created in 1966, Merit operates the longest running regional computer network in the United States.

== Organization ==
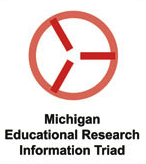
Original Merit logo, c. 1968

Created in 1966 as the Michigan Educational Research Information Triad by Michigan State University (MSU), the University of Michigan (U-M), and Wayne State University (WSU), Merit was created to investigate resource sharing by connecting the mainframe computers at these three Michigan public research universities. Merit's initial three node packet-switched computer network was operational in October 1972 using custom hardware based on DEC PDP-11 minicomputers and software developed by the Merit staff and the staffs at the three universities.

Over the next dozen years the initial network grew as new services such as dial-in terminal support, remote job submission, remote printing, and file transfer were added; as gateways to the national and international Tymnet, Telenet, and Datapac networks were established, as support for the X.25 and TCP/IP protocols was added; as additional computers such as WSU's MVS system and the UM's electrical engineering's VAX running UNIX were attached; and as new universities became Merit members.

Merit's involvement in national networking activities started in the mid-1980s with connections to the national supercomputing centers and work on the 56 kbit/s National Science Foundation Network (NSFNET), the forerunner of today's Internet. From 1987 until April 1995, Merit re-engineered and managed the NSFNET backbone service.

MichNet, Merit's regional network in Michigan was attached to NSFNET and in the early 1990s Merit began extending "the Internet" throughout Michigan, offering both direct connect and dial-in services, and upgrading the statewide network from 56 kbit/s to 1.5 Mbit/s, and on to 45, 155, 622 Mbit/s, and eventually 1 and 10 Gbit/s. In 2003 Merit began its transition to a facilities based network, using fiber optic facilities that it shares with its members, that it purchases or leases under long-term agreements, or that it builds.

In addition to network connectivity services, Merit offers a number of related services within Michigan and beyond, including: Internet2 connectivity, VPN, Network monitoring, Voice over IP (VOIP), Cloud storage, E-mail, Domain Name, Network Time, VMware and Zimbra software licensing, Colocation, and professional development seminars, workshops, classes, conferences, and meetings.

== History ==
=== Creating the network: 1966 to 1973 ===
The Michigan Educational Research Information Triad (MERIT) was formed in the fall of 1966 by Michigan State University (MSU), University of Michigan (U-M), and Wayne State University (WSU). More often known as the Merit Computer Network or simply Merit, it was created to design and implement a computer network connecting the mainframe computers at the universities.

In the fall of 1969, after funding for the initial development of the network had been secured, Bertram Herzog was named director for MERIT. Eric Aupperle was hired as senior engineer, and was charged with finding hardware to make the network operational. The National Science Foundation (NSF) and the State of Michigan provided the initial funding for the network.

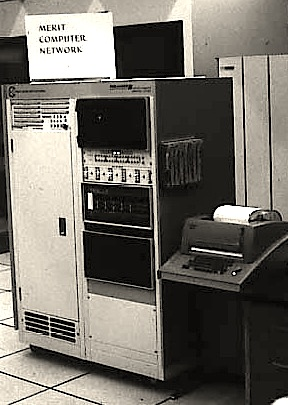
Merit PDP-11 based Primary Communications Processor (PCP) at the University of Michigan, c. 1975

In June 1970, the Applied Dynamics Division of Reliance Electric in Saline, Michigan was contracted to build three Communication Computers or CCs. Each would consist of a Digital Equipment Corporation (DEC) PDP-11 computer, dataphone interfaces, and interfaces that would attach them directly to the mainframe computers. The cost was to be slightly less than the $300,000 ($2,487,100, adjusted for inflation) originally budgeted. Merit staff wrote the software that ran on the CCs, while staff at each of the universities wrote the mainframe software to interface to the CCs.

The first completed connection linked the IBM S/360-67 mainframe computers running the Michigan Terminal System at WSU and U-M, and was publicly demonstrated on December 14, 1971. The MSU node was completed in October 1972, adding a CDC 6500 mainframe running Scope/Hustler. The network was officially dedicated on May 15, 1973.

=== Expanding the network: 1974 to 1985 ===
In 1974, Herzog returned to teaching in the University of Michigan's Industrial Engineering Department, and Aupperle was appointed as director.

Use of the all uppercase name "MERIT" was abandoned in favor of the mixed case "Merit".

The first network connections were host to host interactive connections which allowed person to remote computer or local computer to remote computer interactions. To this, terminal to host connections, batch connections (remote job submission, remote printing, batch file transfer), and interactive file copy were added. And, in addition to connecting to host computers over custom hardware interfaces, the ability to connect to hosts or other networks over groups of asynchronous ports and via X.25 were added.

Merit interconnected with Telenet (later SprintNet) in 1976 to give Merit users dial-in access from locations around the United States. Dial-in access within the U.S. and internationally was further expanded via Merit's interconnections to Tymnet, ADP's Autonet, and later still the IBM Global Network as well as Merit's own expanding network of dial-in sites in Michigan, New York City, and Washington, D.C.

In 1978, Western Michigan University (WMU) became the fourth member of Merit (prompting a name change, as the acronym Merit no longer made sense as the group was no longer a triad).

To expand the network, the Merit staff developed new hardware interfaces for the Digital PDP-11 based on printed circuit technology. The new system became known as the Primary Communications Processor (PCP), with the earliest PCPs connecting a PDP-10 located at WMU and a DEC VAX running UNIX at U-M's Electrical Engineering department.

A second hardware technology initiative in 1983 produced the smaller Secondary Communication Processors (SCP) based on DEC LSI-11 processors. The first SCP was installed at the Michigan Union in Ann Arbor, creating UMnet, which extended Merit's network connectivity deeply into the U-M campus.

In 1983 Merit's PCP and SCP software was enhanced to support TCP/IP and Merit interconnected with the ARPANET.

=== National networking, NSFNET, and the Internet: 1986 to 1995 ===
In 1986 Merit engineered and operated leased lines and satellite links that allowed the University of Michigan to access the supercomputing facilities at Pittsburgh, San Diego, and NCAR.

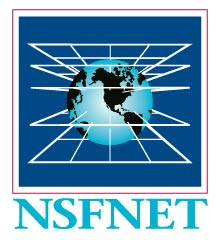
NSFNET logo

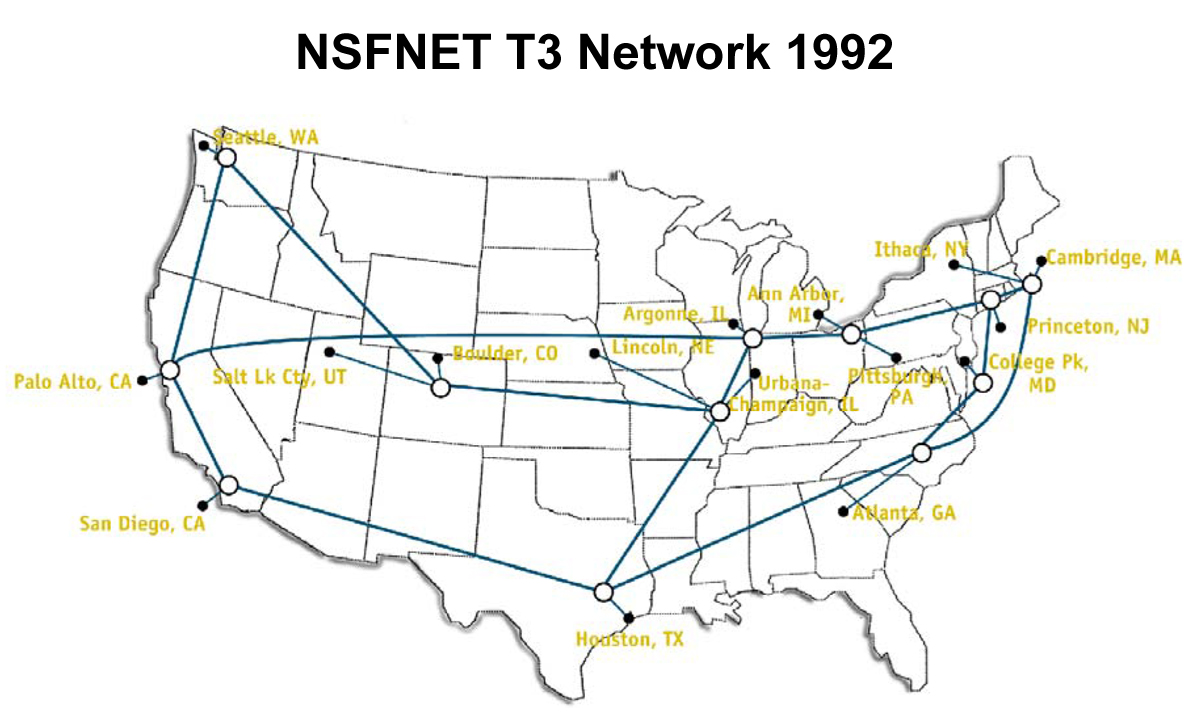
T3 NSFNET Backbone, c. 1992

In 1987, Merit, IBM and MCI submitted a winning proposal to NSF to implement a new NSFNET backbone network. The new NSFNET backbone network service began July 1, 1988. It interconnected supercomputing centers around the country at 1.5 megabits per second (T1), 24 times faster than the 56 kilobits-per-second speed of the previous network. The NSFNET backbone grew to link scientists and educators on university campuses nationwide and connect them to their counterparts around the world.

The NSFNET project caused substantial growth at Merit, nearly tripling the staff and leading to the establishment of a new 24-hour Network Operations Center at the U-M Computer Center.

In September 1990 in anticipation of the NSFNET T3 upgrade and the approaching end of the 5-year NSFNET cooperative agreement, Merit, IBM, and MCI formed Advanced Network and Services (ANS), a new non-profit corporation with a more broadly based Board of Directors than the Michigan-based Merit Network. Under its cooperative agreement with NSF, Merit remained ultimately responsible for the operation of NSFNET, but subcontracted much of the engineering and operations work to ANS.

In 1991 the NSFNET backbone service was expanded to additional sites and upgraded to a more robust 45 Mbit/s (T3) based network. The new T3 backbone was named ANSNet and provided the physical infrastructure used by Merit to deliver the NSFNET Backbone Service.

On April 30, 1995, the NSFNET project came to an end, when the NSFNET backbone service was decommissioned and replaced by a new Internet architecture with commercial Internet service providers (ISPs) interconnected at Network Access Points provided by multiple providers across the country.

=== Bringing the Internet to Michigan: 1985 to 2001 ===
New Merit logo, c. 1990

During the 1980s, Merit Network grew to serve eight member universities, with Oakland University joining in 1985 and Central Michigan University, Eastern Michigan University, and Michigan Technological University joining in 1987.

MichNet logo, c. 1990

In 1990, Merit's board of directors formally changed the organization's name to Merit Network, Inc., and created the name MichNet to refer to Merit's statewide network. The board also approved a staff proposal to allow organizations other than publicly supported universities, referred to as affiliates, to be served by MichNet without prior board approval.

1992 saw major upgrades of the MichNet backbone to use Cisco routers in addition to the PDP-11 and LSI-11 based PCPs and SCPs. This was also the start of relentless upgrades to higher and higher speeds, first from 56 kbit/s to T1 (1.5 Mbit/s) followed by multiple T1s (3.0 to 10.5 Mbit/s), T3 (45 Mbit/s), OC3c (155 Mbit/s), OC12c (622 Mbit/s), and eventually one and ten gigabits (1000 to 10,000 Mbit/s).

In 1993 Merit's first Network Access Server (NAS) using RADIUS (Remote Authentication Dial-In User Service) was deployed. The RADIUS server was developed by Livingston Enterprises. The NASs supported dial-in access separate from the Merit PCPs and SCPs.

In 1993 Merit started what would become an eight-year phase out of its aging PCP and SCP technology. By 1998 the only PCPs still in service were supporting Wayne State University's MTS mainframe host. During their remarkably long twenty-year life cycle the number of PCPs and SCPs in service reached a high of roughly 290 in 1991, supporting a total of about 13,000 asynchronous ports and numerous LAN and WAN gateways.

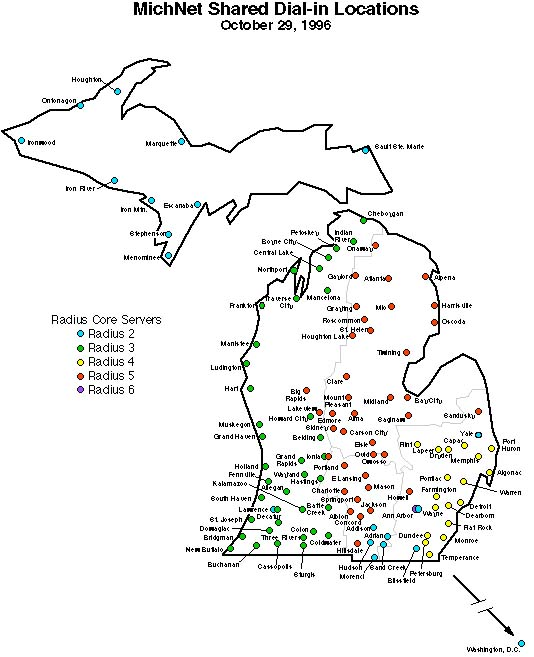
MichNet Shared Dial-in Map, c. 1996

In 1994 the Merit Board endorsed a plan to expand the MichNet shared dial-in service, leading to a rapid expansion of the Internet dial-in service over the next several years. In 1994 there were 38 shared dial-in sites. By 1996 there were 131 shared dial-in sites and more than 92% of Michigan residents could reach the Internet with a local phone call. And by the end of 2001 there were 10,733 MichNet shared dial-in lines in over 200 Michigan cities plus New York City, Washington, D.C., and Windsor, Ontario, Canada. As an outgrowth of this work, in 1997, Merit created the Authentication, Authorization, and Accounting (AAA) Consortium.

During 1994 an expanded K-12 outreach program at Merit helped lead the formation of six regional K-12 groups known as Hubs. The Hubs and Merit applied for and were awarded funding from the Ratepayer fund, which as part of a settlement of an earlier Ameritech of Michigan ratepayer overcharge, had been established by Michigan Public Service Commission to further the K-12 community's network connectivity.

During the 1990s, Merit added Grand Valley State University (1994), Northern Michigan University (1994), Lake Superior State University (1997), and Ferris State University (1998) as members. By 1999, Merit had 163 affiliate members, with 401 attachments from 353 separate locations.

Merit was involved in a number of projects in cooperation with organizations throughout Michigan, including:

- Project Connect, a 1992 cooperative effort among Merit, Novell, and GTE, that equipped five southeastern Michigan schools with Novell Local Area Networks with connections to MichNet;
- GoMLink, an early virtual library reference service operated by the University of Michigan;
- the Michigan Electronic Library (MEL), a networked virtual library service of the Library of Michigan and the University of Michigan;
- the Michigan Library Association's "Action Plan for Michigan Libraries"; Internet dial-in access for libraries sponsored by the Library of Michigan;
- development of the "Michigan Information Network (MIN) Plan";
- in cooperation with MiCTA, providing assistance to the K-12, library, and rural healthcare communities in understanding the federal Universal Service Fund (USF) E-Rate program; and
- the Society of Manufacturing Engineers CoNDUIT project, funded by the United States Department of Defense to train staff of small manufacturing businesses in the use of modern technology.

=== Transition to the commercial Internet, Internet2 and the vBNS: 1994 to 2005 ===
In 1994, as the NSFNET project was drawing to a close, Merit organized the meetings for the North American Network Operators' Group (NANOG). NANOG evolved from the NSFNET "Regional-Techs" meetings, where technical staff from the regional networks met to discuss operational issues of common concern with each other and with the Merit engineering staff. At the February 1994 regional techs meeting in San Diego, the group revised its charter to include a broader base of network service providers, and subsequently adopted NANOG as its new name.

Also starting in 1994, Merit developed the Routing Assets Database (RADb) as part of the NSF-funded Routing Arbiter Project.

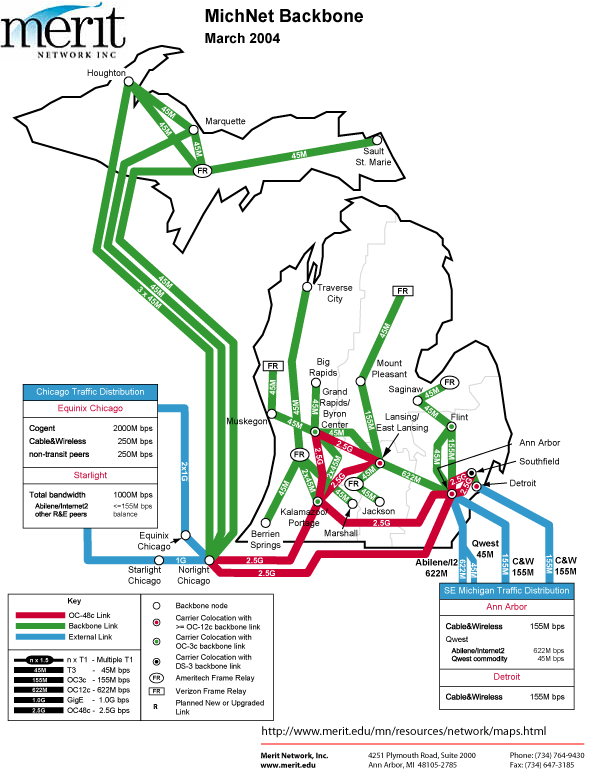
MichNet Backbone Map, c. 2004

MichNet obtained its initial commodity Internet access, a T3 (45 Mbit/s), from the commercial ISP, internetMCI.

In 1996 Merit became an affiliate member of Internet2, in 1997 established its first connection to the NSF very high-speed Backbone Network Service (vBNS), and in February 1999 began serving as Michigan's GigaPOP for Internet2 service.

Following the NSFNET project Merit lead a number of activities with a national or international scope, including:

- the GateD Consortium (1995);
- the 1997 NSF funded Multi-threaded Routing Toolkit project;
- the 1997 NSF funded Internet Performance Measurement and Analysis (IPMA) project, a joint project with U-M's Electrical Engineering and Computer Science;
- the 1996 NETSCARF network statistics collection and analysis project, funded by the ANS Resource Allocation Committee; and
- the 1999 DARPA funded Lighthouse project focusing on large-scale network attack recognition, remediation and survivable network infrastructure led by the University of Michigan College of Engineering.

In 2000, Merit spun off two for-profit companies: NextHop Technologies, which developed and marketed GateD routing software, and Interlink Networks, which specialized in authentication, authorization, and accounting (AAA) software.

Eric Aupperle retired as president in 2001, after 27 years at Merit. He was appointed President Emeritus by the Merit board. Hunt Williams became Merit's new president.

=== Creating a facilities based network, adding new services: 2003 to the present ===
In 2004 Michael R. McPherson was named Merit's interim president and CEO.

In January 2005 Merit and Internet2 moved into the new Michigan Information Technology Center (MITC) in Ann Arbor.

In 2006, Dr. Donald J. Welch was named president and CEO of Merit Network, Inc.

In December 2006 Merit and OSTN partner to provide IPTV to Michigan institutions. OSTN is a global television network devoted to student-produced programming.

In July 2007, Merit decommissioned its dial-up services.

During the 1970s, 1980s, and 1990s Merit operated what is known as a "value-added network" where individual data circuits were leased on a relatively short-term basis (one to three or sometimes five years) from traditional telecommunications providers such as Ameritech, GTE, Sprint, and MCI and assembled into a larger network by adding routers and other equipment. This worked well for many years, but as data rates continued to increase from kilobits, to megabits, to gigabits the cost of leasing the higher speed data circuits became significant. As a result, the alternative of building its network using "dark fiber" that Merit owned or leased on a relatively longer-term basis (10, 20, or more years) under what are known as "Indefeasible Rights of Use" (IRU) as well as using or sharing fiber that is owned by its members became attractive.

Merit's statewide fiber-optic network strategy began to take shape when:

- in 2003 a fiber ring was deployed in Lansing;
- in 2003 Michigan State University, the University of Michigan, and Wayne State University launched the Michigan LambdaRail Network (MiLR) project to link the campuses to each other and to Chicago using privately owned fiber, with Merit to operate MiLR on behalf of the three universities and using some of the MiLR fiber for its own network;
- in 2004 fiber rings were added in Grand Rapids and Chicago;
- in August 2005 Merit was utilizing dark fiber from Michigan Lambda Rail (MiLR) between Detroit and Chicago to support the southern portion of its network backbone;
- in July 2006 Merit began to use optical fiber that had been installed by a consortium of government and community organizations in the Alpena area;
- in February 2006 Merit and the Ontario Research and Innovation Optical Network (ORION) were linked using fiber optic cable across the US-Canada border through the Detroit–Windsor Tunnel, later in September 2008, a wireless connection across the Soo Locks between Sault Ste. Marie, Michigan and Sault Ste. Marie, Ontario provided a second link between Merit and ORION;
- in September 2007 Merit created the first high-speed network connection between Michigan's two peninsulas with fiber optic cable across the Mackinac Bridge;
- in November 2007 Merit completed Phase I of its fiber network expansion into the Upper Peninsula of Michigan, connecting Lake Superior State University (LSSU), Michigan Technological University (MTU), and Northern Michigan University (NMU) via fiber-optic cable at gigabit Ethernet speeds;
- in May 2008 Merit completes a new fiber optic link from Southfield to Toledo providing a 10 Gbit/s link to OSCnet, Ohio's regional research and education network, and a second path between Merit and the Internet2 network;
- in March 2009 a partnership between the City of Hillsdale, Hillsdale College, Hillsdale County Intermediate School District (ISD), and Merit, completed a fiber-optic ring to improve connectivity in the city and reduce network costs for the Hillsdale-area organizations; and
- in December 2009 Merit began to use a new fiber optic link between Mt. Pleasant and Big Rapids. This completed the 500-mile (800 km) "Blue-Line" fiber optic network that links 16 cities in the lower half of Michigan's lower peninsula (Kalamazoo, Grand Rapids, Muskegon, Big Rapids, Mt. Pleasant, Midland, Saginaw, Flint, Pontiac, Rochester, Southfield, Ypsilanti, Ann Arbor, Jackson, East Lansing, and Battle Creek).

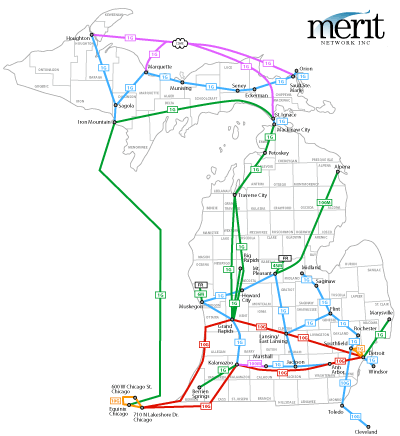
Merit Network backbone, January 2009

In July 2008, Merit began upgrading its core backbone network to 10 gigabits and installing five new Juniper MX480 routers. This upgrade was completed in May 2009 with seven backbone nodes in Grand Rapids, East Lansing, Detroit, Ann Arbor, Kalamazoo, and Chicago (2) all operating at 10 Gbit/s. Also during May 2009 Merit replaced its four 1 Gbit/s links to the commodity Internet with two 10 Gbit/s links over diverse paths to two different Tier 1 providers. And in October 2009 the links from Ann Arbor to Jackson and from Jackson and East Lansing were upgraded to 10 Gbit/s.

In January 2010, Merit and its partners, ACD.net; Lynx Network Group, LLC; and TC3Net; learned that their REACH-3MC (Rural, Education, Anchor, Community and Healthcare – Michigan Middle Mile Collaborative) proposal had been awarded ~$33.3M in grants and loans from the Broadband Technology Opportunities Program (BTOP), part of the federal stimulus package. REACH-3MC will build a 1,017-mile (1,637 km) optical fiber extension into rural and underserved communities in 32 counties in Michigan's lower peninsula.

In August 2010, Merit and its REACH-3MC partners were selected to receive US$69.6M in a second round of federal stimulus funding to build an additional 1,270 miles (2,040 km) of optical fiber in the northern lower peninsula and upper peninsula of Michigan and extending into Wisconsin.

At NANOG's 50th meeting in Atlanta in October 2010, members of the NANOG community supported a charter amendment to transition the hosting of NANOG following the February 2011 NANOG meeting to NewNOG, a newly formed non-profit.

On February 16, 2012, Merit's president and CEO, Donald Welch was honored as an Innovator in Infrastructure and "Champion of Change" during a ceremony that took place at the White House.

In August 2012, Merit announced that the first site of the Michigan Cyber Range would be installed at Eastern Michigan University. Merit hosts and operates the Michigan Cyber Range, a cybersecurity learning environment that, like a test track or a firing range, enables individuals and organizations to conduct "live fire" exercises, simulations that test the detection and reaction skills of participants in a variety of situations. Merit is partnering with the State of Michigan, Eastern Michigan University, Ferris State University, and others to provide this invaluable learning environment, which trains students and IT professionals to be better prepared for cyberattacks and how to react to Internet security situations.

In January 2013, the Michigan Cyber Range began a collaboration arrangement with Mile2, a developer and provider of vendor neutral professional certifications for the cyber security industry. Mile2 provides course materials, instructors and certification exams to the Michigan Cyber Range. Mile2 is recognized by the National Security Agency (NSA) as an Information Assurance (IA) Courseware Institution. Mile2 is NSA CNSS-accredited as well as NIST and NICCS mapped.

On April 8, 2013, Merit announced that round 1 of REACH-3MC construction was complete with fiber-optic cable along the 1,017-mile (1,637 km) network extension through rural and under served areas in Michigan's Lower Peninsula, including all 55 fiber-optic lateral connections to Merit Members from the middle-mile infrastructure. Portions of the fiber-optic network extension had been in use prior to the completion of round 1.

In May 2013, Merit hosted its 15th annual Merit Member Conference and its first annual Michigan Cybersecurity Industry Summit in Ann Arbor.

In June 2013, Merit honored as both a 2013 Computerworld Honors Laureate and 21st Century Achievement Award Winner for its REACH-3MC fiber-optic network project. Merit Network CEO and President Don Welch was honored at a gala celebration in Washington, D.C.

During the summer of 2013, Merit's Michigan Cyber Range debuted its cybersecurity training environment, Alphaville. The platform was used for training exercises, including a red team-blue team event conducted with the West Michigan Cyber Security Consortium (WMCSC).

In September 2013, Merit launched Merit Secure Sandbox, a secure environment that can be used by organizations for educational purposes, cybersecurity exercises, and software testing. In September, the Michigan Cyber Range also added a SCADA component to Alphaville.

In July 2014, Merit Network and WiscNet lit a new fiber-optic connection between Powers, Michigan; Marinette and Green Bay, Wisconsin; and Chicago, Illinois. The new 10 gigabit-per-second (Gbps) fiber-optic connection replaced two 1 Gbit/s circuits, providing greater capacity and speed between the Upper Peninsula and Chicago.

In October 2014, Merit completed the REACH-3MC fiber-optic infrastructure project, which built fiber-optic infrastructure across Michigan and in parts of Minnesota and Wisconsin. Merit connected 141 community anchor institutions, which includes schools, libraries, health care, government, and public safety. 70 additional organizations were also connected to the network by constructing last-mile fiber to the network. Each connection was a minimum of 1 gigabit-per-second (Gbps), providing broadband speeds to previously unserved or underserved parts of Michigan. Merit completed 2,287 miles of fiber-optic infrastructure, which is the equivalent of travelling from Ann Arbor to Orlando, Florida.

On April 30, 2015, Dr. Eric Aupperle died. Dr. Aupperle joined Merit Computer Network in 1969 as project leader. Eric was appointed director of Merit in 1974, became president in 1988, and retired 2001.

In August 2015, Joseph Sawasky, the chief information officer and associate vice president of computing and information technology at Wayne State University, was selected as the president and CEO of Merit Network.

In October 2015, Merit selected Jason Brown as the organization's first chief information security officer (CISO). The position was created as part of an ongoing mission to strengthen Merit Network's infrastructure, data and Member institutions from potential cyberattack.

In March 2016, the organization launched the Merit Commons, a social collaboration environment for its Member community. The secure, social portal enables Members to communicate and collaborate in real time with organic message streams, much like Facebook or Twitter.

At the annual Merit Member Conference in May 2016, Merit celebrated its 50th anniversary with a gala that included dignitaries, former staff, employees and Merit supporters. During a panel discussion, Doug Van Houweling from the University of Michigan and Steve Wolff from Internet2 provided a glimpse into the early days of Merit, the complex NSFNET project and how the technology and network protocols created by Merit's engineers influenced the internet. David Behen, chief information officer (CIO) for the State of Michigan, presented an honor from Governor Rick Snyder to Joe Sawasky on behalf of Merit Network, recognizing the organization's historic achievements.

During 2016, Merit added new publicly accessible hubs of the Michigan Cyber Range in Southeast Michigan. Cyber Range Hubs opened inside the Velocity Center at Macomb-Oakland University in Sterling Heights on March 18 and at Pinckney Community High School on December 7. Each location provides certification courses, cybersecurity training exercises and product hardening/testing through a direct connection to the Michigan Cyber Range.

In 2016, Merit began one of its largest projects; managing the implementation of the Michigan Statewide Education Network (MISEN), a private transport based network. MISEN connects 55 of Michigan's 56 Intermediate School Districts (ISDs) via high capacity fiber infrastructure. The project was completed on June 30, 2017, and the result was a 10 Gb connection to each ISD as well as a 100 Gb resilient core. Merit continues to manage MISEN, which gives Michigan ISDs the ability to leverage the multi-gigabit infrastructure for services like Internet access, student information systems, and other critical services, putting Michigan's schools at the forefront of technology and innovation. Throughout 2017, Merit has continued shifting their strategy to focus on network, security and community. They are now considered one of the national leaders in cybersecurity.

In 2019, Merit launched the Michigan Moonshot, an approach to impact the digital divide statewide.

In 2019, as part of the Michigan Moonshot, Merit partnered with national broadband organizations (including the Michigan Broadband Cooperative, Next Century Cities, and the Institute for Local Self Reliance) to create the Michigan Moonshot Broadband Framework. This crowdsourced document serves as a community network primer and the basis for planning a community roadmap. Contained within, a reader will find overviews on policy and technology, community success stories, links to myriad resources and planning tools from national broadband leaders and a phased plan for building a regional network. While much of this information exists online, it would serve as a blueprint for communities that are committed to improving broadband access for their citizens.

In May 2019, Merit Network, in partnership with Michigan State University's Quello Center and the D.C.-based Measurement Lab, launched a pilot for the Michigan Moonshot broadband data collection project. Three school districts, representing more than 6,000 students, were chosen. The data for this project consisted of three databases linked by a unique de-identified participant ID; including a paper survey completed by all students age 13 and older, student records (i.e., M-STEP scores) that were de-identified and results of an Internet speed test that students completed on a website using any device they used to complete homework.

Armed with an accurate picture of Michigan's connectivity, blockers to broadband network deployment in rural communities could be reduced through a combination of techniques. Pilot project findings are expected to be released in late fall, 2019.

On May 30, 2019, Merit hosted the Mackinac Policy Conference Session as part of the Michigan Moonshot initiative. President and CEO of Merit Network Joe Sawasky moderated a panel that featured state, regional, and national thought leaders, including: Dr. Johannes Bauer, Quello chair for media and information policy and chairman of the department of media and information at Michigan State University, Lt. Governor Garlin Gilchrist II, and Marc Hudson, founder and CEO of Rocket Fiber.

In October 2019, Merit's president and CEO, Joe Sawasky, joined Former FCC Commissioner, Mignon Clyburn, Jonathan Sallet, senior fellow at the Benton Institute, Larra Clark, deputy director at the American Library Association Public Policy and Luis Wong, CEO of the California K-12 High Speed Network for a panel discussion, Broadband for All in the 2020s at the 2019 SHLB Coalition’s Anchor NETS conference.

In 2019, Jonathan Sallet, Senior Fellow for the Benton Institute for Broadband & Society, published Broadband for America’s Future: A Vision for the 2020s. The purpose of this document is to collect, combine, and contribute to a national broadband agenda for the next decade. As the most transformative technology of our generation, broadband delivers new opportunities and strengthens communities. The Benton Institute upholds a commitment to changing lives and advancing society through high-performance broadband connection, which will bring remarkable economic, social, cultural, and personal benefits.

In 2019, Merit's Chief Information Security Officer role grew into an executive position, overseeing the Michigan Cyber Range and Merit's security division. Kevin Hayes has served as Merit's CISO since 2018.

In 2019, Merit Network partnered with MISEN (Michigan Statewide Educational Network) and MAISA (Michigan Association of Intermediate School Administrators) to develop Essential Cybersecurity Practices for K12. This guide translates the CIS Top 20 Security Controls into achievable actions that school IT staff can accomplish.

On October 19, 2019, Merit Network relocated from 1000 Oakbrook Drive in Ann Arbor, MI to 880 Technology Drive, Suite B, Ann Arbor, MI 48108. The 880 building provides a collaborative space with increased community access, including additional space available for rent by outside organizations.

On October 28, 2019, the Michigan National Guard and the Michigan Cyber Range hosted an International Cyber Exercise as part of the state's North American International Cyber Summit. Eleven teams from five countries and six states competed in an all-out, fast-paced cyber exercise that resembles the physical game of paintball.

On October 29, 2019, Merit hosted the 4th Annual Governor’s High School Cyber Challenge capstone event. More than 600 students from throughout Michigan participated in the event. Okemos High School won the competition.

== Merit today ==
Today, in addition to network connectivity, Merit offers:

- Point-to-point fiber-optic connections
- Internet2 connectivity
- Virtual Private Network (VPN) services
- Network monitoring
- Voice over IP (VOIP) services
- Multicast services
- Domain Name Systems
- Network Time Services
- Comodo SSL certificates, VMware, Veeam and Zimbra software licensing
- Colocation services, including business continuity and disaster recovery
- Federated identity management to facilitate single sign-on access to shared resources, applications, and content
- Routing Assets Database (RADb) public registry
- Professional development seminars, workshops, classes, conferences, and meetings
- Michigan Cyber Range courses on detecting, preventing, and thwarting cyber-attacks
- Communities of Practice – Security Community of Practicing Experts (SCOPE) Forum, Michigan Information Technology Executive (MITE) Forum, and Michigan Networking Directors (MiND)
- Security Services – Community Chief Information Security Officer consulting, DDoS Protection Service, Merit Managed Firewall, and DUO Security
- Merit Community Assistance Pact (MCAP) – Private group for inter-member communication to assist in continuity/disaster recovery events
- Michigan Moonshot – Phased plan to address the digital divide in Michigan
- MISEN – Connecting the Michigan K-12 Community to the state education network

== See also ==
- Timeline of the history of the Internet
