= Dynamic circuit network =

A dynamic circuit network (DCN) is an advanced computer networking technology that combines traditional packet-switched communication based on the Internet Protocol, as used in the Internet, with circuit-switched technologies that are characteristic of traditional telephone network systems. This combination allows user-initiated ad hoc dedicated allocation of network bandwidth for high-demand, real-time applications and network services, delivered over an optical fiber infrastructure.

== Implementation ==
Dynamic circuit networks were pioneered by the Internet2 advanced networking consortium. The experimental Internet2 HOPI infrastructure, decommissioned in 2007, was a forerunner to the current SONET-based Ciena Network underlying the Internet2 DCN. The Internet2 DCN began operation in late 2007 as part of the larger Internet2 network. It provides advanced networking capabilities and resources to the scientific and research communities, such as the Large Hadron Collider (LHC) project.

The Internet2 DCN is based on open-source, standards-based software, the Inter-domain Controller (IDC) protocol, developed in cooperation with ESnet and GÉANT2. The entire software set is known as the Dynamic Circuit Network Software Suite (DCN SS).

=== Inter-domain Controller protocol ===
The Inter-domain Controller protocol manages the dynamic provisioning of network resources participating in a dynamic circuit network across multiple administrative domain boundaries. It is a SOAP-based XML messaging protocol, secured by Web Services Security (v1.1) using the XML Digital Signature standard. It is transported over HTTP Secure (HTTPS) connections.

== See also ==
- Internet Protocol Suite
- IPv6
- Fiber-optic communication
