= NANOG =

NANOG may refer to:

- North American Network Operators' Group
- Homeobox protein NANOG, a transcription factor
