= Oracle Thinkquest =

Educational website

ThinkQuest

- The ThinkQuest homepage
- Website type: Educational website
- Available in: Chinese, Dutch, English, French, German, Hindi, Italian, Portuguese, Spanish, Thai, and Turkish
- Owner: Oracle Education Foundation
- Creator: Allan H. Weis
- Website: www.thinkquest.org
- Commercial: Nonprofit
- Registration: Required
- Launched: 1996 (acquired by Oracle in 2002)
- Current status: Discontinued (as of July 1, 2013)

ThinkQuest was an educational website, created 1996 and intended for primary and secondary schools. Beginning 2002 it was owned by the Oracle Education Foundation and was known as Oracle ThinkQuest.

== History ==
ThinkQuest was created in 1996 by Allan H. Weis as part of his nonprofit Advanced Network and Services (ANS). The website and competition were acquired by the Oracle Education Foundation in 2002. Prior to being acquired by the Oracle Education Foundation, April Wennerstrom (née Buther) led the international training and evaluation program for the competition and worked with a cadre of international educators and judges to identify scholarship recipients. During its time under ANS' leadership, the organization gave over $1.5 million dollars annually for scholarships and support for the student-created sites and program participants spanned over 75 countries and six continents. As of July 1, 2013, the ThinkQuest initiative was discontinued.

== Features ==
=== ThinkQuest Projects ===
ThinkQuest Projects was a website which assisted students and teachers to create web-based learning projects and collaborate with peers globally. It was available in 11 languages, including Chinese, Dutch, English, French, German, Hindi, Italian, Portuguese, Spanish, Thai, and Turkish.

== Competition ==
Thinkquest competition 2012 was the last competition organised by Oracle.
