= Government Open Systems Interconnection Profile =

The Government Open Systems Interconnection Profile (GOSIP) was a specification that profiled open networking products for procurement by governments in the late 1980s and early 1990s.

== Timeline ==
- 1988 - GOSIP: Government Open Systems Interconnection Profile published by CCTA, an agency of UK government
- 1988 - UK's CCTA commences work with France and West Germany on European Procurement Handbook (EPHOS)
- 1990 - The US specification requiring Open Systems Interconnection (OSI) protocols was first published as Federal Information Processing Standards document FIPS 146-1. The requirement for US Government vendors to demonstrate their support for this profile led them to join the formal interoperability and conformance testing for networking products, which had been done by industry professionals at the annual InterOp show since 1980.
- 1990 - Publication of European Procurement Handbook (EPHOS), intended to be a European GOSIP
- 1991 - 4th and final version of UK GOSIP released
- 1993 - Australia and New Zealand GOSIP Version 3 - 1993 Government Open Systems Interconnection Profile
- 1995 - FIPS 146-2 allowed "...other specifications based on open, voluntary standards such as those cited in paragraph 3 ("...such as those developed by the Internet Engineering Task Force (IETF)... and the International Telecommunications Union, Telecommunication Standardization Sector (ITU–T))"

In practice, from 1995 interest in OSI implementations declined, and worldwide the deployment of standards-based networking services since have been predominantly based on the Internet protocol suite. However, the Defense Messaging System continued to be based on the OSI protocols X.400 and X.500, due to their integrated security capabilities.

== See also ==
- OSI model
- ISO Development Environment (ISODE)
- Protocol Wars
- Timeline of the history of the Internet
