= Corporation for Research and Educational Networking =

American non-profit corporation

The Corporation for Research and Educational Networking, better known as CREN, was an American non-profit corporation originally composed of the higher education and research organizations participating in BITNET and CSNET. Its corporate name was adopted at the time of the merging of these two networks in 1989. CREN corporation had existed prior to that as a purely Bitnet body, and this would continue to be its dominant identity. (It discontinued CSNET services in 1991.) CREN supported the email-based services and applications that are a prominent feature of BITNET, and latterly a Public Key Infrastructure for higher education. In 2003, active CREN services were transitioned to other organizations, and the corporation dissolved itself.
