= MIDnet =

Grants were submitted to the National Science Foundation in the Spring of 1986, and in the Summer of 1986 NSF approved funding. In September 1987, MIDnet was the first NSFNET regional backbone network to become fully operational. The NSFNET regional backbone networks were the precursors to the Internet. MIDnet initially connected Iowa State University, Kansas State University, Oklahoma State University, the University of Kansas, the University of Missouri, the University of Nebraska–Lincoln, the University of Oklahoma, and Washington University in St. Louis with 56 kbit/s DDS leased telephone lines in a ring topology. The MIDnet ring was originally connected via a 56 kbit/s DDS leased telephone line from the Nebraska node to the NSFNET backbone. It was the first of the NSF-funded regional networks to become fully operational.

MIDnet transitioned from a university-based organization to non-profit status in 1992. Two years later, Global Internet, a Palo Alto, California start-up, acquired MIDnet and its name was changed to Global Internet Network Services. The original board of directors of MIDnet were reorganized as the MIDnet Research and Higher Education Advisory Council. Global Internet sold the Network Services division to Verio, Inc. in 1997 and later sold the consulting and implementation division to Exodus Communications.

MIDnet, Inc. is now a private foundation with a focus on data research and development of information for the research and education networking community.
