= Federal Networking Council =

Informally established in the early 1990s, the Federal Networking Council (FNC) was later chartered by the US National Science and Technology Council's Committee on Computing, Information and Communications (CCIC) to continue to act as a forum for networking collaborations among US federal agencies to meet their research, education, and operational mission goals and to bridge the gap between the advanced networking technologies being developed by research FNC agencies and the ultimate acquisition of mature version of these technologies from the commercial sector. The FNC consisted of a group made up of representatives from the United States Department of Defense (DoD), the National Science Foundation, the Department of Energy, and the National Aeronautics and Space Administration (NASA), among others.

By October 1997, the FNC advisory committee was de-chartered and many of the FNC activities were transferred to the Large Scale Networking group of the Computing, Information, and Communications (CIC) R&D subcommittee of the Networking and Information Technology Research and Development program, or the Applications Council.

On October 24, 1995, the Federal Networking Council passed a resolution defining the term Internet:

Resolution: The Federal Networking Council (FNC) agrees that the following language reflects our definition of the term Internet. Internet refers to the global information system that – (i) is logically linked together by a globally unique address space based on the Internet Protocol (IP) or its subsequent extensions/follow-ons; (ii) is able to support communications using the Transmission Control Protocol/Internet Protocol (TCP/IP) suite or its subsequent extensions/follow-ons, and/or other IP-compatible protocols; and (iii) provides, uses or makes accessible, either publicly or privately, high level services layered on the communications and related infrastructure described herein.'

Some notable members of the council advisory committee included: Henriette Avram, Matt Blaze, Vint Cerf, John Gage, Robert Kahn, Paul Mockapetris, Ike Nassi, Stewart Personick and Stephen Wolff.
