= National LambdaRail =

U.S. national computer network

- Region served: United States

National LambdaRail (NLR) was a 12,000-mile (19,000 km), high-speed national computer network owned and operated by the U.S. research and education community. In November 2011, the control of NLR was purchased from its university membership by a billionaire Patrick Soon-Shiong. NLR ceased operations in March 2014.

== Goals ==
The goals of the National LambdaRail project were:

- Provide infrastructure for multipurpose advanced networking
- Allow multiple high-speed networks to be run simultaneously

== Description ==
NLR used fiber-optic lines, and was the first transcontinental 10 Gigabit Ethernet network. Its high capacity (up to 1.6 Tbit/s aggregate), high bitrate (40 Gbit/s as of 2010; 100 Gbit/s as of 2011) and high availability (99.99% or more), enabled National LambdaRail to support demanding research projects. Users included NASA, the National Oceanic and Atmospheric Administration, Oak Ridge National Laboratory, and over 280 research universities and other laboratories. In 2009 National LambdaRail was selected to provide wide-area networking for U.S. laboratories participating in research related to the Large Hadron Collider project, based near Geneva, Switzerland.

It was primarily oriented to aid terascale computing efforts and to be used as a network testbed for experimentation with large-scale networks. National LambdaRail was a university-based and -owned initiative, in contrast to a university-corporate sponsorships such as Abilene Network and Internet2. National LambdaRail did not impose any acceptable use policies on its users, in contrast to commercial networks. This gave researchers more control to use the network for these research projects. National LambdaRail also supported a production layer, called "PacketNet," on its infrastructure.

Links in the network used dense wavelength-division multiplexing (DWDM), which allows up to 64 individual optical wavelengths to be used (depending on hardware configuration at each end) separated by 100 GHz spacing. At present, individual wavelengths are used to carry traditional OC-X (OC3, OC12, OC48 or OC192) time-division multiplexing circuits or Ethernet signals for Gigabit Ethernet or 10 Gigabit Ethernet.

National LambdaRail was founded in 2003, completed its first phase in 2004, and reached fully-operational status on its national, advanced fiber optic network in 2006. In addition to being the first transcontinental, production 10 Gigabit Ethernet network, National LambdaRail was also the first intelligently managed, nationwide peering and transit program focused on research applications.

In 2008, a company named Darkstrand purchased capacity on NLR for commercial use. By the end of the year the Chicago-based company was having trouble raising funding due to the Great Recession. On May 24, 2012 the NLR network operations center services were transferred to the Corporation for Education Network Initiatives in California. In October 2009 Glenn Ricart was named president and CEO. On September 7, 2010 Ricart announced his resignation.

In November 2011 the control of NLR was purchased from its university membership by a billionaire Patrick Soon-Shiong for $100M, who indicated his intention to upgrade NLR infrastructure and repurpose portions of it to support an ambitious healthcare project through NantHealth. The upgrade never took place. NLR ceased operations in March 2014.

== Member organizations ==
Members of National LambdaRail are state or regional optical networks, which provide connectivity to the individual universities and laboratories using NLR. NLR has 13 members which enable more than 280 research universities and government laboratories to connect to NLR. The following is a list, from the official National LambdaRail web site as of 2008, of LambdaRail member organizations.

- The Corporation for Education Network Initiatives in California
- Florida LambdaRail
- Front Range GigaPop / University Corporation for Atmospheric Research
- Lonestar Education and Research Network (LEARN)
- North Carolina Light Rail
- Oak Ridge National Laboratory (ORNL)
- Oklahoma State Regents for Higher Education
- Pacific Northwest Gigapop
- Pittsburgh Supercomputing Center (University of Pittsburgh/Carnegie Mellon University)
- Southeastern Universities Research Association
- Southern Light Rail
- The Virginia Tech Foundation/Mid Atlantic Terascale Partnership
- University of New Mexico (on behalf of the State of New Mexico)
