= CSNET =

Early computer network in the US

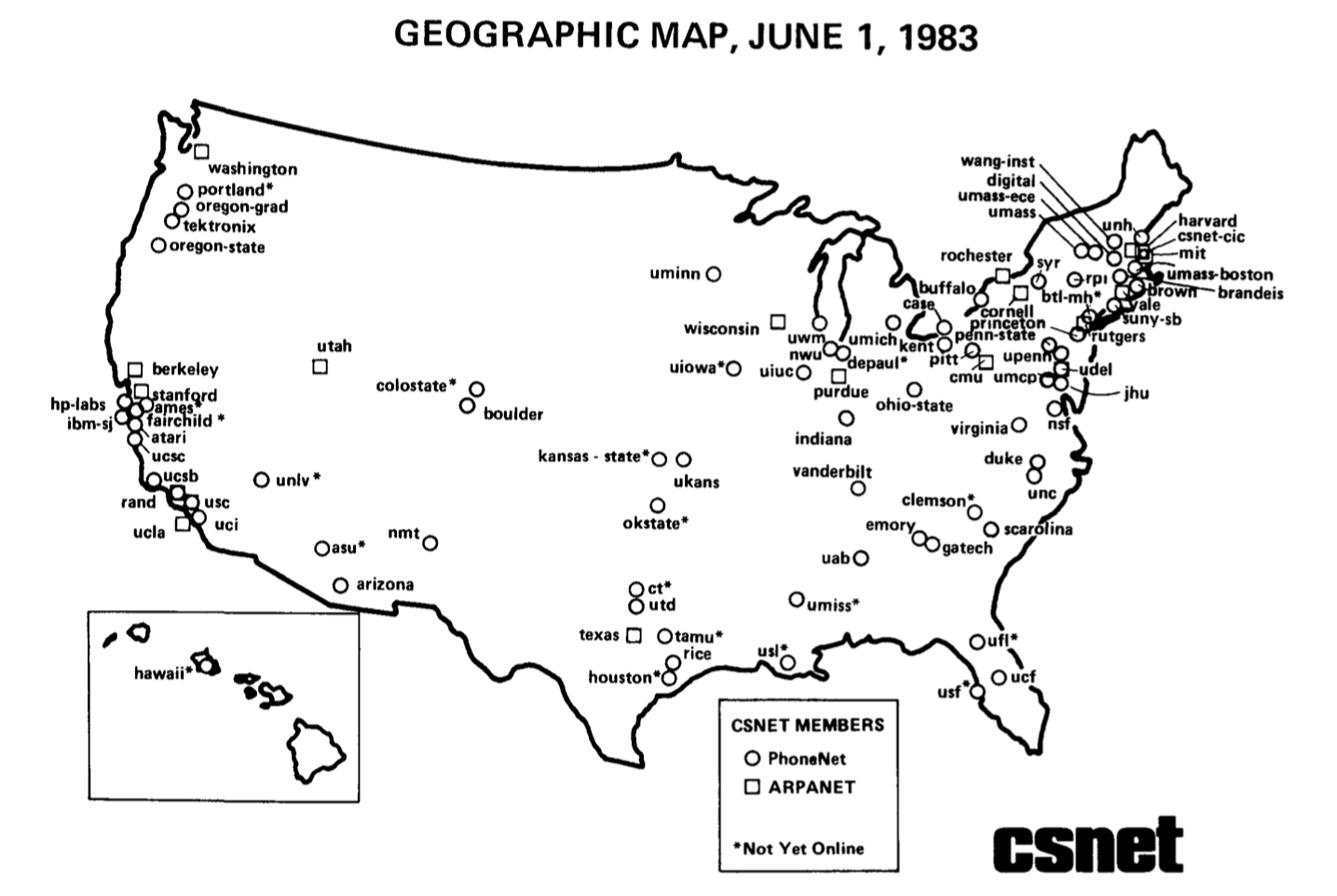
A diagram for CSNET members in the USA in 1983.

The Computer Science Network (CSNET) was a computer network that began operation in 1981 in the United States. Its purpose was to extend networking benefits, for computer science departments at academic and research institutions that could not be directly connected to ARPANET, due to funding or authorization limitations. It played a significant role in spreading awareness of, and access to, national networking and was a major milestone on the path to development of the global Internet. CSNET was funded by the National Science Foundation for an initial three-year period from 1981 to 1984.

== History ==
By 1986 about 150 computers connected to ARPANET, and about 2000 computers to the larger Arpa Internet. Membership of ARPANET was restricted to universities and companies with United States Department of Defense contracts. Other commercial, educational, and nonprofit organizations, ineligible for membership, wanted to interchange information with them.

Lawrence Landweber at the University of Wisconsin–Madison prepared the original CSNET proposal, on behalf of a consortium of universities (Georgia Tech, University of Minnesota, University of New Mexico, University of Oklahoma, Purdue University, University of California, Berkeley, University of Utah, University of Virginia, University of Washington, University of Wisconsin, and Yale University). The US National Science Foundation (NSF) requested a review from David J. Farber at the University of Delaware. Farber assigned the task to his graduate student Dave Crocker who was already active in the development of electronic mail. The project was deemed interesting but in need of significant refinement. The proposal eventually gained the support of Vinton Cerf and DARPA. In 1980, the NSF awarded $5 million to launch the network. It was an unusually large project for the NSF at the time. A stipulation for the award of the contract was that the network needed to become self-sufficient by 1986.

The first management team consisted of Landweber (University of Wisconsin), Farber (University of Delaware), Peter J. Denning (Purdue University), Anthony C. Hearn (RAND Corporation), and Bill Kern from the NSF. Once CSNET was fully operational, the systems and ongoing network operations were transferred to a team led by Richard Edmiston at Bolt Beranek and Newman (BBN) of Cambridge, Massachusetts by 1984.

The Purdue team, consisting of Peter Denning, Douglas Comer, and Paul McNabb, was responsible for designing and building the kernel interfaces that would allow sites outside of the ARPANET infrastructure to connect via public X.25 networks, such as Telenet. The mechanism allowed systems with TCP/IP network stacks to use an X.25 network device, with IP datagrams being sent through dynamically allocated X.25 sessions. Purdue and other sites with ARPANET access would act as gateways into the ARPANET, allowing non-ARPANet sites to have email, telnet, ftp, and other forms of network access directly into the ARPANET.

By 1981, three sites were connected: University of Delaware, Princeton University, and Purdue University. By 1982, 24 sites were connected expanding to 84 sites by 1984, including one in Israel. Soon thereafter, connections were established to computer science departments in Australia, Canada, France, Germany, Korea, and Japan. CSNET eventually connected more than 180 institutions, 60% universities, although as of 1988 most members only had email connections. Sites exchanged data via either X.25 or Phonenet, a store and forward protocol.

One of the earliest experiments in free software distribution on a network, netlib, was available on CSNET.

CSNET was a forerunner of the National Science Foundation Network (NSFNet) which eventually became a backbone of the Internet. CSNET operated autonomously until 1989, when it merged with BITNET to form the Corporation for Research and Educational Networking (CREN). By 1991, the success of the NSFNET and NSF-sponsored regional networks had rendered the CSNET services redundant, and the CSNET network was shut down in October 1991.

== Components ==
The CSNET project had three primary components: an email relaying service (Delaware and RAND), a name service (Wisconsin), and TCP/IP-over-X.25 tunnelling technology (Purdue). Initial access was with email relaying, through gateways at Delaware and RAND, over dial-up telephone or X.29/X.25 terminal emulation. Eventually CSNET access added TCP/IP, including running over X.25.

The email relaying service was called Phonenet, after the telephone-specific channel of the MMDF software developed by Crocker. The CSNET name service allowed manual and automated email address lookup based on various user attributes, such as name, title, or institution. The X.25 tunneling allowed an institution to connect directly to the ARPANET via a commercial X.25 service (Telenet), by which the institution's TCP/IP traffic would be tunneled to a CSNET computer that acted as a relay between the ARPANET and the commercial X.25 networks. CSNET also developed dialup-on-demand (Dialup IP) software to automatically initiate or disconnect SLIP sessions as needed to remote locations. CSNET was developed on Digital Equipment Corporation (DEC) VAX-11 systems using BSD Unix, but it grew to support a variety of hardware and operating system platforms.

== Recognition ==
At the July 2009 Internet Engineering Task Force meeting in Stockholm, Sweden, the Internet Society recognized the pioneering contribution of CSNET by honoring it with the Jonathan B. Postel Service Award. Crocker accepted the award on behalf of Landweber and the other principal investigators. A recording of the award presentation and acceptance is available.

== See also ==
- National Science Foundation Network
- Timeline of the history of the Internet
