= North American Network Operators' Group =

Technical forum for enterprise networking

- Abbreviation: NANOG
- Founded: February 1994; 32 years ago
- Location: United States
- Website: www.nanog.org

The North American Network Operators' Group (NANOG) is a forum for the coordination and dissemination of information to backbone/enterprise networking technologies and operational practices. It runs meetings, talks, surveys, and a mailing list for Internet service providers. The main method of communication is the NANOG mailing list (known informally as NANOG-l), a free mailing list to which anyone may subscribe or post.

== History ==
NANOG evolved from the NSFNET "Regional-Techs" meetings, where technical staff from the regional networks met to discuss operational issues. At the February 1994 regional tech meeting in San Diego, the group revised its charter to include a broader base of network service providers and subsequently adopted NANOG as its new name. NANOG was organized by Merit Network, a non-profit Michigan organization, from 1994 through 2011, when it was transferred to NewNOG.

=== Funding ===
Funding for NANOG originally came from the National Science Foundation as part of two projects Merit undertook in partnership with NSF and other organizations: the NSFNET Backbone Service and the Routing Arbiter project. All NANOG funds came from conference registration fees and donations from vendors, and starting in 2011, membership dues.

== Meetings ==
NANOG meetings are held three times each year and include presentations, tutorials, and BOFs (Birds of a Feather meetings). There are also lightning talks, where speakers can submit brief presentations (no longer than 10 minutes) on a very short term. Conference participants typically include senior engineering staff from tier 1 and tier 2 ISPs. In addition to the conferences, past NANOG On the Road events offered single-day networking events.

Meetings regularly also host a number of social events, which include Women in Tech meetup, group physical activities (called NANOG Active), a NANOG sponsor-hosted Happy Hour, a social event at a local nightlife spot (upcoming events include an indoor golf outing), ARIN happy hours, and other social events meant to build community. These are included with general registration tickets. Small group Peering Forums are also offered at select events, which are one-on-one industry networking sessions with focused conversations.

NANOG meetings are organized by NewNOG, Inc., a Delaware non-profit organization, which took over responsibility for NANOG from the Merit Network in February 2011. Meetings are hosted by NewNOG and other organizations from the U.S. and Canada. Overall leadership is provided by the NANOG Steering Committee, established in 2005, and a Program Committee.

Talk recordings are available to the public on NANOG's YouTube channel from all past events.

== See also ==
- Internet network operators' group
