= Very high-speed Backbone Network Service =

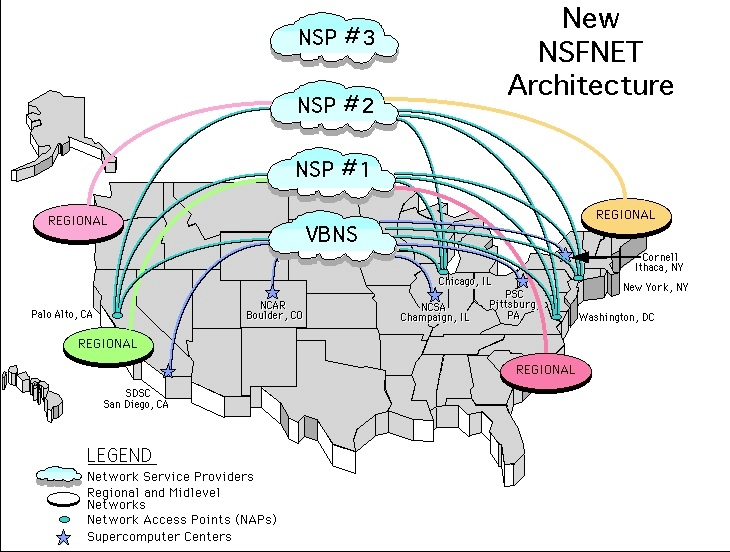
New network architecture, c. 1995

The very high-speed Backbone Network Service (vBNS) came on line in April 1995 as part of a National Science Foundation (NSF) sponsored project to provide high-speed interconnection between NSF-sponsored supercomputing centers and select access points in the United States. The network was engineered and operated by MCI Telecommunications under a cooperative agreement with the NSF.

NSF support was available to organizations that could demonstrate a need for very high speed networking capabilities and wished to connect to the vBNS or later to the Abilene Network, the high speed network operated by the University Corporation for Advanced Internet Development (UCAID, which operates Internet2).

By 1998, the vBNS had grown to connect more than 100 universities and research and engineering institutions via 12 national points of presence with DS-3 (45 Mbit/s), OC-3c (155 Mbit/s), and OC-12c (622 Mbit/s) links on an all OC-12c, a substantial engineering feat for that time. The vBNS installed one of the first ever production OC-48c (2.5 Gbit/s) IP links in February 1999, and went on to upgrade the entire backbone to OC-48c.

In June 1999 MCI WorldCom introduced vBNS+ which allowed attachments to the vBNS network by organizations that were not approved by or receiving support from NSF.

The vBNS pioneered the production deployment of many novel network technologies including Asynchronous Transfer Mode (ATM), IP multicasting, quality of service, and IPv6.

After the expiration of the NSF agreement, the vBNS largely transitioned to providing service to the government. Most universities and research centers migrated to the Internet2 educational backbone.

In January 2006 MCI and Verizon merged. The vBNS+ is now a service of Verizon Business.
