= Energy Sciences Network =

US-based computer network

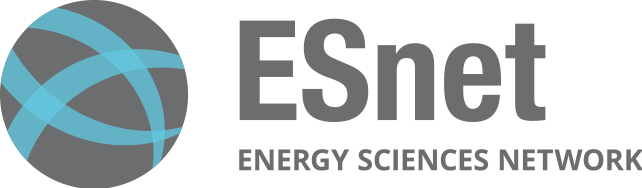

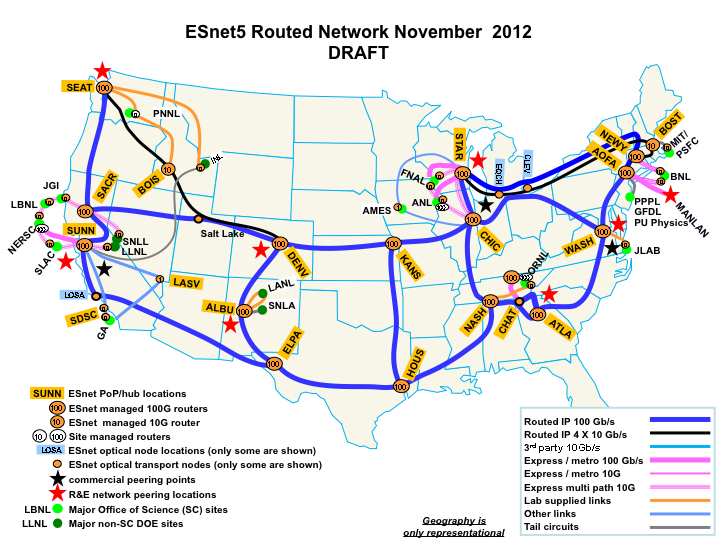
- ESnet map
- Abbreviation: ESnet
- Formation: 1986
- Region served: United States
- Website: www.es.net
- ASN: 293

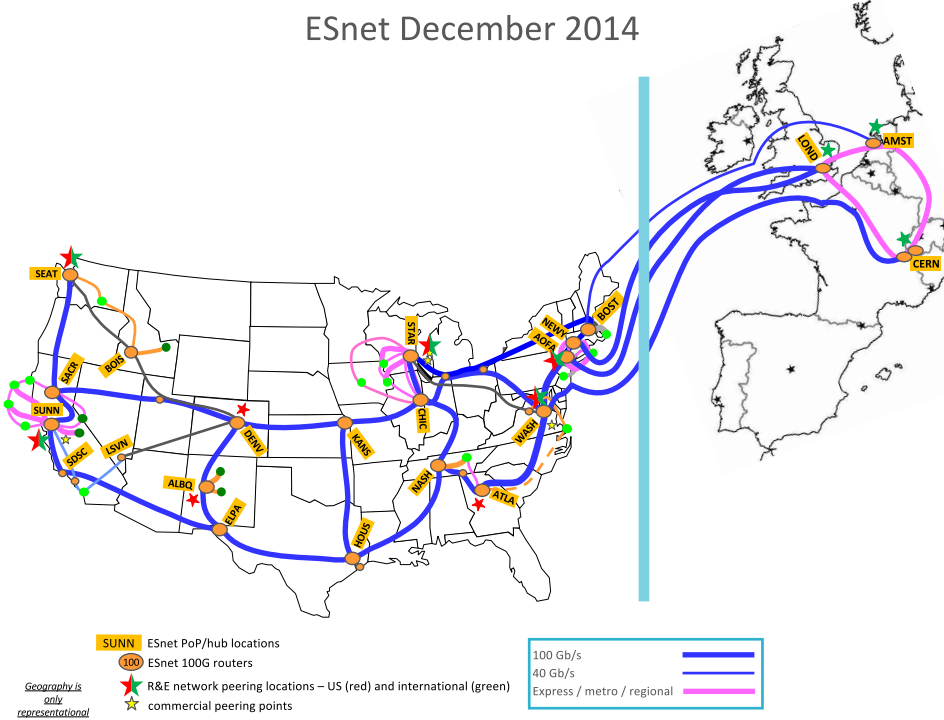
ESnet connection to Europe

The Energy Sciences Network (ESnet) is a high-speed computer network serving United States Department of Energy (DOE) scientists and their collaborators worldwide. It is managed by staff at the Lawrence Berkeley National Laboratory.

More than 40 DOE Office of Science labs and research sites are directly connected to this network. The ESnet network also connects research and commercial networks, allowing DOE researchers to collaborate with scientists around the world.

== Overview ==
The Energy Sciences Network (ESnet) is the Office of Science's network user facility, delivering data transport capabilities for the requirements of large-scale science. Formed in 1986, combining the operations of earlier DOE networking projects known as HEPnet (for high-energy physics) and MFEnet (for magnetic fusion energy research), ESnet is stewarded by the Scientific Computing Research Program, managed and operated by the Scientific Networking Division at Lawrence Berkeley National Laboratory and is used to enable the DOE science mission.

ESnet interconnects the DOE's national laboratory system, dozens of other DOE sites, research and commercial networks around the world, enabling scientists at DOE laboratories and academic institutions across the country to transfer data streams and access remote research resources in real time.

ESnet provides the networking infrastructure and services required by the national laboratories, large science collaborations, and the DOE research community. ESnet services aim to provide bandwidth connections to enable scientists to collaborate across a range of research areas across the USA and, since December 2014, Europe with a view to enhancing collaboration.

According to ESnet's own figures, during the period 1990 to 2019, average traffic volumes have grown by a factor of 10 every 47 months.

In 2009, ESnet received $62 million in American Research and Recovery Act (ARRA) funding from the DOE Office of Science to invest in its infrastructure to provide the necessary support for research discovery in this new era of data-intensive science.

ESnet5– ESnet's fifth-generation network – launched in November 2012, providing increased bandwidth to DOE research sites. ESnet is currently working on its next-generation upgrade named ESnet6.

== Current Network Configuration (ESnet 5) ==
In October 2011, ESnet rolled out its 100 Gbit/s backbone network, known internally as ESnet 5. The network is serving the entire DOE national laboratory system, its supercomputing centers, and its major scientific instruments at speeds 10 times faster than ESnet's previous generation network.

ESnet partnered with Internet2, the network that connects America's universities and research institutions, to deploy its 100 Gbit/s network over a new, highly scalable optical infrastructure that the two organizations share for the benefit of their respective communities.

The project was funded in 2009 by $62 million in American Recovery and Reinvestment Act funds. Called the Advanced Networking Initiative, the Gbit/s network was a project to handle the expanding data needs between DOE supercomputing facilities. In December 2014, ESnet extended its reach by deploying four new high-speed transatlantic links, giving researchers at America's national laboratories and universities ultra-fast access to scientific data from the Large Hadron Collider (LHC) and other research sites in Europe. ESnet's transatlantic extension delivers a total capacity of 340 gigabits per second (Gbit/s) and serves scientific collaborations. To maximize the resiliency of the new infrastructure, ESnet equipment in Europe will be interconnected by dedicated 100 Gbit/s links from the pan-European networking organization GÉANT. The new trans-Atlantic links build on the success of the US LHCNet, a collaboration between Caltech and CERN, led by Harvey Newman of Caltech.

== ESnet6 ==
ESnet's next-generation network, ESnet6, is designed to help the DOE research community navigate increasing data volumes by giving them more bandwidth, greater flexibility, and faster data transfer capabilities.

With a projected early finish in 2023, ESnet6 will purportedly feature a new software-driven network design that enhances the ability to rapidly invent, test, and deploy new innovations. The design is said to include:

- Optical, core, and service edge equipment deployed on ESnet's dedicated fiber optic cable backbone.
- A scalable switching core architecture coupled with a programmable services edge to facilitate high-speed data movement.
- 100 to 400 Gbit/s optical channels, with up to eight times the potential capacity compared to ESnet5.
- Services that monitor and measure the network 24/7/365 to ensure it is operating at peak performance.
- Cybersecurity capabilities to protect the network, assist its connected sites, and defend its devices in the event of a cyberattack.

== Research and Development ==
ESnet research and development programs have included:

- Software Defined Networking: ESnet has developed ENOS, the ESnet Network Operating system is a prototype architecture for handling data-intensive science workflows. The concept of a “network operating system,” a software layer that enables applications to get information about the network and to program it to meet its needs, has been discussed academically for a while but now appears feasible with the wide adoption of the Software-Defined Networking (SDN) paradigm. The ENOS approach will enable ESnet to build better application-engaged scientific networks and provide the interfaces, data, and programmability for applications or science virtual organizations to better orchestrate their multi-site complex big data projects and optimize their use of storage, compute, and cloud resources.
- Science DMZ: A network design pattern for securely routing large datasets around institutional firewall developed by ESnet and the National Energy Research Scientific Computing Center. Typically, located at the network perimeter, a DMZ has its own security policy and is specifically dedicated to external-facing high-performance science services – exchanging data with the outside world. With support from the National Science Foundation, universities across the country have deployed Science DMZs.
- 400 Gbit/s network: In 2015, ESnet and the National Energy Research Scientific Computing Center (NERSC) built a 400 gigabit-per-second super-channel, the first-ever 400G production link to be deployed by a national research and education network. The connection provided support for NERSC's users as the facility moved from its previous location in Oakland, Calif. to the main campus of Lawrence Berkeley National Laboratory in Berkeley, Calif. The team also set up a 400 Gbit/s research testbed for assessing new tools and technologies without interfering with production data traffic.
- OSCARS: The On-Demand Secure Circuits and Reservation System software developed at ESnet, and now open-sourced to the community, creates multi-domain, virtual circuits guaranteeing end-to-end data transfer performance on the network. OSCARS was recognized with an R&D 100 Award in 2013.
- perfSONAR: A test and measurement framework that provides end-to-end monitoring of multi-domain network performance. ESnet is a member of the international perfSONAR collaboration, along with GÉANT, Indiana University, and Internet2.

== Awards and honors for ESnet ==
- 2015 Secretary of Energy Achievement Award: Energy Secretary Ernest Moniz awarded for the development of OSCARS, the On-demand Secure Circuits and Reservation System. The Secretarial Honor Awards are the department's highest form of non-monetary employee recognition.
- 2015 CENIC Innovations in Networking Award: Awarded for their 100-Gigabit Software-Defined Networking (100G SDN) Testbed.
- 2012 InformationWeek's Top 10 Government IT Innovators: For the second time in four years, cited ESnet for its new 100 gigabit-per-second nationwide network funded as the Advanced Networking Initiative and launched into full production in November 2012.
- 2012 Fierce Innovators: For the ESnet5 Deployment Team, charged with rolling out the 100-Gigabit-per-second national network that entered production in November, to the first annual "Fierce 15" list of the top federal employees and teams who have done particularly innovative things.
- 2011 Internet2 IDEA Awards: Two ESnet projects received IDEA (Internet2 Driving Exemplary Applications) awards. Internet2 recognized OSCARS (On-Demand Secure Circuits and Advance Reservation System), developed by the ESnet team led by Chin Guok, including Evangelos Chaniotakis, Andrew Lake, Eric Pouyoul and Mary Thompson. ESnet's MAVEN (Monitoring and Visualization of Energy consumed by Networks) proof of concept application was also recognized with an IDEA award in the student category.
- 2009 - InformationWeek's Top 10 Government IT Innovators: Awarded for the development and deployment of On-Demand Secure Circuits and Reservation System (OSCARS).
- 2019 Excellence.Gov Award: Awarded for achievements in leveraging technology. The Excellence Gov awards are sponsored by the Industry Advisory Council's (IAC) Collaboration and Transformation Shared Interest Group and recognize the federal government's information technology (IT) projects.
