= Internet2 =

Computer networking consortium

- Formation: 1997 (as University Corporation for Advanced Internet Development)
- Purpose: Research and testing network
- Headquarters: Ann Arbor, Michigan, US
- Website: internet2.edu
- ASNs: 11537 (R&E); 11164 (I2PX)

Internet2 is a not-for-profit United States computer networking consortium led by members from the research and education communities, industry, and government. The Internet2 consortium administrative headquarters are located in Ann Arbor, Michigan, with offices in Washington, D.C., and Denver, Colorado.

As of November 2013, Internet2 has over 500 members including 251 institutions of higher education, 9 partners and 76 members from industry, over 100 research and education networks or connector organizations, and 67 affiliate members.

Internet2 operates the Internet2 Network, an Internet Protocol network using optical fiber that delivers network services for research and education, and provides a secure network testing and research environment. In late 2007, Internet2 began operating its newest dynamic circuit network, the Internet2 DCN, an advanced technology that allows user-based allocation of data circuits over the fiber-optic network.

Internet2 also operates the InCommon Federation, which facilitates authentication services and attributes among member institutions in the US and among eduGAIN members globally.

The Internet2 Network, through its regional network and connector members, connects over 60,000 U.S. educational, research, government and "community anchor" institutions, from primary and secondary schools to community colleges and universities, public libraries and museums to health care organizations.

The Internet2 community develops and deploys network technologies for the future of the Internet. These technologies include large-scale network performance measurement and management tools, secure identity and access management tools and capabilities such as scheduling high-bandwidth, high-performance circuits.

Internet2 members serve on several advisory councils, collaborate in a variety of working groups and special interest groups, gather at spring and fall member meetings, and are encouraged to participate in the strategic planning process.

== History ==
As the Internet gained in public recognition and popularity, universities were among the first institutions to outgrow the Internet's bandwidth limitations because of the data transfer requirements faced by academic researchers who needed to collaborate with their colleagues. Some universities wanted to support high-performance applications like data mining, medical imaging and particle physics. This resulted in the creation of the very-high-performance Backbone Network Service, or vBNS, developed in 1995 by the National Science Foundation (NSF) and MCI for supercomputers at educational institutions. After the expiration of the NSF agreement, vBNS largely transitioned to providing service to the government. As a result, the research and education community founded Internet2 to serve its networking needs.

The Internet2 Project was originally established by 34 university researchers in 1996 under the auspices of EDUCOM (later EDUCAUSE), and was formally organized as the not-for-profit University Corporation for Advanced Internet Development (UCAID) in 1997. It later changed its name to Internet2. Internet2 is a registered trademark.

The Internet2 community, in partnership with Qwest, built the first Internet2 Network, called Abilene, in 1998 and was a prime investor in the National LambdaRail (NLR) project. During 2004–2006, Internet2 and NLR held extensive discussions regarding a possible merger. Those talks paused in spring, 2006, resumed in March, 2007, but eventually ceased in the fall of 2007, due to unresolved differences.

In 2006, Internet2 announced a partnership with Level 3 Communications to launch a brand new nationwide network, boosting its capacity from 10 Gbit/s to 100 Gbit/s. In October, 2007, Internet2 officially retired Abilene and now refers to its new, higher capacity network as the Internet2 Network.

In 2010, Internet2 received a $62.5 million American Recovery and Reinvestment Act grant, which allowed Internet2 to put in place a long term IRU for fiber and upgrade the network with its own DWDM optical network system. Ciena later announced that this was the first 100G nationwide optical network. The upgrade to the new optical system was completed in December 2012.

== Objectives ==
Internet2 provides the U.S. research and education community with a network that satisfies their bandwidth-intensive requirements. The network itself is a dynamic, robust and cost-effective hybrid optical and packet network. It furnishes a 100 Gbit/s network backbone to more than 210 U.S. educational institutions, 70 corporations and 45 non-profit and government agencies.

The objectives of the Internet2 consortium are:

- Developing and maintaining a leading-edge network.
- Fully exploiting the capabilities of broadband connections through the use of new-generation applications.
- Transferring new network services and applications to all levels of educational use, and eventually the broader Internet community.

Internet has several broad areas of activities.They are roughly grouped into the following groupings:

- Network services - providing high-performance and sophisticated bandwidth and circuits , with effective cross-connects from institutions to cloud providers.
- Trust and identity - supporting open source federated identity software with access control capabilities and operating InCommon, a national R&E identity federation with linkages to both US governmental agencies and international federations through eduGAIN. One of the most popular services is eduroam, a global wifi network for R&E users.
- Net+ - A significant set of cloud-based services whose provisioning is structured to meet the unique business, legal and other constraints of the R&E community.

In addition, the Internet2 organization provides a set of community-oriented activities intended to support the use of the network and the federation. These activities include workshops, conferences, webinars, etc. In addition advisory groups set the directions and priorities for the organization.

The uses of the network span from collaborative applications, distributed research experiments, grid-based data analysis to social networking. Some of these applications are in varying levels of commercialization, such as IPv6, open-source middleware for secure network access, Layer 2 VPNs and dynamic circuit networks.

== Achievements ==
These technologies and their organizational counterparts were not only created to make a faster alternative to the Internet. Many fields have been able to use the Abilene network to foster creativity, research, and development in a way that was not previously possible. Users of poor quality libraries can now download not only text but sound recordings, animations, videos, and other resources, which would be otherwise unavailable. Another application is the robust video conferencing now available to Internet2 participants. Neurosurgeons can now video conference with other experts in the field during an operation in a high resolution format with no apparent time lag.

== Application awards ==
The Internet2 Driving Exemplary Applications (IDEA) award (not to be confused with IDEA awards) was first announced by Internet2 in 2006 as a way of recognizing those who create and use advanced network applications at their best. The judging was conducted by many universities and based upon the following criteria:

- Magnitude of the positive impact of the application for its (current) users
- Technical merit of the application.
- Breadth of impact, as indicated by current user base and likelihood of broader adoption by its full natural community of potential users

The award was presented annually through 2011.

== See also ==
- AARNet (Australia's Academic and Research Network)
- CANARIE (Canadian Network for the Advancement of Research, Industry and Education)
- CERNET (China Education and Research Network)
- CLARA (Cooperación Latino Americana de Redes Avanzandas)
- DFN (Deutsches Forschungsnetz), a German research network
- DREN, U.S. Department of Defense Research and Engineering Network
- ESnet (Energy Sciences Network)
- GÉANT, the pan-European research network
- HEAnet, Irish higher education network
- JANET, British academic network
- Kennisnet, Dutch public Internet organization
- LEARN (Lanka Education and Research Network)
- Merit Network, State of Michigan Triad Network
- NLR (National LambdaRail), U.S. research and education network
- NASK, Polish academic and research network
- NORDUnet (Nordic Infrastructure for Research & Education)
- Renater, French research network
- SURFnet, Dutch research network
- TERENA, defunct association of European national research and education networks
- TANet, Taiwanese research and academic network
