= Abilene Network =

Abilene Network was a high-performance backbone network created by the Internet2 community in the late 1990s. In 2007 the Abilene Network was retired and the upgraded network became known as the "Internet2 Network".

== History ==
One of the aims of the Abilene project was to achieve 10 Gbit/s connectivity between every node by the end of 2006. Over 230 member institutions participated in Abilene, mostly universities and some corporate and affiliate institutions, in all of the US states as well as the District of Columbia and Puerto Rico. It connected to European research networks NORDUnet and SURFnet. The legal entity behind the network was the University Corporation for Advanced Internet Development.

When it was established in 1999, the network backbone had a capacity of 2.5 Gbit/s. An upgrade to 10 Gbit/s began in 2003 and was completed on February 4, 2004.

The name Abilene was chosen because of the project's resemblance, in ambition and scope, to the railhead in Abilene, Kansas, which in the 1860s represented the frontier of the United States for the nation's railroad infrastructure.

== Abilene and Internet2 and the Internet2 Network ==
The media often incorrectly used the term "Internet2 Network" when referring to the "Abilene Network". Some sources even suggest that Internet2 is a network wholly separate from the Internet. This is misleading, since, at the time of the Abilene Network, Internet2 was the consortium and not a computer network. It is possible that some news sources adopted the term Internet2 because it seems like a logical name for a next-generation Internet backbone. Articles that reference Internet2 as a network were in fact referring to the Abilene Network. Internet2 adopted the name Internet2 Network for its entire network infrastructure.

Abilene formed a high-speed backbone by deploying cutting edge technologies not yet generally available on the scale of a national network backbone. Abilene was a private network used for education and research, but was not entirely isolated, since its members usually provide alternative access to a number of their resources through the public Internet.

== Operations Center (NOC) ==
Abilene's Network Operations Center (NOC) was hosted at Indiana University since its inception. "The cross-country backbone is 10 gigabits per second, with the goal of offering 100 megabits per second of connectivity between every Abilene connected desktop."

== 2006/2007 Upgrade ==
The Abilene project had used optical fiber networks donated by Qwest Communications. In March 2006, Internet2 announced its upgrade plans and migration to Level 3 Communications. Internet2's Abilene transport agreement with Qwest expired in October 2007. Unlike the previous architecture, Level 3 manages and operated an Infinera Networks based DWDM system devoted to Internet2. Internet2 has control over provisioning and uses the 40 wavelength capacity to provide IP backbone connectivity as well as transport for a new SONET-based dynamic provisioning network based on the Ciena Corporation CoreDirector platform. The IP network was based on the Juniper Networks T640 routing platform.

When the transition to the new Level3-based infrastructure was complete, the name Abilene ceased to be used in favor of The Internet2 Network.
