= Van Houweling =

Van Houweling is a surname. Notable people with the surname include:

- Douglas Van Houweling (born 1943), American academic
- Molly Shaffer Van Houweling (born 1973), American cyclist, academic, and legal scholar
- Mason Van Houweling (born 1970), American CEO

== See also ==
- Van Houwelingen
