= Ira Fuchs =

American computer scientist (born 1948)

Ira H. Fuchs
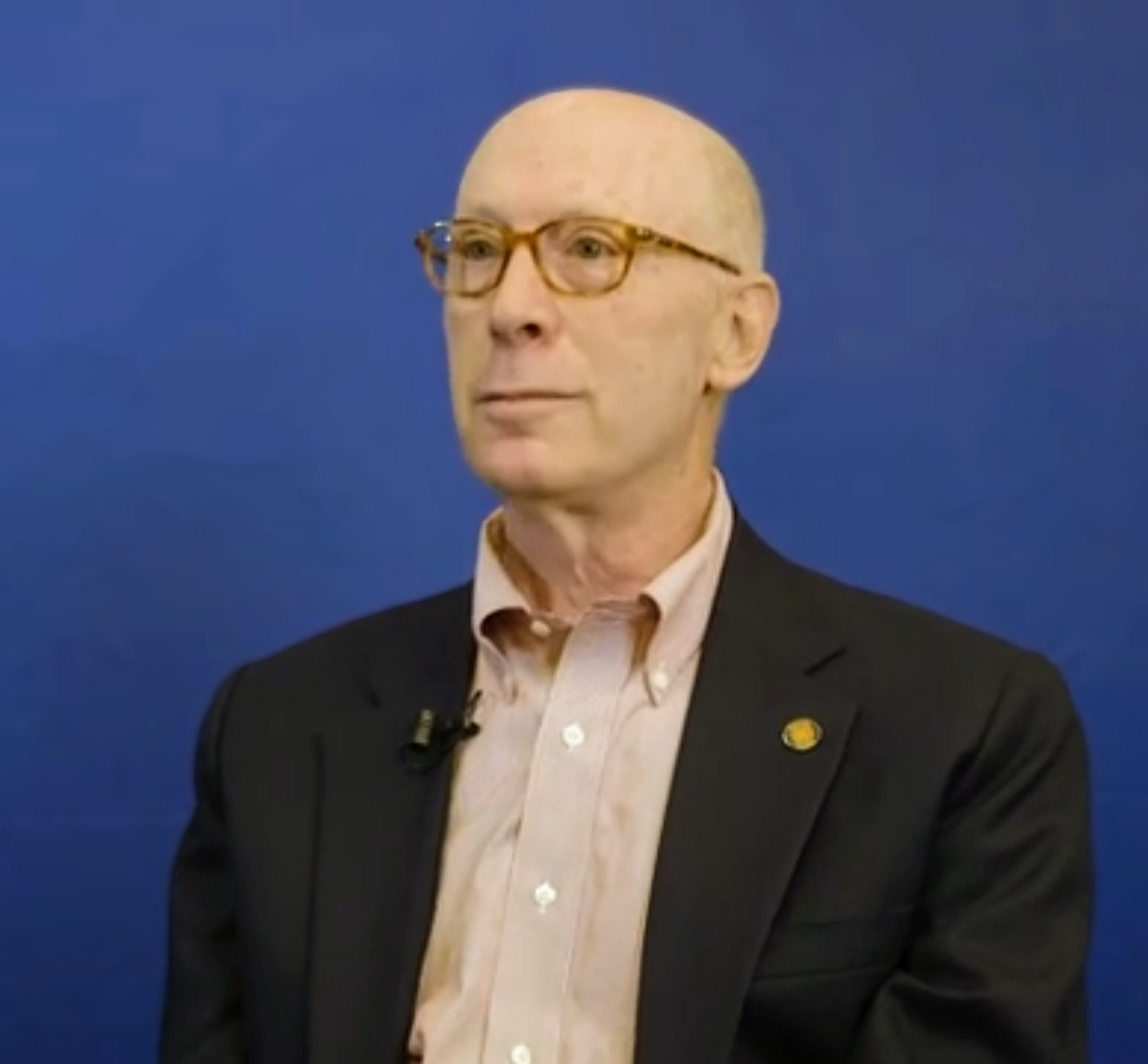
- Born: December 1948 (age 77)
- Education: Columbia University
- Employers: Columbia University; City University of New York; Princeton University; The Andrew W. Mellon Foundation; EDUCAUSE
- Known for: BITNET

Ira H. Fuchs (born December 1948) is the co-founder of BITNET, a precursor of the Internet. He was inducted into the Internet Hall of Fame in 2017. Since 2012 he has been President of BITNET, LLC a consulting firm specializing in online learning and other applications of technology in higher education.

== Career ==
Ira Fuchs graduated from the Columbia University School of Engineering and Applied Sciences in 1969 with a B.S. (Applied Physics) and in 1976 with a M.S. (Computer Science and Electrical Engineering). From 1973, at the age of 24, until 1980 he served as the first executive director of the University Computer Center at The City University of New York (CUNY) and then as CUNY's Vice Chancellor of University Systems until 1985.

With Greydon Freeman, Fuchs co-founded BITNET in 1981 by initially connecting CUNY and Yale University. In the mid-1980s BITNET connected millions of users from more than 1,400 institutions of higher education, government laboratories, and IBM's VNET network. It was the first academic computer network to connect the United States to Japan, Taiwan, Singapore, Israel, the USSR, and most of western Europe. Along with Daniel Oberst and Ricky Hernandez, Fuchs was co-inventor of LISTSERV, an electronic mailing list application. From 1984 until 1989 Mr. Fuchs was President of BITNET Inc. and from 1989 to 2003 he was President of the Corporation for Research and Educational Networking (CREN), a not-for-profit organization that operated the BITNET academic computer network, as well as the CSNET network.

From 1985 until 2000 Fuchs was vice president for Computing and Information Technology at Princeton University. In 1994, he was a co-founder of JSTOR, a not-for-profit organization dedicated to archiving and providing access to important scholarly journals. He served as the first Chief Scientist of JSTOR from 1994 to 2000.

From 2000 until 2010 he was vice president and Program Officer for Research in Information Technology at The Andrew W. Mellon Foundation, where he directed the Foundation's grant making in the area of digital technologies that can be applied to academic and administrative use in colleges and universities, libraries, museums, and arts organizations. Open source software initiatives supported by the Andrew W. Mellon Foundation include Sakai, uPortal, Kuali, Sophie, Chandler, Zotero, Open Knowledge Initiative, Bamboo, CollectionSpace, ConservationSpace, DecaPod, Fedora, SIMILE, DSpace, FLUID, OpenCast, SEASR, Visual Understanding Environment, and the Open Library Environment (OLE).

From 2010 until 2012 he was executive director of Next Generation Learning Challenges where he was responsible for the development and day-to-day operations of the program which provides grants, builds evidence, and develops an active community committed to identifying and scaling technology-enabled approaches that dramatically improve college readiness and completion.

Fuchs is currently a Director/Trustee of The Seeing Eye, and The Philadelphia Contributionship (the oldest property insurer in the US). He was also a Founding Trustee of JSTOR, USENIX, the Internet Society and a former Trustee of Mills College, Sarah Lawrence College, Princeton University Press, the Open Source Applications Foundation, Princeton Public Library (Princeton, NJ) (Treasurer), and the Global Education Learning Community.

== Selected publications ==
- — (March 2001). "Prospects and Possibilities of the Digital Age" (PDF). Proc. Am. Philos. Soc. 145 (1): 45–53. ISBN 1-4223-7275-8. JSTOR 1558324.
- — (June 1998). "The Promise and Challenge of New Technologies in Higher Education". Proc. Am. Philos. Soc. 142 (2): 191–206. ISBN 1-4223-7264-2. JSTOR 3152298.
- "Network Information is Not Free", Scholarly Publishing: The Electronic Frontier, Robin P. Peek and Gregory B. Newby, editors, Cambridge, MA, The MIT Press, 1996
- "Research Networks and Acceptable Use", Educom Bulletin, Vol 23, No.2/3, Summer/Fall 1988, pp 43–48
- Landweber, Lawrence H.; Jennings, Dennis M.; — (June 1986). "Research Computer Networks and Their Interconnection". IEEE Communications Magazine. 23 (6): 5–17. doi:10.1109/MCOM.1986.1093103. S2CID 43336384.
- Jennings, Dennis M.; Landweber, Lawrence H.; —; Farber, David J.; Adrion, W. Richards (February 28, 1986). "Computer Networking for Scientists". Science. 231 (4741): 943–950. Bibcode:1986Sci...231..943J. doi:10.1126/science.231.4741.943. JSTOR 1696954. PMID 17740290.
- — (March 1983). "BITNET – Because It's Time". Perspectives in Computing. 3 (1). IBM: 16–27.

== Awards ==
- Internet Hall of Fame, inducted 2017(Video)
- Indiana University's Thomas Hart Benton Mural Medallion - 2011 (Video)
- Educause- Excellence in Leadership 2010 (Award acknowledges leadership within higher education information technology)
- Educause- Excellence in Leadership 2000 (Highest professional award given to a CIO of an academic institution)
- Internet Innovator Award, Technology New Jersey Inc. 1999
