= Internet Hall of Fame =

Award administered by the Internet Society

- Awarded for: Visionaries, leaders and luminaries who have made significant contributions to the development and advancement of the global Internet.
- Date: Annual
- Country: United States
- Presented by: Internet Society
- First award: 2012
- Website: internethalloffame.org

The Internet Hall of Fame is an honorary lifetime achievement award administered by the Internet Society (ISOC) in recognition of individuals who have made significant contributions to the development and advancement of the Internet.

== Overview ==
The Internet Hall of Fame was established in 2012, on the 20th anniversary of ISOC. Its stated purpose is to "publicly recognize a distinguished and select group of visionaries, leaders and luminaries who have made significant contributions to the development and advancement of the global Internet".

Nominations may be made by anyone through an applications process. The Internet Hall of Fame Advisory Board is responsible for the final selection of inductees. The advisory board is made up of professionals in the Internet industry.

== History ==
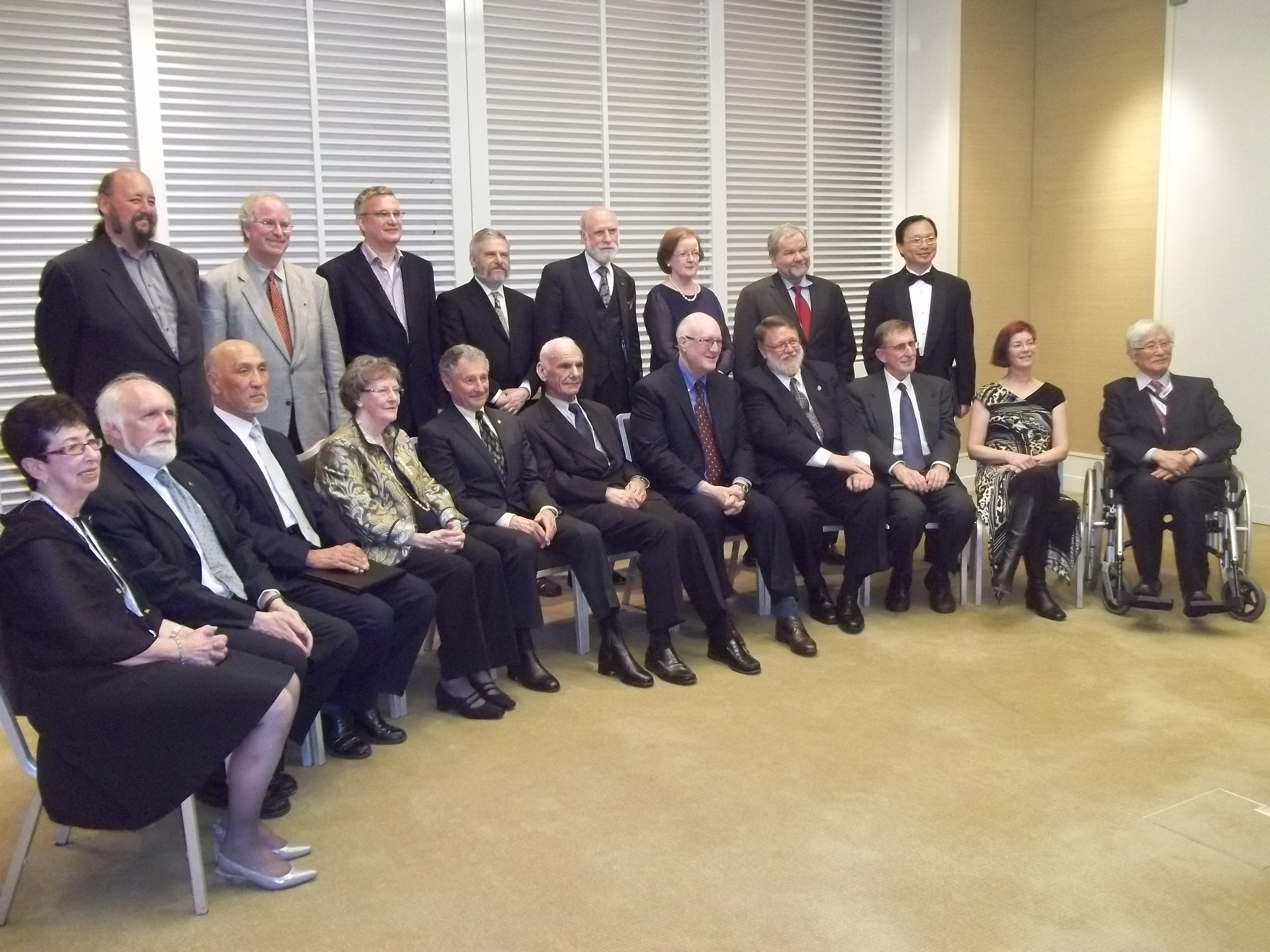
Inaugural inductees, 2012

In 2012, there were 33 inaugural inductees into the Hall of Fame, announced on April 23, 2012, at the Internet Society's Global INET conference in Geneva, Switzerland.

There were 32 inductees in 2013. They were announced on June 26, 2013, and the induction ceremony was held on August 3, 2013, in Berlin, Germany. The ceremony was originally to be held in Istanbul, but the venue was changed due to the ongoing government protests in Turkey.

The class of 2014 inducted 24 people. They were announced at an event in Hong Kong.

There were no inductees in 2015 or 2016, while the ISOC worked to create an Advisory Board to provide leadership on the program's direction. This Advisory Board would be responsible for the selection of the inductees going forward.

On September 18, 2017, the Internet Society gathered to honor the fourth class of Internet Hall of Fame Inductees at UCLA, where nearly 50 years before, the first electronic message was sent over the Internet's predecessor, the ARPANET.

On September 27, 2019, 11 new members were inducted into the Internet Hall of Fame in a ceremony in San Jose, Costa Rica. The inductees included Larry Irving, the first African-American to be inducted.

In February 2021, the Internet Hall of Fame announced that nominations were open for 2021 inductees until April 23, 2021, which was later extended to May 7, 2021.

== Inductees ==
From 2012 to 2017, inductees were considered in three categories:

- Pioneers: "Individuals who were instrumental in the early design and development of the Internet."
- Global Connectors: "Individuals from around the world who have made significant contributions to the global growth and use of the Internet."
- Innovators: "Individuals who made outstanding technological, commercial, or policy advances and helped to expand the Internet's reach."

An asterisk (*) indicates a posthumous recipient. Since 2019, inductees are not assigned categories.

=== Pioneers ===
2012

- (Poland) Paul Baran^{*}
- (United States) Vint Cerf
- (Israel) Danny Cohen
- (United States) Steve Crocker
- (United Kingdom) Donald Davies^{*}
- (United States) Elizabeth J. Feinler
- (United States) Charles Herzfeld^{*}
- (United States) Robert Kahn
- (United Kingdom) Peter Kirstein
- (United States) Leonard Kleinrock
- (United States) John Klensin
- (United States) Jon Postel^{*}
- (France) Louis Pouzin
- (United States) Lawrence Roberts

2013

- (United States) David Clark
- (United States) David Farber
- (United States) Howard Frank
- (Thailand) Kanchana Kanchanasut
- (United States) J.C.R. Licklider^{*}
- (United States) Bob Metcalfe
- (Japan) Jun Murai
- (Netherlands) Kees Neggers
- (Ghana) Nii Quaynor
- (United States) Glenn Ricart
- (United States) Robert Taylor
- (United States) Stephen Wolff
- (Germany) Werner Zorn

2014

- (United States) Douglas Engelbart^{*}
- (United States) Susan Estrada
- (United States) Frank Heart^{*}
- (Republic of Ireland) Dennis Jennings
- (Norway) Rolf Nordhagen^{*}
- (United States) Radia Perlman

=== Global connectors ===
2012

- (United States) Randy Bush
- (South Korea) Kilnam Chon
- (United States) Al Gore
- (South Africa) Nancy Hafkin
- (Australia) Geoff Huston
- (United States) Brewster Kahle
- (Germany) Daniel Karrenberg
- (Japan) Toru Takahashi
- (Singapore) Tan Tin Wee

2013

- (United Kingdom) Karen Banks
- (Sri Lanka) Gihan Dias
- (South Africa) Anriette Esterhuysen
- (United States) Steve Goldstein
- (Netherlands) Teus Hagen
- (Uruguay) Ida Holz
- (China) Qiheng Hu
- (Japan) Haruhisa Ishida^{*}
- (United States) Barry Leiner^{*}
- (Russia) (United States) George Sadowsky

2014

- (United Kingdom) Dai Davies
- (Brazil) Demi Getschko
- (Japan) Masaki Hirabaru^{*}
- (Netherlands) Erik Huizer
- (United States) Steve Huter
- (Sri Lanka) Abhaya Induruwa
- (Kenya) Dorcas Muthoni
- (Nepal) Mahabir Pun
- (India) Srinivasan Ramani
- (United States) Michael Roberts
- (United Kingdom) (Switzerland) Ben Segal
- (United States) Douglas Van Houweling

2017

- (Lebanon) Nabil Bukhalid
- (United States) Ira Fuchs
- (Japan) Shigeki Goto
- (South Africa) Mike Jensen
- (Venezuela) Ermanno Pietrosemoli
- (Brazil) Tadao Takahashi
- (Chile) Florencio Utreras
- (China) Jianping Wu

=== Innovators ===
2012

- (United States) Mitchell Baker
- (United Kingdom) Tim Berners-Lee
- (Belgium) Robert Cailliau
- (United States) Van Jacobson
- (United States) Lawrence Landweber
- (United States) Paul Mockapetris
- (United States) Craig Newmark
- (United States) Raymond Tomlinson
- (Finland) (United States) Linus Torvalds
- (United States) Philip Zimmermann

2013

- (United States) Marc Andreessen
- (United States) John Perry Barlow
- (France) François Flückiger
- (United States) Stephen Kent
- (Sweden) Anne-Marie Eklund Löwinder
- (Germany) Henning Schulzrinne
- (United States) Richard Stallman
- (United States) Aaron Swartz^{*}
- (United States) Jimmy Wales

2014

- (United States) Eric Allman
- (United States) Eric Bina
- (Germany) Karlheinz Brandenburg
- (United States) John Cioffi
- (China) Hualin Qian
- (United States) Paul Vixie

2017

- (Netherlands) Jaap Akkerhuis
- (United States) Yvonne Marie Andrés
- (Barbados) (Canada) Alan Emtage
- (United States) Ed Krol
- (United States) Tracy LaQuey Parker
- (United States) Craig Partridge

=== Inductees since 2019 ===
2019

- (Togo) Adiel Akplogan
- (United States) Kimberly Claffy
- (United States) Douglas Comer
- (United States) Elise Gerich
- (United States) Larry Irving
- (United States) Daniel C. Lynch
- (United States) Jean Armour Polly
- (Peru) José Soriano
- (Brazil) Michael Stanton
- (Netherlands) Klaas Wierenga
- (Japan) Suguru Yamaguchi^{*}

2021

- (Brazil) (Canada) Carlos Afonso
- (Netherlands) Rob Blokzijl^{*}
- (United States) Hans-Werner Braun
- (Denmark) Frode Greisen
- (Czech Republic) Jan Gruntorád
- (United States) Saul Hahn
- (United States) Kim Hubbard
- (El Salvador) Rafael (Lito) Ibarra
- (China) Xing Li
- (Norway) Yngvar G. Lundh^{*}
- (United States) Dan Kaminsky^{*}
- (South Korea) DaeYoung Kim
- (United States) Kenneth J. Klingenstein
- (Mexico) Alejandro Pisanty
- (United States) Yakov Rekhter
- (Australia) Philip Smith
- (Norway) Pål Spilling^{*}
- (Brazil) Liane Tarouco
- (United States) Virginia Travers
- (United States) George Varghese
- (United States) Lixia Zhang

2023

- (India) Abhay Bhushan
- (United States) Laura Breeden
- (Brazil) Ivan Moura Campos
- (United States) Steve Cisler
- (Australia) Peter Eckersley^{*}
- (Brazil) Hartmut Richard Glaser
- (United States) Simon S. Lam
- (United States) William L. Schrader
- (Costa Rica) (France) Guy de Téramond Peralta

2025

- (Sweden) Patrik Fältström
- (Egypt) Tarek Kamel*
- (China) Dong Liu
- (United States) Kirk Lougheed
- (United States) Ram Mohan
- (South Korea) Hyunje Park
- (United States) Joyce K. Reynolds*
- (United States) John Quarterman

== Advisory board ==
2012

- Lishan Adam
- Joi Ito
- Mark Mahaney
- Chris Anderson
- Mike Jensen
- Alejandro Pisanty
- Alex Corenthin
- Aleks Krotoski
- Lee Rainie
- William H. Dutton
- Loïc Le Meur

2013 and 2014

- Lishan Adam
- Raúl Echeberría
- C.L. Liu
- Hessa Al Jaber
- Hartmut Glaser
- Alejandro Pisanty
- Grace Chng
- Katie Hafner
- Oliver Popov
- Alex Corenthin
- Mike Jensen
- Lee Rainie
- William H. Dutton
- Aleks Krotoski
- Andreu Veà Baró

2017

- Randy Bush
- Steven Huter
- Srinivasan Ramani
- Kilnam Chon
- Abhaya Induruwa
- Glenn Ricart
- Gihan Dias
- Dennis Jennings
- Lawrence Roberts
- Anriette Esterhuysen
- John Klensin
- George Sadowsky
- Susan Estrada
- Lawrence Landweber
- Douglas Van Houweling
- Demi Getschko
- Paul Mockapetris
- Paul Vixie
- Nancy Hafkin
- Radia Perlman

== See also ==
- IEEE Internet Award
- Internet celebrity
- List of Internet pioneers
- SIGCOMM Award
