= Mike Stanton =

Mike Stanton may refer to:

- Mike Stanton (right-handed pitcher) (born 1952), right-handed pitcher in Major League Baseball, played 1975–1985
- Mike Stanton (left-handed pitcher) (born 1967), left-handed relief pitcher in Major League Baseball, played 1989–2007
- Giancarlo Stanton (born 1989), formerly referred to as Mike Stanton, outfielder in Major League Baseball, played 2010–present
- Michael Stanton, British-Brazilian computer scientist
