= Ben Segal =

Ben Segal may refer to:

- Ben Segal (computer scientist), British-Swiss computer scientist
- Judah Segal, known as Ben, professor of Semitic Languages
