= Haruhisa Ishida =

Japanese computer scientist (1936–2009)

- Japanese: 石田晴久
- Haruhisa Ishida in 1980
- Born: 30 October 1936; Taiwan
- Died: 9 March 2009 (aged 72)
- Education: University of Tokyo
- Awards: Internet Hall of Fame (2013)
- Scientific career
- Fields: Internet

Haruhisa Ishida (Japanese: 石田晴久) (30 October 1936 – 9 March 2009) was a Japanese Internet pioneer, information scientist, and university teacher. He was the head of Japan Network Information Center and the Japanese chapter of the Internet Society. Ishida also served as the director of the computer center at the University of Tokyo.

He has authored and translated books and authored and co-authored a number of scientific publications.

== Biography ==
Haruhisa Ishida was born in Taiwan in 1936.

He graduated from the University of Iowa in 1964, where he received his PhD. His dissertation was titled Generalized learning network using adaptive threshold elements.

Ishida is credited with introducing the Internet to Japan, elucidating its vast potential for online work and facilitating accessibility to UNIX computing.

Ishida died on 9 March 2009. A prominent figure in the history of the Japanese Internet, he was named by Toru Takahashi and Jun Murai.

He was posthumously inducted into the Internet Hall of Fame in 2013.

== See also ==
- List of Internet pioneers

== Selected publications ==
- 『UNIX』共立出版、1983
- 『FORTRAN77システムの使い方』石田晴久編、東京大学出版会、1984
- 『MS-DOS』産業図書、1986
- 『プログラミング言語C』共立出版、1981(translated from The C Programming Language)
- 『Cプログラミング入門』共立出版、1988
- 『OS/2』鷹野澄との共著、共立出版、1990
- 『UNIX最前線』共立出版、1993
- 『入門ANSI-C』石田晴久ほか著、実教出版、1993
- 『実戦Windows 98入門』岩波書店、1998
- 『Windowsパソコン入門』岩波書店、1999
- 『PC-UNIX』石田晴久ほか著、実教出版、2001
