= Hu Qiheng =

Internet pioneer

- 胡启恒
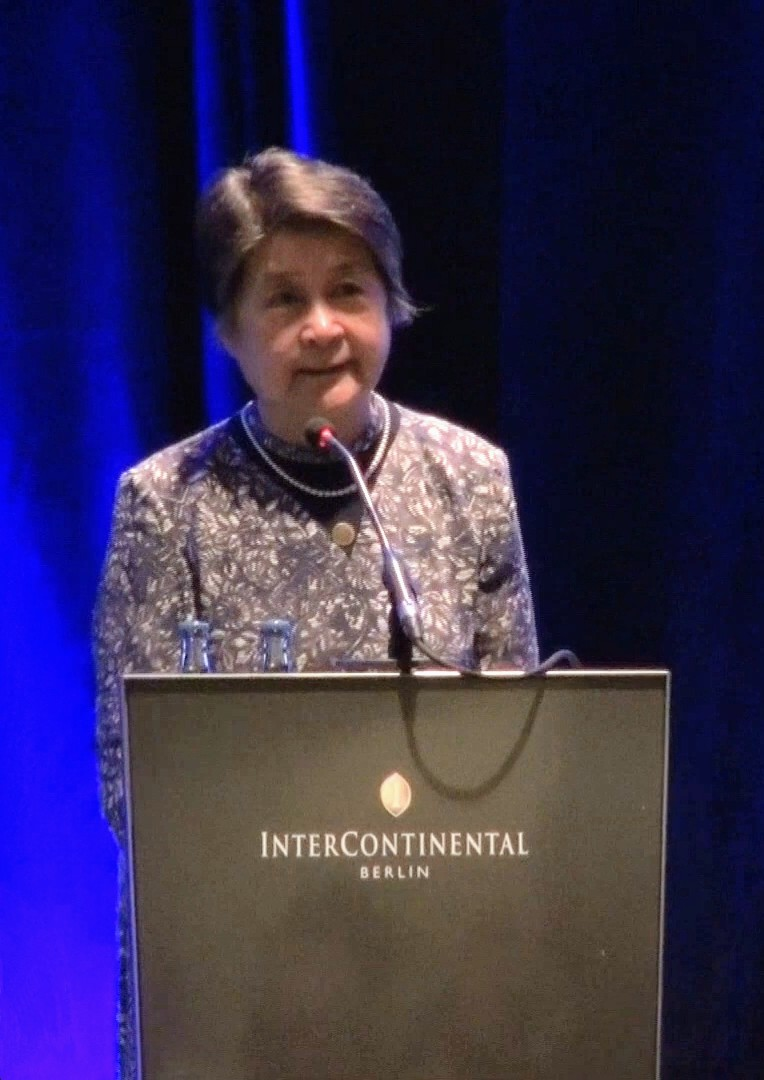
- Hu in 2013
- Born: June 15, 1934 (age 92); Beijing, China
- Education: Moscow Institute of Chemical Machinery
- Awards: Internet Hall of Fame (2013)
- Scientific career
- Fields: Pattern recognition
- Workplaces: Chinese Academy of Sciences

Chinese name
- Simplified Chinese: 胡启恒
- Traditional Chinese: 胡啟恆
Transcriptions
Standard Mandarin
- Hanyu Pinyin: Hú Qǐhéng

Hu Qiheng (born 1934) is a Chinese computer scientist. Hu was the vice president of the Chinese Academy of Sciences from 1987 to 1996 and led the National Computing and Networking Facility of China, which connected China to the Internet in April 1994. Hu was inducted into the Internet Hall of Fame in 2013 as a global connector.

Hu was a member of the 8th and 9th National Committee of the Chinese People's Political Consultative Conference.

== Early life and education ==
Hu was born in 1934 in Beijing, China, while her ancestral home in Yulin, Shaanxi. She graduated from the Moscow Institute of Chemical Machinery in 1963 with an associate's degree in healthcare.

== Career ==
Starting in the 1980s, Hu was the director of the Institute of Automation, Chinese Academy of Sciences from 1983 to 1987. After being named secretary general of the Chinese Academy of Sciences in 1987, she became the academy's vice president in 1988 and held the position until 1996. During her time as vice president, Hu was in charge of the National Computing and Networking Facility of China. She persuaded the National Science Foundation to allow China to connect to the Internet. Her discussions with the institution's officials led to a consensus that finally allowed the installation of the first TCP/IP connection in China on April 20, 1994.

After her position of vice president at the Chinese Academy of Sciences ended in 1996, Hu established the China Internet Network Information Center in 1997 and co-founded the Internet Society of China in 2001. As president of the Internet Society of China, Hu advocated for Internet installment in the outskirts of China. In 2004, Hu was named as a member of the Working Group on Internet Governance held by the United Nations.

Hu is also among the pioneers in the field of mode identification and artificial intelligence (AI) in China. She helped establish the Knowledge and Intelligence Science Laboratory and served as president of the China Automation Society and the China Computer Society.

== Awards and honors ==
Hu was inducted into the Internet Hall of Fame as a global connector in 2013.

== Personal life ==
Hu is married with two children.

Her brother Hu Qili was the first secretary of the CCP Secretariat from 1985 to 1989 and a member of the CCP Politburo Standing Committee from 1987 to 1989.

Non-profit organization positions
New title	President of the Internet Society of China; 2001–2013	Succeeded by Wu Hequan
