= Jean Armour Polly =

American librarian

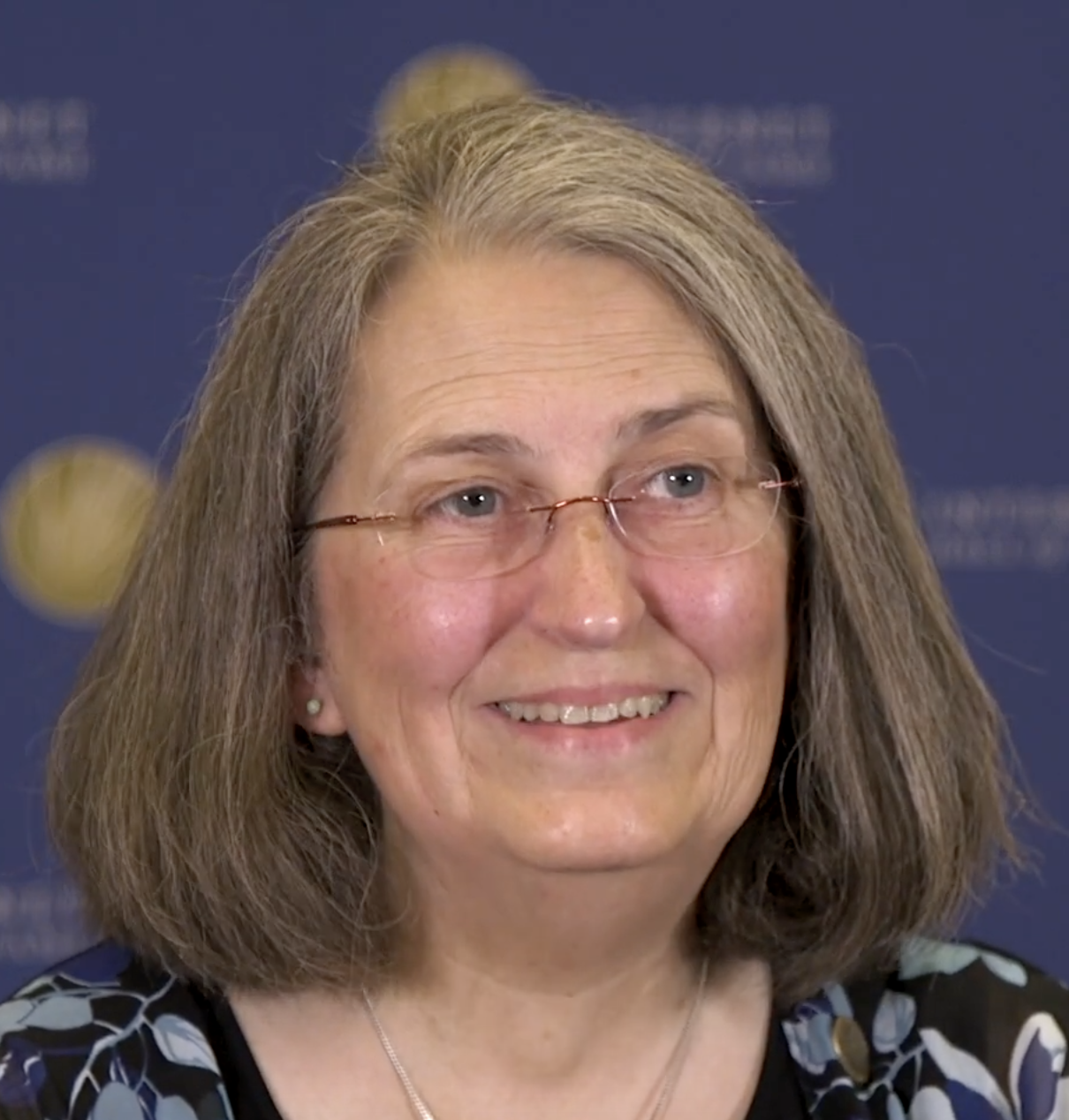
Polly in 2019

Jean Armour Polly is an American librarian and the author of an early series of books on safe Internet services, Surfing the Internet. In 2019, she was inducted into the Internet Hall of Fame.

== Education ==
Polly received her BA in Medieval Studies at Syracuse University in 1974, and her Master's in Library Science from the same university in 1975. She was a key person in popularizing the phrase "surfing the Internet", being the author of an article called "Surfing the INTERNET", published in the University of Minnesota Wilson Library Bulletin in June 1992 though others had also used the phrase previously.

Polly has been an active Internet user since 1991. She was Director of Public Services and Internet Ambassador at NYSERNet, Inc (1992–1995). Polly has served on the Internet Society Board of Trustees (1993–1996) and on the ICANN At-Large Advisory Council (ALAC) (2004–2006), as well as on the board of ICRA.

== Publications ==
Polly is the author of the well-known series of books The Internet Kids & Families Yellow Pages. Because of her long-standing work, devoted to family- and child-related issues on the Internet, Polly is often referred to as one of the original "Mothers" of the Internet.

== Personal life ==
Polly lives near Syracuse, New York, where she runs the "Net-mom" Internet site. She has one son, Stephen.
