= Stephen Kent (network security) =

American computer scientist

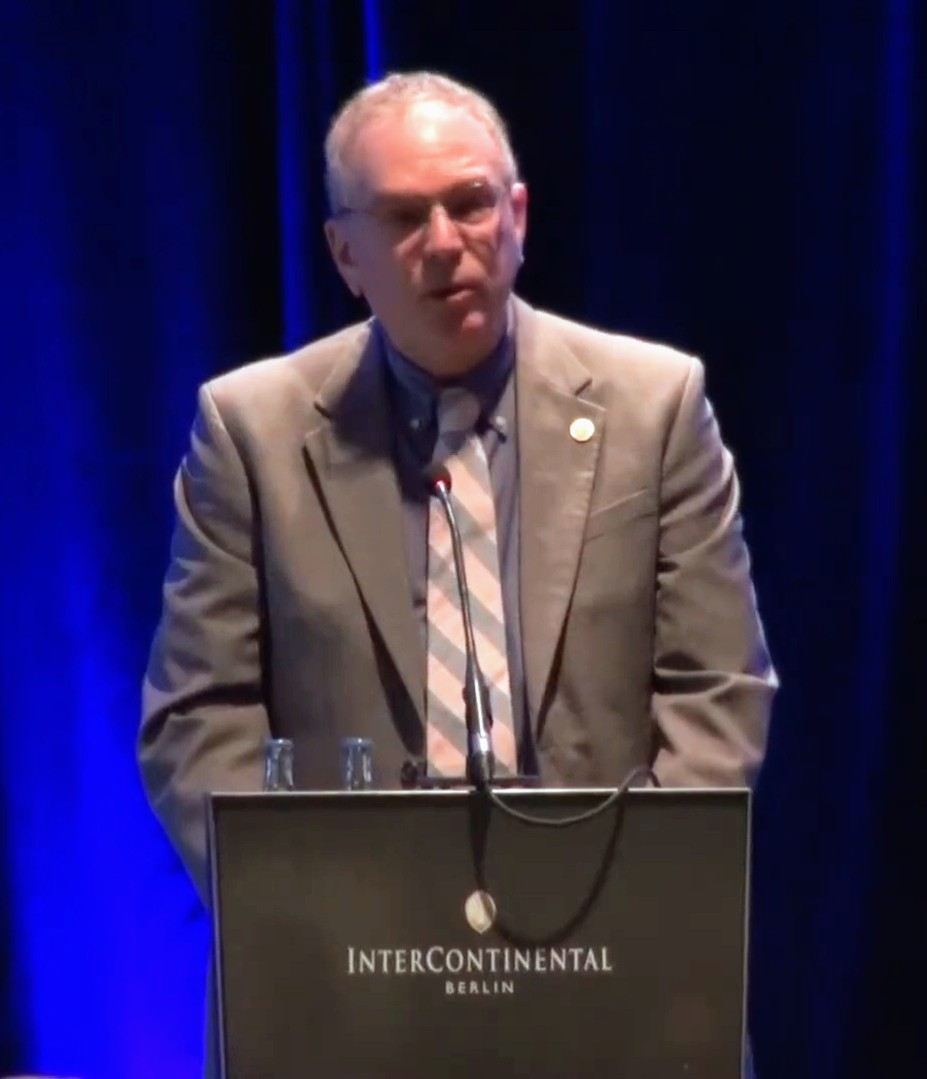
- Born: January 25, 1951 (age 75)

Stephen Thomas Kent (born January 25, 1951) is an American computer scientist, noted for his contributions to network security.

Kent was born in New Orleans, Louisiana. In 1969 he graduated from Ridgewood Preparatory School in Metairie, Louisiana, and in 1973 from Loyola University New Orleans with a B.S. degree in mathematics. From 1973 to 1974 he attended Tulane University as graduate student in mathematics, then moved to the Massachusetts Institute of Technology as a graduate student in computer science from 1974 to 1980. He received his master's degree from MIT in 1976, and his PhD in 1980.

While a graduate student, Kent spent two summers at BBN Technologies, which he joined full-time in 1980 after receiving his doctorate degree. He ultimately became BBN's Chief Scientist for Security Technologies. Kent is best known for his role in developing Internet standards. He served as a member of the Internet Architecture Board (1983–1994), and chaired the Privacy and Security Research Group of the Internet Research Task Force (1985–1998) and the Privacy Enhanced Mail (PEM) working group of the Internet Engineering Task Force (IETF) from 1990 to 1995, during which time he also co-chaired the Public Key Infrastructure Working Group. In 1988, he was the primary author of the "core" IPsec standards, which he continued improving in 2005. He was also active in efforts to secure the Border Gateway Protocol. He also chaired the Federal Advisory Committee to Develop a FIPS for Federal Key Management Infrastructure (1996–1998), and was active in a number of National Research Council studies.

Kent is an ACM Fellow and a member of the Internet Society. He was inducted into the Internet Hall of Fame in 2013, where he is recognized as "a pioneer in the architecture of network security systems, including the design and development of network layer encryption and access-control systems and standards; secure transport layer protocols; secure e-mail technology; Public Key Infrastructure standards and certification authority systems." In 2026 he was elected to the National Academy of Engineering.
