= Kanchana Kanchanasut =

Thai computer scientist and Internet pioneer

- กาญจนา กาญจนสุต
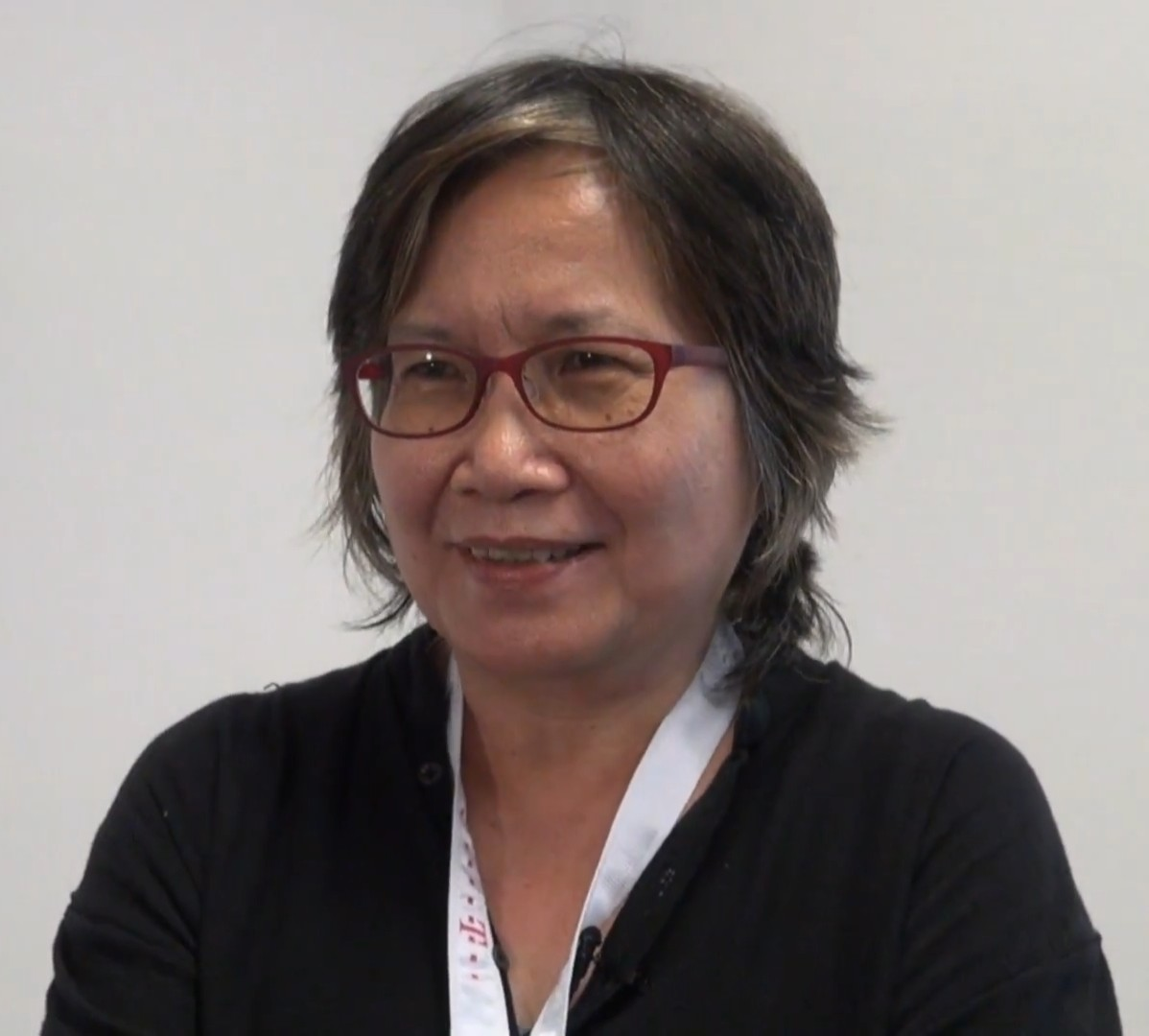
- Kanchana in 2013
- Education: University of Queensland; University of Melbourne
- Awards: Internet Hall of Fame, 2013; Postel Award, 2016
- Scientific career
- Fields: Computer science
- Workplaces: Asian Institute of Technology

Kanchana Kanchanasut (Thai: กาญจนา กาญจนาสุต) is a Thai computer scientist and professor at the Asian Institute of Technology who became the first Thai person to use email. She hosted the first server in Thailand connected to the Internet and registered Thailand's country code top-level domain .th in 1988. Kanchanasut was inducted into the Internet Hall of Fame in 2013.

== Early life and education ==
Kanchanasut graduated from the University of Queensland in 1974 with a Bachelor of Science in mathematics and an additional diploma in computer science. She moved on to the University of Melbourne in 1979 to complete a Master of Science and later returned to Melbourne for a Doctor of Philosophy in 1991.

== Career ==
After completing her studies at the University of Melbourne in 1984, she began her career at the Asian Institute of Technology. While at the AIT, Kanchanasut became the first Thai person to use email in 1986 after she co-created a computer network to email universities in Melbourne and Tokyo. After establishing connections to the universities in 1987, Kanchanasut set up Thailand's first server connected to the Internet in 1988. Kanchanasut was elected as the AIT's vice president of research in 2013 and currently teaches computer science.

Outside of her work at the AIT, Kanchanasut registered the country code top-level domain .th for Thailand as a computer administrator in 1988. In 2016, she co-led the creation of the first internet exchange point in Bangkok.

== Awards and honours ==
In 2013, Kanchanasut was inducted into the Internet Hall of Fame. In 2016, she was awarded the Jonathan B. Postel Service Award.
