= George Sadowsky =

American computer scientist

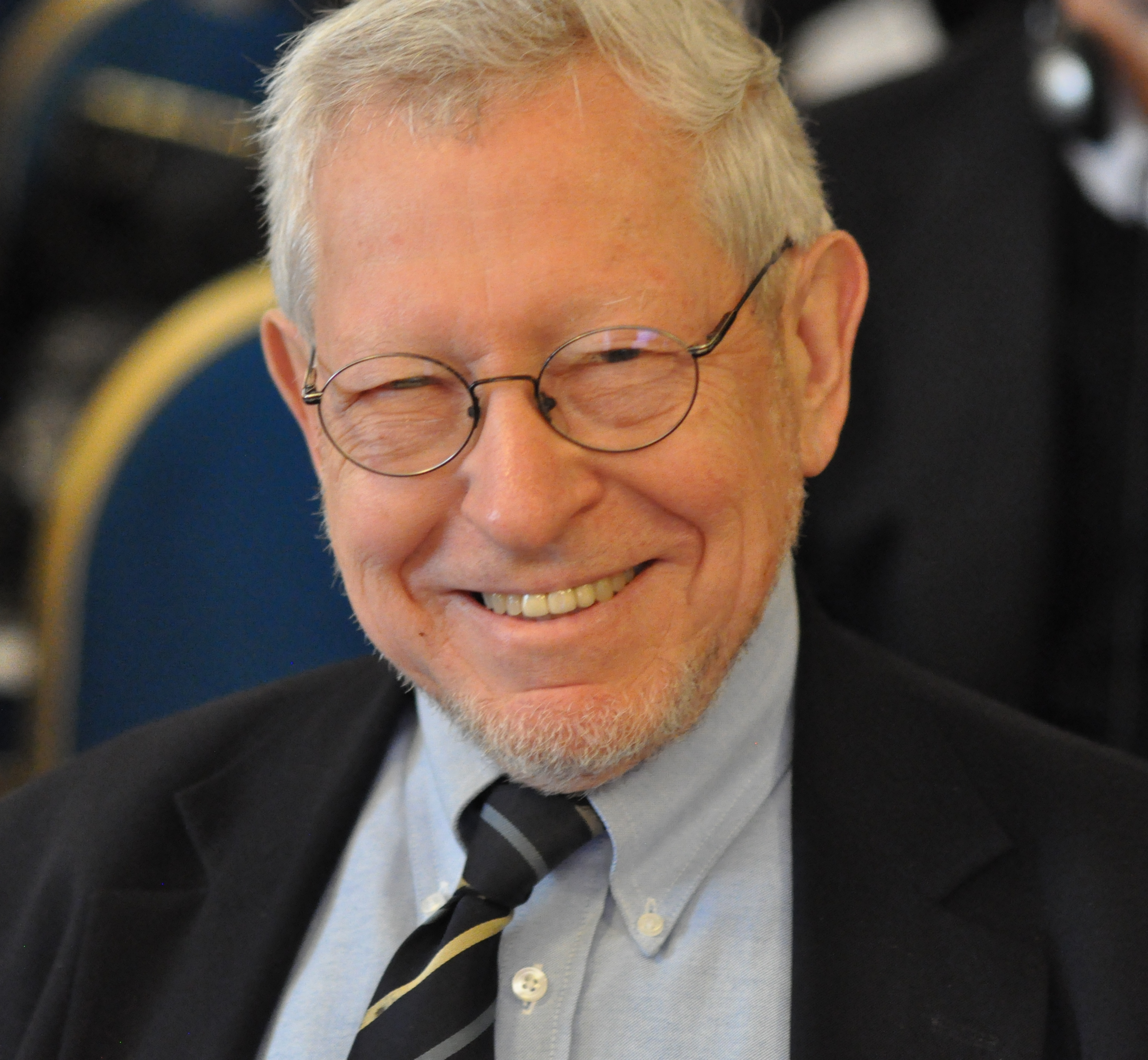
- George Sadowsky in Garmisch, Germany, during cybersecurity conference in 2010
- Born: September 30, 1936 (age 89); Novocherkassk, Soviet Union
- Education: Harvard University

George Sadowsky (born September 30, 1936) is an American computer scientist who has worked in a number of entities related to promotion of the Internet worldwide.

He is known through his decades of work with developing countries. In many of these countries, he was the one to actually bring the Internet, or make it affordable, or help change the legislation to make sure it minimized government control and regulation.

On August 3, 2013, Sadowsky was inducted into the Internet Hall of Fame as a Global Connector.

On November 9, 2022, he was presented the Johnathan B. Postel award at IETF meeting 115.

== Education ==
- 1953–1957 Harvard College, majored in mathematics, A.B. 1957.
- 1957–1958 Harvard University, graduate study in mathematics
- 1963–1966 Yale University, graduate study in economics, M.A. 1965, Ph.D. 1988

== Career ==
Sadowsky's first work was at Combustion Engineering, Inc. (1958–1962), where he was an applied mathematician and programmer for the Nuclear Division. He then went to Yale University (1962–1963), where he was Manager of Operations of Yale Computer Center and Research Assistant in Economics.

For three years (1962–1965), while in graduate school at Yale, Sadowsky was a consultant to government agencies and research projects, e.g. he introduced the use of computers for revenue estimation in the Office of Tax Analysis of the U. S. Treasury Department and developed a large computer-based microanalytic simulation model to analyze the revenue and distributional effects of preliminary versions of the Revenue Act of 1964.

He then went to the Brookings Institution (1966–1970), where he served as director of the Computer Center and was a senior fellow at the same time.

The next three years Sadowsky spent at The Urban Institute as a senior research staff member.

In 1973 he joined the United Nations, where he worked until 1986 as technical adviser in Computer Methods and concurrently as adviser to the director of the Statistical Office. He also performed occasional consulting work for government, research and social service agencies.

In 1986 Sadowsky moved to Northwestern University, where he was a director for academic computing and network services until 1990.

The next ten years, until 2000, Sadowsky was working at the New York University as a director of networking services and as director of Academic Computing Facility.

In 2001, he became executive director of the GIPI project, Global Internet Policy Initiative.

== Boards ==
Sadowsky served as chair of the nominating committee at Internet Corporation for Assigned Names and Numbers (ICANN), 2005.

He is a member of the board of directors and secretary for the Digital Policy Institute.

Like Vint Cerf, Sadowsky served as a member of Bulgarian President Georgi Parvanov's IT Advisory Council from March 2002 till January 2012.

Sadowsky was a member of the Election Committee of the Internet Society, 2005–2006.

He also serves on the Board of Directors of Peoplink, and he is a member of the Board of Advisers of Bridge to Asia.

Sadowsky served on the board of trustees of the Internet Society during 1996–1999, 2000–2004 and again in 2020–2022.

In August 2009 Sadowsky was appointed to serve on the ICANN board. He was reelected to this board again in 2012 and 2015, and his last term ended in October 2018.
