= Tadao Takahashi =

Brazilian computer scientist (1950–2022)

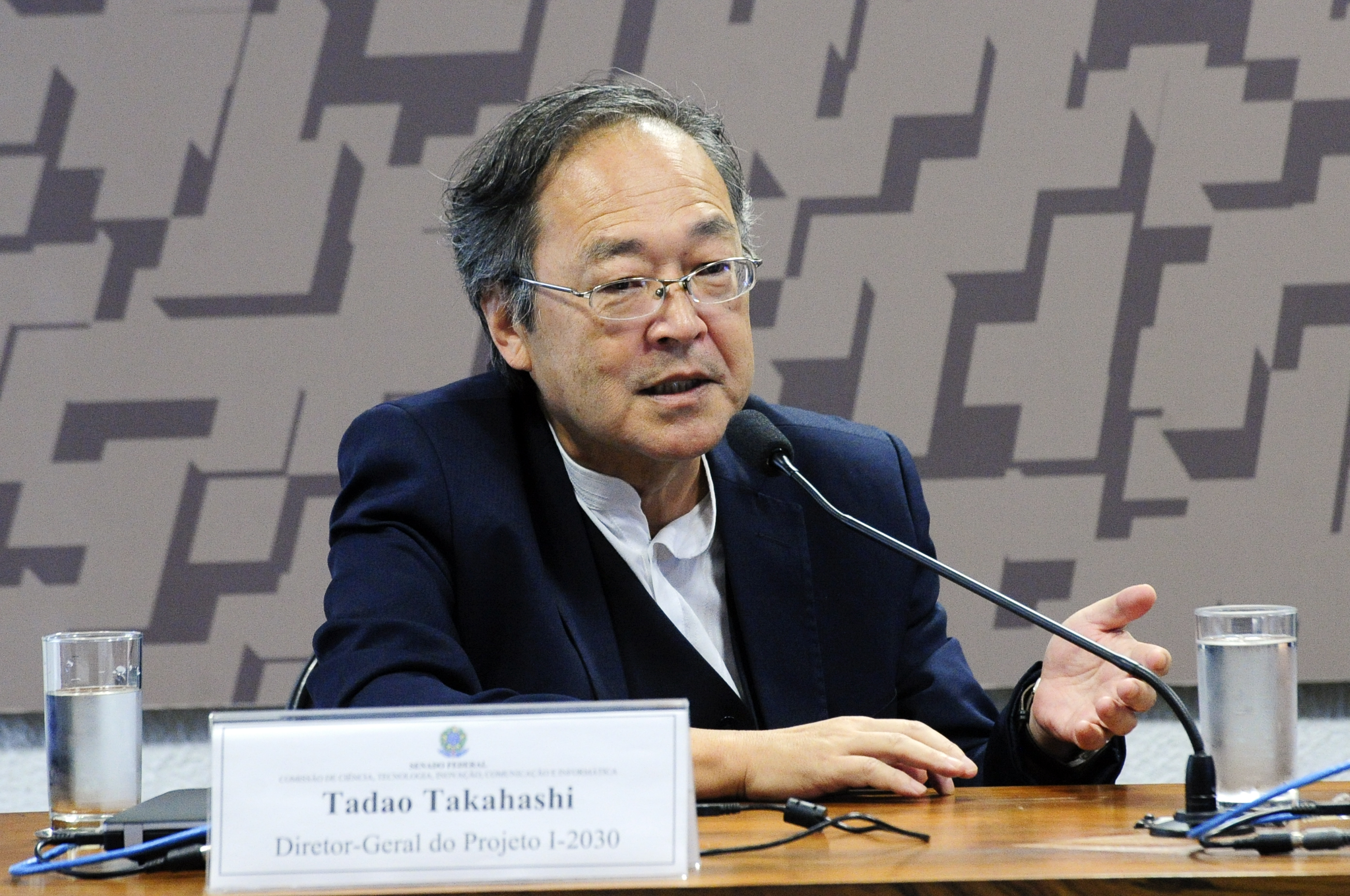
- Born: 16 December 1950; Marília, Brazil
- Died: 6 April 2022 (aged 71); Campinas, Brazil
- Education: University of Campinas, Pontifical Catholic University of Campinas, and Tokyo Institute of Technology
- Occupation: Computer science researcher

Eduardo Tadao Takahashi (16 December 1950 – 6 April 2022) was a Brazilian computer scientist and researcher who was credited with contributions toward planning, deployment, and adoption of the internet in Brazil and other Latin American countries. He was a founding director of Brazil's National Research Network (RNP), an academic network that coordinated actions toward setting up the country's national internet backbone. He was inducted into the Internet Hall of Fame in 2017.

== Biography ==
Takahashi was the founder and the first director of the National Research Network (RNP), a Brazilian academic network that in the early days of the internet coordinated with other national academic networks to form what would become the backbone of the global internet and the foundation for Brazilian internet. At the RNP, he advanced an inclusive and bottom-up approach to network management that was one of the earliest models for global internet governance before the model developed by the Internet Corporation for Assigned Names and Numbers (ICANN). He was associated with the organization from 1989 to 1996.

Takahashi was also the founder and chair of the National Program for the Information Society (SOCINFO), a Brazilian initiative to expand the penetration of the internet in key sectors, including healthcare, education, and government services. He also advanced key Information and communications technology policy initiatives of multilateral bodies including the United Nations, World Economic Forum, and the European Commission, towards promoting the uptake of internet within Brazil as a contributor to its social and economic development. In his contributions towards enabling internet access in some of the most remote regions of Latin America, he was noted to have even negotiated with drug lords to seek their permission to install equipment in order to enable internet access in areas controlled by them. He was a member of Brazil's Internet Steering Committee between 1995 and 1996, and later from 1999 to 2002. He was also a member of the ICANN's membership advisory committee in 1999.

Takahashi was inducted into the Internet Hall of Fame as a global connector in 2017. He held degrees in computer science, social communication, and informatics from University of Campinas, Pontifical Catholic University of Campinas, and Tokyo Institute of Technology in Japan, respectively.

Takahashi died in Campinas on 6 April 2022, aged 71, from a heart attack.
