= Werner Zorn =

German computer scientist

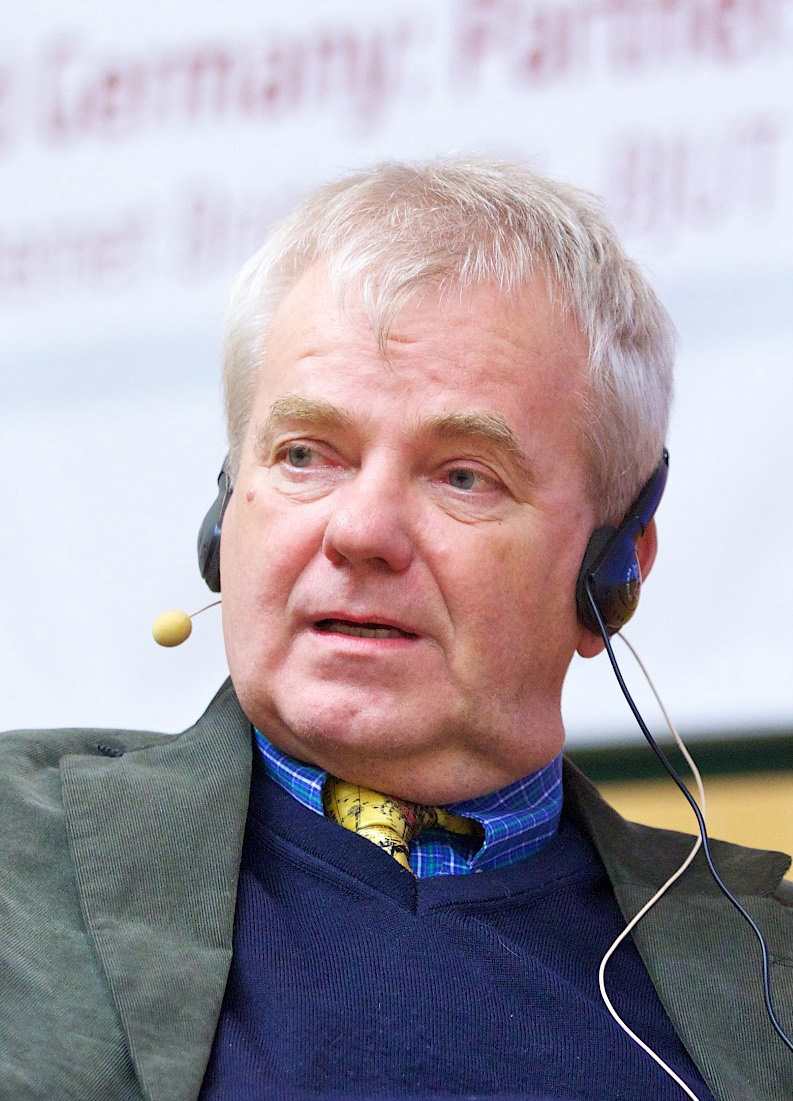
Werner Zorn

Werner Zorn (born 24 September 1942, in Frankfurt am Main) is a German computer scientist and Internet pioneer.

From 2001 to 2007, he was a professor of communication systems at the Hasso Plattner Institute at the University of Potsdam, previously working at the Karlsruhe Institute of Technology as the head of a computer center and a professor.

== Life ==
Zorn, who was the son of professor Erich Zorn, attended primary school in Bad Soden from 1949 to 1953, then the Leibniz Realgymnasium in Frankfurt. After graduating in 1962, he studied at the University of Karlsruhe (TH), specializing in communications engineering and graduated with a degree in engineering in 1967. He then earned his doctorate, with his instructor being Karl Steinbuch, with the thesis Setting method for linear and non-linear classifiers (German: Einstellverfahren für lineare und nichtlineare Klassifikatoren) in the field of character recognition.

In 1972, he moved to the newly founded Department of Computer Science of the University of Karlsruhe (TH), where he was responsible for the development, operation and further development of the Informatik-Rechnerabteilung (IRA) data center for 25 years. After his appointment as a professor in 1979, he chose the topics of methodological performance analysis and data communication as one of his main fields, which he has continued to pursue ever since.

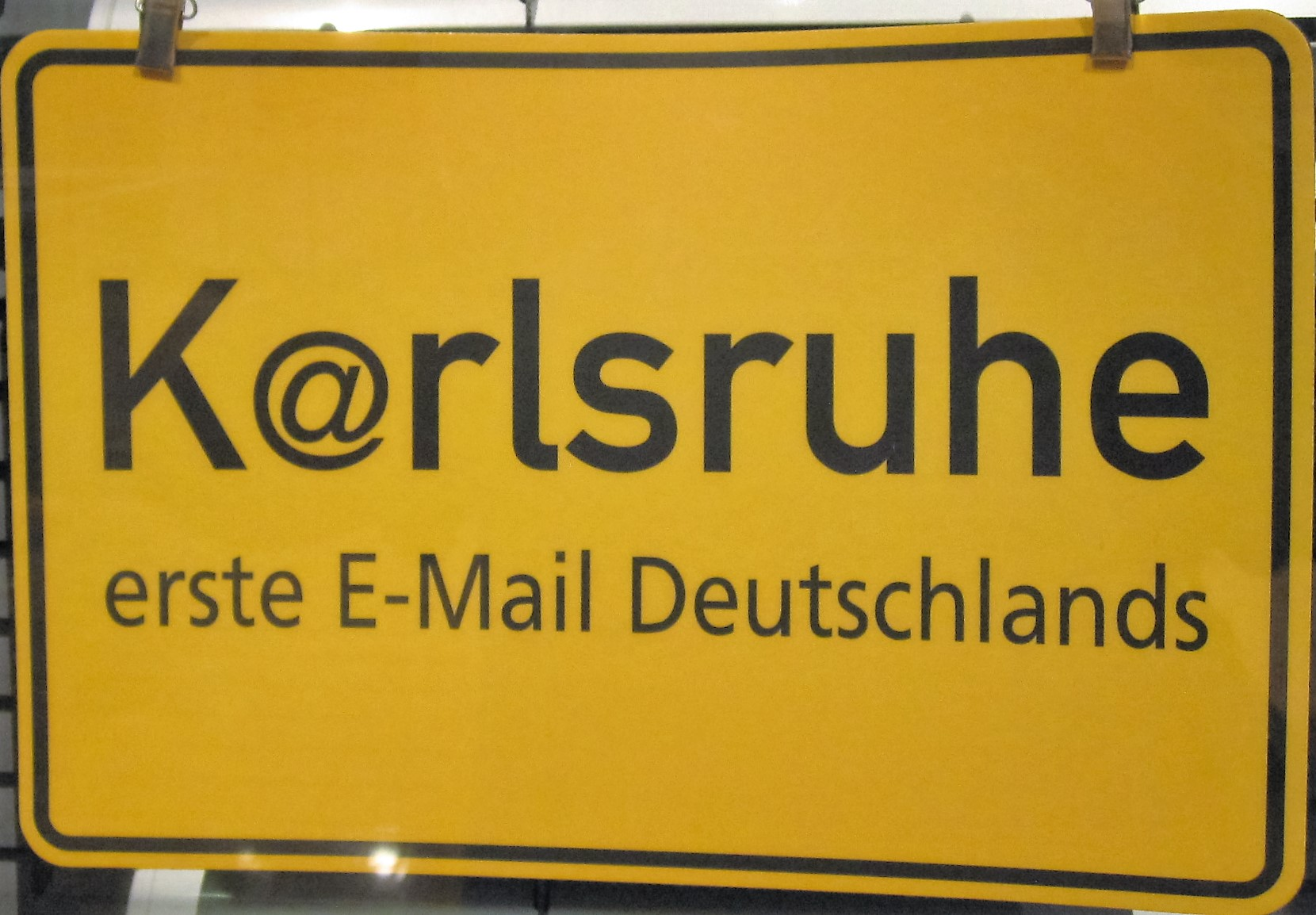
Karlsruhe - erste E-Mail Deutschlands (Heinz Nixdorf MuseumsForum in Paderborn, 2014)

With the first German Internet email in 1984, the connection of China to the international computer networks in 1987, the founding of the company Xlink in 1989 as one of the first German Internet service providers, Zorn set a number of early milestones for the Internet internationally.

In his capacity as Admin-C for the domain "germany" with the e-mail address zorn@germany, Zorn was involved in the establishment of an open network of different computer networks in the German scientific field (CSNET, EARN, EUnet and others). He came into conflict with the German Research Network DFN and became the main critic of its funding policy, which was strictly OSI-oriented and against the TCP/IP-based Internet. This Internet-OSI Standards War lasted until the early 1990s.

After moving to the Hasso Plattner Institute (HPI) at the University of Potsdam in 2001, Zorn devoted himself to the problem of hierarchically consistent modeling of communication systems in teaching and research, resulting, in particular, in 2007 in a methodologically novel approach to the quantitative analysis of discrete dynamical systems.

== Awards (selection) ==
- 2006: Order of Merit of the Federal Republic of Germany
- 2013: Inductee in the Internet Hall of Fame in the Pioneers Category
- 2014: Chinese Government Friendship Award
- 2016: Ehrenmitglied der Leibniz-Sozietaet der Wissenschaften zu Berlin.

== Publications (selection) ==
- 1985 Neueste Netznachrichten Sonderausgabe März 1985
- 1988 Wie China mit den internationalen Rechnernetzen verbunden wurde
- 1995 mit Martin Haas: Methodische Leistungsanalyse von Rechensystemen. Handbuch für Informatik 2.6, A. Endres, H. Krallmann, P. Schnupp (Hrsg.). Oldenbourg Verlag, München
- 1996 Endet das Internet im Chaos? , Deutscher Internet Kongress 1996 in Karlsruhe, Mai 1996
- 1997 Hat Deutschland die Internet-Entwicklung verschlafen? , Deutscher Internet Kongress 1997 in Düsseldorf, Mai 1997
- 1998 Über die verfehlte deutsche Internet- Entwicklung
- 2007 FMC-QE - A New Approach in Quantitative Modeling (PDF; 308 kB)
- 2016 Von der Nützlichkeit verständlicher Begriffsdefinitionen am Beispiel „Information“. In: Fuchs-Kittowski, Frank; Kriesel, Werner (Hrsg.): Informatik und Gesellschaft. Festschrift zum 80. Geburtstag von Klaus Fuchs-Kittowski. Frankfurt a. M., Bern, Bruxelles, New York, Oxford, Warszawa, Wien: Peter Lang Internationaler Verlag der Wissenschaften, PL Academic Research, ISBN 978-3-631-66719-4 (Print), E-ISBN 978-3-653-06277-9 (E-Book).

Musik & Informatik

- 1988 Musik und Informatik - ein Brückenschlag, Fassung vom 25. März 1988 (Eigenpublikation)
- 1995 Semesterkonzerts des Collegium Musicum der Universität Karlsruhe, 11. Februar 1995 Dirigent: Hubert Heitz, Solist: Werner Zorn, Klavier
  - George Enescu – 2e Rhapsodie Roumaine op. 11 Nr. 2; Wolfgang Amadeus Mozart – Konzert für Klavier und Orchester Nr. 19 F-Dur KV 459 (ab Minute 13:00)
  - George Gershwin – Rhapsody in blue; George Enescu – 1re Rhapsodie Roumaine op. 11 Nr 1 (ab Minute 39:50)
