= Howard Frank (network engineer) =

American computer scientist

- Born: June 4, 1941
- Died: May 1, 2017 (aged 75)
- Citizenship: US
- Education: PhD 1965 Northwestern University
- Known for: ARPANET
- Awards: Presidential Distinguished Service Medal, Internet Hall of Fame
- Scientific career
- Fields: Electrical engineering, computer science
- Workplaces: UC Berkeley, Office of Emergency Preparedness, Network Analysis Corporation
- Thesis: Optimum Locations on a Graph with Probabilistic Demands (1965)

Howard Frank was a network engineer who laid the groundwork for analyzing and designing computer networks.

== Career ==
Howard Frank was an academic from 1965, the year he finished his PhD, to 1968 before working for the OEP as a consultant. He then went on to found the Network Analysis Corporation a year later along with a business associate. After selling NAC to Contel Corporation, he created Network Management Incorporated in 1986. He left his corporate career in 1990 to work at DARPA where he was the founding director of Defense Department's Advanced Information Technology Services Joint Program. In 1997 he was appointed as dean of Robert H. Smith School of Business, University of Maryland, College Park where he worked until he retired in 2015.

=== Thesis and continuation of Paul Baran's work ===
His thesis: "Optimum Locations on a Graph with Probabilistic Demands" which he described as "built on probabilistic graphs of some applications and it was statistical communication type theory, sort of an extension of the Von Neumann work" was completed in 1965. Dr Frank was hired as assistant professor of engineering and computer science at the university in which he completed his PhD, that is University of California, Berkeley. During his work there he met Leonard Kleinrock and would later work with him at the OEP.

While writing his PhD, Howard Frank stumbled on a paper published in the Journal of Mathematical Biophysics on how cells reacted to radiation. He noticed that the mathematical model developed in that research could be applied to work done by Paul Baran in a series of papers called "On Distributed Communication". This insight allowed for the operations detailed in Paul Baran's work to be cut down significantly from the thousands of hours of simulation time originally necessary. Howard Frank explained in one of his interview how this kind of insight perfectly displays his talent: "My talent is that I'm a synthesist. I'm not an original creator of advanced mathematics. Never have been, but as a synthesist, I can take ideas from different fields and put them together, and I could create new things out of that, and because of that, nobody else was working in the field, I was cream skimming. I could say: "What about this?" And nobody would have thought about it yet. Nobody would have worked on it, so I worked on it."

=== OEP ===
After being noticed by a White House official at a talk on his breakthrough on Paul Baran's work, Howard Frank was invited to work at the Office of Emergency Preparedness as a consultant. The project he worked on was a proof of concept that an Office of Analytic Planning could have its use in the White House. The group he worked in therefore had to "Find a problem and solve it." They tackled two problems. The first one on how to design offshore natural gas pipeline networks for the Federal Power Commission in the Gulf of Mexico, that is, finding a system and an analytical approach to design pipelines therefore helping the Federal Power Commission review new pipeline projects. The second one on network vulnerability and survivability, survivability of the country's assets in the event of a war. The group of no more than 20 people solved the pipeline question in 11-month by making a computer program which could optimize the pipeline network to lower costs therefore saving hundreds of millions of dollars.

=== NAC and ARPA ===
After finishing his project at the OEP, in 1969, Howard Frank and Dave Rosenbaum created the Network Analysis Corporation in an effort to solve similar issues than the ones encountered while working at the OEP. Dr Frank was contacted by Lawrence Roberts to work on the topological design of the ARPANET. The NAC, with Howard as its principal investigator on this project, worked on building models with the Control Data 6600 to analyze the network and find ways to optimize it. They analyzed the network and designed upcoming changes and expansions of the network. The NAC also modeled the economics of packet switching on data and voice in a bid to convince companies to adopt this new technology. Howard attended one meeting where he and Lawrence Roberts displayed the advantages of packet switching to AT&T in telephone networks to no avail.

The NAC also worked with DARPA on a network based on the ARPANET for military use. The analysis they ran and designs they submitted led to the creation of the project AUTODIN II which never was realized. It was instead replaced by the Defense Data Network which instead of being separated from ARPANET like AUTODIN, used ARPANET. The Defense Data Network relied on the work done by the NAC for AUTODIN II.

== Personal life ==
Howard Frank was married to Jane Frank. They had 3 children.

The Franks were also known for their large Sci-Fi Art Collections.

== Awards and honours ==
- 2013 – inducted into the Internet Hall of Fame by the Internet Society.
- – received the Presidential Distinguished Service Medal.
