= Dong Liu =

Chinese computer scientist

Dong Liu is a Chinese computer scientist. He is the founder of the Beijing Internet Institute (BII Group) which played a major role in China's national information highway and IPv6 development. He is best known for global IPv6 deployment, establishing the world’s largest IPv6 testing laboratory and first IPv6 public DNS resolver. In 2025 he was inaugurated into the Internet Hall of Fame.
