= Nancy Hafkin =

Computer scientist

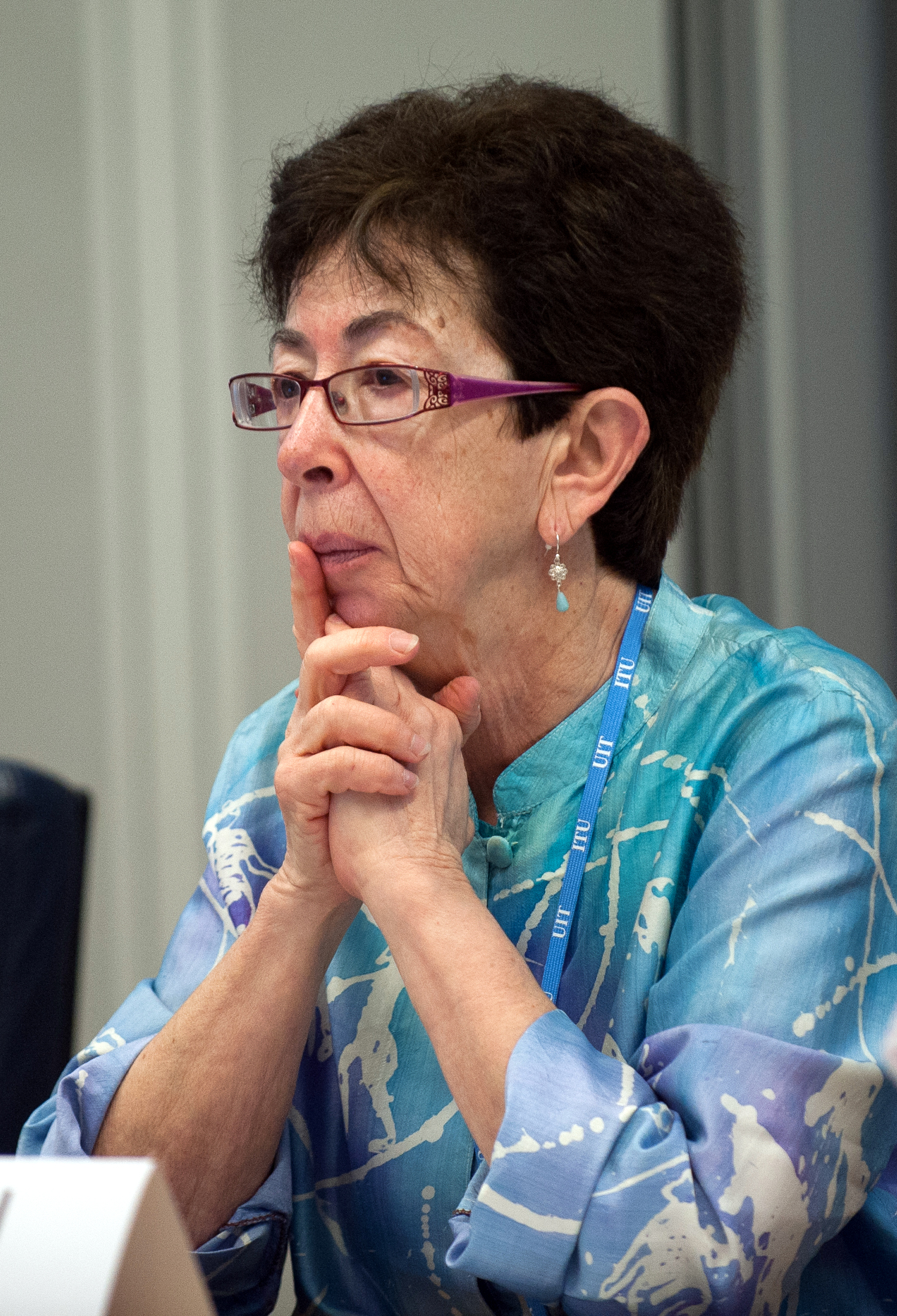
- Hafkin in 2013
- Education: Brandeis University; Boston University
- Occupation: Computer scientist
- Known for: Inducted into the Internet Hall of Fame
- Spouse: Berhanu Abebe
- Children: Two

Nancy Jane Hafkin is a pioneer of networking and development information and electronic communications in Africa, spurring the Pan African Development Information System (PADIS) of the United Nations Economic Commission for Africa (UNECA) from 1987 until 1997. She also played a role in facilitating the Association for Progressive Communications's work to enable email connectivity in more than 10 countries during the early 1990s, before full Internet connectivity became a reality in most of Africa.

== Work ==
Hafkin studied history and anthropology at Brandeis University in Boston from 1960 to 1965. She then studied at Boston University from 1965 to 1967. There, she found a mentor in Professor Ruth Morgenthau, who encouraged her to intensively study African history during her graduate studies from 1967 to 1973. At the time it was a young field in which many women were active. Hafkin received her doctorate with a thesis on Trade, Society and Politics in Northern Mozambique from 1753-1913.

=== Move to Ethiopia ===
Hafkin moved to Ethiopia in 1975 with her husband, Berhanu Abebe, an Ethiopian classmate at Brandeis, and they lived in Addis Ababa for nearly 25 years, until 2000.

When Hafkin worked for the United Nations Economic Commission for Africa (UNECA), the Internet did not yet exist. While her efforts with UNECA were focused on economic development in every African country, she noticed that information was basically inaccessible on the continent with data being shared by fax and postal delivery. There wasn't even one public library in the country so she decided to address the information crisis by launching the Pan African Development Information System (PADIS) in 1986.

In addition to her role with PADIS, she worked as a visiting professor at the University of Addis Ababa as the Chair of History from 1980–1981.

Through her time with PADIS, was able to help establish the first electronic communications networks in ten African countries and actively convinced many African government officials of the importance of the Internet.

Over the years Hafkin significantly contributed to "sharpening global awareness of developments in the context of gender and information technology as well as enabling fast and inexpensive access to information technology and thus information and networking on the African continent." Through the efforts of PADIS, new African networks have broadened access to information resources while reducing the isolation of African students.

=== Return to the U.S. ===
In 2000, she left her position with the U.N. and returned to the United States with her husband so she could continue her work improving information access for women, one of her initial goals as a young researcher.

Since retiring from academia, Hafkin still acts as a keynote speaker and gives lectures on the empowerment and participation of women in information technology.

== Writing ==
Nancy Hafkin edited Cinderella or Cyberella?: Empowering Women in the Knowledge Society, which was published in 2006 - a collection of essays discussing ways that information and communications technologies empower women.

== Awards ==
The APC (headquartered in Johannesburg) established the annual Nancy Hafkin Prize for innovation in information technology in Africa which recognizes outstanding initiatives using information and communications technology (ICTs) for development.

In 2012, Hafkin was inducted into the Internet Hall of Fame by the Internet Society.

== Bibliography ==
- Cinderella or Cyberella? Empowering Women in the Knowledge Society, editors Nancy Hafkin and Sophia Huyer (Kumarian Press, 2006) ISBN 9781565492196
