= Florencio Utreras =

Chilean mathematician (born 1951)

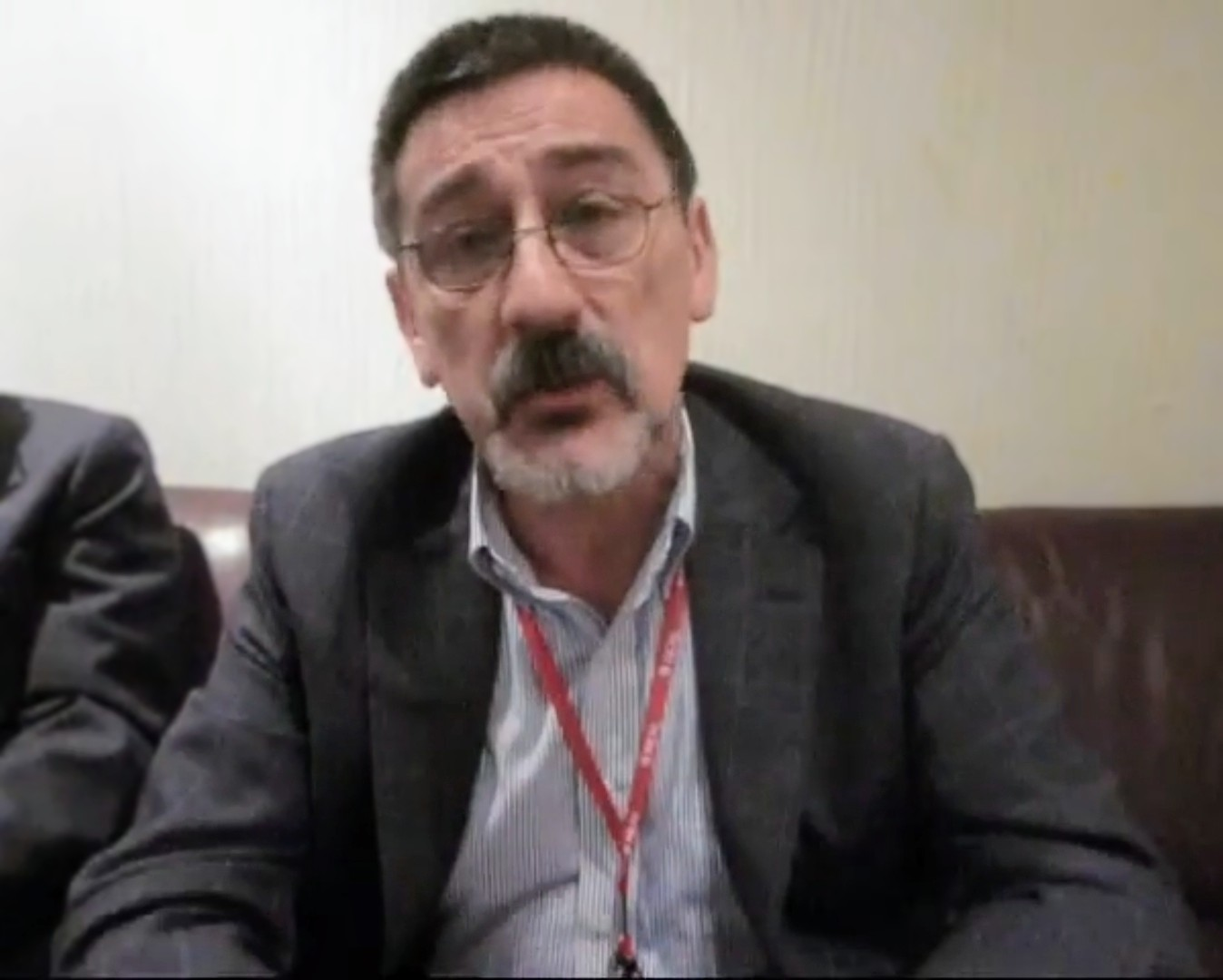
- Florencio Utreras, 2003
- Born: Florencio Ignacio Utreras Díaz; 25 December 1951 (age 73); Ancud, Chile
- Occupation: Mathematician

Florencio Ignacio Utreras Díaz (born 25 December 1951, Ancud) is a Chilean mathematician who is considered to be one of the fathers of the Internet in Chile.

== Biography ==
Utreras studied engineering mathematics at the University of Chile, graduating in 1975. Later, in 1979, he earned his doctorate in engineering at Université Grenoble Alpes in France.

In 1987, he directed the Chilean connection to BITNET, the computer network at City University in New York City and Yale University. In 1992, he contributed to the creation of National University Network (REUNA), the main academic network for Latin America and the Caribbean.

In 1997, Utreras to start the strategic alliance between REUNA and CTC (now Movistar) to create Reuna2, the broadband network that connected between Arica and Osorno, at that time the most extensive network in Latin America.

In 2003, he was a part of the founding team of the Cooperación Latinoamericana de Redes Avanzadas (Red Clara), a non-profit organization of 17 Latin American nations that brings together the education and research networks of the region. From 1998 to 2002, he was part of the presidential committees of Chile in the Internet Society and, in 2016, received the recognition of World Telecommunications Day, granted by the Undersecretary of Telecommunications of Chile.

In 2017, Utreras was inaugurated into the Internet Hall of Fame in the Global Connectors category for his important and pioneering contributions to the connectivity of Chile and Latin America to the Internet.
