= Demi Getschko =

Brazilian computer scientist

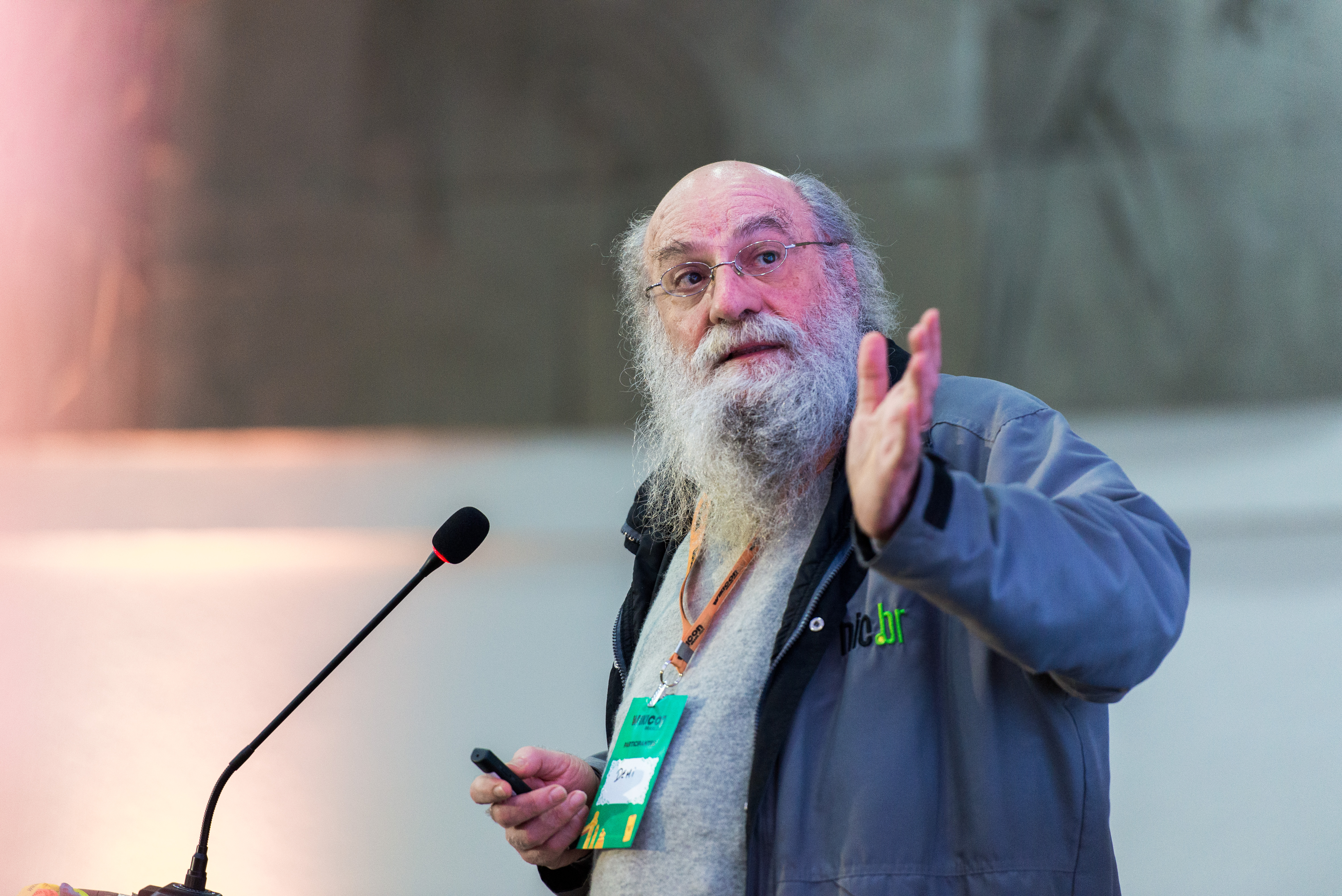
- Demi Getschko at WikiCon Brasil 2025
- Born: 4 May 1953 (age 73); Trieste, Free Territory of Trieste (now Italy)
- Occupation: Computer scientist

Demi Getschko (born 4 May 1953) is a Brazilian computer scientist who is considered one of the pioneers of the Internet in Brazil. He currently is the CEO of NIC.br.

== Early life ==
Son of immigrants Emil Gestchko (Greek, chemical engineer) and Erifili Dimitrova Getschko (Bulgarian, pharmacist), Demi was born in Trieste, Free Territory of Trieste (now Italy), and arrived as refugees in Santos, Brazil aged 11 months.

== Career ==
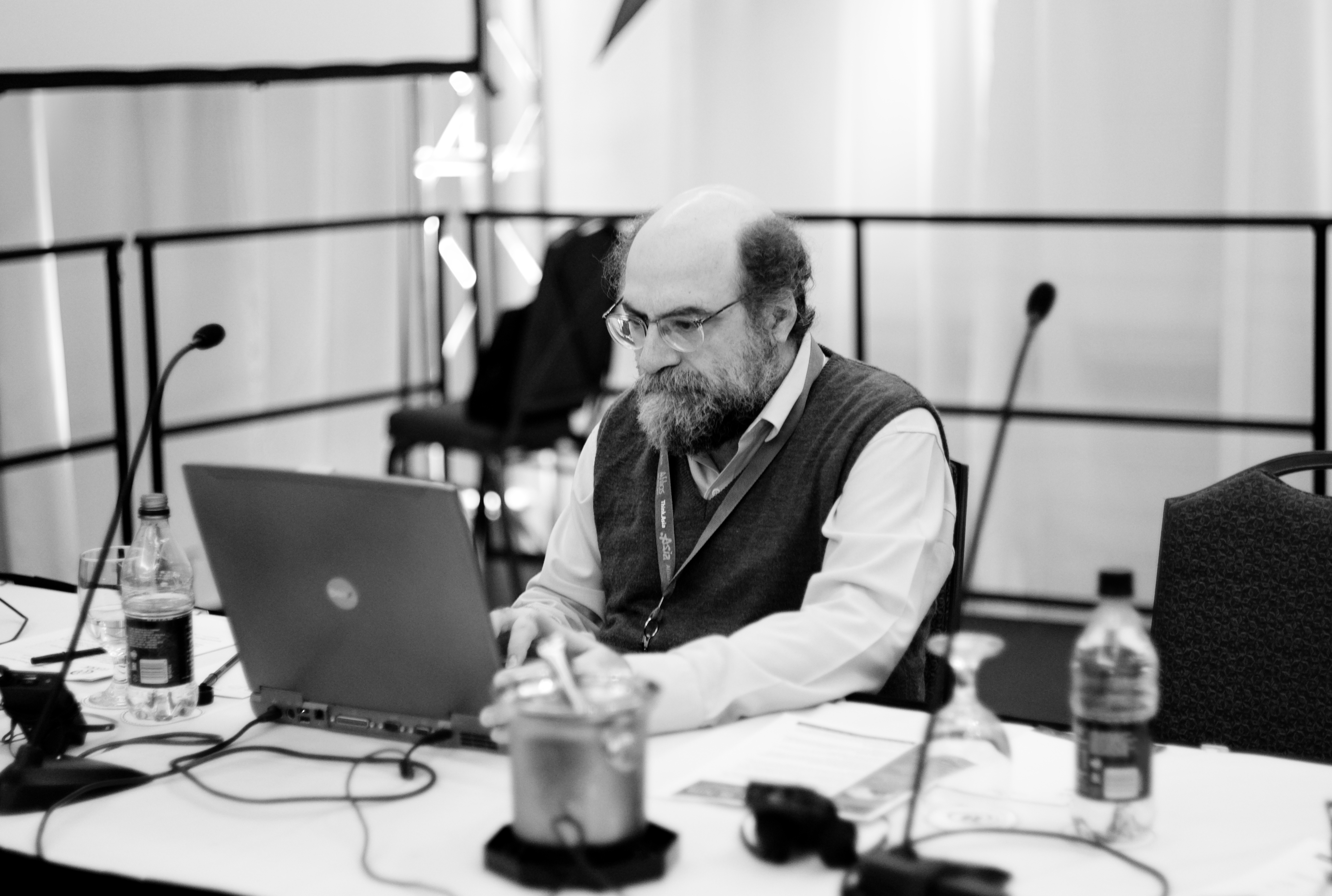
Getschko in 2007

Getschko is an electrical engineer who graduated from the Polytechnic School of the University of São Paulo in 1975, with a master's degree in 1980 and a doctorate in 1989, both in engineering by the same institution.

He worked at the Electronic Computing Center (CCE) at USP (1971–1985) and at the Data Processing Center at the São Paulo Research Foundation (1986–1996). In that period, he was an operations coordinator at RNP and participated in the network deployment effort in the country. He was one of those responsible for the first Brazilian TCP/IP connection in 1991 between FAPESP and the Energy Sciences Network (ESNet) in the United States by Fermilab. As such, he is considered one of the pioneers of Brazilian Internet.

Getschko worked as the Technology Director for Agência Estado, a subsidiary of Grupo Estado, between 1996 and 2000, and again between 2002 and 2005. He also served as the vice president of technology for iG between 2000 and 2001.

He was also a professor at the Polytechnic School of USP, and today he is an associate professor at the Pontifical Catholic University of São Paulo, where he teaches computer architecture (CA) and coordinates the Layer 2 laboratory of Projeto KyaTera.

Until May 2009, Getschko served as a member of the board of directors of ICANN by the ccNSO (Country Code Names Support Organization), elected for the 2005–2007 term and re-elected for the 2007–2009 term.

He has been a director of the Comitê Gestor da Internet no Brasil since 1995 and has been the CEO of NIC.br since 2006. He is also a member of the advisory board of the Brazilian Chamber of Electronic Commerce. In October 2010, he was appointed a member of the board of directors of Telebrás. In April 2014, he was honored with his inclusion in the Internet Hall of Fame of the Internet Society in the Global connectors category, later serving on the Hall of Fame's advisory board in 2017. In April 2016, he received a special tribute in the 1st Digital Professional Award of ABRADi-SP, for his years of contributions to the Brazilian Internet.
