= Tan Tin Wee =

Singaporean bioinformatician

Prof. Tan Tin Wee at Super Computing Asia 2018

Tan Tin Wee (born 1962) is a Singaporean bioinformatician and Internet pioneer. He is an Associate Professor in the Department of Biochemistry at the Yong Loo Lin School of Medicine, National University of Singapore (NUS), where he holds the Della Suantio Lee Professorship in Mental Health and Digital Science and co-directs the MSc programme in Precision Health and Medicine x Artificial Intelligence. He is also Domain Lead in AI for Science at the NUS AI Institute.

Tan is known for his work as the inventor and founder of multilingual Internet technologies and Internationalized Domain Names (IDNs). In 2012, he was inducted into the inaugural Internet Hall of Fame as a Global Connector for his contributions to the development of the Internet in Asia. He later served as founding Chief Executive and Director of the National Supercomputing Centre Singapore (NSCC).

His more recent work applies high-performance computing and artificial intelligence to biomedical science, including digital mental health, precision health, brain connectomics, and dementia-related caregiver support.

== Education ==
Tan grew up in Singapore and studied Biochemistry at the University of Cambridge (1982 to 1985). He then earned an MSc in Molecular Biology and Biotechnology from University College London and a PhD in molecular biology on vaccines from the University of Edinburgh (1990).

== Career and Research ==
Internet and networking

Tan joined the Department of Biochemistry, then part of the Faculty of Medicine at the National University of Singapore (NUS) in 1990, working with molecular biologists to expand genetic engineering technology within the medical school and life sciences departments. This training was later extended to schools through the Schools Biotechnology Workshop, coordinated by the Ministry of Education and the National Science Council as part of the National Biotechnology Masterplan.

He contributed to Singapore's early academic Internet network, TechNet, and introduced technologies including WAIS, Gopher and the World Wide Web to the research community, alongside early Chinese- and Tamil-language Internet services, biological databases and Internet broadcasting. In 1998, Tan and his team developed a working multilingual Internet domain-name system, an early implementation of what became Internationalized Domain Names (IDNs), and he helped establish the Multilingual Internet Names Consortium (MINC).

In 2012, he was inducted into the inaugural Internet Hall of Fame as a Global Connector. The Asia Pacific Network Information Centre subsequently described him as "Singapore's father of IDNs" in recognition of his work on multilingual domain names.

Bioinformatics and supercomputing

Tan founded the Bioinformatics Centre at NUS in 1996 and co-founded the Asia Pacific Bioinformatics Network (APBioNet) in 1998, working on biological databases, computational biology, immunomics and vaccine informatics. He later chaired the A*STAR Computational Resource Centre (A*ARC) and became founding Chief Executive and Director of the National Supercomputing Centre Singapore (NSCC), overseeing development of Singapore’s high-performance computing infrastructure and its applications in computational science, biology and artificial intelligence.

AI, digital health and caregiver support

Tan's recent work applies AI and computational science to health and ageing, spanning precision health, digital mental health, computational biology and brain connectomics. He has served as a trainer with the Caregiver-to-Caregiver Dementia Programme run by Caregivers Alliance and has written on caregiving, dementia support, and ageing-related conditions.

Leadership and Governance

Tan currently serves as a Governor of the Anglo-Chinese School Board of Governors, a board director of Brahm Centre Ltd, and chairman of the Senate and Academic Advisory Board at the Management Development Institute of Singapore (MDIS). He also co-chairs the ASEAN High Performance Computing Task Force and is an advisor to the Asia Pacific Bioinformatics Network (APBioNet). He previously served on the boards of Keppel Telecommunications & Transportation and Keppel DC REIT, and chaired the A*STAR Computational Resource Centre (A*CRC), and was the founding Chief Executive and Director of the National Supercomputing Centre Singapore (NSCC).

== Personal life ==
Tan was married to the late Karen Seow. They have a daughter and a son.

== Awards and Recognitions ==
Selected awards and recognition are listed below; awards received before 2011 are not included.
Year	Award/Recognition	Organisation	Ref
2011	Lifetime ISCB Membership Award	The International Conference on Bioinformatics (InCoB)/Asia-Pacific Bioinformatics Network (APBioNet)	Cn
2011	Best Managed Board Award - Keppel Telecommunications and Transportation Ltd	Singapore Corporate Awards 2011	Cn
2012	Internet Hall of Fame inaugural inductee	Internet Society, Geneva	Cn
2013	National Day Awards - 25 Years Long Service (Pingat Bakti Setia)	Singapore Government	Cn
2013	SINGAREN Appreciation Award	SINGAREN	Cn
2015	Technology Leadership Award for InfiniCortex	FutureGov Singapore Awards	Cn
2015	Innovative Project Gold Award for InfiniCortex	Ministry of Trade and Industry, Singapore	Cn
2015	A*STAR Innovation Awards	Agency for Science, Technology and Research (A*STAR), Singapore	Cn
2015	INFITT 2015 Award	Tamil Internet Conference 2015	Cn
2015	Singapore's Scientific Pioneers	Asian Scientist	Cn
2023	SBR Technology Excellence Awards 2023	Singapore Business Review	Cn
2024	Outstanding Visionary Leadership Award	Asia-Pacific Bioinformatics Network (APBioNet)	Cn
2026	Pioneers of NSCC award	National Supercomputing Centre Singapore (NSCC)	Cn
