= Anriette Esterhuysen =

South African human rights defender and computer networking pioneer

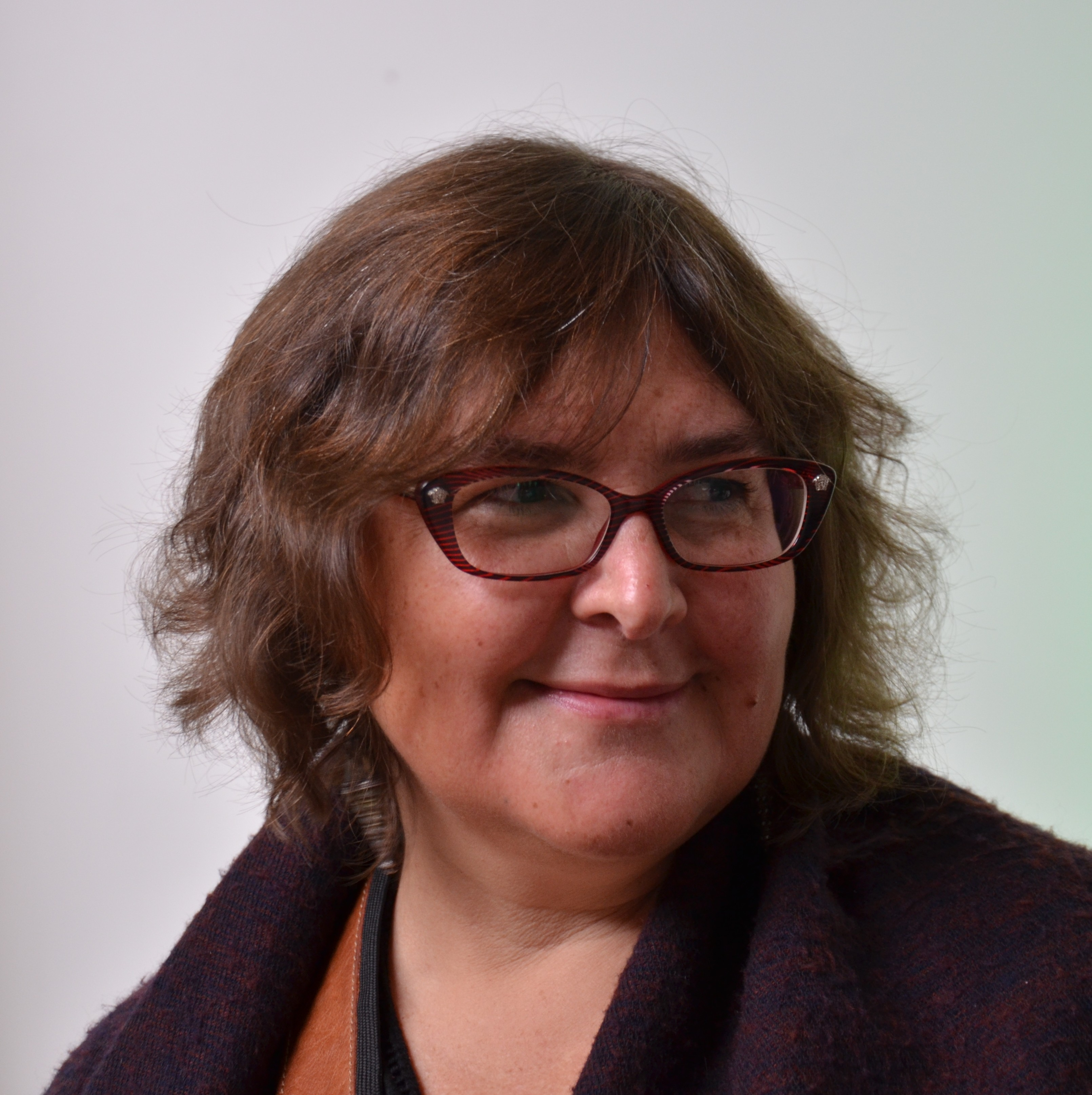
- Anriette Esterhuysen in 2014

Anriette Esterhuysen is a human rights defender and computer networking pioneer from South Africa. She has pioneered the use of Internet and Communications Technologies (ICTs) to promote social justice in South Africa and throughout the world, focusing on affordable Internet access. She was the executive director of the Association for Progressive Communications from 2000 until April 2017, when she became APC's Director of Policy and Strategy. In November 2019 United Nations Secretary-General António Guterres appointed Esterhuysen to chair the Internet Governance Forum’s Multistakeholder Advisory Group.

== Education and work ==
Esterhuysen holds a BA in Social Science, a Post Graduate Diploma in Library and Information Science and a BA in Musicology from the University of the Witwatersrand. During her university years, she was campus coordinator for the South African Student Press Union.

In 1994, Anriette became the inaugural executive director of SANGONeT, a South African communications NGO, which itself was a merger of Worknet (a communications NGO and member of the Association for Progressive Communications) and the Development Resources Center's Handsnet initiative. SANGONeT provided Internet connectivity, technical training, and website hosting to civil society organisations, trade unions, and others engaged in the mass democratic movement.

In 1992-1993 she was Director of Information Services at South Africa's Development Resources Centre, where she set up a library and online news service for the NGO sector in South and Southern Africa, while mobilising information technologies to facilitate information and communication exchange in the broader development sector. Prior to that, she was Chief Librarian and consultant for the South African Council of Churches (SACC), where she facilitated training in documentation techniques and information management.

From 1980 onwards, Esterhuysen was active in the struggle against Apartheid. Through her work at the SACC, and with the Church becoming an important civil society space at the height of the anti-apartheid struggle, she saw the increasing importance of technology in accessing and sharing information. “In the late ‘80s, anti-apartheid groups, labour federations, environmental organisations and members of the green movement began using emerging communications technology to further their work in social justice and activism. It was out of this development that APC was formed in 1990.” During the transition to democracy, Esterhuysen worked in promoting the use of ICTs to the emerging community of local NGOs.

Esterhuysen currently chairs the Multistakeholder Advisory Group of the Internet Governance Forum. She is a founder of Women's Net in South Africa and has served on the Technical Advisory Committee of the United Nations Economic Commission for Africa and on the boards of the Global e-Schools and Communities Initiative and Ungana-Afrika.

Prior to joining APC Esterhuysen was executive director of South African Internet service provider member SANGONeT. Between 2002 and 2005, she was a member of the United Nations Information and Communication Technologies Task Force.

In 2017, Esterhuysen was appointed to the Global Commission on the Stability of Cyberspace, and she served on the commission until its successful conclusion in 2019, participating in the drafting of its eight norms related to non-aggression in cyberspace.

In November 2019, Esterhuysen was appointed by the Secretary-General of the United Nations to serve as the chair of the Multistakeholder Advisory Group, the coordination body for the Internet Governance Forum

== Awards and achievements ==
She was one of five finalists for IT Personality of the Year in South Africa in 2012. She was inducted to the Internet Hall of Fame in 2013 as a "Global Connector". In 2015, she was the winner of the Electronic Frontier Foundation' s Pioneer Awards.

== Publications ==
- ‘Toward a Social Compact for Digital Privacy and Security’, for the Centre for International Governance Innovation and Chatham House (2016)
- ‘Shifting Power and Human Rights Diplomacy’, for Amnesty International (2014)
- ‘¿Por qué enfocarnos en los derechos económicos, sociales y culturales?’, in América Latina en Movimiento (2016)
- ‘Access: the first and final frontier’, in Internet Governance Forum: Creating Opportunities for All (2010)
- ‘Circling the point: from ICT4D to Web 2.0 and back again’ in Participatory Learning and Action (2009)
- ‘Reflections on the Internet Governance Forum from 2006-8’, in Internet Governance Forum (IGF): The First Two Years (2008)
- ‘Open, Universal, and Affordable Access to the Internet’ in The Power of Ideas: Internet Governance in a Global Multi-Stakeholder Environment (2007)
- ‘Women's human rights in the Information Society’, in Human Rights in the Global Information Society (2006)
- ‘The right to development’ in Human Rights in the Global Information Society, MIT Press (2006)
- ‘Participation in development processes: can ICT make a difference?’, in Access, Empowerment & Governance: Creating a World of Equal Opportunities with ICT, Global Knowledge Partnership, Kuala Lumpur (2005)
- ‘Participation of communities, stakeholders and users’, in How to Get Started and Keep Going: A Guide to Community Multimedia Centres, UNESCO (2004)
- ‘What Does the “Information Society” Mean for Social Justice and Civil Society?’, in Information Technologies and International Development, MIT Press (2003)
- ‘The Telecentre Cookbook for Africa: Recipes for self-sustainability’, for UNESCO (2001)
- ‘Globalisation and Cooperation: Establishing Dialogue’, for the Information Management Working Group of the European Association for Development Training and Research (2000)
- ‘Civil society use of the Internet’, for the Inter Press Service Council meeting, Helsinki (1998)
- ‘How civil society organisations in Africa use the Internet’, for Highway Africa, Rhodes University, Grahamstown (1997)
- ‘Women and the Internet’, for the Commonwealth Conference of Ministers of Education, Botswana (1997)
- ‘The use of information and communications technologies in managing and sharing gender information in Africa’ (1997)
- ‘The role of SANGONeT in providing information for development in South Africa’, in Meta-Information Bulletin (1995)
- ‘The role of the Internet in facilitating regional linkages in Southern Africa’, in Electronic Library (1995)
- ‘A guide to compiling local community resource maps’, for the Development Resources Centre (1992)
- ‘Women and the environment in South Africa’, in Healing the Earth: Women’s Strategies for the Environment (1991)
- ‘Collection Development‘, in EDICESA Manual on documentation Techniques, (1991)
