= Nabil Bukhalid =

Lebanese computer scientist

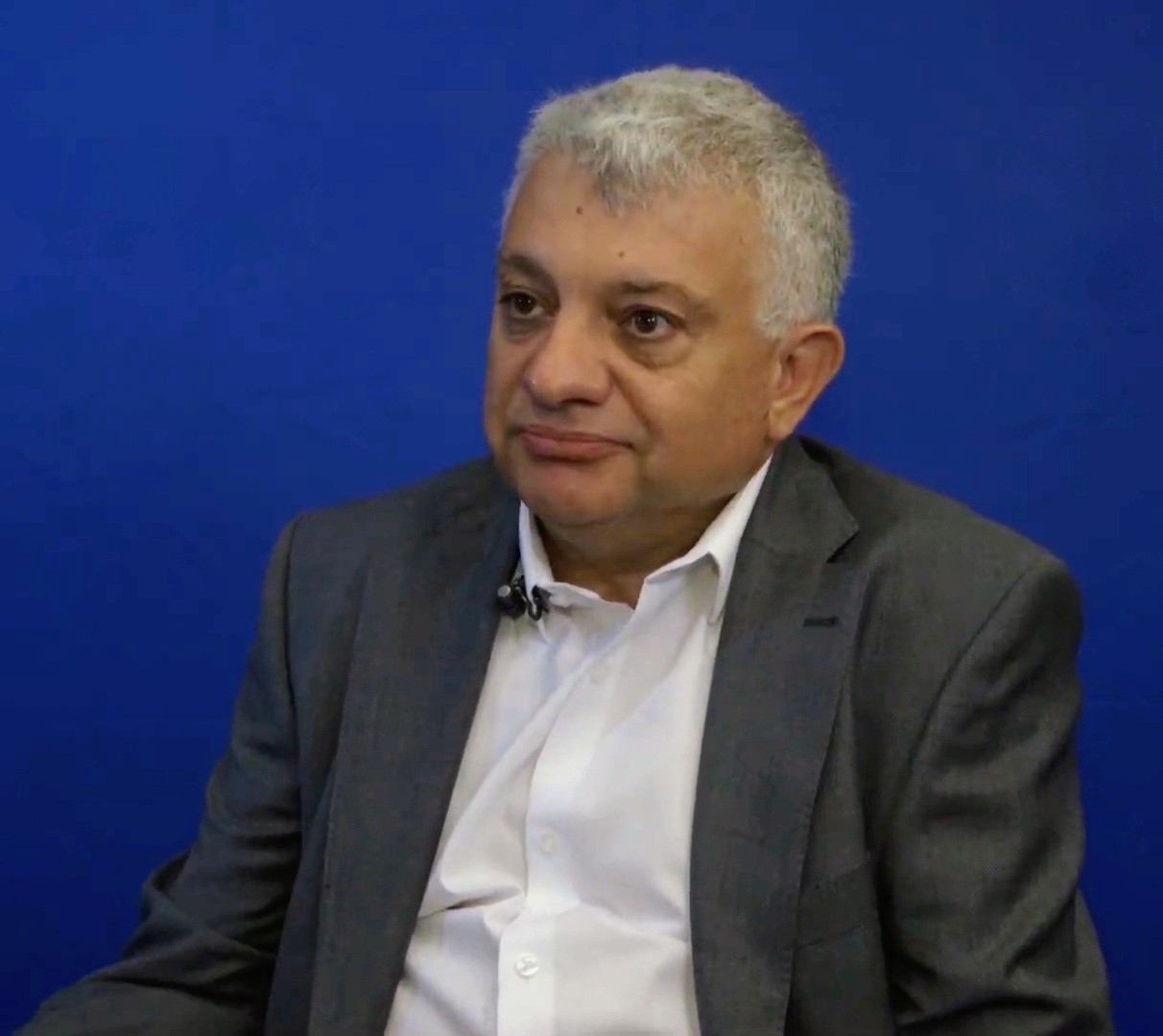
- Nabil Bukhalid, 2017
- Born: 1957; Bhamdoun, Lebanon
- Died: 3 January 2023 (aged 65); London, United Kingdom
- Education: American University of Beirut
- Occupation: Computer scientist

Nabil Bukhalid (1957 – 3 January 2023) was a Lebanese computer scientist and founder of the Lebanese Academic and Research Network. He is an Internet Hall of Fame Inductee and he was one of the key figures responsible for introducing the Internet to Lebanon and establishing the Lebanese Domain Registry. He is commonly referred to as the "Father of the Internet" in Lebanon.

== Early life ==
Nabil Bukhalid was born in 1957 in the town of Bhamdoun, Lebanon. Bukhalid graduated from the American University of Beirut with a Bachelor of Electrical Engineering in 1981 and an Executive Master's in Business Administration in 2005. After the end of the Lebanese Civil War he emigrated to Montreal, Canada with his wife and daughters.

== Career ==
Bukhalid's experience with computers started during the Lebanese Civil War, where as a biomedical engineer he used to hide in the hospital he used to work at to avoid the destruction of the civil war. This is where he began to tinker with computers and local area networks. This led him to attempt to connect the AUB to the internet to connect the university to the academic scene in the United States.

Bukhalid headed the computing and networking services department at AUB from 2000 to 2011 as director and then as Chief Enterprise Architect of IT at AUB.

He founded the Lebanese Domain Registry and served as its administrator since 1993. The original purpose for the .lb DNS was for the AUB's website, and it was created in August 1993. The .lb top level domain was assigned to Bukhalid by Jon Postel, the former administrator of the Internet Assigned Numbers Authority (IANA).

Since its founding, the .lb domain was given to site owners for free, however to avoid conflicts, site owners were asked obtain a trademark certificate from the Ministry of Economy and Trade. This effectively made the entire DNS system run (but not owned) by Bukhalid and his team at AUB, despite their continuous attempts to get a Lebanese governmental agency to run the administration of the .lb domain. In 2011 he met with the former president of Lebanon, Michel Suleiman to discuss how the internet system and the .lb domain would be administered in Lebanon. He most recently worked as a consultant for organizations specializing in Internet infrastructure. In 2017 he was inducted into the Internet Hall of Fame for his efforts to bring the internet to Lebanon.

He died on January 3, 2023, from a heart attack while vacationing in London.
