= Ben Segal (computer scientist) =

British-Swiss computer scientist

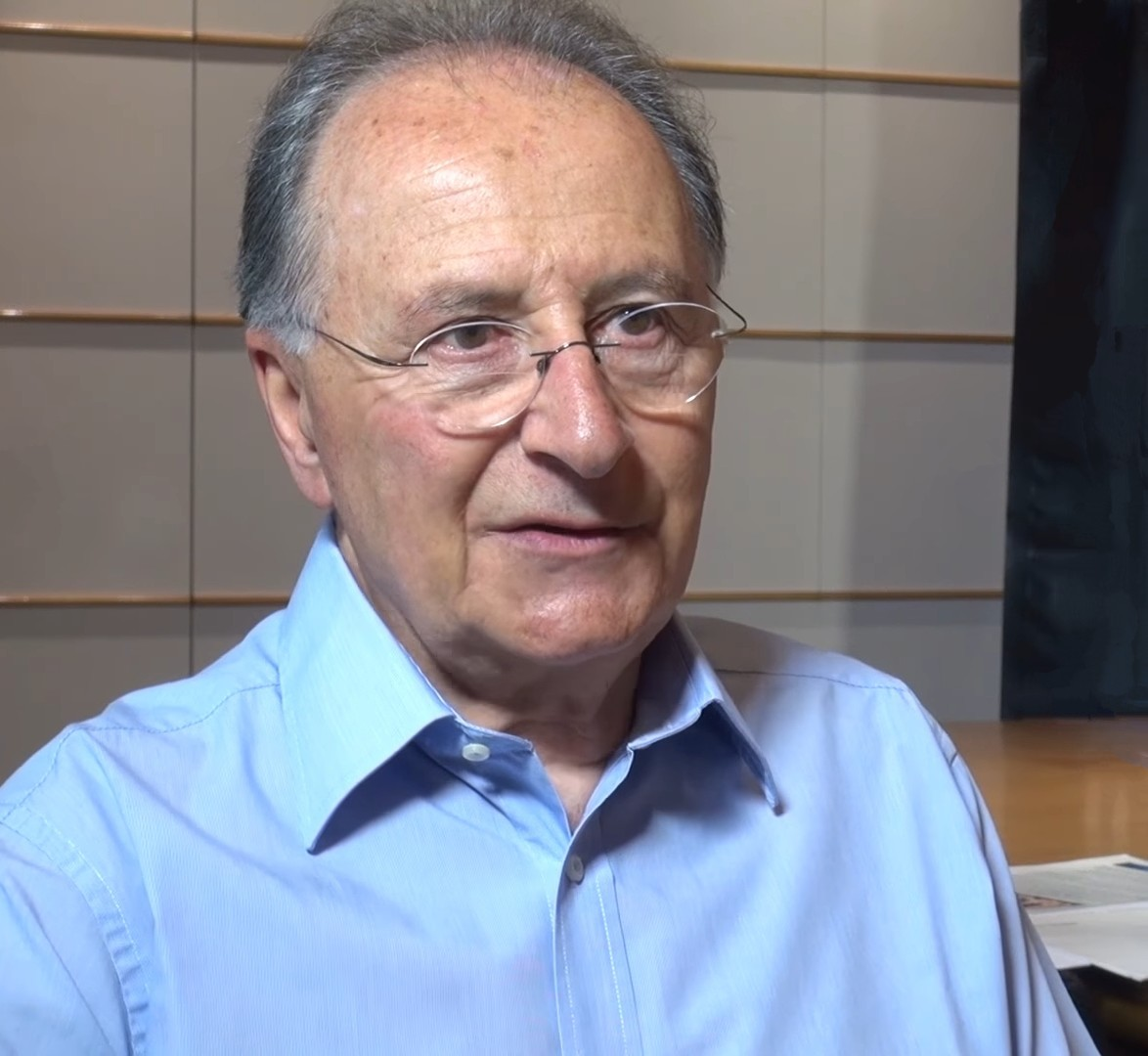
Ben Segal in 2014 at the Internet Hall of Fame Induction.

Ben Maurice Segal (born 19 May 1937 in Tel Aviv) is a British-Swiss computer scientist. He is known for his role as an Internet promoter.

== Biography ==
He attended William Hulme's Grammar School, Manchester, and then Imperial College, London, graduating with a Bachelor of Science in physics and mathematics in 1958.

Segal worked from 1958 to 1962 for the UK Atomic Energy Authority, Industrial Division, in Risley, on fast breeder reactor development. He then moved to Detroit, Michigan, USA, to work on the Enrico Fermi fast breeder project from 1962 to 1965, and then to Stanford University in California for a PhD in mechanical and nuclear engineering (1966–1971). His thesis was on "Shock wave structure using nonlinear model Boltzmann equations" under the supervision of Joel H. Ferziger.

In July 1971 he returned to Europe and worked as a systems programmer and later as a computer networking specialist at CERN—the European Organization for Nuclear Research in Geneva, Switzerland. Apart from a sabbatical year in 1977 working at the Bell Northern Research laboratory in Palo Alto, California, he stayed at CERN until his retirement in 2002.

Between 1985 and 1988 he co-ordinated the introduction at CERN of the TCP/IP Internet protocols, permitting interconnection of the principal computer systems inside the laboratory before CERN joined the world Internet in early 1989.

From 1989 he played a major role in the project "SHIFT" that replaced CERN's mainframe computers by distributed Unix clusters. Segal was responsible for the system's high performance computer network. By the year 2000, SHIFT had already increased CERN's installed computing power by a factor of a hundred. The SHIFT architecture was then extended to build the World Wide LHC Computing Grid, used since that time to analyse the massive and still increasing amounts of experimental data taken by the physics experiments around the Large Hadron Collider at CERN. In 2001 CERN was awarded the Computerworld Honors award for 21st Century Achievement for this innovative application of information technology to the benefit of society.

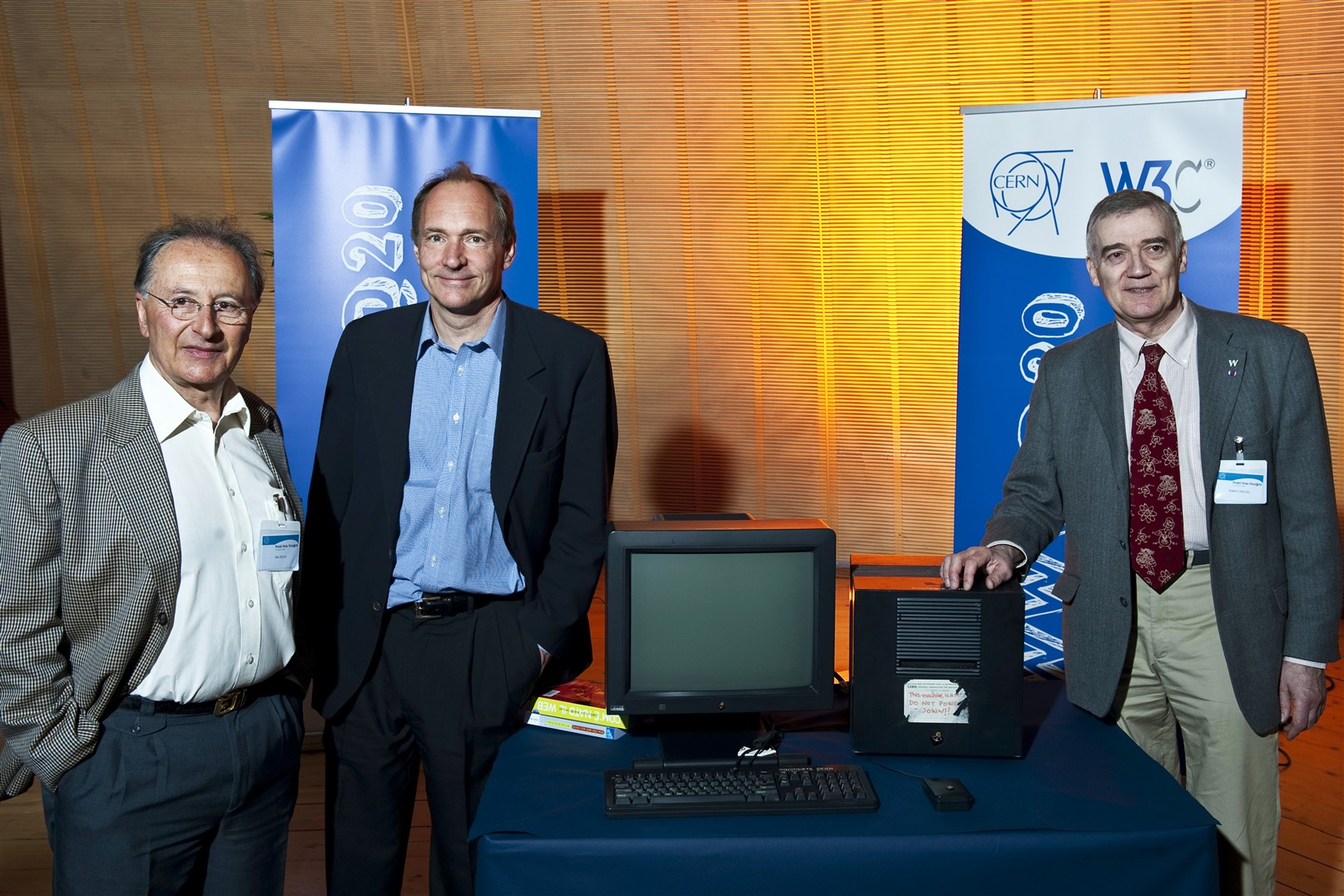
Ben Segal, Tim Berners-Lee, the Next, and Robert Cailliau celebrating the 20th anniversary of Berners-Lee's memorandum, titled "Information Management: A Proposal", to the management at CERN.

Segal's work on TCP/IP and CERN's acceptance of the Internet in 1989, enabled Tim Berners-Lee to develop the World Wide Web and its related protocols. Berners-Lee acknowledged in 2014 Segal as a mentor during the years he developed the Web.

Segal was a founding member of the Internet Society (ISOC), Geneva chapter, and elected to the ISOC Board of Trustees between 1997 and 2000.

Since his retirement, Segal remained active until 2023 as an honorary member of the CERN personnel. He has worked in the developing field of volunteer computing where the general public is invited to contribute to major scientific computing challenges by volunteering some of their private computing power. Segal co-founded and is still active in CERN's own such project, LHC@home, which has attracted several hundred thousand contributors since its launch in 2004.

== Awards and honors ==
- Internet Hall of Fame induction (2014)

== See also ==
- Video interview with Segal at the Internet Hall of Fame 2014 (12 min 14 s)
- Speech given by Segal at the Internet Hall of Fame induction 2014 (3 min 30 s)
