= Michael Stanton =

British-Brazilian computer scientist

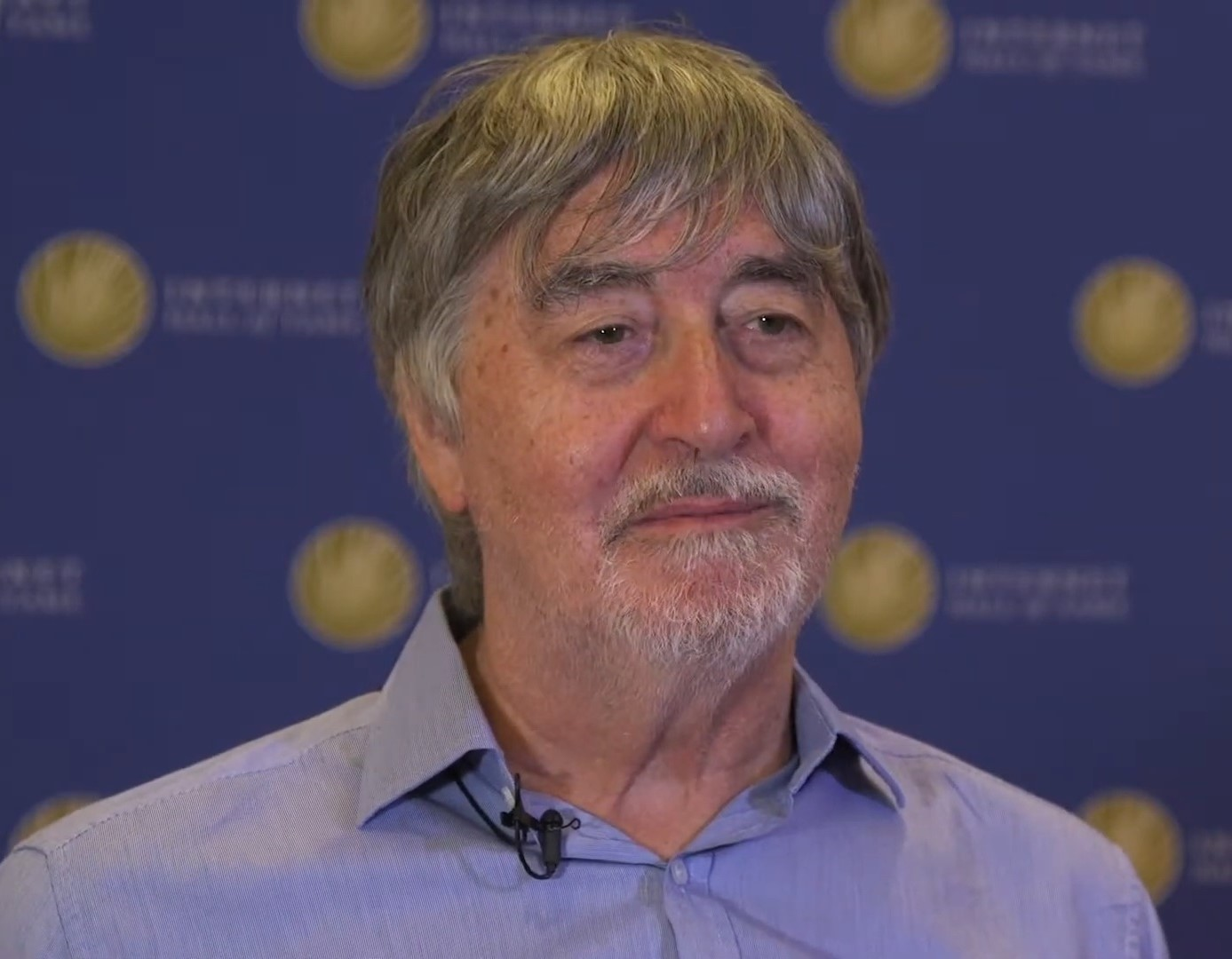
- Stanton in 2019
- Education: University of Cambridge (PhD)
- Occupation: Computer scientist

Michael Stanton is a British-Brazilian computer scientist who is the former director of the Rede Nacional de Ensino e Pesquisa (RNP). He is currently a professor at Fluminense Federal University (UFF). He was instrumental in bringing the Internet to Brazil.

He earned a doctorate in mathematics from the University of Cambridge in 1971. In 2019, he was inducted into the Internet Hall of Fame.
