= Lawrence Landweber =

American writer and academic

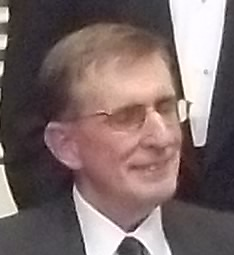
Lawrence Landweber 2012 at a meeting of the members of the Internet Hall of Fame

Lawrence Hugh Landweber is John P. Morgridge Professor Emeritus of computer science at the University of Wisconsin–Madison.

He received his bachelor's degree in 1963 from Brooklyn College and his Ph.D. from Purdue University in 1967. His doctoral thesis was "A design algorithm for sequential machines and definability in monadic second-order arithmetic."

He is best known for founding the CSNET project in 1979, which later developed into NSFNET. He is credited with making the fundamental decision to use the TCP/IP protocol.

== Publications ==
He co-authored Brainerd, Walter S., and Lawrence H. Landweber. Theory of Computation. New York: Wiley, 1974. ISBN 978-0-471-09585-9.

== Awards ==
- Member of the board of trustees of Internet Society (1992-1997)
- President, Internet Society (1995-1997)
- Fellow, ACM.
- Honorary Doctor of Humane Letters, Brooklyn College, 2009
- IEEE Award on International Communication, 2005
- Member of the board of Internet2 (2000–2008)
- Jonathan B. Postel Service Award of the Internet Society, for CSNET, 2009
- In 2012, Landweber was inducted into the Internet Hall of Fame by the Internet Society.
