= Toru Takahashi (Internet) =

Japanese Internet advocate (1941–2022)

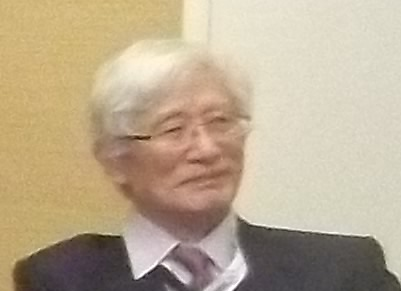
Takahashi at a meeting of the members of the Internet Hall of Fame in 2012

Toru Takahashi (Japanese: 高橋徹 Takahashi Tōru; January 1941 – 20 December 2022) was a Japanese computer network researcher and businessman. He was credited with contributing to the spread of the Internet into Japan and the rest of Asia in the 1990s and was a pivotal figure in the early commercial development of the Internet. For this reason, he was often called the "Father of the Internet" in Japan.

Takahashi was born in Utsunomiya, Tochigi Prefecture in 1941. After graduating from the Faculty of Arts at Tohoku University in 1964, he worked as a contributing editor and writer. Since 1982, he has been involved in marketing of Videotex. Since 1986, he has worked on a high-speed LAN construction project using UNIX workstations and routers. Since 1987, he began researching the Internet and assumed office as a member of the Japan Unix Users Association. In 1993, he became secretary general at the time of establishing the Japan Internet Association and became its chairman in 1997. In 1994, he established the Tokyo Internet ISP and became its president. In 2001, when the Japan Internet Association merged with the Electronic Network Council and became the Foundation Internet Association, he became the deputy chief of Foundation Internet Association, and in 2002 became the chairperson of the Asia Pacific Internet Association, and later became a director.

In 2002, Takahashi received the Minister for Internal Affairs and Communications Minister's Award for Information and Communication. In 2012, he was chosen as the only Japanese person among the 33 members of the Internet Society's Internet Hall of Fame in the Global Connectors category for his contributions in spreading the Internet into Japan and the rest of Asia.

Takahashi died on 20 December 2022, at the age of 81.

== Bibliography ==
- 高橋徹 (2000). インターネット革命の彼方へ - IT国家戦略と情報化社会. ベストセラーズ. ISBN 978-4584185674.
- 藤田田、高橋徹 (2001). 藤田田社長が高橋徹教授にIT特別講義を受ける. ベストセラーズ. ISBN 978-4584186107.
- ティム・バーナーズ＝リー (2001). Webの創成 - World Wide Webはいかにして生まれどこに向かうのか. 高橋徹（訳）. mynavi.jp 毎日コミュニケーションズ. ISBN 978-4839902872.
- 高橋徹（編）、安田浩（編）、永田守男（編）, ed. (2002). 次代のIT戦略 - 改革のためのサイバー・ガバナンス. NIRAチャレンジ・ブックス. 日本経済評論社. ISBN 978-4818814523.
