= Dennis Jennings (Internet pioneer) =

Irish physicist and Internet pioneer

- Occupations: Academic; internet pioneer; venture capitalist

Academic background
- Education: University College Dublin

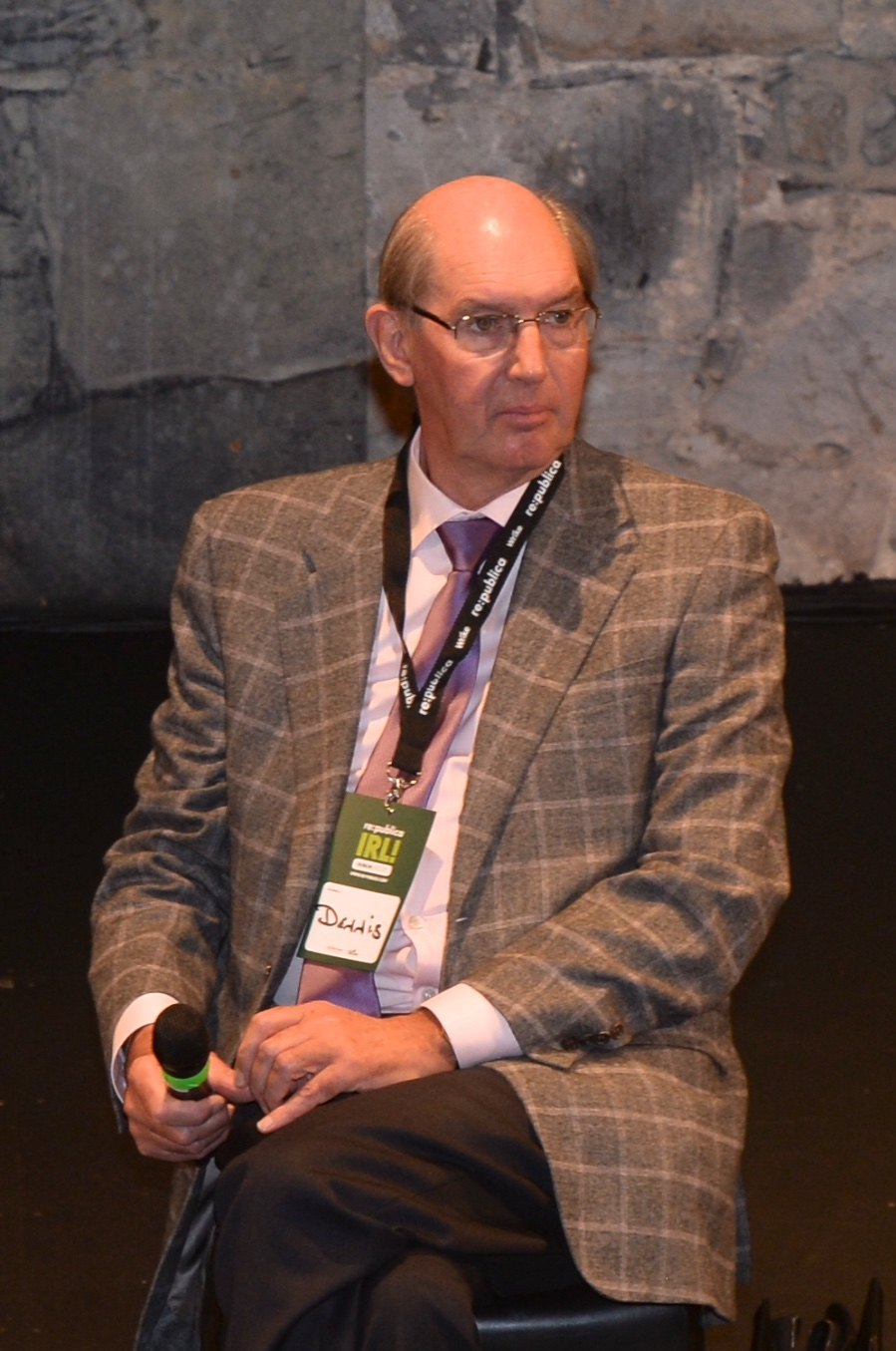
Dennis Jennings, 2016

Dennis M. Jennings is an Irish physicist, academic, Internet pioneer, and venture capitalist. In 1985–1986 he was responsible for three critical decisions that shaped the subsequent development of NSFNET, the network that became the Internet.

== Education and academic career ==
Dennis Jennings holds a 1st Class honours physics BSc degree (1967) and a PhD degree (1972) obtained for a search for high-energy gamma radiation from pulsars (neutron stars), both from University College Dublin.

Jennings was the director of Computing Services at the University College Dublin from 1977 to 1999, where he was responsible for the university IT infrastructure and a staff of over 90 people. In 1979, the pre-Internet Irish Universities Network was set up between UCD and Trinity College Dublin, with Jennings in UCD and Michael Purser and Ahmed Patel in TCD. In 1986, while on leave from UCD he was interim President of the Consortium for Scientific Computing at the John von Neumann Centre (JvNC) in Princeton, New Jersey, responsible for the start-up of the supercomputer centre. He is currently (2012) chairman of the oversight board of the Irish Centre for High-End Computing (ICHEC).

== Internet pioneer ==
In 1984, the National Science Foundation (NSF) began construction of several regional supercomputing centres to provide very high-speed computing resources for the US research community. In 1985 NSF hired Jennings as its first Program Director for Networking to lead the establishment of the National Science Foundation Network (NSFNET) to provide access to the five NSF super-computing centres and to enable sharing of resources and information. Jennings made three critical decisions that shaped the subsequent development of NSFNET:

- that it would be a general-purpose research network, not limited to connection of the supercomputers;
- it would act as the backbone for connection of regional networks at each supercomputing site; and
- it would use the ARPANET's TCP/IP protocols.

Jennings was also actively involved in the start-up of research networks in Europe (European Academic Research Network, EARN – President; EBONE – board member) and Ireland (HEAnet – initial proposal and later board member). He chaired the board and general assembly of the Council of European National Top Level Domain Registries (CENTR) from 1999 to early 2001 and was actively involved in the start-up of the Internet Corporation for Assigned Names and Numbers (ICANN). He was a member of the ICANN Board from 2007 to 2010, serving as vice-chair in 2009–2010.

In April 2014 Jennings was inducted into the Internet Hall of Fame.

== Venture capitalist ==
Jennings is the co-founder of 4th Level Ventures (2002 to 2011) – an Irish Venture Capital company whose primary objective is to invest in companies commercialising the business opportunities that arise from university research in Ireland. He is also an Angel investor, investing in early-stage technology companies. He is currently chairman and/or board member of several small technology companies, and has a wide experience of the issues relating to the start-up, funding, supervision and governance, and survival of early-stage technology companies.

== Opera and classical music ==
He is an opera and classical music enthusiast and is the chairman of the UCD Choral Scholars board of management.

== Selected publications ==
- "The Design of a Real-Time Operating System for a Minicomputer, Part 1", W F C Purser and D M Jennings, Software Practice and Experience, Vol 5 No. 2 (1975), pp. 147–167.
- "Computer Networking for Scientists", Dennis M. Jennings, Lawrence H,. Landweber, Ira H. Fuchs, David J. Farber, and W. Richards Adrion, Science, Vol. 231 No. 4741 (28 February 1986), pp. 943–950.
- "Research computer networks and their interconnection", L H Landweber, D M Jennings, and I Fuchs, IEEE Communications Magazine, Vol. 24, no. 6 (1986), pp. 5–17.
- Information Technologies in Support of Research, Dennis M. Jennings, Higher Education Management, v2 n3 (1990), pp. 310–18.

== See also ==
- List of Internet pioneers
