= Van Houwelingen =

van Houwelingen is a Dutch toponymic surname. "Houwelingen" may refer to nl:Houweningen a town in the Grote Hollandse Waard, which flooded at the 1421 St. Elizabeth's flood. Notable people with the surname include:

- Adri van Houwelingen (born 1953), Dutch cyclist
- Arie van Houwelingen (born 1931), Dutch cyclist
- Hans van Houwelingen (born 1945), Dutch medical statistician
- Jan van Houwelingen (1939–2013), Dutch politician
- Jan van Houwelingen (born 1955), Dutch cyclist
- Pepijn van Houwelingen (born 1980), Dutch politician
