= Douglas Van Houweling =

Doug Van Houweling
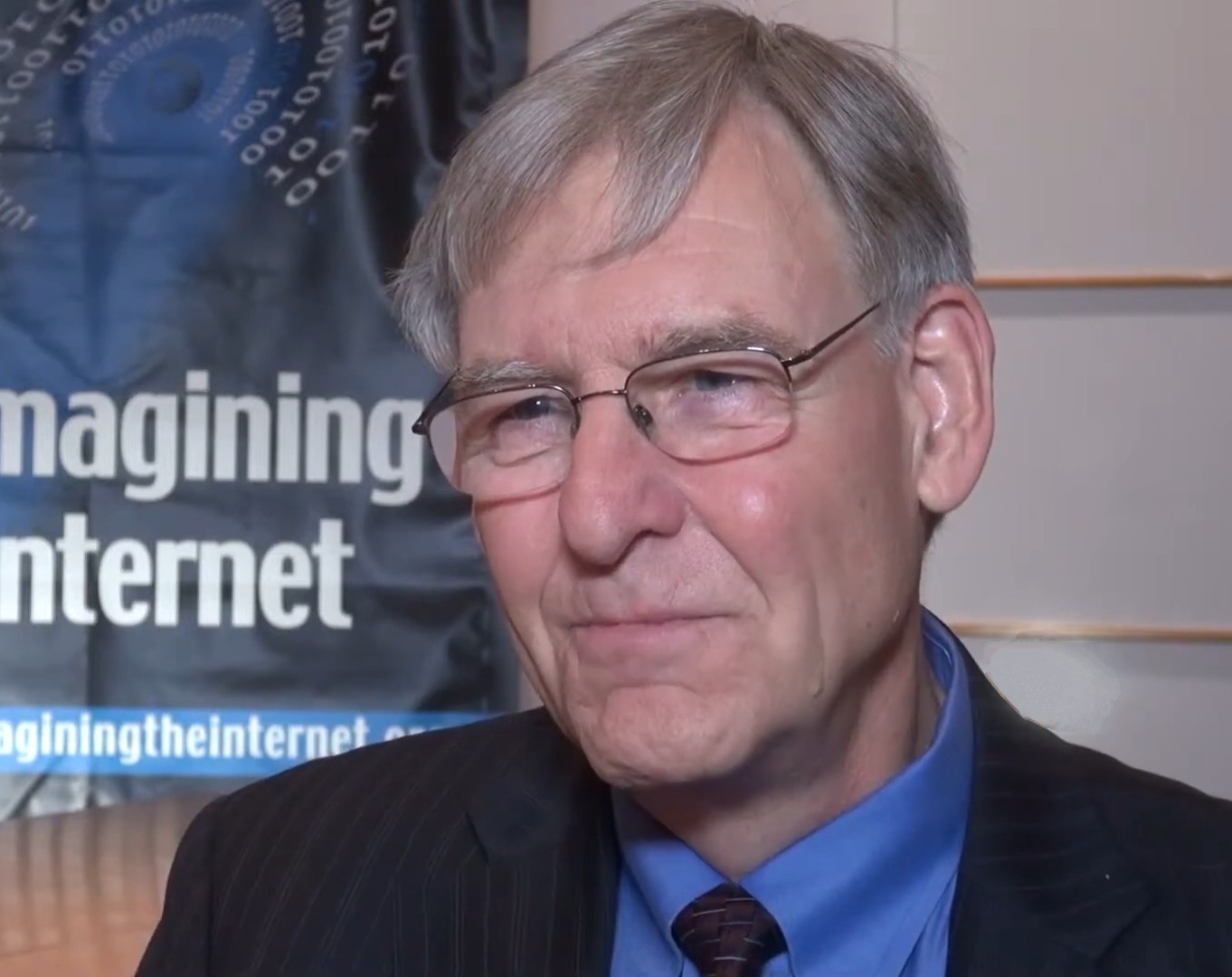
- Born: Douglas Van Houweling; September 20, 1943 (age 82); Kansas City, Missouri
- Citizenship: United States
- Education: Indiana University Bloomington; Iowa State University
- Known for: Internet
- Scientific career
- Fields: Computer Science; Internet
- Workplaces: University of Michigan; School of Information
- Doctoral advisor: Elinor Ostrom

Doug Van Houweling is a professor at the University of Michigan School of Information. He is best known for his contributions to the development and deployment of the Internet. For these accomplishments, he was inducted into the Internet Hall of Fame in 2014. He is also the recipient of the EDUCAUSE 2002 Excellence in Leadership Award, the Iowa State University John V. Atanasoff Discovery Award, the Indiana University Thomas Hart Benton Mural Medallion, and an honorary Doctor of Science from Indiana University in May, 2017. Van Houweling was the Associate Dean for Research and Innovation from 2010 to 2014. Prior to that, he was the Dean for Academic Outreach and Vice Provost for Information technology at the University of Michigan.

Van Houweling has overseen and implemented numerous Internet-related projects including the Internet2 project, the University Corporation for Advanced Internet Development, the National Science Foundation MERIT project, and as Vice Provost for Information Technology at the University of Michigan. He also oversaw the Andrew distributed computing project at Carnegie Mellon University while he was Vice Provost for Computing and Planning.

== Education ==
Doug Van Houweling received his B.A. in government from Iowa State University in 1965. He received his PhD in government from Indiana University Bloomington in 1974, where he was advised by Elinor Ostrom. He held positions in computing services at Cornell University from 1976 to 1981 then moved to Carnegie Mellon University, where he worked from 1981 to 1984. He moved to the University of Michigan as an adjunct professor and vice provost of information technology in 1984. He has been a professor at the University of Michigan School of Information since 1995.

== Research, administration, and consulting ==
Van Houweling has made fundamental contributions to the growth of the Internet and in areas related to information systems planning and management, not-for-profit organization management, strategic planning, simulation models of political and public policy processes, economic models of politics, and technology assessment. While serving as chief information officer at the University of Michigan and as chairman of the board of the MERIT Network, a statewide computing network in Michigan in 1987, he oversaw the operation and management of the NSFnet national backbone, an initiative supported by the National Science Foundation. This became the foundation upon which the global Internet was built. Van Houweling was also chairman of the board of Advanced Network and Services Corporation, a not-for-profit organization that enabled the transition of large-scale Internet capabilities from the higher education and research realm to commercial reality. From 1997 to 2010, he served as chief executive officer of Internet2, the national research and education network for the United States.

He has served on numerous boards of Internet companies and educational institutions such as Consortium for Research in Telecommunications Policy and Strategy, the National Research Council Study, and the National Science Foundation. Van Houweling has also frequently consulted with Internet and technology companies and universities including Apple, General Electric and IBM.

== Selected works ==
- C. Severance, "Doug Van Houweling: Building the NSFNet," in Computer, volume 47, number 4, pages 7–9, April 2014. doi: 10.1109/MC.2014.87 https://ieeexplore.ieee.org/document/6798555/
- "The Obama Administration and Internet Policy," Obama in Office, James A. Thurber, editor, Paradigm Publishers, March 2011.
- "In Search of the Killer App: The Internet2 Experience and the Promise of Advanced Broadband," Ted Hanss and Douglas Van Houweling. Chapter in Austin, Robert D., and Stephen P. Bradley, eds. The Broadband Explosion: Leading Thinkers on the Promise of a Truly Interactive World. Boston: Harvard Business School Press, July, 2005.
- Higher Education in the Digital Age: Technology Issues and Strategies for American Colleges and Universities, James J. Duderstadt, Daniel E. Atkins and Douglas E. Van Houweling. The Oryx Press and the American Council on Education, Westport, Connecticut, December 2002
