= Internet Exchange Point Of Nigeria =

Not-for-profit Internet exchange point

The Internet Exchange Point Of Nigeria (IXPN) is a neutral and not-for-profit Internet exchange point (IXP) founded in 2006 by the Nigerian Communications Commission (NCC) in partnership with the Internet Service Providers Association Of Nigeria (ISPAN). Among other things, IXPN was created to reduce connectivity costs in millions of dollars in offshore internet bandwidth payments, reduce latency from 900 milliseconds to 30 milliseconds for local content, serve as the central point for connecting Higher Educational Institutions (HEIs) towards the development of National Research and Educational Network (NREN). As at April 2022, IXPN is the 5th largest IXP in Africa by number of peers, and 3rd in Africa by traffic according to Packet Clearing House’s IXP directory

== History ==
The first attempt at an IXP in Nigeria - Ibadan Internet Exchange (Ib-IX) - was in 2003. This was a layer-2 infrastructure, precisely, a 24-port 10/100 Mbit/s switch and a route server with two Ibadan based ISPs – SKANNET and Steineng Ltd- as members. The maximum recorded traffic between these two ISPs was about 1 MB. It existed for just about six months but was able to demonstrate to ISPAN members that an IXP was feasible in Nigeria.

In November 2005, during former President Olusegun Obasanjo’s presidency, an IXP setup committee was constituted. The members of this committee were drawn from NCC, ISPAN, Medallion Communications, Interconnect Nigeria Ltd and so on. In early 2006, the Board of NCC, approved a proposal to partly fund the setting-up of Internet eXchange Points in Nigeria. Later that year, IXPN started operations from NECOM House (Marina, Lagos) as its main location; with sub-locations at Victoria Island, Ikeja, Lekki Ikoyi Port Harcourt, Abuja, Enugu and Kano.

== Current ==
IXPN currently has five Points-of-Presence (POPs) in Lagos and four outside Lagos, covering five geo-political zones of Nigeria. IXPN has over 100 Networks connected on its platform, with Mobile Network Operators (MNOs), Internet Service Providers (ISPs), Content Providers, DDoS mitigation services, Web Hosting companies and educational institutions currently exchanging internet traffic at an average rate of 325 Gbit/s.

In 2019, IXPN became regional internet exchange for West Africa with the support of the African Union Commission (AU). In 2016, following a response to a call for proposals issued by AU, IXPN was awarded a grant to be supported to grow to become a regional internet Internet Exchange for West Africa.

In February 2020, IXPN signed a memorandum of understanding with DE-CIX. The first phase of this partnership involves DE-CIX educating local African networks, Internet service providers and content service providers about the benefits of peering and further interconnection services.

== See also ==
- List of Internet exchange points
- List of Internet exchange points by size
