= Bill Woodcock =

Internet infrastructure pioneer (born 1971)

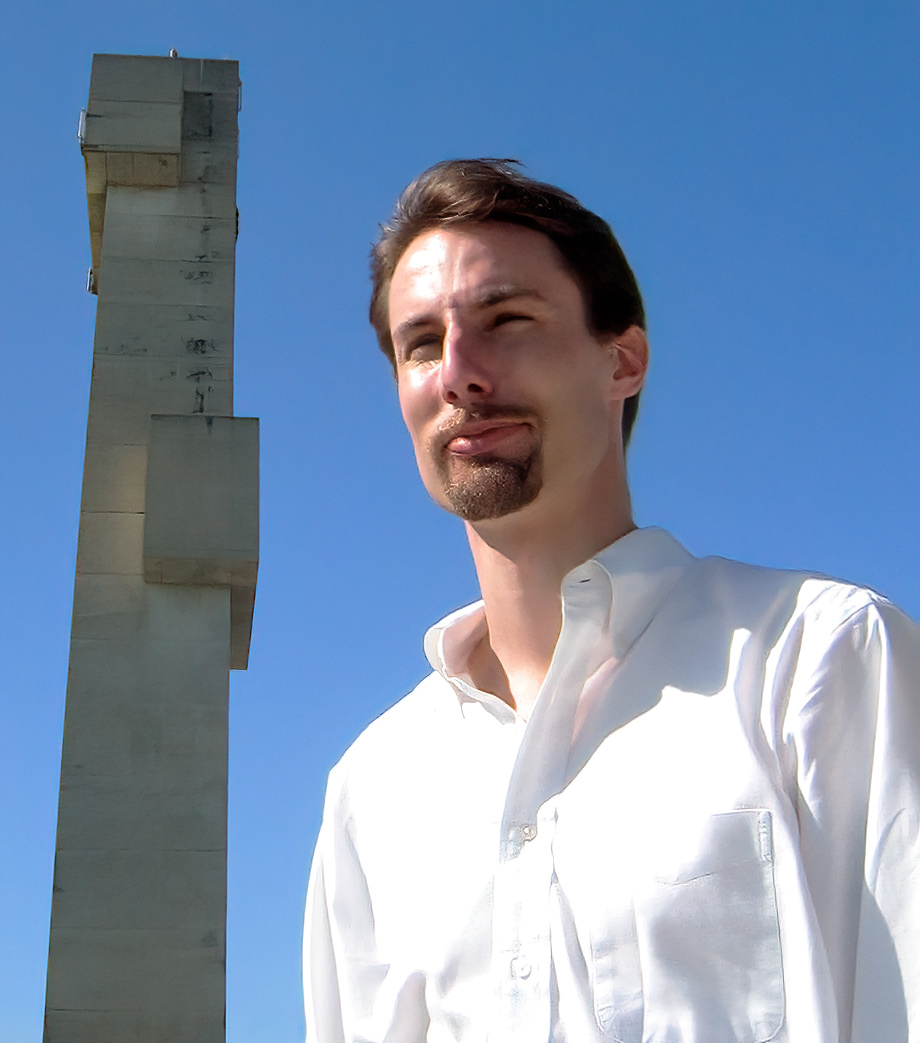
- Woodcock in 2001
- Born: William Edward Woodcock IV; 16 August 1971 (age 55); San Francisco, California, US
- Education: University of California, Santa Cruz
- Known for: Development of anycast routing; Establishment of IXPs; Cyber-defense operations; Internet governance
- Title: Executive Director, Packet Clearing House; President, WoodyNet; Chairman, Quad9; CEO, EcoTruc and EcoRace
- Parents: William Edward Woodcock III; Charlene Louise Mayne
- ASN: 42

William Edward Woodcock IV (born August 16, 1971 in San Francisco, California, US) is the Secretary General of Packet Clearing House, the international organization responsible for providing operational support and security to critical Internet infrastructure, including Internet exchange points and the core of the domain name system; the chairman of the Foundation Council of Quad9; the president of WoodyNet; and the CEO of EcoTruc and EcoRace, companies developing electric vehicle technology for work and motorsport. Bill founded one of the earliest Internet service providers, and is best known for his 1989 development of the anycast routing technique that is now ubiquitous in Internet content distribution networks and the domain name system.

== Activities ==
=== Early electronic prepress ===
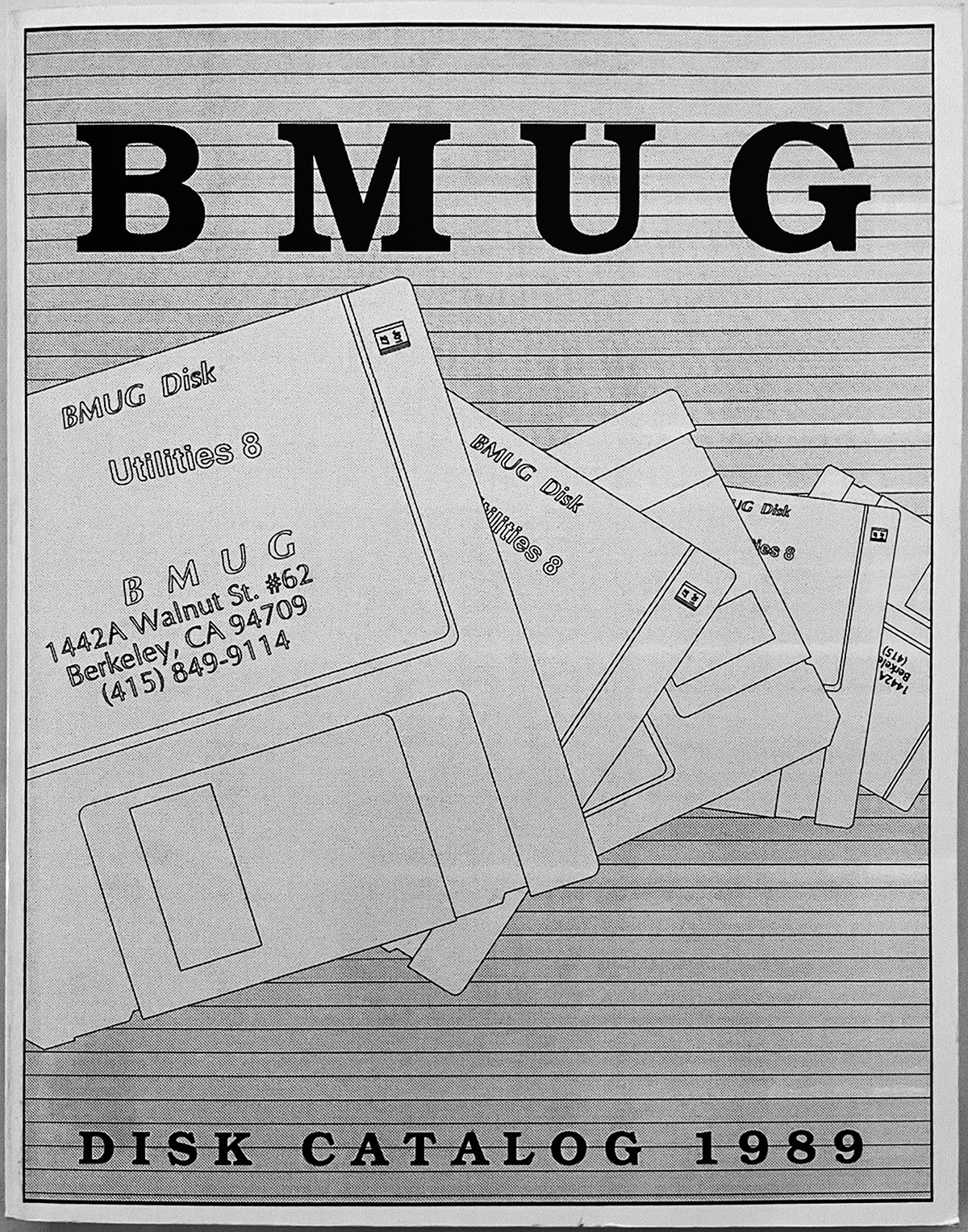
BMUG Disk Catalog 1989, the first known example of direct database-to-negative publishing. Collaborating with programmer Greg Dow, Woodcock published the annual catalog of BMUG's software archive using FileMaker output display templates to image direct to the film from which the plates were burned.

Woodcock entered the computer industry via the advent of desktop publishing. He was doing prepress work for the University of California Press when the Macintosh computer was released in 1984, and he switched to the then-nascent field of desktop publishing and electronic prepress. In 1985, he began working with AppleTalk networks, necessary to interconnect Macintosh computers running desktop publishing software with the digital imagesetters which produce the plates from which books are printed, and by 1986 he was speaking on the subject of desktop publishing and electronic prepress at conferences.

Beginning in 1985, Woodcock volunteered with the Berkeley Macintosh Users Group (BMUG), providing technical assistance to its members, working on the production of its biannual newsletters, and assisting Bernard Aboba with the administration of its FidoNet-node BBS and moderating the global MacNetAdmin echo. In 1989, he collaborated with BMUG Programming SIG chair Greg Dow to produce what may be the first instance of Database publishing: a catalog of BMUG's shareware archive, printed directly from a FileMaker database to negatives on a LinoTronic 300 PostScript imagesetter.

Woodcock continued his interest in publishing through college and beyond, studying Book Arts at the University of California, Santa Cruz Cowell Press under George Kane, doing the illustrations for his book Networking the Macintosh, and subsequently collaborating with his publisher parents to provide book designs and cover art for some of their books. Woodcock was one of the founders of Netsurfer Digest, the first online periodical about the World Wide Web, and served as its production manager from 1994 through 2005.

=== Early Internet engineering ===
In 1987, Woodcock began building the dot-com era Internet backbone network Zocalo, which had its origins in the toasternet he began constructing while working at Farallon Computing in the mid-1980s. When the network grew to encompass Santa Cruz as well as Berkeley in 1989, he began using anycast routing to distribute network traffic between the servers in the two locations. Throughout the 1990s, he continued to pioneer IP anycast IGP and EGP-based topological load-balancing techniques. Together with Mark Kosters he proposed at the 1996 Montreal IEPG that the root DNS servers be migrated to IP anycast, and this work has provided the basis upon which root DNS servers have been deployed since the late 1990s.

In the early 2000s, Woodcock was an early proponent of reputation-based routing security and encapsulated much of that work in the "Prefix-List Sanity Checker" toolset which was used by most of the largest Internet networks to validate proposed BGP routing announcements in the interregnum between the RPSL and RPKI eras.

In 2010 and 2011, with Rick Lamb, who had previously built the signing system that places DNSSEC cryptographic signatures on the DNS root zone, Woodcock built the first global-scale FIPS 140-2 Level 4 DNSSEC signing infrastructure, with locations in Singapore, Zurich, and San Jose. Woodcock has also done networking protocol development work, and has developed networking products for Cisco, Agilent, and Farallon.

=== Cybersecurity and critical infrastructure ===
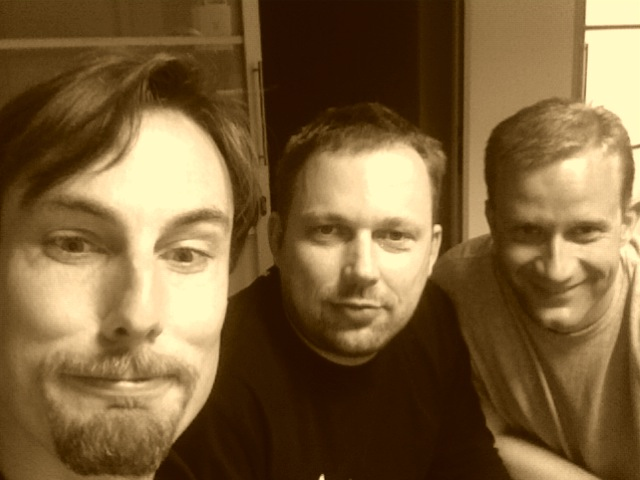
Bill Woodcock, Hillar Aarelaid and Kurtis Lindqvist on the night of Tuesday, May 8, 2007, in the CERT-EE operations center, as the Russian cyber-attack on Estonia began

In 2001, together with Sean Donelan and John Todd, Woodcock constructed the "Inter-Network Operations Center Dial-By-Autonomous-System-Number" (INOC-DBA) infrastructure protection hotline communications system. At its peak, it interconnected more than 2,800 NOCs and CERTs, and was notably the first inter-carrier SIP VoIP network, and the first telephone network of any kind to provide service on all seven continents.

Woodcock was one of the two international liaisons in Estonia assisting Hillar Aarelaid and the CERT-EE during Russia's 2007 cyberattacks on Estonia by coordinating the international effort to intercept and block inbound attack traffic before it reached the Estonian border.

When Russia conducted a subsequent cyber-attack against Georgia in 2008, in parallel with a conventional military attack, Woodcock was widely quoted in the press as an analyst of nation-state cyber warfare, stating that military cyber attacks would likely continue, because "you could fund an entire cyberwarfare campaign for the cost of replacing a tank tread," and that "any modern warfare will include a cyber-warfare component," but cautioning that precise attribution is difficult: "You'll never be able to establish who was sitting in front of a computer from which an attack originates."

In 2017, Woodcock was appointed to the Global Commission on the Stability of Cyberspace, and served on the commission until its successful conclusion in 2019, participating in the drafting of its eight norms related to non-aggression in cyberspace.

In the wake of the six major Caribbean hurricanes of 2017, which included two Category 5 hurricanes and destroyed critical communications infrastructure in ten Caribbean countries, Woodcock worked with Bernadette Lewis, Bevil Wooding and others to establish the Commission on Caribbean Communications Resilience, served as a commissioner for two years, and assisted in the drafting of its final recommendations.

=== Policy positions ===
Woodcock has become an outspoken advocate of regulation of the use of artificial intelligence in the public interest, taking positions against the use of AI to exploit human psychological weaknesses, against delegating "kill chain" decisions to military AI, and regarding AI and increasing socioeconomic inequities, saying, for example,

"The degree of integration of AI into daily life depends very much on wealth. People whose personal digital devices are day-trading for them, doing the grocery shopping, and sending greeting cards on their behalf, are living a different life than those who are worried about missing a day at one of their three jobs due to being sick, losing their job, and being unable to feed their children. AI are not the problem, but the trend toward greater social divide leaves a larger portion of the world's population in poverty and unable to garner any advantage from self-driving cars or robot vacuum cleaners."

...and regarding the use of AI to intermediate human communication through "filter bubbles":

"The single most important factor in improving the quality of digital life and the trajectory of digital interaction is the disintermediation of human communication: The removal of the agents with separate and competing agendas, like Facebook and Twitter, that have positioned themselves between people who could otherwise be engaging directly in civil discourse. This requires decentralization, federation and the empowerment of the users of digital technology to act on their own behalf."

Woodcock advocates in favor of regulation in the public interest, particularly regulation of constrained resources like IPv4 addresses and public rights-of-way. At the same time, he has advocated for permissionless new market entry in cases like those of Internet service providers and Internet exchange points, where no constrained resources are inherently consumed and the value of innovation is high. He has advocated for a nuanced view of "Internet Balkanization" or fragmentation since at least 2013, as in this reference to Brazil's rapid construction of Internet infrastructure:

"Despite the clear benefits of these developments for Brazilians, their government's statements have been shrilly and incorrectly branded as extreme and decried as Soviet socialism by some U.S. media. This is largely due to a misimpression that what Brazil is doing is cutting itself off from the Internet or balkanizing the Internet -- when in reality, it's building more Internet faster. Critics fail to understand that the path Brazil is taking was blazed in the United States. While Brazil may engage in aggressive rhetoric, its actions are sound."

...and has argued in favor of less heated rhetoric regarding national Internet infrastructure initiatives and controls in China, Russia, Egypt, Iran, Georgia, and Estonia as well.

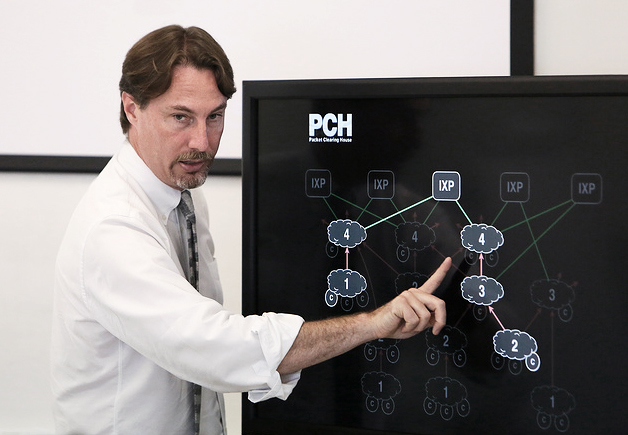
Bill Woodcock lecturing on Internet routing economics, 2018

Woodcock is a noted advocate for competitive telecommunication marketplaces, frequently speaking and publishing on the topics of new market entry and the benefits which increased competition in Internet access markets bring to users, in the form of improved performance and lower costs. These positions have informed and generally been adopted as best-practices by the OECD in its recommendations to member countries on telecommunications regulation and legislation. Supporting that work, in 2011 he produced the first-ever survey of the peering connections between Internet networks, characterizing more than 142,000 such agreements, and followed up with a second survey of 1.9 million peering connections in 2016.

=== Advocacy ===
In 1997 and 1998, Woodcock and J. D. Falk worked with the California legislature to enact the world's first anti-spam legislation, Assembly Bill 1629, which was enacted as California Business and Professions Code 17538.45, and was subsequently used as the basis for the United States federal anti-spam law.

In the wake of the ITU's December 2012 World Conference on International Telecommunications, which he characterized as an attempted take-over of the institutions of Internet governance, Woodcock published a number of secret ITU budget documents and acted as point-person in an effort to redirect USD 11M in US government funds from ITU contributions to support of the multistakeholder model of Internet governance. This effort centered on a "We the People" petition and an explanatory web site, and, although ultimately unsuccessful, received much favorable attention in the press and Internet governance community.

In 2019 and 2020, Woodcock organized the successful opposition to the attempted $1.1bn sale of the .ORG top-level domain to private equity firm Ethos Capital, and serves on the board of directors of the Cooperative Corporation of dot-Org Registrants (CCOR).

In March, 2022, Woodcock was one of the lead authors, along with Bart Groothuis, Eva Kaili, Marina Kaljurand, Steve Crocker, Jeff Moss, Runa Sandvik, John Levine, Moez Chakchouk and some eighty other members of the Internet governance and cybersecurity community, of an open letter entitled Multistakeholder Imposition of Internet Sanctions. The letter outlines a set of principles governing the imposition of Internet-related sanctions and describes the mechanism being built to operationalize the sanction mechanism. The letter was occasioned by a request from the Ukrainian Ministry of Digital Transformation to ICANN and RIPE, requesting that Russia's top-level domains and IP addresses be revoked. The letter advocates more effective sanctions, more narrowly focused on military and propaganda targets, and avoiding collateral effects upon civilians and features a four-page annex evaluating different technical mechanisms by which Internet-related sanctions could be imposed.

== Board memberships ==
=== Current ===
- Packet Clearing House, Director, 1994-2001; Secretary General, 2001–present
- Quad9 Foundation (CH), Chairman of the Foundation Council, 2021–present
- The Internet Sanctions Project, Oversight Board member, 2022–present
- Cooperative Corporation of .ORG Registrants, Director, 2019–present
- DHS CISA Cybersecurity Technical Advisory Council, 2022–present
- CleanerDNS (d.b.a. Quad9) (US), Chairman of the Board, 2016–present
- M3AA Foundation, Trustee, 2014–present

=== Past ===
- American Registry for Internet Numbers, Trustee, 2002-2017; Vice-Chair, 2017
- Global Commission on the Stability of Cyberspace, Commissioner, 2017-2019
- Commission on Caribbean Communications Resilience, Commissioner, 2017-2019
- Consolidated RIR IANA Stewardship Proposal Team North American representative and proposal editor, 2014-2016
- Grenada Ministry of ICT delegation to the ITU Plenipotentiary, Deputy Head of Delegation, 2014
- ICANN DNS Risk Management Framework Working Group, 2011-2013
- Internet Capacity Development Consortium, Director, 2005-2007
- .ORG Public Interest Registry, Advisory Board member, 2005-2007
- City of Berkeley Telecommunications Commission, Commissioner, 2000-2002
- NetProfessional Magazine, Editorial Advisory Board, 1998-unknown
- ISP/Consortium, Director, 1998-1999

== Books and writings ==
Woodcock's published work includes many PCH white-papers, the 1993 McGraw-Hill book Networking the Macintosh, the report of the ANF AppleTalk Tunneling Architectures Working Group, which he chaired in 1993 and 1994, many articles in Network World, MacWorld, MacWEEK, Connections, and other networking journals and periodicals. In addition, he was principal author of the Multicast DNS and Operator Requirements of Infrastructure Management Methods IETF drafts, and contributed to the IP anycast RFC.
