= Aarelaid =

Estonian family name

Aarelaid or Aareleid is an Estonian surname meaning "treasure islet". Notable people with the surname include:

- Aili Aarelaid-Tart (1947–2014), Estonian sociologist and cultural historian
- Hillar Aarelaid (born 1967), Estonian director
- Kai Aareleid (born 1972), Estonian writer
