= Toasternet =

Internet system made of readily available parts

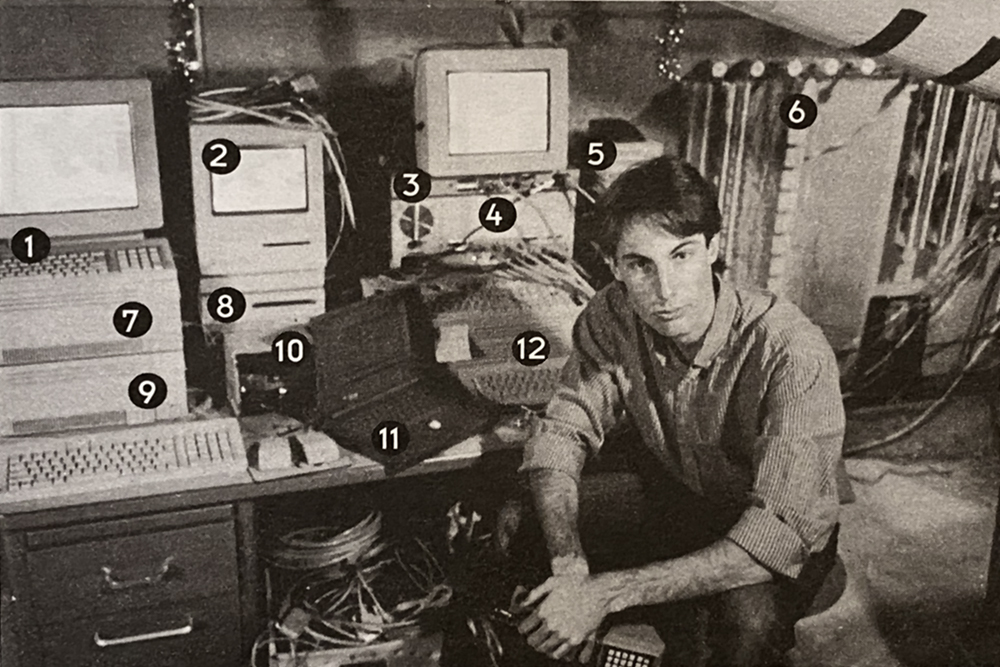
The Toasternet "Zocalo," constructed by Bill Woodcock between 1987 and 1993, which subsequently grew to become the AS715 backbone network across the US and Europe during the dot-com era. Caption numbers: 1) FTP server drive. 2) POP mail spooler. 3) Prototype PPP router being tested. 4) Livingston PortMaster router. 5) Norris Earphone atop a stack of modems. 6) punchdown blocks. 7) HTTP server, AURP router, AFP server, PAP spooler. 8) CD drive. 9) mail, FTP, primary nameserver, shell accounts. 10) news spooling drive. 11) Powerbook serves as a mobile administration console, as well as phone book, etc. 12) news and NFS server, secondary nameserver.

Toasternets were an early-1990s instantiation of the decentralized Internet, featuring open-standards-based federated services, radical decentralization, ad-hoc routing and consisting of many small individual and collective networks rather than a cartel of large commercial Internet service provider networks. Today's community networks and decentralized social networks are the closest modern inheritors of the ethos of the 1991-1994 era Toasternets.

== History ==
The first known use of the word was by Robert Ullmann, then active in the Internet Engineering Task Force developing next-generation Internet addressing and routing protocols. He circulated the documents Toasternet Part I (December 1989) and Toasternet Part II (March 1992) on the IETF mailing list, then published RFCs 1475 and 1476 and the "CATNIP" Internet-Draft in June 1993.

Early toasternet proponent Tim Pozar described a Toasternet as:

"an Internet-connected computer network built very cheaply so as to have a cost that a small business, school or individual can afford. It has been joking said that these networks are so cheap, you can connect everything in sight, including your toaster. Generally speaking, most Toasternets exist to meet a group's or individual's communications needs, rather than profit as a motive."

Pozar, and other early toasternet builders Bill Woodcock and John Gilmore were participants in the cooperative The Little Garden, the first Internet service provider based on the west coast of the United States. Founded and led by Tom Jennings, The Little Garden (named for the Vietnamese restaurant where its foundational meetings were held) was an Internet service provider network built between 1992 and 1996 in the toasternet ethos, and consisting of constituent toasternet members; some individual, and some collective. Many of the initial Little Garden members went on to become founding members of Packet Clearing House, the not-for-profit which now supports core Internet infrastructure globally, but still continues to promulgate the toasternet values of collaborative competition and "permissionless" new market entry.

Writing contemporaneously in Wired, Jonathan Steuer said,

"Toasternets are not actually comprised of toasters and network cable. Rather, the term "toasternet" refers generically to small computer networks built out of cheap and readily available parts. Unlike commercial network service providers, who are motivated primarily by their bottom line, most toasternets exist to meet their members' communication needs -- to get people wired. Toasternets have become increasingly popular as demand for Internet services has outpaced the capabilities of commercial service providers."

Gareth Bronwyn, also writing in Wired in 1993, defined them much more haphazardly, saying that they used "Cheap Internet routers made with old PCs" and coining the umbrella term "grunge computing."

It is worthy of note that, prior to the 1992 privatization of the Internet via Al Gore's National Information Infrastructure plan, the operation of toasternets was not actually legal, since Internet connectivity was supplied to authorized parties (generally defense contractors and research universities) by, and at the expense of, the US Defense Department's Advanced Research Projects Agency, and toasternets extended access to the network beyond the parties authorized to use it.

Many people also linked the name with a much more literal demonstration of SNMP-enabled toasters which had been connected to an Ethernet network by network management software vendor Epilogue, which caught the public's fancy at the time, and received some press coverage.
