= Average per-bit delivery cost =

Cost accounting method

Average per-Bit delivery cost (APBDC) is the cost accounting method by which Internet service providers (ISPs) calculate their cost of goods sold.

== Concept ==
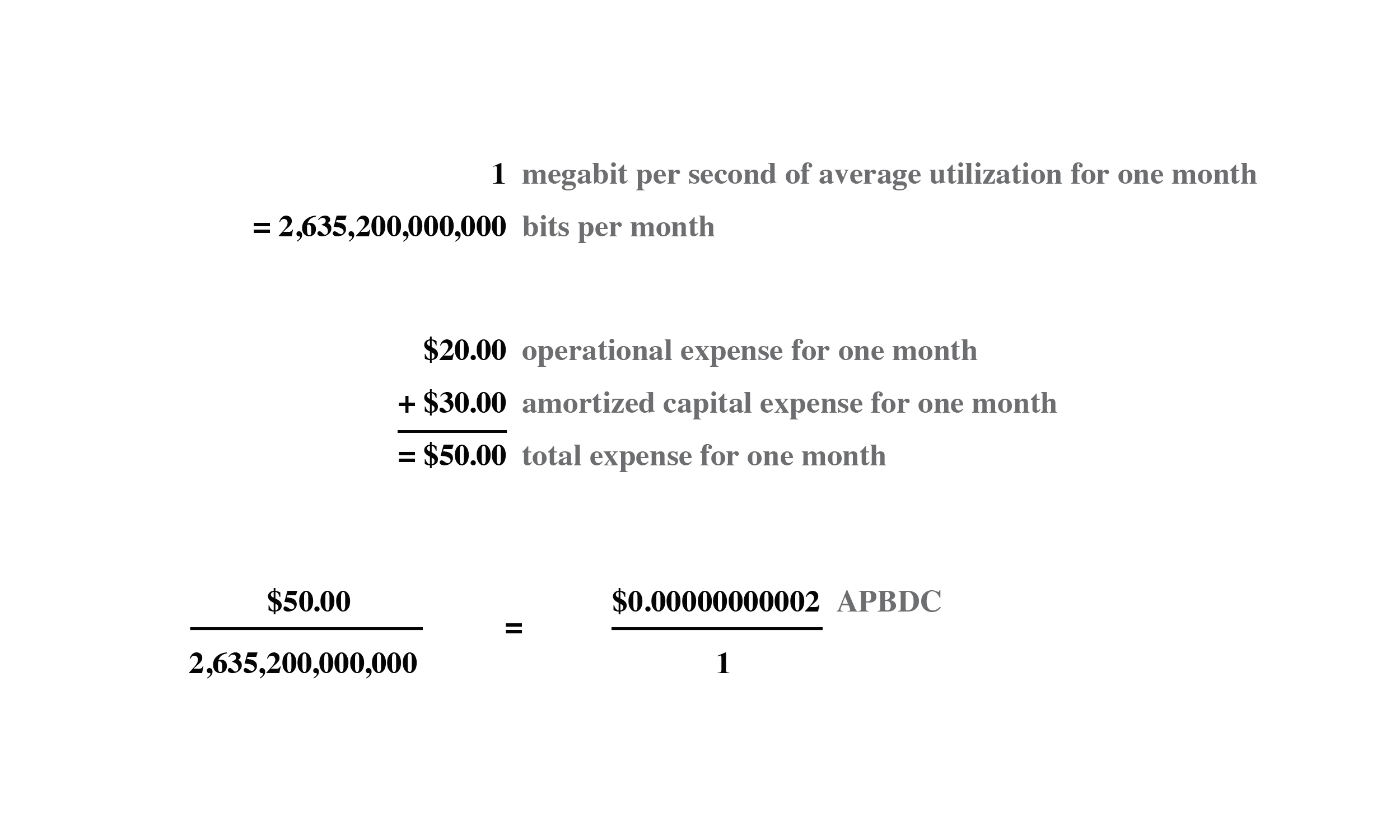
Example of calculation of Average Per-Bit Delivery Cost for a small data-flow.

Average Per-Bit Delivery Cost divides the cost of however many bits were actually modulated across a network or component of a network over a period of time by the total operational and amortized capital expenses associated with the network or component over the same time-period, to produce an average cost for the delivery of each transmitted bit of data. This is contrasted principally with flat-rate and 95th percentile functions, which are typically used for billing customers rather than cost accounting. In typical use, APBDCs of individual links or components of an operating network are compared with the APBDC of the whole, in order to evaluate the efficiency of the components and to track improvements in efficiency.

High APBDC may reflect either a high cost or a low utilization, either of which is detrimental to the price/performance of the network as a whole, and indicates an area that needs attention and improvement. Besides reduction in costs of existing network components, use of already-amortized or less expensive components, and transmission of greater volumes of traffic, fundamental or "revolutionary" changes to the topology of a network, such as the substitution of peering-derived bandwidth for purchased transit, often have substantial impacts on a network's APBDC.

The use of Internet Exchange Points (IXes or IXPs) to disintermediate ISP networks from sources of Internet bandwidth is a typical mechanism by which ISPs reduce their APBDC. Properly-sourced, bandwidth procured directly from its point of production in an IXP has a lower APBDC than bandwidth procured indirectly through an intermediary transit provider.

Average Per-Bit Delivery Cost was first described under that name by Bill Woodcock in 2004, but built upon his previous work on Internet cost calculation, some of which was in collaboration with Andrew Odlyzko in the 1990s and with Zhi-Li Zhang and others in the early 2000s.
