= Database publishing =

Automated Media Production

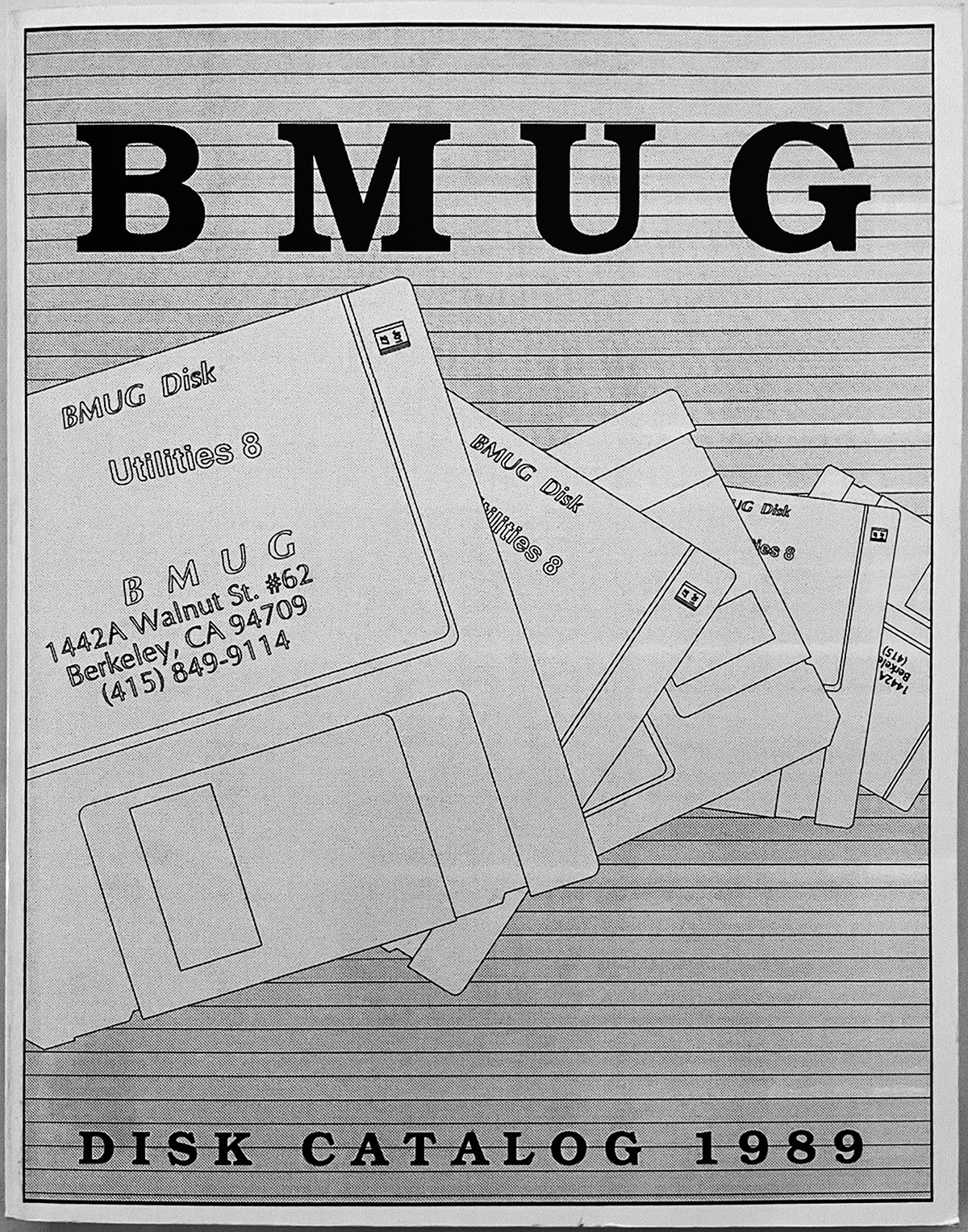
BMUG Disk Catalog 1989, the first known example of direct database-to-negative publishing. Programmer Greg Dow and prepress expert Bill Woodcock published the annual catalog of BMUG's software archive using Nashoba FileMaker output display templates on Macintosh computers to image direct to film from which the plates were burned, on a Linotronic 300 imagesetter. Frontispieces were made in Adobe Illustrator 88 and interleaved in plate compositing. It was set in Adobe Bookman, and printed in grayscale at a 60-line screen for an intentionally minimalist effect.

Database publishing is an area of automated media production in which specialized techniques are used to generate paginated documents from source data residing in traditional databases such as product information management (PIM), digital asset management (DAM), and enterprise resource planning (ERP) platforms. Common examples are mail order catalogues, direct marketing, report generation, price lists and telephone directories. The database content can be in the form of text and pictures but can also contain metadata related to formatting and special rules that may apply to the document generation process. Database publishing can be incorporated into larger workflows as a component, where documents are created, approved, revised and released.

The basic idea is using database contents like product information, article and price information to fill out pre-formatted template documents. Templates are typically created in a normal desktop layout application where certain boxes or text are designated as placeholders. These placeholders are then targeted with new content which flows in from the database. This allows for quick generation of final output and, in case of changes to the database, quickly perform updates, with limited or no manual intervention. This process is facilitated by specialized software solutions that automate the integration of database content into templates, like InBetween software solution. Such software automates the creation of documents such as catalogs and price lists by integrating product data from various sources.

Another model of database publishing is found in many web-to-print sites where users browse templates from an online catalog (such as business cards or brochures), personalize the selected template by filling in a form and then view the rendered result. In this case the initial source of data is from user input, but it is captured in a database so that if the same user revisits the site later, they can resume editing where they left off. The form is then pre-filled from the database-stored variables the user entered before.

The main layout applications for this workflow are Datalogics Pager, Adobe FrameMaker / InDesign, QuarkXPress, Xyvision, Arbortext Advanced Print Publisher (formerly 3B2) and priint:suite. Generally, these layout applications have a corresponding server version, which receives commands via web interfaces rather than desktop interaction. QuarkXPress Server and Adobe InDesign Server both take full advantage of the design features available in their respective desktop versions.

These applications make their broad spectrum of features available for extension and integration with vertical products, that can be developed either internally, through some form of scripting (e.g. JavaScript or AppleScript for InDesign), or externally, through some API and corresponding developer kits.

Other variants of database publishing are the rendering of content for direct PDF output. This approach prevents manual intervention on the final output, since PDF is not (comfortably) editable. This may not be perceived as a limitation in situations like report generation where manual editability is not needed or not desired.

== See also ==
- Desktop publishing
- Dynamic publishing
- Variable data printing
- Web-to-print
