= Bevil Wooding =

Trinidadian technologist and development strategist

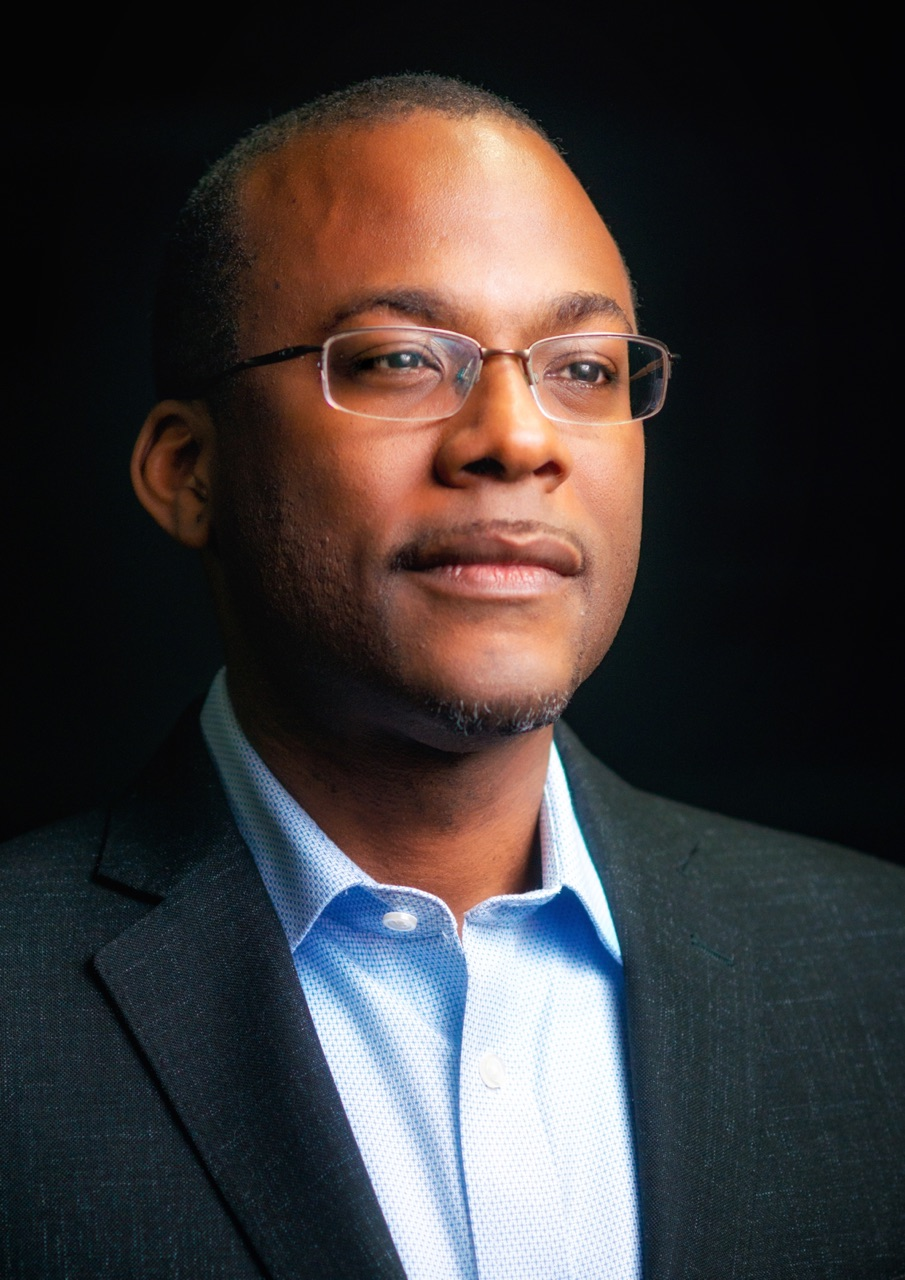
- Education: University of the West Indies
- Occupations: Technologist and Development Strategist
- Organization(s): Congress WBN, ARIN, PCH
- Known for: ICT work in the Caribbean
- Title: Chief Knowledge Officer at Congress WBN; Director of Caribbean Affairs at ARIN; Internet Strategist at PCH

Bevil Wooding is a Trinidadian technologist and development strategist who is the Chief Knowledge Officer at Congress WBN, a UK-registered charity with operations in over 120 countries. He is known for his work in the field of Information and Communications Technology (ICT) in the Caribbean. In 2010, he was named by ICANN as one of the Trusted Community Representatives for the Domain Name System Security Extensions (DNSSEC) root. Wooding advocates for developing states and emerging economies to create policies, build infrastructure, and leverage human resource capacity for technology-enabled development. He has been described as "a visionary who believes that the Caribbean Economy can be enhanced through ICTs and Internet development.”

He is currently the Director of Caribbean Affairs at the American Registry for Internet Numbers (ARIN) and an Internet Strategist for the US-based non-profit Packet Clearing House (PCH). He also serves as a Special Advisor to the Organization of Eastern Caribbean States (OECS) and the Caribbean Telecommunications Union (CTU). His work spans several sectors and includes public awareness, capacity building, and policy development.

Wooding's work with the Caribbean Court of Justice (CCJ) has led to the creation of a special non-profit agency, APEX, to support the implementation of technology innovations within the Caribbean justice system. He currently serves as the executive director of APEX.

== Honours and awards ==
- Wooding was selected as one of 50 individuals to receive a Distinguished Alumni Award from the University of the West Indies St. Augustine campus during their 50th Anniversary celebrations in April 2011. The awardees were selected from a pool of 20,000 graduates in recognition of their leadership and professional contribution to their fields.
- In 2013, he was conferred a lifetime achievement award by the Latin America and Caribbean Network Information Centre (LACNIC) for his dedication, integrity and consistency in the development of an internet and information society; for strengthening the internet connectivity and infrastructure particularly in supporting the development of the Internet exchange points (IXPS) in the Caribbean.
- In 2017, he was awarded with a Distinguished Service Award by the Caribbean Telecommunications Union (CTU) for his contribution to the development of the Internet and digital economy in the Caribbean.
- In November 2017, Wooding received the Caribbean American Heritage Award from the Institute of Caribbean Studies, celebrating his work as "a virtual technology ambassador, evangelist and pioneer".
- He delivered the 23rd Sir Arthur Lewis Memorial Lecture at the opening ceremony of the 2018 Annual Conference with Commercial Banks in St. Kitts, addressing the issue of “Leveraging ICT for Regional Transformation” and empowering youth to contribute in ICT development. This annual lecture series is sponsored and hosted by the Eastern Caribbean Central Bank (ECCB), to honor Sir Arthur Lewis, Nobel Laureate in Economics, and his contribution to Caribbean regional integration.
- Wooding was one of several honorees at an awards ceremony celebrating the 15th anniversary of the Caribbean Internet Governance Forum (CIGF) in May 2019. He received a CIGF Excellence in Internet Governance Award for his contribution to regional technology education, youth outreach, Internet exchange points, and initiatives such as the Caribbean ICT Roadshow, the Caribbean Network Operators Group, the Caribbean Peering and Interconnection Forum, Apex justice technology solutions and BrightPath Foundation digital content programs.
- In July 2019 he was the keynote speaker for the CEO Roundtable at the World Credit Union Conference in Nassau, Bahamas.

== Caribbean initiatives ==
=== Caribbean Network Operators Group (CaribNOG) ===
In 2009, Bevil Wooding and Stephen Lee, with support from the Caribbean Telecommunications Union co-founded the Caribbean Network Operators Group (CaribNOG), as a volunteer-based association and forum for computer network experts and enthusiasts to exchange knowledge and ideas. CaribNOG is one of several Internet network operators' groups worldwide. CaribNOG holds two regional meetings each year where topics such as cloud computing, IPv6 and cybersecurity are discussed. The inaugural regional gathering was held in St. Maarten in August 2010, with participation from across the Caribbean as well as the United Kingdom, North America, Mexico, New Zealand, and Argentina. The 2018 gathering placed emphasis on the role and responsibilities of regional technology professionals in the area of cybersecurity. The first National CyberSecurity Symposium in Belize was organized by Wooding and the CaribNOG team, in collaboration with the Belize Public Utilities Commission and other partners and sponsoring organizations.

=== Caribbean ICT Roadshow ===
Wooding is the co-architect and first Program Director of the Caribbean Telecommunications Union's (CTU) Caribbean ICT Roadshow. The Caribbean ICT Roadshow was launched in 2009 as a public awareness and education campaign designed to demonstrate how technology can be used to transform Caribbean society and economies. The initiative targets governments, entrepreneurs, the elderly, and youth through customized programs ranging from lectures to hands-on workshops and panel discussions. As of 2018, there have been 23 editions of the CTU Caribbean ICT Roadshow in 18 countries.

=== Internet Exchange Points (IXPs) in the Caribbean ===
In his role as an Internet Strategist for Packet Clearing House, Wooding has worked to raise awareness of and advance investment and development in Internet exchange points (IXPs) across the Caribbean. Instead of Caribbean countries relying on international exchange points to carry local data between Internet service providers (ISPs), developing local IXPs can help countries conserve operating costs, boost digital security, improve internet quality, and increase internet access. He has contributed to the establishment of IXPs in Barbados, Belize, BVI, Dominica, Grenada, Jamaica, St Lucia, St Vincent and the Grenadines, and Trinidad and Tobago. At the launch of the first IXP in Belize, Wooding stated that this type of internet infrastructural development is a “small but vital step in the journey toward the development of the Belizean and the Caribbean Internet Economy”.

=== Caribbean Peering and Interconnection Forum (CarPIF) ===
Wooding co-founded the Caribbean Peering and Interconnection Forum (CarPIF), a regional event to bring together senior decision makers from internet service providers, cloud providers, and content delivery networks. He describes CarPIF as “where the economic underpinnings of the traffic exchange and peering relationships that define the Internet are discussed using Caribbean data and Caribbean examples, to a Caribbean audience.” CarPIF addresses challenges to internet connectivity, access and affordability. The inaugural event was held in Barbados in 2015. Since then, host countries have included Curaçao, St. Maarten, and Belize.

=== Network resilience and cybersecurity ===
Network resilience and cybersecurity have been high priorities for Wooding, who has conducted numerous workshops and presentations raising awareness about the threats facing the Caribbean and the work of organizations such as CTU, CaribNOG and ARIN to build local capacity, strengthen networks, and protect the regional internet. Resilience refers to “the ability of a network to maintain acceptable levels of service in the face of a range of challenges, including cyber-attacks and natural disasters, and even user-errors.” Made up of numerous small-island states, the Caribbean region is particularly susceptible to the effects of extreme weather events and natural disasters, such as hurricanes.

Through ARIN training events across the region, Wooding has been educating regional agencies about how to strengthen and secure local networks. In 2018, St. Kitts & Nevis became the first in the Caribbean to be assigned its own autonomous system number, or ASN, taking the first step towards network autonomy.

=== Justice sector transformation ===
Wooding together with Sir Dennis Byron is a co-architect of the non-profit agency APEX, established by the Caribbean Court of Justice (CCJ) in 2016. Since then, he has been instrumental in coordinating development and delivery of technology for Caribbean courts and the justice sector in the region. APEX technology has been implemented in several countries, including Barbados, Belize, Guyana, St. Vincent and the Grenadines, and Trinidad and Tobago for electronic filing, case management and court performance management.

=== Educational initiatives ===
==== Technology education ====
In 2006, Wooding founded the BrightPath Foundation, a non-profit organization providing values-based technology and digital content training. He serves as executive director with oversight for current initiatives including mobile app development, classroom technologies, digital publishing, and photography training. In 2012 he coordinated the development and implementation of the BrightPath Jumpstart program, an initiative that brings high school students together with practicing professionals who provide mentorship, training, and ICT industry insight. The program was launched through a pilot project at NorthGate College in St. Augustine, Trinidad.

Following St. Lucia's first Mobile App Development workshop in 2012, the National Youth Council of St. Lucia signed a Memorandum of Understanding with BrightPath Foundation to collaborate on a range of technology education initiatives targeted at the youth. TechLink – a regional program offering hands-on training in digital content creation and related technology skills - was launched in Grenada in November 2013, and by the end of 2014, over 400 educators, entrepreneurs, young people and parents had participated in TechLink events held in Antigua & Barbuda, Barbados, St. Kitts & Nevis, St. Lucia and Trinidad & Tobago.

==== Curriculum development ====
In 2012, Congress WBN signed a Memorandum of Understanding with the Caribbean Examinations Council (CXC), focused on providing values-based leadership and supporting ICT education delivery. Through this partnership, Wooding worked closely with CXC to create the Caribbean's first-ever Digital Media syllabus, along with a training toolkit of instructional videos and resource materials to assist educators with implementing the curriculum in their classrooms. The Digital Media examination was the first to be delivered electronically.
