= MAE-East =

First non-governmental Internet exchange point

The MAE (later, MAE-East) was the first non-governmental Internet Exchange Point (IXP). It began in 1992 with four locations in Washington, D.C., quickly extended to Vienna, Reston, and Ashburn, Virginia; and then subsequently to New York and Miami. Its name stood for "Metropolitan Area Ethernet," and was subsequently backronymed to "Metropolitan Area Exchange, East" upon the establishment of MAE-West in 1994. The MAE predated the National Information Infrastructure plan, which called for the establishment of IXPs throughout the United States. Although it initially had no single central nexus, one eventually formed in the underground parking garage of an office building in Vienna, VA.

== History ==
MAE-East was originally created in 1992, primarily by Scott Yeager of Metropolitan Fiber Systems (MFS) and Rick Adams of UUNET. "A group of network providers in the Virginia area got together over beer one night and decided to connect their networks", said principal MAE-East architect Steven Feldman (MFS). The founding networks were AlterNet (UUNET's backbone service), PSINet and Sprint's International Connections Management (ICM) network. MFS was the service provider offering metropolitan fiber, cross connects and switch ports for the ISPs to interconnect. MAE-East was modeled after FIX East and Fix West. It was established as a Distributed Layer 2 exchange (shared 10-Mbps Ethernet over FOIRL). By February 1993, the 10-Mbps metropolitan Ethernet connected the Sprint Point of presence ("PoP") (hosting Sprint's ICM and AlterNet), College Park PoP (AlterNet and NSFNet), MCI PoP (SURAnet), and WillTel PoP (PSINet). The MAE did not have a multi-lateral peering policy or agreement, so each participant was responsible for independently negotiating their own bilateral peering agreements. There was also no mandatory peering requirement, so no ISP was required to peer with any other.

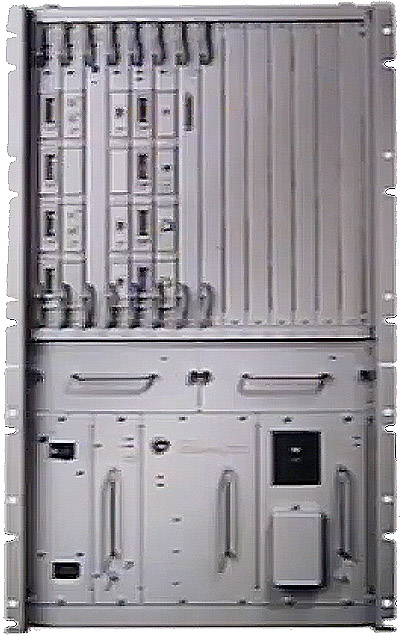
Digital Equipment Gigaswitch with FDDI line cards.

In 1993, the National Science Foundation awarded MFS/MAE-East a grant establishing it as one of the four original Network Access Points, or NAPs. MAE-East then established a collocation facility at 1919 Gallows Road in Vienna, in a cinder-block room in the underground P1 parking garage. The MAE upgraded to switched Ethernet and shared FDDI in Fall 1994, growing to seven DEC GigaSwitches. FDDI ports were available at 8100 Boone Blvd (in the MFS offices across the road from Gallows Road), 1919 Gallows Road, and a number of private customer POPs. The GigaSwitch access was limited to 100 Mbps, suffered from head-of-line blocking, reached scaling limits, and began to suffer outages. MAE-East FDDI was closed to new customers after 1998 and was shut down in February 2001.

MAE-East ATM was intended to be a successor to the FDDI. MAE-East ATM was trialed in 1997 and went into production in 1998. ATM allowed for higher-speed access (e.g., 155mbps-622mbps) and Private Virtual Connections (PVCs), which was conceived of as a solution to some problems in which a single connected network could spread to affect the entire exchange. Frame Relay Access was added in 2002-2003 (155 mbps-2.5 gbps). In 2003, MAE-East ATM/Frame facilities were located at Boone Blvd, Sunrise Blvd, Tyco Road and Ashburn VA.

By the time it closed down in 2009, many of the ISPs previously connected to MAE-East had moved to Equinix Ashburn, a nearby Internet exchange which used exclusively gigabit Ethernet as its layer-2 protocol.

== See also ==
- MAE-West
- Internet Exchange Point (IXP)
- Federal Internet Exchange (FIX)
- Commercial Internet eXchange (CIX)
- Network Access Point (NAP)
