= Bart Groothuis =

Dutch politician and cybersecurity expert

Bart Groothuis MEP
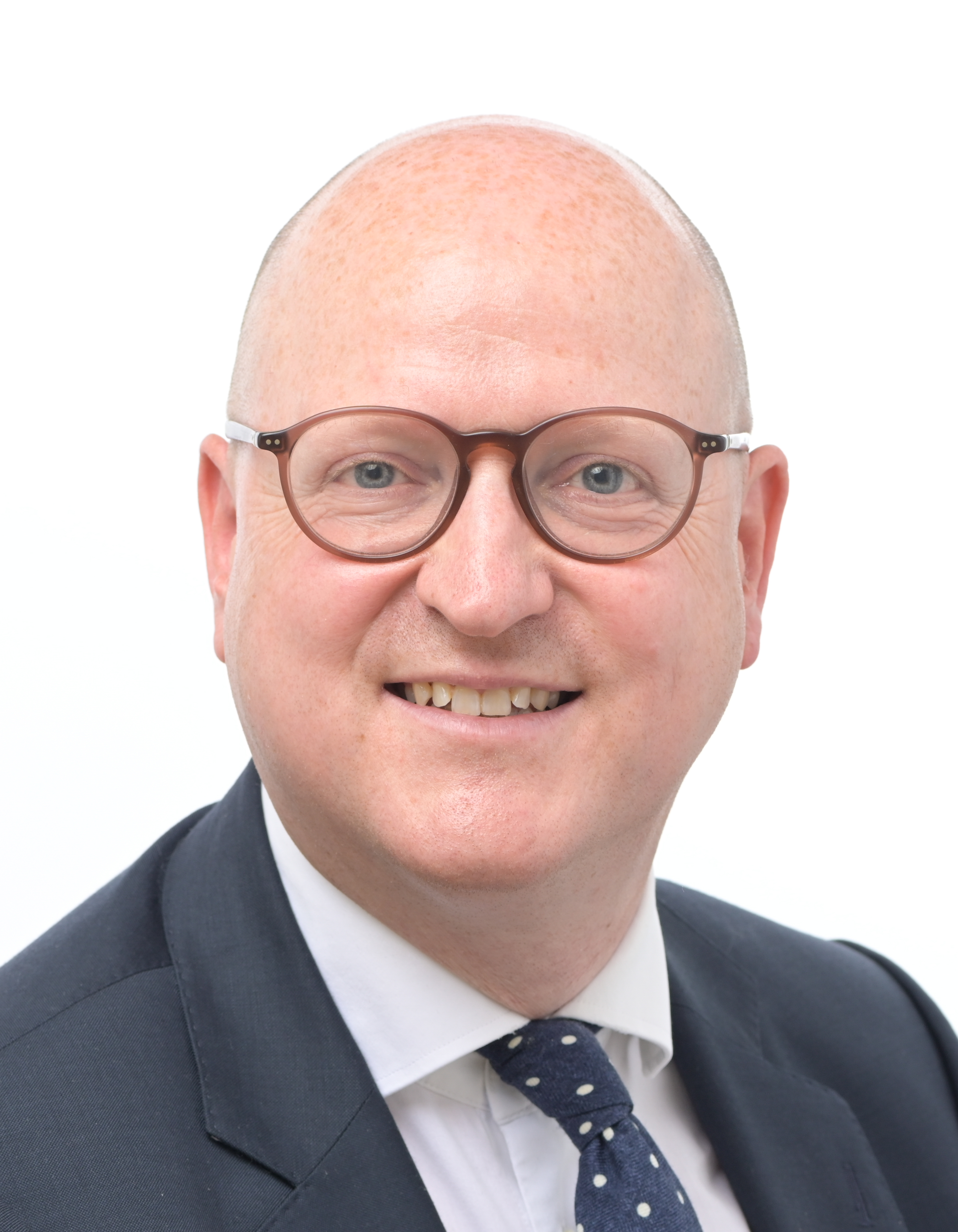

Member of the European Parliament for the Netherlands
- Incumbent
- Assumed office 1 February 2020
- Parliamentary group: Renew Europe

Personal details
- Born: Bart Groothuis; 1 January 1981 (age 45) Reutum, Netherlands
- Party: Netherlands: People's Party for Freedom and Democracy; EU: Alliance of Liberals and Democrats for Europe Party
- Children: 2
- Education: Radboud University
- Website: bartgroothuis.vvd.nl

Bart Groothuis (born 1 January 1981) is a Dutch politician serving as a Member of the European Parliament (MEP) since 2020. He is a member of the Dutch conservative-liberal People's Party for Freedom and Democracy (VVD) and the Alliance of Liberals and Democrats for Europe Party, which are both part of the European political group Renew Europe.

He worked for politician Henk Kamp and as a cybersecurity expert at the Ministry of Defence before receiving a seat in the European Parliament as a result of Brexit in February 2020.

== Education and early career ==
Groothuis was born on 1 January 1981 and grew up in Reutum, in Overijssel, where his parents owned a local handyman and retail business. Groothuis attended Canisius high school. Groothuis studied economics and history at Radboud University Nijmegen, graduating in 2006, and international relations at the Netherlands Institute of International Relations Clingendael in 2006. While a student, he was a member of the Youth Organisation Freedom and Democracy, and adjunct of the VVD.

His first job, between 2007 and 2009, was as personal assistant of Henk Kamp (VVD), who was then a member of the Dutch House of Representatives. Groothuis joined the Afghanistan team of the Ministry of Defence thereafter. There, he served as the interim-director of the cyber security bureau from April 2013 until June 2014, when he became the permanent director. Besides, he co-authored the VVD's election program for the 2010 general election.

== European Parliament ==
During the May 2019 European Parliament election, Groothuis was placed fourth on the VVD's party list. He was also on the election program commission. His party won four seats, and Groothuis himself received 21,353 preference votes, enough to meet the preference threshold. However, Liesje Schreinemacher, who was fifth on the party list, rose one spot, because she had more votes, resulting in Groothuis not being elected. When the United Kingdom left the European Union on 31 January 2020, the Netherlands received three of its seats. The Kiesraad decided to allocate these seats by treating them as restzetels (nl) from the last European Parliament election. One of those seats went to Groothuis, who was installed on 11 February and left his job at the Defense Ministry. His term started retroactively on 1 February. Within his party, Groothuis is the spokesperson for defense, technology, geopolitics, energy, industry, digitization, and cyber.

When news publications including The New York Times reported in April 2020 that conclusions about Chinese disinformation had been toned down in a European report under Chinese pressure, Groothuis wrote a letter to Josep Borrell asking for an explanation. His letter was also signed by a number of other MEPs. In addition, he said that he wanted the European Union to trace and sanction the people responsible for Chinese trolls and bots. Groothuis was appointed the parliament's cybersecurity rapporteur to work on a revised NIS Directive, a set of cybersecurity regulations, called NIS2. The new directive was intended to expand the regulations to new sectors and to make it easier for countries and companies to share information about cybersecurity threats. Groothuis told that they can be reluctant to share threats because of the General Data Protection Regulation. Besides, the NIS2 Directive includes fines for companies that do not protect themselves sufficiently against cyber attacks. The directive was adopted by the European Parliament on 10 November 2022.

Following the 2022 Russian invasion of Ukraine, Groothuis called for more defense cooperation in Europe. He proposed to spend €200 billion of the European Union's (EU) COVID-19 pandemic fund on defense, and he was in favor of the establishment of a European Security Council, not connected to the EU, in the long term. In March 2022, Groothuis was one of the lead authors, along with Bill Woodcock, Eva Kaili, Steve Crocker, Marina Kaljurand, Jeff Moss, Runa Sandvik, John Levine, Moez Chakchouk and some forty other members of the Internet governance and cybersecurity community, of an open letter entitled Multistakeholder Imposition of Internet Sanctions. The letter outlines a set of principles governing the imposition of Internet-related sanctions, and describes the mechanism being built to operationalize the sanction mechanism. The letter was occasioned by a request from the Ukrainian Ministry of Digital Transformation to ICANN and RIPE, requesting that Russia's top-level domains and IP addresses be revoked. The letter advocates more effective sanctions, more narrowly focused on military and propaganda targets, and avoiding collateral effects upon civilians.

In early 2023, Groothuis was among a number of people and organizations that were sanctioned by the Iranian government for supporting and encouraging terrorism. This was in response to European sanctions against the regime following its crackdown of the Mahsa Amini protests. Groothuis had advocated designating the Islamic Revolutionary Guard Corps as a terrorist organization.

He was re-elected in June 2024 as the VVD's second candidate, when the party secured four seats. His focus has since been on technology, cyber, defense, economic resilience, Iran, and the ASEAN countries.

=== Committees and delegations ===
- Delegation for relations with Iran (member since March 2020, vice-chair since July 2020)
- Committee on Industry, Research and Energy (member since March 2020)
- Special Committee on Foreign Interference in all Democratic Processes in the European Union, including Disinformation (member since September 2020)
- Committee on Foreign Affairs (substitute member since February 2020)
- Subcommittee on Security and Defence (substitute member since February 2020)
- Delegation for relations with the NATO Parliamentary Assembly (substitute member since February 2020)

== Political positions ==
Groothuis has voiced the opinion that European legislation surrounding digitization is lagging behind the innovations and that the European tech sector has fallen behind those of other parts of the world. He opposes becoming technologically dependent on countries like China in a time when power is determined increasingly by technology. He has called for European investments to reverse course. Groothuis also advocates a strong European defense to deter attacks, but he has opposed a European army.

== Personal life ==
Groothuis has been living in the South Holland town Voorburg since the late 2000s. He has a wife, whom he met in 2004, and two daughters. In his youth, Groothuis played football at the local club VV Reutum. He is a member of a local chapter of Lions Club.

== Electoral history ==
Electoral history of Bart Groothuis
Year	Body	Party	Pos.	Votes	Result		Ref.
Year	Body	Party	Pos.	Votes	Party seats	Individual	Ref.
2024	European Parliament	VVD	2	107,714	4	Won	
