= MAE-West =

Internet exchange point serving California, US

MAE-West was an Internet exchange point located on the west coast of the United States in Silicon Valley, in the south San Francisco Bay Area in California. It was established in November, 1994. Its name officially stands for "Metropolitan Area Exchange, West", although it was a humorous reference to the name of the actress Mae West and to the original MAE in the Washington, D.C. metro area, which was thereafter known as "MAE-East."

The exchange was a dual Fiber Distributed Data Interface (FDDI) ring, bridged between two locations, one in downtown San Jose, operated by Metropolitan Fiber Systems (MFS) and catering principally to smaller networks, and the second operated by NASA at Moffett Field, 12 miles (19 km) to the northwest, and catering principally to larger networks, since it had annual terms (rather than the monthly terms and service level agreement available at the MFS location) and more restrictive access policies. The MFS side was constructed by Steven Feldman, and the NASA side by Bobby Cates and Lance Tatman.

Its San Jose facility was housed in the Market Post Tower. Built in 1985, Market Post Tower, also known as the Gold Building, is a 15-story building located at 55 South Market at the corner Post Street in downtown San Jose, California.

According to its website, "MAE West is interconnected with the Ames Internet Exchange, operated by NASA at the Ames Research Center. This connection is currently two OC3c circuits directly between the FDDI switches at each end."

In the 1990s, MAE-West was operated by MCI Worldcom and was the second-busiest exchange point on the internet, handling, by some estimates, as much as 40% of the nation's Internet traffic. As of 2023, its facilities were operated by CoreSite.

== See also ==
- MAE-East
- Internet Exchange Point (IXP)
- Federal Internet Exchange (FIX)
- Commercial Internet eXchange (CIX)
