= INOC-DBA =

Infrastructure-protection hotline communications system

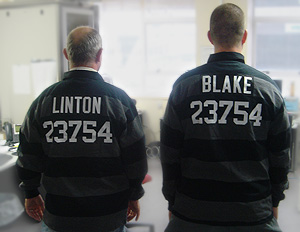
The INOC-DBA name-to-number distributed directory: Dial an Autonomous System Number to reach the network operations center responsible for that network. In this photo, Andy Linton and Simon Blake, of the Citylink fiber network in New Zealand, wear jerseys displaying their dialable autonomous system number, 23754.

The INOC-DBA (Inter-Network Operations Center Dial-By-ASN) hotline phone system was a global voice telephony network that connects the network operations centers and security incident response teams of critical Internet infrastructure providers such as backbone carriers, Internet service providers, and Internet exchanges as well as critical individuals within the policy, regulatory, Internet governance, security and vendor communities. It was built by Packet Clearing House in 2001, was publicly announced at NANOG in October 2002, and the secretariat function was transferred from PCH to the Brazilian CERT in 2015.

INOC-DBA was a closed system, ensuring secure and authenticated communications, and uses a combination of redundant directory services and direct peer-to-peer communications between stations to create a resilient, high-survivability network. It carries both routine operational traffic and emergency-response traffic. The INOC-DBA network uses IETF-standard SIP Voice over IP protocols to ensure interoperability between thousands of users across more than 2,800 NOCs and CERTs, which use dozens of different varieties of station and switch devices. It was the first production implementation of inter-carrier SIP telephony, when voice over IP had previously consisted exclusively of H.323 gateway-to-gateway call transport. INOC-DBA became the first telephone network of any kind to provide service on all seven continents when Michael Holstine of Raytheon Polar Services installed terminals at the South Pole Station in March 2001.
