= Isaac Ben-Israel =

Israeli military scientist

- יִצְחָק בֶּן יִשְׂרָאֵל
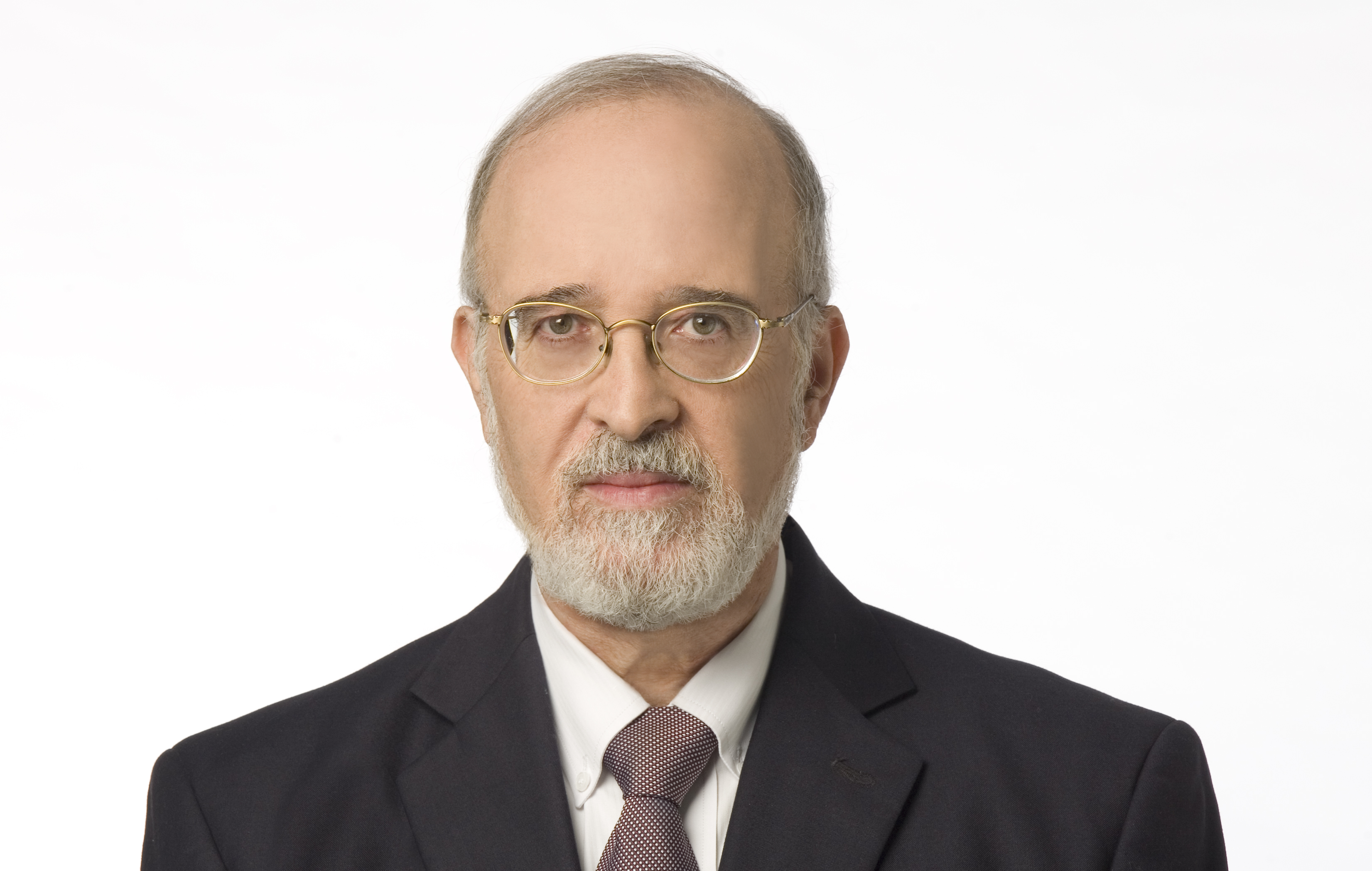

Faction represented in the Knesset
- 2007–2009: Kadima

Personal details
- Born: 26 July 1949 (age 77) Tel Aviv, Israel

Isaac Ben-Israel (Hebrew: יִצְחָק בֶּן יִשְׂרָאֵל, lit. 'Isaac, son of Israel'; born 26 July 1949) is an Israeli military scientist, general, politician and state official, serving as a member of the Knesset for Kadima between 2007 and 2009. He also served as the chairman of the Israeli Space Agency and the National Council for Research and Development from 2005 to 2022 and as chief Cybernetics adviser to PM Netanyahu from 2010 to 2012.

== Biography ==
Ben-Israel finished his studies at the Herzliya Hebrew High School in 1967, and was soon enlisted into the IDF under the Academic Reserve program in which he completed a B.SC. in mathematics and physics. During his military service he earned a Ph.D. in philosophy from Tel-Aviv University in 1988. His last position in the IDF was as the head of the Analysis and Assessment Division of the Israeli Air Force Air Intelligence Directorate's Operations Research Branch. From 2000 to 2002, he was a member of the board of directors of Israel Aircraft Industries. He is also a member of the board of the Israel Corp.; the research and development advisory board of Teva Pharmaceutical Industries; the Fisher Institute for Air and Space Strategic Studies; the advisory council of the Technion's Neaman Institute for Advanced Studies in Science and Technology; the academic council of Tel-Aviv Academic College of Engineering; the Interdisciplinary Center for Technological Analysis and forecasting (Tel-Aviv Univ.); and the National Committee for Information Society Technology. In 2003, he founded RAY-TOP (Technology Opportunities) Ltd., a Defense consultancy firm.

In 2017, Ben-Israel was appointed to the Global Commission on the Stability of Cyberspace, and served on the commission until its successful conclusion in 2019, participating in the drafting of its eight norms related to non-aggression in cyberspace.

From 2005 to 2022, he served as the chairman of the Israeli Space Agency and the National Council for Research and Development, under the auspices of the Ministry of Science, Technology and Space of Israel. He finished his service in the IDF ranked General, serving as head of the military Administration for the Development of Weapons and the Technological Industry. Between 2010 and 2012 he served as chief Cybernetics adviser to PM Netanyahu, during which period he founded the National Cyber Bureau in the PM office and launched the National Cyber Initiative. Ben-Israel is now head of the Security Studies program in Tel Aviv University, where he also heads the annual international Cyber Security conference. Between 2007 and 2009 he served as a member of the Knesset for Kadima. Ben-Israel is one of Israel's top experts on Space, Cyber and technological related security. He holds a PhD in philosophy and a BSc in physics and mathematics from Tel Aviv University. In 2020, he declared that COVID-19 would play itself out within seventy days, regardless of intervention levels.

== Support for the Nautilus MTHEL ==
Ben-Israel has been a staunch supporter of —and by extension, critic of the Israeli government's failure to continue to develop and implement after United States funding was withdrawn from— the Nautilus Mobile Tactical High Energy Laser (MTHEL) to serve as a central component of the Israeli Air Defense Network against high-trajectory attacks, such as by Katyusha and Qassam rockets from Southern Lebanon and the Palestinian territories, respectively. He reiterated these arguments during the 2006 Israel-Gaza conflict and the 2006 Israel-Lebanon conflict, and called for increasing the military budget of Israel with a focus on advanced technology, including reviving the MTHEL program.

=== Politics ===
In the 2006 Knesset elections, he was placed 31st on Kadima's list, but missed out on a seat when the party won only 29 seats. However, after Shimon Peres resigned his seat in the Knesset to become President, Ben-Israel replaced him on 25 June 2007. He lost his seat in the February 2009 elections.

== Awards ==
Ben-Israel has received many awards for his contributions to Israeli defense and intelligence doctrine. He is the author of Dialogues on Science and Defense (1989) and The Philosophy of Intelligence (1999).

- 1972: The Israel Defense Prize — for developing a bombing system for the F-4 Phantom II
- 1976: The Israeli Air Force Prize — for developing a computerized control and supervision system
- 1984: The Head of the Intelligence Directorate Prize — "for "creative thought"
- 1989: Itzhak-Sade Prize for Military Literature — for his book Dialogues on Science and Defense
- 2001: The Israel Defense Prize — a second time, for developing weapon systems
- 2002: The Singapore Defense Technology Distinguished Award — for "outstanding contribution to bilateral defense relations between Israel and Singapore for his contribution to Defense relations between Israel and Singapore"
