= Ibadan Internet Exchange =

Internet exchange point in Nigeria

- Full name: Ibadan Internet Exchange
- Abbreviation: IBIX
- Founded: 2003
- Location: Ibadan, Nigeria
- Website: Official website

The Ibadan Internet Exchange (IBIX) is Nigeria's first Internet exchange point (IXP), a neutral, not-for-profit arrangement, which was commissioned in late March 2003 by the two founding ISPs Steineng Ltd. and SKANNET, both located in Ibadan. The exchange setup was facilitated by Fisayo Adeleke (Network Administrator, Steineng Ltd.) and Sunday Folayan (MD, SKANNET) representing the two Internet service providers (ISPs). It was hoped that the exchange point will facilitate high-speed and reliable exchange of local Internet traffic in Ibadan such that participating members can maximize their international Internet connectivity. A second aim was to prove to the over 30-member Nigeria ISP Association that an exchange point was feasible if members would come together, discuss and agree on the modalities.

Unfortunately, the exchange lasted for just about six months with a maximum local traffic of 690 kbit/s (quite significant, considering the very low local content in the country) passing through the exchange while it was running. The exchange was indirectly shut down due to Fisayo Adeleke's exit from Steineng, and subsequent exit of the technical contact at SKANNET, Bolanle Akinpelu.

In recent times, several plans have been made at the association level to set up the Lagos Internet Exchange (LagIX), which is believed will have a much wider impact nationally considering the fact that 60%+ of ISPs in Nigeria are located in Lagos.

== See also ==
- List of Internet exchange points
