= Reutum =

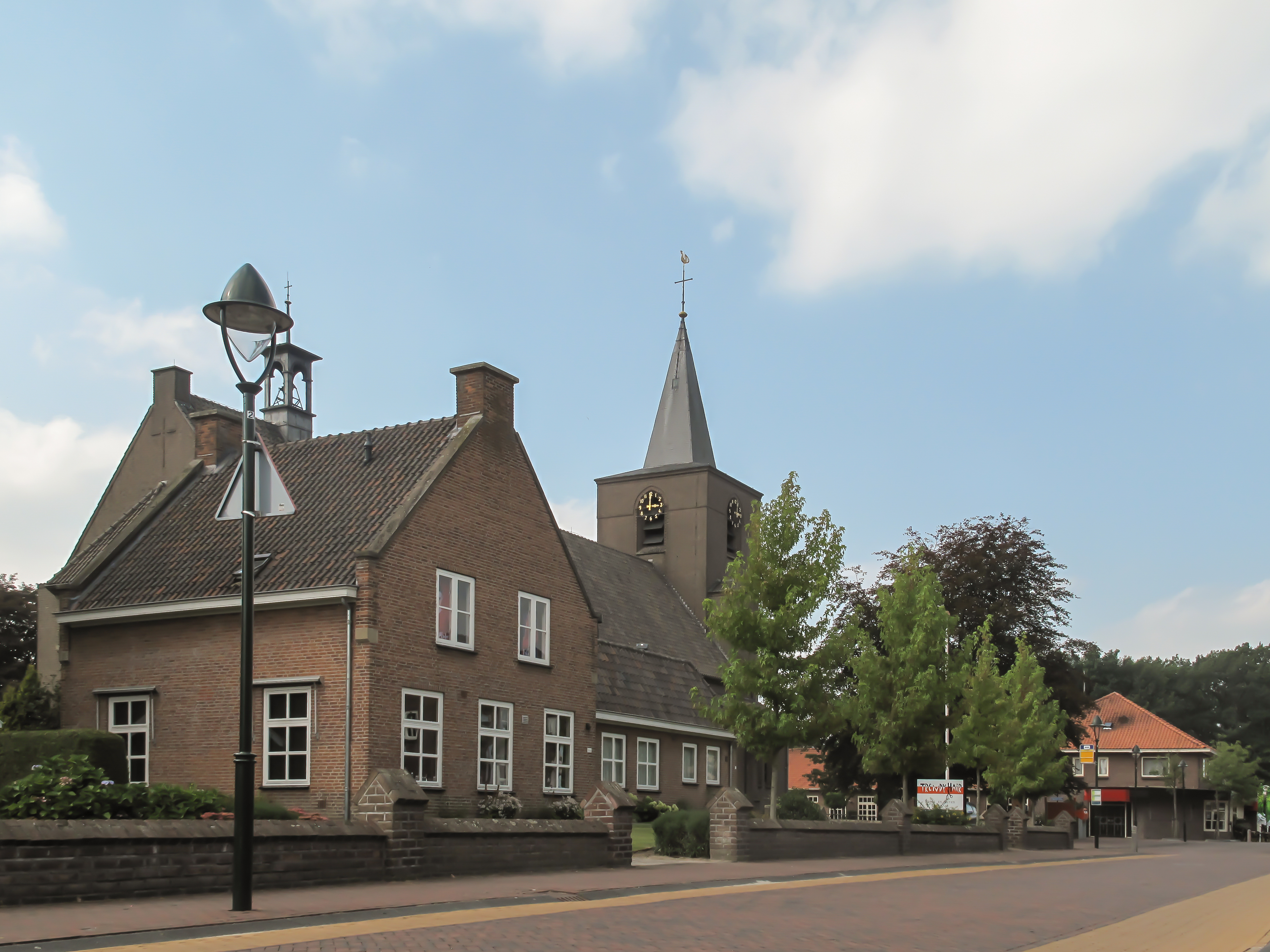
- St. Simon and Judas

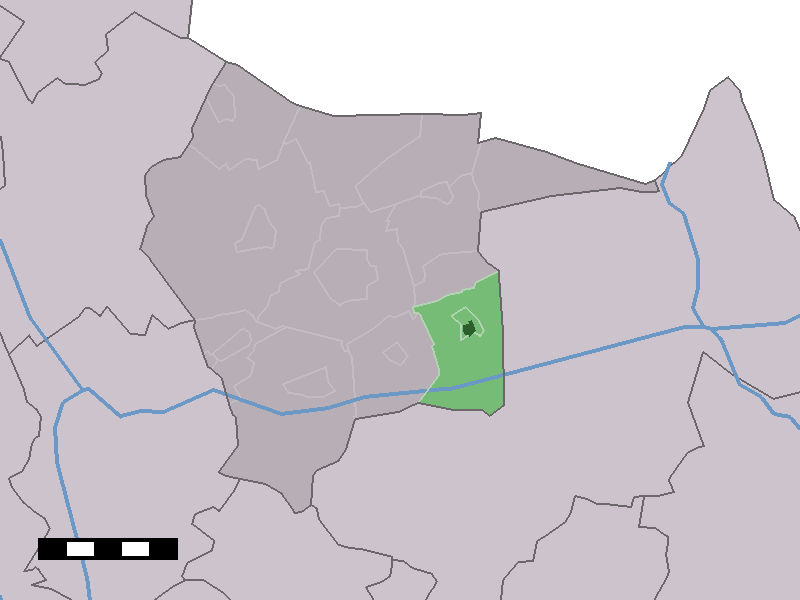
- The town centre (dark green) and the statistical district (light green) of Reutum in the municipality of Tubbergen.

- Location in province of Overijssel in the Netherlands Reutum (Netherlands)
- Country: Netherlands
- Province: Overijssel
- Municipality: Tubbergen

Area
  - Total: 15.43 km^{2} (5.96 sq mi)
- Elevation: 26 m (85 ft)

Population (2021)
  - Total: 1,405
  - Density: 91.06/km^{2} (235.8/sq mi)
- Demonym(s): Reutummers, Pinnsnieders
- Time zone: UTC+1 (CET)
  - Summer (DST): UTC+2 (CEST)
- Postal code: 7667
- Dialing code: 0541

Reutum is a village in the Dutch province of Overijssel. It is a part of the municipality of Tubbergen, and lies about 10 km northwest of Oldenzaal.

Reutum was first attested in the late-10th century as Riatnon, and means "settlement near reed". The village developed along the Reutumse Es. Reutum and neighbour Haarle were home to 670 people in 1840.

The church is dedicated to St. Simon and Judas, and was constructed in 1811. The windmill is called "De Vier Winden" (The four winds), and dates from 1862. Another point of interest is the double sluice in the Almelo-Nordhorn canal.

== Notable people ==
- Bart Groothuis (born 1981), politician

== Gallery ==
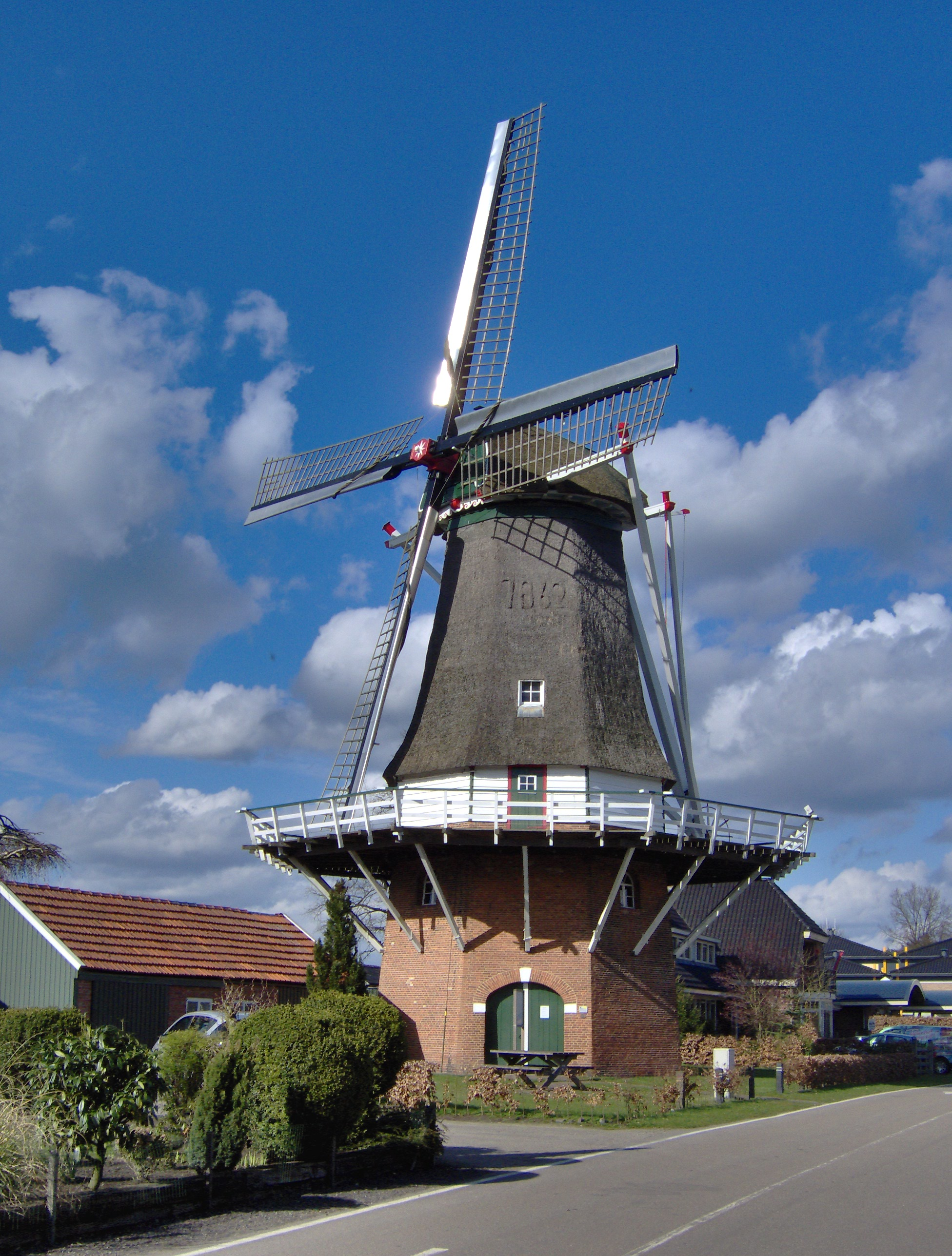
Windmill De Vier Winden

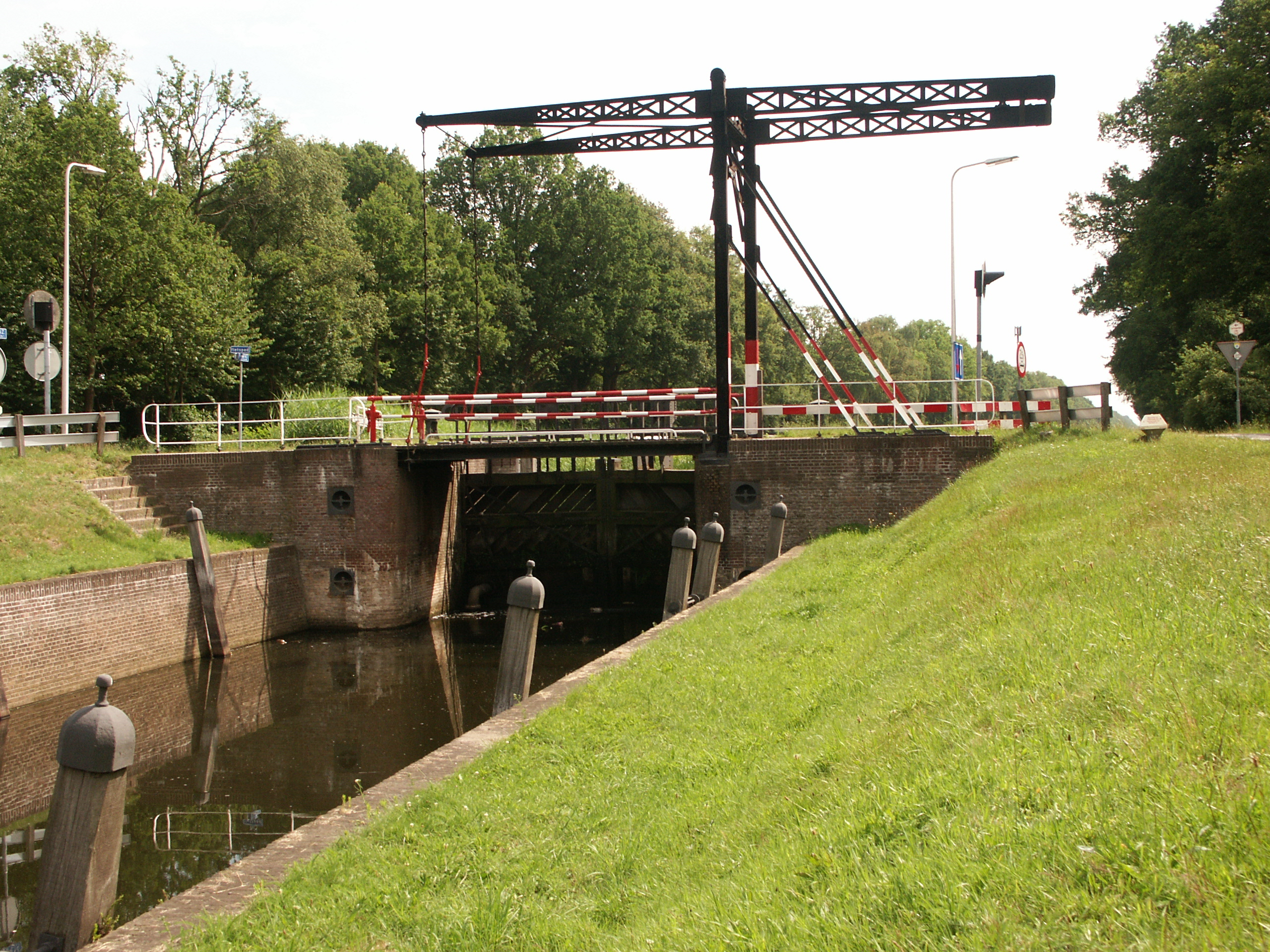
Sluice in the Kanaal Almelo-Nordhorn
