= Kai Aareleid =

Estonian writer

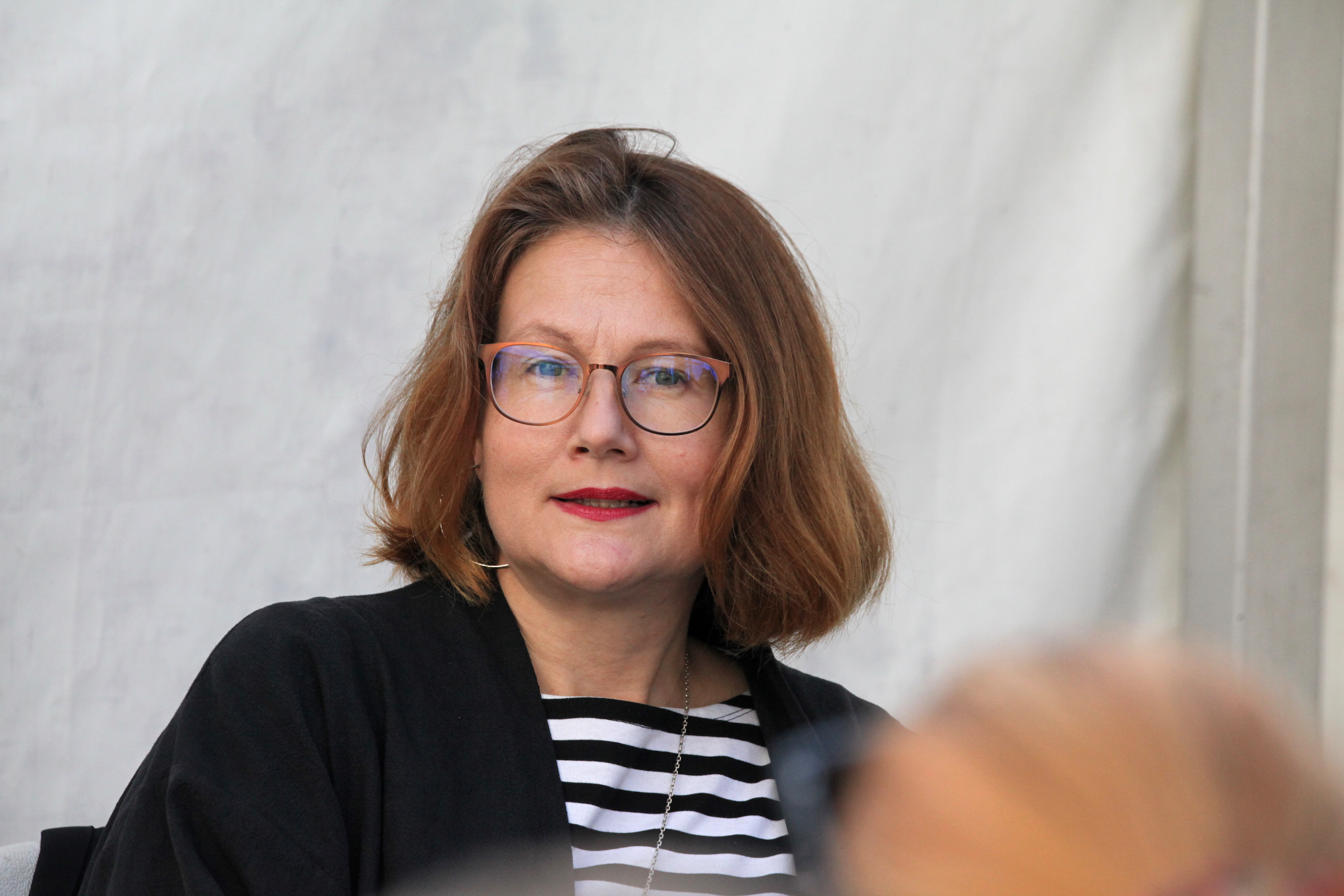
- Kai Aareleid at the annual Literary Street festival 2021 in Tallinn, Estonia
- Born: September 26, 1972 (age 53); Tartu
- Occupations: prose writer, poet and translator

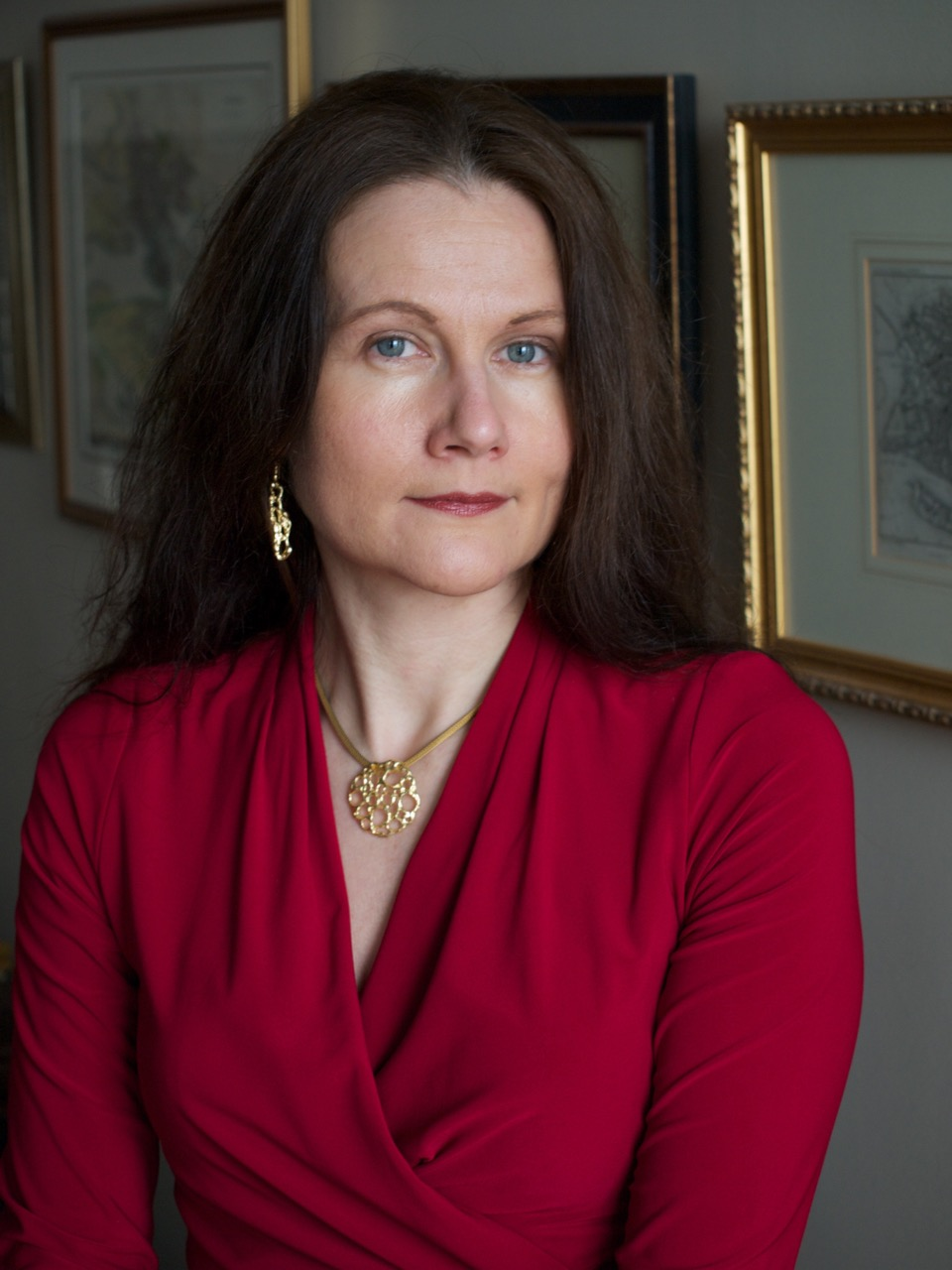
Kai Aareleid (2016)

Kai Aareleid (born 26 September 1972 in Tartu) is an Estonian prose writer, poet and translator.

From 1979 to 1990 she attended Tallinn 21st Secondary School.

Aareleid attended Theatre Academy Helsinki from 1991 to 1997, studying stagecraft, ultimately receiving a master's degree. From 1996 to 2006, she worked as an administrative assistant at the British Council office in Tallinn. From 2012 to 2017, she was an editor for the Loomingu Raamatukogu.

Aareleid is also a translator, she translated among other Jorge Luis Borges into Estonian.

== Awards ==
Tuglas Short Story Prize

== Works ==
- 2011: novel "Vene veri" ('Russian Blood')
- 2012: short story "Tango"
- 2015: poetry collection "Naised teel" ('Women on the Road')
- 2015: poetry collection "Vihm ja vein" ('Rain and Wine')
- 2016: novel "Linnade põletamine" ('The Burning of Cities')
