= Hillar Aarelaid =

Estonian computer scientist

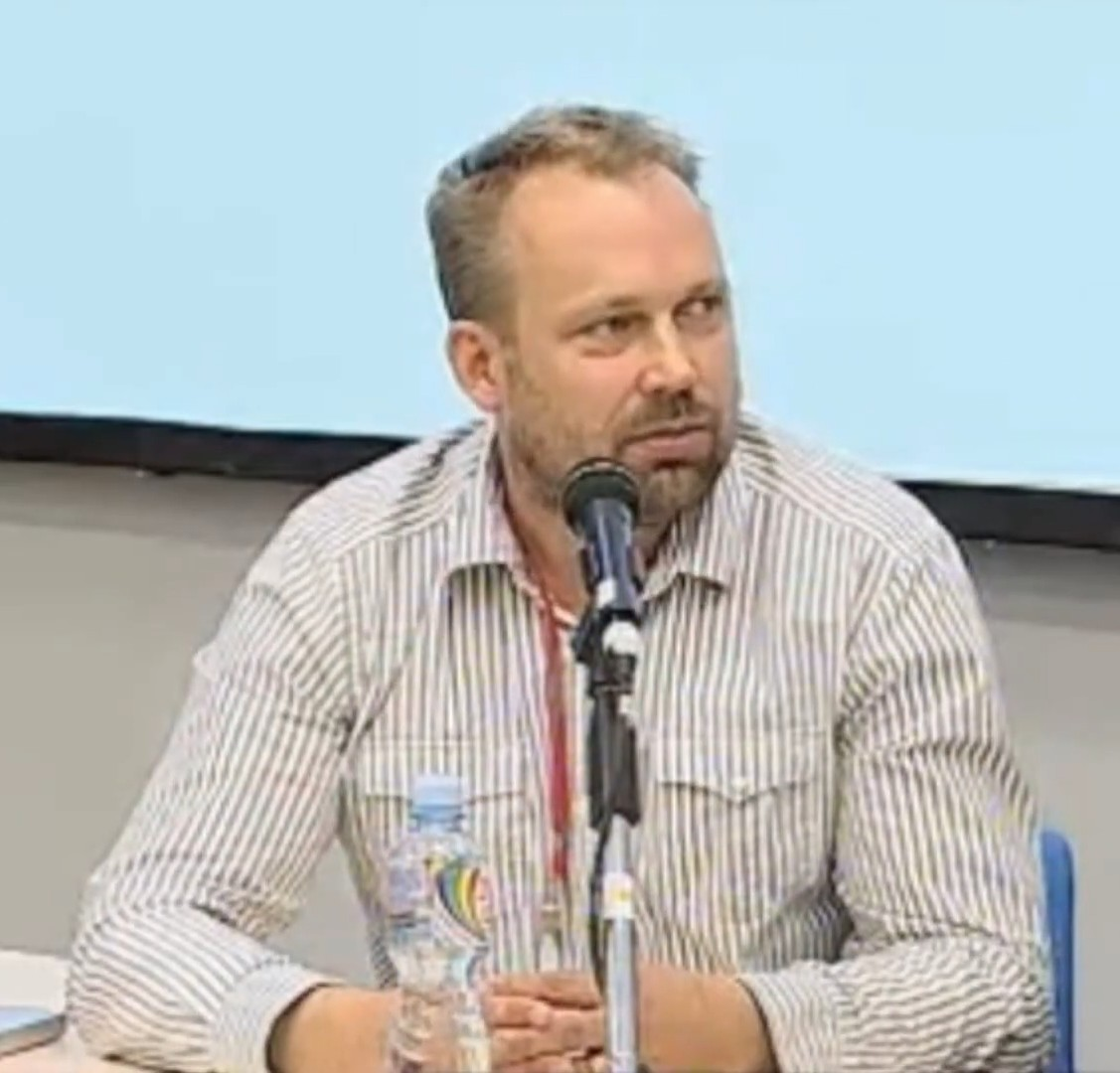
- Born: 31 December 1967 (age 58)
- Occupation: Cybersecurity expert
- Known for: Founder and first CEO of CERT-EE

Hillar Aarelaid (born 31 December 1967) is the founder and first CEO for Estonia's Computer Emergency Response Team (CERT-EE). He was the Director General of the Estonian Data Protection Inspectorate from 1999 to 2003.

Aarelaid was one of the central officials in charge of responding to the computer attacks on Estonia after the Bronze Soldier of Tallinn controversy. American expert Bill Woodcock and other observers praised Aarelaid's calm professionalism displayed during the attacks.
