= London Process =

The London Process is a series of multistakeholder meetings held biennially since 2011 under the name Global Conference on Cyberspace or GCCS. In each GCCS meeting, governments, the private sector and civil society gather to discuss and promote practical cooperation in cyberspace, to enhance cyber capacity building, and to discuss norms for responsible behavior in cyberspace. The London Process was proposed by British Foreign Secretary William Hague at the 2011 Munich Security Conference.

== History ==
=== First conference ===
The first GCCS conference was held in London on November 23–24, 2011, under the auspices of the British Foreign Office. The location of the first meeting inspired the name "London Process" for the series of meetings which followed. At this first meeting a set of principles “for governing behavior in cyberspace” were established through discussion amongst the 700 participants.

=== Second conference ===
The second GCCS conference was held on October 4-5th, 2012 in Budapest. The main subject and focus that has been discussed was the relationship between internet rights and internet security. Even though very few civil society organisations were invited to speak, the networking was valuable, and had more longer-term impact than the chair's statement which represents the outcome of the event.

=== Third conference ===
The third event held on 17–18 October 2013 in Seoul. The conference had grown to approximately 1,600 attendees with greater representation from countries in the global south. The principle outcome of the third GCCS was the Seoul Framework for and Commitment to Open and Secure Cyberspace, which highlights the importance of universal Internet access, emphasizes that the same rights that people have offline must also be protected online, and reinforces a UN principle that international law is applicable online and is essential to maintaining peace and stability and promoting an open, secure, peaceful and accessible ICT environment.

=== Fourth conference ===
The fourth GCCS conference was held at the World Forum from 16 to 17 April 2015 in The Hague, under the auspices of the Dutch Ministry of Foreign Affairs.

=== Fifth conference ===
The fifth GCCS conference held from 23 to 24 November 2017 in New Delhi, India, and had 3,500 participants. Theme of GCCS 2017 is “Cyber4All: A Secure and Inclusive Cyberspace for Sustainable Development”. However it could further be divided into following four sections: Cyber4Growth – share ideas and insights to foster growth and development with growing importance of the cyber space to individuals, small businesses, large companies etc. Cyber4DigitalInclusion –draw road map for inclusive . society by sharing best practices for digital identity, idea of open and free Internet for all, digital technologies for enabling disabled etc. Cyber4Security –framework for comprehensive cyber. security protocols for organisations and nations.

Cyber4Diplomacy –explore various facets of cyber security . such as interstate cooperation for preventing Cyber Warfare and Cyber Diplomacy for Global Order.
