= Federal Internet Exchange =

Former Internet peering points in the United States

Federal Internet Exchange (FIX) points were policy-based network peering points where U.S. federal agency networks, such as the National Science Foundation Network (NSFNET), NASA Science Network (NSN), Energy Sciences Network (ESnet), and MILNET were interconnected.

Two FIXes were established in June 1989 under the auspices of the Federal Engineering Planning Group (FEPG). FIX East, at the University of Maryland in College Park, and FIX West, at the NASA Ames Research Center in Mountain View, California. The existence of the FIXes allowed the ARPANET to be phased out in mid-1990. FIX West was eventually expanded to become MAE-West, one of the NSF-supported Network Access Points.

== See also ==
- Commercial Internet eXchange (CIX)
- Internet Exchange Point (IXP)
- Network Access Point (NAP)
- Timeline of the history of the Internet
