= Linotronic =

The Linotronic imagesetters are a type of high-quality printer, capable of printing at resolutions of up to 2540 dots per inch. The Linotronic allowed graphic artists to cheaply set type that exceeded the quality of many phototypesetting systems in use at the time. It allowed output by taking a PostScript file on a removable disk to a service bureau for output on the bureau's Linotronic.

Manufactured by Mergenthaler Linotype Company and popularized by the Adobe raster image processor (RIP), enabling PostScript language files to be imaged by the Linotronic imagesetter. Although it was the first commercial usage of PostScript, which began the emergence of graphics applications dominance by Adobe, the first popular use of PostScript was the Apple Laserwriter (succeeded a few months later by the LaserWriter Plus).

Adobe's RIPs have generally been named for United States rockets such as Atlas and Redstone but Apple's RIP was of its own design, and was implemented using few integrated circuits (ICs), including PALs for most combinatorial logic, with the subsystem timing, DRAM refreshing, and rasterization functions being implemented in very few medium-integration PALs. Apple's competitors such as QMS and NEC have generally used a variation of one of Adobe's RIPs with their large quantity of low-integration (i.e., Texas Instruments' 7400 series) ICs.
