= Packet Clearing House =

Organization maintaining the Domain Name System and Internet exchange points

Packet Clearing House (PCH)
- Founded: 1994; 32 years ago
- Founder: Chris Alan and Mark Kent
- Type: International organization
- Legal status: Active
- Location: San Francisco, California, United States
- Origins: National Information Infrastructure Plan
- Key people: Bill Woodcock (Secretary General); Steve Feldman (Chairman of the Board); Sylvie LaPerriere (Non-Executive Director); Mark Tinka (Non-Executive Director); Greg Akers (Non-Executive Director); Andrea Cima (Chief Operations Officer); Bob Arasmith (Systems Director); Kabindra Shrestha (Network Director); Allison Mankin DNS Services Director); Moez Chakchouk (Government Affairs)
- Revenue: USD 1,324,139 (2018)"Packet Clearing House Inc — Nonprofit Explorer (Form 990 extracted financial data)". ProPublica. USD 2,013,249 (2017) USD 2,221,427 (2016) USD 1,608,461 (2015) USD 1,479,049 (2014)
- Employees: 28
- Volunteers: 50
- Website: pch.net
- ASN: 3856

Packet Clearing House (PCH) is the international organization responsible for providing operational support and security to critical Internet infrastructure, including Internet exchange points and the core of the Domain Name System. The organization also works in the areas of cybersecurity coordination, regulatory policy and Internet governance.

== Overview ==
Packet Clearing House (PCH) was formed in 1994 by Chris Alan and Mark Kent to provide efficient regional and local network interconnection alternatives for the West Coast of the United States. It has grown to become a leading proponent of neutral independent network interconnection and provider of route-servers at major exchange points worldwide.

PCH provides equipment, training, data, and operational support to organizations and individual researchers seeking to improve the quality, robustness, and Internet accessibility.

Major PCH projects include:

- Building and supporting nearly half of the world's approximately 700 Internet exchange points (IXPs), and maintaining the canonical index of Internet exchange points, with data going back to 1994;
- Operating the world's largest anycast Domain Name System (DNS) server platform, including two root nameservers, more than 400 top-level domains (TLDs) including the country-code domains of more than 130 countries, and the Quad9 recursive resolver;
- Operating the only FIPS 140-2 Level 4 global TLD DNSSEC key management and signing infrastructure, with facilities in Singapore, Zurich, and San Jose,
- Implementing network research data collection initiatives in more than 130 countries;
- Publishing original research and policy guidance in the areas of telecommunications regulation, including the 2011, 2016 and 2021 Interconnection Surveys, country reports such as those for Canada in 2012 and 2016 and Paraguay in 2012, and a survey of critical infrastructure experts for the GCSC; and
- Developing and presenting educational materials to foster a better understanding of Internet architectural principles and their policy implications among policymakers, technologists, and the general public.

For example, in May 2023, Rwandan President Paul Kagame received Bill Woodcock, executive director of PCH, in Kigali to discuss cooperation on internet infrastructure development and internet exchange operations.

Notable past projects include the INOC-DBA critical infrastructure protection hotline communications system, now operated by the Brazilian CERT.

PCH works closely with the United States Telecommunications Training Institute (USTTI) to offer courses on telecommunications regulation, Internet infrastructure construction and management, Domain Name System management, and Internet security coordination, three times a year in Washington, D.C. It also teaches in 80 to 100 on-location workshops a year throughout the world.

As of 2023, DNS servers operated by PCH employ routers from multiple vendors for redundancy through diversity, and for the same purpose use CentOS and Debian simultaneously as well as nsd, bind9 and dnsdist DNS server software.

== Funding ==
PCH has more than 500 institutional donors, including the Soros Open Society Institute, which funded PCH in developing open source tools which help Internet service providers (ISPs) optimize their traffic routing, reduce costs and increase performance of Internet service delivered to the public; the United Nations Development Programme; Cisco Systems; NTT/Verio; Lumen; Equinix; the governments of Sweden, Denmark, Canada, Mexico, France, Singapore, Chile, Switzerland, and the United States; and hundreds of Internet service providers and individuals.

== Locations ==
As of July 2025, PCH maintains staffed offices in Paris, San Francisco, Amsterdam, Kathmandu, Budapest, Johannesburg, Abu Dhabi, Washington and Portland. It operates critical network infrastructure within 333 Internet exchange points.

== Personnel ==
As of 2026, the PCH board of directors consists of Steve Feldman (chairman), Bill Woodcock (secretary general), Sylvie LaPerriere, Gregory Akers, and Mark Tinka. PCH lists Eddy Kayihura as Director of Government Affairs.

== See also ==
- Quad9
