= Internet exchange point =

Internet infrastructure through which ISPs exchange traffic

Internet exchange points (IXes or IXPs) are common grounds of IP networking, allowing participant Internet service providers (ISPs) to exchange data destined for their respective networks. IXPs are generally located at places with preexisting connections to multiple distinct networks, i.e., datacenters, and operate physical infrastructure (switches) to connect their participants. Organizationally, most IXPs are each independent not-for-profit associations of their constituent participating networks (that is, the set of ISPs that participate in that IXP). The primary alternative to IXPs is private peering, where ISPs and large customers directly connect their networks.

IXPs reduce the portion of an ISP's traffic that must be delivered via their upstream transit providers, thereby reducing the average per-bit delivery cost of their service. Furthermore, the increased number of paths available through the IXP improves routing efficiency (by allowing routers to select shorter paths) and fault-tolerance. IXPs exhibit the characteristics of the network effect. They can be located in colocation centers.

== History ==
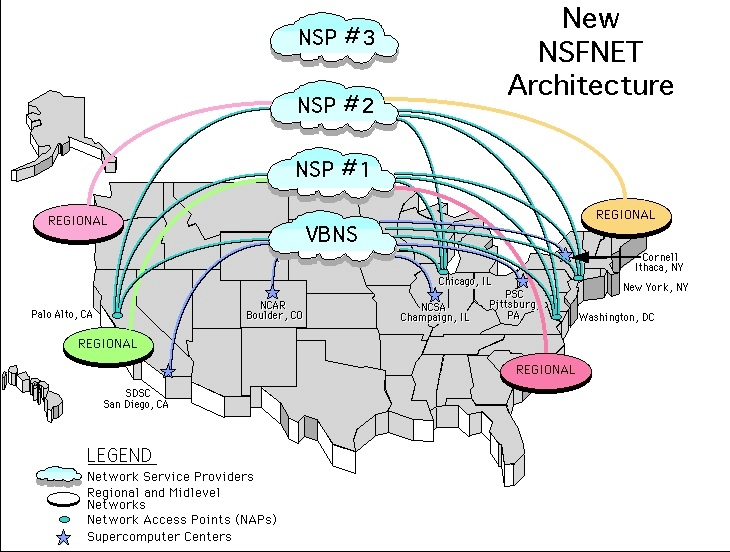
NSFNet Internet architecture, c. 1995

Internet exchange points began as Network Access Points or NAPs, a key component of Al Gore's National Information Infrastructure (NII) plan, which defined the transition from the US Government-paid-for NSFNET era (when Internet access was government sponsored and commercial traffic was prohibited) to the commercial Internet of today. The four Network Access Points (NAPs) were defined as transitional data communications facilities at which Network Service Providers (NSPs) would exchange traffic, in replacement of the publicly financed NSFNET Internet backbone. The National Science Foundation let contracts supporting the four NAPs, one to MFS Datanet for the preexisting MAE-East in Washington, D.C., and three others to Sprint, Ameritech, and Pacific Bell, for new facilities of various designs and technologies, in New York (actually Pennsauken, New Jersey), Chicago, and California, respectively. As a transitional strategy, they were effective, providing a bridge from the Internet's beginnings as a government-funded academic experiment, to the modern Internet of many private-sector competitors collaborating to form a network-of-networks, transporting Internet bandwidth from its points-of-production at Internet exchange points to its sites-of-consumption at users' locations.

This transition was particularly timely, coming hard on the heels of the ANS CO+RE controversy, which had disturbed the nascent industry, led to congressional hearings, resulted in a law allowing NSF to promote and use networks that carry commercial traffic, prompted a review of the administration of NSFNET by the NSF's Inspector General (no serious problems were found), and caused commercial operators to realize that they needed to be able to communicate with each other independent of third parties or at neutral exchange points.

Although the three telco-operated NAPs faded into obscurity relatively quickly after the expiration of the federal subsidies, MAE-East, thrived for fifteen more years, and its west-coast counterpart MAE-West continued for more than twenty years.

Today, the phrase "Network Access Point" is of historical interest only, since the four transitional NAPs disappeared long ago, replaced by hundreds of modern Internet exchange points, though in Spanish-speaking Latin America, the phrase lives on to a small degree, among those who conflate the NAPs with IXPs.

== Function ==
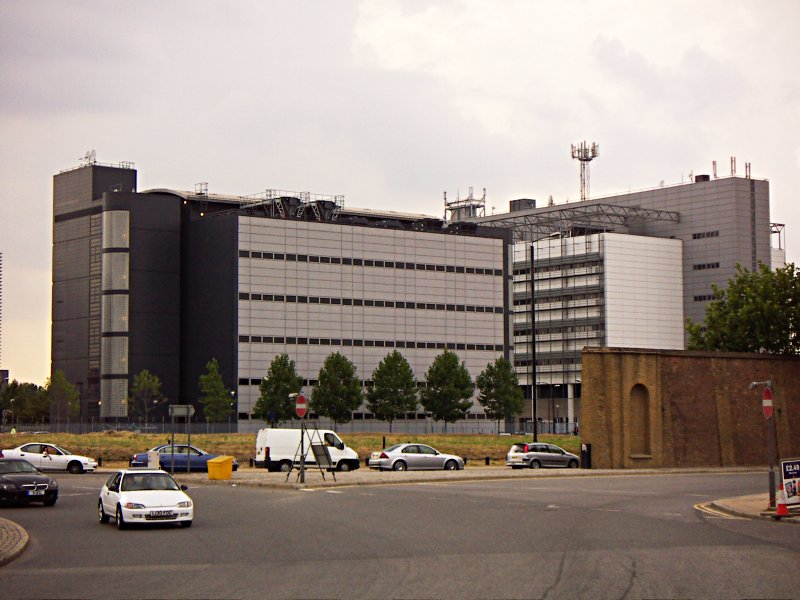
Initial location of the London Internet Exchange (LINX): Telehouse Docklands

The primary purpose of an IXP is to enable networks to interconnect directly, via the exchange, rather than going through one or more third-party networks. The primary advantages of direct interconnection are cost, latency, and bandwidth.

Traffic passing through an exchange is typically not billed by any party, whereas traffic to an ISP's upstream provider is. The direct interconnection, often located in the same city as both networks, avoids the need for data to travel to other cities—and potentially on other continents—to get from one network to another, thus reducing latency.

The third advantage, speed, is most noticeable in areas that have poorly developed long-distance connections. ISPs in regions with poor connections might have to pay between 10 or 100 times more for data transport than ISPs in North America, Europe, or Japan. Therefore, these ISPs typically have slower, more limited connections to the rest of the Internet. However, a connection to a local IXP may allow them to transfer data without limit, and without cost, vastly improving the bandwidth between customers of such adjacent ISPs.

Internet Exchange Points (IXPs) are public locations where several networks are connected to each other. Public peering is done at IXPs, while private peering can be done with direct links between networks.

== Operations ==
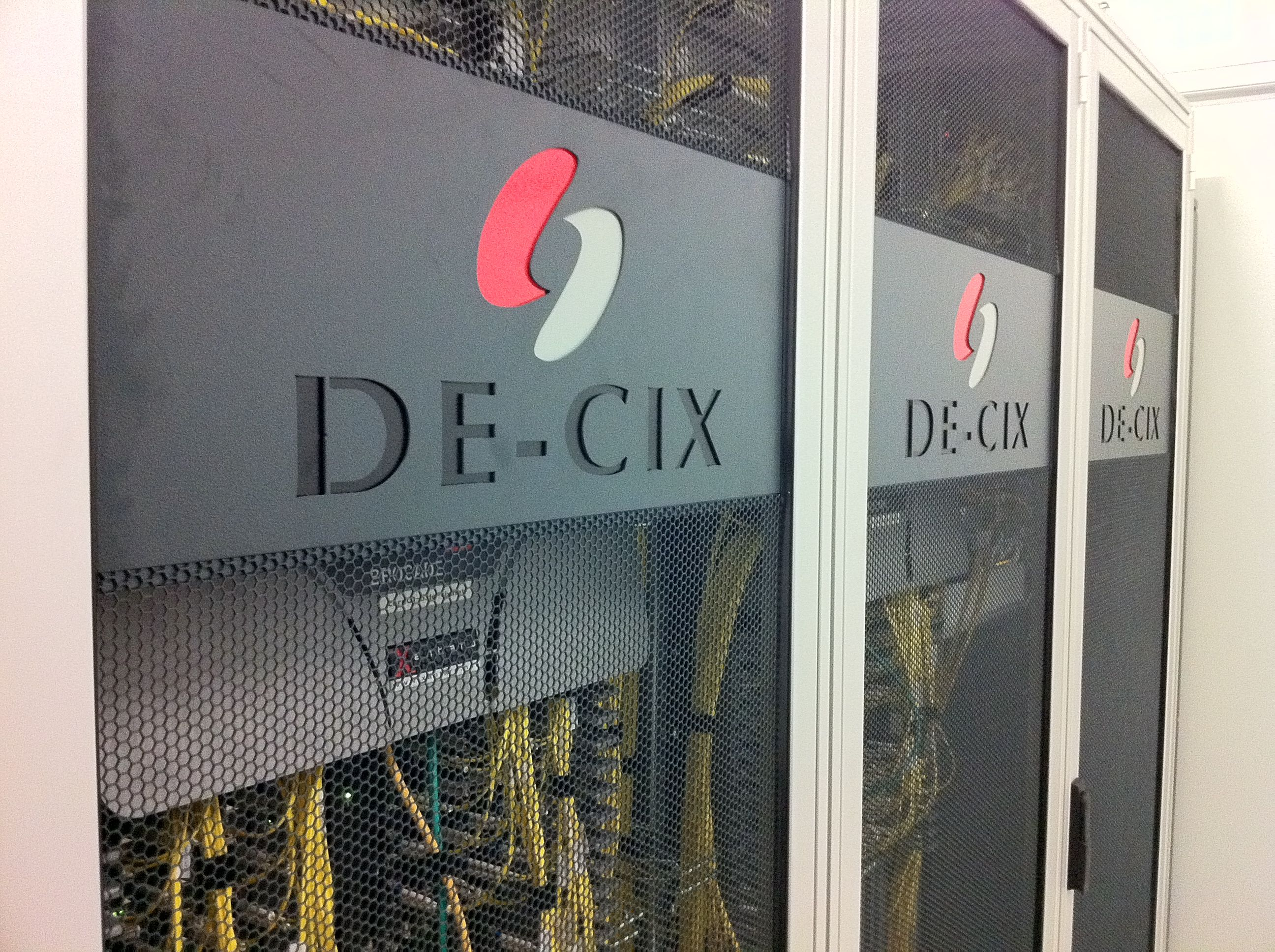
A 19-inch rack used for switches at the DE-CIX in Frankfurt, Germany

=== Technical operations ===
A typical IXP consists of one or more network switches, to which each of the participating ISPs connect. Prior to the existence of switches, IXPs typically employed fiber-optic inter-repeater link (FOIRL) hubs or Fiber Distributed Data Interface (FDDI) rings, migrating to Ethernet and FDDI switches as those became available in 1993 and 1994.

Asynchronous Transfer Mode (ATM) switches were briefly used at a few IXPs in the late 1990s, accounting for approximately 4% of the market at their peak, and there was an attempt by Stockholm-based IXP NetNod to use SRP/DPT, but Ethernet has prevailed, accounting for more than 95% of all existing Internet exchange switch fabrics. All Ethernet port speeds are to be found at modern IXPs, ranging from 10 Mb/second ports in use in small developing-country IXPs, to ganged 10 Gb/second ports in major centers like Seoul, New York, London, Frankfurt, Amsterdam, and Palo Alto. Ports with 100 Gb/second are available, for example, at the AMS-IX in Amsterdam and at the DE-CIX in Frankfurt.

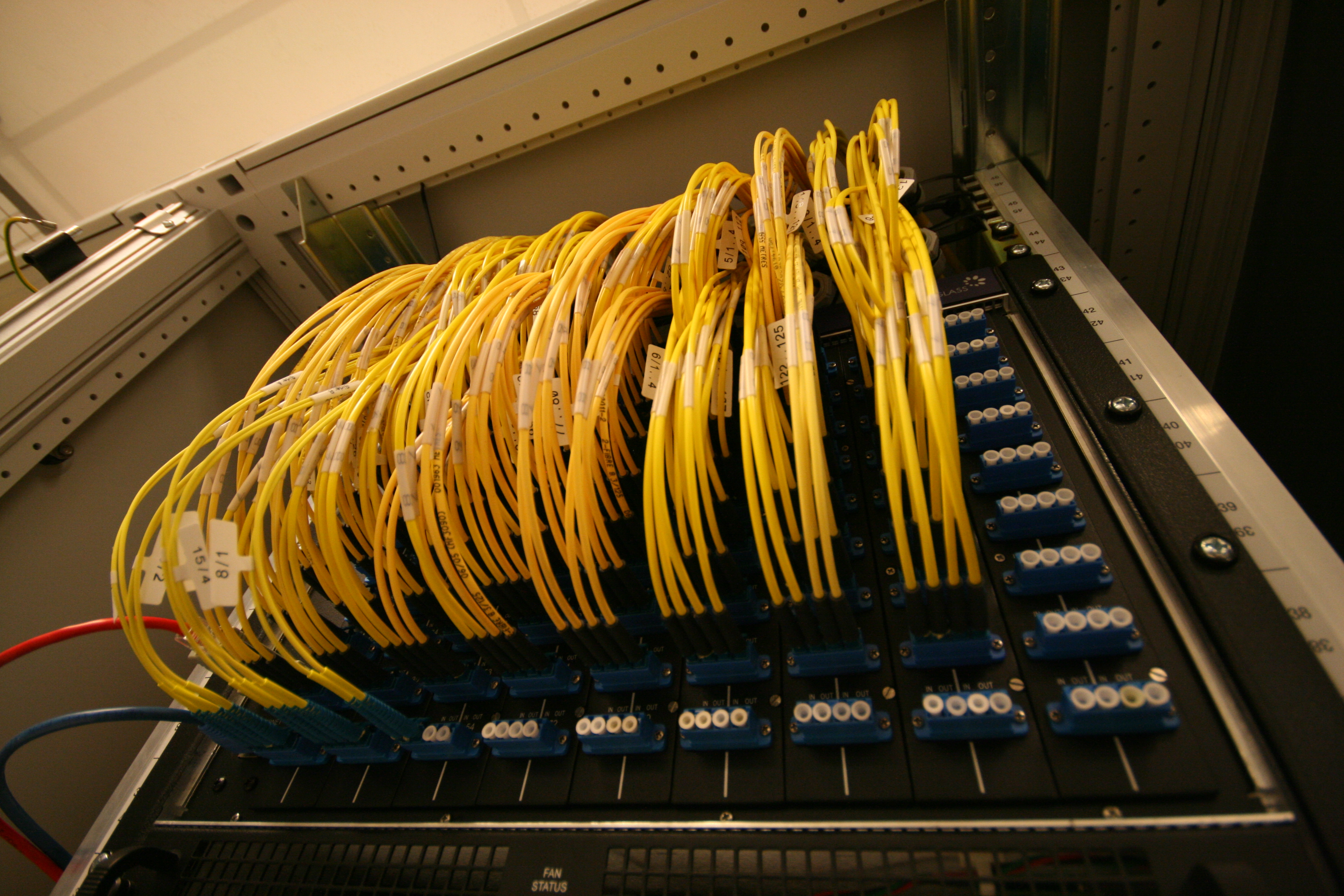
An optical fiber patch panel at the Amsterdam Internet Exchange

=== Business operations ===
The principal business and governance models for IXPs include:

- Not-for-profit association (usually of the participating ISPs)
- Operator-neutral for-profit company (usually the operator of a datacenter hosting the IXP)
- University
- Government agency (often the communications ministry or regulator, at national scale, or municipal government, at local scale)
- Unincorporated informal association of networks (defined by an open-ended multi-party contract, without independent legal existence)

The technical and business logistics of traffic exchange between ISPs is governed by bilateral or multilateral peering agreements. Under such agreements, traffic is exchanged without compensation. When an IXP incurs operating costs, they are typically shared among all of its participants.

At the more expensive exchanges, participants pay a monthly or annual fee, usually determined by the speed of the port or ports which they are using. Fees based on the volume of traffic are less common because they provide a counterincentive to the growth of the exchange. Some exchanges charge a setup fee to offset the costs of the switch port and any media adaptors (gigabit interface converters, Small Form-factor Pluggable transceivers, XFP transceivers, XENPAKs, etc.) that the new participant requires.

== Traffic exchange ==
Diagram of the Layer 1 (physical) and Layer 2 (Data Link) topology of an Internet exchange point (IXP)

Diagram of the Layer 3 (network) topology of an Internet exchange point (IXP)

Internet traffic exchange between two participants on an IXP is facilitated by Border Gateway Protocol (BGP) routing configurations between them. They choose to announce routes via the peering relationship – either routes to their own addresses or routes to addresses of other ISPs that they connect to, possibly via other mechanisms. The other party to the peering can then apply route filtering, where it chooses to accept those routes, and route traffic accordingly, or to ignore those routes, and use other routes to reach those addresses.

In many cases, an ISP will have both a direct link to another ISP and accept a route (normally ignored) to the other ISP through the IXP; if the direct link fails, traffic will then start flowing over the IXP. In this way, the IXP acts as a backup link.

When these conditions are met, and a contractual structure exists to create a market to purchase network services, the IXP is sometimes called a "transit exchange". The Vancouver Transit Exchange, for example, is described as a "shopping mall" of service providers at one central location, making it easy to switch providers, "as simple as getting a VLAN to a new provider". The VTE is run by BCNET, a public entity.

Advocates of green broadband schemes and more competitive telecommunications services often advocate aggressive expansion of transit exchanges into every municipal area network so that competing service providers can place such equipment as video on demand hosts and PSTN switches to serve existing phone equipment, without being answerable to any monopoly incumbent.

Since the dissolution of the Internet backbone and transition to the IXP system in 1992, the measurement of Internet traffic exchanged at IXPs has been the primary source of data about Internet bandwidth production: how it grows over time and where it is produced. Standardized measures of bandwidth production have been in place since 1996 and have been refined over time.

== See also ==
- Historical IXPs
  - MAE-East and MAE-West
  - Commercial Internet eXchange (CIX)
  - Federal Internet Exchange (FIX)
- Associations of Internet exchange point operators:
  - Euro-IX, the European Internet Exchange Association
  - APIX, the Asia Pacific Internet Exchange Association
  - LAC-IX, the Latin America & Caribbean Internet Exchange Association
  - Af-IX, the African IXP Association
- Route server
- Internet service provider
- Data center
- Packet Clearing House
- List of Internet exchange points
- Meet-me room
- Peering
