= Eduroam =

International Wi-Fi authentication service

eduroam
- Logo
- Formation: 2002 (24 years ago)
- Purpose: International authentication infrastructure
- Region served: Worldwide
- Website: eduroam.org

eduroam (a portmanteau of education and roaming) is an international Wi-Fi internet access roaming service for users in research, higher education and further education. It provides researchers, teachers, and students network access when visiting an institution other than their own. Users are authenticated with credentials from their home institution, regardless of the location of the eduroam access point. Authorization to access the Internet and other resources are handled by the visited institution. Users do not have to pay to use eduroam.

In some countries, Internet access via eduroam is also available at other locations than the participating institutions, e.g. in libraries, public buildings, railway stations, city centres and airports.

== History ==
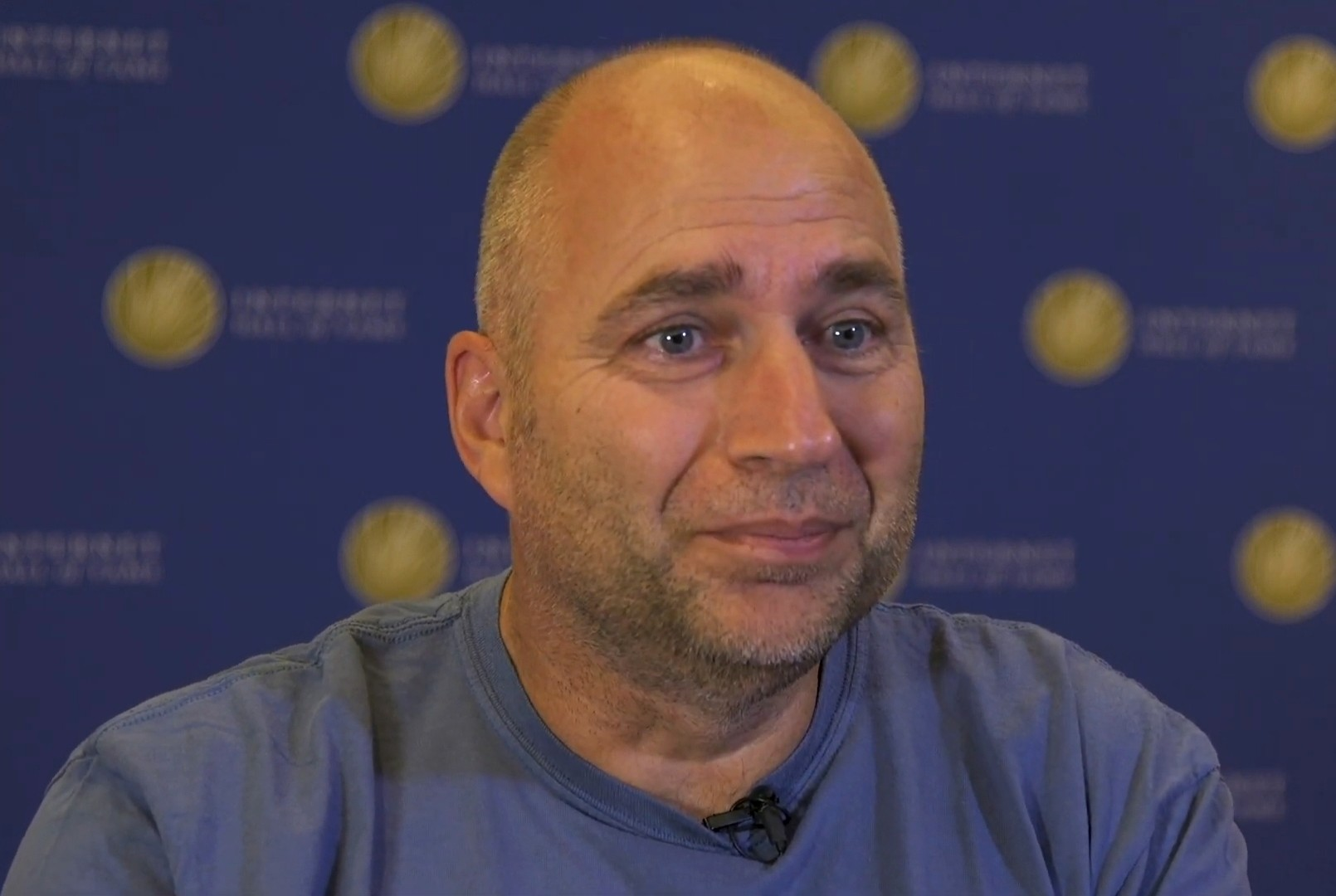
Klaas Wierenga, 2019

The eduroam initiative started in 2002 when during the preparations for the creation of TERENA's task force TF-Mobility, Klaas Wierenga of SURFnet shared the idea of combining a RADIUS-based infrastructure with IEEE 802.1X technology to provide roaming network access across research and education networks. Initially, the service was joined by institutions in the Netherlands, Germany, Finland, Portugal, Croatia and the United Kingdom. Later, other NRENs in Europe embraced the idea and started joining the infrastructure, which was then called eduroam. Since 2004, the European Union co-funded further research and development work related to the eduroam service through the GÉANT GN2, GN3, GN4, and GN5 projects. From September 2007, the European Union also funded through these projects the continued operation and maintenance of the eduroam service at the European level.

The first non-European country to join eduroam was Australia, in December 2004. In Canada, eduroam started as an initiative of the University of British Columbia, which was later taken over by CANARIE as a service of its Canadian Access Federation. In the United States, eduroam was initially a pilot project between the National Science Foundation and the University of Tennessee (UTK). In 2012, Internet2 announced the addition of eduroam to its NET+ service offerings. AnyRoam LLC, a private company, was formed by former UTK staff to serve as an Internet2 active corporate member administering the US top-level servers. In 2021, Internet2 assumed direct management of the eduroam service for US-based organizations.

== Technology ==
The eduroam service uses IEEE 802.1X as the authentication method and a hierarchical system of RADIUS servers. The hierarchy typically consists of RADIUS servers at the participating institutions, national RADIUS servers run by the National Roaming Operators, and regional top-level RADIUS servers for individual world regions. In some cases, institutions contact each other directly via DNS lookups.

When a user visits a remote institution, the user's device presents their credentials to the local RADIUS server. That RADIUS server discovers that it is not responsible for the realm of the user's home institution and proxies the access request to another RADIUS server, typically the national RADIUS server. If the visited institution is in a different country than the home institution, the request is in turn proxied to the regional top-level RADIUS server, and then to the national RADIUS server of the user's home country. That national server forwards the credentials to the home institution, where they are verified. The RADIUS response travels back over the proxy-hierarchy to the visited institution and the user is granted access.

In eduroam, the user credentials are always presented in the form of an EAP method. The EAP method is responsible for ensuring that the users credentials are secure, and private. The users credentials can then travel via a number of intermediate servers, not under the control of the home institution of the user. This requirement limits the types of EAP methods that can be used. EAP methods which do not provide for security or privacy of user credentials cannot be used in eduroam.

The most commonly used EAP methods in eduroam are EAP-TLS, PEAP, and EAP-TTLS. The methods used generally fall into two broad categories: those that use credentials in the form of some public-key mechanism with certificates and those that use so-called tunnelled authentication with "inner" passwords or other credentials. Most institutions use a tunnelled authentication method that requires a server certificate. These server certificates are used to set up a secure tunnel between the mobile device and the authentication server, through which the user credentials (e.g. name and password) are securely transported.

A complication arises if the user's home institution does not use a two-letter country-code top-level domain as part of its realm, but a generic top-level domain such as .edu or .org. By inspection of such realms, it is not possible to determine which national RADIUS server the request should be routed to. Such domains will thus, by default, fail to work in international roaming. The workaround for this problem involves the creation of exceptions in the international RADIUS request routing tables; however, this workaround does not scale as the number of exception entries grows. Several solutions have been proposed to eliminate this workaround in the future, the most promising of which is RADIUS over TLS with Dynamic Discovery, which does not rely on static routing tables inside a RADIUS server configuration to route requests to their proper destination. Instead, the participating institution adds one NAPTR DNS resource record to its own domain's DNS zone, which states by which server eduroam authentication for the domain is handled.

== Governance ==
GÉANT has established a global governance structure. Due to variations in the organization and funding of research and education networking across countries and regions, rules imposed on the operations of eduroam are limited to technical and administrative requirements for the operation of eduroam worldwide. eduroam operators establish and maintain the rules of the global eduroam governance.

The Global eduroam Governance Committee (GeGC) has the central role in the global eduroam governance structure. While its structure has evolved over time, it presently has three representatives from each of five regions — mirroring those used by the Regional Internet registries — serving a two-year term. In addition, GÉANT may appoint one or more experts as non-voting members of the GeGC.

== Geographical deployment ==
eduroam is available at over 40,000 locations in over 100 countries with a National Roaming Operator that has signed the eduroam Compliance Statement. In addition, there may be pilot deployments in countries that are in the process of joining eduroam.

=== Middle East ===
eduroam is deployed in:

- Iran (IRANET)
- Israel (IUCC)
- Oman (OMREN)
- Saudi Arabia (MAEEN)
- United Arab Emirates (Ankabut)
- Lebanon

=== Europe ===
The NRENs that are members of the consortium of the GN3 project have joined the European eduroam confederation by signing the confederation's policy that requires its members to comply with a set of technical and organisational requirements, which are more specific than those in the global eduroam Compliance Statement.

As a consequence, eduroam is deployed in the following countries:

- Austria (ACOnet)
- Belgium (Belnet)
- Bosnia and Herzegovina (University of Sarajevo)
- Bulgaria (BREN)
- Croatia (CARNET)
- Cyprus (CYNET)
- Czech Republic (CESNET)
- Denmark (NORDUnet, operated by DeIC)
- Estonia (EENet)
- Finland (NORDUnet, operated by FUNET)
- France (RENATER)
- Germany (DFN)
- Greece (GRNET)
- Hungary (NIIF)
- Iceland (NORDUnet, operated by RHnet)
- Ireland (HEAnet)
- Israel (IUCC)
- Italy (GARR)
- Latvia (SigmaNet)
- Lithuania (LITNET)
- Luxembourg (RESTENA)
- North Macedonia (MARNET)
- Malta (University of Malta)
- Montenegro (MREN)
- Netherlands (SURFnet)
- Norway (NORDUnet, operated by UNINETT)
- Poland (PSNC)
- Portugal (FCCN)
- Romania (RoEduNet)
- Serbia (AMRES)
- Slovakia (SANET)
- Slovenia (ARNES)
- Spain (RedIRIS)
- Sweden (NORDUnet, operated by SUNET)
- Switzerland (SWITCH)
- Turkey (ULAKBIM)
- United Kingdom (Janet)

In addition, three NRENs that are associate members of the consortium of the GN3 project without voting rights joined the European eduroam confederation; they represent Belarus (UIIP), Moldova (RENAM) and Russia (Joint Supercomputer Center of the Russian Academy of Sciences).

Finally, five NRENs not involved in the GN3 project joined the European eduroam confederation on a voluntary basis, enabling the deployment of the service in:

- Andorra (Universitat d'Andorra)
- Armenia (ASNET-AM)
- Azerbaijan (AzScienceNet)
- Kazakhstan (KazRENA)
- Kyrgyzstan (KRENA)

The European top-level RADIUS servers are operated by SURFnet and Forskningsnettet.

=== Asia-Pacific ===
eduroam is deployed in the following countries and economies:

- Australia (AARNet)
- Cambodia (Institute of Technology of Cambodia)
- China (CSTNET and CERNET)
- Fiji (Fiji National University)
- Hong Kong (Harnet)
- India (ERNET)
- Indonesia (UII, UGM, USU)
- Japan (NII)
- Macau (University of Macau)
- Malaysia (MYREN)
- New Zealand (REANNZ)
- Philippines (University of the Philippines Diliman)
- Pakistan (Higher Education Commission)
- Singapore (SingAREN)
- South Korea (KREONET)
- Sri Lanka (Lanka Education and Research Network, University of Kelaniya, University of Moratuwa)
- Taiwan (Ministry of Education)
- Thailand (UniNet)
- Bangladesh

The Asia-Pacific top-level RADIUS servers are operated by AARNet and by the University of Hong Kong.

=== North America ===
eduroam is deployed in:

- Canada (CANARIE)
- United States (Internet2)
- Mexico
- Costa Rica
- Trinidad and Tobago (UWI)

=== Latin America ===
eduroam is deployed in:

- Argentina (INNOVARED)
- Brazil (RNP)
- Chile (REUNA)
- Colombia (RENATA)
- Ecuador (CEDIA)
- Mexico (CUDI)
- Peru (RAAP)

=== Africa ===
eduroam is deployed in:

- Algeria (ARN)
- Burkina Faso (FASOREN)
- Cote d'Ivoire (Riter)
- Ethiopia (EthERNet)
- Ghana (GARNET)
- Kenya (KENET)
- Madagascar (i RENALA)
- Malawi (MAREN)
- Mauretania (Rimer)
- Morocco (MARWAN)
- Mozambique (MoRENet)
- Namibia (via TENET)
- Nigeria (NgREN/Eko-Konnect)
- Somalia (SomaliREN)
- South Africa (TENET)
- Tanzania (TERNET)
- Togo (TogoRER)
- Uganda (RENU)
- Zambia (ZAMREN)

The inter-African RADIUS servers are operated by West-African research and education network WACREN, the UbuntuNet Alliance and TENET. In Uganda the Research Education Network for Uganda, RENU is a National Roaming Operator serving Universities , Tertiary Institutions and local secondary school with internet connectivity, cloud solutions and research collaboration.
