= NRENum.net =

End-user ENUM service

- Purpose: ENUM service for academia
- Parent organization: TERENA
- Website: www.nrenum.net

The NRENum.net service is an end-user ENUM service run by TERENA and the participating national research and education networking organisations (NRENs), primarily for academia. NRENum.net is considered as a complementary service and a valid alternative to the Golden ENUM tree. The domain nrenum.net is being populated in order to provide the infrastructure in DNS for storage of E.164 numbers. The NRENum.net service includes the operation of the Tier-0 root Domain Name Server(s) and the delegation of county codes to NRENum.net Registries. NRENum.net is a registered community trademark of TERENA.

== Service description ==
E.164 Telephone Number Mapping (ENUM) is a standard protocol that is the result of work of the Internet Engineering Task Force's Telephone Number Mapping working group. ENUM translates a telephone number into a domain name. This allows users to continue to use the existing phone number formats they are familiar with, while allowing the call to be routed using DNS. This makes ENUM a quick, stable and cheap link between telecommunications systems and the Internet.

RFC 3761 discusses the use of the Domain Name System for storage of E.164 numbers. More specifically, how DNS can be used for identifying available services connected to one E.164 number. The RIPE NCC provides DNS operations for e164.arpa (known as Golden ENUM tree) in accordance with the instructions from the Internet Architecture Board.

The NRENum.net service is an end-user ENUM service run by TERENA and the participating NRENs primarily for academia. NRENum.net is considered as a complementary service and a valid alternative to the Golden ENUM tree. The domain nrenum.net is being populated in order to provide the infrastructure in DNS for storage of E.164 numbers. The NRENum.net service includes the operation of the Tier-0 root Domain Name Servers and the delegation of county codes to NRENum.net Registries. NRENum.net is a registered community trademark of TERENA. NRENum.net facilitates services such as Voice over IP and videoconferencing.

NRENum.net tree refers to the tree structure where:

- Tier-0 root Domain Name Servers (technically one master and several secondary servers ensuring resilience) are run by the hosting organisations and coordinated by the NRENum.net Operations Team.
- Tier-1 Domain Name Servers are run by the NRENum.net (national or regional) Registries responsible for the country code(s) delegated.
- Tier-2 and lower DNS sub-delegations may be implemented, regulated by the national service policies.

An NRENum.net Registry is an entity that is authorised by the NRENum.net Operations Team to operate the national or regional Tier-1 Domain Name Server and be responsible for the county code(s) delegated. In many countries there is a National Research and Education Networking organisation (NREN) that acts as the Registry of the country.

An NRENum.net Registrar is responsible for the number/block registration in the Tier-1 DNS and a Number Validation Entity is responsible for the validation of the E.164 telephone numbers to be registered. The NREN may at the same time have the role of the NRENum.net Registry, Registrar and Validation Entity for the country code(s) delegated.

A Registrant (end user) is an E.164 telephone number holder. Holders of E.164 numbers who want to be listed in the service must contact the appropriate NRENum.net Registrar.

Number (block) delegation is the technical process of assigning country codes to national registries, or number blocks under country codes to end users. Number (block) registration is the technical process of configuring DNS and populating it with the appropriate ENUM records (i.e., adding NAPTR records to DNS) via registrars.

The ITU-T strictly regulates the number structure of valid E.164 telephone numbers and assigns number blocks to national authorities (telecom regulators) or recently to global entities directly. The national authorities can further delegate the number ranges to local operators within the country or region. A virtual number has either a non-valid E.164 number structure (e.g., longer than 15 digits) or has a valid structure but is not assigned to any national authorities or operators. The number Validation Entity is responsible for checking the numbers to be registered to NRENum.net.

== History ==
The idea for the NRENum.net service was conceived in 2006. NRENum.net became operational in August 2006, and was run by Bernie Höneisen, a staff member of SWITCH, and Kewin Stöckigt, a staff member of AARNet, as a private service, with technical support from SWITCH and the participants in the TERENA Task Force on Enhanced Communication Services (TF-ECS). When that task force completed its activities in 2008, TERENA agreed to take over the coordination of the NRENum.net service. By that time, nine NRENs had joined NRENum.net. The service continued to grow during the next years, and in March 2012 NRENum.net went global when RNP from Brazil joined the service as its 14th partificpant and the first outside Europe.

In 2011, the participants decided to migrate the operation of the service's master Domain Name Server to NIIF and the operation of the two secondary DNSs to CARNET and SWITCH. In 2013, Internet2, AARNet and NORDUnet set up additional secondary Domain Name Servers for their regions, thereby completing the global distribution of DNS slaves and bringing the resilience of the NRENum.net infrastructure to a high level.

== Governance ==
TERENA has established a lightweight global governance structure. The Global NRENum.net Governance Committee (GNGC) is the highest-level strategic body responsible for overall NRENum.net service definition, sustainability and long-term strategy. This includes formulating and recommending service governance principles and policies. Its members are nominated by the NRENum.net Registries in the various world regions, and are appointed by TERENA. The GNGC is composed of two members representing Europe, two representing the Asia-Pacific region, and two representing the Americas.

The NRENum.net Operations Team is responsible for the day-to-day operations of the Tier-0 root DNSs and the handling of country code delegation requests. It may escalate technical or policy issues to the GNGC for discussion.

TERENA is responsible for ensuring the correct and secure operations of the NRENum.net service performed by the NRENum.net Operations Team and governance by the GNGC. TERENA also supports the development of technical improvements to the NRENum.net service and promotes the deployment of NRENum.net worldwide.

== Geographical deployment ==
Thirty-two county codes are delegated in the NRENum.net service. Below these are listed per world region.

=== Europe ===
- +30 Greece (GRNET)
- +31 Netherlands (SURFnet)
- +32 Belgium (Belnet)
- +33 France (RENATER)
- +34 Spain (RedIRIS)
- +351 Portugal (FCCN)
- +36 Hungary (NIIF)
- +370 Lithuania (LITNET)
- +371 Latvia (SigmaNet)
- +381 Serbia (AMRES)
- +385 Croatia (CARNET)
- +386 Slovenia (ARNES)
- +39 Italy (GARR)
- +40 Romania (RoEduNet)
- +41 Switzerland (SWITCH)
- +44 United Kingdom (Janet)
- +45 Denmark (NORDUnet)
- +46 Sweden (NORDUnet)
- +48 Poland (PSNC)

=== Asia-Pacific ===
- +61 Australia (AARNet)
- +64 New Zealand (REANNZ)
- +687 New Caledonia (RENATER)
- +689 French Polynesia (RENATER)
- +852 Hong Kong (Harnet)
- +91 India (ERNET)

=== North America ===
- +1 United States (Internet2)

=== Latin America ===
- +54 Argentina (INNOVA-RED)
- +55 Brazil (RNP)

=== Caribbean ===
- +590 Guadeloupe, Saint Barthélemy, Saint Martin (RENATER)
- +594 French Guiana (RENATER)
- +596 Martinique (RENATER)

=== Africa ===
- +262 Réunion, Mayotte (RENATER)
