= National research and education network =

Internet service provider type

A national research and education network (NREN) is a specialised internet service provider dedicated to supporting the needs of the research and education communities within a country.

It is usually distinguished by support for a high-speed backbone network, often offering dedicated channels for individual research projects.

In recent years, many NRENs have expanded their remit of services to include areas such as identity and access management, security, automation, and cloud offerings, while others have evolved into fully fledged digital transformation agencies for their respective national governments.

== List of NRENs by geographic area ==
=== East and Southern Africa ===
- UbuntuNet Alliance for Research and Education Networking - the Alliance of NRENs of East and Southern Africa
- Eb@le - DRC NREN
- EthERNet - Ethiopian NREN
- iRENALA - Malagasy NREN
- KENET - Kenyan NREN
- MAREN - Malawian NREN
- MoRENet - Mozambican NREN
- RENU - Ugandan NREN
- RwEdNet - Rwanda NREN
- SomaliREN - Somali NREN
- SudREN - Sudanese NREN
- TENET/SANReN - South African NREN
- TERNET - Tanzanian NREN
- Xnet - Namibian NREN
- ZAMREN - Zambian NREN

=== North Africa ===
- ASREN - Arab States Research and Education Network
- TUREN - Tunisian NREN
- MARWAN - Moroccan NREN
- ENREN - Egyptian NREN
- ARN (Algeria) - Algerian NREN
- SudREN - Sudanese NREN
- SomaliREN - Somali NREN

=== West and Central Africa ===
- WACREN - West and Central African Research and Education Network
- GARNET - Ghanaian NREN
- TogoRER - Togolese NREN
- GhREN - Ghanaian NREN
- MaliREN - Mali NREN
- Niger-REN - Nigerien NREN
- RITER - Côte d'Ivoire NREN
- SnRER - Senegalese NREN
- NgREN - Nigerian NREN
- Eko-Konnect Research and Education Network - Nigerian NREN
- LRREN - Liberia Research and Education Network

=== Asia Pacific ===
- APAN - Asia-Pacific Advanced Network
- AARNet - Australian NREN
- AfgREN - Afghanistan NREN
- BDREN - Bangladeshi NREN
- DrukREN - Druk REN
- CSTNET - China Science and Technology Network
- CERNET - China Education and Research Network
- ERNET - Indian NREN
- HARNET - Hong Kong NREN
- KOREN - South Korean NREN
- KREONET- South Korean NREN
- IDREN - Indonesian NREN
- LEARN - Sri Lankan NREN
- SINET - Japanese NREN
- MYREN - Malaysian NREN
- NKN - Indian NREN
- NREN - Nepal NREN
- NREN - Islamic Republic of Iran NREN
- REANNZ - New Zealand NREN
- PERN - Pakistani NREN
- PREGINET - Philippine NREN
- SingAREN - Singaporean NREN
- TWAREN - Taiwanese NREN
- UniNet - Thai NREN
- VinaRen - Vietnamese NREN
- CamREN - Cambodia NREN
- TEIN - Trans Eurasia Information Network

=== North America ===
- United States – although advocated since the 1980s, the U.S. does not have one single NREN.

Name	Type
Internet2	national
National LambdaRail	national [closed]
vBNS	national [closed]
Edge	state (New Jersey)
ESnet	national
NEREN	regional (New England)
CAAREN	regional (Washington metropolitan area)
CENIC	state (California)
CEN	state (Connecticut)
NEREN	regional (Midwest)
Illinois Century Network	state (Illinois)
KanREN	state (Kansas)
LEARN	state (Texas)
Merit Network	state (Michigan)
NERO	state (Oregon)
NCREN	state (North Carolina)
NYSERNet	state (New York)
OARnet	state (Ohio)
OneNet	state (Oklahoma)
OSHEAN	state (Rhode Island)
PeachNet	state (Georgia)
PennREN	state (Pennsylvania)
THEnet	state (Texas)
UEN	state (Utah)
WVNET	state (West Virginia)
WiscNet	state (Wisconsin)

- Canada

Name	Type
CANARIE	national
ACORN-NL	provincial (Newfoundland and Labrador)
ACORN-NS	provincial (Nova Scotia)
BCNET	provincial (British Columbia)
Cybera	provincial (Alberta)
GTAnet	provincial (Ontario)
ECN	provincial (New Brunswick and Prince Edward Island)
MRnet	provincial (Manitoba)
ORION	provincial (Ontario)
RISQ	provincial (Quebec)
SRNet	provincial (Saskatchewan)

=== Latin America ===
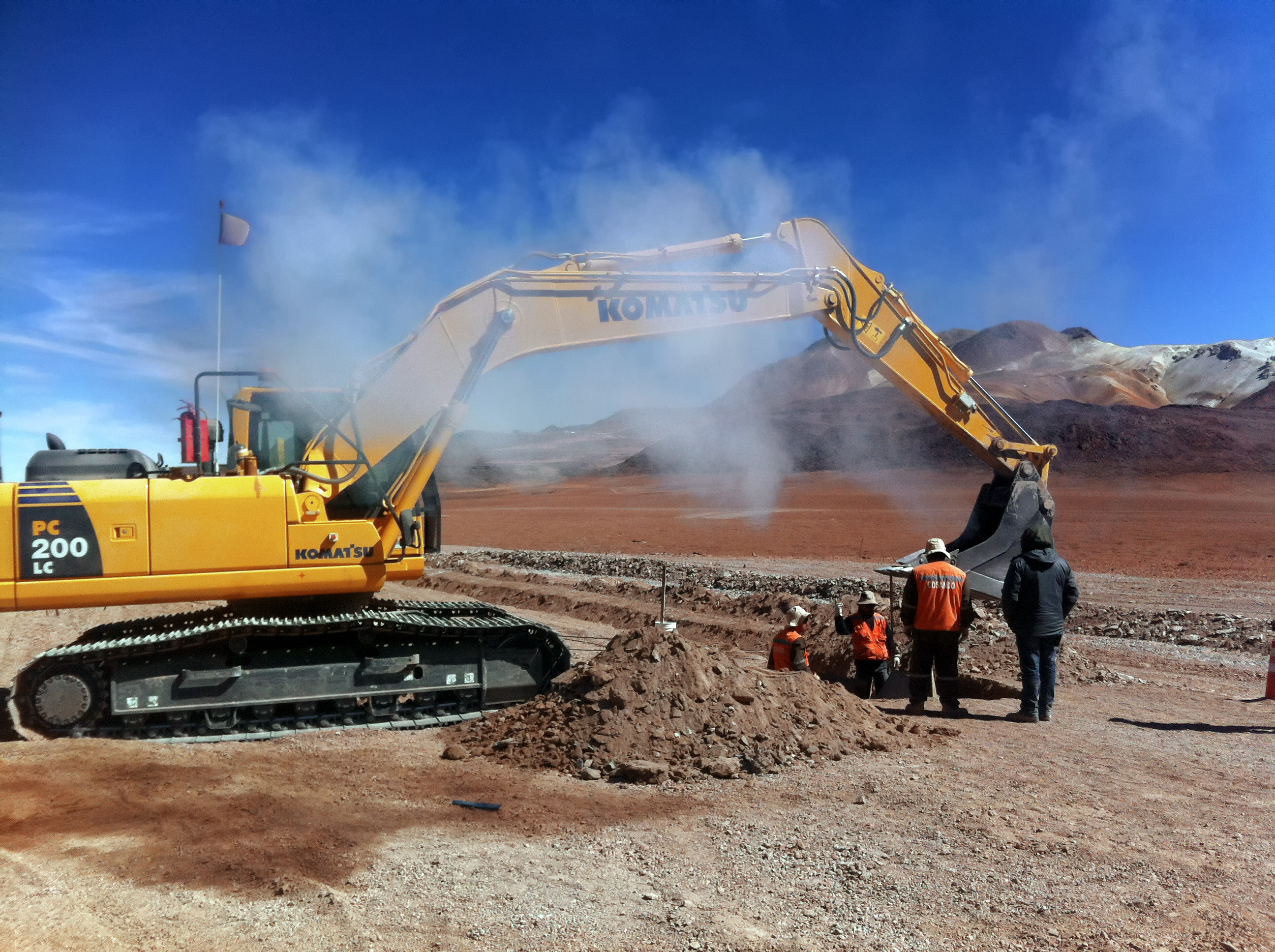
High-speed Fibre Optic Data Link to ALMA and REUNA.

- RedCLARA - Cooperación Latino Americana de Redes Avanzadas (Association of Latin American NRENs)
- Innova-Red - Argentinian NREN
- ADSIB - Bolivian NREN
- RNP - Brazilian NREN
- REUNA - Chilean NREN
- RENATA - Colombian NREN
- RedCONARE - Costa Rican NREN
- CEDIA - Ecuadorian NREN
- RAICES - El Salvadoran NREN
- RAGIE - Guatemalan NREN
- Universidad Tecnológica Centroamericana (UNITEC) - Honduran NREN
- CUDI - Mexican NREN
- RENIA - Nicaraguan NREN
- RedCyT - Panamanian NREN
- Arandu - Paraguayan NREN
- RAAP - Peruvian NREN
- RAU - Uruguayan NREN
- REACCIUN CNTI?- Venezuelan NREN

=== Caribbean ===
- C@ribNET - Caribbean NREN
- TTRENT - Trinidad and Tobago NREN
- JREN - Jamaica NREN
- RADEI - NREN of the Dominican Republic

=== Europe ===
- GÉANT - Develops and maintains the GÉANT backbone network on behalf of European NRENs. Formerly DANTE and TERENA.
- RASH Albanian NREN
- ASNET-AM - Armenian NREN
- ACOnet - Austrian NREN
- AzScienceNet Azerbaijan NREN
- BASNET - Belarus NREN
- Belnet - Belgian NREN
- BREN - Bulgarian NREN
- CESNET - Czech NREN
- CARNET - Croatian NREN
- CYNET - Cypriot NREN
- EENet - Estonian NREN
- RENATER - French NREN
- Deutsches Forschungsnetz (DFN) - German NREN
- GRENA - Georgian NREN
- GRNET - Greek NREN
- Pro-M/NIIF Program - Hungarian NREN
- HEAnet - Irish NREN; merged with EduCampus in 2025 to form Asiera
- GARR - Italian NREN
- KREN - Kosovan NREN
- SigmaNet - Latvian NREN
- LITNET - Lithuanian NREN
- RESTENA - Luxembourg NREN
- MARNET - Macedonian NREN
- RiċerkaNet - Maltese NREN
- RENAM - Moldovian NREN
- MREN - Montenegro NREN
- SURF - Netherlands NREN (formerly SURFnet)
- PIONIER (PSNC) - Polish NREN
- FCCN - Portuguese NREN
- RoEduNet - Romanian NREN
- RUNNet - Russian NREN
- AMRES - Serbian NREN
- ARNES - Slovenian NREN
- SANET - Slovakian NREN
- RedIRIS - Spanish NREN
- SWITCH - Swiss NREN
- ULAKBIM - Turkish NREN
- URAN - Ukrainian NREN
- Jisc - United Kingdom NREN, operator of the Janet network
- European Academic and Research Network - EARN, predecessor of TERENA after merging with RARE
- CEENet - Central and Eastern European Research Networking Association

=== Nordic countries ===
- NORDUnet - Nordic backbone network
  - DeiC - Danish NREN
  - FUNET - Finnish NREN
  - RHnet - Icelandic NREN
  - SUNET - Swedish NREN
  - Sikt - Norwegian NREN

=== Middle East ===
- Maeen Saudi Arabia NREN
- Eumedconnect - Mediterranean/North African Backbone
- ANKABUT UAE NREN
- OMREN Omani NREN
- IUCC - Israeli NREN
- JUnet Jordanian NREN
- IRAN SHOA Iranian NREN
- PALNREN Palestinian NREN
- Lebanon
- Birzeit Uni/AlQuds Palestinian Authority
- QNREN - Qatar NREN
- HIAST Syrian NREN

=== Central Asia ===
- RUNNet - Russian University Network, Russian NREN
- ASNET-AM - Armenian
- AzScienceNet Azerbaijan NREN
- GRENA - Georgian NREN
- KazRENA - Kazakhstan NREN
- KRENA - Kyrgyzstan NREN
- TuRENA - Turkmenistan NREN
- UZSCINET - Uzbekistan NREN

== See also ==
- Information superhighway
- Libraries and the US National Research and Education Network
