= DANTE =

Delivery of Advanced Network Technology to Europe
- Abbreviation: DANTE
- Formation: 6 July 1993
- Legal status: Company limited by shares
- Purpose: Research networking
- Headquarters: Cambridge, United Kingdom
- Region served: Europe
- President: Bob Day
- Main organ: Board of directors
- Website: www.dante.net

Delivery of Advanced Network Technology to Europe (DANTE) was a not-for-profit company that planned, built, and operated consecutive generations of the backbone network that interconnects the national research and education networks (NRENs) in Europe. The organisation was based in Cambridge, United Kingdom and was formed in 1993 as a limited liability company owned by Réseaux Associés pour la Recherche Européenne (RARE). Ownership was transferred to a number of NRENs and government agencies in 1994.

DANTE Ltd. currently operates the third generation of the GÉANT pan-European backbone network, and previously operated the earlier-generation EuropaNET, TEN-34, TEN-155, GÉANT and GÉANT2 networks.

== History ==
At a first European research networking workshop, held in Luxembourg in May 1985, the NRENs decided to create the RARE association as their joint European organisation. The first few years were dominated by the Co-operation for Open Systems Interconnection Networking in Europe (COSINE) project (1985-1993). RARE was tasked with he execution of the project and created a COSINE Project Management Unit (CPMU) within its secretariat to manage the various sub-projects. One of the sub-projects of COSINE aimed to create a backbone network interconnecting the national research networks of the participating countries. The first two generations of the European backbone were developed as part of COSINE: IXI (International X.25 Infrastructure Backbone Service) and EMPB (European Multi-Protocol Backbone).

By 1991, consensus was growing that it would make sense to split off RARE's Operational Unit from the association. In May 1991 RARE created a task force to examine the possibility of creating a new entity to take responsibility for the provision of pan-European backbone services; the task force's proposals were accepted by the RARE membership in December 1991. After a comparison of alternatives it was decided to found the Operational Unit as a company limited by shares under English law with its headquarters in Cambridge. The company was incorporated on 30 March 1993 as Operational Unit Ltd. and changed its name to DANTE Ltd. on 2 July 1993. The organisation was launched at an event at St John's College, Cambridge on 6 July 1993. Initially, all shares were owned by RARE, but on 25 March 1994 RARE transferred its shares to eleven NRENs and government agencies. On 20 October 1994 RARE changed its name to TERENA.

The original eleven shareholders were Ariadnet (Greece), ARNES (Slovenia), INFN (Italy), DFN (Germany), FCCN (Portugal), HEFCE (United Kingdom), HUNGARNET (Hungary), NORDUnet (Nordic countries), RedIRIS (Spain), SURFnet (Netherlands) and SWITCH (Switzerland). Later INFN and RedIRIS transferred their shares to GARR and CSIC, respectively. Other NRENs were given the opportunity to buy shares later; this offer was taken up by RENATER (France) and CESNET (Czech Republic) in 1999, by HEAnet (Ireland) in 2000 and by RESTENA (Luxembourg) in 2002, bringing the total number of shareholders to fifteen.

== Generations of the European backbone ==
IXI and EMPB were the first two generations of the backbone network interconnecting the national research networks in Europe, known today as GÉANT. The consecutive generations can be characterised as follows.

- IXI (International X.25 Infrastructure Backbone Service) 1990-1992. IXI was funded by a large number of national governments and the European Commission through the EUREKA project COSINE. IXI started as an X.25-based network with access capacities of 64 kbit/s in 14 countries. However, the switches were already equipped with 2 Mbit/s access ports and the first of these was brought into service before the end of 1992. In the first months of 1993, a new IP pilot service supported the carriage of IP packets by X.25. The first native IP port was installed in the second quarter of 1993. By this time, the name IXI had clearly become inappropriate and the network was renamed EMPB.
- EMPB (European Multi-Protocol Backbone) 1992-1995. During the 37 months of operation several upgrades were made to the initial configuration. Four Central European countries joined the network. Research networks upgraded their access capacity to 2 Mbit/s, trunk circuits on the busiest routes were upgraded to 8 Mbit/s, and 4 Mbit/s access ports were made available and became operational.
- EuropaNet 1995-1997. This was the first network managed by DANTE, using British Telecom's International Backbone Data Network Service (IBDNS) as the carrier. Access ports were available in capacities from 64 kbit/s to 8 Mbit/s for the IP service and 64 or 128 kbit/s for X.25. In July 1996 the EuropaNet IP service was moved from IBDNS to the new Integrated Network Connection Service (INCS) and remained there until March 1998 when the last NRENs moved their traffic to the new TEN-34 backbone.
- TEN-34 1997-1998. The backbone network was co-funded by the European Union through a project in the EU's Fourth Framework Programme (February 1996 - December 1998). TEN-34 offered speeds of 34 Mbit/s using both IP and ATM.
- TEN-155 1998-2001. TEN-155 was co-funded by the European Union through a project in the EU's Fourth Framework Programme called QUANTUM (October 1998 - May 2000). At the start, the network had access capacities of 155 Mbit/s in eight European countries. Many upgrades followed, and by December 2000 TEN-155 had trunk lines of 34/45, 155, 2×155, 3×155 and 622 Mbit/s.
- GÉANT 2001-2005. The GÉANT network was co-funded by the European Union through a project in the Fifth Framework Programme called GN1 (November 2000 - October 2004). GÉANT consisted of a core network at 10 Gbit/s, complemented by 2.5 Gbit/s connections, with smaller outlying countries connected at 34, 155 or 622 Mbit/s.
- GÉANT2 2006-2009. The GÉANT2 network was co-funded by the European Union through a project in the Sixth Framework Programme called GN2 (September 2004 - August 2008). GÉANT2 was the first generation set up as a dark fibre network, offering switched point-to-point connections in addition to normal IP traffic.
- GÉANT 2009-2013. It was decided to use the name GÉANT for the next-generation backbone, rather than GÉANT3. The new GÉANT network was co-funded by the European Union through a project in the Seventh Framework Programme called GN3 (April 2009 - March 2013).
- GÉANT 2013-2015. Funding of the GÉANT network was continued through a successor project in the Seventh Framework Programme called GN3PLUS (April 2013 - March 2015).

== Current GÉANT network ==
DANTE Ltd. currently operates the third generation of the GÉANT backbone network that interconnects Europe's National Research and Education Networks (NRENs). Together GÉANT and the NRENs connect 40 million researchers and students across Europe, facilitating collaborative research in a diverse range of disciplines, including high-energy physics, radio astronomy, bio-medicine, climate change, earth observation, and arts and culture.

Over 10,000 terabytes of data are transferred every day via the GÉANT IP backbone. GÉANT's can be tailor its services and infrastructure to individual user requirements. GÉANT offers very large network capacities: key routes on the GÉANT network run at 40 Gbit/s and upgrades to 100 Gbit/s are in progress. GÉANT offers services such as: IP and dedicated circuits, testbeds and virtualised resources, monitoring and troubleshooting, and advisory and support services.

Access to the GÉANT network provides the standard, high-bandwidth IP connectivity (GÉANT IP). In addition, GÉANT offers virtual private networks created by reserving capacity on the network backbone (GÉANT Plus and GÉANT Lambda). These specialised point-to-point connections provide dedicated bandwidth. The connectivity services are supported by a range of network monitoring, security and support services aimed at optimising the network performance, These services work to provide seamless access to the infrastructure and enhanced monitoring to identify and remedy any incidents that disrupt the data flow and by eliminating attempts to disrupt service by maintaining high levels of network security.

== Global connectivity ==
Connectivity between GÉANT and research networks in North America is part of the EU-funded projects mentioned above. In addition, DANTE is involved in a number of EU-funded projects to provide connectivity between GÉANT and research networks in other world regions. These include ORIENTPLUS for connectivity to China, TEIN3 for connectivity to the Asia-Pacific region, EUMEDCONNECT3 for the southern and eastern Mediterranean, CAREN for Central Asia, and AfricaConnect for sub-Saharan Africa.
