= CERN Internet Exchange Point =

Internet exchange point in Switzerland

- Full name: CERN Internet Exchange Point
- Abbreviation: CIXP
- Founded: 1 January 1996
- Location: Geneva, Switzerland
- Website: Official website

The CERN Internet Exchange Point (CIXP) is a carrier-neutral Internet exchange point located at CERN in Geneva, Switzerland. Formally established on 1 January 1996, it is operated jointly by CERN and Equinix and is distributed across three sites in Geneva. CERN is one of the largest sources of scientific data in the world, and uses the exchange to optimise the Internet connectivity it needs to distribute that data to hundreds of collaborating institutes worldwide. CIXP is a founding member of the European Internet Exchange Association (Euro-IX).

== History ==
CERN is a historical European Internet landmark: in 1989 the first pan-European Internet backbone was established through CERN, and in 1990 the first T1 connection to NSFnet in the United States was made, at a then-record trans-Atlantic speed of 1.5 Mbit/s.

The CIXP was formally established on 1 January 1996 using standard Ethernet switching technology. Following the deregulation of the European telecommunications industry that year, it became one of the first carrier-neutral Internet exchange points in the world. According to CERN, it has been a driving force behind the development of the Internet in nearby France and Switzerland since then.

The exchange was later extended over dark fibre to a second neutral location in Geneva, Telehouse Switzerland SA, which is now owned by Equinix. CIXP was one of the first IXPs to incorporate an all-optical photonic switch, made by Glimmerglass, into its infrastructure, both for operational flexibility and to gain experience with new modes of operation such as on-demand optical wavelengths ("lambdas").

CIXP has been part of Euro-IX since the association's first meeting in October 2001.

In November 2012 Equinix opened a second data centre in Geneva, and the CIXP was extended to include it. The three sites – CERN, Equinix GV1 and Equinix GV2 – are linked by a redundant optical ring.

== Technical details ==
The CIXP is a distributed layer 2 infrastructure built on Juniper switches, offering switched ports at 10 Mbit/s, 100 Mbit/s, 1 Gbit/s and 10 Gbit/s. 1 Gbit/s ports are available as 1000BASE-T, 1000BASE-SX and 1000BASE-LX, and 10 Gbit/s ports as 10GBASE-SR and 10GBASE-LR. Both IPv4 and IPv6 addresses are provided for peering.

Connecting to the exchange does not provide any automatic connectivity; each member is responsible for arranging its own peering agreements or transit services with other networks, whether on the CIXP or elsewhere.

== Membership ==
CIXP is open to all Internet service providers. Its natural partners are ISPs with a point of presence in Switzerland or France, but membership is open to any organisation that can benefit from peering its IP traffic. Before connecting, an ISP must:

- have peering agreements with at least two ISPs already connected to the CIXP;
- have its own autonomous system number and register its routing policy in the RIPE routing registry;
- order and install its own line to the CIXP, and supply its own router, clearly labelled as belonging to the ISP.

Members are responsible for the installation, configuration, management and fault handling of their own equipment. CIXP support staff assist with problem resolution on a best-effort basis during working hours.

=== Participants ===
As of October 2026, the CIXP lists the following participants.

Internet service providers (with connection site)

- Adeli (CERN)
- Akamai (CERN)
- Akenes (Equinix GV1)
- BIT (Swiss Confederation) (CERN)
- Briod SA (Equinix GV1)
- BSO (Equinix GV1)
- CERN (CERN)
- Cogent (CERN; Equinix GV1)
- COLT (CERN)
- CSTI (Equinix GV1)
- Deutsche Telekom AG (CERN)
- DFI Services (Equinix GV1)
- Equinix (Equinix GV1, GV2)
- euNetworks (formerly Fibrelac)
- Eurofiber (Equinix GV1)
- Forcepoint (Equinix GV1)
- GTT (CERN)
- Hurricane Electric (Equinix GV1)
- Infomaniak Network SA (CERN)
- Init7 (CERN)
- IP-Max (CERN)
- IP-Max route collector (Equinix GV1)
- Jaguar Network (Equinix GV1)
- K-Net / K-Sys (CERN)
- K-root (RIPE) (CERN)
- MilkyWan (CERN)
- Netplus (Equinix GV1)
- Netskope Switzerland GmbH (Equinix GV1)
- NEXEREN XEFI (Equinix GV2)
- NTS Workspace (CERN)
- OCSIN (CERN)
- Orange Business Services – GIBN (CERN)
- Packet Clearing House AS3856 (Equinix GV2)
- Packet Clearing House AS42 (Equinix GV2)
- Philunet (CERN)
- Planisware (Equinix GV1)
- RIPE-RIS (CERN)
- SIG Telecom (CERN; Equinix GV1, GV2)
- SIL Citycable (Equinix GV1)
- Sunrise (CERN)
- Sunrise (ex-UPC) (Equinix GV1)
- Swisscom / IP-Plus (CERN)
- The Net (Equinix GV1)
- VTX Services SA (Equinix GV1)
- Zscaler (Equinix GV1)

Telecom operators

- BICS (Belgacom International Carrier Services)
- Cloudflare
- Cogent
- COLT
- euNetworks (formerly Fibrelac)
- Eurofiber
- Gas&Com
- GTT
- Hurricane Electric
- Interoute
- Lumen (formerly CenturyLink, Level 3, Global Crossing)
- Microsoft
- Netnod AB
- Neuf-Cegetel
- SIEA
- SIG Telecom
- Sunrise
- Sunrise (ex-UPC)
- Swisscom / IP-Plus
- VTX Services SA
- Zayo Group (formerly Viatel)

Research and education networks

- ESnet
- GÉANT
- NORDUnet
- RENATER
- SWITCH

Remote Internet exchanges

- LyonIX

== See also ==
- List of Internet exchange points
- CERN
