= SANET =

National research and education network

Slovak Academic Network
- Abbreviation: SANET
- Formation: 2001
- Legal status: Association
- Headquarters: Bratislava, Slovakia
- Region served: Slovakia
- President of the Board of Directors: Pavol Horváth
- Main organ: General Assembly
- Website: www.sanet.sk/

SANET (Slovak academic network) is the national research and education networking organisation of Slovakia. The SANET association is a non-profit organisation whose members contribute to the operations of the network. It is a member of TERENA.

== Network services ==
The SANET network connects locations in 23 towns. The network infrastructure is based on leased dark fibres. The network topology is configured as two rings providing full resilience with a maximum delay of 5 ms. Connectivity to the domestic commodity Internet is realised through an Ethernet link at 10 Gbit/s to the Slovak Internet exchange point SIX located in the Computer Center of the Slovak University of Technology in Bratislava. International connectivity is provided through cross-border dark fibres at 10 Gbit/s to the ACOnet node in Vienna, the CESNET node in Brno and the PIONIER node in Bielsko-Biała, as well as local links in Bratislava to the points of presence of GÉANT (1 Gbit/s) and of GTS (2 Gbit/s).

== Other services ==
Besides access to the SANET network, the European academic backbone network GÉANT and the global Internet, SANET provides web hosting, email hosting and DNS hosting as services to its user community. SANET is also the National Roaming Operator for the worldwide eduroam roaming service. In 2011 SANET joined the TERENA Certificate Service, enabling the provision of server certificates to its connected institutions.
