= BREN =

Bulgarian Research and Education Network

Bulgarian Research and Education Network
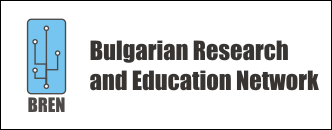
- Company type: Not-for-profit
- Founded: 1990
- Headquarters: Sofia, Bulgaria
- Website: http://www.bren.bg

BREN (Bulgarian Research and Education Network) is both the name of the Bulgarian National research and education network as well as the name of the Association that plans, deploys and maintains it.

BREN provides high-speed network that interconnects Bulgarian universities and other research and educational institutions in Bulgaria.

BREN network is connected to the pan-European research and education network GEANT via 1Gbit link.

BREN participates in international projects like 6Deploy, GEANT2, GEANT3 and is a member of TERENA, CEENet

== See also ==
- National research and education network
- GEANT
- GEANT2
- DANTE (pan-European research network)
- TERENA
