= ACOnet =

Verein zur Förderung eines österreichischen, wissenschaftlichen Datennetzes
- Abbreviation: ACONET
- Formation: 1986
- Legal status: Association
- Purpose: To promote the academic computer network Aconet, in particular its further development and its use by public research in Austria
- Headquarters: Vienna, Austria
- Region served: Austria
- Main organ: Member Assembly
- Website: www.aco.net

ACOnet is the name of the national research and education network in Austria. The ACONET association promotes the development and use of that network. ACOnet is not managed and operated by ACONET, but by a unit in the Computing Centre of the University of Vienna that also operates the Vienna Internet Exchange. The University of Vienna represents ACOnet internationally, for example as a member of TERENA and as a participant in the project that funds the European backbone network GÉANT.

== History ==
In 1981 the computer centres of the Austrian universities and the Ministry for Science and Research started the development of ACOnet. The first international connectivity was obtained in 1985, with connections to EARN and EUnet. The national EARN node was located at the University of Linz. The ACONET association, of which the computer centres of all Austrian universities are members, was founded in 1986. In that year ACOnet also joined RARE, the European association of National Research and Education Networking organisations. In 1994 the EARN association merged with RARE, and at the same time RARE changed its name to TERENA.

A common, vendor-independent communications infrastructure for ACOnet was established in the second half of the 1990s.

In its first phase, ACOnet set up a private X.25 network, which connected the universities in Vienna, Graz, Leoben, Klagenfurt, Innsbruck, Salzburg and Linz in a ring topology. Connection speeds were initially 9.6 kbit/s and later 64 kbit/s.

In 1990 the University of Vienna obtained connectivity to the Internet thanks to the European Academic Supercomputer Initiative (EASI) of IBM, with a connection to Geneva at 64 kbit/s, from where a 1.5 Mbit/s connection to NSFNET in the United States could be used (EASINET). In the same year also the other Austrian universities could relatively quickly be connected to the Internet.

The year 1992 saw the replacement of the X.25 network by an IP network. In this stage the core of ACOnet was a triangular backbone with data connections linking the multi-protocol ACOnet routers in the universities in Vienna, Linz and Graz, to which the other locations were connected. Connection speeds in this stage were 64 and 128 kbit/s.

The growing traffic on the ACOnet network and the need to introduce new services that required higher bandwidths made a further transition and upgrade necessary. In 1994 the universities of Vienna, Linz, Salzburg, Innsbruck, Klagenfurt, Leoben and Graz were connected to the Metropolitan Area Network (MAN) service of Post und Telekom Austria (PTA) with a bandwidth of 2 Mbit/s. The MAN was a public service based on SMDS technology, connecting customers in the whole country.

In 1996 ATM technology was introduced in parts of the ACOnet carrier network, to cater for the fast increasing bandwidth needs in especially the locations Vienna, Linz and Graz. In 1997 also the university locations in Salzburg, Innsbruck, Klagenfurt and Leoben went over to ATM technology, so that ACOnet had once again a uniform backbone network.

In 2001 access to the network in Vienna, Linz, Salzburg, Innsbruck and Klagenfurt was transferred to Gigabit Ethernet. In 2004 also Leoben and the new Point of Presence in Eisenstadt went over to Gigabit Ethernet. In 2005 the interconnects in Vienna were upgraded to 10 Gbit/s.

== The network ==
ACOnet offers a high-performance network infrastructure based on DWDM technology and 10-Gigabit Ethernet, connecting all university locations and offering connectivity to international networks. ACOnet provides full Internet connectivity and numerous Internet services. The ACOnet backbone connects the Points of Presence in Vienna, Linz, Salzburg, Innsbruck, Dornbirn, Klagenfurt, Leoben, Graz and Eisenstadt. In addition, in 2009 possibilities to connect to ACOnet were created in Sankt Pölten and Krems. The current ACOnet network is based on a wavelength transparent fibre optic backbone, allowing several 10-Gbit/s channels per connection. All ACOnet points of presence are resiliently connected.

ACOnet offers a multi-10-Gbit/s Ethernet backbone, multi-10-Gbit/s Internet access, multi-10-Gbit/s connectivity to research networks in Europe and beyond via GÉANT, multi-10-Gbit/s connectivity to the Vienna Internet Exchange for fast handling of regional data traffic, cross-border fibre connections to CESNET in the Czech Republic and SANET in Slovakia, global IPv4 and IPv6 connectivity, and global IPv4 and IPv6 multicast.

== Services ==
Since December 2010, the Government Internet Exchange (GovIX) is a service operated by ACOnet and three other organisations.

AConet offers a local Internet registry providing IPv4 and IPv6 addresses to its customers and partners.

The ACOnet Identity Federation provides a federated identity service, bringing together identity providers and service providers in the Austrian research and education community.

ACOnet is the National Roaming Operator for the eduroam service in Austria.

ACOnet participates in the TERENA Certificate Service, offering server, code-signing and personal certificates to the ACOnet participants.

ACOnet-CERT is the Computer Security Incident Response Team (CSIRT) for the Austrian academic community.
