= Pigcam =

Forest webcamera which broadcast activities from wild game feeding area in Estonia

The Wild Pig Cam or Pigcam (Estonian: notsukaamera), officially Forest Webcam (Estonian: Metsakaamera), also known as Pig TV (Estonian: Sea-TV) was a joint project of looduskalender.ee (:et) and EENet involving a publicly accessible webcam placed near a wild game feeding area in a forest near Tartu, Estonia. In 2008–2009, the project was started on 11 December 2008 and made public on 23 January 2009. The camera's common name comes from a pack of wild pigs being the feeding area's most regular visitors; however, other species such as moose and raccoon dog were also seen multiple times.

The Pigcam and the related Owlcam are two of the most famous such public wildlife webcams in Estonia. By completion, both had attracted millions of visitors from more than hundred countries.

== Sources ==
- looduskalender.ee, 10 December 2008: Metsakaamera
- reisijutud.com, 11 December 2008: Metsakaamera alustas taas - jõulud veedame metssigadega
- Postimees, 18 February 2009: Metsakaamera läheneb miljoni vaataja piirile by Madis Filippov
- Reporter, 18 February 2009 20:17: Metsakaamera meelitab inimesi loomade ellu piiluma
