= PIONIER =

Polish academic research network

PIONIER (transl. pioneer) is the Polish national research and education network used mainly by national and European academic institutions for scientific research, as well as for the development and testing of pilot information society services. PIONIER encompasses high-performance computing infrastructure and a growing network ecosystem with terabit capacities, offering services that support digital innovation and contributing to open science as part of the European Open Science Cloud (EOSC) initiative within the European Union.

The network is connected to European scientific networks and computer centers, such as CERN, GÉANT, DFN, as well as scientific networks of neighboring countries. It has direct access to resources at several key traffic exchange points in Poland and abroad, including AMS-IX (100 Gbps), DE-CIX (100 Gbps), CIXP (100 Gbps) and PLIX (4×10 Gbps).

PIONIER was created through the establishment of the PIONIER Consortium in 2003, which consists of 22 academic MANs (including 5 high-performance computing centers), and is operated by the Poznań Supercomputing and Networking Center as the successor to the POL-34 and POL-155 networks.

The total length of PIONIER fiber optic lines is 10,958 km (6,809 mi), of which 6,878 km (4,274 mi) in Poland and 4,080 km (2,540 mi) abroad. The network achieved 100% availability in 2024, with a median availability of 99.9998% over the past nine years, equating to approximately 63 seconds of downtime annually.

== History ==
POL-34 was created as a result of an experiment hosted in Poznań in 1997 during a scientific conference in which the representatives of all major Polish MAN's took part. Its target was to create a high-speed WAN. During the experiment Poznań, Łódź and Gdańsk were connected and the 34 Mbit/s ATM network in a 622 Mbit/s SDH environment has been created and since then called POL-34. Since its creation, POL-34 has been a purely Internet Protocol network.

In the beginning, POL-34 used fiber-optic links leased from TEL-ENERGO, a company founded by State Power Companies, Polish Power Networks and Polish Power Distribution Association. At the same time, ever since its creation POL-34 was in the process of creating its own infrastructure. Today the Consortium owns all fiber-optic connections to major nodes.

In 1999 a project to extend the bandwidth of the network was proposed and POL-155 was created. Speed was expanded to 155 Mbit/s Asynchronous Transfer Mode between Gdańsk, Łódź and Poznań and a constant effort to create 155 Mbit/s links between smaller nodes was made.

In 2000 POL-34/155 and various other academic organisations set up a project of creating a 10 Gbit/s network within GEANT project. Network called PIONIER is the result of that project.

== Organization ==
Currently the network connects Białystok, Bielsko-Biała, Bydgoszcz, Częstochowa, Gdańsk, Gliwice, Kielce, Kraków, Lublin, Łódź, Opole, Poznań, Puławy, Radom, Toruń, Warsaw, Wrocław, Koszalin, Szczecin, Olsztyn and Zielona Góra with a fiber-optic 10 Gbit/s patch-cord, and consists of 5738,86 km of optical fiber. PIONIER's Network Operations Center is based in Poznań Supercomputing and Networking Center.

It has connections to various commercial networks, national research and education networks (CESNET, DFN, SANET, URAN), and is well integrated with the GÉANT network.

Both POL-34/155 and PIONIER is operated by a consortium of 22 metropolitan area network operators and other educational institutions. Decisions within the consortium are made by voting.

== See also ==
- Naukowa i Akademicka Sieć Komputerowa
