= Sudanese Universities Information Network =

Sudanese Research and Education Network

The Sudanese Research and Education Network (SudREN), formerly known as the Sudanese Universities Information Network (SUIN), is the national research and education network in Sudan. In 2004, SUIN was first founded and developed under the umbrella of the Ministry of Higher Education and Scientific Research. Since the beginning of October 2009, SUIN has been operational under the umbrella of the Association of Sudanese Universities, which is a non-governmental organization (NGO) body for all tertiary education and research institutions in Sudan. A Memorandum of Understanding (MoU) was signed between thirty universities (ASU members), with a main objective to support the establishment of SUIN as a legal independent body.

== History ==
The Sudanese Universities Information Network (SUIN) began in 2004 as an initiative under the Ministry of Higher Education, originally launched as the Sudanese Virtual Library (SUVL). Its goal was to enhance access to academic content across 30 public universities using a frame relay network connected through a central server at the University of Khartoum. Universities contributed over 250,000 digital records, and SUVL provided access to global academic platforms like WHO Hinari, AGORA, and Oxford University Press. During this period, Sudan's telecom sector, including Sudatel and Canar Telecom, had laid extensive but underutilized fiber infrastructure across the country.

To leverage this infrastructure, SUVL was restructured into SUIN, with the mission of building a national research and education network (NREN). Backed by funding from the National Telecommunication Corporation (NTC), SUIN connected 12 universities between 2008–2009 and received 15 Mbps of shared internet through a Network operation center (NOC) at the University of Khartoum. A major upgrade followed in 2011 with a 155 Mbps STM-1 connection from Sudatel. Governance transitioned from the Ministry to the Association of Sudanese Universities (ASU) in 2009, and in 2010 SUIN was licensed as an ISP. To align with other African NRENs in the UbuntuNet Alliance, SUIN was eventually rebranded as SudREN.

== Objective ==
It provides broadband connectivity among Sudanese research and educational institutions, with other NRENs in Africa and the rest of the world. Additional objectives aim to increase sharing of knowledge and collaboration for research, education and development activities.

== Overall goal ==
It promotes research and education networking among post-secondary education and research institutions by pooling of resources and sharing the cost of common software and e-services.

== Sources ==
- Rafaa A. Ghobrial and Sami M. Sharif (1–3 July 2009). Planning for Building Digital Memory of the Sudan "DMS". 1st International Conference on African Digital Libraries and Archives. Addis Ababa, Ethiopia. Archived from the original on 14 June 2011. "The Sudanese Universities Virtual Library (SUVL) part of a project of Sudanese Universities Information Network (SUIN), which aims to support educational activities and research and promotion methods gain knowledge and the development of management systems and modernization of the university by providing books, journals and electronic teaching materials, research and management information (direct and indirect) by using tools based on information technology and communications"
