= IRENALA =

Research and education network in Madagascar

Research and Education Network for Academic and Learning Activities
- Abbreviation: iRENALA
- Formation: 7 June 2012 in Toamasina
- Legal status: Association
- Headquarters: Antananarivo, Madagascar
- Region served: Madagascar
- President: Lala Andriamampianina
- Main organ: General Assembly
- Website: www.irenala.edu.mg

The Research and Education Network for Academic and Learning Activities (iRENALA) is the national research and education networking organisation (NREN) of Madagascar. iRENALA was incorporated in June 2012 as an association under Malagasy law. It is a member of the UbuntuNet Alliance.

== Objectives ==
The objectives of the association are:

- to provide the management for the creation of a national computer network for research, technological development and education;
- to assist the development of networks for professional science and technology and to ensure their national interconnection;
- to provide connections with national research and education networks of other countries and to participate in international and interconnection projects;
- to provide the management of electronic communication services, in particular address management, routing and numbering plans, and network directory services (DNS and reverse zone lookup), for the benefit of the entire research, technological development and education community;
- to provide the management for a range of services, applications and resources dedicated to higher education and research.

== The network ==
A partnership agreement between the Ministry of Higher Education and Scienfific Research and the Ministry of Post, Telecommunications and New Technologies from July 2011 has made it possible to implement a fibre-optic network. iRENALA has an international connectivity of 155 Mbit/s and 15 member organisations are connected via 22 interconnection sites. iRENALA is not involved in the management of the local networks of its member institutions, but it collaborates with the system and network administrators of each of the institutions to obtain standardisation at the national level. The national network infrastructure of iRENALA is based on a fibre-optic backbone of the telecom provider Telma (Telecom Malagasy).

== Services ==
Network-related services provided by iRENALA include a wiki that serves as a portal for information about the evolution of the network and accompanying services, a teleconferencing and collaborative work service, web hosting, and domain name management. For teachers and students iRENALA provides a portal of education resources as a virtual university library. For researchers iRENALA runs the Madagascar Digital Library as well as an information service about Madagascar scientific publications and news.
