= RENAM =

Research and education networking organization in Moldova

Research and Educational Networking Association of Moldova
- Abbreviation: RENAM Association
- Formation: June 1999
- Legal status: Association
- Purpose: To establish and develop computer network and information services on a modern level mostly in higher and secondary education, research institutions, libraries and public collections
- Headquarters: Chișinău, Moldova
- Region served: Moldova
- Co-Presidents: Ion Tighineanu and Ion Bostan
- Main organ: Council of the Association
- Website: www.renam.md

The Research and Educational Networking Association of Moldova (RENAM) is the national research and education networking organisation (NREN) of Moldova. RENAM was incorporated in June 1999 as an association under Moldovan law. It is a member of TERENA.

== Objectives ==
The principal purpose of RENAM is the constant development of the communication and information infrastructure of the scientific and educational community as well as governmental organisations, in Moldova. The aim of the association is to establish and develop computer network and information services on a modern level mostly in higher and secondary education, research institutions, libraries and public collections. Furthermore, the continuous and active participation in the work of international computer network organisations is also set as an aim.

== The network ==
RENAM provides connectivity and information services to research institutions, universities, secondary schools, hospitals and other medical institutions, libraries and museums. The infrastructure connects 23 institutes of the Moldovan Academy of Sciences, ten leading universities, more than ten colleges, three hospitals and some government institutions. The network provides connectivity to about 5,000 scientists and professors, 1,000 PhD students and more than 80,000 university and colleges students.

In Chișinău, RENAM has a fibre optic infrastructure of more than 50 km. The core network backbone in Chișinău is based on dark fibre connections and Gigabit Ethernet technology, and provides high-speed access to the national Internet exchange point. Separate distant campuses are connected by wireless point-to-point connections with up to 24 Mbit/s capacity. Peripheral research and education centres are linked using microwave radio-relay technology and leased lines from other telecommunications operators.

RENAM's national backbone has a capacity of 1 Gbit/s and 1,400 km of leased lambda lines. Main nodes are located in Chișinău, Bălți and Cahul. RENAM has a 10 Gbit/s connection to the GÉANT network via a cross-border fibre between Ungheni and the RoEduNet node in Iași.

== Services ==
Other services provided by RENAM include leased-line connections, design and production of websites, consulting, education and training, and a digital library services. RENAM is also responsible for the administration and registration of domain names under the .acad.md and .renam.md domains. MD-CERT is the Computer Security Incident Response Team (CSIRT) run by RENAM.
