= SURFnet =

Netherlands' network research organization

SURF
- Type: Not-for-profit company limited by shares
- Industry: NREN
- Founded: 1987
- Headquarters: Utrecht, Utrecht, The Netherlands
- Number of locations: 2
- Area served: The Netherlands
- Services: Research networking
- Website: www.surf.nl

SURFnet
- Founded: 1988
- Defunct: 31 December 2020

SURF (short for Samenwerkende Universitaire Rekenfaciliteiten, "Cooperating University Computing Facilities") is an organization that develops, implements and maintains the national research and education network (NREN) of the Netherlands. It operates the national research network formally called SURFnet.

SURF as a network is a backbone computer network reserved for higher education and research in the Netherlands. SURF is a cooperative association of Dutch educational and research institutions in which the members combine their strengths. They work together to acquire or develop digital services and to encourage knowledge sharing through continuous innovation. The members are the owners of SURF.

== History ==
The organization was established in 1987, it started supplying IP connectivity services in 1989, deploying the TCP/IP suite. SURFnet has deployed a series of network generations in an overbuilt manner. The initial SURFnet network was based on 9.6 kbit/s and 64 kbit/s X.25 connections, providing DECNET protocol. SURFnet2 was established in 1989 and delivered TCP/IP over an X.25 network. The SURFnet3 network delivered native TCP/IP via leased lines and became operational in 1991, mainly consisting of 64 kbit/s and 2 Mbit/s lines. In 1994 SURFnet4 was developed based on ATM and, later on SDH, links. SURFnet5 was developed from 1999 onward on a 10 Gbit/s DWDM infrastructure, with access links of 100 Mbit/s and 1 Gbit/s.

SURFnet6, the sixth generation of the SURFnet network, was taken into operation at the beginning of 2006. This network provides the 750,000 users in higher education and research with Internet facilities, and also provides them with "lightpaths", which are direct connections between two network nodes without the need for routers. Lightpaths have a capacity of 1 to 10 Gbit/s.

The company SURFnet used to be a subsidiary of the not-for-profit foundation, SURF (Samenwerkende Universitaire Reken Faciliteiten; English: Co-operative University Computing Facilities). The operating companies SURFnet, SURFmarket, and SURFsara were merged in 2020 into a single organization: SURF - a single operating company as part of the SURF Cooperative in which the members are represented.

== Services ==
Currently SURF is operating SURFnet8.

SURF presently provides services on all network layers, including authentication services, such as eduroam, SURFconext and SURF Research Access Management. SURF also provides services for security (SURFsoc), online collaboration (SURFdrive) and streaming media. The company collaborates with a number of organization, both nationally and internationally, including the pan-European research network GÉANT (formerly DANTE and TERENA), Kennisnet and GLORIAD.

== Influence ==
SURF's executives have been founders of or occupied board positions in organisations including Ebone, CENTR, SIDN, AMS-IX, TERENA, DANTE, RIPE NCC, ISOC, IETF, IESG and IAB.

Surfnet became a driving force behind ICT-based innovation in higher education a research in the Netherlands.

== See also ==
- BELNET
- Deutsches Forschungsnetz
- EUnet
- GÉANT
- Internet2
