= Irish Centre for High-End Computing =

National high-performance computing centre in Ireland

ICHEC
- Established: 2005
- Field of research: High performance computing, Hardware acceleration, Computational science and engineering
- Director: Prof. Jean-Christophe ("JC") Desplat
- Chairperson: Martin Hynes
- Staff: 41
- Address: Technology & Enterprise Campus, Grand Canal Quay, Dublin 2
- Location: Dublin and Galway, Ireland
- ZIP code: D02 HP83
- Operating agency: University of Galway
- Website: www.ichec.ie

The Irish Centre for High-End Computing (ICHEC) is the national high-performance computing centre in Ireland. It was established in 2005 and provides supercomputing resources, support, training and related services. ICHEC is involved in education and training, including providing courses for researchers.

== Kay supercomputer ==
ICHEC's newest supercomputer, Kay, was commissioned in August 2018 and was named after Irish-American ENIAC programmer Kathleen Antonelli following a public poll, in which the other shortlist candidates were botanist Ellen Hutchins, scientist and inventor Nicholas Callan, geologist Richard Kirwan, chemist Eva Philbin, and hydrographer Francis Beaufort. Kay's system is composed of:

- A cluster of 336 nodes, each node having 2x 20-core 2.4 GHz Intel Xeon Gold 6148 (Skylake) processors, 192 GiB of RAM, a 400 GiB local SSD for scratch space and a 100Gbit OmniPath network adaptor. This partition has a total of 13,440 cores and 63 TiB of distributed memory.
- A GPU partition of 16 nodes with the same specification as above, plus 2x Nvidia Tesla V100 16GB PCIe (Volta architecture) GPUs on each node. Each GPU has 5,120 CUDA cores and 640 Tensor Cores.
- A "Phi" partition of 16 nodes, each containing 1x self-hosted Intel Xeon Phi Processor 7210 (Knights Landing or KNL architecture) with 64 cores @ 1.3 GHz, 192 GiB RAM and a 400 GiB local SSD for scratch space.
- A "high memory" set of 6 nodes each containing 1.5 TiB of RAM, 2x 20-core 2.4 GHz Intel Xeon Gold 6148 (Skylake) processors and 1 TiB of dedicated local SSD for scratch storage.
- A set of service and administrative nodes to provide user login, batch scheduling, management, networking, etc. Storage is provided via Lustre filesystems on a high-performance DDN SFA14k system with 1 PiB of capacity.

Like all previous HPC systems, ICHEC is connected to the HEAnet and GÉANT networks.

== Fionn supercomputer ==
Between 2014 and August 2018, ICHEC managed the Fionn supercomputer, a heterogeneous system composed of:

- an SGI ICE X cluster with 320 nodes or 7,680 Intel Ivy Bridge processor cores with a combined 20 TB of memory (24 cores and 64 GB memory per node).
- a hybrid partition with 32 nodes. Each node has 20 Intel Ivy Bridge processor cores, 64 GB of memory along with many-core hardware from Intel (2x Xeon Phi 5110P coprocessors on 16 nodes) and Nvidia (2× Tesla K20X GPGPU cards on 16 nodes).
- a shared memory compute node (14 internal NUMA nodes) with 112 Intel Sandy Bridge processor cores, 2 Intel Xeon Phi 5110P coprocessors and 1.7 TB of memory.
- a set of service and administrative nodes to provide user login, batch scheduling, management, tape backup, switches, etc. Storage is provided via a DDN SFA12k-20 platform with 560 TB of capacity to all components of the machine via a Lustre filesystem.

Fionn was connected to HEAnet's networking infrastructure. Irish researchers were able to apply for access to Fionn via several schemes. A helpdesk was available for user support. Fionn was replaced by Kay in August 2018.

== Other ICHEC functions ==
ICHEC was designated a Nvidia CUDA Research Center in 2010 Its work in this area has included the porting to CUDA of the Quantum ESPRESSO and DL_POLY molecular dynamics packages as well as various industrial benchmarking studies.

ICHEC became an Intel Parallel Computing Center (IPCC) in 2014 to conduct research on many-core technology in high performance computing and big data analytics.

In collaboration with Met Éireann, ICHEC provides hardware and support to publish climate and weather forecast models. ICHEC computational scientists also take an active part in the ongoing development of the models and conduct related climate/environmental research.

ICHEC works with a number of Irish government departments and agencies (e.g. Enterprise Ireland, IDA Ireland) to provide consultancy services to Irish companies in various areas including data mining, visualisation, data management and software development/optimization.
