= ICHEC =

ICHEC may refer to:

- ICHEC Brussels Management School
- Irish Centre for High-End Computing
