= Uninet =

Uninet or variants may refer to:

- UniNet, the Thailand Education and Research Network
- Uninet, a former brand of Telmex, a Mexican telecommunications company
- UNINET, an early facility for Internet in South Africa

== See also ==
- Uninett, a Norwegian internet company
