= Inter-University Computing & Innovation Center =

The Inter-University Computing & Innovation Center (IUCC), implements, operates and maintains the national research and education network (NREN) of Israel.

IUCC (Hebrew: מחב”א, MACHBA), was established in 1984 by Israel’s research universities and supported by the Planning and Budgeting Committee of the Council for Higher Education. It operates as a non-profit organization. Through its centers and divisions, IUCC delivers communication and network infrastructure services, digital information services, and learning technologies, as well as operating and handling all inter-university joint procurement and the legal aspects of operating Israel’s National Research and Education Network (NREN). IUCC promotes cooperation in these areas among member institutions, and between research institutes and organizations.

== Network ==
=== History ===
IUCC's telecommunications infrastructure was created in 1984 with a pre-Internet 9.6 kbit/s international line to the European EARN network. In 1990, the first international Internet line from Israel to the USA began operating, at a rate of 64 kbit/s.

For a period of three years (1994-1996), IUCC operated a central node for Internet access for high-tech companies in Israel, as well as for various telecommunications providers (prior to the establishment of the Israeli Internet Society's central peering node known as the IIX). In 1997, the responsibility for commercial domestic internet traffic routing via the Israeli Internet eXchange (IIX) was transferred to the Israel Internet Association (ISOC-IL), and in 1999 IUCC was connected to the Internet2 network in the USA and to the European research network GÉANT.

=== Network ===
The Israeli university telecommunications infrastructure is based on a dual-star, eight-node network known as the ILAN-2 network. Interconnecting the network's two central points of presence (POPs), one located at Tel Aviv University and the other at a neutral colocation site called Med-1, is a dark fiber link operating at 20 Gbit/s. Each of the eight Israeli universities in the consortium connects to both POPS via a primary 10-20 Gbit/s and a 2 Gbit/s backup link. These links are provided by Cellcom (primary) and HOT (failover). Automatic failover of these links is handled by the Open Shortest Path First routing protocol.

The IUCC network is connected abroad via two 30 Gbit/s links, one which runs from the Med-1 site in Petach Tikva and terminates in Frankfurt, Germany and the other from Tel Aviv University to London, UK. These links connect IUCC to the GÉANT network in Europe and through it also to the American research network - Internet2 and the wider internet. Additionally, the IUCC connects to the Israeli domestic internet using a 10 Gigabit Ethernet link to the IIX, as well as maintaining smaller dedicated links to about a dozen selected educational and research institutions in the country.

== Collaboration ==
IUCC collaborates with a number of organisations, both nationally and internationally:

- GÉANT
- euroHPC
