= Zimani Kadzamira =

Malawian academic (1941–2026)

Zimani David Kadzamira (1 July 1941 – 18 September 2026) was a Malawian academic, civil servant and diplomat. He was the Vice-Chancellor of the University of Malawi until 2009.

== Early life and education ==
Kadzamira was born in Salisbury, Southern Rhodesia (now Harare, Zimbabwe) on 1 July 1941. He attended primary school there before returning to Nyasaland (now Malawi) for secondary school. He then moved to the United States, where he graduated from Princeton University with a degree in political science in 1966. He graduated from the University of Manchester in 1974 with a doctorate in government.

== Academia ==
Kadzamira had worked with the University of Malawi in some respect since 1966. Since joining as an assistant lecturer, he had worked as a full professor and eventually as administrator. He was Vice-Chancellor of the University of Malawi until 30 November 2009 when Dr. Emmanuel Fabiano was appointed the eighth Vice Chancellor.

== Public service ==
Kadzamira served Malawi internationally a number of times over his career. He served on the committee for the Supreme Council for Sports in Africa for Zone VII (1987–1992), the WorldFish Center (1990–1995) and as ambassador to Japan from 1992–1994. In February 2007, he was appointed chairman of the UbuntuNet Alliance, which advocates for high-speed Internet connectivity for National Research and Education Networks (NRENs) connecting research and education institutions across Africa. He also served as the first Malawian Ambassador to Japan.

== Personal life and death ==
One of his sisters, Cecilia Kadzamira, served as official hostess to President Hastings Banda. His sister Mary Kadzamira, who died in 2019, served as private secretary to Banda.

Kadzamira died in Blantyre, Malawi on 18 September 2026, at the age of 85.
