= TTRENT =

Trinidad and Tobago NREN (TTRENT) is a national research and education network in Trinidad and Tobago.
