= AMRES =

Akademska mreža Srbije
- Abbreviation: AMRES
- Formation: April 2010
- Legal status: Government institution
- Headquarters: Belgrade, Serbia
- Region served: Serbia
- Director: dr Miloš Cvetanović
- Main organ: Managing Board
- Website: www.amres.ac.rs/en

AMRES (Akademska mreža Srbije) is the National Research and Education Networking organisation (NREN) in Serbia. After it was founded on 22 April 2010 as an institution by the Serbian government, AMRES took over the responsibility for the academic network and the associated services from the Computer Centre of the University of Belgrade. AMRES represents Serbia in international forums such as TERENA, but the University of Belgrade is still the organisation representing Serbia in the project that provides the funding for the European backbone network GÉANT.

== History ==
The development of the national research network in Serbia started in the early 1990s, when the Computer Centre of the University of Belgrade (RCUB) provided network connections between several faculties of the university. In 1996 RCUB connected the academic network to the Internet via the network provider BeoTel Net. By the end of the 1990s connections with a speed of 2 Mbit/s were set up with the universities in Novi Sad, Niš and Kragujevac, but at that time the majority of institutions still had modem connections based on leased phone lines.

The beginning of the new millennium marked the end of a period of stagnation and the start of a time of rapid development and international cooperation. Because AMRES was not a legal entity at that time, the federal government entrusted the management and operations of the national research network to the University of Belgrade. Close collaboration grew with the Greek sister organisation GRNET, which resulted in international connectivity for research traffic at 34 Mbit/s, complemented by an even higher capacity connection to the commodity Internet by 2002.

Nationally, the first optical connections at Gigabit speed were introduced in 2002. In 2003, an agreement on the lease of optical fibre for the majority of connections throughout Serbia was signed between Telekom Srbija, the University of Belgrade and the Ministry of Science, Technology and Development. This laid the basis for the construction of the GigaAMRES network.

On 19 May 2011, the Government of the Republic of Serbia adopted a bill on the Statute of the Information-communication institution AMRES - “Academic network of Serbia”. On 18 November 2010, the government had already appointed Prof. Zoran Jovanović as the first Director of AMRES, and had named the President and members of the Managing Board and the supervisory board.

The maintenance of the AMRES network and the provision of AMRES services is organised through the four AMRES service centres. They are located at the Computer Centre of the University of Belgrade, the Centre for Information Technology of the University of Novi Sad, the Unified University Educational Scientific Information System of the University of Niš and the Computing Centre of the University of Kragujevac.

== The AMRES network ==
The AMRES network infrastructure consists of three components. The access network connections institutes to the AMRES points of presence (PoPs), which are managed and controlled by the AMRES service centres. The backbone network interconnects the AMRES PoPs, which are located in the service centres in Belgrade, Novi Sad, Niš and Kragujevac, and in Subotica, Sombor, Zrenjanin, Šabac, Pančevo, Valjevo, Užice, Čačak, Kraljevo, Kruševac, Leskovac, Vranje, Bor, Pirot, Novi Pazar and Kosovska Mitrovica. Finally, there are external links to national research networks in other countries, commercial Internet service providers and partner institutes.

Optical technology is used for traffic on the dark-fibre infrastructure, in particular Gigabit Ethernet (1000BASE-X), as well as satellite modules and single-mode or multi-mode cables. xDSL VPN technology used for the access network, in cooperation with Telekom Srbija. Analogue lines are still used in some places for accessing the network, although this technology poses problems because of the lack of stability of the functional services.

== Services ==
AMRES offers a domain name registration service, an Authentication and authorization infrastructure, and multicast. It provides digital certificates through the TERENA Certificate Service. Services offered by the AMRES service centres to end users include a helpdesk, DNS, proxy servers, email services, remote access, web hosting and monitoring.
