= GLORIAD =

GLORIAD (Global Ring Network for Advanced Application Development) is a high-speed computer network used to connect scientific organizations in Russia, China, United States, the Netherlands, Korea and Canada. India, Singapore, Vietnam, and Egypt were added in 2009.

GLORIAD is sponsored by the US National Science Foundation, a consortium of science organizations and Ministries in Russia, the Chinese Academy of Sciences, the Ministry of Science and Technology of Korea, the Canadian CANARIE network, the national research network in The Netherlands SURFnet and has some telecommunications services donated by Tyco Telecommunications.

GLORIAD provides bandwidth of up to 10 Gbit/s via OC-192 links, e.g. between KRLight in Korea and the Pacific NorthWest GigaPOP in the United States.

The previous version of the network, "Little GLORIAD", was completed in mid-2004, and it connected Chicago, Hong Kong, Beijing, Novosibirsk, Moscow, Amsterdam and Chicago again. For this network, a direct computer link was drawn between Russia and China for the first time in history.
