= Lise Fuhr =

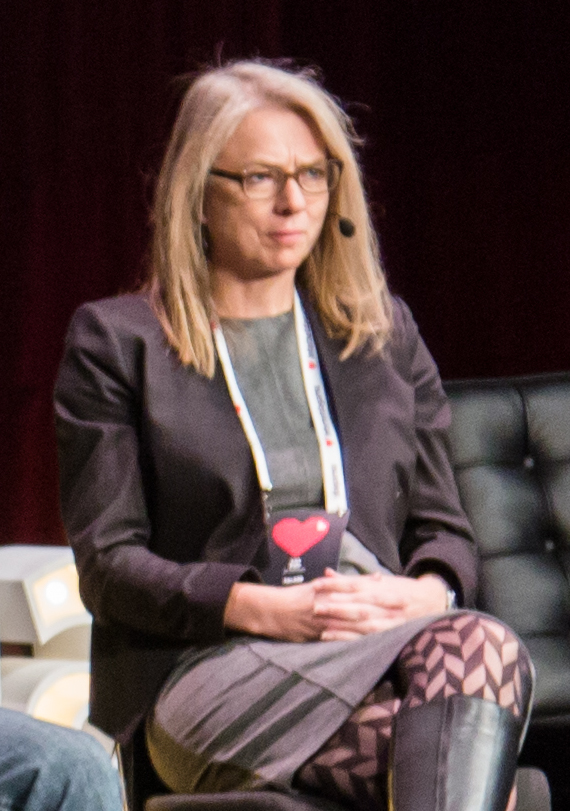
- Lise Fuhr in 2015
- Occupation: businessperson
- Known for: CEO at GÉANT

Lise Fuhr is a Danish businessperson, CEO of the Gigabit European Academic Network (GÉANT), the pan-European data network for the research and education community. She has developed her career in technology, internet and telecoms-related organisations and industries.

During the 2010s, she was Chief Operating Officer at the company managing .dk domain names. In 2015 she was appointed Director General of ETNO, an association based in Brussels with the goal of representing Europe's leading telecom operators. During the 2022–2025 term is a member of the United Nations Internet Governance Forum Leadership Panel. In November 2024 she was appointed CEO of GÉANT, the Gigabit European Academic Network.

She is a member of the Danish Academy of Technical Sciences (Akademiet for de Tekniske Videnskabe). She has also been Chair of the Danish Cyber security organisation “Security Tech Space”, and Chairwoman of Public Interest Registry (.org domain name registry) and the Public Technical Identifiers (PTI), formerly IANA, and affiliate of ICANN.
