= KENET =

KENET, Kenya Education Network, is Kenya's National research and education network (NREN). KENET is licensed by the Communications Authority of Kenya (CA) as a not-for-profit operator serving the education and research institutions.
