= Netskope =

American cybersecurity company

- Type: Public
- Traded as: Nasdaq: NTSK
- Industry: Cybersecurity, network security, cloud computing
- Founded: May 2012
- Headquarters: Santa Clara, California
- Key people: Sanjay Beri (co-founder, CEO), Krishna Narayanaswamy (co-founder, CTO), Drew Del Matto (CFO), Raphael Bousquet (CRO)
- Revenue: ▲US$709 million (2025)
- Net income: ▼ −US$679 million (2025)
- Website: netskope.com

Netskope, Inc. is a cybersecurity company headquartered in Santa Clara, California, United States. Established in 2012, the company offers security and networking for cloud and AI. Netskope is publicly listed on the Nasdaq under the ticker symbol NTSK.

== History ==
Netskope was founded in May 2012 by Sanjay Beri and Krishna Narayanaswamy.

== IPO and public status ==
In August 2025, Netskope filed for an initial public offering (IPO) with the U.S. Securities and Exchange Commission, disclosing annual recurring revenue (ARR) of $707 million as of the end of July 2025, representing 33% year-over-year growth.

At IPO, the company priced 47.8 million shares at $19 per share, raising $908.2 million.
