= RedIRIS =

National research and education network for Spain

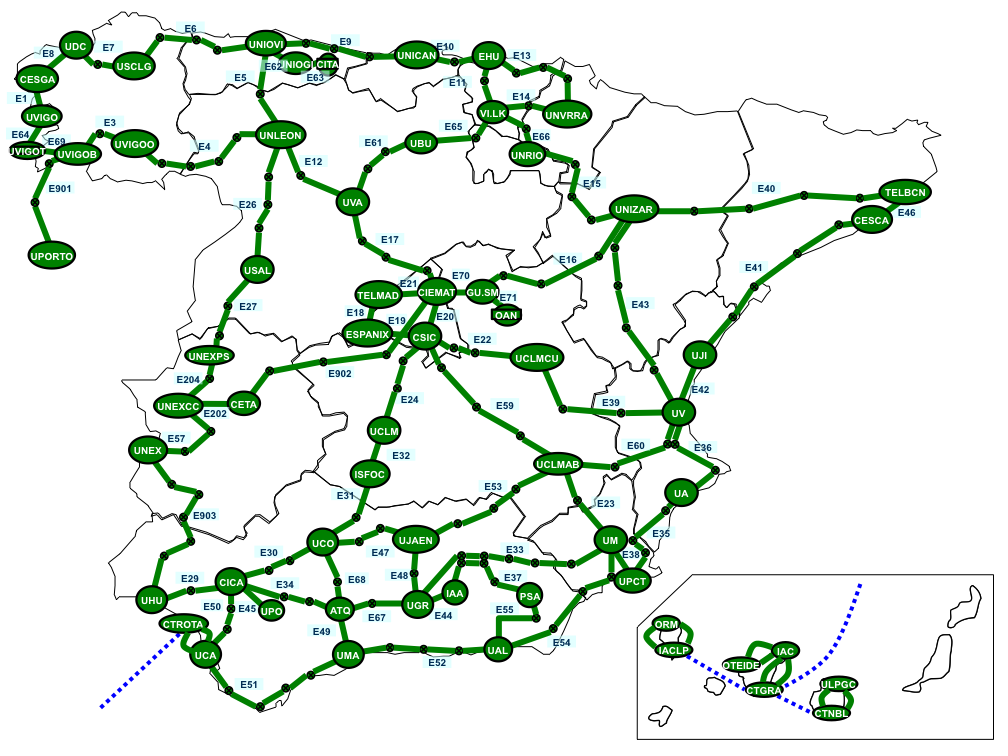

RedIRIS is the national research and education network (NREN) for Spain. It is part of Red.es, which also administers and oversees the .es national Top-level domain. Most Spanish universities and research centers are interconnected through RedIRIS, currently totalling about 260 institutions. RedIRIS also acts as an Internet service provider for affiliated institutions, through links with Cogent Communications and Level 3 Communications. As a national NREN, RedIRIS is connected to the high-speed European GÉANT backbone, similar to the US-based Abilene Network.

Other services provided by RedIRIS include a collection of FTP mirrors, customized software for affiliated institutions, interconnection with the Eduroam European wireless network, LISTSERV service, BlackList IP Service for relays, and an incident response team, IRIS-CERT.

== See also ==
- GÉANT
- TERENA
- Eduroam
