= OSHEAN =

US research and education network

OSHEAN Inc.
- Type: Non-Profit
- Industry: K-12 Education, Higher Education, Government, NonProfit, Internet2
- Founded: 1999, Rhode Island
- Headquarters: Warwick, RI
- Key people: David Marble (President and CEO); Chip Tolbert (Chief Operations Officer); Tim Rue (Chief Technology Officer)
- Number of employees: 20 (2018)
- Website: www.oshean.org

The Ocean State Higher Education Economic Development and Administrative Network (OSHEAN, pronounced "ocean") is a non-profit coalition of colleges, universities, K-12 school, libraries, hospitals, government agencies and other non-profit organizations, providing Internet-based technology for its member institutions and the communities they serve. OSHEAN is a member of the Rhode Island technology community, regularly contributing expertise and resources to a wide range of initiatives, from school enrichment activities to community forums on technology-related issues in the public interest. OSHEAN regularly pursues opportunities for local, regional and national collaboration and plays a national leadership role in professional education for IT professionals and policy development in the information technology arena.

OSHEAN is building a communications infrastructure for Rhode Island's institutions of higher education, state and federal government agencies, non-profit research organizations, workforce development initiatives, and economic development efforts.

== History ==
OSHEAN, Inc. is a consortium of non-profit organizations tasked with the creation of an Internet communications network. The organization collaboratively delivers and maintains a secure communications infrastructure for Rhode Island's research, education, health care and public service communities. OSHEAN was founded in 1999 through a collaboration by RINET (Rhode Island Network for Educational Technology – K-12), the University of Rhode Island and Brown University. The consortium of non-profit organizations, now totaling 28, was originally formed to bring an Internet2 point-of-presence to Rhode Island.

Initially several institutions of higher education in Rhode Island formed the OSHEAN membership. In September 2001 the consortium expanded into the health care community after Lifespan became OSHEAN's 11th member. OSHEAN further branched out to state government in October 2005 when the Rhode Island Department of Administration, now the RI Division of Information Technology, joined the consortium. OSHEAN reached beyond the borders of Rhode Island for the first time in 2002 to welcome Wheaton College as its 13th member. In 2012, OSHEAN fully merged with RINET (Rhode Island Network for Educational Technology) and began to directly service pK-12 and libraries across Rhode Island.

In 2021, OSHEAN completed an upgrade of their Layer 2 network architecture to enable 100G backbone connections, EVPN, and segment routing. Today, OSHEAN delivers an Internet-based communication infrastructure consisting of network, cloud, and security services. Technologies include ultra-broadband access to the Internet and Internet2, managed firewall, business continuity planning, disaster recovery, emergency preparedness, Cisco Umbrella, vulnerability assessment, SD-WAN, web content filtering, VoIP, and private cloud connections to most major providers.
