= Connecticut Education Network =

The Connecticut Education Network (CEN) is a statewide, high-speed fiber-optic network serving the research and education community in Connecticut. Established in 2000, it was the first all-optical research and education network in the United States. CEN provides internet access, security services, and data transport to K–12 schools, higher education institutions, libraries, and municipal governments.

== History ==
CEN was created under Connecticut General Statute §4d-82a and signed into law in 2000. The initiative was championed by then-Lieutenant Governor Jodi Rell with the goal of ensuring that all students in Connecticut were "cyber-ready" by the sixth grade. By 2005, CEN had successfully connected every public school district in the state to its fiber-optic backbone.

Initially restricted to the education and research community, the network transitioned to an "Open Access" model following the federal Broadband Technology Opportunity Program (BTOP) grant in the early 2010s. This allowed a wider range of organizations, including non-profits and state agencies, to utilize the network.

== Governance and Operation ==
CEN is a joint venture between the State of Connecticut and the University of Connecticut (UConn).

* Operator: UConn serves as the program operator, managing the network's technical infrastructure and day-to-day operations.

* Policy: The network is governed by the Connecticut Commission for Educational Technology (CET), which sets the policy goals and strategic direction for the state’s educational technology initiatives.

* Partnerships: CEN is a member of The Quilt (a national coalition of advanced regional networks) and provides access to Internet2, a high-speed nationwide network for the research community.

== Infrastructure and Services ==
The network consists of over 2,400 route miles of fiber-optic cable. It operates on a not-for-profit, cost-recovery model, allowing it to provide services at competitive rates compared to commercial internet service providers. Key services include:

* High-Speed Internet: Low-latency connectivity with "unlimited bursting" to accommodate high-traffic periods like online testing.

* Cybersecurity: Managed firewalls, DDoS (Distributed Denial of Service) protection, and web filtering.

* Community Wi-Fi: Through programs like "Everybody Learns," CEN provides public Wi-Fi and supports eduroam, a global roaming access service for the research and education community.
