= UZSCINET =

Uzbek national research laboratory

UZSCINET (Uzbekistan Scientific Network) is a national research laboratory in Uzbekistan.
