= Libraries and the US National Research and Education Network =

Technological infrastructure

Libraries operate as part of the technological infrastructure that supports the National Research and Education Network (NREN), acting as an electronic safety net for the American public to guarantee basic access to electronic information. Public libraries are in particular capable to take on this role, as they already serve such a role in a print-based society. They not only provide electronic information and network connectivity but also provide training and education to the public on how to access and use network information.

One of the most profound consequences of the NREN for librarians, library users, and the general education and research community is the “virtual library”. Consortia of public libraries use the NREN to connect their online catalogs. This cooperation enables the “universal borrowing card” subsequently allowing library users to move between public libraries as just one.

Extensive lobbying by the American Library Association (ALA) helped to add language referring to libraries to the NREN bill.

== History of NREN ==
The National Research and Education Program often referred to by the terms “National Information Highway”, “National Information Infrastructure”, Information Superhighway”, “High-Performance and high-speed network”, and “Gigabit test bed”, is a program to support improvements and enhancements to the existing Internet. The National Research and Education Network have been under discussion since 1987 and was proposed in 1969 as an experiment under the sponsorship of the United States Advanced Research Projects Agency (ARPA), an agency of the Department of Defense. The NREN was officially established with the passage of the High Performance Computing Act signed into law by President Bush on December 9, 1991.

- Purpose

The main purpose and fundamental emphasis is to maintain the United States leading place in high-performance or high-speed computing. The NREN is intended to be a gigabit network that is able to move one billion bits (binary digits) of data per second, or the equivalent of 30,000 pages of text. The intention was to connect a moderate number of diverse and geographically dispersed computers with the intention of acquiring experience in techniques for offering remote login access from one computer to another through a series of intermediate computers. The initial practical application, even though not originally planned, was the electronic mail.

- Objectives

1.Establish a gigabit network for the research and education community and foster its use.

2.Develop advanced networking technologies and accelerate their development.

3.Stimulate the availability, at a reasonable cost, of the required services from the private sector.

4.Catalyze the rapid deployment of a high speed general purpose digital communications infrastructure for the nation.

- Prototypes of the NREN

1.ARPANET

Founded in 1969 by the Defense Advanced Research Projects Agency (DARPA) of the Department of Defense.

2.MILNET

The military section of the ARPANET, turned into a separate network on 1983.

3.BITNET

An academic network founded in 1980.

4.NSFNET

The National Science Foundation Network, established in 1985, known as the domestic “spinal column” of the Internet and often called the “interim NREN”.
