= Cyprus Internet Exchange =

Internet exchange point in Cyprus

- Full name: Cyprus Internet Exchange
- Abbreviation: CyIX
- Founded: 1999
- Location: Cyprus
- Website: Official website

The Cyprus Internet Exchange (CyIX) is an Internet exchange point that was created in 1999 by the Cyprus Institute of Technology and three founding members Cytanet, LogosNet and CyLink (now part of PrimeTel). CyIX has been hosted in CYNET (Cyprus Research and Education Network) premises for over a decade. CYNET is the NREN (National Research & Education Network) of Cyprus.

== See also ==
- List of Internet exchange points
