= SigmaNet =

SigmaNet is the Academic Network Laboratory of the University of Latvia Institute of Mathematics and Computer Science. It is also the Latvian NREN (National Research and Education Network), providing Internet services for the academic community in Latvia, including connectivity to the European network GÉANT, hosting, e-mail, data centre services, and grid resources.

== History and re-organization ==
The Laboratory began operation in 1992 when it was known as LATNET. In 2006 the LATNET CERT team was established, dealing with computer security incidents mostly in the Latvian academic network.

In 2008 due to internal changes, the Latvian NREN was renamed to SigmaNet, but the CERT team was moved under the Network Solutions department (NIC) and placed in the country top level domain .lv registry. The name of the CERT team was changed to CERT NIC.LV. The constituency of the team was widened to include not only the academic network, but also other constituencies that have concluded cooperation agreement on incident response services.

== Main activities ==
Research is one of the main SigmaNet’s activities. SigmaNet is participating actively in various European Commission, Structural funds and community funded projects. SigmaNet’s goal is to become the leading institution for implementation of research projects in the areas of computer network design and applications.

SigmaNet is also very active in various research projects (BalticGrid-II, GÉANT2, etc.) and task forces (TF-Storage, TF-CSIRT) related to network technologies and services, security, inclusiveness and other areas. It has been dealing with security related problems since 1992 when first activities in networking started.

SigmaNet is also one of the largest hosting companies in Latvia that offers e-mail services, web hosting, server collocation, Ultra DSL internet connection, virtual private server hosting, data storage and related services.
