= MREN =

MREN (Montenegrin Research and Education Network) is a collection of all networking services and facilities that support the information and communication requirements of the education and research community in Montenegro. Sole purpose of MREN is to create, promote, offer, participate in and preserve the requisite bases for use of modern information and communication technologies in the education and research community in Montenegro. One of the main missions of the MREN is connecting Academic Network to GÉANT, and support substantial use of the Pan-European and world research networks by Montenegrin researchers, scientists, lecturers and students. Beside GÉANT, MREN is involved in other key European projects: SEERA-EI, EGI-InSPIRE and HP-SEE. Completed projects in which MREN participated were: SEE-GRID-SCI, SEEREN and SEE-GRID. MREN has clear objectives in fulfilling its purpose of supporting ICT in education and research community, and that involves:

- Create and maintain of Internet portals for idea and information exchange among the users of the research networks, as well as between broad social groups that use the new information and communication technologies;
- Support and participation in projects and initiatives for the development of the information technologies in Montenegro and abroad;
- Organization of information workshops and trainings for different social groups, including distance learning;
- Supporting the education and qualification students and specialists, working in the field of the information technologies;
- Technological, administrative and financial optimization of the connections of Montenegrin organizations and persons of the scientific and information areas to the research networks;
- Provision of support to schools and educational institutions that offer ICT training;
- Organization of educational seminars, conferences, symposiums, exhibitions and other public events dedicated on the promotion of advanced information technologies and multimedia information services;
- Consulting on technological solutions on ICT Projects, as well as participation in national and international initiatives aiming at the ICT development in the European countries.

According to defined objectives, MREN has several activities in fulfilling those objectives, and those are:

- Representation of Montenegro in the field of research networks
- Promotion of e-business practices and technologies.
- Management of the National Research and Educational Network
- Planning, designing and implementation of technological and developmental projects with emphasis in Research Networking and Grid areas

For technical management and monitoring of the National Research and Educational Network, The Information Technology Centre (CIS) of University of Montenegro (UoM) is responsible, while for professional and administrative activities according to MREN demands is responsible Ministry of Science.
