= ASNET-AM =

Academic Scientific Research Computer Network of Armenia
- Abbreviation: ASNET-AM
- Formation: 1994
- Purpose: To unify Academic, Scientific, Research, Educational, Cultural and other organizations in Armenia, promote and participate in the development of a high-quality information and telecommunications infrastructure for the benefit of scientific research and education.
- Location: Yerevan, Armenia,
- Region served: Armenia
- Website: asnet.am

The Academic Scientific Research Computer Network of Armenia (ASNET-AM) is the national research and education network (NREN) of Armenia. ASNET-AM was created in 1994. The structure and policy of ASNET-AM operation was developed and realized by the Institute for Informatics and Automation Problems ([ IIAP ]) of the National Academy of Sciences of Armenia.

== Activity ==
Main trends of ASNET-AM activity include:

- Scientific Research
- Database development and processing in various fields of science, technology, art
- Participation and support of scientific, educational, technical, cultural and other programs and projects
- IT Training and Education

Starting from 1997 biennial International Conference on Computer Science and Information Technologies (CSIT) is organized with the support of ASNET-AM.

== Network Services ==
ASNET-AM services include:

- Permanent (wired & wireless) multiprotocol connectivity
- IPv4 & IPv6 (dual-stack) routing
- Managed and guarantied bandwidth (QoS)
- Network access via Proxy server
- Access to ArmCluster & ArmGrid
- Domain Name Service (DNS)
- E-Mail services (SMTP, POP, IMAP), Webmail, Mailing Lists
- Internet accessible Information and Database Systems
- Secure Data Transmission (VPN, VTUN, EoIP, IP-IP, VLAN, IPVLAN)
- Tele-education and Tele-conferencing, Virtual Desktop
- Dial-in
- Mail Informer service & WebSMS service
- Network monitoring (Nfsen, Nagios, Cacti, Weathermap, Ntop, Dude)
- Web Hosting (HTTP, HTTPS)
- Server/Router installation and maintenance
- Archive Backup
- Antivirus, Antispam, Antispyware support
- User Support & Consulting
- IT Training & Education
- Media streaming (Video/Audion Webcast)
- Mobile broadband 3G access
- Eduroam.am service

== Networking ==
ASNET-AM develops and provides advanced network services to the Academic, Research and Education communities of Armenia. The network interconnects about 60 scientific, research, educational, cultural and other organisations in 5 cities of Armenia, such as Yerevan, Ashtarak, Byurakan, Abovian, Gyumri, integrating them with the Pan-European Research and Education Network, GEANT. ASNET-AM network in Yerevan consists of dark fiber infrastructure with current link bandwidth from 100 Mbit/s to 10 Gbit/s.

== Clustering/GRID ==
ASNET-AM supported the creation of first and most powerful supercomputer center in the field of science and education in Armenia - ArmCluster established in 2004. Currently ASNET-AM serves as the foundation for advanced computing applications in Armenia and provides its infrastructure for ArmGrid [] backbone network. ASNET-AM participates in the HP-SEE, High-Performance Computing Infrastructure for South East Europe's Research Communities EU project that will link existing and upcoming HPC facilities in South East Europe in a common infrastructure, and it will provide operational solutions for it.

== International activities ==
ASNET-AM participates actively in international projects.

ASNET-AM participates in Terena Compendium.
