= Thailand Education and Research Network =

The Thailand Education and Research Network (UniNet) is the first nationwide education and research computer network in Thailand. UniNet was formed on October 8, 1996. and was funded by the Thai government. UniNet ensures the centralized management of information technology and communications. There are 3,004 network institution members (such as universities, colleges, libraries) and 3,096 nodes.
