= RHnet =

Icelandic computer network

- Industry: NREN
- Headquarters: Reykjavík, Iceland
- Area served: Iceland
- Website: www.rhnet.is

RHnet is the Icelandic Educational and Research Network. Its objective is to link together Icelandic universities and research institutions by means of a high capacity computer network, and supply services in the field of computer communications, both domestically and internationally.

RHnet is a limited company, founded with the sole aim of enhancing the level of communication within the Icelandic university and research community, and serve as its gateway to international networks.

RHnet is based on the principle of exclusive service to the institutions linked to it. Thus RHnet is only open to acknowledged Icelandic institutions of research and higher learning. No distinction is made between basic and applied science provided that the institute in question enjoys official recognition.

== History ==
In February 2000, Íslandssími bought a controlling stake in Internet in Iceland hf. Íslandssími then decided to close the two 2 Mbit/s links which had connected the University of Iceland to NORDUnet. On 16 June 2000 NORDUnet decided to seek offers for a 45 Mbit/s link for Icelandic universities and research institutions. NORDUnet made an agreement with Landsími Íslands, which connected RHNet to NORDUnet through UNI-C in Denmark on 4 October 2000 at 17:00. The decision was made to formally establish RHnet as an organization with the goal of connecting all Icelandic universities and research institutes together with a high speed link, so that they could share the connection to NORDUnet.

The Icelandic University Research Network (RHnet) was formally established on January 24, 2001.

The founders of RHnet are: The University of Iceland, Iceland University of Education, The University of Akureyri, Reykjavík University, Iceland Academy of the Arts, Agricultural University of Iceland, Bifröst School of Business, Hólar University College, The State Horticultural School, The National University Hospital, The Nordic Volcanological Institute, The Icelandic Technological Institute, The Construction Research Institute, The Agricultural Research Institute, National Energy Authority, Marine Research Institute and The Icelandic Fisheries Laboratories.
