= RoEduNet =

RoEduNet is a Romanian educational and research network NREN, member of the European research and education network GÉANT. The network is under the administration of the Administration Agency of the National Network for Education and Informatics Research, AARNIEC (Romanian: Agenția de Administrare a Rețelei Naționale de Informatică pentru Educație și Cercetare).

== History ==
The RoEduNet network appeared as a consequence of an evolutionary process that started after the Romanian Revolution of 1989

=== 1990 ===
Universitatea Politehnica of Bucharest and Technische Universitat Darmstadt started a project whose aim was to develop an experimental e-mail system, and to develop a communications infrastructure connected to the international data network. The German partner donated the equipment and in October 1990 the e-mail system became operational, and the international connectivity was actually a dialup connection.

=== 1991-1992 ===
A new project was developed in collaboration with Deutsches Forschungsnetz. Its purpose was to install a communications server in Bucharest, connected to the German Scientific Network WIN using x25. At the end of 1992, a dedicated x25 line was operational between Bucharest and Germany, and other Romanian universities were also using the system for e-mail messages.

=== 1993 ===
Universitatea Politehnica implemented its first LAN in November, and it was connected to EuropaNet through a 9.6 kbit/s dedicated line, whose other end was in Düsseldorf.

=== 1996 ===
128 kbit/s line
