= HEAnet =

Irish education and research network provider

- Successor: Asiera
- Formation: 1983; incorporated in 1997
- Legal status: Company limited by guarantee
- Headquarters: Dublin
- Region served: Ireland
- Services: National education and research network; internet connectivity; ICT shared services
- Chief Executive Officer: Ronan Byrne
- Board Chair: Professor Mike Murphy
- Main organ: Board of Directors
- Website: www.heanet.ie

HEAnet is the national research and education network (NREN) of the Republic of Ireland. It provides high-speed internet connectivity and shared ICT services to schools, further education bodies, higher education institutions and research organisations in Ireland.

HEAnet was formed in 1983 as a collaborative endeavour between member institutions and was incorporated as a company limited by guarantee in 1997. In 2026, HEAnet and EduCampus announced that they had merged to form a unified organisation called Asiera, short for Advancing Services for Irish Education, Research and Academia. The merger took effect on 31 December 2025.

== Network and services ==
HEAnet's national education network connects Irish education and research users to the internet and to international research networks, including through Ireland's connection to GÉANT. HEAnet states that the network supports more than 1.3 million students and researchers and over 175,000 staff across schools, education and training boards, and higher education institutions in Ireland.

The HEAnet network is based on a national backbone using ESBT fibre and the Dublin Core Ring. The backbone consists of more than 2,500 km of fibre and interconnects all higher education institutions in Ireland, while also providing backhaul for more than 4,000 primary and post-primary schools. HEAnet describes the network as consisting of optical, IP and MPLS layers, with services delivered across one or more of these layers.

HEAnet services include network connectivity, research engagement, identity management and authentication, public procurement brokerage, cybersecurity services and user support. It also manages national education services such as eduroam in Ireland.

== Schools network ==
HEAnet supports the Schools Broadband Programme, working with the Department of Education and Oide Technology in Education. The programme provides broadband connectivity, content filtering and security services, including a centralised firewall, to schools in Ireland.

HEAnet delivers between 200 Mbps and 1 Gbps broadband connectivity to Ireland's approximately 800 post-primary schools on behalf of the Government. In 2024, HEAnet announced that it had completed the connection of high-speed internet access to more than 1,000 primary schools, exceeding an original target of 990 schools. The project provided those primary schools with a minimum connectivity level of 100 Mbps.

== History ==
HEAnet began operation in 1983 as a collaborative network between Irish higher education institutions. Its origins can be traced to a project involving the then seven Irish universities, which explored shared network and computing resources for the higher education sector. The success of this shared-services model later attracted funding from the Higher Education Authority, and HEAnet was formally incorporated in 1997 to manage and develop the service.

From 1993 to 1997, HEAnet was managed by UCD Computing Services under contract. In 1997, it became a founding member of the Internet Neutral Exchange and was incorporated as a company limited by guarantee. John Boland was appointed as HEAnet's first chief executive officer. In 1998, the network increased connectivity to 2 Mbps and delivered its first wireless connection to the Dublin Institute for Advanced Studies.

HEAnet established transatlantic connectivity to the United States and beyond in 2001, and launched its first annual conference the same year. By 2004, network connectivity had increased to 1 Gbps. In 2005, the first schools were connected under the Department of Education's Schools Broadband Programme.

The network expanded beyond the university sector during the 2000s and 2010s. In 2008, institutes of technology began a phased migration from ITnet to the HEAnet network. In 2010, HEAnet launched Edugate, a national federated access service. Between 2012 and 2014, HEAnet managed the delivery of 100 Mbps connections to every post-primary school on behalf of the Irish Government.

In 2015, EduCampus was established as a subsidiary of HEAnet to provide shared management information systems and related ICT services for the higher education sector. In 2016, HEAnet began providing a 10 Gbit/s circuit for the I-LOFAR project, Ireland's station in the Low-Frequency Array (LOFAR).

From 2016 to 2019, HEAnet carried out a network upgrade project to provide 100 Gbps capacity for higher education institutions across 216 locations in Ireland. In 2017, it announced the rollout of Ireland's first national 100 Gbps network for the education and research sector.

During the COVID-19 pandemic, HEAnet procured laptops for students and launched the eduroam Everywhere project. In 2022, the organisation reported the rollout of eduroam Wi-Fi in almost 500 new locations, and the first HEAnet client connected at 100 Gbps. In 2024, HEAnet completed the connection of more than 1,000 primary schools with enterprise-level broadband connectivity.

HEAnet and EduCampus announced their merger in 2025, and the two organisations merged into Asiera on 31 December 2025. The new name stands for Advancing Services for Irish Education, Research and Academia.

== Strategy ==
In November 2024, HEAnet launched its Strategy 2025–2030. The strategy identified five focus areas: network, security, research, sustainability and people. The strategy stated that HEAnet would continue to develop Ireland's education and research network, expand international connectivity, strengthen security services and support research infrastructure.

== Former services ==
HEAnet previously operated a software mirror service, including mirrors for open-source software projects. In 2023, HEAnet announced that several services would be decommissioned in 2024, including video conferencing services, ClassView and the Software Mirroring Service. The mirror site later displayed a notice stating that ftp.heanet.ie had stopped operations.

== Conferences ==
HEAnet has organised an annual conference for Ireland's education and research technology community. In 2014, it hosted the TERENA Networking Conference in Dublin. The 2024 HEAnet Conference programme included topics such as cybersecurity, collaboration tools, strategy, digital transformation, identity and research.

== Governance ==
Asiera is a company limited by guarantee and a registered charity with the Charities Regulatory Authority. Its board is responsible for leading and directing the organisation's activities and follows the Code of Practice for the Governance of State Bodies to the extent practicable. At the end of 2025, EduCampus was absorbed into Asiera under a merger by absorption, with all assets and liabilities transferred to Asiera as the parent company.

== See also ==
- Jisc
