= SUNET =

Swedish University Computer Network

SUNET is the Swedish University Computer Network. SUNET provides high-speed Internet access to academic institutions in Sweden. The current incarnation of the network, Sunet C, provides 100 Gbit/s links between the cities hosting universities. It replaces the older network, OptoSunet, based mainly on 10 and 40 Gbit/s links. SUNET's upstream network is the Nordic NORDUnet. SUNET is governed by a board appointed by the Swedish Research Council (Vetenskapsrådet). In addition to the board there is a technical reference group and a development group, as well as people working at the participating universities.

SUNET did operate one of Sweden's largest FTP archives, mirroring extensive useful material of 'academic' interest, similar to the UK Mirror Service hosted by the University of Kent. The service ftp.sunet.se is now hosted by Academic Computer Club at Umeå university. Before the service was down sized and control of the domain was handed over to ACC, the service could handle more than 10,000 concurrent users.

SUNET, together with Sprint and TeliaSonera, took part in a 40 Gbit/s transmission on a single wavelength between Luleå, Sweden and New York City using TAT-14.

== See also ==
- NORDUnet
- GEANT
- History of the Internet in Sweden
