= KazRENA =

Kazakhstan Research & Education Networking Association
- Abbreviation: KazRENA
- Formation: 3 August 2001
- Legal status: Association
- Headquarters: Almaty, Kazakhstan
- Region served: Kazakhstan
- Director General: Boris Japarov
- Main organ: Board
- Website: Kazrena

Kazakhstan Research & Education Networking Association (KazRENA) is a nonprofit organization established in August 2001 with the goal of resolving the digital divide problem in the Republic of Kazakhstan by developing a unified infrastructure of the research and educational computer network. KazRENA is a participant of the NATO Virtual Silk Highway Project along with representatives of Central Asian and Caucasus states. KazRENA provides Universities, Colleges, Scientific and Research Centers, Libraries, Museums, and NGOs of Kazakhstan with high-speed Internet access.
