= Danish Network for Research and Education =

The Danish Research Network, "Forskningsnettet", is a joint high-speed network for universities and the research community in Denmark.

Today, the Danish Research Network has approximately 100 subscribers and more than 100,000 users every day. The network was originally established in 1987.

The Danish Research Network is run by Danish e-Infrastructure Cooperation (DeiC). It is a virtual organization under the Danish Ministry of Science, Innovation and Higher Education. Both Universities, research institutions, other public institutions and Danish companies with a considerable element of research may subscribe to the Danish Research Network.
