= NORDUnet =

Organization

- Formation: 1985
- Type: Not-for-profit company limited by shares
- Purpose: Research and education network
- Headquarters: Kastrup, Denmark
- Website: nordu.net

NORDUnet is an international collaboration between the national research and education networks in the Nordic countries.

== Members ==
The members of NORDUnet are:

- SUNET of Sweden
- UNINETT of Norway
- FUNET of Finland
- Forskningsnettet of Denmark
- RHnet of Iceland

== Network ==
NORDUnet interconnects the Nordic national research and education networks and connects them to the worldwide network for research and education and to the general purpose Internet. NORDUnet provides its services by a combination of leased lines and Internet services provided by other international operators. NORDUnet has peering in multiple important internet exchange sites outside the Nordics, such as Amsterdam, Chicago, Frankfurt, London, Miami and New York.

In addition to the basic Internet service NORDUnet operates information services and provides USENET NetNews and Multicast connectivity to the Nordic national networks. NORDUnet also coordinates the national networks' Computer Emergency Response Team (CERT) activities and the Nordic national networks' IPv6 activities - an area where NORDUnet has been active for years.

NORDUnet is one of the members, alongside Internet2, ESnet, SURFnet, CANARIE and GÉANT, to pilot a 100G intercontinental connection between Europe and North America.

== History ==
NORDUnet is the result of the NORDUNET, Nordic University Networks, programme (1986 to 1992) financed by the Nordic Council of Ministers, officially beginning operations 1989. It was the first European NREN to embrace the TCP/IP technology and to connect to the National Science Foundation Network in the United States providing open access for university students in member countries. Along with other early adopters of TCP/IP, particularly CERN, it encouraged the adoption of TCP/IP in Europe (see Protocol Wars).

NORDUnet has only few permanent employees. Most of the work is contracted to appropriate organisations in the Nordic area.

== Distinction ==
The web site for NORDUNet, nordu.net, is the oldest active domain name. It was registered on January 1, 1985.

== See also ==
- History of the Internet
- History of the Internet in Sweden
- NORSAR – one of the two original international connections on the ARPANET
- Norwegian Defence Research Establishment – carried out early research on TCP/IP in Europe along with Peter Kerstein's group at University College London and the Royal Signals Radar Establishment in Britain
