= LITNET =

Lithuanian research and education network

LITNET is Lithuanian Research and Education Network in Lithuania. It was established in 1991 and had X.25 satellite connectivity to University of Oslo.

LITNET NOC is located in Kaunas University of Technology (KTU).
