= Turkish Academic Network and Information Center =

Turkish Academic Network and Information Center Ulusal Akademik Ağ ve Bilgi Merkezi
- Abbreviation: TÜBİTAK ULAKBİM
- Formation: 1996
- Type: GO
- Purpose: Academic information
- Headquarters: YÖK Binası B5 Blok
- Location: Bilkent, Çankaya, Ankara, Turkey
- Coordinates: 39°52′37″N 32°45′45″E
- Parent organization: Scientific and Technological Research Council of Turkey (TÜBİTAK)
- Website: www.ulakbim.gov.tr

The 'Turkish Academic Network and Information Center (Turkish: Ulusal Akademik Ağ ve Bilgi Merkezi), shortly ULAKBIM, was founded as a research and development facility institute of Scientific and Technological Research Council of Turkey (TÜBİTAK) in Bilkent, Çankaya of Ankara, Turkey in 1996.

ULAKBIM's main objectives have been set as operating a high speed computer network, enabling interaction within the institutional elements of the national innovation system, and providing information technology support and information services to help scientific production. ULAKBIM aims at providing technological facilities such as computer networks, information technology support, and information and document delivery services, to meet the information requirements of universities and research institutions, and to increase the efficiency and productivity of their end users.

Since February 1998, ULAKBIM consists of National Academic Network (Turkish: Ulusal Akademik Ağ, ULAKNET) Unit, which undertakes the task of formation and operation of research and education network infrastructure in Turkey, and Cahit Arf Information Center (Turkish: Cahit Arf Bilgi Merkezi), which provides information and document supply services nationwide. The center has issued a circular demanding the dismissal of any signatory of the a petition by the Academics for Peace who is assigned to an editorial board of a journal.
