= Rede Nacional de Ensino e Pesquisa =

Brazilian academic internet backbone organization

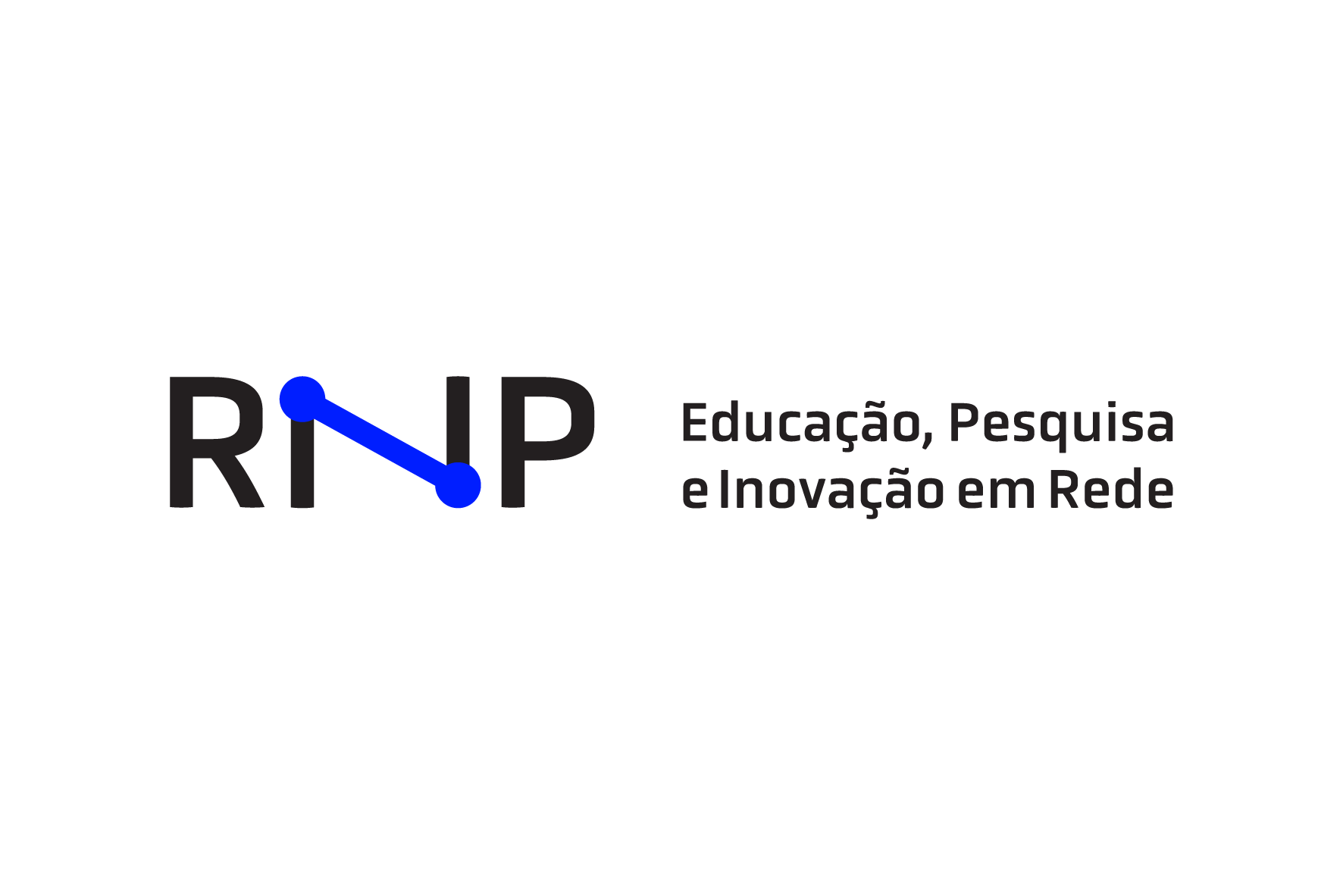
RNP Logo

Rede Nacional de Ensino e Pesquisa (RNP) (National Education and Research Network) is Brazil's academic Internet backbone. It was created in 1989 and the network started being built in 1991.

RNP has 27 points of presence, one on each of the 26 Brazilian states and on the Federal District. It connects 15 state networks and over 600 institutions.

== See also ==
- National Research and Education Network
