= HARNET =

HARNET (Hong Kong Academic and Research Network) is the wide area network that links up the campus networks of the eight tertiary institutions in Hong Kong.

It was founded in 1991 or 1992. Its goal is to facilitate information sharing among academic libraries. It is primarily operated by the University of Hong Kong.
