= CESNET =

- Formation: 1996
- Legal status: Association
- Headquarters: Prague, Czech Republic
- Region served: Czech Republic
- CEO: Jakub Papírník
- Website: www.cesnet.cz

CESNET (Czech Education and Scientific NETwork) is developer and operator of national e-infrastructure for science, research, development and education in Czech Republic. The CESNET association was founded in 1996 by Czech public universities and the Academy of Sciences of the Czech Republic. An important part of CESNET's activities is research of advanced network technologies and applications from hybrid networking, programmable hardware, metacomputing to middleware and video transmissions. CESNET fulfils the role of NREN within the Czech Republic and represents it in international organisations such as the GÉANT Association (established through a merger between TERENA and DANTE), EGI and GLIF. CESNET is involved in the implementation of the European backbone network project called GÉANT. Within the Czech Republic CESNET fulfils the role of a coordinator of large infrastructures involved in the field of information technology.

== CESNET e-Infrastructure ==
The CESNET e-infrastructure is a complex system of interconnected tools that provides a wide range of services necessary for transmission, storage and data processing. These include, for example, performance computing clusters with programs used in many areas, a large data repository used for data storage and sharing, multimedia communication tools making cooperation between distributed teams easier, and other services. These modern IT services are used for scientific and research work, and for problem solving focusing on a wide range of disciplines which are not confined to natural sciences, such as mathematics, physics, chemistry, biology and computer science, but also include, for example, humanitarian sciences and art. The extensive e-infrastructure is composed of four basic logically coherent components: • high throughput communication infrastructure with a transfer speed of 100 Gbit/s (CESNET2), • grid infrastructure suitable for high performance computing, • data storage infrastructure, • infrastructure allowing collaboration between distributed teams and end user mobility. The CESNET e-infrastructure includes institutions such as public, state and private universities, institutes of the Academy of Sciences of the Czech Republic, university hospitals, scientific and other libraries, technological and innovation centres and science parks, important cultural institutions and many other scientific and research institutions. The total number of individual users with access to the CESNET e-infrastructure in the Czech Republic is about 450 thousand persons. Thanks to a direct connection with GÉANT, the backbone network for science, research and education, and also thanks to a connection to research networks in other world regions provided by GÉANT (Internet2 and ESnet in the USA, AfricaConnect in Africa, TEIN in Asia and CLARA in the Pacific and Latin America), the CESNET e- infrastructure even allows cooperation and operation of demanding and unique applications and data sharing in the multinational and international scientific community. The CESNET e-infrastructure is included in the Czech Roadmap showing large infrastructures used for research, experimental development and innovation of the Ministry of Education, Youth and Sport of the Czech Republic.

== History ==
During the 1990s, the so-called national networks for science, research and education were established in the majority of European countries, the aim of which was to serve the specific needs of scientific and academic communities. The beginning of academic networks in the Czech Republic dates back to 1991, when a mainframe computer was installed in the computing centre of the Czech Technical University, which was then connected to the EARN (European Academic Research Network) academic network. The transfer speed was 9.6 kbit/s, and it was the first opportunity to access the global network infrastructure from the country. In 1992, the transfer speed doubled and was divided into two independent channels. One channel continued to be used for the EARN network, and the other one was used for the Internet. The Czech Republic was officially connected to the Internet on 13 February 1992. The academic community showed a huge interest in being connected to the network. Representatives of universities and institutes of the Academy of Sciences met to discuss the technical solutions for the network that would be used to connect their institutions. The result was a project called FESNET (Federal Education and Scientific NETwork), which was supported by the Department of Education. After the split of Czechoslovakia in 1993, the CESNET project was modified, and the CESNET network was put into operation at the beginning of 1993. From 1992 to 1999 CESNET supported a commercial network, but this activity was sold in early 1999 and from that time CESNET was fully focused on academic networking.

== Putting research results into practice ==
The CESNET e-infrastructure is being purposefully built according to the specific needs of the research, scientific and academic community in the Czech Republic (which differ significantly from ordinary corporate ICT support requirements). The development and gradual modernisation of the e-infrastructure is to a great extent the result of own CESNET research and development. The result of original technical solutions are several national patents, one European patent and three patents registered with the United States Department of Commerce - United States Patent and Trademark Office (USPTO). CESNET holds 18 utility models and is the author of several functional models and prototypes authorised software. CESNET, as a non-profit organisation, handled the actual transfer of research and development achievements into practice by establishing the spin-off companies INVEA-TECH a.s. and Comprimato Systems, s.r.o., and by concluding applicable licensing agreements.
