= EENet =

Estonian national research and education network

Estonian Education and Research Network (EENet) is a structural unit of the Information Technology Foundation for Education (HITSA) whose main goal is to ensure the development and stable functioning of the information technology infrastructure necessary for research, education and culture.

== Field of operation and objectives ==
EENet operates in the field of the development and administration of the information technology infrastructure of Estonian education, research and culture. EENet ensures the functioning of a data network corresponding to the specific needs of Estonian academic institutions and the development thereof in accordance with the development of technology; as well the provision of data communications and content services corresponding to the needs of research and education and promotion of the use of information technology.

== Main operations ==
- Management of the optical data network and Internet connectivity up to 10 Gbit/s
- Distributed computing resources (Estonian Scientific Computing Infrastructure, Estonian Grid)
- Webhosting, virtual environment for education (HAVIKE), virtual learning environments and educational content
- Mailboxes and mailing lists
- Domain registration (.ee, .edu.ee, .org.ee, etc.)
- Authentication and identity management (eduroam, TAAT and certificate services)
- Virtual private server; server housing
- Stratum 1 NTP server, IPv4 and IPv6 allocation

== Collaboration and projects ==
- GÉANT (project GN4) - is the 500 Gbit/s pan-European research and education network that interconnects Europe's National Research and Education Networks (NRENs). Former GÉANT projects: GN3plus (2014-2015), GN3 (2010-2013), GÉANT2 (2004–2009), GÉANT (2000–2004)
- EGI - European Grid Infrastructure
- EUMETCAST - EUMETSAT's primary dissemination mechanism for the near real-time delivery of satellite data and products
- Estonian Research and Education Optical Backbone Network (2011–2013)
- Estonian Scientific Computing Infrastructure (2011–2013)
- DC-NET - Digital Cultural heritage NETwork is an ERA-NET (European Research Area Network) project (2009–2011)
- Distributed computing projects BalticGrid (2005–2008) and BalticGrid-II (2008–2010)
- Porta Optica Study (2005-2007) - Distributed Optical Gateway to Eastern Europe
- BALTnet (1993–2001) - Networking project funded by the Nordic Council of Ministers to establish communication services in the Baltic countries
- FEMIRC Eesti (1997–1998) - EC Innovation Relay Centre in Estonia

== History ==
The Estonian Education and Research Network (EENet) was established in August 1993 by the Ministry of Education as a governmental non-profit organization. From 1997 until April 2013 EENet operated as a state agency administered by the Estonian Ministry of Education and Research.

In April, 2013 EENet was transferred to the Information Technology Foundation for Education with all current rights of representation in international organisations.

EENet managed the Estonian top level domain (.ee) and the Registry during 1993–2013.

== See also ==
- Internet in Estonia
- Communications in Estonia
