= BELNET =

Belgian Internet Provider

Belnet
- Formation: 1993
- Legal status: Public service with separate management within the Federal Public Service for Science Policy Programming (since 2000)
- Headquarters: Brussels, Belgium
- Region served: Belgium
- Chairman of the Management Committee: Pierre Bruyère
- Main organ: Management Committee
- Website: www.belnet.be

Belnet (the Belgian National research and education network) is a Belgian internet provider for educational institutions, research centres, scientific institutes and government services. Since 1993, BELNET provides web services to higher education, federal departments and ministries and international organisations.

Since 2001, Belnet provides IPv6 connectivity and multicast access to its customers.

One of Belnet's FTP servers is a mirror for holding several files related to the FOSS and GNU communities, as well as Linux distros such as Ubuntu, Debian, Gentoo, and Fedora.

Since 2004, Belnet is the operator of BEgrid, the Belgian research grid infrastructure, and since 2009 it is also the operator of the BEgrid Portal (based on P-GRADE Portal technology).

On 4 and 5 May 2021, Belnet was subject to a massive DDOS attack that disrupted the accessibility of websites using the .be domain, including those of the Belgian government, parliament, police, educational and research institutions, health care, and public broadcasters, forcing the postponement of parliamentary hearings relating to Uyghur genocide.
