= UbuntuNet Alliance for Research and Education Networking =

Organization; alliance of NRENs of East and Southern Africa

- Abbreviation: Ubuntunet
- Formation: 24 August 2006, and since 17 May 2013, Lilongwe, Malawi .
- Legal status: Association
- Purpose: Research Networking
- Headquarters: Lilongwe, Malawi
- Region served: Africa
- Chairman: Zimani Kadzamira
- Main organ: Council of Members
- Website: www.ubuntunet.net

UbuntuNet Alliance is not to be confused with Ubuntu Linux

UbuntuNet Alliance for Research and Education Networking (also known as UbuntuNet Alliance) is the regional Research and Education Network of Eastern and Southern Africa. It was founded in the later half of 2005 by established and emerging NRENs in Kenya, Malawi, Rwanda, Mozambique and South Africa with the vision of securing high speed connectivity, mainly optical fibre-based, for the research and education community - at affordable prices - that connect African NRENs to each other, to other NRENs worldwide and to the Internet generally. It was incorporated in 2006 in Amsterdam, the Netherlands, in the Trade Registrar of the Chambers of Commerce and Industry as a non-for-profit association of National Research and Education Networks (NRENs). Prior to the beginning of AfricaConnect2, in May 2013, UbuntuNet Alliance formally registered in Malawi.

Today, the UbuntuNet Alliance community includes 13 NRENs in East and Southern Africa from Sudan, Ethiopia, all the way to South Africa, covering a huge land mass of the continent.

The Alliance has a close relationship with the Association of African Universities, which appoints the Chairperson. The incumbent Chairperson is Professor Stephen Simukanga, former Vice chancellor of the University of Zambia, who was appointed in April 2019.

== Vision, Mission, and Strategic Priorities ==
The societal vision of the UbuntuNet Alliance is that of vibrant African research and education institutions, networking effectively in the global knowledge society. The mission of UbuntuNet Alliance is to ensure that African NRENs have efficient and affordable bandwidth for their member research and education institutions that enables them to participate in the global research and education networking community. The UbuntuNet Alliance aims to achieve this through strategic priorities that include the development and capacity building of NRENs in all countries in Eastern and Southern Africa; ensuring that NRENs get access to affordable high speed connectivity by lobbying for improved national policy and regulatory environments; stimulating and supporting content networks; and making the UbuntuNet Alliance financially sustainable.

UbuntuNet Alliance intends to build UbuntuNet fibre backbone network which will interconnect NRENs in Africa and connect them to the global research and education networking community through GÉANT, the European regional network.

== UbuntuNet Clusters ==
UbuntuNet Alliance adopted an opportunistic approach that seeks to build the fibre network based on the potential for broadband terrestrial connectivity that exists or is emerging in the region. Two initial backbone development clusters were defined as UbuntuNet East and UbuntuNet South. These clusters are based purely on geographic convenience, taking into account the ease of interconnection.

UbuntuNet East will interconnect NRENs in Burundi, Djibouti, DRC, Eritrea, Ethiopia, Kenya, Rwanda, Somalia, Sudan, Tanzania, and Uganda, and will connect to the global REN community through the submarine fibres landing at points along the eastern coast of Africa. UbuntuNet South will interconnect NRENs in Angola, Botswana, Lesotho, Malawi, Mozambique, Namibia, Zambia, Zimbabwe, South Africa, Swaziland, and Tanzania, and will connect to the global REN community through submarine fibres landing at points along the south-eastern, southern, and south-western coast of Africe. Ultimately, these sub-backbones will inter-connect into a seamless sub-regional research and education network.

== Membership ==
Membership to UbuntuNet Alliance is open to all bona fide African NRENs serving research and education institutions. A list of members is on UbuntuNet Alliance, website.

== Similar Organisations ==
Similar organisations elsewhere in the world include GÉANT, APAN, WACREN (West and Central African Research and Education Network), ASREN (Arab States Research and Education Network), and CLARA (Cooperación Latino Americana de Redes Avanzadas).
