= Deutsches Forschungsnetz =

German academic network

Verein zur Förderung eines Deutschen Forschungsnetzes
- Abbreviation: DFN-Verein
- Formation: 1984
- Legal status: Association
- Headquarters: Berlin, Germany
- Region served: Germany
- Chairman of the Executive Board: Stefan Wesner
- Main organ: General Assembly
- Website: www.dfn.de/en/
- ASNs: 680, 1275

Deutsches Forschungsnetz ("German Research Network"), usually abbreviated to DFN, is the German national research and education network (NREN) used for academic and research purposes. It is managed by the scientific community organized in the voluntary Association to Promote a German Education and Research Network (Verein zur Förderung eines Deutschen Forschungsnetzes e.V.) which was founded in 1984 by universities, non-university research institutions and research-oriented companies to stimulate computerized communication in Germany.

DFN's "super core" backbone X-WiN network points of presence are - for example - based in Erlangen, Frankfurt, Hannover and Potsdam with more than 70 locations and can route up to 1 TBit/s with over 10000 km of dedicated fibre connections.

Many connections to other networks such as GÉANT2 or DECIX are 100G-based and are implemented at the super core. Today connections up to 200 GBit are possible.

== Networks run by DFN e.V. ==
WiN is short for Wissenschaftsnetz ("science network").

- WiN (1989–1998)
- ERWIN (1990-1992)
- B-WiN (1996-2001)
- G-WiN (Gigabit-Wissenschaftsnetz) (2000-2005)
- X-WiN (since 2006)
