= SWITCH Information Technology Services =

Switch Foundation
- Abbreviation: Switch
- Formation: 22 October 1987 in Bern
- Legal status: Foundation
- Headquarters: Zürich, Switzerland
- Region served: Switzerland and Liechtenstein
- Managing Director: Thomas Sutter

Switch is a Swiss foundation managing the .ch and .li country-code top-level domains for Switzerland and Liechtenstein, respectively. As the Swiss national research and education network organisation, Switch also manages the educational networks among Swiss universities and research facilities, and the links to other (non Swiss) university networks.
