= TERENA =

Association of European national research and education networks

Trans-European Research and Education Networking Association
- Abbreviation: TERENA
- Formation: 13 June 1986 as Réseaux Associés pour la Recherche Européenne (RARE)
- Legal status: Association
- Purpose: To promote and participate in the development of a high-quality international information and telecommunications infrastructure for the benefit of research and education
- Headquarters: Amsterdam, Netherlands
- Region served: Europe
- President: Pierre Bruyère
- Main organ: TERENA General Assembly
- Website: www.terena.org

The Trans-European Research and Education Networking Association (TERENA, /təˈreɪnə/ tə-RAY-nə) was a not-for-profit association of European national research and education networks (NRENs) incorporated in Amsterdam, The Netherlands. The association was originally formed on 13 June 1986 as Réseaux Associés pour la Recherche Européenne (RARE) and changed its name to TERENA in October 1994. In October 2015, it again changed its name to GÉANT and at the same time acquired the shares of GEANT Limited (previously known as DANTE).

== Purpose ==
The objectives of TERENA are to promote and develop high-quality international network infrastructures to support European research and education. This includes:

- investigating, evaluating and deploying new network, middleware and application technologies;
- supporting new networking services where appropriate;
- knowledge transfer, among others in the shape of conferences, seminars and training events;
- advising governments and other authorities on networking issues;
- liaising with networking organisations in other parts of the world.

Full membership of TERENA is open to NRENs (one per member country of the ITU) and international public sector organisations. Associate membership is available for other organisations (commercial or otherwise) with an interest in research and education networking. A complete list of the current members can be found on the TERENA website.

Similar organisations elsewhere in the world include Internet2, APAN, UbuntuNet Alliance and CLARA (Cooperación Latino Americana de Redes Avanzadas). In addition, DANTE operates the pan-European research and education backbone network.

== History ==
=== RARE ===
TERENA was founded under the name Réseaux Associés pour la Recherche Européenne (RARE) on 13 June 1986. It was created by several European networking organisations to promote open computer networking standards (specifically the OSI protocols). The first few years were dominated by the Co-operation for Open Systems Interconnection Networking in Europe (COSINE) project. COSINE led to the implementation of some of the first standardised network-related services, for example X.400 email and X.500 directory service. X.25 technology was generally used for connectivity. This technology was also used in a network called IXI (International X.25 Infrastructure Backbone Service), which was the first generation of the backbone network interconnecting the national research networks in Europe, known today as GÉANT. To run the European backbone, RARE's Operational Unit was later split off from the association under the name DANTE.

Meanwhile, the need to choose between the OSI protocols and the Internet Protocol (IP) became the subject of a long-lasting controversy known as the Protocol Wars. RARE made significant contributions to the international spread of the Internet. Some RARE technical reports (RTRs) were also published as RFCs. By 1991, a project called Ebone was proposed as an interim solution while the European research networking community made the transition from OSI to IP. The Réseaux IP Européens Network Coordination Centre (RIPE NCC) was created by RARE in 1992, and was split off five years later as a separate legal entity. During the early 1990s, IP became the dominant protocol in data networking.

=== EARN ===
At the end of 1983 IBM had taken the initiative for the European Academic and Research Network (EARN), which would link selected computer centres in Europe via leased lines. It used similar technology to the BITNET in the US, and included email gateway capability. The EARN Association was set up as a legal entity in France in 1985. By 1993 it was clear that the EARN Association needed to merge with RARE, which it did on 20 October 1994. At the same time, RARE changed its name to TERENA.

== Outreach ==
TERENA publishes annual editions of the TERENA Compendium of National Research and Education Networks in Europe, which contain information about the organisation, staffing, finances, user base, capacity, services and developments of NRENs, and serve as a benchmarking tool.

TERENA supports the development of research and education networking in less advanced countries and regions in and around Europe by studying their needs and by providing advice, consultancy and training.

TERENA organises foresight studies to look into the future development of European research and education networking. These studies included SERENATE (2002-2003), EARNEST (2006-2008) and ASPIRE (2011-2012).

== Task forces and projects ==
TERENA supports joint European work in the development and testing of new networking, middleware and application technologies. It brings together specialists and engineers from TERENA member organisations and the wider research networking community. This work is organised in task forces and projects.

Task forces are groups where specialists in a certain field exchange information, discuss best practices and work together to investigate technologies for the development and deployment of services for the research and education community. Usually task forces are open for participation by any individual who can bring appropriate expertise and resources. By 2011, TERENA was supporting eight task forces: TF-CPR (communications and public relations), TF-CSIRT (collaboration of security incident response teams), TF-EMC2 (European middleware coordination and collaboration), TF-Media (media management and distribution), TF-MNM (mobility and network middleware), TF-MSP (management of service portfolios), TF-NOC (network operation centres) and TF-Storage (storage and cloud services).

TERENA projects are carried out by experts and engineers on the basis of a contract with TERENA. This requires funding from TERENA members and/or other interested organisations, possibly combined with a contribution from TERENA's own resources. A current example is REFEDS (Research and Education Federations).

In addition, the TERENA Secretariat staff participates in projects that are co-funded by the European Union, for example, the project that also provides EU funding for the GÉANT network.

== Services ==
A number of services have been established as spin-offs of the work in the TERENA task forces and projects. eduroam provides researchers, teachers and students easy and secure network access when visiting other institutions than their own; the global governance of eduroam is under the auspices of TERENA. The TERENA Certificate Service provides digital certificates that are recognised by the major browsers and devices to the user communities of participating NRENs in a cost-effective manner. The TERENA Academic Certification Authority Repository (TACAR) is a trusted online store of trust anchor certificates, related certificate policies and certificate practice statements registered by the Certification Authorities of organisations in the academic community. The eduGAIN service allows Authentication and Authorisation Infrastructures to interact, enabling the sharing of data between federations and providing an interconnection framework to applications willing to provide their services, content or resources to multiple federations. NRENum.net provides an ENUM service for academia. TERENA's Trusted Introducer service offers an accreditation and certification scheme for Computer Security Incident Response Teams (CSIRTs).

== Conference ==
TERENA runs an annual conference for academic networkers called the TERENA Networking Conference. Usually held in late May or early June, the conference is hosted by a member NREN and attended by around 500 delegates from academic backgrounds including networking specialists and managers from European networking and research organisations, universities, worldwide sister institutions and industry representatives.

Conference locations: Tirana (2023), Trieste (2022), online (2021), Brighton (2020 - canceled), Tallinn (2019), Trondheim (2018), Linz (2017), Prague (2016), Porto (2015), Dublin (2014), Maastricht (2013), Reykjavík (2012), Prague (2011), Vilnius (2010), Málaga (2009), Bruges (2008), Kgs. Lyngby (2007), Catania (2006), Poznań (2005), Rhodes (2004), Zagreb (2003), Limerick (2002), Antalya (2001), Lisbon (2000), Lund (joint with NORDUnet conference; 1999), Dresden (1998).

The TERENA Networking Conference is the successor to the Joint European Networking Conference (JENC), which ran from 1990 to 1997. Locations: Edinburgh (1997), Budapest (1996), Tel Aviv (1995), Prague (joint with Internet Society's INET conference; 1994), Trondheim (1993), Innsbruck (1992), Blois (1991), Killarney (1990).

The JENC, in turn, was the successor to the RARE Networkshop, which ran from 1986 to 1989. Locations: Trieste (1989), Les Diablerets (1988), Valencia (1987), Copenhagen (1986). At the first workshop in this series, held in Luxembourg in May 1985, it was decided to create RARE.

== Workshops and training ==
TERENA regularly organises workshops for information exchange and training. Training workshops include the TRANSITS workshops aimed at staff members of CSIRTs and the EuroCAMP workshops to teach NREN and campus staff how to implement federated identity infrastructure.
