= GÉANT =

European computer network for research and education

- Formation: 2000
- Region served: Europe
- CEO: Lise Fuhr (2024-)
- Website: geant.org

GÉANT is the pan-European data network for the research and education community. It interconnects national research and education networks (NRENs) across Europe, enabling collaboration on projects ranging from biological science, to earth observation, to arts and culture. The GÉANT project combines a high-bandwidth, high-capacity 30,000 km network with a growing range of services. These allow researchers to collaborate, working together wherever they are located. Services include identity and trust, multi-domain monitoring, dynamic circuits and roaming via the eduroam service.

Together with European NRENs, GÉANT connects 50 million users in over 10,000 institutions. Through links to research networks in other regions (such as Internet2 and ESnet in the US, AfricaConnect in Africa, TEIN in Asia-Pacific and RedCLARA in Latin America), GÉANT enables collaboration between researchers in over half the world's countries.

Co-funded by the European Commission and Europe's NRENs, the GÉANT network was built and is operated by the GÉANT Association. The GÉANT project is a collaboration between 38 partners.

== History ==
The GÉANT project began in November 2000, entered full production operation in December 2001 (fully replacing a network called TEN-155). Originally due to finish in October 2004, it was subsequently extended until April 2005.

The second generation network, named GÉANT2, began in September 2004 and continued through 2009, growing the network to 30 national networks in 34 countries.

The next GÉANT project (GN3) began on 1 April 2009 and continued until April 2013. This was then superseded by the GN3plus project which was scheduled to run for two years. It is funded under the EC's seventh research and development Research Framework Programme (often referred to as FP7).

This was followed by the GN4 series of projects (GN4-1, GN4-2, and GN4-3) funded within the seven-year Horizon 2020 Framework Partnership Agreement (FPA).

The project is now in its fifth iteration (GN5) funded under the seven-year Horizon Europe FPA. GN5-1 ran from January 2023 to December 2024. GN5-2, the current project, started in January 2025.

== Technology ==
As well as providing the high-bandwidth links across Europe, the GÉANT network also acts as a testbed for new technology.

It was the first "hybrid" network deployed on an international scale, combining routed IP and switched infrastructure. This enables the network to offer general traffic alongside virtual "private" network paths for projects, such as the Large Hadron Collider, which have particular requirements involving dedicated bandwidth, security and flexibility.

GÉANT supported native IPv6 since 2002 and multicast IPv6 since 2004. It is involved in network research, in areas such as carrier class network technologies, photonic switching, federated network architectures and virtualisation.

In 2013 a substantial network migration program was completed, meaning users could be offered multiple 100 Gbit/s links, with the core network supporting 500 Gbit/s and a network design that will support up to 8 Tbit/s.

Currently, 10 petabytes of data is transferred every day via the GÉANT backbone network.

== GÉANT project participants ==
The GÉANT project is a collaboration between 38 partners (including the GÉANT Association), plus one associated partner, representing all of Europe’s National Research and Education Networks (NRENs).

== Global links ==
GÉANT links to research networks in other world regions, including:

- North America (Internet2, ESnet, NISN and CANARIE)
- Latin America
- North Africa and the Middle East
- South Africa/Kenya
- The South Caucasus
- Central Asia
- Asia Pacific

These links not only help international research collaboration but also aid with projects that deliver societal benefit, such as e-health, telemedicine and weather forecasting/disaster warning systems. Allowing researchers to work within their own countries also stems migration from less developed countries, helping bridge the digital divide.

== Example projects ==
GÉANT is used by research communities, such as:

- High-energy physics
- Bio-medical sciences
- Health
- Radio astronomy
- Earth observation and early warning
- Arts and culture
