= Athens Internet Exchange =

The Athens Internet Exchange was until January 2010 the main Internet Exchange Point in Greece, offering peering connectivity between the largest commercial ISPs as well as the academic network organization, GRNET. Operational authorities were GRNET along with the Network Operations Centre of the National Technical University of Athens. It operated under the auspices of the Hellenic National Telecommunications and Posts Committee the Greek regulator.

AIX members were the following ISPs:

1. GRNET
2. Forthnet
3. Hellas OnLine
4. Altec Telecoms
5. Net One
6. Vivodi
7. Verizon Hellas
8. On Telecoms
9. Otenet
10. ORANGE BUSINESS SERVICES
11. AT&T Global Network Services Hellas
12. Vodafone NET
13. Wind
14. Tellas
15. Lannet

AIX was a founding member of European Internet Exchange Association (Euro-IX)

In January 2010, AIX was replaced by the Greek Internet Exchange.
