= Internet in Greece =

Internet in Greece reached an 82% usage rate among individuals in 2022, yet it slightly trails behind the European Union averages in digital skills among individuals aged 16–74, as highlighted in the European Commission's Digital Decade Country Report 2023. In an effort to bridge this gap and enhance digital proficiency across the nation, Greece implemented the "Works Again" law in April 2022. This law is designed to modernize the Public Employment Service, aligning it more closely with the demands of the labor market and vocational training needs. Additionally, Greece has launched a strategic initiative for Vocational Education and Training (VET) and lifelong learning. This initiative aims to revamp educational curricula to include digital and green skills.

== User statistics ==
- Top-level domain: .gr
- Internet users: 6.0 million users, 52nd in the world; 56.0% of the population, 71st in the world (2012).
- Fixed broadband: 2.5 million subscriptions, 32nd in the world; 23.5% of the population, 40th in the world (2012).
- Wireless broadband: 4.8 million, 38th in the world; 44.5% of the population, 35th in the world (2012).
- Internet hosts: 3.2 million hosts, 32nd in the world (2012).
- IPv4: 5,549,568 addresses allocated, 0.1% of the world total, 515 addresses per 1,000 people (2012).
- Internet service providers (ISPs): Approximately 23 ISPs. Two Tier 1 ISPs.

It is expected that Greece by October 2020 will be connected to Cyprus, Israel, Italy, France and Spain with Quantum Cable, 7,700 km ultra high speed fiber-optic submarine communications cable. It is expected to have 160 Tbit/s (terabits per second), capacity enough to handle up to 60% of the world's internet traffic at peak time (2018). The Quantum Cable will be laid at the same time as the 2,000 MW EuroAsia Interconnector. It will upgrade Greece to telecom hub.

According to Speedtest Global Index (February 2023), Greece's fixed broadband ranks 92nd in the world with an average downstream speed of 44.60 Mbit/s, and is statistically considered one of the lowest in Europe.

== Broadband ==
=== Fixed broadband ===
In 2022, Greece's efforts to enhance its fixed broadband infrastructure continued, with the adoption of services at speeds of at least 100 Mbit/s reported at 20%, remaining below the EU average of 55%. The coverage levels for both the Fixed Very High Capacity Network (VHCN) and Fibre to the Premises (FTTP) were reported at 28%, which are below the EU averages of 73% and 56%, respectively. To address this, the National Broadband Plan (2021–2027) has been developed, targeting an increase in gigabit connectivity across the country with infrastructure capable of 100 Mbit/s, and the potential for upgrades to 1 Gbit/s. Significant initiatives under this plan include the completion of the Super-Fast Broadband (SFBB) project in September 2022, which facilitated the distribution of approximately 140,000 vouchers to assist households and businesses in obtaining high-speed internet access. Concurrently, the Ultrafast Broadband project aims to extend necessary infrastructure to 18% of the population.

=== Mobile broadband ===
For mobile broadband, Greece has made advancements, particularly in the rollout of 5G networks. By 2022, Greece achieved 86% coverage in overall 5G networks, ahead of the EU average of 81%. In addition, Greece has been proactive in allocating 5G spectrum, with 99% of the total harmonized 5G spectrum assigned by 2023, significantly above the EU average of 68%. Despite these strides in 5G deployment, the uptake of mobile broadband among individuals in Greece was reported at 76% in 2021, falling below the EU average of 87%.

Mobile broadband offers are available from all three national mobile phone operators Cosmote, Vodafone Greece and NOVA Greece, with more than 1Gbit/s downlink speeds. Mobile broadband was heavily marketed during 2008 by all three, leading to a surge in mobile Internet usage, primarily with mobile professionals and young users.

The access technologies used by all three providers are primarily LTE (and LTE+) as well as 5G with 90th percentile figures for Cosmote reaching over 240Mbit/s and for Vodafone Greece and NOVA Greece over 110Mbit/s.

=== Satellite broadband ===
Greece is covered by various satellite broadband services:

- Hellas-Sat offers satellite service under the "Hellas Sat Net" brandname. OTE, as one of the owners of Hellas Sat, offers Hellas Sat Net service through its distribution channels (website, shops etc.). The company operates its services with user-paid subscriptions. The equipment is installed by Hellas Sat accredited engineers and it includes a Satnet S3020 DVB - RCS VSAT Terminal (Advantech) satellite modem and a 0,96m Antenna (satellite dish with transmitter receiver). Hellas Sat Net connections are also used to interconnect public administration offices and schools in remote areas (mostly remote islands of the Aegean Sea) to the national administration network Syzefxis and to the Internet).
- Tooway covers Greece with broadband satellite Internet.Operations started at 2011. they offer a downstream speed of up to 22 Mbit/s and an upstream speed of up to 6 Mbit/s. Tooway also offers subscription-based broadband services for various customers.
- BigBlu is a UK-based company that begun offering satellite internet connection since August 2019 to the Greek market. Unlimited packages with speed of up to 50 Mbit/s and an upstream speed of up to 6 Mbit/s. It specializes in addressing people in areas without a basic telephone connection.
- Elon Musk's Starlink also provides satellite internet access within Greece since its commercial rollout in Q2 2022. It is currently the best option suitable for remote locations that don't have any wired access to the internet. It promises a stable and low-latency experience which also allows gaming. Its downstream bandwidth is known to average within 150-300 Mbit/s.

== Digital public services ==
In 2022, Greece advanced in digitalizing public services, evidenced by an 81% e-government user rate among internet users, surpassing the EU average of 74%. However, Greece's scores for digital public services for citizens and businesses were 65 and 74 out of 100, respectively, both below the EU averages of 77 and 84. Significant improvements were noted from the previous year, with citizen services increasing by 13 points and business services by 26 points. The score for mobile-friendly public services rose to 85, yet it remains below the EU average of 93. Access to e-health records in Greece was scored at 61, below the EU average of 72.

== Internet censorship and surveillance ==
Greece practices some internet censorship, including the blocking of websites that offer unauthorized online gambling. Access to many websites known for redistributing pirated software have also been restricted.

The constitution provides for freedom of speech and press, and the government generally respects these rights in practice. Independent media are active and express a wide variety of views. Individuals can criticize the government publicly or privately without reprisal, and the government does not impede criticism. However, the law provides for prosecution of individuals who "intentionally incite others to actions that could provoke discrimination, hatred, or violence against persons or groups of persons on the basis of their race or ethnic origin or who express ideas insulting to persons or to groups of persons because of their race or ethnic origin.". In practice the government has never invoked these provisions. The law permits any prosecutor to order the seizure of publications that insult the president, offend any religion, contain obscenity, advocate for the violent overthrow of the political system, or disclose military secrets. The law provides criminal penalties for defamation, however, in most criminal defamation cases, authorities released defendants on bail pending trial and they served no time in jail. The constitution and law prohibit arbitrary interference with privacy, family, home, or correspondence. However, NGOs such as the Greek Helsinki Monitor report that authorities do not always respect these provisions in practice.

On October 28, 2012, police arrested a Greek journalist, Kostas Vaxevanis, for violating personal privacy laws for publishing the "Lagarde List" of more than 2,000 alleged Greek tax evaders with Swiss bank accounts. On November 1, a court acquitted him; prosecutors appealed the verdict, and a re-trial date was pending at the end of 2012. In the 2013 re-trial, he was acquitted again.

In September 2012 the cyber-crime police arrested a 27-year-old man, F. Loizos, charging him with "malicious blasphemy and insulting religion". The man reportedly created a Facebook page under the name "Elder Pastitsios" that played on the name of a legendary Mount Athos monk famous for his prophecies about Greece and Orthodox Christianity, and the name of a popular Greek dish. The cyber-crime police seized the man's laptop and removed the Facebook page. On January 16, 2014, he was found guilty of "repeatedly insulting religion" and was sentenced to ten months in jail, suspended while the prosecutor had recommended a smaller sentence. In the 2017 re-trial, however, the court acquitted Loizos.

On August 6, 2009, the most-visited Greek blog (troktiko.blogspot.com) was shut down. Although Google cites potential violations of the terms of use, comments implying other reasons behind the closure of the Troktiko blog were published in several leading Greek blogs. The blog went back on-line a few months later and suspended its activities in July 2010, after the assassination of Sokratis Giolias, its administrator.

On June 29, 2009, Georgios Sanidas, the soon-to-be-retired Prosecutor of the Greek Supreme Court (Areios Pagos), declared that "Internet-based communications are not covered by current privacy laws" and are thus open to surveillance by the police. Such surveillance would be, according to Sanidas's mandate, completely legal. Following this proclamation, Greek bloggers, legal experts and notable personalities from the media have claimed that Sanidas's mandate contravenes both the Greek constitution and current EU laws regarding the privacy of Internet communications. Furthermore, this mandate has been greatly criticised as being a first step towards full censorship of all Internet content.

== See also ==
- Greek Internet Exchange (GR-IX), an independent, non-profit Internet exchange point located in Athens.
- Greek Research and Technology Network (GRNET) (Greek: Εθνικό Δίκτυο Έρευνας και Τεχνολογίας, ΕΔΕΤ), the national research and education network of Greece.
- Hellenic Telecommunications Organization S.A. (Greek: Οργανισμός Τηλεπικοινωνιών Ελλάδος Α.Ε.), known by its Greek initials OTE, is the dominant telecommunications provider in Greece.
