= Ariadnet =

The National Research and Academic Network (NREN) of Greece the period 1984 -1995, also known as Ariadne, Ariadne network, Ariadne-t, initiated in 1984 as Programme Ariadne by Nicolas Malagardis (worked at INRIA in France) under the Ministry of Research and Technology (minister Georgios Lianis), in line with R&D policy of the EU Commission (DGXIII) and became founding member of COSINE (Cooperation for Open Systems Interconnection Networking in Europe) and RARE, with contributions to its technical reports.

In 1987 the first full packet switching node in Greece connected to the French X.25 node in Paris at 9.6K bps via a local HELPAK line from OTE in Athens and a COSINE Project. The report was published in 1988.

In 1988, the General Secretariat of Research and Technology (secretary Prof. Eleftherios Economou at the University of Crete) assigned a new management for Programme Ariadne to be Prof. Costantine Halatsis, Institute director at the "Demokritos". All facilities (equipment, communication lines, offices) were relocated to the campus of Demokritos (Institute of Informatics & Telecommunications) at Agia Paraskevi, Attica from downtown Athens. As a RARE member Ariadne participated to the joining with RIPE (Réseaux IP Européens), or European IP Networks.

In 1990 Ariadne with the encouragement and support of Tony Bates, the approval of Peter Kirstein and James Hutton of the UK NREN JANET acquired internet NSFNET connectivity via a 64 kbit/s X.25 from IXI-COSINE, this took place before the EuropaNET IP service was established. IANA providing resources for network and Autonomous system addressing. Registration in .ARPA provided by RedIRIS gratis Ignacio Martinez and JANET.

When Prof. C.Halatsis moved to the University of Athens, the management was assigned to Dr. A. Arvilias, director of Computer Center of "Demokritos" around 1991. During this period the first public ISP in Greece was created registered in the global DNS as "ariadne-t dot gr".

In 1991 Ariadne participated in CHEOPS an advanced network experiment (8 Mbit/s) with CERN via Olympus satellite and an SRI International report requested a contributing text. The team of Ariadne helped Scientists of "Demokritos" understand, use in their work and disseminate to their communities the importance of Internet.

In 1992 Ariadne supported by Brian Carpenter established a 9.6 kbit/s direct link to CERN that later became part of EBONE, a network map shows the status of the network in 1993.

During 1992-1994 the EU's DGXIII VALUE II project - v.5805 "Open Systems Interconnection national nodes and Administrators" assigned to the Institute of Informatics & Telecommunications of the national research center "Demokritos" was implemented that devised a mixed technology plan (TCP/IP and X.400, X.25 ) that resulted in large scale development of internet connectivity to universities, government, and SMEs. The project registered in DNS as "EPMHS dot GR", the pattern "MHS" signifying the main application being messaging and gateways based on RFC 987 that required both technologies OSI and IP.

Ariadne became almost self-financed by more than 80 partner contributions and The Ariadne IP Service.

In 1994, the General Secretariat for Research and Technology assigned a new manager and support organization to Prof. V.Maglaris of National Technical University. The network operations center was relocated to the National Technical University campus, a new satellite 256 kbit/s uplink to Delivery of Advanced Network Technology to Europe (DANTE), as well as a new network name GRNET and plan was created using the resources and people of Ariadne. Migration of sites to the newly designed network took 2–3 years to complete. Notable sites such as the Parliament of Greece, the National Observatory, the Atomic Energy Authority continued for several years their connection to Ariadne.

In 1995 "Demokritos", National Technical University and the Greek Telecom OTE jointly established a new company OTENET as the nationwide ISP using the experience of Ariadne.

IN 1997–1998 Ariadne participated in projects such as NICE national network inter-connection experiments and EXPERT' based on ATM and Eutelsat.

In 2002, the computer center of "Demokritos" created post-humously a webpage for Ariadne using some original graphic designs and posters.

In 2014 "Demokritos" transferred its shares of DANTE to the newly formed Terena Association, as the legal entity representing Greece in DANTE as shown in the OSIRIS report of 2011.

Currently, in the year 2002, Ariadne, as shown in the RIPE whois data base, is the campus network of "Demokritos", the main Data-Center, a LIR for collaborating organizations based at the Network Services laboratory of the Institute of Informatics and Telecommunications, it is a major GRNET site, hosting its metropolitan area network and Hellasgrid nodes.
