= Greek Watergate =

Greek Watergate may refer to:

- the Greek wiretapping case 2004–05
- the 2022 Greek wiretapping scandal
