= VOA3R =

European research project

- Virtual Open Access Agriculture & Aquaculture Repository Project: Sharing Scientific and Scholarly Research related to Agriculture, Food, and Environment
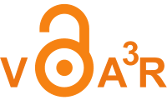
- Keywords: Agriculture, Aquaculture, Open Access, Research
- Project type: European Research Consortium Project (ICT-PSP Programme of the European Commission)
- Funding agency: European Commission
- Framework programme: Seventh Framework Programme
- Reference: 250525
- Objective: Creation of open access, online repository for agriculture and aquaculture research
- Project coordinator: University of Alcalá, Dr. Miguel-Angel Sicilia
- Participants: University of Duisburg-Essen, Germany; Agricultural University of Athens, Greece; Greek Research and Technology Network, Greece; Swedish University of Agricultural Sciences, Sweden; University of Minho, Portugal; Hasselt University, Belgium; International Centre for Research in Organic Food Systems, Denmark; French National Institute for Agricultural Research, France; Czech University of Life Sciences Prague, Czech Republic; ACTA Informatique, France; Agricultural Research Institute, Cyprus; Consorzio Interuniversitario, Italy; Technological Educational Institute of Athens, Greece; Food and Agriculture Organization
- Budget: Total: 3,600,000 Euro
- Duration: 06.2010 – 05.2013
- Website: voa3r.eu

The Virtual Open Access Agriculture & Aquaculture Repository Project (VOA3R) was a European research project financed through the Seventh Framework Programme of the European Union. The project consortium was composed of fourteen partners from ten different countries, as well as representatives from FAO of the United Nations.

The general objective of the VOA3R project was to improve the spread of European agriculture and aquaculture research results by using an innovative approach to sharing open access research products. The project tasks and work packages carried out innovative experiments with open access to scientific agriculture and aquaculture contents and developed and provided services that integrated previously existing open access repositories and scholarly publication management systems by means of a federation approach. The key product of the project was the VOA3R platform.

== Overview of the VOA3R Platform ==
The VOA3R platform aimed at reusing existing and mature metadata and semantic technology to deploy an advanced community-focused integrated service for the retrieval of relevant open content, and data that includes explicit models of the scholarly methods and procedures used and of the practical tasks targeted by applied research (which represent a principal information need expression for practitioners). The service enabled researchers to formulate their information needs in terms of elements of the scientific methods established in their field (variables, techniques, assessment methods, kinds of objects of interest, etc.) combined with topical descriptions as expressed in metadata. The community approach enabled the enhancement of information seeking with extended evaluation elements (as for example, ratings, public reviews, social tagging and links to supporting or conflicting reports) that complement and go beyond the traditional, anonymous peer review process which results are not made available openly. The technology used would itself become open source, so that the model of the service could be adopted by enterprises (including SMEs) or other kinds of institutions as a value-added, community-oriented model for open access content.

== VOA3R Main Objectives ==
The general objective of the project was to improve the spread of European agriculture and aquaculture research results by using an innovative approach to sharing open access research products.

The concrete objectives towards this were the following:

- Devising and providing a platform that integrates metadata from existing open access repositories that provides a single point of access to scholarly research in the area agriculture and aquaculture.
- Analyzing and modelling research work processes, inputs and outcomes, coming out with a detailed meta-model serving the basis for devising new search and navigation interfaces that are specific to scholarly information needs during their work processes.
- Analyzing existing and alternative approaches to the evaluation of scholarly research, using traditional peer review mechanisms as the point of departure to be contrasted with alternative, novel approaches.
- Experimenting on alternatives to peer review in the context of open access repositories, based on the meta-models for research work developed.
- Formalizing meta-models of research work, coming up with ontologies that enable new forms of search and browsing enhanced by existing semantic metadata repository tools.
- Specifying metadata profiles for partners inside and outside the project that enable them to federate with the platform.
- Adapting and/or configuring the existing systems provided by the partners to interoperate with the main integrated VOA3R service, thus achieving a significant mass of open access content.
- Running real-use pilots with target communities that enable data gathering and experimentation with the solution.
- Analyzing data and assessment results from the pilots in order to elaborate a roadmap and guidelines for the evolution of the platform and for its transfer to other domains.

== See also ==
- Metadata
- Seventh Framework Programme
- Semantic web
- European Research Council
- Directorate-General for Research (European Commission)
- European Institute of Innovation and Technology
- The European Network of Innovation Agencies
