= Otenet =

Internet service provider

OTENET
- Company type: Public
- Industry: Telecommunications
- Founded: 1996
- Headquarters: Athens, Greece
- Area served: Greece
- Products: Internet Services Provider, Telecommunications provider and Internet solutions
- Website: www.otenet.gr

Otenet was a major internet service provider of Greece established in 1995. The company is now consolidated into the parent company OTE. Otenet S.A. was an S.A. (corporation) providing Internet products and services. The major shareholder of OTEnet was OTE. The other share holders were NCSR Demokritos (Ariadnet) and National Technical University of Athens each holding 10,000 shares. OTE eventually bought back the shares from these organizations in 2006.

== Performance ==
The quality of OTEnet's services was often described as 'inadequate'. Especially the poor performance of their networks on Greece's many small islands has drawn considerable criticism.
