= Telecommunications in Greece =

The telecommunications and postal services market in Greece is regulated by the Hellenic Telecommunications and Post Commission (EETT).

== Landline telephone ==
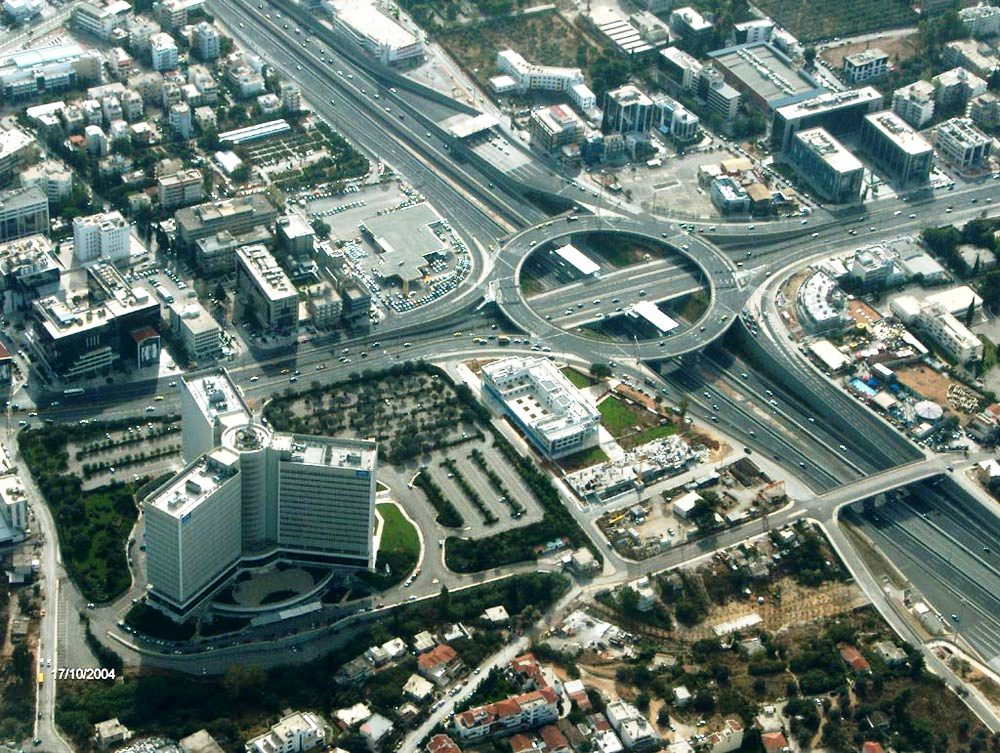
OTE headquarters in Athens.

COSMOTE, the former state monopoly, is the main player in fixed-line telephony. Since the liberalization of the telecommunications market, COSMOTE (OTE) has been slowly losing market share to "alternative", competing telecom operators, such as Vodafone, Nova. As of 2005, COSMOTE's share on the market hovered around 76%.

Telephones – main lines in use: 6,348,800 (2004).

Telephone system:

- modern networks reach all areas; microwave radio relay carries most traffic; 35,000 kilometers of optical fibers and extensive open-wire network; submarine cables to off-shore islands.
- domestic: 100% digital; microwave radio relay, open wire, and submarine cable.
- international: 100% digital; tropospheric scatter; 8 submarine cables; satellite earth stations – 2 Intelsat (1 Atlantic Ocean and 1 Indian Ocean), 1 Eutelsat, and 1 Inmarsat (Indian Ocean region).

== Cellular network ==
Greece has three mobile telecom companies; Cosmote, Vodafone and Nova.

Number of active lines: 20,285,000 (September 2009), which means 180% penetration.

== Satellite ==
Greece owns one telecommunications satellite, named Hellas Sat, which provides telecommunication services in a major part of Eastern Europe and Western Asia.

== Internet ==
4,893,840 IP addresses, 1.6638e+30 IPv6 addresses, 5,920,000 Internet Users, 2,396,700 broadband connections, 23 Internet Service Providers.

== Mail ==
Hellenic Post is the state-owned postal service provider of Greece. A number of private courier services, such as DHL, ACS, United Parcel Service and FedEx (Speedex), also operate in Greece.

== See also ==
- Economy of Greece
- OTE
- Hellenic Telecommunications and Post Commission
