= Greek Internet Exchange =

Internet exchange point in Greece

- Full name: Greek Internet Exchange
- Abbreviation: GR-IX
- Founded: 2009
- Location: Athens, Thessaloniki Greece
- Website: www.gr-ix.gr
- Members: 68 [Athens], 19 [Thessaloniki]
- Peak: 927 Gbit/s
- Daily (avg.): 615 Gbit/s

The Greek Internet Exchange (GR-IX) is an Internet exchange point located in Athens and Thessaloniki in Greece. It was founded in 2009 in order to replace the Athens Internet Exchange as the principal Internet Exchange Point in Greece, which was achieved in January 2010. GR-IX is non-profit, independent and is supervised by the Greek Research and Technology Network (GRNET). GR-IX is a member of the European Internet Exchange Association.

== History ==
The predecessor of GR-IX, Athens Internet Exchange (AIX) was created by GRNET in 1997, to provide interconnection services between the Greek ISPs. By the late 1990s, the way AIX was set up was not completely satisfactory to the member ISPs: since AIX was located in Hellenic Telecommunications Organization (OTE) facilities, providers had to lease lines from OTE in order to connect to AIX. Additionally, ISPs had the right to charge other members for exchanged traffic, a right sometimes overused by the larger providers. To deal with these issues, GRNET decided in 2008 to create a new exchange, GR-IX. GR-IX went operational in 2009 and by January 2010 all AIX members had completed their move to GR-IX.

== Members ==
Some of the member of GR-IX are:

- Amazon
- Cloudflare
- Cyta
- Forthnet
- Greek Research and Technology Network
- Hurricane Electric
- Microsoft
- OTE
- Vodafone
- Verizon Communications
- WIND Hellas

== Network ==
GR-IX holds three points of presence in Athens; one is located at 48 King Constantinos Street, at a building owned by the National Hellenic Research Foundation, one at Digital Realty's Data Center in Koropi and one at Telecom Italia Sparkle Greece's Data Center in Metamorfosi.

GR-IX has also one point of presence in Thessaloniki, located in SYNAPSECOM's S.A. Data Center in Kalohori.
