= Vodafone Greece =

Greek telecommunications company

Vodafone Greece S.A
- Type: Subsidiary
- Industry: Telecommunications
- Founded: 1992; 34 years ago
- Headquarters: Chalandri, Greece
- Area served: Greece
- Key people: Achileas Kanaris (CEO)
- Services: Mobile telephony Wireless broadband Fixedline telephony Broadband internet IPTV
- Parent: Vodafone Group Plc
- Website: www.vodafone.gr www.vodafonecu.gr

Vodafone Greece (officially known as Vodafone-Panafon Hellenic Telecommunications Company S.A., formerly Panafon) is the Greek subsidiary of Vodafone Group Plc. In 2004 it was the leading mobile operator in Greece. The company's headquarters are in Chalandri, one of the northern suburbs of Athens.

== Details ==
Subscriber numbers issued in Greece by Vodafone begin with the three-digit prefixes 694 and 695, followed by a unique seven-digit combination. However, not all such numbers necessarily belong to Vodafone subscribers because of number portability for mobile telephony networks.

The network name is displayed as "vodafone GR" on most handsets except for Apple and Samsung devices, where it was shortened to display as "vf-GR". As a response to the 2019/20 COVID-19 pandemic, Vodafone pushed out an update to all compatible devices to replace the network text with "menoume spiti", which translates to "we're staying home".

On 17 December 2020, the auction for the 5G frequencies was completed. The frequencies that Vodafone gained are as follows:

- 14 blocks on the frequency zone of 3400-3800MHz
- 2 blocks on the frequency zone of 700MHz
- 4 blocks on the frequency zone of 2GHz
- 2 blocks on the frequency zone of 26GHz

Vodafone was the highest bidder for the frequencies spending up to 130 million euros. The 5G network became accessible Vodafone Greece subscribers in January 2021.

== History ==
Vodafone Greece was established in Greece in 1992 under the trade name Panafon – with the participation of Vodafone Group Plc., France Telecom, Intracom and Data Bank, and was officially renamed to Vodafone in January 2002, in framework of the changing of its trade name, Panafon. In December 1998, the company listed its shares in the Athens and London stock exchange, while in July 2004 it was de-listed from ATHEX. Vodafone Group Plc. is the company’s major shareholder with 99.8% of Vodafone Greece shares. As of 2003, Vodafone has had an exclusive contract with popular pop musician Sakis Rouvas as the spokesperson for the company in the Greek advertising campaign. Rouvas has completed multiple commercials for the company as well as advertising the brand within his music videos and albums. Likewise, Vodafone is the primary sponsor of his large concerts and recordings. While other record labels and artists do advertisements for other mobile companies as an exchange for sponsoring, Vodafone is the only Greek mobile company to be advertised primarily by a sole artist, with Rouvas' effort being a major marketing ploy to youth and young adult consumers.

Vodafone Greece had a deal with Nova to offer the Nova Sports channels for its own IPTV service, Vodafone TV. In March 2021 it was announced that the service had 150,000 subscribers, making it the third-largest TV provider in Greece. Vodafone TV has also access to Disney+, HBO Max, and Viaplay content.

== Vodafone CU ==
Vodafone CU (Creative Users) is a specialized prepaid SIM card, which offers discount prices for those who are between 18 and 24 years old, but also serves those who are 25 and up. Vodafone CU debuted as Panafon CU in October 2000, and the name of the service was changed in January 2002 from Panafon CU to Vodafone CU, together with the trade name of the company from Panafon to Vodafone.

== Hellas Online and Cyta Hellas ==
Hellas Online was a fixed-line and internet service operator founded in 1993. Hellas Online owned and operated a fiber optic network of approximately 3,500 kilometres (November 2008). Its core backbone network is the second largest network in Greece after that of OTE, the incumbent operator. In 2014 Hellas online merged with Vodafone and for the first time, Vodafone Greece started to offer fixed-line and internet services at home.

Cyta Hellas was a fixed-line operator owned by Cyta that offered home internet, TV services and was an operator on Vodafone's network. On 1 April 2019, Cyta Hellas merged with Vodafone, gaining 300,000 customers. Around the same time of the merger, Cyta customers got a notice that they would be transferred to the Vodafone network as part of Vodafone's agreement to cease the Cyta Hellas brand by 2020. Vodafone also took 1,200 kilometers of optical fiber that Cyta had built.

== See also ==
- Communications in Greece
- Greek wiretapping case 2004–05
- List of mobile network operators in Europe
