= Vivodi Telecom =

Vivodi's logo

Vivodi was a private telecom operator in Greece that offered telephone rates for OTE subscribers.

== History ==
Vivodi was acquired by On Telecoms, a telecommunications business backed by UK-based Argo Capital Management, in 2009.

== ADSL ==
Vivodi's main service was internet services, and ADSL was its main product for private customers.

Vivodi offered ADSL lines by utilizing local loop unbundling, which allowed private companies to have full or shared access to the local loop of the customer. Through this, it offered ADSL lines with data rates up to 4 Mbit/s and ADSL2+ lines with data rates up to 20 Mbit/s in some districts of the Athens Metropolitan Area, as well as in Thessaloniki.

== See also ==
- Broadband in Greece
