= Syzefxis =

Syzefxis (σύζευξις in Greek, meaning coupling) or "National Public Administration Network", is a project of the Greek Ministry of the Interior, Public Administration and Decentralization, aiming at the evolvement of the voice, video and data infrastructure of the Public Sector in Greece. The project was about installing and maintaining a stable and fast computer network based on the Internet Protocol for the public sector organizations, ministries, municipalities, hospitals, social security foundations, schools and many other, counting in total about two thousand nodes.

The network provides:

- voice and data connectivity for the 2,000 nodes,
- broadband internet services and E-mail,
- a Website for each node supporting value added services, like directory services etc.,
- Public key infrastructure for the users,
- synchronous and asynchronous education,
- teleconferencing services,
- free telephony based on VoIP technology between all nodes.

The network's architecture is based on the hub-and-spoke design. The network was divided in six administrative areas, called "islets". These are:

- Islet 1, Athens area
- Islet 2, covering the rest of Attica outside Athens
- Islet 3, Thessaloniki
- Islet 4, Crete
- Islet 5, Continental Greece, Thessaly, Macedonia, Thrace and Northern Aegean Islands
- Islet 6, Epirus, Peloponnese and the Ionian Islands

The implementation of the project was divided in nine subprojects, seven of which are telecommunication projects. The other two are more information technology-oriented. The subprojects are:

- Subproject 1, the installation and interconnection of islet 1 users,
- Subproject 2, the installation and interconnection of islet 2 users,
- Subproject 3, the installation and interconnection of islet 3 users,
- Subproject 4, the installation and interconnection of islet 4 users,
- Subproject 5, the installation and interconnection of islet 5 users,
- Subproject 6, the installation and interconnection of islet 6 users,
- Subproject 7, the installation and configuration of the backbone network,
- Subproject 8, the training management,
- Subproject 9, the public key infrastructure.
