= National Centre of Scientific Research "Demokritos" =

Greek research center

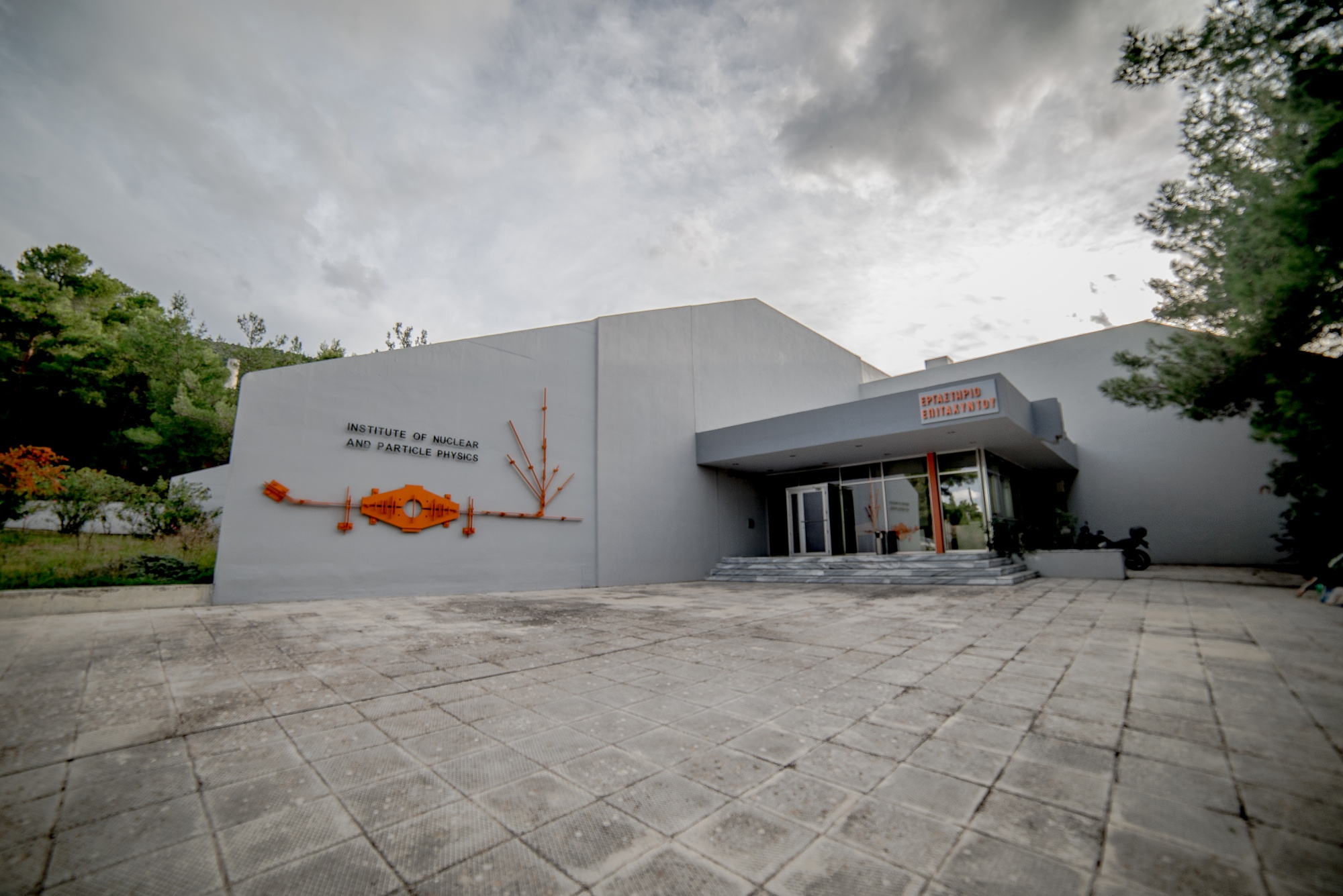
- Entrance of Institute of Nuclear and Particle Physics NCSR Demokritos
- Established: July 1961
- Chair: Georgios Nounesis
- Staff: 180 Researchers, 500 Research Personnel
- Formerly called: Research Centre for Nuclear Research "Demokritos"
- Location: Agia Paraskevi, Athens, Greece
- Coordinates: 37.9991368°N 23.8178859°E
- Website: https://www.demokritos.gr/

The National Centre of Scientific Research "Demokritos" (NCSRD; Greek: Εθνικό Κέντρο Έρευνας Φυσικών Επιστημών (ΕΚΕΦΕ) "Δημόκριτος") is a research center in Greece, employing over 1,000 researchers, engineers, technicians and administrative personnel. It focuses on several fields of natural sciences and engineering and hosts laboratory facilities.

The facilities cover approximately 150 acres (61 hectares) of land at Aghia Paraskevi, Athens, ten kilometers from the center of the city, on the northern side of Hymettus mountain. The buildings cover an area of approximately 35.000 m^{2} (8.6 acres).

The NCSRD is a self-administered governmental legal entity, under the supervision of the General Secretariat of Research and Innovation of the Ministry of Development and Investment.

== History ==
The Centre was established in 1961 as an independent division of the public sector under the name Research Centre for Nuclear Research "Demokritos", named in honour of the Greek philosopher Democritus. In 1985 it was renamed and given self-governing jurisdiction under the auspices of the General Secretariat of Research and Technology. The original objective of the newly created center was the advancement of nuclear research and technology for peaceful purposes. Today, its activities cover several fields of science and engineering.

== Research Institutes ==
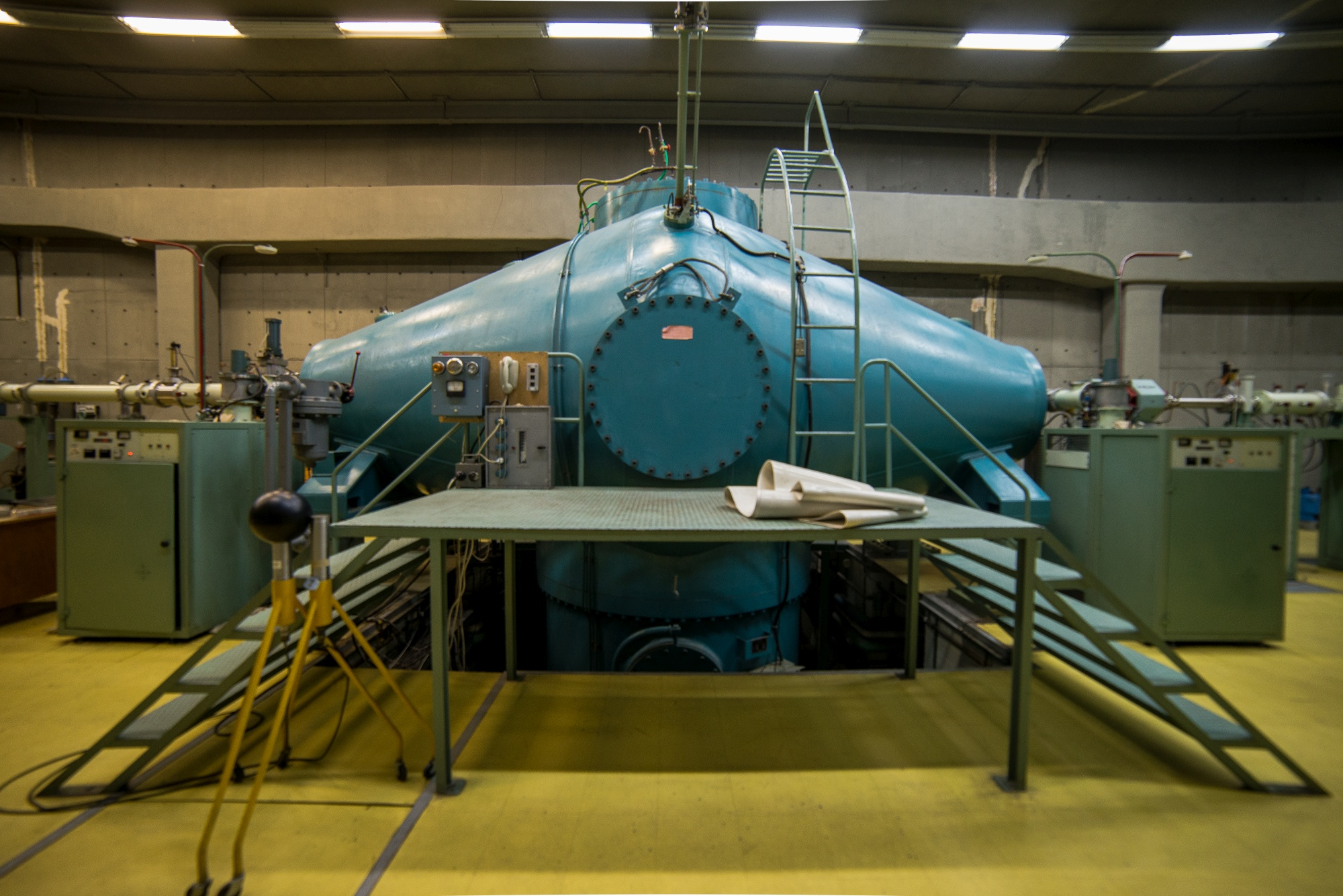
Ion Accelerator Tandem

The research activities of the centre are conducted in six administratively independent institutes:

- Institute of Informatics and Telecommunications (IIT)
- Institute of Biosciences and Applications (IBA)
- Institute of Nuclear and Particle Physics (INPP)
- Institute of Nanoscience and Nanotechnology (INN)
- Institute of Nuclear & Radiological Sciences and Technology, Energy & Safety (INRASTES)
- Institute of Quantum Computing and Quantum Technology (IQCQT)

The INPP at Demokritos operates Greece's only nuclear reactor, a 5 MW research reactor.

== The Environmental Research Laboratory (EREL) ==
The EREL is part of the Institute of Nuclear Technology - Radiation Protection (INT-RP) and it is one of the largest scientific research teams in Greece dealing with environmental research. The staff consists of 13 Ph.D. and 5 M.Sc. scientists, 4 Ph.D. students, 1 technician and 1 administrative assistant.

The research and development activities of the EREL include:

- Weather Forecasting
- Urban air quality
- Emissions inventories
- Air quality measurement, analysis and predictions
- Air pollutant dispersion modelling over terrain of high complexity on local, urban and regional scales.
- Transport in porous media and characterization of porous materials
- Soil remediation

=== The DETRACT atmospheric dispersion modeling system ===
The DETRACT atmospheric dispersion modelling system, developed by the EREL, is an integrated set of modules for modelling air pollution dispersion over highly complex terrain.

== The Media Networks Laboratory ==
The Laboratory is a part of the “Digital Communications” research programme of the Institute of Informatics and Telecommunications, NCSR “Demokritos”. It is located in the premises of NCSR in Athens, Greece and employs high-qualified research personnel, specialised in networking and multimedia technologies. The laboratory has been active for more than a decade in a number of national and European research projects, following the reputation of the Institute of Informatics and Telecommunication in the global research communities. In this context, it maintains close collaboration with Greek and international partners, both industrial and academic. The research achievements of the laboratory are reflected in a considerable number of publications in journals and conferences.

The lab pioneered in 2001 by developing the first digital television platform to support fully interactive services in Greece (and one of the first ones in Europe).

== Gallery ==
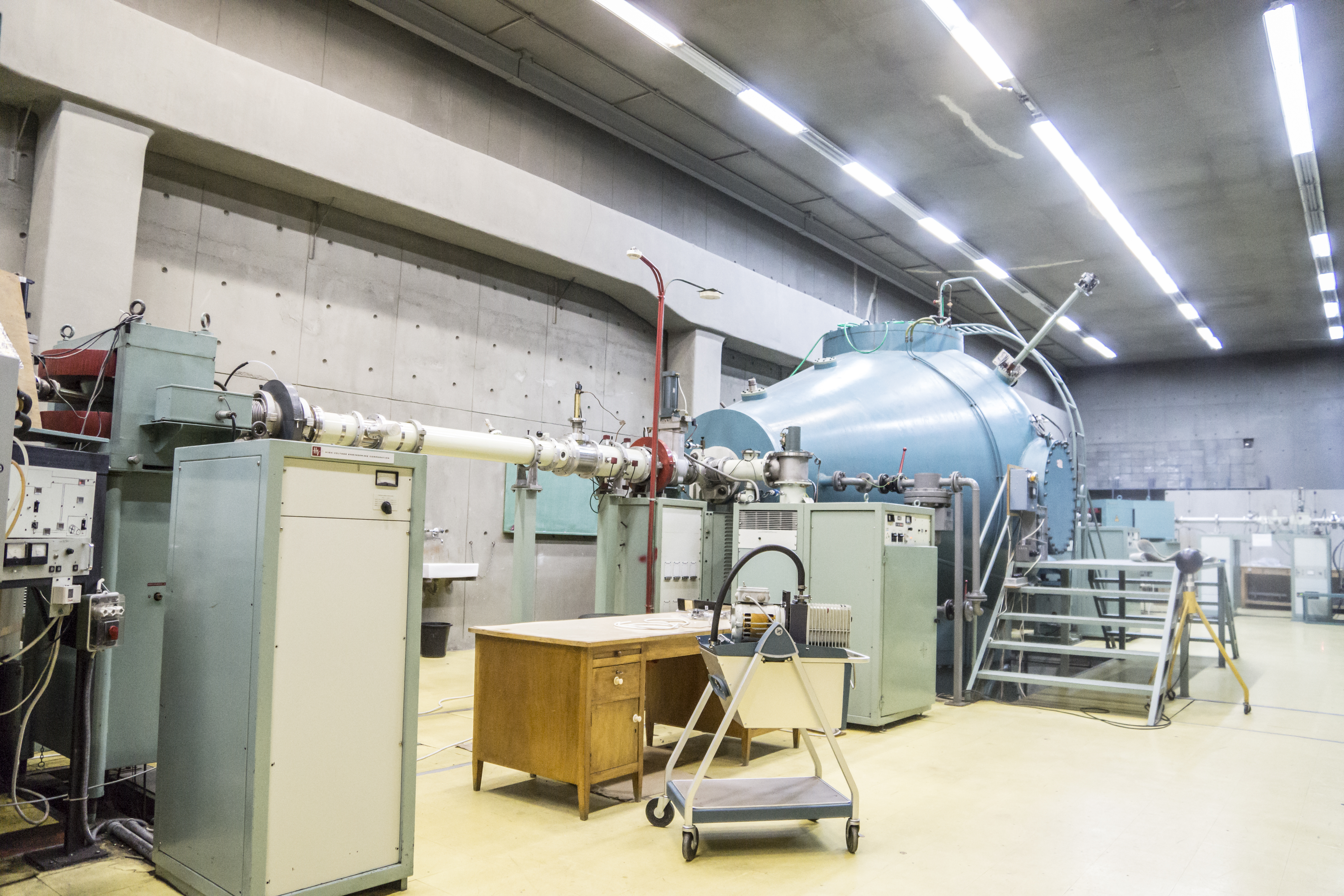
Ion Accelerator Tandem

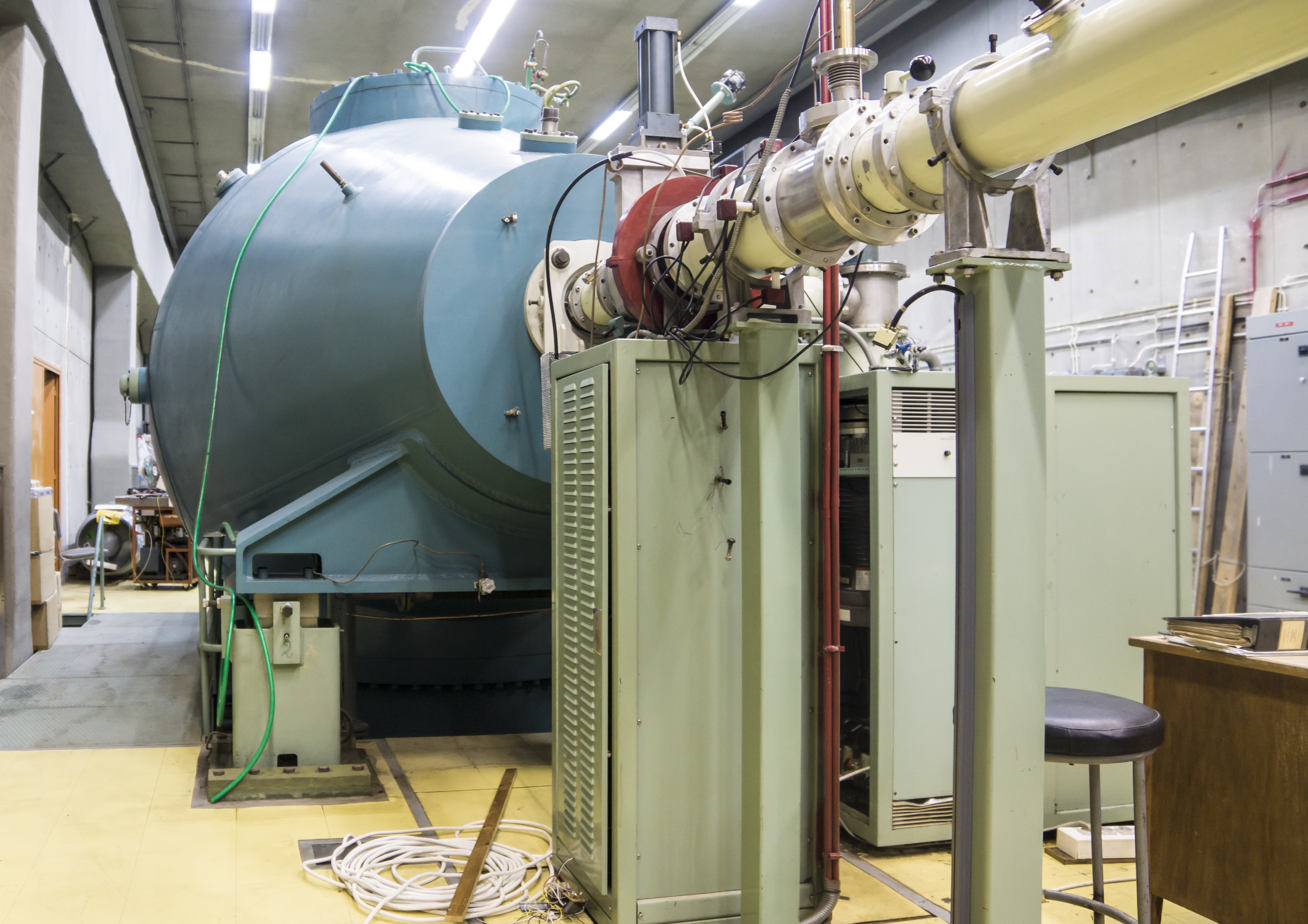
Ion Accelerator Tandem

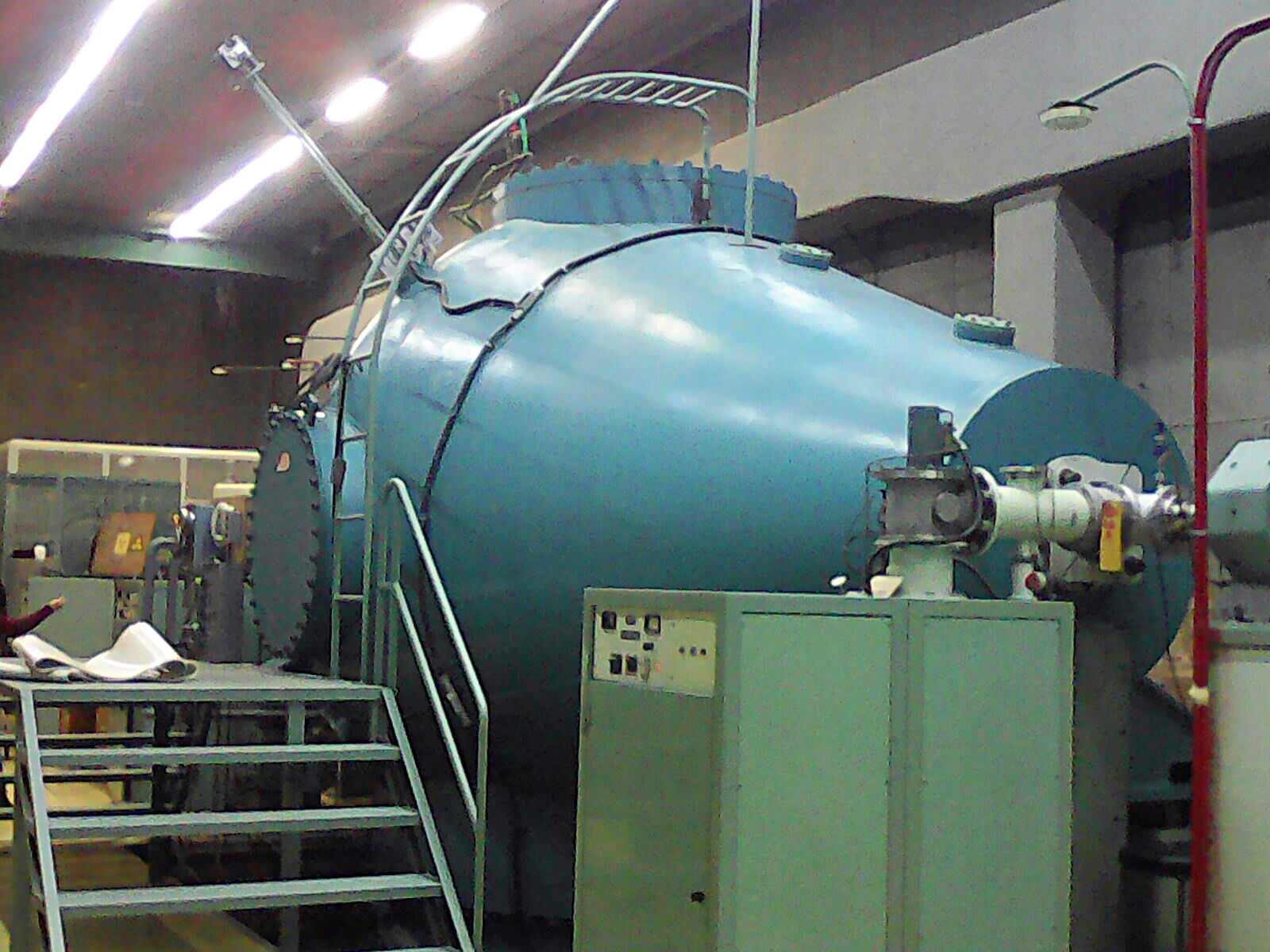
Ion Accelerator Tandem

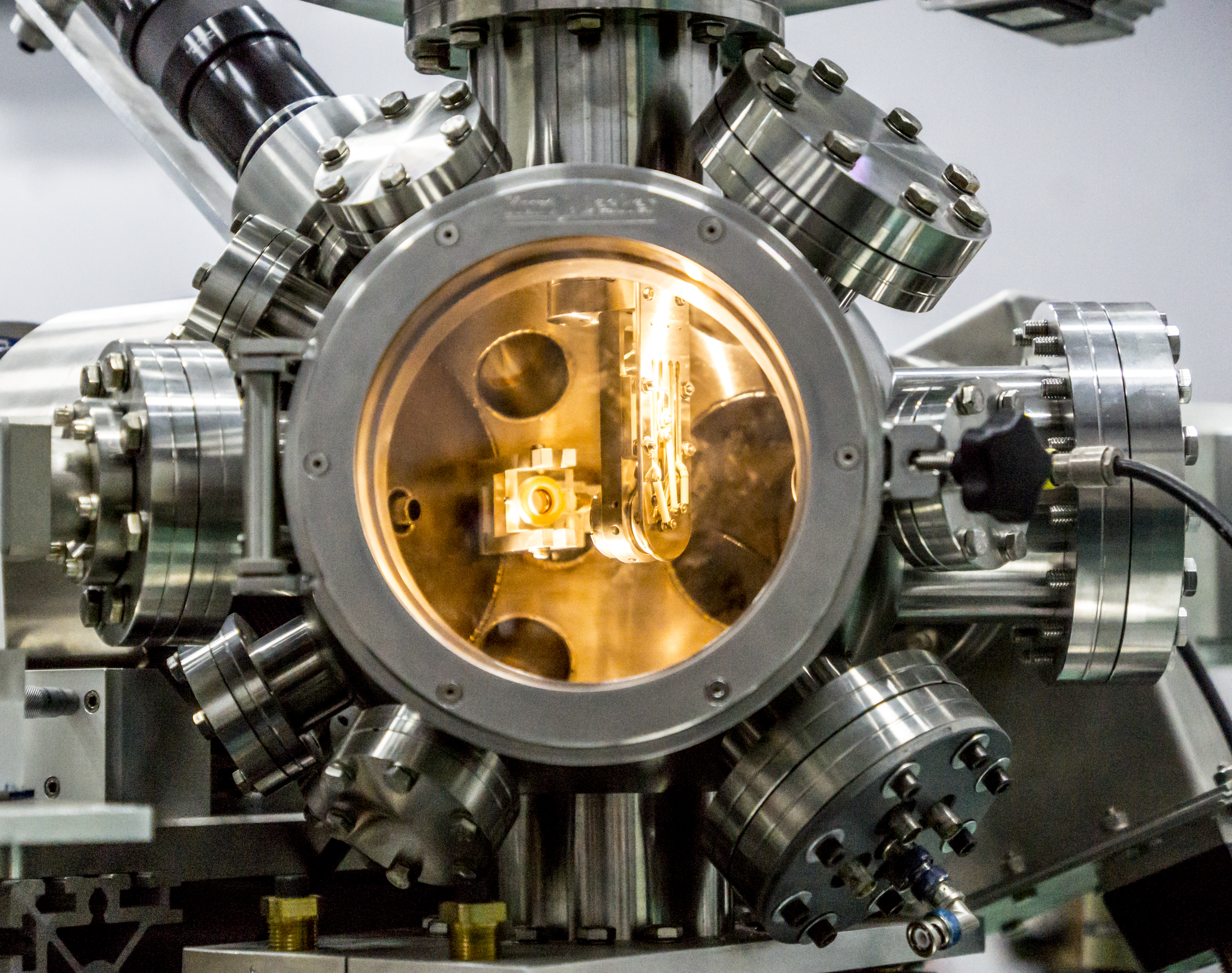
Laboratory of Ion Accelerator

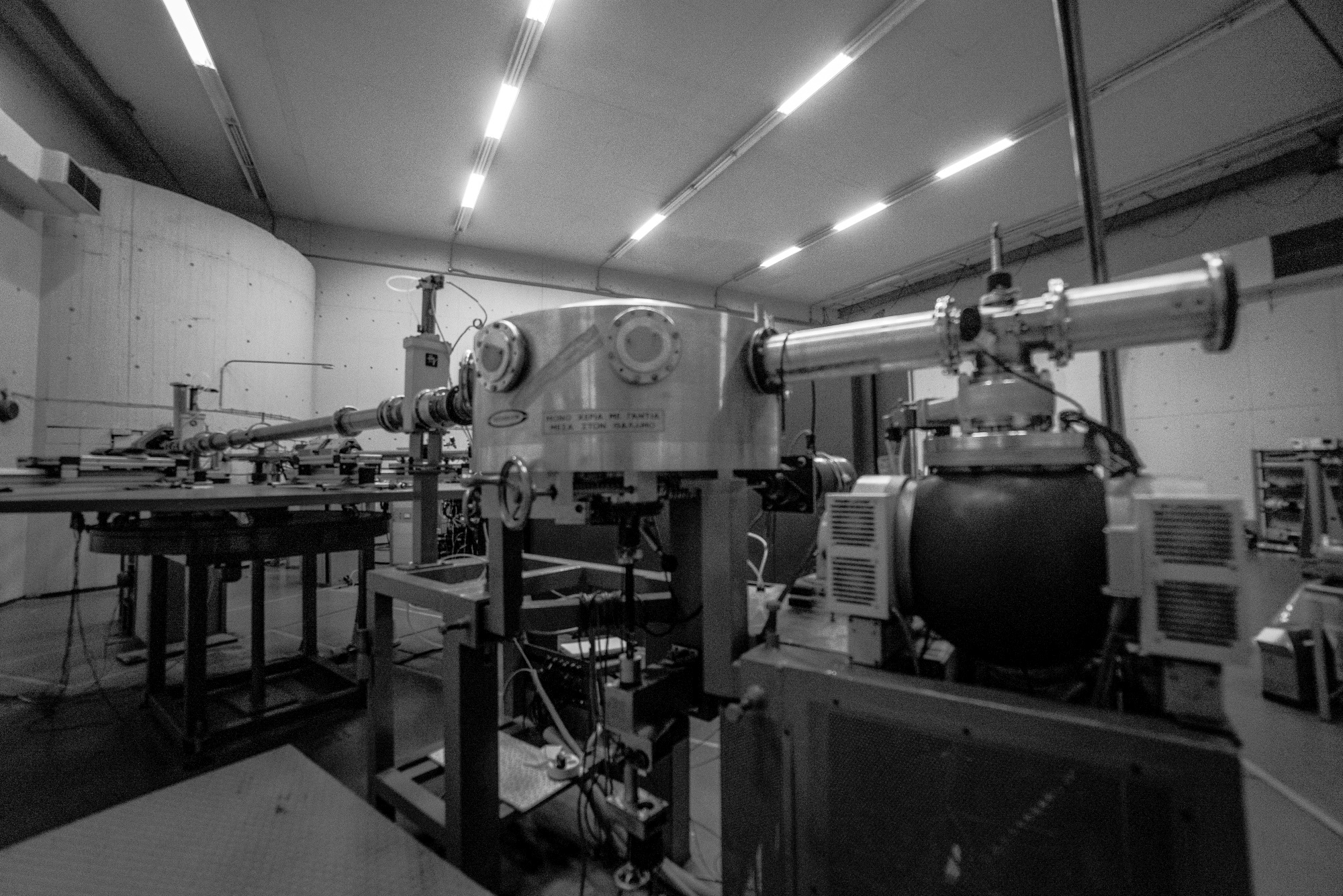
Laboratory of Ion Accelerator

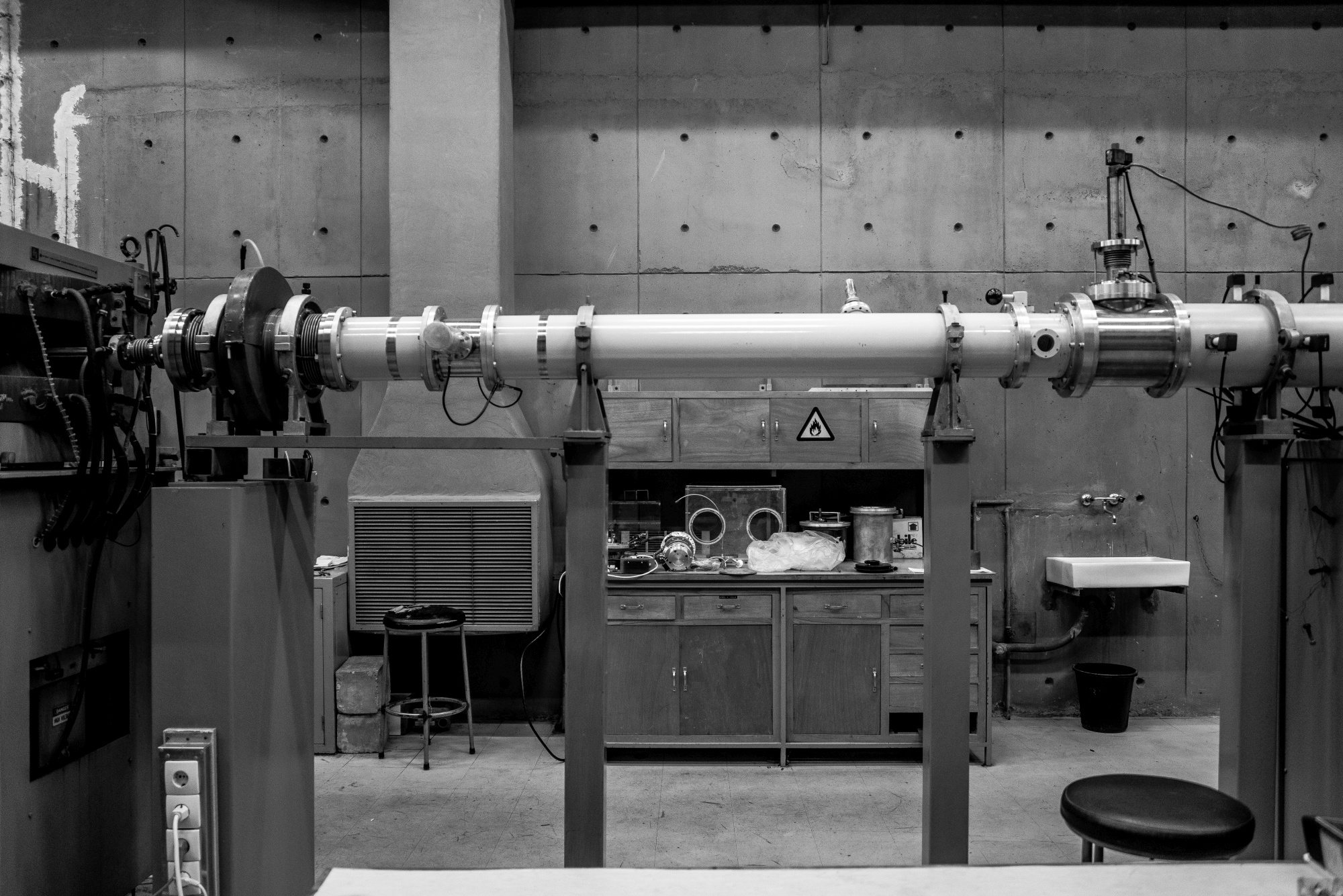
Laboratory of Ion Accelerator

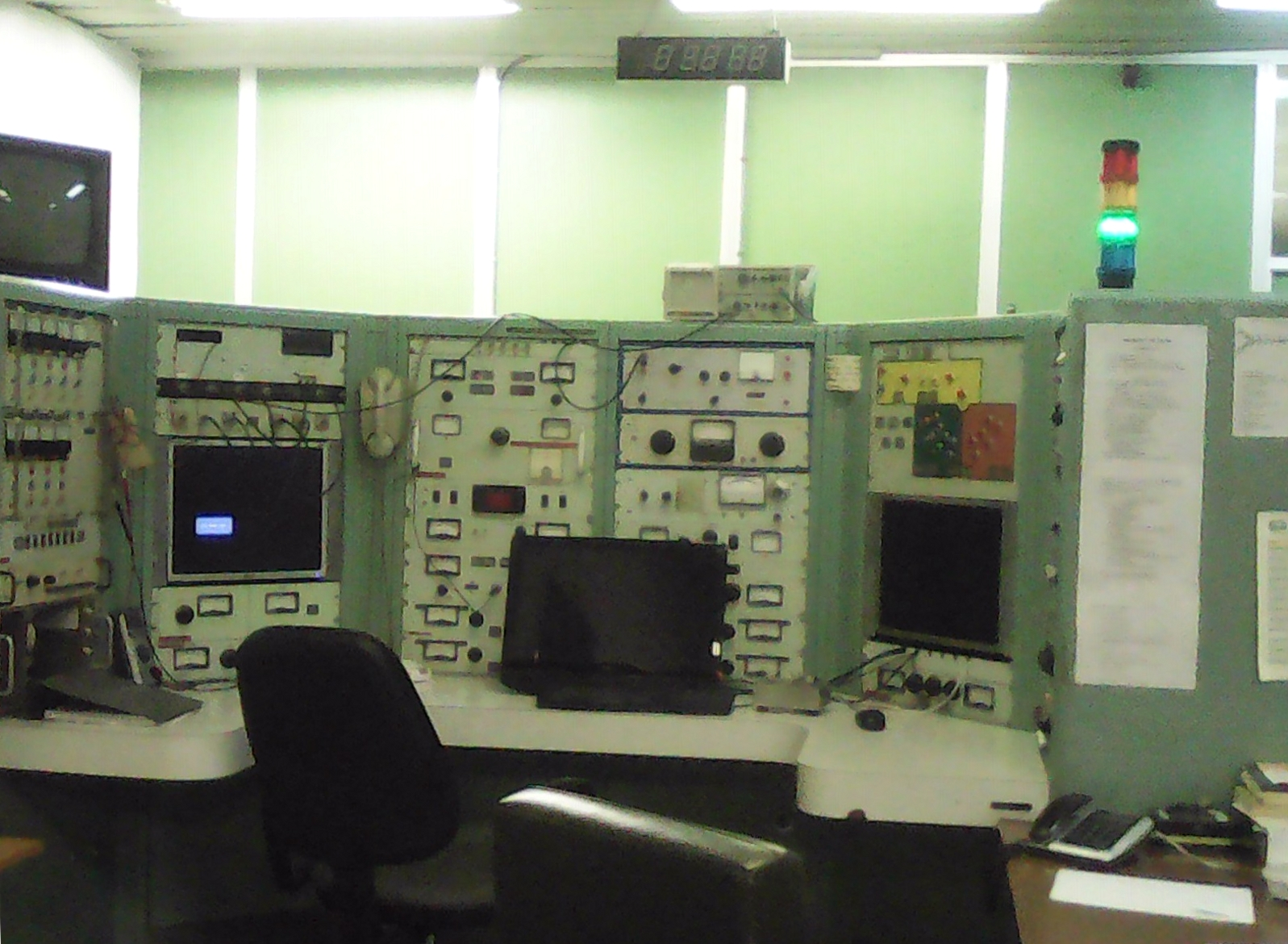
Control panel of Ion Accelerator Tandem

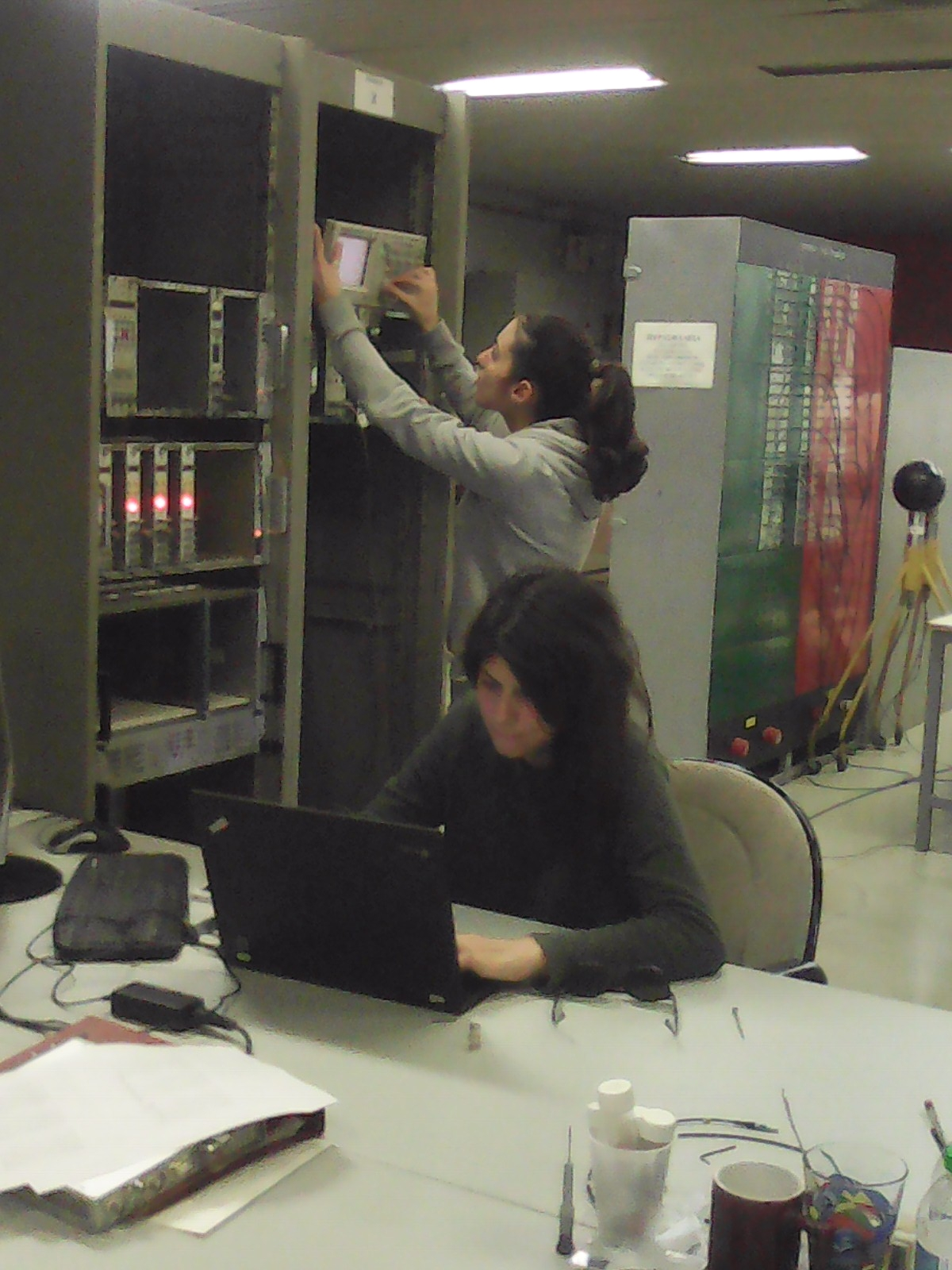
Laboratory of Ion Accelerator Tandem

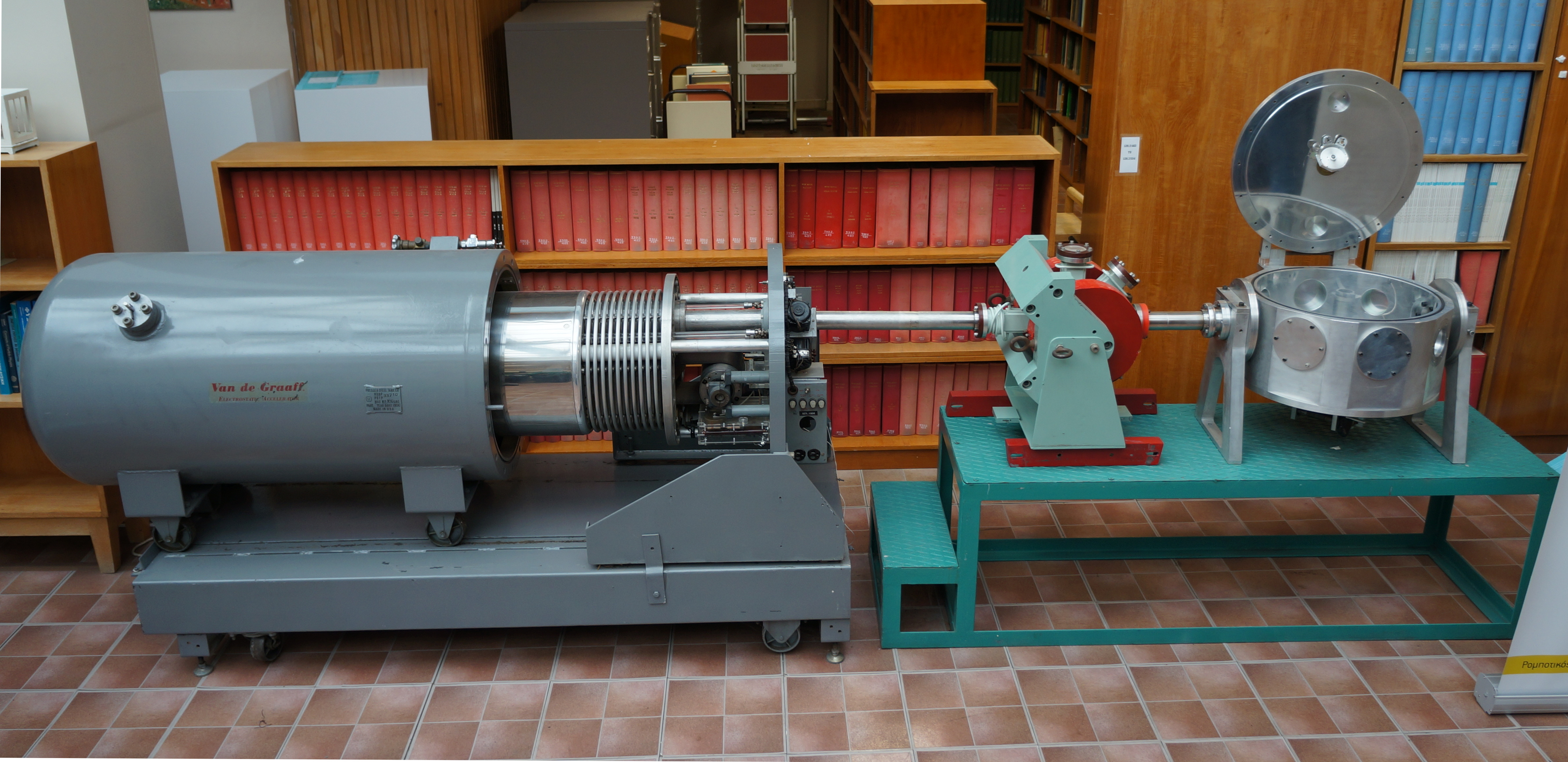
Van de Graf Electrostatic Accelerator

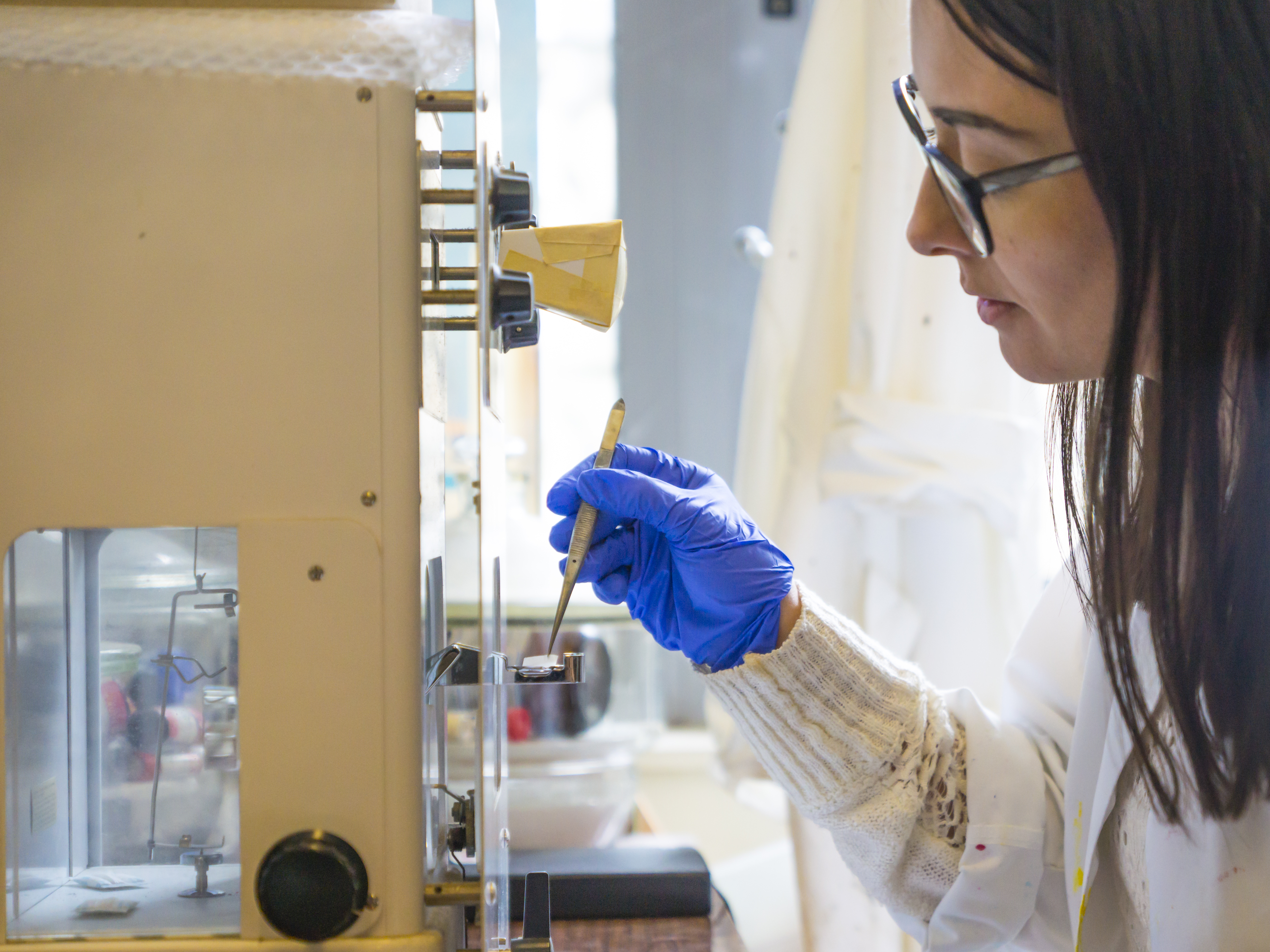
Pathobiology Laboratory-precision weighing instrument

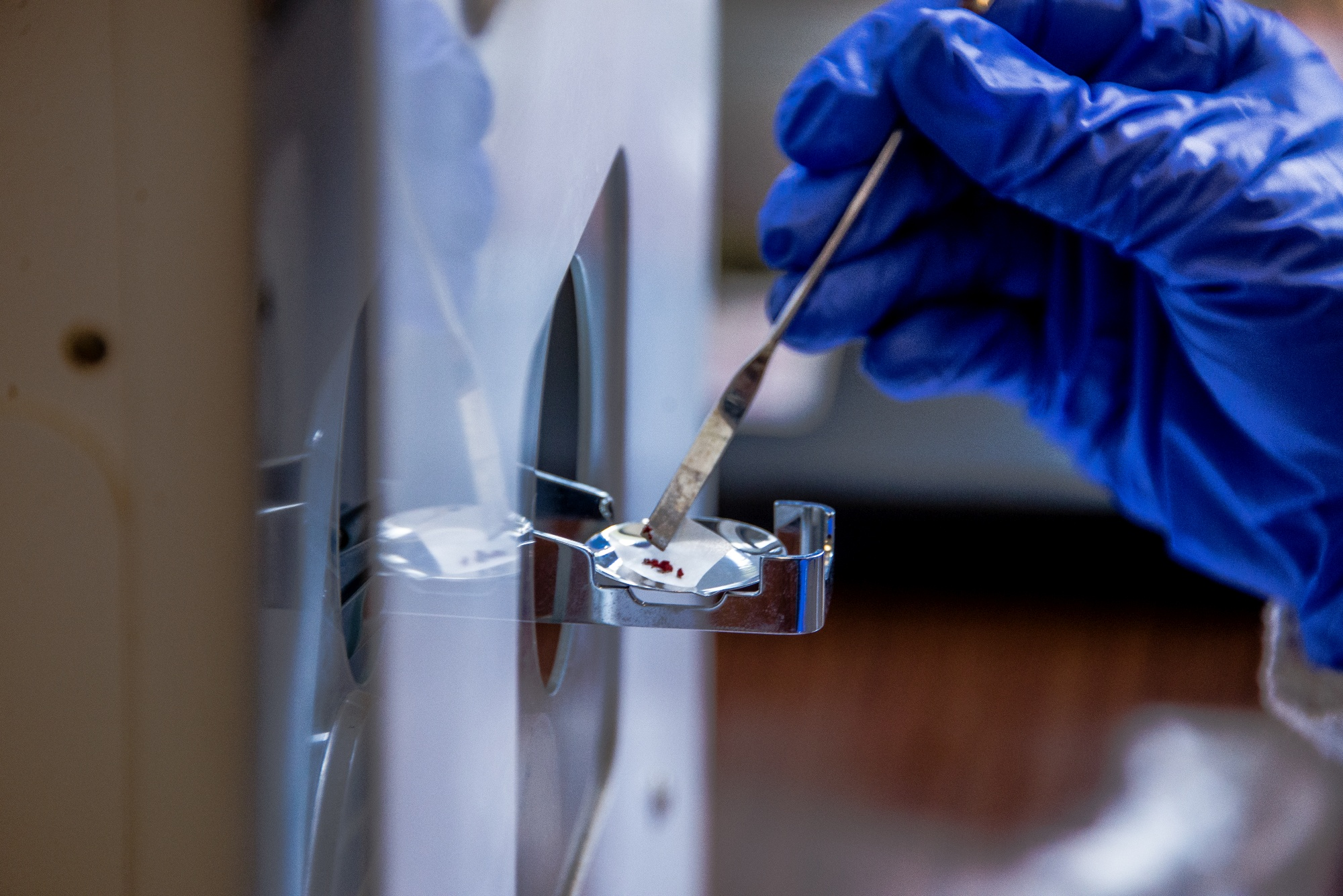
Pathobiology Laboratory-precision weighing instrument

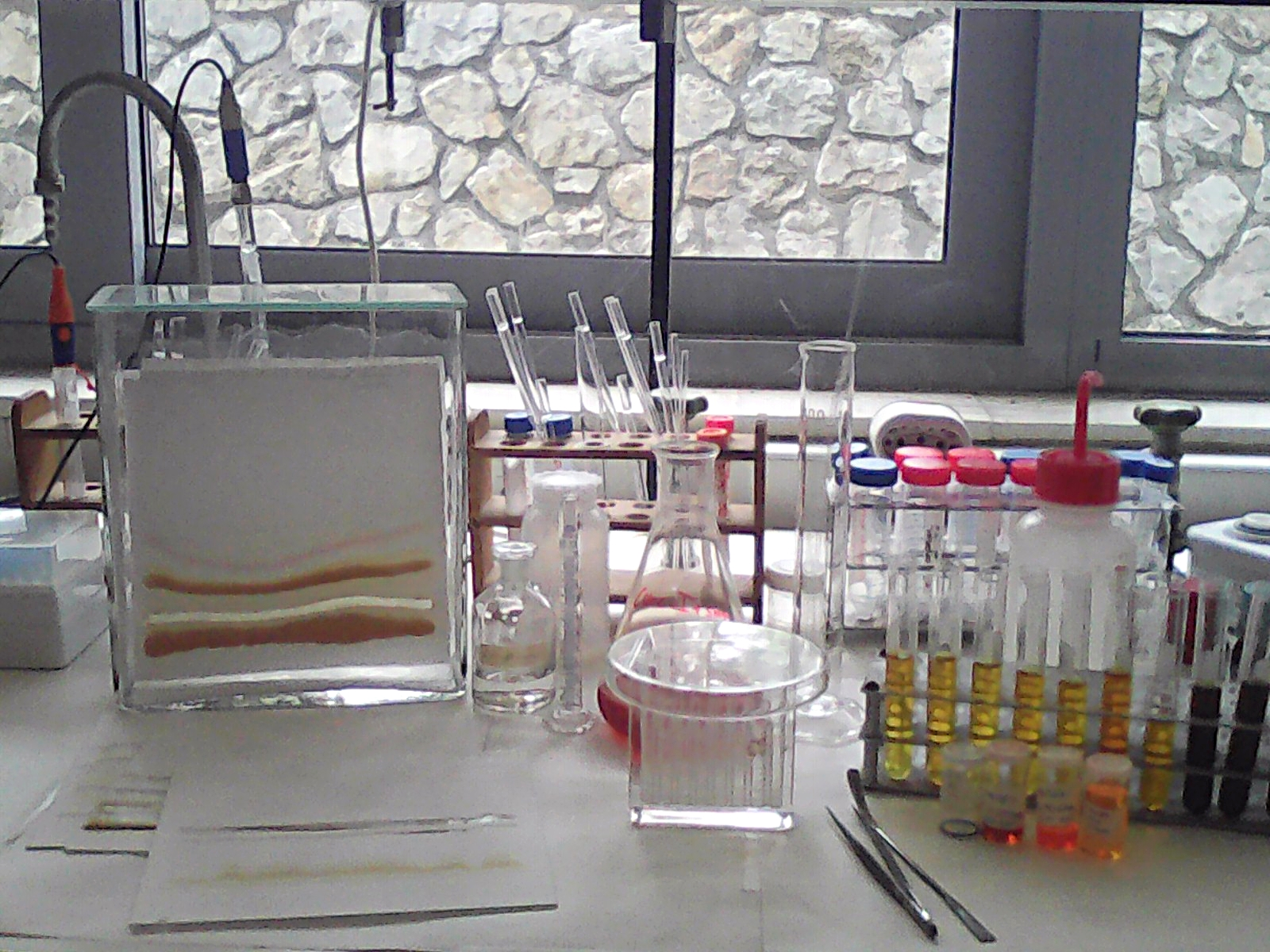
Pathobiology Laboratory

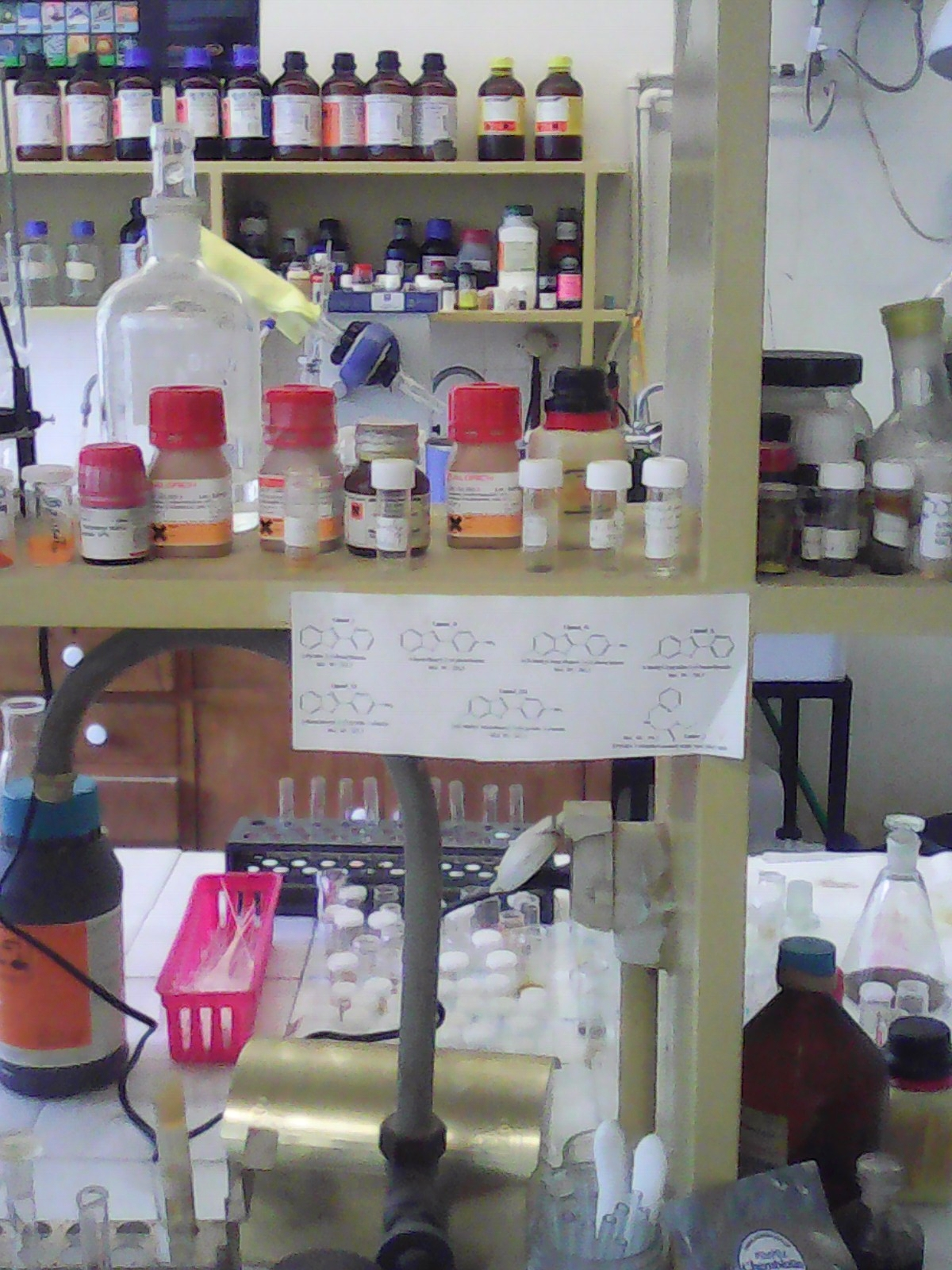
Pathobiology Laboratory

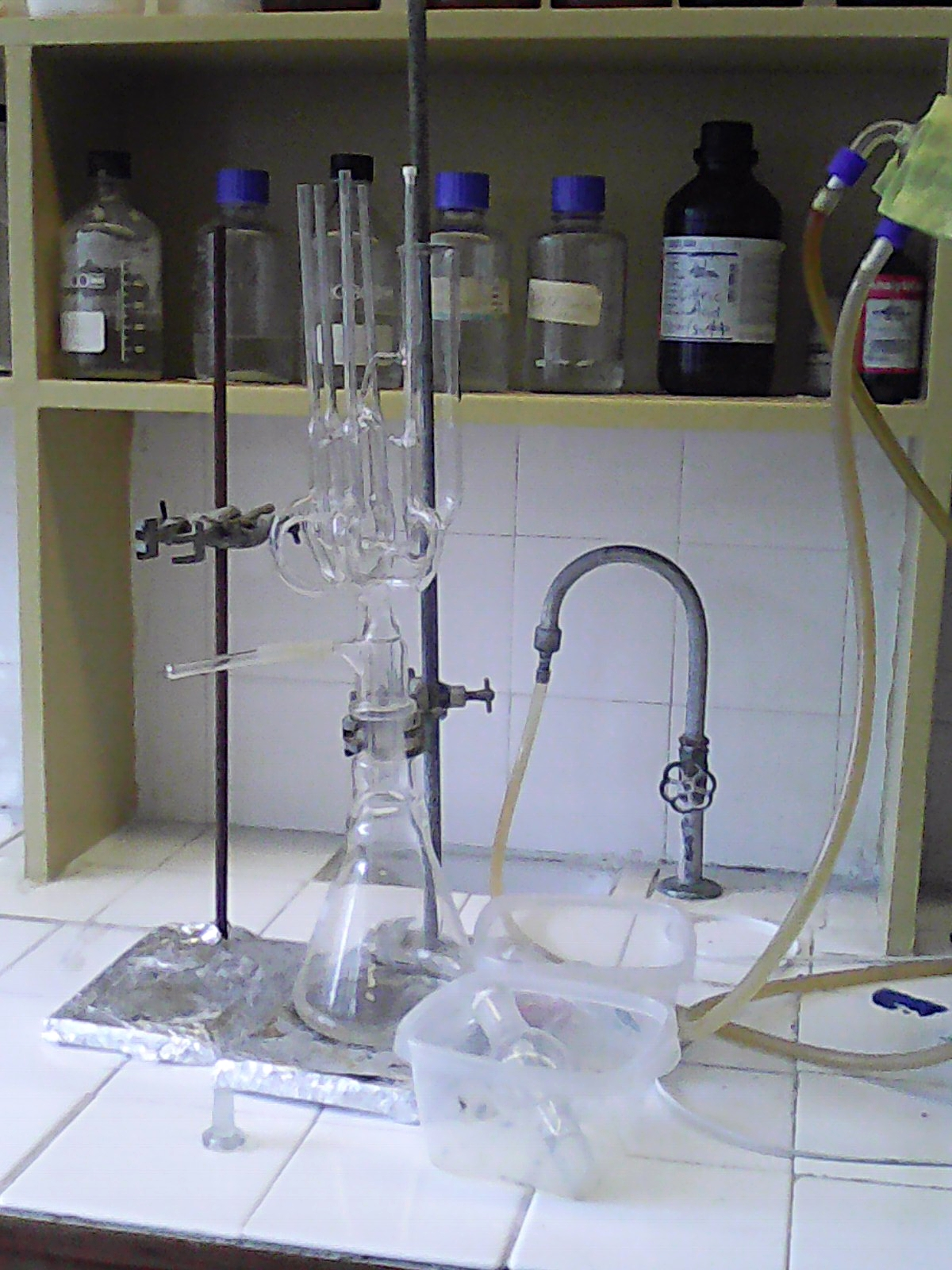
Pathobiology Laboratory

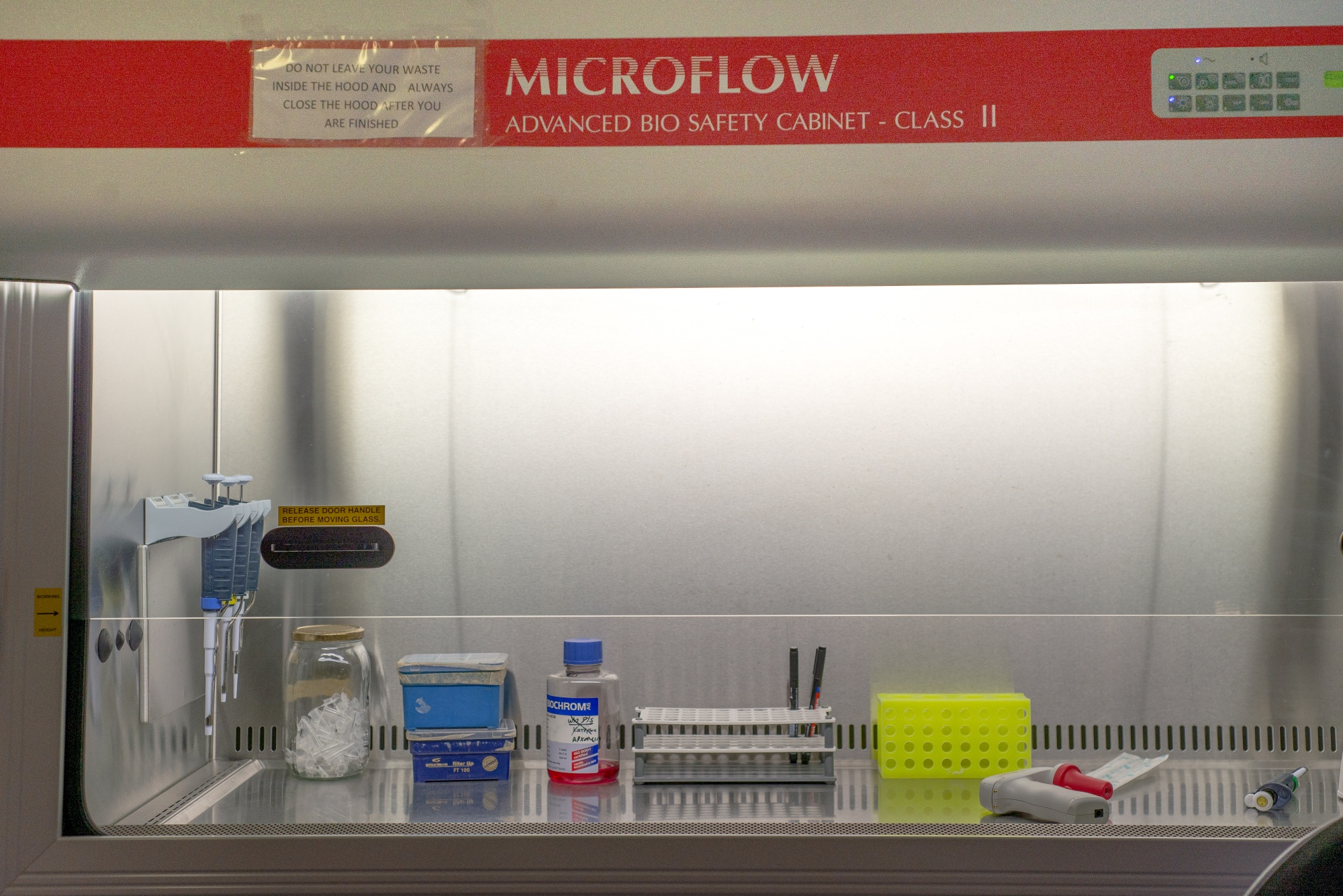
Lab of pathobiology cells and extracellular matrix-Efferent cell culture

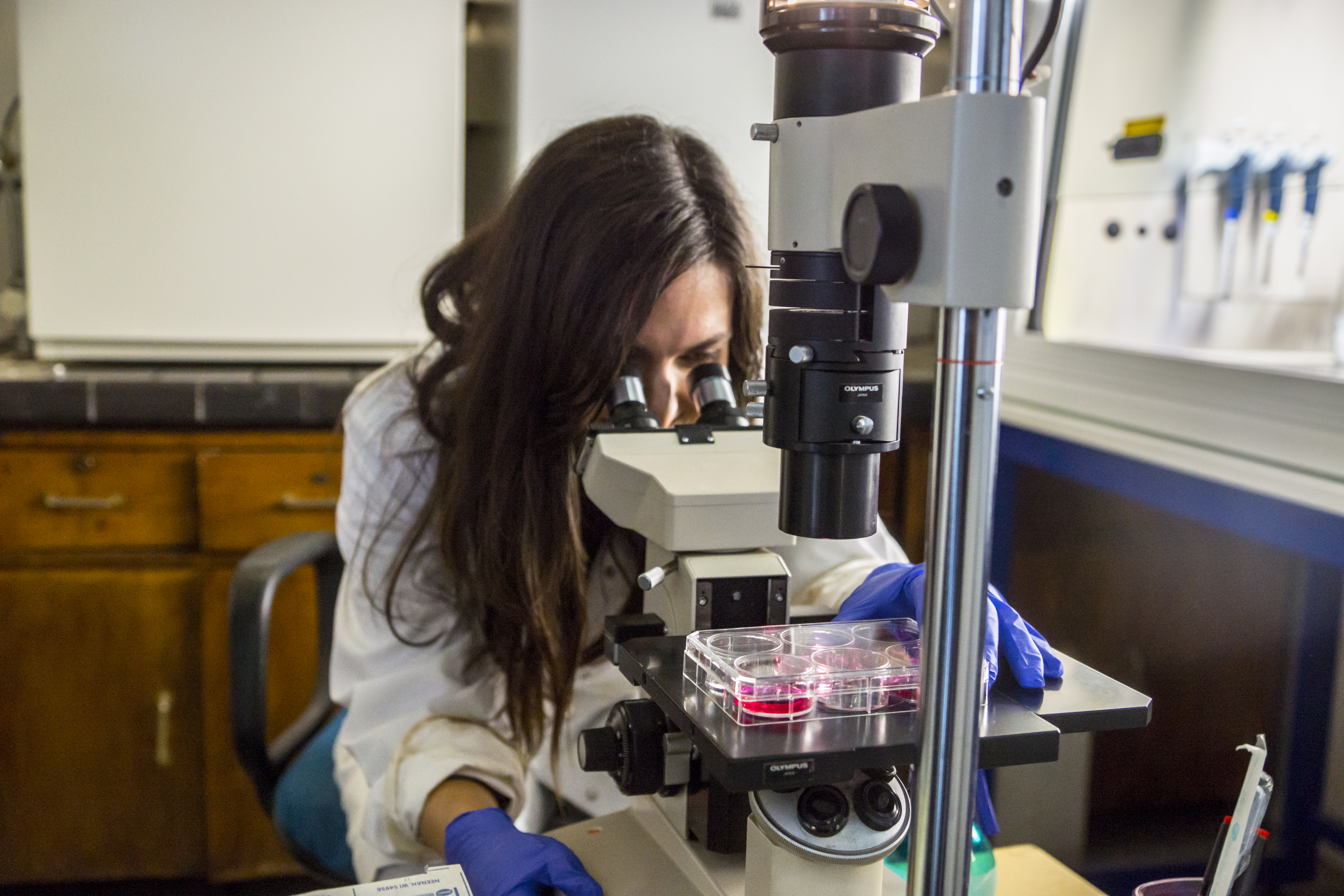
Lab of pathobiology cells and extracellular matrix

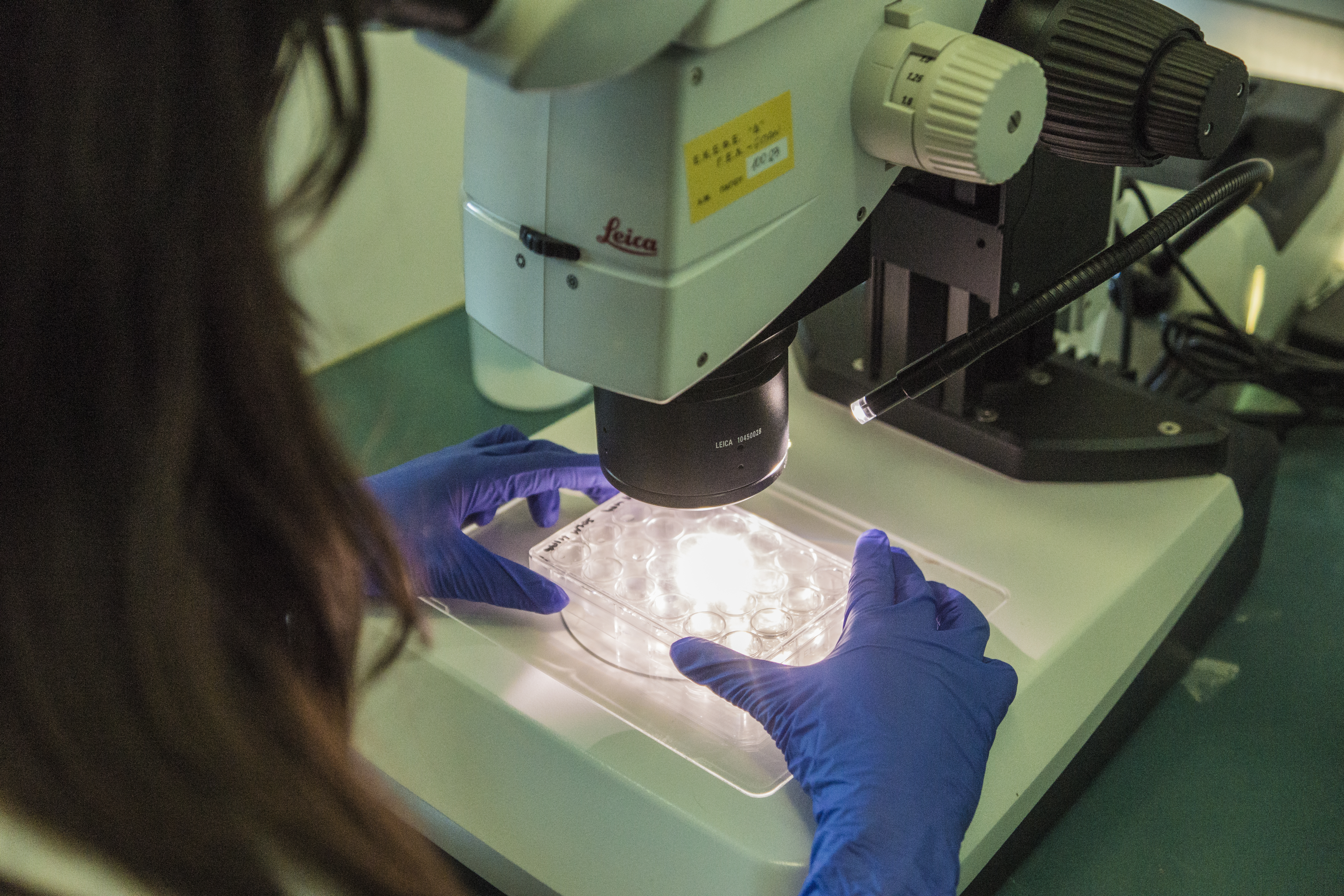
Lab of pathobiology cells and extracellular matrix

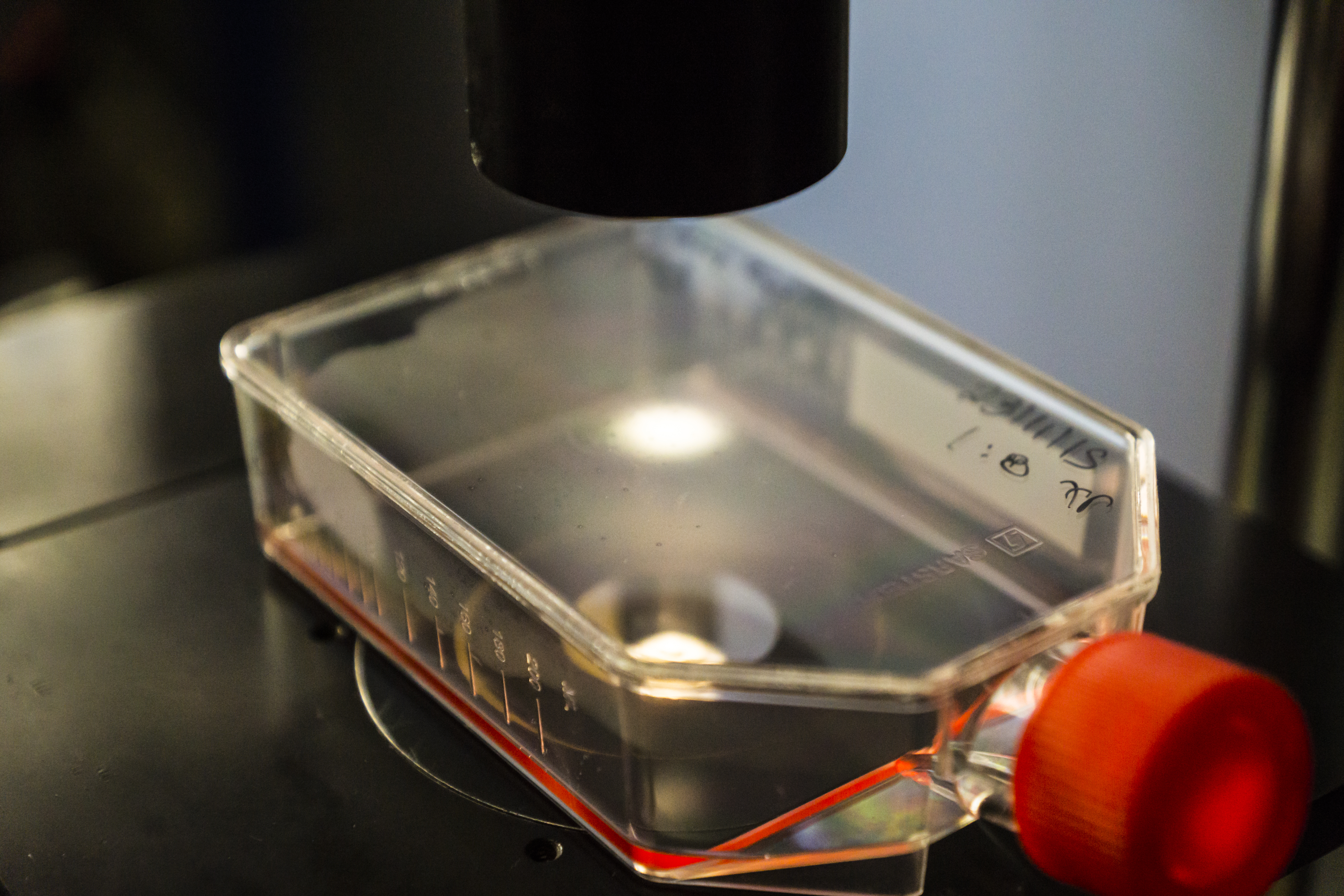
Lab of pathobiology cells and extracellular matrix

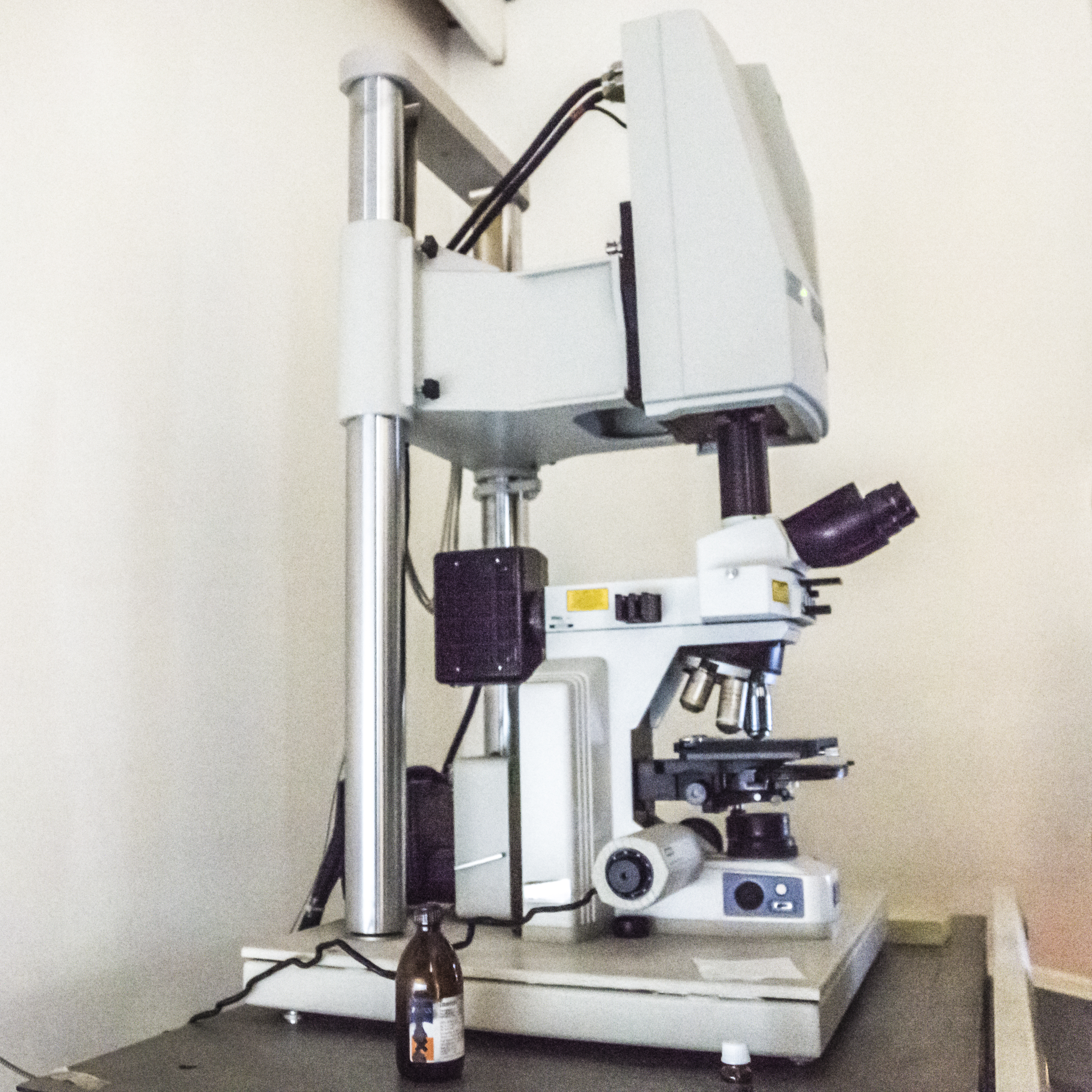
Laboratory of Confocal Microscope

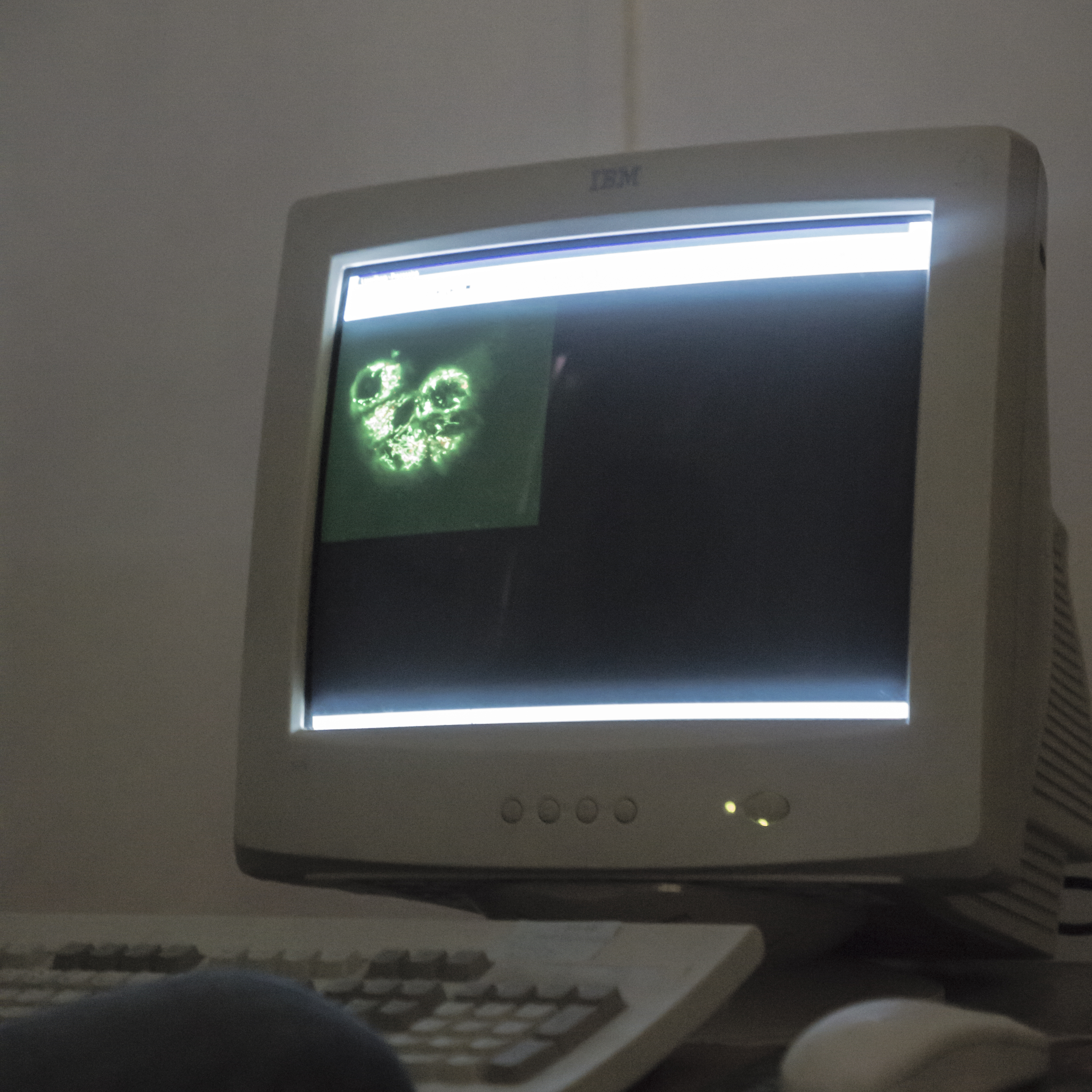
Laboratory of Confocal Microscope

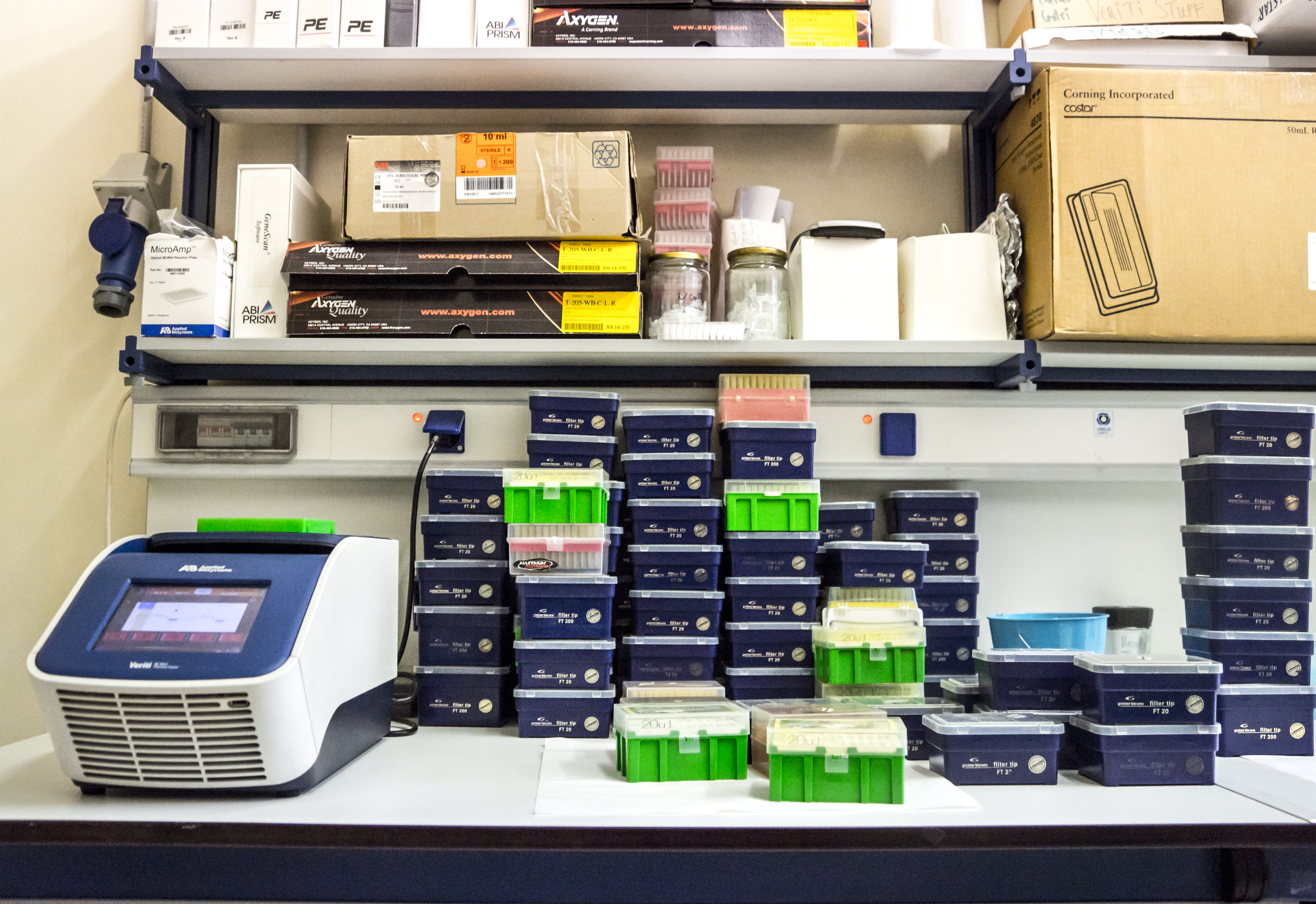
Laboratory of Molecular Diagnostics

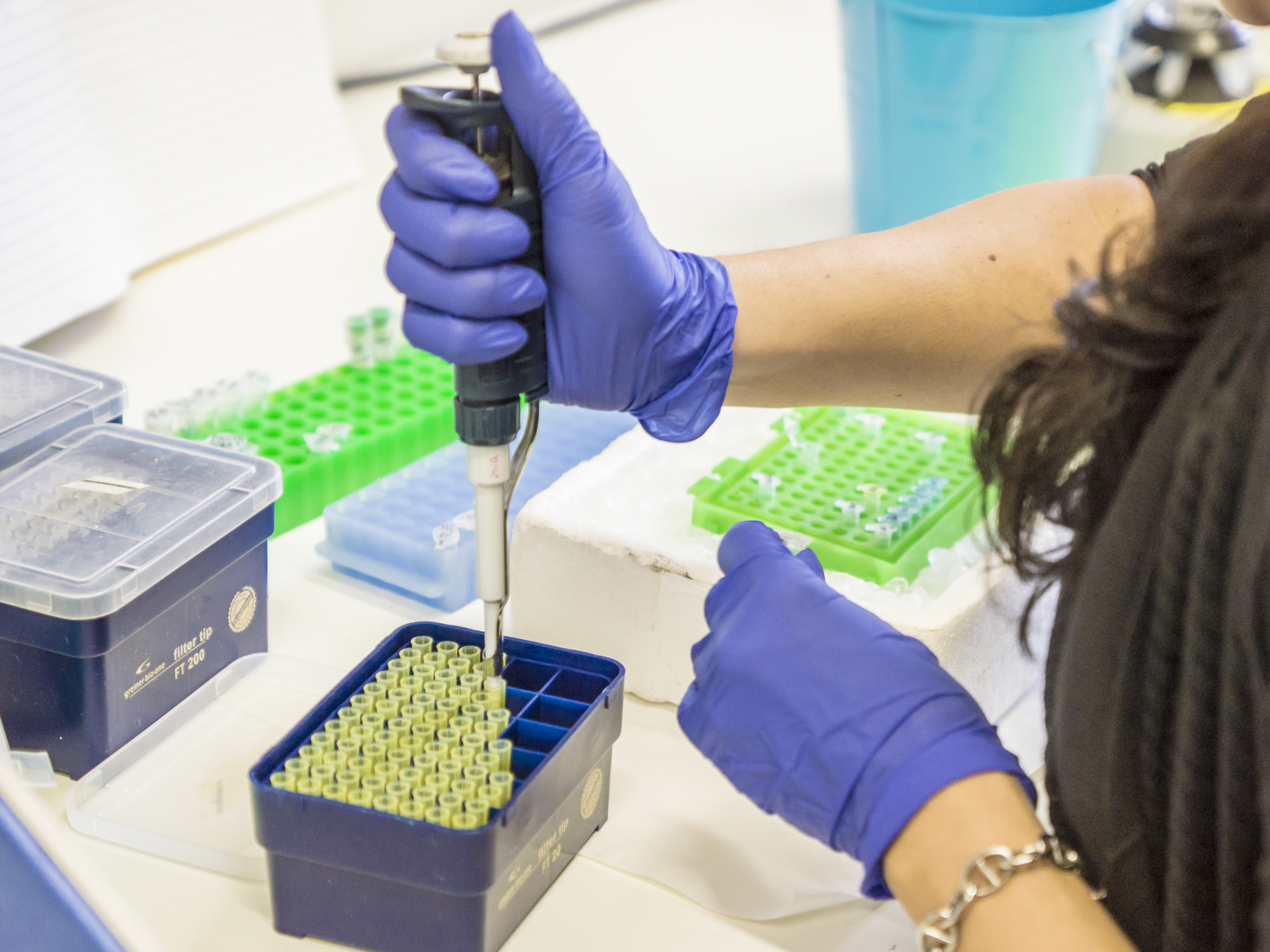
Laboratory of Molecular Diagnostics

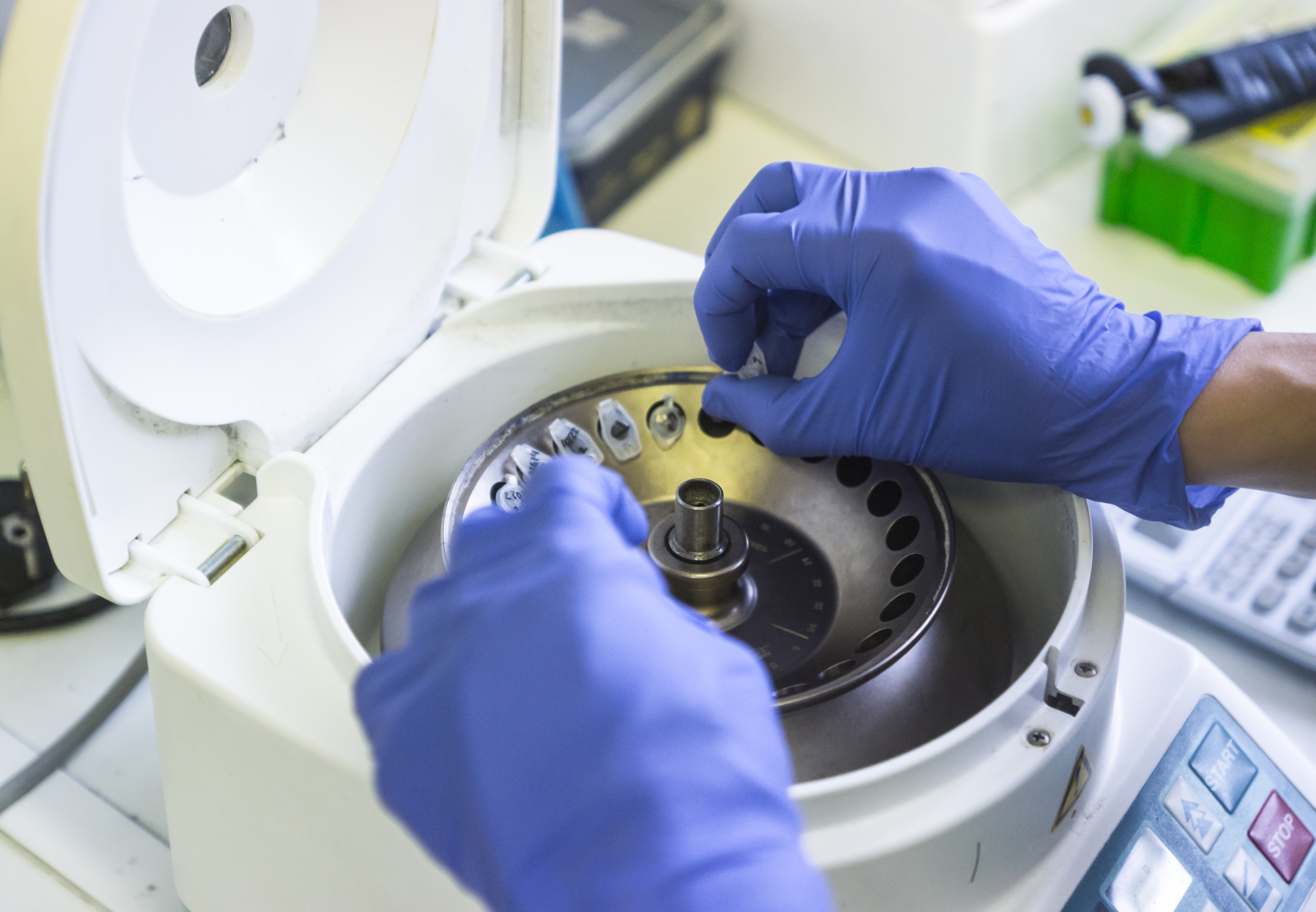
Laboratory of Molecular Diagnostics

== See also ==
- Atmospheric dispersion modelling
- List of atmospheric dispersion models
- Czech Hydrometeorological Institute
- Finnish Meteorological Institute
- List of nuclear reactors
- List of research institutes in Greece
- Met Office, the UK meteorological service
- National Center for Atmospheric Research
- NERI, the National Environmental Research Institute of Denmark
- NILU, the Norwegian Institute for Air Research
- UK Atmospheric Dispersion Modelling Liaison Committee
- UK Dispersion Modelling Bureau
