= Greek Research and Technology Network =

National research and education network of Greece

GRNET
- Formation: 1998
- Type: National research and education network - NREN
- Purpose: To manage the operation and development of Greece's education and research network
- Headquarters: Athens, Greece
- Region served: GREECE
- Website: grnet.gr/en//

The National Infrastructures for Research and Technology Network or GRNET (Greek: Εθνικό Δίκτυο Υποδομών Τεχνολογίας και Έρευνας, ΕΔΥΤΕ) is the national research and education network - NREN of Greece and was formerly named Greek Research and Educational Network. GRNET S.A. provides internet connectivity, e-infrastructure, and other services to the Greek Educational, Academic, and Research community. Additionally, GRNET makes digital applications. It also provides services to the following sectors: Education, Research, Health, Culture. GRNET supports all Universities, Technological Education Institutes, Research Centers, and over 9,500 schools.

The GRNET head office is located in Athens, Greece.

== E-infrastructures and innovative services ==
The GRNET backbone interconnects more than 100 institutions including all universities and technological institutions, research centers, public hospitals, museums, and libraries, as well as the Greek School Network.

GRNET is present in global networking for research and education, representing Greece in GÉANT.

GRNET fiber optic network map showing PoPs and regeneration points

== Large-scale computing services for researchers (cloud computing) ==
GRNET offers cloud computing services that are available via the Infrastructure as a Service model, under the brand name “Okeanos” to promote academic, educational, and research aims. These services are hosted on GRNET's own infrastructure and fall into the category infrastructure as a service (IaaS). More specifically, the following cloud services are provided:

- ~Okeanos: Cloud Service with end users in the academic and research community powered by Synnefo, an IaaS cloud computing project.
- ViMa: Virtual Private Server (VPS) Service provided to GRNET peers for hosting of services.

“~Okeanos” service provides academic users the ability to create a multi-layer virtual infrastructure and instantiate virtual computing machines, local networks, and a storage space inside the virtual machine. The Cloud Computing infrastructure and services of GRNET have been made available to the pan-European R&E community via the “Okeanos-global” service.

== Hellenic high-performance computing infrastructure ==
The GRNET “ARIS” is a national high-performance computing infrastructure providing scientists with additional computational power, storage space, and software (pre-installed compilers, scientific libraries, and popular scientific application suites) to assist the development and execution of scientific applications.

The system went into a pilot operational phase in June 2015, and it is available for research-related use to researchers and scientists across Greek universities, technological institutions, and research centers.

== GR-IX ==
GRNET operates the Greek Internet Exchange (GR-IX). GR-IX interconnects Internet Service Providers, content providers, and other entities and facilitates the exchange of IP traffic among them.

== International activities ==
GRNET participates in international projects funded by the European Union. It also participates in regional and European projects that aim to bridge the digital divide between countries of South-East Europe and the rest of Europe, such as the SEEREN and SEEFIRE projects.

== See also ==
- Communications in Greece
- Internet in Greece
- List of Projects with GRNET Participation
