= Hellenic Telecommunications and Post Commission =

- Εθνική Επιτροπή Τηλεπικοινωνιών και Ταχυδρομείων
- Headquarters of the commission

Agency overview
- Formed: January 1, 1992
- Jurisdiction: Government of Greece
- Headquarters: 60 Kifisias Avenue, Athens; 38°2′39″N 23°48′21″E
- Employees: 217
- Website: www.eett.gr

The Hellenic Telecommunications and Post Commission (Greek: Εθνική Επιτροπή Τηλεπικοινωνιών και Ταχυδρομείων, Ethniki Epitropi Tilepikoinonion kai Tachydromeion) or EETT is a Greek independent authority with administrative and financial autonomy. It acts as the National Regulatory Authority (NRA) in matters of provision of services and networks for electronic communications, related facilities and services, and postal services: Its operation is governed by articles 6 to 11 of Law 4070 (Government Gazette 82/A/2012).

EETT regulates, supervises and monitors:

- The electronic communications market, which is primarily dominated by companies/providers of fixed and/or mobile telephony, wireless communications and Internet.
- The use of the radio frequency spectrum, having, inter alia, the competency to grant, revoke or restrict the usage rights for radio frequencies and the licensing of antenna constructions as well as matters relating to the conditions for placing on the market and use of radio equipment.
- The postal market, in which postal services providers operate.

EETT also operates as competition commission, with all relevant powers and monitoring rights, for the implementation of the national and European legislation regarding competition in the above markets. In this context, EETT ensures the smooth operation of the markets, effectively addressing the risks of distorting competition and defending users’ rights.

== Important milestones in the operation and development of EETT ==
1992	The Hellenic Telecommunications Committee (EET) is established by Law 2075/1992 as an independent state authority with competencies in the field of radio frequency spectrum, the under liberalization market of telecommunications services and activities, including the granting of licences and also the task to ensure compliance with competition rules.
1995	EET starts operating.
1998	EET is assigned the additional competency for the supervision and regulation of the postal services market by Law 2668/1998, which determines the organization and operation of the relevant market. The Authority is renamed to Hellenic Telecommunications and Post Commission (EETT).
2000	Law 2867/2000 strengthens the regulatory, supervisory and monitoring role of EETT in the electronic communications market, now fully liberalized after the abolition of OTE’s exclusive rights and legal monopoly on the fixed (voice) telephony and fixed telephone network.
2003	EETT’s competencies in the postal market are strengthened by amendment of Law 2668/1998. The new framework is defined by Law 3185/2003 on the gradual opening of the postal market to competition and the strengthening of EETT’s responsibilities in this market.
2006	The framework for the provision of electronic communications networks and services and related facilities is set out, and EETT’s competencies are expanded. The new framework is defined by Law 3431/2006 on electronic communications, which incorporates more recent European regulations.
2012	EETT’s competencies are extended, as provided for by Laws 4070/2012 and 4053/2012, regarding the responsibility of managing the radio frequency spectrum for terrestrial digital broadcasting services and ensuring greater transparency and efficiency, in matters such as the licensing of antenna constructions, market analysis and consumer protection.
2020	Law 4727/2020 incorporates the European Electronic Communications Code, as established with Directive (EU) 2018/1972 into the Greek legislation. The Code updates and replaces the existing package of directives regarding the regulation of the sector. On this basis, Law 4727/2012 replaces most of Law 4070/2012.

== EETT's logo ==
EETT's logo is a white network map on a red background symbolizing "the tree of communication". The older logos featured styled versions of the EETT lettering combined with a globe or a satellite pointing upwards. The "tree" logo was introduced in the first quarter of 2005.

== See also ==
- The official website of EETT (in Greek and English)
