= Outline of Estonia =

Country in the Baltic region in Northern Europe

The Flag of Estonia

The Coat of arms of Estonia

The location of Estonia

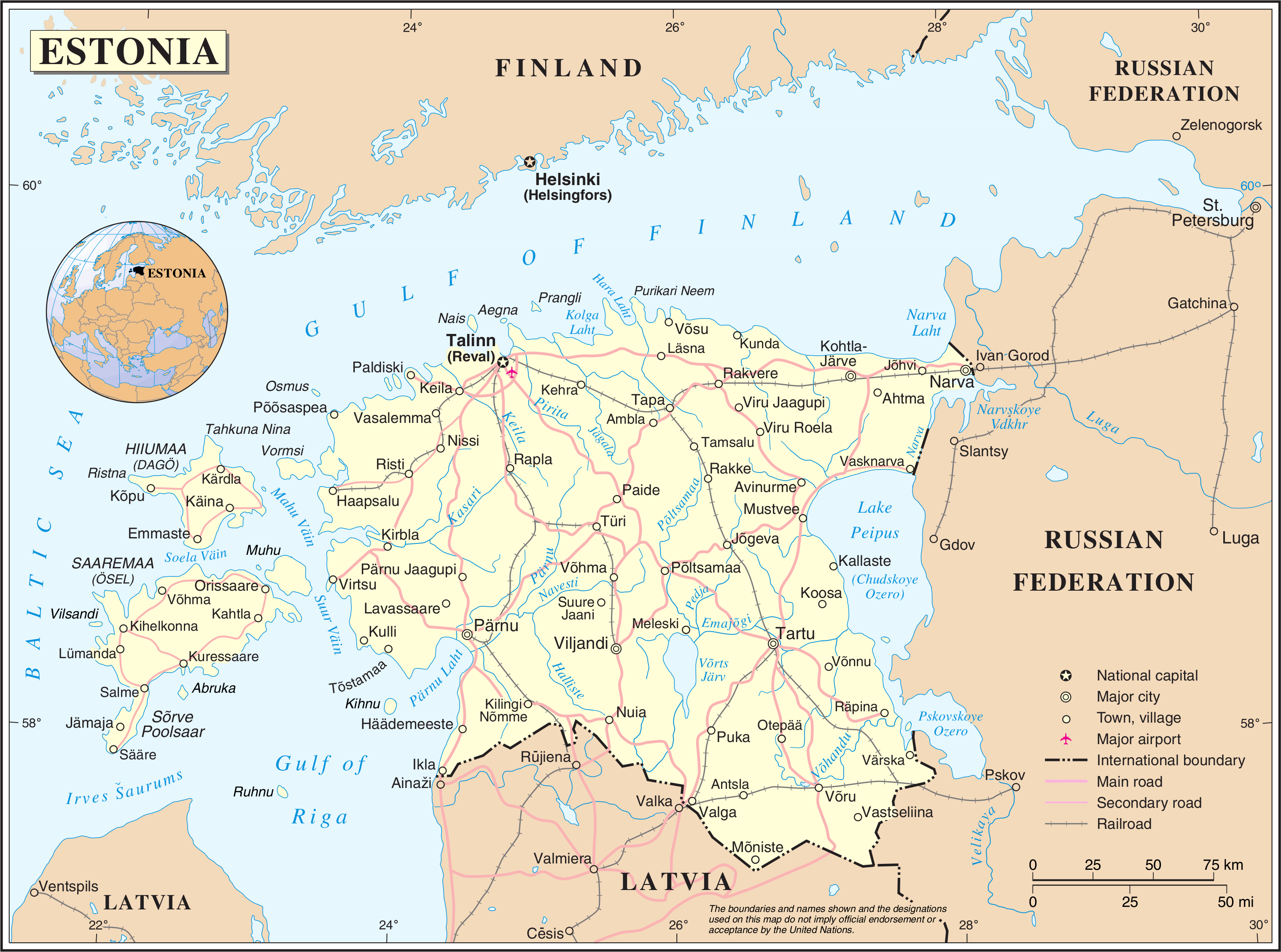
An enlargeable map of the Republic of Estonia

The following outline is provided as an overview of and topical guide to Estonia:

Estonia – state of 1.29 million people in the Baltic region of Northern Europe. It is bordered to the north by the Gulf of Finland, to the west by the Baltic Sea, to the south by Latvia (343 km), and to the east by Lake Peipus and Russia (338.6 km). Across the Baltic Sea lies Sweden in the west and Finland in the north. The territory of Estonia covers 45,227 km^{2} (17,462 sq mi), and is influenced by a temperate seasonal climate. The Estonians are a Balto-Finnic people, and the official language, Estonian, is a Balto-Finnic language closely related to Finnish and distantly to Hungarian.

== General reference ==
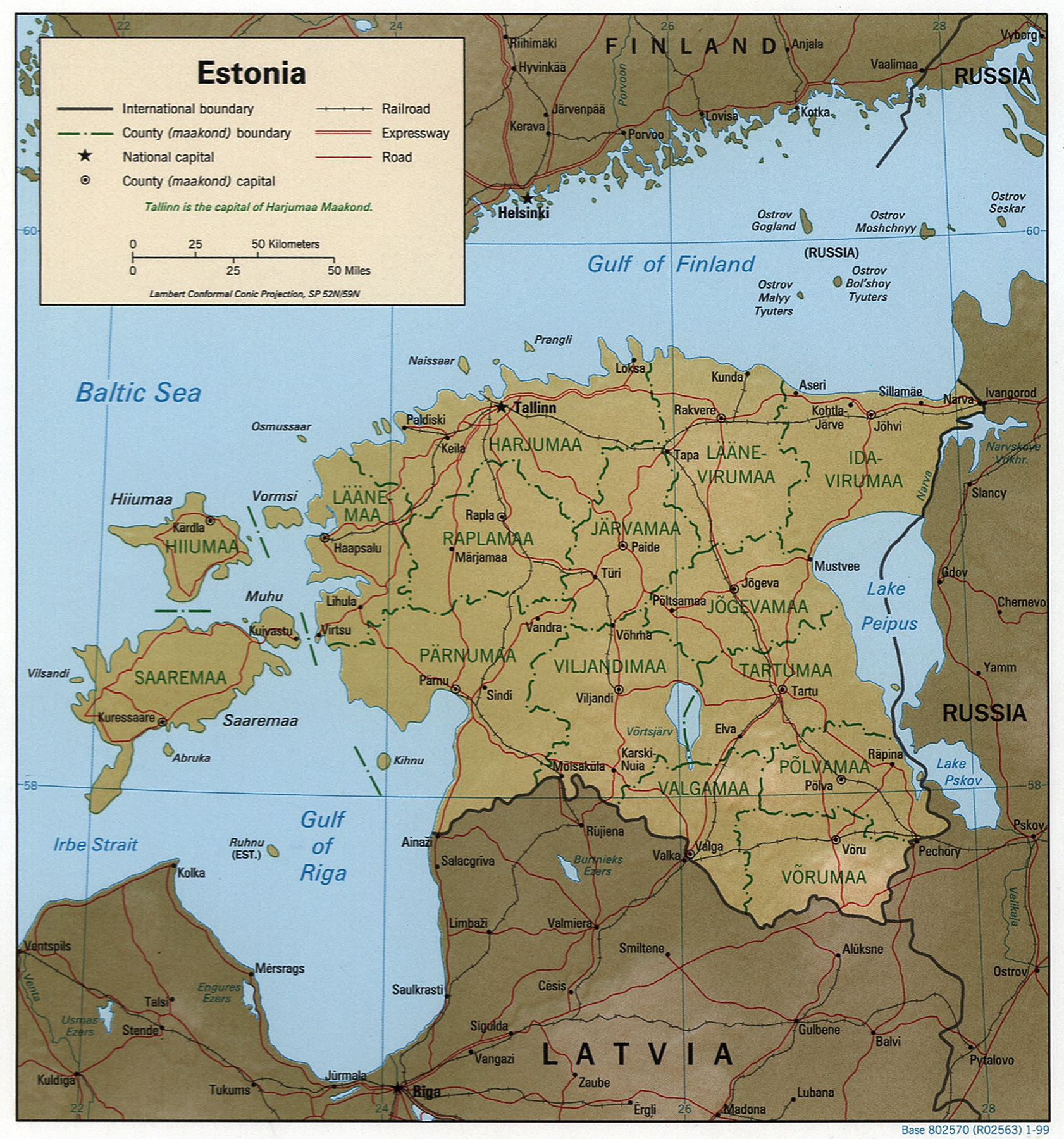
An enlargeable relief map of Estonia

- Pronunciation: /ɛˈstoʊniə/
- Common English country name: Estonia
- Official English country name: The Republic of Estonia
- Common endonym(s): Eesti, Eestimaa
- Official endonym(s): Eesti Vabariik
- Adjectival(s): Estonian
- Demonym(s): Estonians
- Etymology: Name of Estonia
- International rankings of Estonia
- ISO country codes: EE, EST, 233
- ISO region codes: See ISO 3166-2:EE
- Internet country code top-level domain: .ee

== Geography of Estonia ==
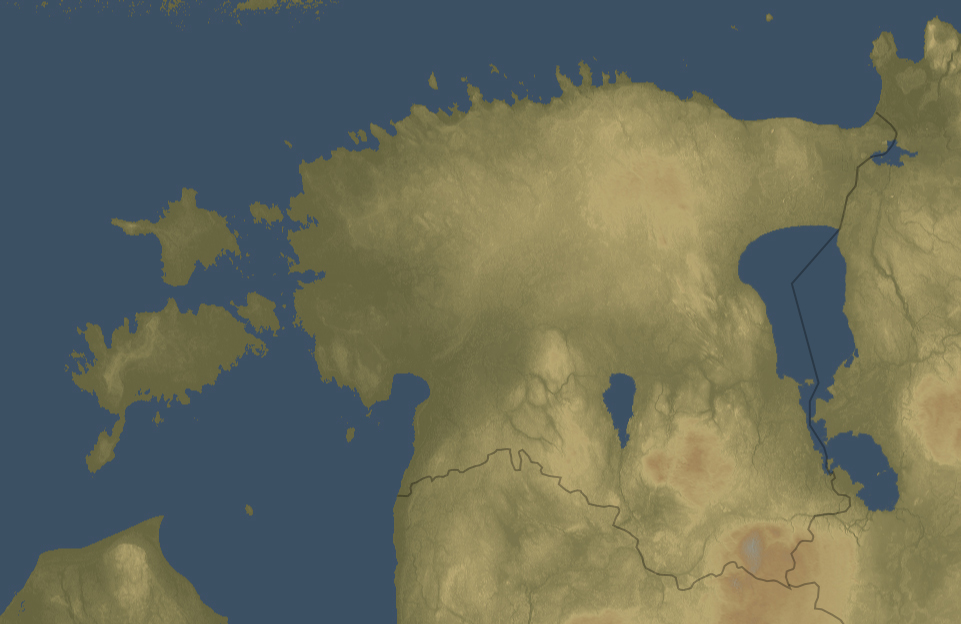
An enlargeable topographic map of Estonia

Geography of Estonia

- Estonia is:
  - a country
  - a member State of the European Union
  - a member state of NATO
- Location:
  - Northern Hemisphere and Eastern Hemisphere
  - Eurasia
    - Europe
      - Northern Europe
      - Eastern Europe
  - Time zone: Eastern European Time (UTC+02), Eastern European Summer Time (UTC+03)
  - Extreme points of Estonia
    - High: Suur Munamägi 318 m (1,043 ft)
    - Low: Baltic Sea 0 m
  - Land boundaries: 633 km

Latvia 343 km
Russia 290 km

- Coastline: Baltic Sea 3,794 km

- Population of Estonia: 1,340,600 (January 1, 2008) - 152nd most populous country
- Area of Estonia: 45,228 km^{2}
- Atlas of Estonia

=== Environment of Estonia ===
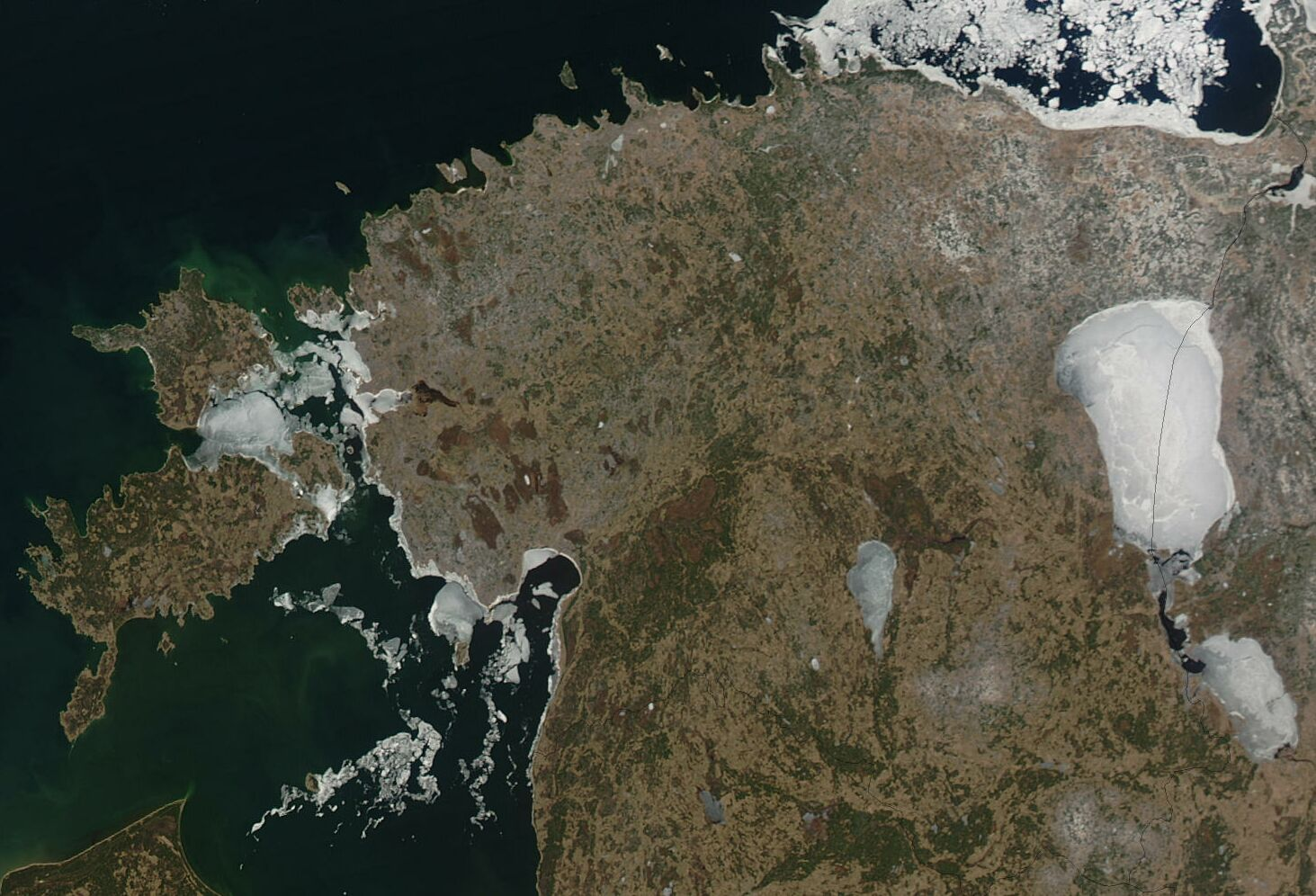
An enlargeable satellite image of Estonia

- Climate of Estonia
- Renewable energy in Estonia
- Geology of Estonia
- Protected areas of Estonia
  - National parks of Estonia
- Fauna of Estonia
  - Birds of Estonia
  - Mammals of Estonia

==== Natural geographic features of Estonia ====
- Glaciers of Estonia — none
- Islands of Estonia
- Lakes of Estonia
- Mountains of Estonia
  - Volcanoes in Estonia — none
- Rivers of Estonia
  - Waterfalls of Estonia
- Valleys of Estonia
- World Heritage Sites in Estonia

=== Regions of Estonia ===
==== Administrative divisions of Estonia ====
Administrative divisions of Estonia

- Counties of Estonia
  - Municipalities of Estonia

===== Counties of Estonia =====
Counties of Estonia

===== Municipalities of Estonia =====
Municipalities of Estonia

- Capital of Estonia: Tallinn
- Cities of Estonia

=== Demography of Estonia ===
Demographics of Estonia

== Government and politics of Estonia ==
Politics of Estonia

- Form of government: parliamentary representative democratic republic
- Capital of Estonia: Tallinn
- Elections in Estonia
- Political parties in Estonia
- Taxation in Estonia

=== Branches of the government of Estonia ===
Government of Estonia

==== Executive branch of the government of Estonia ====
- Head of state: President of Estonia, Alar Karis
- Head of government: Prime Minister of Estonia, Kristen Michal
- Cabinet of Estonia

==== Legislative branch of the government of Estonia ====
- Parliament of Estonia

==== Judicial branch of the government of Estonia ====
Court system of Estonia

- Supreme Court of Estonia

=== Foreign relations of Estonia ===
Foreign relations of Estonia

- Diplomatic missions in Estonia
- Diplomatic missions of Estonia

==== International organization membership ====
The Republic of Estonia is a member of:

- Australia Group
- Baltic Assembly (BA)
- Bank for International Settlements (BIS)
- Council of Europe (CE)
- Council of the Baltic Sea States (CBSS)
- Euro-Atlantic Partnership Council (EAPC)
- European Bank for Reconstruction and Development (EBRD)
- European Investment Bank (EIB)
- European Union (EU)
- Food and Agriculture Organization (FAO)
- International Atomic Energy Agency (IAEA)
- International Bank for Reconstruction and Development (IBRD)
- International Civil Aviation Organization (ICAO)
- International Criminal Court (ICCt)
- International Criminal Police Organization (Interpol)
- International Development Association (IDA)
- International Federation of Red Cross and Red Crescent Societies (IFRCS)
- International Finance Corporation (IFC)
- International Hydrographic Organization (IHO)
- International Labour Organization (ILO)
- International Maritime Organization (IMO)
- International Monetary Fund (IMF)
- International Olympic Committee (IOC)
- International Organization for Migration (IOM)
- International Organization for Standardization (ISO) (correspondent)
- International Red Cross and Red Crescent Movement (ICRM)
- International Telecommunication Union (ITU)
- International Trade Union Confederation (ITUC)
- Inter-Parliamentary Union (IPU)
- Multilateral Investment Guarantee Agency (MIGA)
- Nordic Investment Bank (NIB)
- North Atlantic Treaty Organization (NATO)
- Nuclear Suppliers Group (NSG)
- Organisation for Economic Co-operation and Development (OECD) (accession state)
- Organization for Security and Cooperation in Europe (OSCE)
- Organisation for the Prohibition of Chemical Weapons (OPCW)
- Organisation internationale de la Francophonie (OIF) (observer)
- Organization of American States (OAS) (observer)
- Permanent Court of Arbitration (PCA)
- Schengen Convention
- United Nations (UN)
- United Nations Conference on Trade and Development (UNCTAD)
- United Nations Educational, Scientific, and Cultural Organization (UNESCO)
- United Nations High Commissioner for Refugees (UNHCR)
- United Nations Institute for Training and Research (UNITAR)
- United Nations Truce Supervision Organization (UNTSO)
- Universal Postal Union (UPU)
- Western European Union (WEU) (associate partner)
- World Customs Organization (WCO)
- World Federation of Trade Unions (WFTU)
- World Health Organization (WHO)
- World Intellectual Property Organization (WIPO)
- World Meteorological Organization (WMO)
- World Trade Organization (WTO)
- World Veterans Federation
- Zangger Committee (ZC) (permanent observer)

=== Law and order in Estonia ===
Law of Estonia

- Capital punishment in Estonia
- Constitution of Estonia
- Crime in Estonia
- Human rights in Estonia
  - LGBT rights in Estonia
  - Freedom of religion in Estonia
- Law enforcement in Estonia

=== Military of Estonia ===
Military of Estonia

- Command
  - Commander-in-chief: Major General Andrus Merilo
    - Ministry of Defence of Estonia
- Forces
  - Army of Estonia
  - Navy of Estonia
  - Air Force of Estonia
  - Special forces of Estonia
- Military history of Estonia
- Military ranks of Estonia

=== Local government in Estonia ===
Local government in Estonia

== History of Estonia ==
History of Estonia

- Timeline of the history of Estonia
- Military history of Estonia

== Culture of Estonia ==
Culture of Estonia

- Architecture of Estonia
  - Estonian vernacular architecture
- Cuisine of Estonia
- Festivals in Estonia
- Languages of Estonia
- Media in Estonia
- Museums in Estonia
- National symbols of Estonia
  - Coat of arms of Estonia
  - Flag of Estonia
  - National anthem of Estonia
- People of Estonia
  - Estonian Jews
  - Estonian Swedes
  - Estonian Russians
  - Baltic Germans
- Prostitution in Estonia
- Public holidays in Estonia
- Religion in Estonia
  - Buddhism in Estonia
  - Christianity in Estonia
    - Estonian Evangelical Lutheran Church
    - Roman Catholicism in Estonia
    - Estonian Apostolic Orthodox Church
    - Estonian Orthodox Church of Moscow Patriarchate
  - Hinduism in Estonia
  - Islam in Estonia
  - Judaism in Estonia
- World Heritage Sites in Estonia

=== Art in Estonia ===
- Art in Estonia
- Cinema of Estonia
- Literature of Estonia
- Music of Estonia
- Television in Estonia
- Theatre in Estonia

=== Sport in Estonia ===
Sport in Estonia

- Football in Estonia
- Estonia at the Olympics

== Economy and infrastructure of Estonia ==
Economy of Estonia

- Economic rank, by nominal GDP (2007): 90th (ninetieth)
- Agriculture in Estonia
- Banking in Estonia
  - National Bank of Estonia
- Communications in Estonia
  - Internet in Estonia
- Companies of Estonia
- Currency of Estonia: Euro
  - ISO 4217: EUR
- Energy in Estonia
  - Energy policy of Estonia
- Health care in Estonia
- Estonia Stock Exchange
- Mining in Estonia
- Tourism in Estonia
- Transport in Estonia
  - Airports in Estonia
  - Rail transport in Estonia
  - Roads in Estonia

== Education in Estonia ==
Education in Estonia

- List of schools in Estonia

== See also ==
Estonia

- List of Estonia-related topics
- List of international rankings
- Member state of the European Union
- Member state of the North Atlantic Treaty Organization
- Member state of the United Nations
- Outline of Europe
- Outline of geography
