= Einasto =

Einasto may refer to:

== People ==
- Jaan Einasto (born 1929), Estonian astrophysicist

== Astronomy ==
- Einasto Supercluster, a supercluster of galaxies, the most massive supercluster known in the Universe at the time of its discovery in 2023, named for Jaan Einasto
- 11577 Einasto, the asteroid Einasto, a main-belt asteroid, the 11577th asteroid discovered, named after Jaan Einasto

== Other uses ==
- Einasto profile, a mathematical function that describes how the density of a stellar spherical system varies with distance from the center

== See also ==
- Einsatz
- Estonia (disambiguation)
