= Estonia (disambiguation) =

Estonia is a country in Northern Europe. The same country, or larger part of it, has also been referred to as:

- Danish Estonia, a dominion of Denmark (1219–1346)
- Swedish Estonia, a dominion of Sweden (1561–1721)
- Governorate of Estonia, a province of the Russian Empire (1796–1917)
- Estonian SSR, an occupied administrative subunit of the Soviet Union (1940–41, 1944–91)
- Estonia electoral district (Russian Constituent Assembly election, 1917)
- Estonia (European Parliament constituency)

Estonia may also refer to:

- 1541 Estonia, an asteroid
- Estonia (organization), a society of culture
- Estonia Piano Factory, manufacturer of the Estonia piano brand
- Estonia (race car), a race car brand
- Estonia, Georgia, a village in Georgia
- "Estonia", a song by Marillion from This Strange Engine
- Estonia (TV series), a Finnish television series
- Estonia Theatre, an opera house and concert hall in Tallinn
- MS Estonia, a ship that sank in the Baltic Sea in 1994
  - Sinking of MS Estonia
- SS Czar, a ship also named SS Estonia

== See also ==
- Astonia, a monotypic genus of plants
- Estoniadiscus, an extinct genus of animals
- Estonian (disambiguation)
