= Internet in Estonia =

Internet in Estonia has one of the highest penetration rates in the world. In the first quarter of 2010, 75% out of 1.34 million people in the country used the Internet according to Statistics Estonia. In 2017, according to the World Bank came 13th in the world by the percentage of population using the Internet, with 88.1% people using it.

The 2022 Digital Economy and Society Index (DESI) by the European Commission ranks Estonia first in Digital Public Services among 27 European Union (EU) countries. In Human Capital, Estonia is 8th, with a significant number of ICT specialists and graduates. The country is positioned 15th in the Integration of Digital Technology, displaying varying digital adoption levels between newer companies and traditional Small and Medium-sized Enterprises (SMEs). In Connectivity, Estonia is 26th, facing particular challenges in 5G and Fixed Very High Capacity Network (VHCN) deployment. Estonia's digitalization priorities include enhancing digital infrastructure and cybersecurity.

== User statistics ==
- Top-level domain: .ee
- Internet users:
  - 1.0 million users, 119th in the world; 79.0% of the population, 34th in the world (2012);
  - 971,700 users, 102nd in the world (2009).
- Fixed broadband: 327,243 subscriptions, 78th in the world; 25.7% of the population, 31st in the world (2012).
- Wireless broadband: 924,699 subscriptions, 74th in the world; 72.5% of the population, 12th in the world (2012).
- Internet hosts: 865,494 hosts, 49th in the world (2012).
- IPv4: 1.3 million addresses allocated, less than 0.05% of the world total, 945.8 addresses per 1000 people (2012).

== Broadband ==
=== Fixed broadband ===
In Estonia, fixed broadband infrastructure exhibits a mixed performance in comparison to the EU. The fixed broadband take-up stands at 83%, which is higher than the EU's average of 78%. However, the adoption of broadband speeds of at least 100 Mbps is only at 20%, which lags behind the EU average of 41%. Estonia aligns with the EU in Fast Broadband (NGA) coverage at 90%. Its Fixed Very High Capacity Network (VHCN) coverage at 73% slightly exceeds the EU average of 70%, and Fibre to the Premises (FTTP) coverage is noteworthy at 73%, exceeding the EU's average of 50%.

=== Mobile broadband ===
Mobile broadband has a take-up rate of 87%, which is on par with the EU average. However, the country faces challenges in 5G deployment, having not allocated any spectrum for 5G as of April 2022. This lack of spectrum allocation contrasts with the EU average of 56%. Additionally, 5G coverage in Estonia's populated areas is only 18%, significantly lower than the EU average of 66%.

== Digital public services ==
Estonia is recognized for its leadership in digital public services, as evidenced by its top ranking in the EU's 2022 Digital Economy and Society Index (DESI). With an adoption rate of 89% for e-government services among its population, it exceeds the EU average of 65%. The quality of digital services offered to citizens and businesses is demonstrated by scores of 92/100 and 98/100, respectively, both surpassing the EU averages of 75 for citizens and 82 for businesses.

The country's digital framework enables public service access, with 90% of its citizens holding digital IDs. It has invested in technologies such as the Bürokratt AI network and the 3D digital twin project to improve public service efficiency and accessibility. In healthcare, Estonia has achieved a digitalization rate of 99% for prescriptions and offers a broad range of online health services. As outlined in the Digital Agenda 2030, Estonia has prioritized a 90% satisfaction rate for their digital public services.

== History ==
In 1965 the first school computer in the USSR, Ural-1, was set up in the town of Nõo. Mass usage of computing networks first came with FidoNet, the first Estonian node of which appeared in 1989. The first Internet connections in the country were introduced in 1992 at academic facilities in Tallinn and Tartu. The national domain (.ee) was registered in the middle of 1992. By virtue of its geographical location, the country played important role in transporting Internet culture to neighbouring Russia. One of the first backbone links for Russia was built in 1991 by Relcom through Estonia to Finland. In 1996 Estonian president Lennart Meri started the four-year state program "Tiigrihüpe" to computerize and internetize all of the country's schools.

The first public Wi-Fi area was launched in 2001 and a system of mobile data networks that enable widespread wireless broadband access has developed. In 2011, the country had over 2,440 free, certified Wi-Fi areas meant for public use, including at cafes, hotels, hospitals, schools, and gas stations. A countrywide wireless internet service based on CDMA technology has been deployed. Three mobile operators offer mobile 3G and 3.5G services, and as of May 2013, 4G services covered over 95 percent of the territory.

Computerization and digital connection for people are encouraged and supported by the state. The country has a digital ID card system, and in 2005 local elections were held with the official possibility to vote online – the first case of its kind in the world.

In 2008, the North Atlantic Treaty Organization (NATO) established a joint cyberdefense center in Estonia to improve cyberdefense interoperability and provide security support for all NATO members.

In 2009, the Estonian Internet Foundation was established to manage Estonia's top level domain, ".ee". As a multi-stakeholder organization it represents the Estonian Internet community internationally with respect to various Internet governance issues.

In 2013 there were over 200 operators offering electronic communications services, including six mobile phone companies and numerous Internet service providers. Voice over Internet Protocol (VoIP) services are widely available. Estonia has the largest functioning public-key infrastructure in Europe. All radio channels and TV productions, including news, of Estonian Public Broadcasting are available over the Internet in real time and archives of its radio and television programs are available at no charge.

The country's most popular search engine in Estonia is Google, although a not so common, but still existing alternative is the local Neti.ee.

== Internet surveillance and filtering ==
Estonia was rated as "Free" in the 2009, 2011 to 2015 Freedom on the Net reports from Freedom House with overall scores of 13, 10, 10, 9, 8 and 7 (top 2 in the world in 2015) on a scale where 0 is best and 100 is worst. Estonia has not been individually classified by the OpenNet Initiative (ONI), but is included in the ONI's regional overview for the Commonwealth of Independent States.

Freedom of speech and freedom of expression are protected by Estonia's constitution and by the country's obligations as an EU member state. Anonymity is unrestricted, and there have been extensive public discussions on anonymity and the respectful use of the Internet. Work is underway to bring Estonian law into compliance with the European Council Framework on "combating certain forms and expressions of racism and xenophobia by means of criminal law".

Restrictions on Internet content and communications in Estonia are among the lightest in the world. ISPs and other communications companies are required to register with the Estonian Technical Surveillance Authority (ETSA), a branch of the Ministry of Economic Affairs and Communications, though there is no registration fee. Electronic communications companies are required to preserve traffic and location data for one year, as defined by the EU Data Retention Directive. They may only provide this data to surveillance agencies or security authorities when presented with a court order. A 2008 court case made web service providers responsible for reader comments, but that ruling is being appealed at the European Court of Human Rights. There have been instances of content removal involving civil court orders to remove inappropriate or off-topic reader comments from online news, discussion forums, and other sites. In 2012, over 80,000 videos were removed from YouTube and other streaming services for possible copyright infringement. The Personal Data Protection Act (PDPA) restricts the collection and public dissemination of an individual's personal data. No personal information that is considered sensitive—such as political opinions, religious or philosophical beliefs, ethnic or racial origin, sexual behavior, health, or criminal convictions—can be processed without the consent of the individual.

Prior to the blocking of remote gambling sites in 2010 the Internet in Estonia was free of censorship. Early in 2010 Estonia started DNS filtering of remote gambling sites that violate the renewed Gambling Act (2008). The Gambling Act requires that servers for legal remote gambling must be physically located in Estonia. In March 2010 the Tax and Customs Board had compiled a blocking list containing 175 sites which ISPs are to enforce. As of September 2013 the list had grown to include over 800 sites.

== Web browsers ==
As of 2024, most used web browsers according to Statcounter were:

Web browser	Market share	Reference
Chrome	67%	
Safari	9.6%	
Firefox	7.5%	
Edge	6.6%	
Opera	5.9%	
Samsung Internet	1.5%	
Yandex Browser	0.52%	
Explorer	0.10%	
Android	0.09%	
other	0.19%	

As of 2024, most used web browsers according to Cloudflare were:

Web browser	Market share	Reference
Chrome	64%	
Safari	14%	
Firefox	6.7%	
Edge	5.8%	
Samsung Internet	3.1%	
Opera	2.2%	
Brave	1.2%	
Yandex Browser	0.66%	
DuckDuckGo Private Browser	0.16%	
Huawei Browser	0.12%	
Mi Browser	0.06%	
Avast Secure Browser	0.06%	

== See also ==
- Telecommunications in Estonia
