= Telecommunications in Estonia =

Telecommunications in Estonia describes the infrastructure, market, and regulatory environment for telecommunication services in the country. Since regaining independence in 1991, Estonia has developed from a poorly connected Soviet republic into one of the world's most advanced digital nations.

== History ==
=== Soviet era and post-independence legacy ===
Prior to Estonia's independence in 1991, the country had poorly developed telecommunications infrastructure from the Soviet Era. In 1992, all international calls from the country were still routed through Moscow, and a rotary-dial phone was a sign of wealth. Less than half its population had a telephone line and its only independent link to the outside world was reportedly a Finnish mobile phone concealed in the foreign minister's garden.

=== Post-1991 reforms and liberalisation ===
Following their independence, Eesti Telefon was founded. The company received a copper-pair network along with a queue of almost 150,000 people waiting for a phone hook-up. The foundation for telecommunication development was laid in 1992 by Mart Laar's government, which implemented economic reforms including a flat income-tax, free trade, and privatisation. When Finland offered Estonia its outdated 1970s analogue telephone-exchange for free, Estonia declined and chose to build a digital system from scratch. They also created a paperless registry

Eesti Telefon (renamed Elion in 2003), invested 5.4 billion kroon (approximately €345 million at the December 2002 exchange rate) over ten years in the network. By 2002, digitalisation reached 77%. In early 1995, there were 97 registered telecommunications enterprises, most privately owned. The sector was more available to other companies by January 2001 when Elion's monopoly over Estonian telecommunication ended and the market opened to foreign investments.

=== Mobile telephone development ===
Estonian-Finnish-Swedish joint company Eesti Mobiiltelefon (EMT) opened its first mobile network on 1 June 1991 and used NMT 450 technology. Initially, mobile phones were hard to get with their prices being around €1,500. The monthly salary at that time averaged at only €10. By the end of 1991, EMT had only 150 subscribers, and initial market predictions estimated a potential total of 6,500 users.

EMT began developing a GSM network in 1993, opening the first base stations in Tallinn on August. Subscribing to the service required a bank guarantee or prepayment of at least 5,000 Estonian Kroon. By 1995, EMT had GSM network covering all county centers and main highways. SMS service became available from July 1995 using Sonera's Finnish SMS center. EMT reached 100,000 subscribers by 1996.

=== Internet and digital services expansion ===
A nationwide project was launched aimed to equip all classrooms with computers by 1995. In 2000, the government declared internet access a human right and helped to spread internet to rural areas. The same year, EMT launched mobile parking—a revolutionary service still uncommon globally—and mobile positioning for emergency services.

Mobile internet development accelerated rapidly in the country. GPRS (launched in 2001) was up to 53 Kbps. This was followed by EDGE (236 Kbps) in 2003, and the first commercial 3G network became available in October 2004, enabling video calls and faster data. By the summer of 2005, internet speed in Estonia had reached 3.6 Mbps, and the 3G network covered all of Estonia.

Estonia introduced Mobile ID in 2007, allowing citizens to use their mobile phones for secure digital identification, including signing documents and voting. 4G networks launched in 2010 and achieved nationwide coverage by 2013.

== Market structure and major operators ==
Estonia's telecommunications market has a mix of established Nordic-owned operators and innovative local companies. The market is mainly controlled by three major mobile network operators (MNOs) and numerous smaller providers including Mobile Virtual Network Operators (MVNOs) and specialized business-to-business (B2B) service companies.

=== Major mobile network operators ===
The Estonian mobile market is dominated by three main operators, all subsidiaries of larger Nordic telecommunications groups:

- Telia Estonia: A subsidiary of the Swedish-Finnish group Telia Company. It is one of the largest telecommunications providers in the Baltics.
- Elisa Estonia (formerly Elisa Eesti): Part of the Finnish-based Elisa Corporation
- Tele2 Estonia: A subsidiary of the Swedish Tele2 Group

=== Other telecommunications companies ===
Other minor companies include:

- CSC Telecom Estonia
- Teliqon Communications OÜ
- PROTEI
- TEZ Telecom Holding
- Dzinga
- Dexatel
- DOTT Telecom OÜ
- Testelium
- Estonian Fiber OÜ
- OMNICOMM

== Current telecommunications infrastructure ==
As of 2021, Estonia's telecommunications infrastructure is highly advanced, shown by its widespread fiber-optic cable systems and comprehensive mobile coverage.

- Fixed-line telephone: There were approximately 324,388 main line subscriptions in 2019, equivalent to 26.24 per 100 inhabitants.
- Mobile cellular: Mobile subscriptions reached 1,951,051 in 2019, with a penetration rate of 157.82 subscriptions per 100 inhabitants.
- Broadband: Fixed broadband subscriptions totaled 431,251 in 2019, or 34.88 per 100 inhabitants.
- Internet users: 89.36% of the population were internet users as of July 2018, totaling 1,111,896 individuals.

=== Telecommunication systems ===
Estonia's telecommunication system benefits from regulatory measures, competition, and foreign investment, resulting in high-quality voice, data, and internet services. The country has one of the most advanced mobile markets and highest broadband penetration rates in Europe. The government has committed €20 million to a rural broadband program.

Domestically, fiber-optic cable systems carry telephone, TV, and radio traffic digitally. Internet services are widely available, with schools and libraries connected. A large percentage of households have broadband access.

Internationally, Estonia uses country code 372. Key submarine cables landing in Estonia include the EE-S1, EESF-3, Baltic Sea Submarine Cable, FEC, and EESF-2, connecting to Finland and Sweden. Two international switches operate in Tallinn.

=== Broadcasting media ===
Eesti Rahvusringhääling (ERR) operates three TV channels and five radio networks. Numerous private commercial radio stations broadcast nationally, regionally and locally. Estonia fully transitioned to digital television in 2010. By 2016, there were 42 on-demand services available, and roughly 85% of households accessed digital television services.

The internet country code for Estonia is .ee.

== Digital growth and e-governance ==
Estonia's rapid advancements in digitalization helped bolster the country's digital space and leaped its IT stage from an early start.

=== Digital ID and e-services ===
Every Estonian citizen is issued a unique 11-digit digital identifier at birth. This secure digital ID allows access to public e-services.

Key e-services include:

- E-Tax: 98% of tax declarations are filed online.
- E-Banking: Estonia transitioned directly to electronic banking. Hansabank launched the first e-banking solution in 1993. By 2003, 95% of payments were made via e-banking.
- E-Company Registration: 98% of companies are now established online.
- E-Health: Citizens have online access to their electronic health records.

=== E-Residency ===
In December 2014, Estonia launched the e-Residency program. This initiative allows non-Estonians to become "digital residents" and access Estonian e-services, including registering an EU-based company. The program aimed to create a digital society of ten million e-residents by 2025.

=== I-Voting ===
Estonia first introduced online voting in local elections in 2005. In the 2014 European Parliament elections, over 103,000 voters (31% of all voters) cast their ballots online.

== See also ==
- Internet in Estonia
- Skype
- Wise
