= Climate of Estonia =

Köppen climate classification types of Estonia

Estonia lies in the northern part of the temperate climate zone and in the transition zone between maritime and continental climate. Because Estonia (and all of Northern Europe) is continuously warmed by maritime air influenced by the heat content of the northern Atlantic Ocean, it has a milder climate despite its northern latitude. The Baltic Sea causes differences between the climate of coastal and inland areas.

Estonia has four seasons of near-equal length. Average temperatures range from 17.8 °C (64.0 °F) on the Baltic islands to 18.4 °C (65.1 °F) inland in July, the warmest month, and from −1.4 °C (29.5 °F) on the Baltic islands to −5.3 °C (22.5 °F) inland in February, the coldest month.

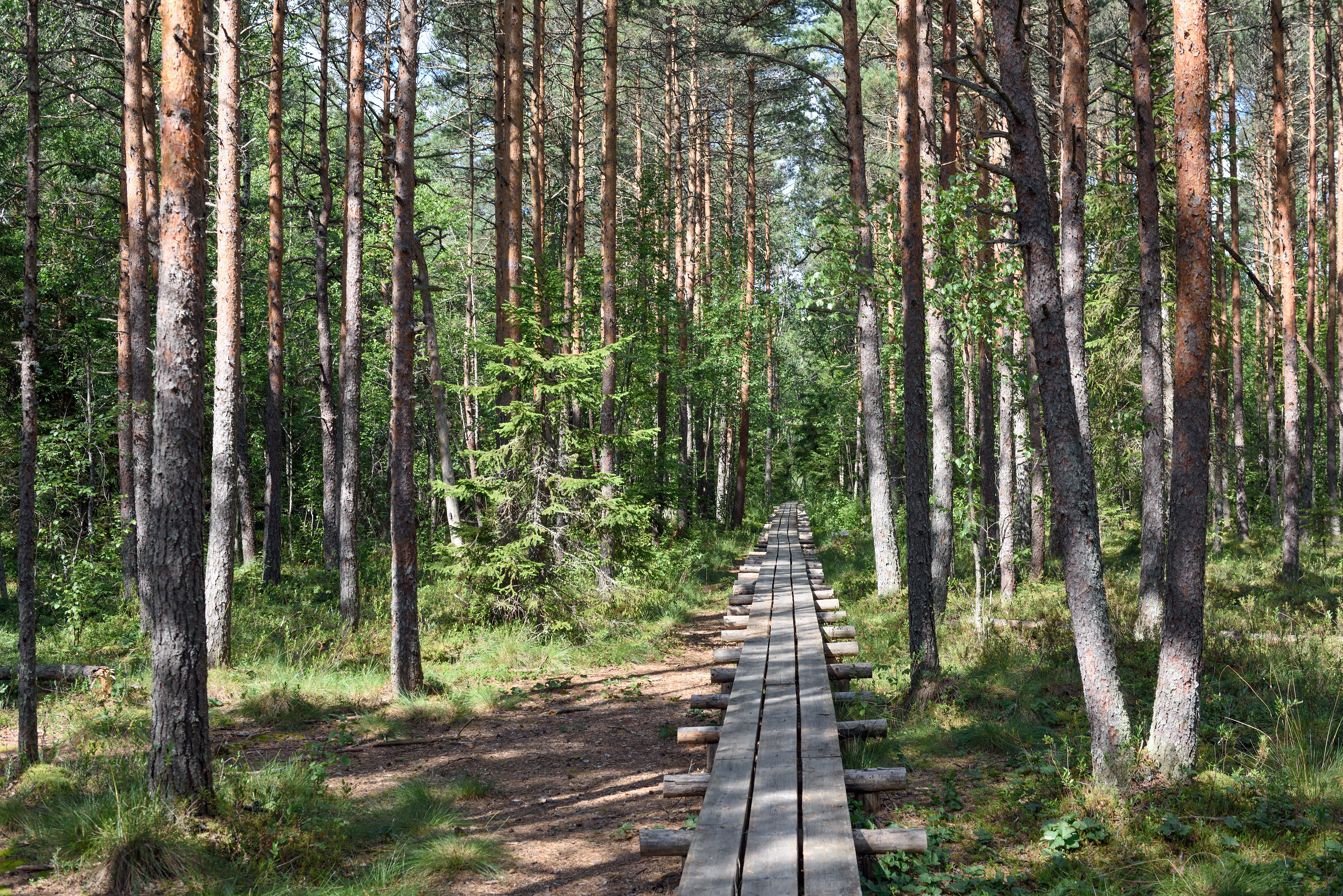
Estonia Endla Nature Reserve 07 Forest

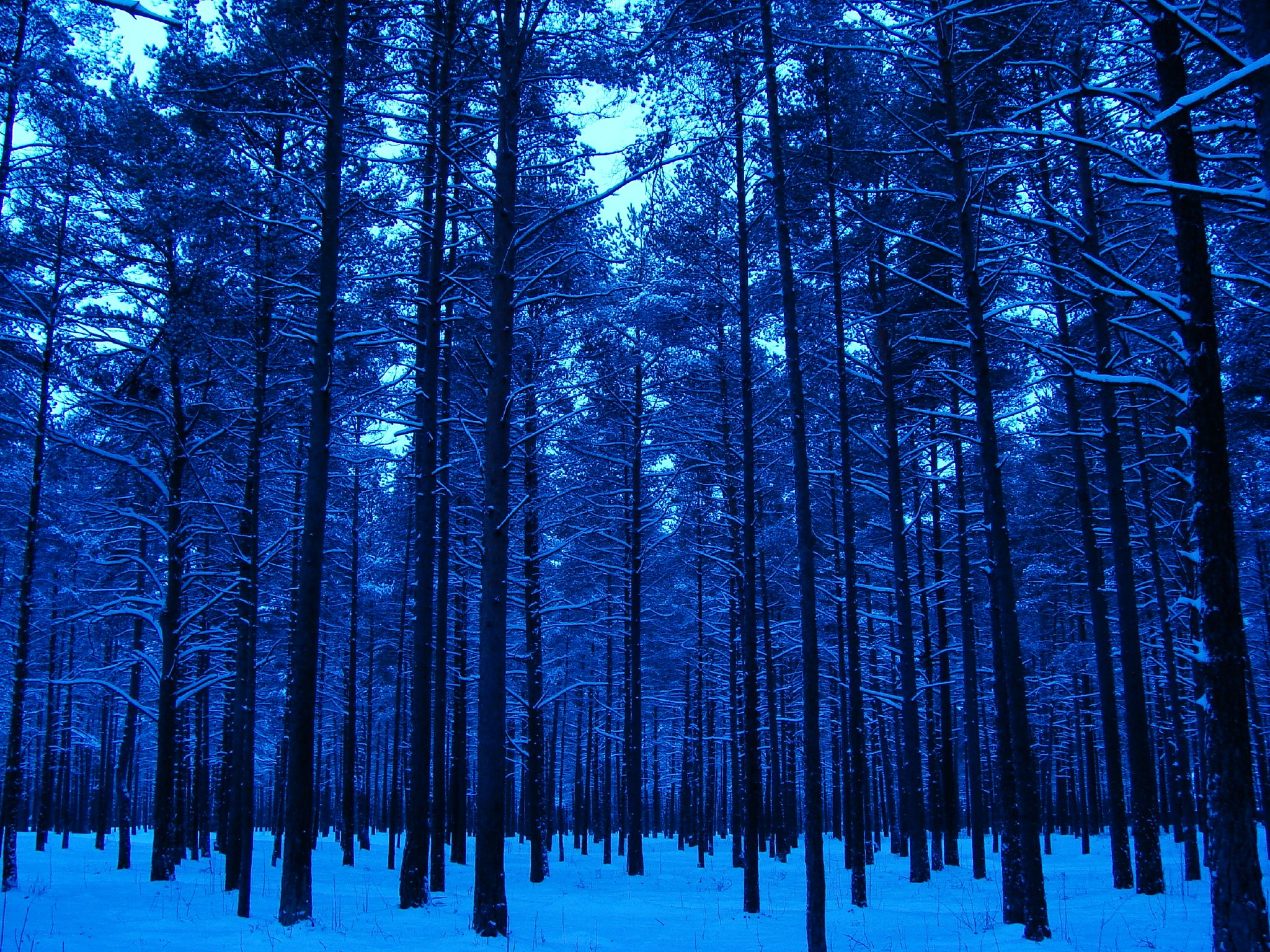
Young pines stand in winter

The average annual temperature in Estonia is 6.4 °C (43.5 °F). The climate is also influenced by the Atlantic Ocean, the North-Atlantic Stream and the Icelandic Minimum, which is an area known for the formation of cyclones and where the average air pressure is lower than in neighbouring areas.

Estonia is located in a humid zone in which the amount of precipitation is greater than total evaporation. The average precipitation in 1991–2020 ranged from 573 to 761 millimetres (22.6 to 30.0 in) per year and was the heaviest in late summer. There were between 102 and 127 rainy days a year, and the average precipitation was the most plentiful on the western slopes of the Sakala and Haanja Uplands.

== Temperature ==
Climate data for Estonia
Month	Jan	Feb	Mar	Apr	May	Jun	Jul	Aug	Sep	Oct	Nov	Dec	Year
Mean daily maximum °C (°F)	−0.9 (30.4)	−1.1 (30.0)	2.7 (36.9)	9.5 (49.1)	15.6 (60.1)	19.4 (66.9)	22.4 (72.3)	21.3 (70.3)	16.2 (61.2)	9.6 (49.3)	4.1 (39.4)	1.0 (33.8)	10.0 (50.0)
Mean daily minimum °C (°F)	−5.6 (21.9)	−6.5 (20.3)	−3.9 (25.0)	0.9 (33.6)	5.6 (42.1)	10.2 (50.4)	13.2 (55.8)	12.5 (54.5)	8.6 (47.5)	3.9 (39.0)	0.0 (32.0)	−3.1 (26.4)	3.0 (37.4)
Average precipitation mm (inches)	49 (1.9)	39 (1.5)	35 (1.4)	34 (1.3)	42 (1.7)	70 (2.8)	67 (2.6)	81 (3.2)	58 (2.3)	72 (2.8)	61 (2.4)	53 (2.1)	661 (26)
Source: http://www.ilmateenistus.ee/kliima/kliimanormid/ohutemperatuur/?lang=en

Climate data for Tallinn, Estonia (normals 1991–2020 and extremes 1805–present)
Month	Jan	Feb	Mar	Apr	May	Jun	Jul	Aug	Sep	Oct	Nov	Dec	Year
Record high °C (°F)	9.2 (48.6)	10.2 (50.4)	15.9 (60.6)	27.2 (81.0)	31.4 (88.5)	32.6 (90.7)	34.3 (93.7)	34.2 (93.6)	28.0 (82.4)	21.8 (71.2)	14.1 (57.4)	11.6 (52.9)	34.3 (93.7)
Mean daily maximum °C (°F)	−0.7 (30.7)	−1.0 (30.2)	2.8 (37.0)	9.5 (49.1)	15.4 (59.7)	19.2 (66.6)	22.2 (72.0)	21.0 (69.8)	16.1 (61.0)	9.5 (49.1)	4.1 (39.4)	1.2 (34.2)	9.9 (49.8)
Daily mean °C (°F)	−2.9 (26.8)	−3.6 (25.5)	−0.6 (30.9)	4.8 (40.6)	10.2 (50.4)	14.5 (58.1)	17.6 (63.7)	16.5 (61.7)	12.0 (53.6)	6.5 (43.7)	2.0 (35.6)	−0.9 (30.4)	6.4 (43.5)
Mean daily minimum °C (°F)	−5.5 (22.1)	−6.2 (20.8)	−3.7 (25.3)	0.7 (33.3)	5.2 (41.4)	9.8 (49.6)	13.1 (55.6)	12.3 (54.1)	8.4 (47.1)	3.7 (38.7)	−0.2 (31.6)	−3.1 (26.4)	2.9 (37.2)
Record low °C (°F)	−31.4 (−24.5)	−28.7 (−19.7)	−24.5 (−12.1)	−12.0 (10.4)	−5.0 (23.0)	0.0 (32.0)	4.0 (39.2)	2.4 (36.3)	−4.1 (24.6)	−10.5 (13.1)	−18.8 (−1.8)	−24.3 (−11.7)	−31.4 (−24.5)
Average precipitation mm (inches)	56 (2.2)	40 (1.6)	37 (1.5)	35 (1.4)	37 (1.5)	68 (2.7)	82 (3.2)	85 (3.3)	58 (2.3)	78 (3.1)	66 (2.6)	59 (2.3)	700 (27.6)
Average rainy days	10	8	9	12	11	13	13	14	17	18	16	12	153
Average snowy days	19	18	13	5	0.4	0	0	0	0	2	11	18	87
Average relative humidity (%)	89	86	80	72	69	74	76	79	82	85	89	89	81
Mean monthly sunshine hours	29.7	58.8	148.4	217.3	306.0	294.3	312.1	255.6	162.3	88.3	29.1	20.7	1,922.7
Average ultraviolet index	0	1	1	3	4	5	5	4	3	1	0	0	2
Source 1: Estonian Weather Service
Source 2: Pogodaiklimat.ru (rainy and snowy days) and Weather Atlas

Climate data for Tartu (Tõravere) normals 1991–2020, extremes 1865–present
Month	Jan	Feb	Mar	Apr	May	Jun	Jul	Aug	Sep	Oct	Nov	Dec	Year
Record high °C (°F)	9.7 (49.5)	10.9 (51.6)	18.4 (65.1)	27.5 (81.5)	30.9 (87.6)	34.0 (93.2)	34.9 (94.8)	35.2 (95.4)	30.3 (86.5)	21.5 (70.7)	13.8 (56.8)	13.0 (55.4)	35.2 (95.4)
Mean daily maximum °C (°F)	−1.8 (28.8)	−1.6 (29.1)	3.3 (37.9)	11.1 (52.0)	17.1 (62.8)	20.6 (69.1)	23.1 (73.6)	21.8 (71.2)	16.3 (61.3)	9.2 (48.6)	3.3 (37.9)	0.0 (32.0)	10.2 (50.4)
Daily mean °C (°F)	−4.1 (24.6)	−4.4 (24.1)	−0.5 (31.1)	5.9 (42.6)	11.5 (52.7)	15.5 (59.9)	18.0 (64.4)	16.7 (62.1)	11.8 (53.2)	6.0 (42.8)	1.2 (34.2)	−2.1 (28.2)	6.3 (43.3)
Mean daily minimum °C (°F)	−6.5 (20.3)	−7.3 (18.9)	−4 (25)	1.2 (34.2)	5.8 (42.4)	10.3 (50.5)	12.9 (55.2)	12.0 (53.6)	8.0 (46.4)	3.3 (37.9)	−0.8 (30.6)	−4.2 (24.4)	2.6 (36.7)
Record low °C (°F)	−37.5 (−35.5)	−36.0 (−32.8)	−29.6 (−21.3)	−19.8 (−3.6)	−7.2 (19.0)	−2.2 (28.0)	1.8 (35.2)	1.5 (34.7)	−6.6 (20.1)	−13.8 (7.2)	−22.2 (−8.0)	−38.6 (−37.5)	−38.6 (−37.5)
Average precipitation mm (inches)	48 (1.9)	39 (1.5)	36 (1.4)	35 (1.4)	54 (2.1)	88 (3.5)	67 (2.6)	79 (3.1)	55 (2.2)	68 (2.7)	55 (2.2)	51 (2.0)	673 (26.5)
Average precipitation days (≥ 1.0 mm)	10	8	8	8	8	10	11	11	11	11	11	11	118
Average relative humidity (%)	88	85	76	68	65	70	74	77	82	86	89	89	79
Mean monthly sunshine hours	33.7	65.1	140.3	190.9	266.0	258.0	268.7	227.6	152.1	79.3	30.0	24.3	1,735.9
Source: Estonian Weather Service (precipitation days 1971–2000)

Climate data for Pärnu (normals 1991–2020, extremes 1842–present)
Month	Jan	Feb	Mar	Apr	May	Jun	Jul	Aug	Sep	Oct	Nov	Dec	Year
Record high °C (°F)	9.0 (48.2)	8.3 (46.9)	18.1 (64.6)	26.2 (79.2)	31.2 (88.2)	32.6 (90.7)	34.1 (93.4)	33.4 (92.1)	28.0 (82.4)	22.4 (72.3)	12.6 (54.7)	10.3 (50.5)	34.1 (93.4)
Mean daily maximum °C (°F)	−0.8 (30.6)	−1 (30)	3.0 (37.4)	10.2 (50.4)	16.7 (62.1)	20.2 (68.4)	23.0 (73.4)	21.8 (71.2)	16.6 (61.9)	9.9 (49.8)	4.3 (39.7)	1.1 (34.0)	10.4 (50.7)
Daily mean °C (°F)	−3.0 (26.6)	−3.7 (25.3)	−0.5 (31.1)	5.4 (41.7)	11.4 (52.5)	15.4 (59.7)	18.3 (64.9)	17.2 (63.0)	12.5 (54.5)	6.8 (44.2)	2.2 (36.0)	−0.9 (30.4)	6.8 (44.2)
Mean daily minimum °C (°F)	−5.5 (22.1)	−6.6 (20.1)	−3.7 (25.3)	1.2 (34.2)	6.1 (43.0)	10.7 (51.3)	13.6 (56.5)	12.8 (55.0)	8.6 (47.5)	3.8 (38.8)	0.0 (32.0)	−3.1 (26.4)	3.2 (37.8)
Record low °C (°F)	−34.8 (−30.6)	−34.3 (−29.7)	−28.5 (−19.3)	−19.7 (−3.5)	−5.3 (22.5)	−0.1 (31.8)	3.4 (38.1)	2.6 (36.7)	−4.7 (23.5)	−10.9 (12.4)	−22.2 (−8.0)	−34.5 (−30.1)	−34.8 (−30.6)
Average precipitation mm (inches)	61 (2.4)	49 (1.9)	43 (1.7)	40 (1.6)	39 (1.5)	78 (3.1)	74 (2.9)	84 (3.3)	61 (2.4)	83 (3.3)	73 (2.9)	71 (2.8)	761 (30.0)
Average precipitation days (≥ 1.0 mm)	12	9	10	8	7	9	10	10	11	12	14	14	125
Average relative humidity (%)	88	87	81	73	68	73	75	78	82	86	89	89	81
Mean monthly sunshine hours	38.8	69.6	148.2	210.1	300.3	293.5	306.4	258.6	172.8	95.5	36.5	24.3	1,950.2
Source: Estonian Weather Service (precipitation days 1971–2000)

Climate data for Vilsandi (normals 1991–2020, extremes 1865–present)
Month	Jan	Feb	Mar	Apr	May	Jun	Jul	Aug	Sep	Oct	Nov	Dec	Year
Record high °C (°F)	8.1 (46.6)	8.0 (46.4)	15.0 (59.0)	23.5 (74.3)	28.7 (83.7)	31.6 (88.9)	32.1 (89.8)	32.4 (90.3)	27.9 (82.2)	19.7 (67.5)	13.1 (55.6)	10.2 (50.4)	32.4 (90.3)
Mean daily maximum °C (°F)	1.3 (34.3)	0.4 (32.7)	2.6 (36.7)	7.6 (45.7)	12.9 (55.2)	17.1 (62.8)	20.8 (69.4)	20.6 (69.1)	16.1 (61.0)	10.5 (50.9)	6.0 (42.8)	3.3 (37.9)	9.9 (49.8)
Daily mean °C (°F)	−0.3 (31.5)	−1.4 (29.5)	0.6 (33.1)	4.7 (40.5)	9.7 (49.5)	14.2 (57.6)	17.8 (64.0)	17.8 (64.0)	13.9 (57.0)	8.7 (47.7)	4.5 (40.1)	1.9 (35.4)	7.7 (45.9)
Mean daily minimum °C (°F)	−2.2 (28.0)	−3.3 (26.1)	−1.4 (29.5)	2.4 (36.3)	7.0 (44.6)	11.7 (53.1)	15.4 (59.7)	15.3 (59.5)	11.7 (53.1)	6.7 (44.1)	2.8 (37.0)	0.1 (32.2)	5.5 (41.9)
Record low °C (°F)	−31.8 (−25.2)	−28.1 (−18.6)	−26.2 (−15.2)	−13.6 (7.5)	−3.1 (26.4)	3.2 (37.8)	7.1 (44.8)	7.3 (45.1)	0.4 (32.7)	−6.4 (20.5)	−10.8 (12.6)	−28.6 (−19.5)	−31.8 (−25.2)
Average precipitation mm (inches)	44 (1.7)	33 (1.3)	33 (1.3)	28 (1.1)	31 (1.2)	47 (1.9)	49 (1.9)	73 (2.9)	59 (2.3)	67 (2.6)	63 (2.5)	52 (2.0)	577 (22.7)
Average precipitation days (≥ 1.0 mm)	11	8	8	8	7	7	8	9	12	12	14	13	116
Average relative humidity (%)	86	86	83	81	80	82	81	80	81	82	86	86	83
Mean monthly sunshine hours	37.3	69.0	150.4	226.1	316.1	313.5	330.1	270.5	175.7	100.3	38.3	24.0	2,065.8
Source: Estonian Weather Service (precipitation days 1971–2000)

== Spring ==
Spring is usually dry and mild. The weather in April can be the most changeable, in the first half of the month there can sometimes be snowy days but at the same time it is sometimes possible to experience days when the temperature rises above 20 °C. Spring is the warmest inland in southern Estonia and the coolest on the coast. May is the warmest month in spring when the first warm spells arrive and the temperatures can reach 20-30 °C. Thunder season starts in April.

== Summer ==
Summers are mild, warmer in south and east Estonia, colder on the islands. On some days temperatures can reach up to 30-35 °C, but they are usually near 20 °C. The warmest month is July, but the official maximum air temperature record was recorded in August at 35.6 °C. Highest temperature ever recorded in Estonia is 38.0 °C in August in Himmiste in Põlva county. Thunderstorms can be commonly seen in the afternoon.

== Autumn ==
Autumn is wet and windy. The first half of September can be warm. Many cyclones come from the southwest and west and bring heavy rains with thunderstorm to Estonia. Some storms can cause coastal flooding and winds over 35 m/s. In the coming months, the weather gradually cools down, the share of cloudy days increases. The first snow usually comes in late October or November. Autumn in coastal areas is considerably milder than inland.

== Winter ==
It is colder in Eastern Estonia, and warmer on the coastal areas. The coldest months are January and February; some nights can be as cold as -35 °C. The record low is -43.5 °C. Cyclones bring snowstorms. Sometimes, the sea effect affects Estonia, bringing more snow.

== Wind ==
The strongest wind was in 1969 in Ruhnu, 48 m/s.

== Sunshine ==
The total annual sunshine is 1,829.6 hours. The sunniest month is usually July followed by May, the cloudiest month is usually December followed by November.

== See also ==
- Geography of Estonia
