= Tõnu Samuel =

Estonian hacker (born 1972)

Tõnu Samuel (born 3 July 1972) is an Estonian hacker commonly cited by mainstream media in topics regarding network security.

Samuel was born in Tallinn. Between 1979 and 1988, he attended the Tallinn Secondary School of Science. In 1990–1992 he took courses in business and financial management. His career as a programmer began in 1991, while working at the Estonian Ministry of Communication.

In 2011 Samuel moved to work in Japan. Before that he lived about 10 years in Räpina in southeastern Estonia.

== Objections to the Estonian Internet Foundation and Founding of the Estonian Internet Community ==
In 2010, management of the internet country code top-level domain for Estonia (.ee) was transferred to the Estonian Internet Foundation (EIF). Samuel and Jaan Jänesmäe authored an open letter objecting to the changeover at the time it happened, citing high costs and a belief that the EIF "has consistently ignored the real needs of the Estonian Internet community". (Note: Quotation is taken from the machine translation.) They urged the board of the EIF to resign.

When the appeal did not succeed, Samuel and 21 others founded the Estonian Internet Community (Eesti Interneti Kogukond) NGO to advocate for internet users in Estonia. The NGO was founded 7 October 2010; Samuel left the board "at his own request" on 6 February 2011, and was re-elected in April of that year. As of December 2025, he was still listed as member of the NGO.
