= Estonian Weather Service =

Estonian national meteorological service

- Riigi Ilmateenistus

Department overview
- Formed: June 1, 2013; 13 years ago
- Preceding department: Estonian Meteorological and Hydrological Institute
- Jurisdiction: Government of Estonia
- Headquarters: Tallinn, Estonia; 59.423985°N 24.6997°E
- Department executives: Taimar Ala, Director of the Estonian Environment Agency; Svetlana Pudova, Data Management And Monitoring Function Manager of the Estonian Environment Agency
- Parent department: Estonian Environment Agency
- Parent department: Ministry of the Environment
- Website: www.ilmateenistus.ee?lang=en

The Estonian Weather Service (Estonian: Riigi Ilmateenistus) is the Estonian national meteorological service.

Estonian Weather Service is a department part of the Estonian Environment Agency, which in turn is under the responsibility of the Ministry of Climate.

Estonian Weather Service is a member of the World Meteorological Organization (WMO) and European Organisation for the Exploitation of Meteorological Satellites (EUMETSAT).

Before 1 June 2013, the department was a separate agency on its own known as the Estonian Meteorological and Hydrological Institute (EMHI).

Estonian Weather Service's webpage offers a 4-day-forecast (also in Russian and English), week forecast and month forecast (only in Estonian). Page also has a radar, model forecast and warnings.
