= Estonian =

Estonian may refer to:

- Something of, from, or related to Estonia, a country in the Baltic region in northern Europe
- Estonians, people from Estonia, or of Estonian descent
- Estonian language
- Estonian cuisine
- Estonian culture

== See also ==
- Estonia (disambiguation)
- Languages of Estonia
- List of Estonians
