= Agriculture in Estonia =

Aspect of Estonian economy

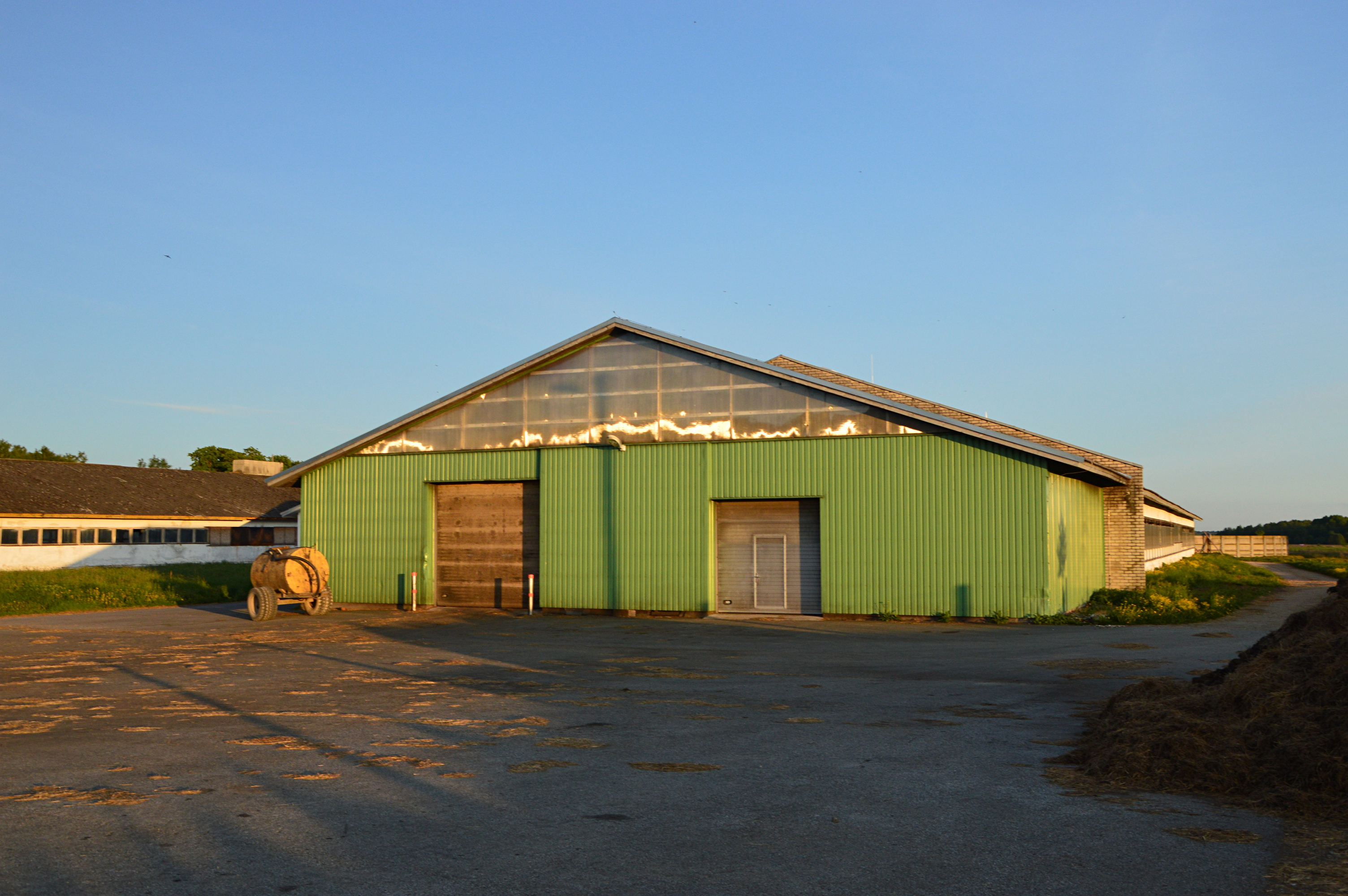
Dairy farm in Estonia

Traditionally, agriculture in Estonia has emphasized livestock production, with most crops grown for feed. Farmers also grow potatoes, vegetables, flax and sugar beet. The industry has been in great flux since the degeneration of the collective and state farm systems.

== History ==
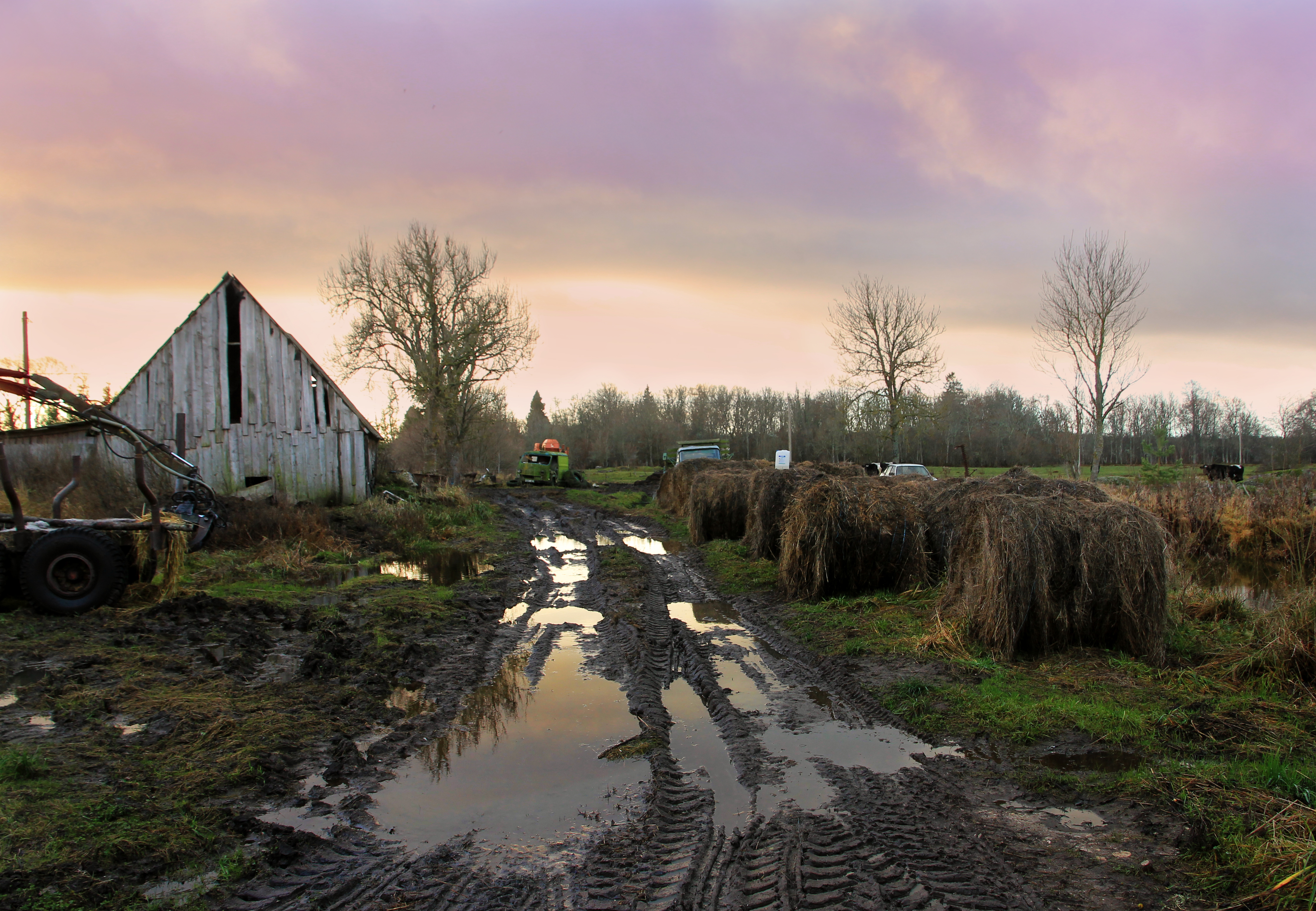
Small local farm in Lääne County

In 1991 roughly 12 percent of the labor force was employed in agriculture, producing 15.4 percent of Estonia's GDP. Estonia has 985,000 hectares of utilised agricultural land, 707,000 hectares of which are arable. During the Soviet era, arable land decreased by nearly 405,000 hectares, much becoming forest. Collectivization in the late 1940s and 1950s brought great hardship to Estonian agriculture, which during the first independence period had been the mainstay of Estonian society. Still, Estonian agriculture remained more productive than the Soviet average. In 1990 there were 221 collective and 117 state farms with an average of 350 to 400 workers each. The average livestock herd per farm included 1,900 cattle and 2,500 pigs. Estonia was a net exporter of meat and milk to the other republics. Agriculture also served as the basis for the republic's strong food-processing industry. For its meat production, however, Estonia relied heavily on feed grain from Russia. When the republic sought to cut back on meat exports in the late 1980s, Russia retaliated by slowing the provision of feed grain, which cut Estonian production even further. Increases in fuel prices and a general fuel crisis in early 1992 also hit agricultural production very hard. Although the total area of field crops grew in the early 1990s, total production and average yields fell markedly.

Reform of Estonia's agricultural system began in December 1989 with adoption of the Law on Private Farming (Estonian: Eesti NSV taluseadus). The law allowed individuals to take up to fifty hectares of land for private planting and for growing crops. The land was heritable but could not be bought or sold. The goal of the reform was to stimulate production and return the spirit of private farming to a countryside worn down by decades of central planning. Six months after implementation, nearly 2,000 farms were set up, with several thousand waiting for approval. A year later, more than 3,500 private farms were operating. Starting in October 1991, farmers were allowed to own their land. This boosted the number of farms to 7,200 by early 1992. As of the first half of 1993, a total of 8,781 farms had been created, covering approximately 225,000 hectares, or a quarter of Estonia's arable land.

In May 1993, the Estonian parliament passed a law on property taxes, which had been a major concern for many farmers before getting into business. The law mandated a 0.5 percent tax on property values to be paid to the state and a 0.3 to 0.7 percent share to be paid to local governments. More than property taxes, the costs of commodities such as fuel and new equipment were considered most likely to prove burdensome to many new farmers.

With the introduction of private agriculture, many collective farms began to disintegrate. Corruption and "spontaneous privatization" of farm equipment by farm directors grew. A number of Estonia's more successful farms were reorganized into cooperatives. Over the long term, the government predicted that 40,000 to 60,000 private farms averaging fifty hectares would be optimal. At the same time, Estonians were likely to maintain a very high rate of consumption of home-grown fruits and vegetables. A 1993 survey by the Estonian State Statistics Board indicated that nearly 80 percent of all potatoes consumed by Estonians either were privately grown or were received from friends or relatives. Thirty percent of eggs were received outside the market as well as 71.5 percent of all juice. Overall, Estonians reported getting over 20 percent of their food from private production or from friends or relatives.

== Production ==
Estonia produced in 2018:

- 450 thousand tons of wheat;
- 347 thousand tons of barley;
- 113 thousand tons of rapeseed;
- 88 thousand tons of potato;
- 78 thousand tons of oats;
- 53 thousand tons of peas;
- 29 thousand tons of rye;

In addition to smaller productions of other agricultural products.

== Forestry ==
Estonia has 1.8 million hectares of forest with approximately 274 million cubic meters of timber. Accounting for about 9 percent of industrial production in 1992, forest-related industries seem likely to grow further in the 1990s, thanks to expanding furniture and timber exports.

== Fishing ==
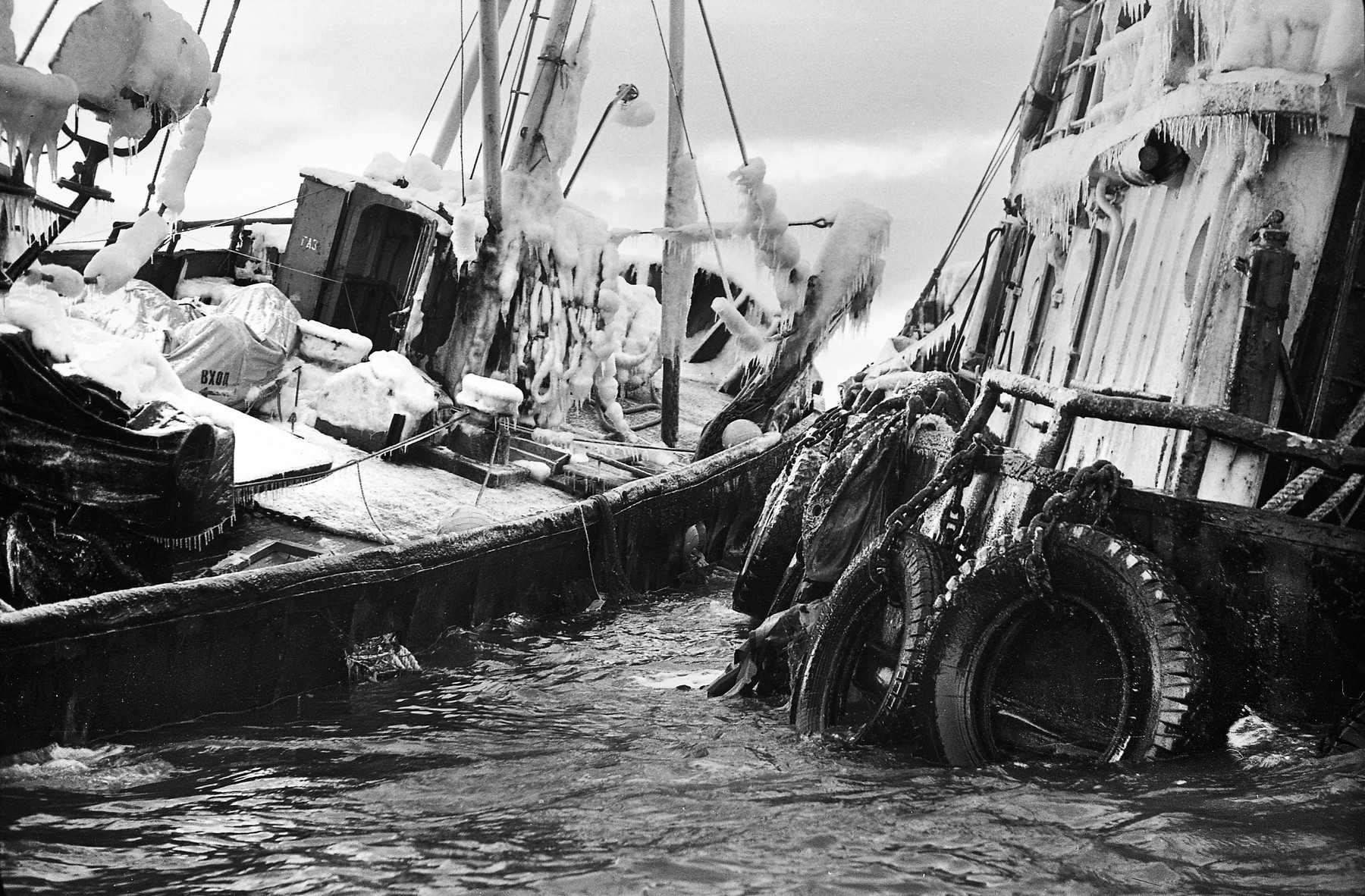
Sea rescue of a fishing boat in 1973

The fishing industry, once entirely under Soviet control, also has the potential to contribute to the country's economy. With 230 ships, including ninety oceangoing vessels, this profitable industry operated widely in international waters. A large share of Estonia's food-industry exports consists of fish and fish products. In 1992 about 131,000 tons of live fish were caught.
