= Name of Estonia =

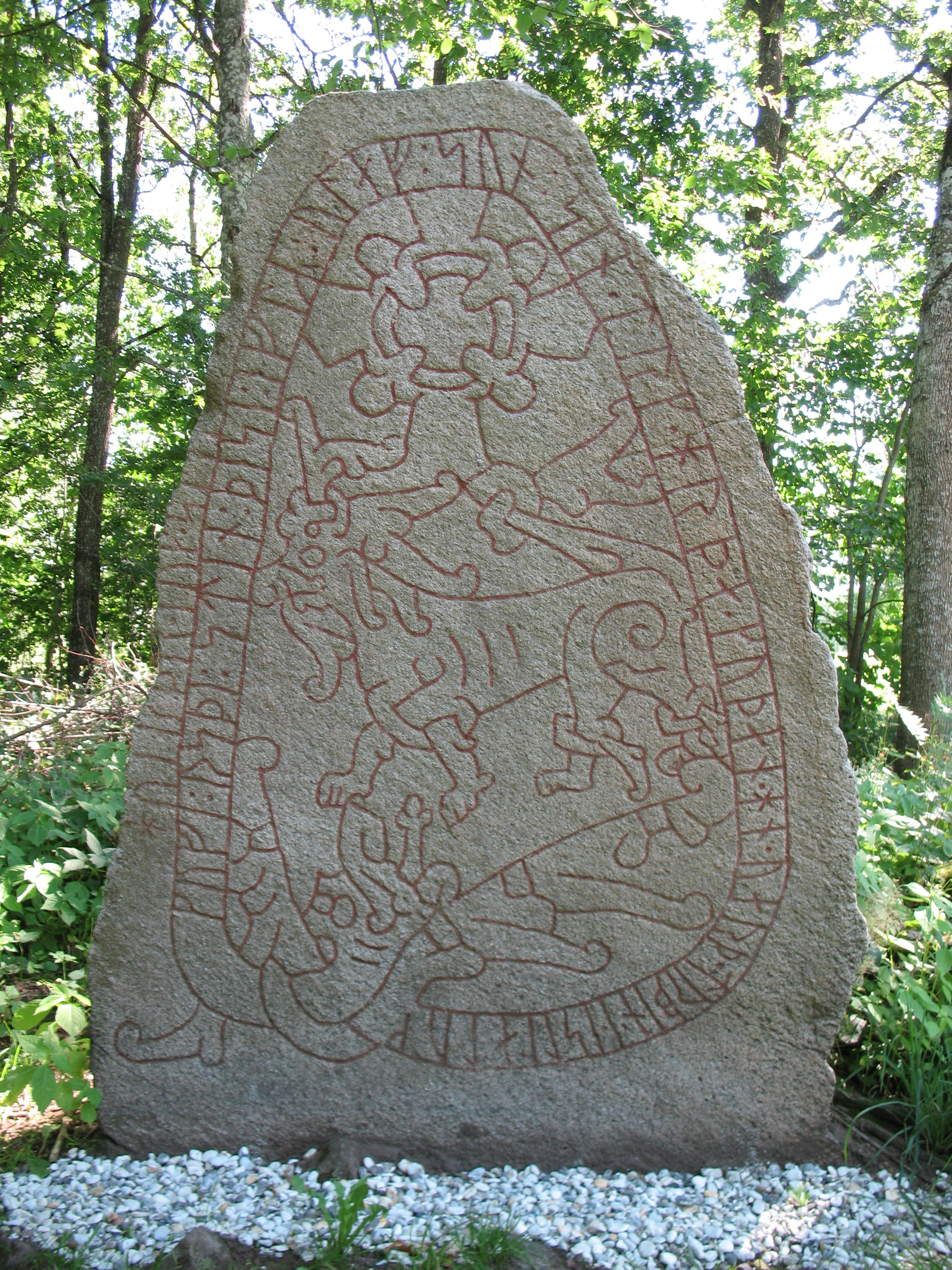
Frugården runestone in Sweden from 11th century mentions Estlatum "Estonian lands".

The name of Estonia (Estonian: Eesti [ˈeˑstʲi]) has a long and complex history. It has been connected to Aesti, first mentioned by Tacitus around AD 98. The name's modern geographical meaning comes from Eistland, Estia and Hestia in the medieval Scandinavian sources. Estonians adopted it as an endonym only in the mid-19th century.

== Etymology ==
=== Origins ===
The name has a complex history extending over two thousand years, and there is little consensus on which places and peoples it has referred to at different periods. Roman historian Tacitus in his Germania (ca. AD 98), mentioned Aestiorum gentes "Aestian tribes", and some historians believe that he was directly referring to Balts while others have proposed that the name applied to the whole Eastern Baltic. The word Aesti mentioned by Tacitus might derive from Latin Aestuarii meaning "Estuary Dwellers". Later geographically vague mentions include Aesti by Jordanes from the 6th century and Aisti by Einhard from the early 7th century. The last mention generally considered to be applying primarily to the southern parts of the Eastern-Baltic is Eastlanda in a description of Wulfstan’s travels from the 9th century. In the following centuries, views of the Eastern Baltic became more complex, and in the 11th century, Adam of Bremen mentions three islands, with Aestland being the northernmost.

Scandinavian sagas and the Viking runestones referring to Eistland were the earliest sources to use the name in its modern meaning. The sagas were composed in the 13th century on the basis of earlier oral tradition by historians like Snorri Sturluson. Estonia appears as Aistland in Gutasaga and as Eistland in Ynglinga saga, Óláfs saga Tryggvasonar, Haralds saga hárfagra, and Örvar-Odds saga. Snorri Sturluson retells in the Ynglinga saga a story about a semi-legendary Swedish warrior king Ingvar Harra who often spent time patrolling the shores of his kingdom fighting off Danes and Estonian vikings (Víkingr frá Eistland).

In present-day Sweden, the Frugården runestone from the 11th century mentions Estlatum "Estonian lands". Many other runestones in Sweden indicate that at the time there were close contacts with Estonia, because of the frequent references therein to personal names such as Æistfari ("traveller to Estonia"), Æistulfr ("Wolf of Estonians") and Æistr ("Estonian"). The toponym Estland/Eistland has been connected to Old Scandinavian eist, austr ("the east"), forming part of Austrvegr, or even sometimes identical with it.

The first mostly reliable chronicle data comes from Gesta Danorum by the 12th century historian Saxo Grammaticus, referring to Estonia as Hestia, Estia and its people as Estonum. The 12th century Arab geographer al-Idrisi from Sicily, who presumably had help of some informant at Jutland in Denmark, describes Astalānda, probably referring to Estonia and the Livonian regions of Latvia. From Scandinavian the name spread to German and later, following the rise of the Catholic Church, reached Latin, with Henry of Latvia in his Heinrici Cronicon Lyvoniae (ca. AD 1229) naming the region Estonia and its inhabitants Estones.

=== Adoption by Estonians ===
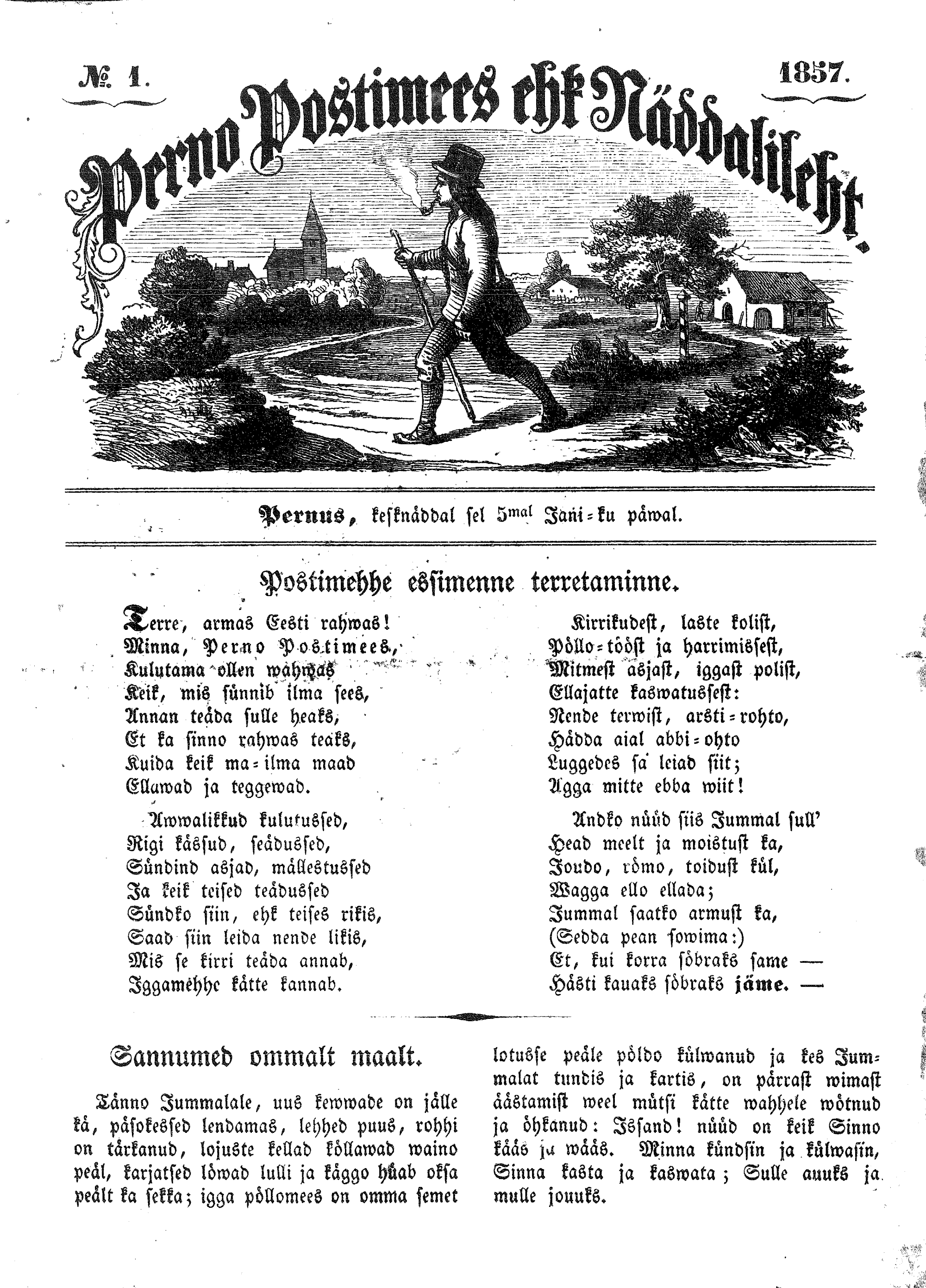
The first issue of Perno Postimees in 1857 welcomed readers with "Terre, armas Eesti rahwas!" ("Hello, dear Estonian people!")

The endonym maarahvas, literally meaning "land people" or "country folk", was used up until the mid-19th century. Its origins are unclear; there is a hypothesis of it originating from the prehistoric period, but no supporting evidence has been found. Another proposed explanation relates to its being a medieval loan-translation from German Landvolk. Although the name had been used earlier, Johann Voldemar Jannsen played a major role in popularisation of Eesti rahvas "Estonian people" among the Estonians themselves, during the Estonian national awakening. The first issue of his newspaper Perno Postimees in 1857 started with "Terre, armas Eesti rahwas!" meaning "Hello, dear Estonian people!".

== In other languages ==
Esthonia was a common alternative English spelling. In 1922, in response to a letter by Estonian diplomat Oskar Kallas raising the issue, the Royal Geographical Society agreed that the correct spelling was Estonia. Formal adoption took place at the government level only in 1926, with the United Kingdom and United States then adopting the spelling Estonia. In the same year this spelling was officially endorsed by the Estonian government, alongside Estonie in French, and Estland in German, Danish, Dutch, Norwegian, and Swedish.

In the Finnish language the neighbouring country Estonia is known as Viro, a toponym corresponding to the north Estonian region of Virumaa. Similarly, the corresponding Latvian language word Igaunija is thought to be related to the late medieval Ugandi County in the neighbouring southeastern region of Estonia.

== Bibliography ==
- Beyer, Jürgen (2011). "Are Folklorists Studying the Tales of the Folk?" (PDF). Folklore. 122 (1). Taylor & Francis: 35–54. doi:10.1080/0015587X.2011.537132. S2CID 144633422.
- Loit, Aleksander (2008). "Esthonia – Estonia?". Tuna (in Estonian). 38 (1). ISSN 1406-4030.
- Mägi, Marika (2018). In Austrvegr: The Role of the Eastern Baltic in Viking Age Communication across the Baltic Sea. BRILL. ISBN 9789004363816.
- Kasik, Reet (2011). Stahli mantlipärijad. Eesti keele uurimise lugu (in Estonian). Tartu University Press. ISBN 9789949196326.
- Paatsi, Vello (2012). ""Terre, armas eesti rahwas!": Kuidas maarahvast ja maakeelest sai eesti rahvas, eestlased ja eesti keel". Akadeemia (in Estonian). 24 (2). ISSN 0235-7771.
- Rätsep, Huno (2007). "Kui kaua me oleme olnud eestlased?" (PDF). Oma Keel (in Estonian). 14. ISSN 1406-6599.
- Tamm, Marek; Kaljundi, Linda; Jensen, Carsten Selch (2016). Crusading and Chronicle Writing on the Medieval Baltic Frontier: A Companion to the Chronicle of Henry of Livonia. Routledge. ISBN 9781317156796.
- Tvauri, Andres (2012). Laneman, Margot (ed.). The Migration Period, Pre-Viking Age, and Viking Age in Estonia. Tartu University Press. ISBN 9789949199365. ISSN 1736-3810.
