= Estonia (organization) =

Organization based in Estonia

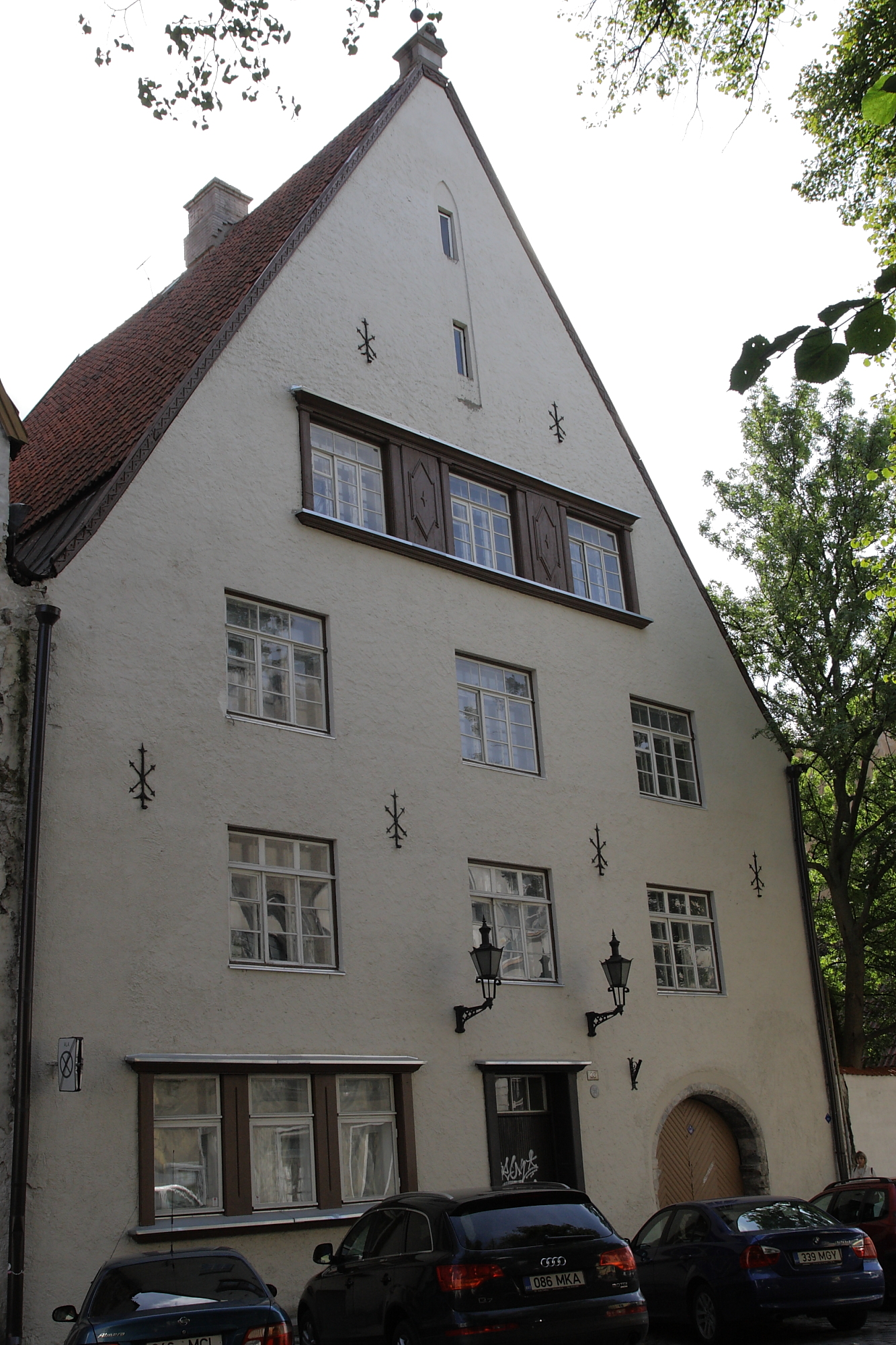
Estonia Society operated in this building in the 1870s

Estonia (Estonia Selts) is an Estonian society of culture, founded in 1865.

The society participated in the Estonian Song Festival in 1869.

The Estonian Song Festivals in 1896 and in 1910 were organised by this society along with another society called Lootus.

In 1906, the society established the professional theatre called “Estonia”.

The society initially existed until 1940, and was re-established in 1990.
