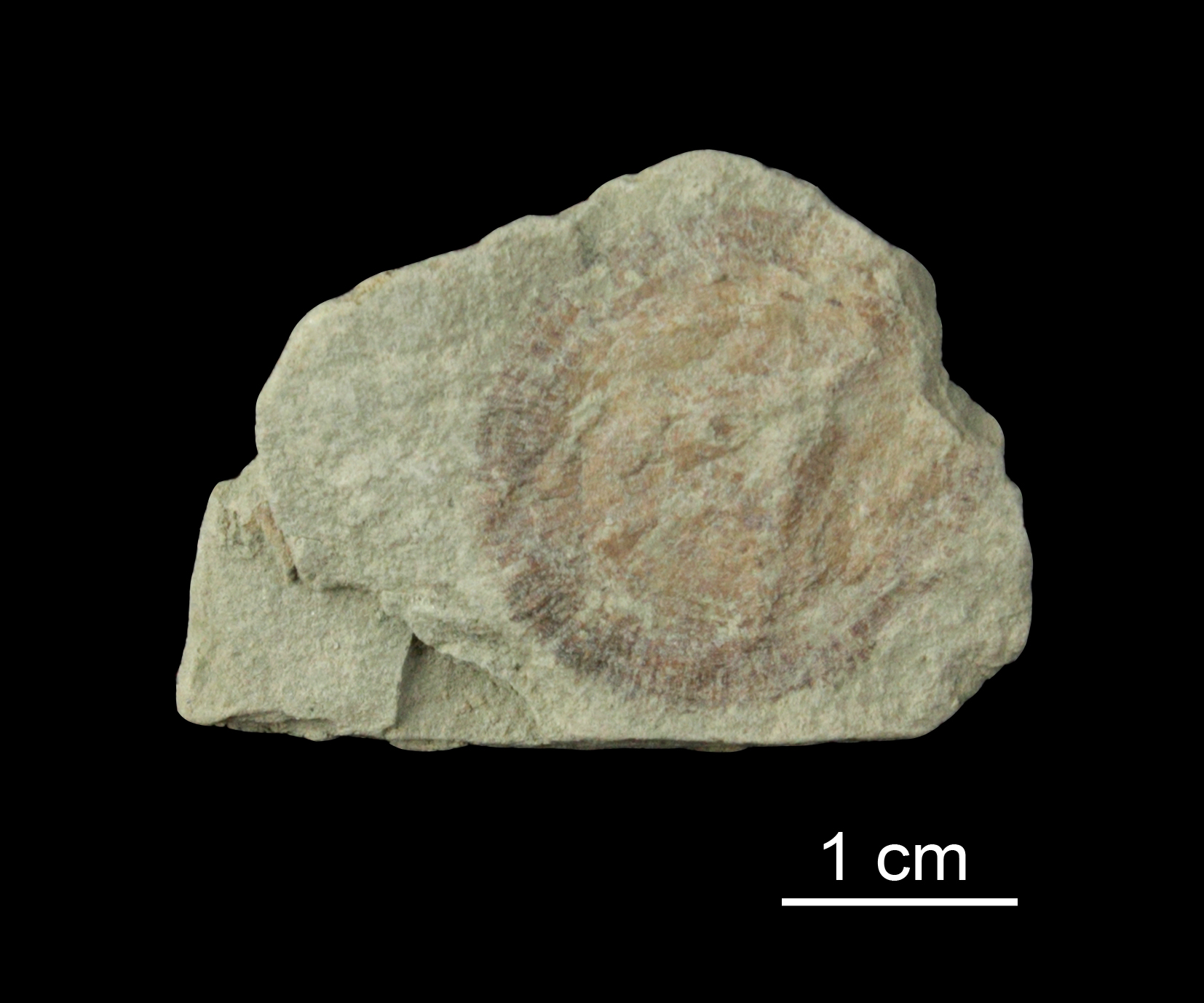
- Specimen of E. discinoides found near Kunda, Suhkrumägi outcrop

Scientific classification
- Kingdom: Animalia
- (unranked): ?Bilateria
- Genus: †Estoniadiscus Peel, 2003

Binomial name
- †Estoniadiscus discinoides (Schmidt, 1888)

Synonyms
- Scenella discinoides Schmidt, 1888a

= Estoniadiscus =

Estoniadiscus Temporal range: Early Cambrian, Nemakit-Daldynian–Atdabanian

Extinct genus of animals, unknown classification

Estoniadiscus is an extinct genus of animal of unknown classification, possibly belonging to Bilateria, from the Early Cambrian (Nemakit-Daldynian–Atdabanian) of Estonia. Originally described as a species of Scenella in 1888a, it was redescribed as a possible stem-brachiopod in 2003.
