= Geography of Estonia =

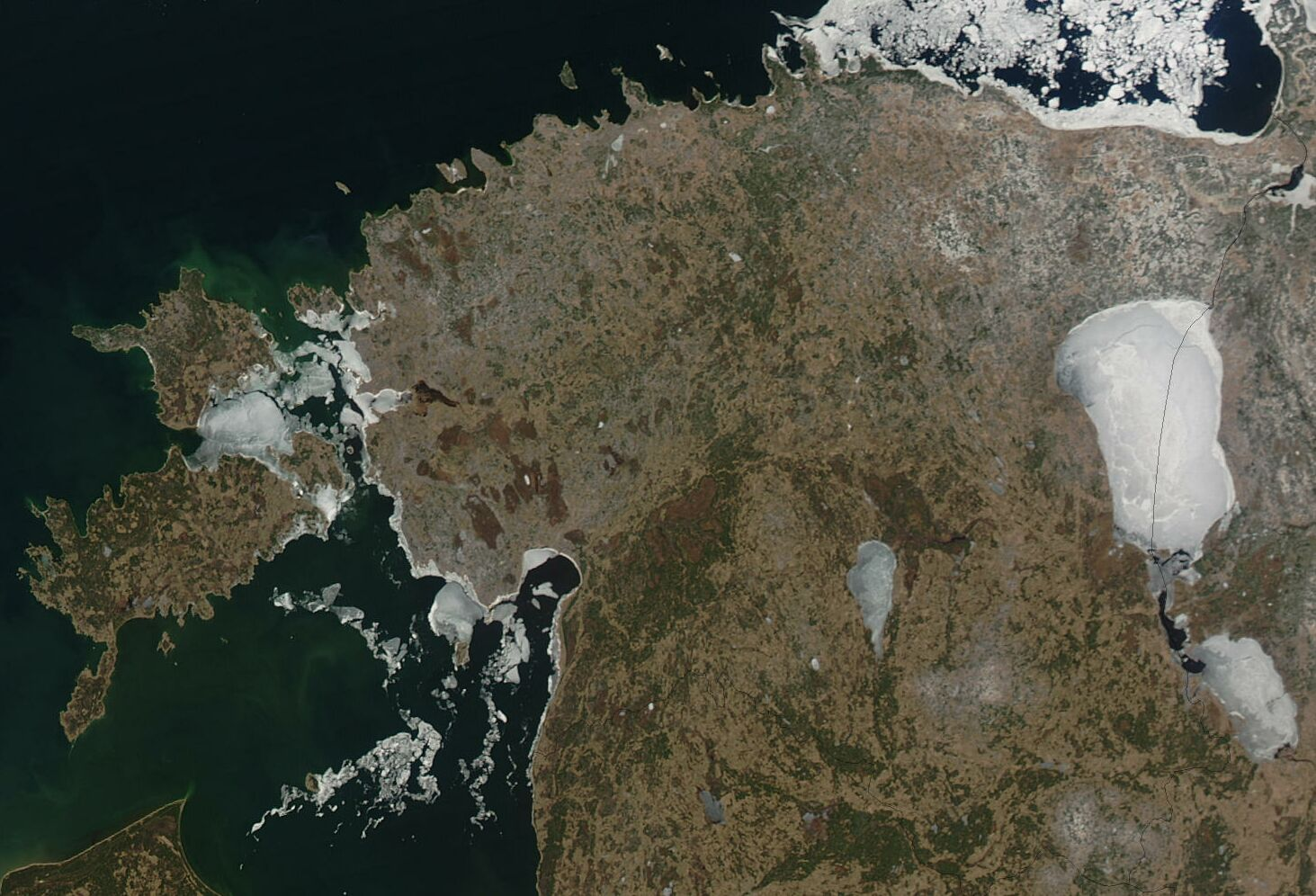
- Continent: Europe
- Region: Northern Europe
- Coordinates: 59°00′N 26°00′E
- Area
  - Total: 45,339 km^{2} (17,505 sq mi)
  - Land: 95.4%
  - Water: 4.6%
- Coastline: 3,794 km (2,357 mi)
- Borders: Total land borders: 657 km (408 mi)
- Highest point: Suur Munamägi; 317 m (1,040 ft)
- Lowest point: Baltic Sea; 0 meters
- Longest river: Võhandu; 162 km (101 mi)
- Largest lake: Lake Peipus; 3,555 km^{2} (1,373 mi^{2})
- Exclusive economic zone: 36,992 km^{2} (14,283 mi^{2})

Between 57.3 and 59.5 latitude and 21.5 and 28.1 longitude, Estonia lies on the eastern coast of the Baltic Sea on the level northwestern part of the rising East European Platform. Estonia's continental mainland is bordered to the north by the Gulf of Finland (part of the Baltic Sea) across from Finland, to the east by Lake Peipus and Russia, and to the south by Latvia. Besides the part of the European continent, Estonian territory also includes the larger islands of Saaremaa and Hiiumaa, and over 2,200 other islands and islets in the Baltic Sea, off the western and northern shores of the country's mainland.

Average elevation in Estonia reaches 50 m (164 ft).

The climate is maritime, wet, with moderate winters and cool summers. Oil shale and limestone deposits, along with forests which cover 47% of the land, play key economic roles in this generally resource-poor country. Estonia boasts over 1,500 lakes, numerous bogs, and 3,794 kilometers of coastline marked by numerous bays, straits, and inlets.

== Geographic features ==
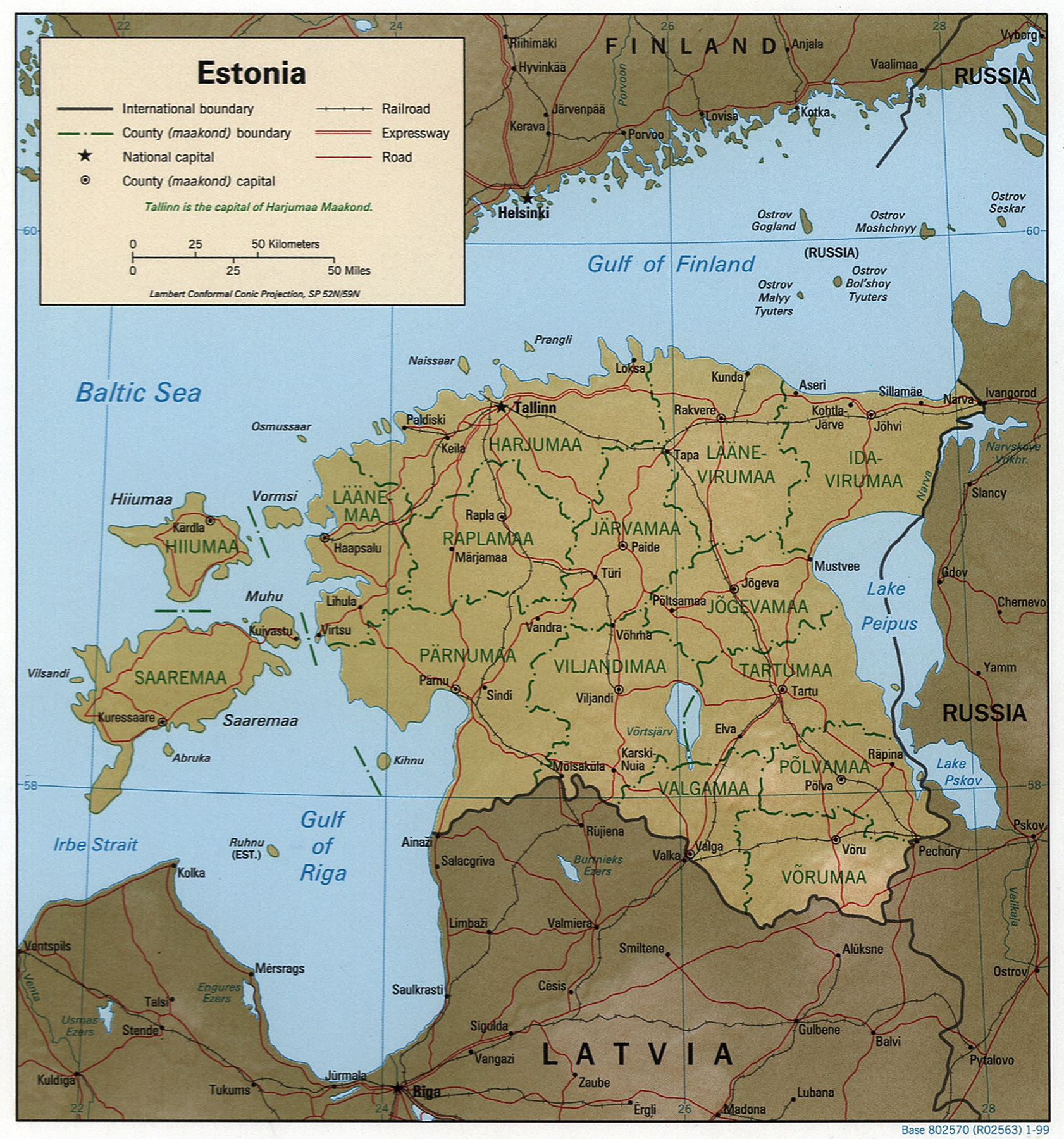
Map of Estonia

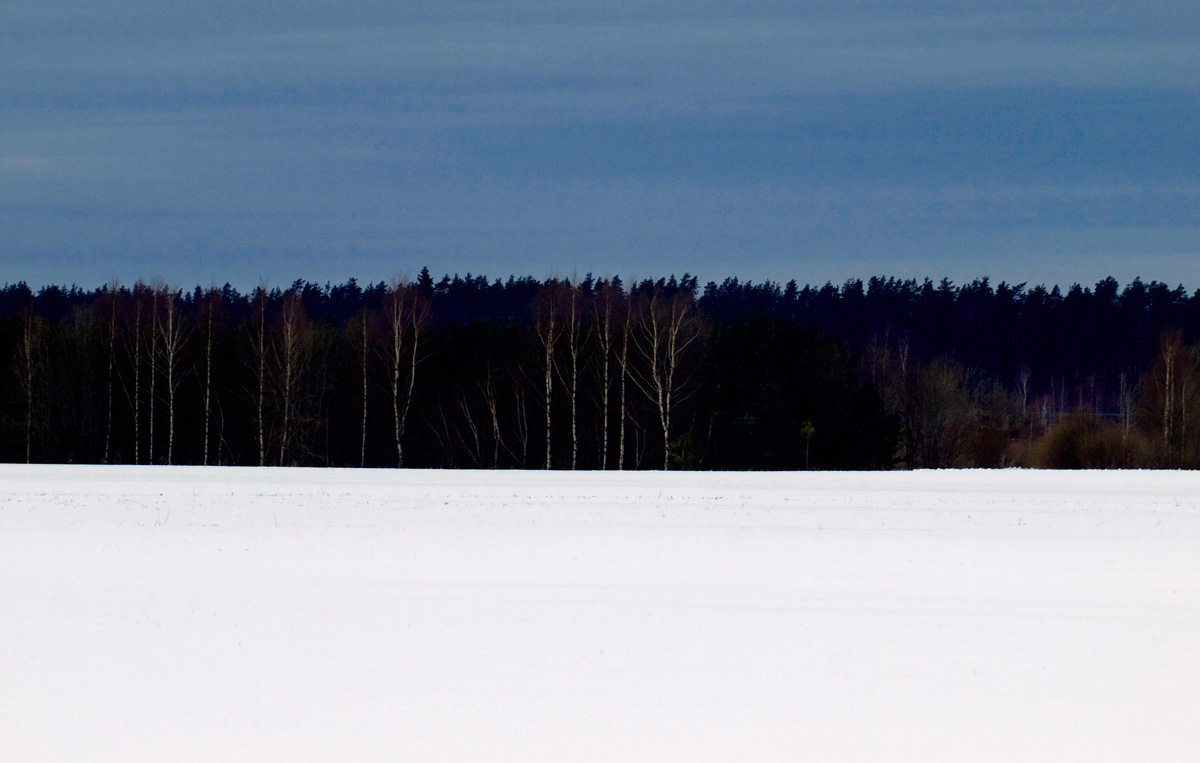
Typical landscape of the Estonian forest in winter

Estonia is a flat country covering 45,339 km^{2} (17,505 sq mi), of which internal waters comprise 4.6%. Estonia has a long, shallow coastline (3,794 km or 2,357 mi) along the Baltic Sea, with 1,520 islands dotting the shore. The two largest islands are Saaremaa (literally, island land), at 2,673 km^{2} (1,032 mi^{2}), and Hiiumaa, at 989 km^{2} (382 mi^{2}). The two islands are favorite Estonian vacation spots. The country's highest point, Suur Munamägi (Egg Mountain), is in the hilly southeast and reaches 318 m (1,043 ft) above sea level. Estonia is covered by about 18,000 km^{2} (6,950 mi^{2}) of forest. Arable land amounts to about 9,260 km^{2} (3,575 mi^{2}). Meadows cover about 2,520 km^{2} (973 mi^{2}), and pastureland covers about 1,810 km^{2} (699 mi^{2}). There are more than 1,400 natural and artificial lakes in Estonia. The largest of them, Lake Peipus (3,555 km^{2} or 1,373 mi^{2}), forms much of the border between Estonia and Russia. Located in central Estonia, Võrtsjärv is the second-largest lake (270 km^{2} or 104 mi^{2}). The Narva and Emajõgi are among the most important of the country's many rivers.

A small, recent cluster of meteorite craters, the largest of which is called Kaali are found on the Estonian island of Saaremaa. The impact may have been witnessed by the Iron Age inhabitants of the area.

Estonia has a temperate climate, with four seasons of near-equal length. Average temperatures range from 16.3 °C (61.3 °F) on the Baltic islands to 17.1 °C (62.8 °F) inland in July, the warmest month, and from −3.5 °C (25.7 °F) on the Baltic islands to −7.6 °C (18.3 °F) inland in February, the coldest month. Precipitation averages 568 mm (22.4 in) per year and is heaviest in late summer.

Estonia's land border with Latvia runs 333 km (207 mi); the Russian border runs 324 km (201 mi). From 1920 to 1945, Estonia's border with Russia, set by the 1920 Tartu Peace Treaty, extended beyond the Narva river in the northeast and beyond the town of Petseri in the southeast. This territory, amounting to some 2,300 km^{2} (888 mi^{2}), was transferred to Soviet Russia at the end of World War II.

=== Geology ===
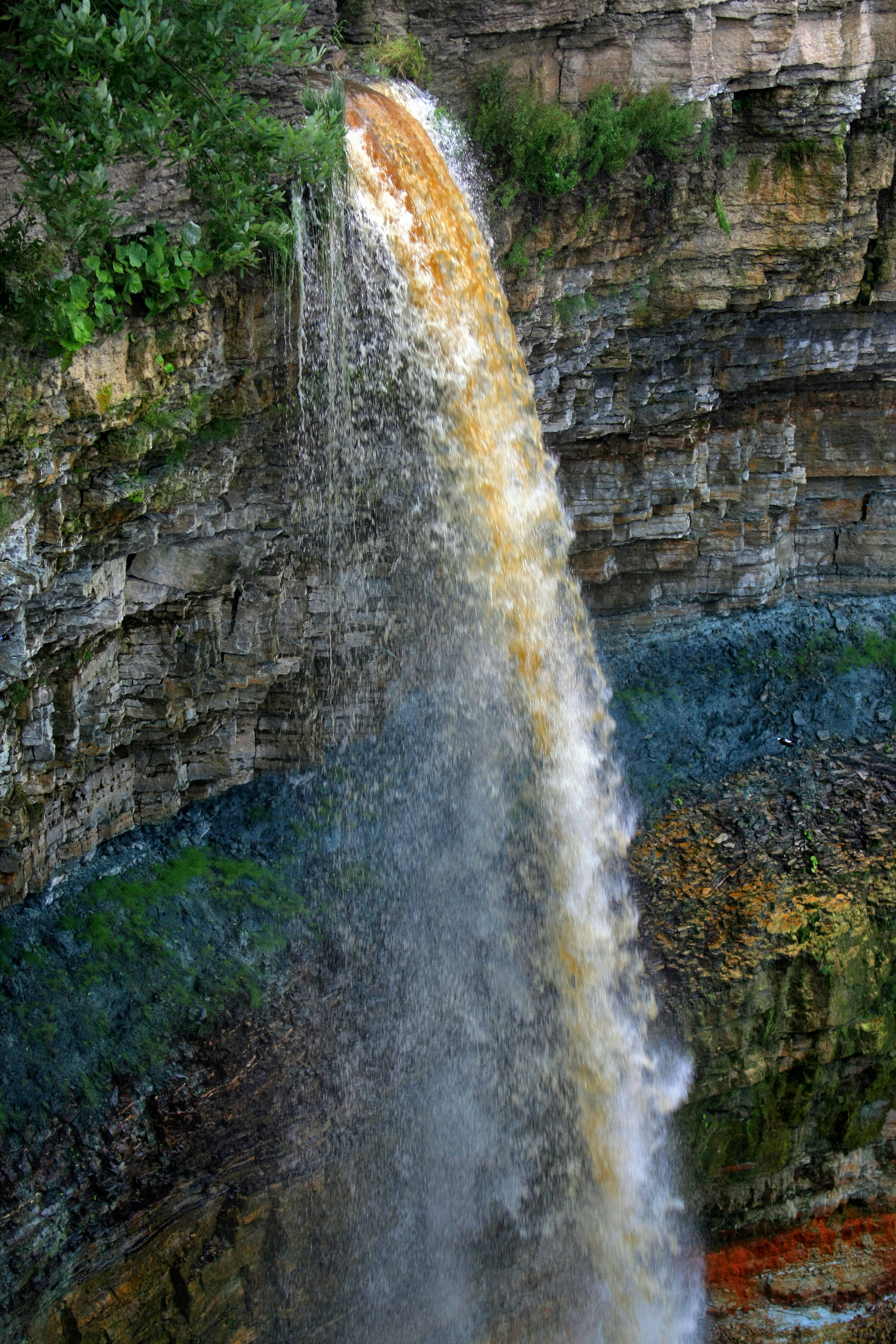
The cliff at Valaste Falls illustrates the stratigraphy of various geological eras.

Estonia is located on the northwestern part of the East European Platform, bordering the Fennoscandian Shield. Estonia's bedrock consists of two main layers: the crystalline basement and the sedimentary cover. These are further classified into three distinct geological complexes. The crystalline basement, composed of granites, gneisses, and other crystalline rocks, formed during the Proterozoic. This is overlain by a sedimentary cover of Paleozoic rocks, including limestones and sandstones. Above this, a quaternary surface layer is mainly composed of unconsolidated sediments such as gravels, sands, and clays, which formed in the Cenozoic.

== Fauna ==
There live 65 different species of mammals in the Estonian forests. There are an estimated 700 brown bears, over 150 wolves, 400 lynxes, 14,000–16,000 beavers, 3,400 wild boars, 10,000–11,000 moose and 120,000–130,000 deer. There are also red deer and other wild animals.

== Flora ==
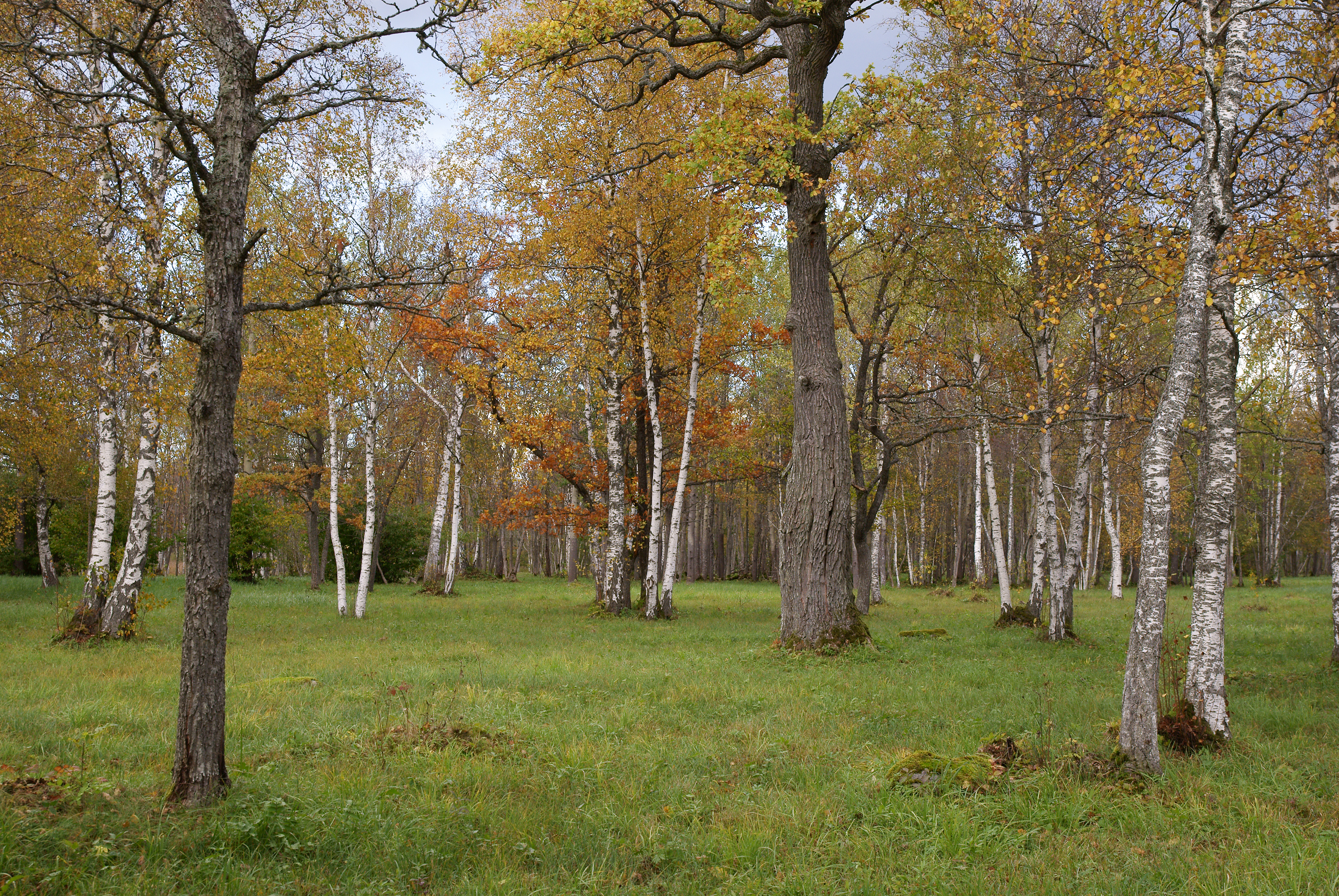
In Laelatu meadow, there have been found 76 species of plants in 1 m^{2}. That is the 2nd largest number of species per m^{2} in the world.

== Environmental issues ==
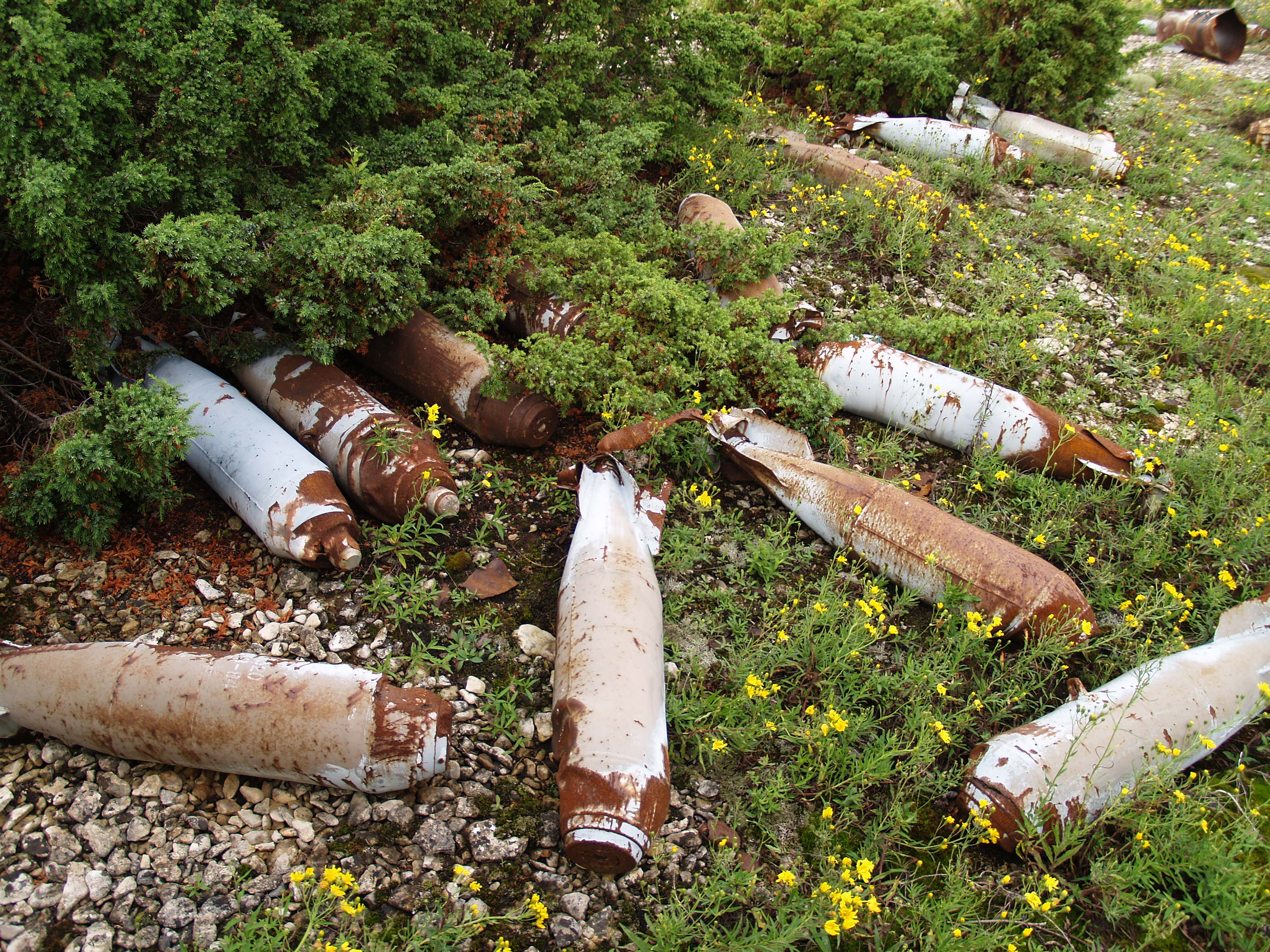
The Soviet Army used the Pakri Islands as sites for aerial bombardment. The collection and destruction of thousands of Soviet explosive devices was mostly complete by 1997.

One of the most burdensome legacies of the 1944–1991 Soviet occupation of Estonia is widespread environmental pollution. The worst offender in this regard was the Soviet Army. Across military installations covering more than 800 square kilometres (310 sq mi) of Estonian territory, the army dumped hundreds of thousands of tons of jet fuel into the ground, improperly disposed of toxic chemicals, and discarded outdated explosives and weapons in coastal and inland waters.

In the 1990s, during the army's withdrawal from Estonia, extensive damage was done to discarded buildings and equipment. In October 1993, the Estonian Ministry of Environment issued a preliminary report summing up part of the degradation it had surveyed thus far. The report described the worst damage as having been done to Estonia's topsoil and underground water supply by the systematic dumping of jet fuel at six Soviet Army air bases. At the air base near Tapa, site of the worst damage, officials estimated that 6 square kilometres (2.3 sq mi) of land were covered by a layer of fuel; 11 square kilometres (4.2 sq mi) of underground water were said to be contaminated. The water in the surrounding area was undrinkable, and was sometimes set fire by locals to provide heat during the winter. With Danish help, Estonian crews began cleaning up the site, although they estimated the likely cost to be as much as 4 million EEK. The Ministry of Environment assigned a monetary cost of more than 10 billion EEK to the damage to the country's topsoil and water supply. However, the ministry was able to allocate only 5 million EEK in 1993 for cleanup operations.

In a 1992 government report to the United Nations Conference on the Environment and Development, Estonia detailed other major environmental concerns. For instance, for several consecutive years Estonia had led the world in the production of sulfur dioxide per capita. Nearly 75% of Estonia's air pollution was reported to come from two oil shale-based thermal power stations operating near Narva. The mining of oil shale in northeastern Estonia has also left large mounds of limestone tailings dotting the region. Near the town of Sillamäe, site of a former uranium enrichment plant, about 1,200 tons of uranium and about 750 tons of thorium had been dumped into a reservoir on the shore of the Gulf of Finland. This was said to have caused severe health problems among area residents. In the coastal town of Paldiski, the removal of waste left by Soviet Army nuclear reactors was also a major concern. The combined cost of environmental cleanup at both towns was put at more than EEK3.5 billion.

Natural hazards: flooding occurs frequently in the spring in certain areas

Environment – current issues: air polluted with sulfur dioxide from oil-shale burning power plants in northeast; however, the amounts of pollutants emitted to the air have fallen dramatically and the pollution load of wastewater at purification plants has decreased substantially due to improved technology and environmental monitoring; Estonia has more than 1,400 natural and manmade lakes, the smaller of which in agricultural areas need to be monitored; coastal seawater is polluted in certain locations.

Environment – international agreements:
party to: Air Pollution, Air Pollution-Heavy Metals, Air Pollution-Nitrogen Oxides, Air Pollution-Persistent Organic Pollutants, Air Pollution-Sulphur 85, Air Pollution-Volatile Organic Compounds, Antarctic Treaty, Biodiversity, Climate Change, Climate Change-Kyoto Protocol, Climate Change-Paris Agreement, Comprehensive Nuclear Test Ban, Desertification, Endangered Species, Environmental Modification, Hazardous Wastes, Law of the Sea, Marine Dumping-London Protocol, Ozone Layer Protection, Ship Pollution, Tropical Timber 2006, Wetlands, Whaling

== Area and boundaries ==
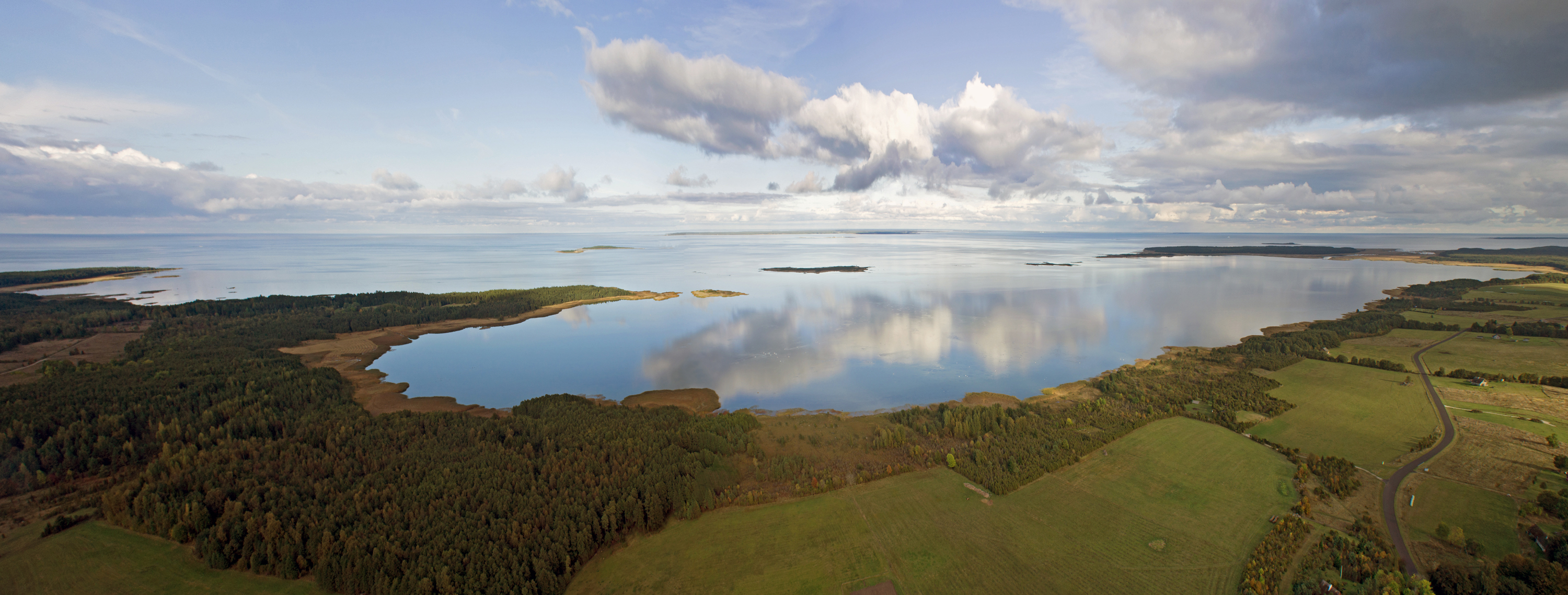
Hellamaa bay in Hiiumaa.

Area:
total: 45,228 square kilometres (17,463 sq mi)
land: 42,338 square kilometres (16,347 sq mi)
water: 2,840 square kilometres (1,100 sq mi)
note: includes 1,520 islands in the Baltic Sea

Land boundaries:
total: 657 km (408 mi)
border countries: Latvia 333 km (207 mi), Russia 324 km (201 mi)

Coastline: 3,794 km (2,357 mi)

Maritime claims:
territorial sea: 12 nmi (22.2 km; 13.8 mi)

exclusive economic zone: limits as agreed to by Estonia, Finland, Latvia, Sweden, border treaty with Russia not ratified as of May 2021.

Elevation extremes:
lowest point: Baltic Sea 0 m
highest point: Suur Munamägi 318 metres (1,043 ft)

=== Geographical (landscape) areas ===
- Northern Estonia (roughly equivalent to Põhja-Eesti maastikuvaldkond (:et), which includes the capital city Tallinn)
- Southern Estonia
- Western Estonia
- Eastern Estonia

== Resources and land use ==
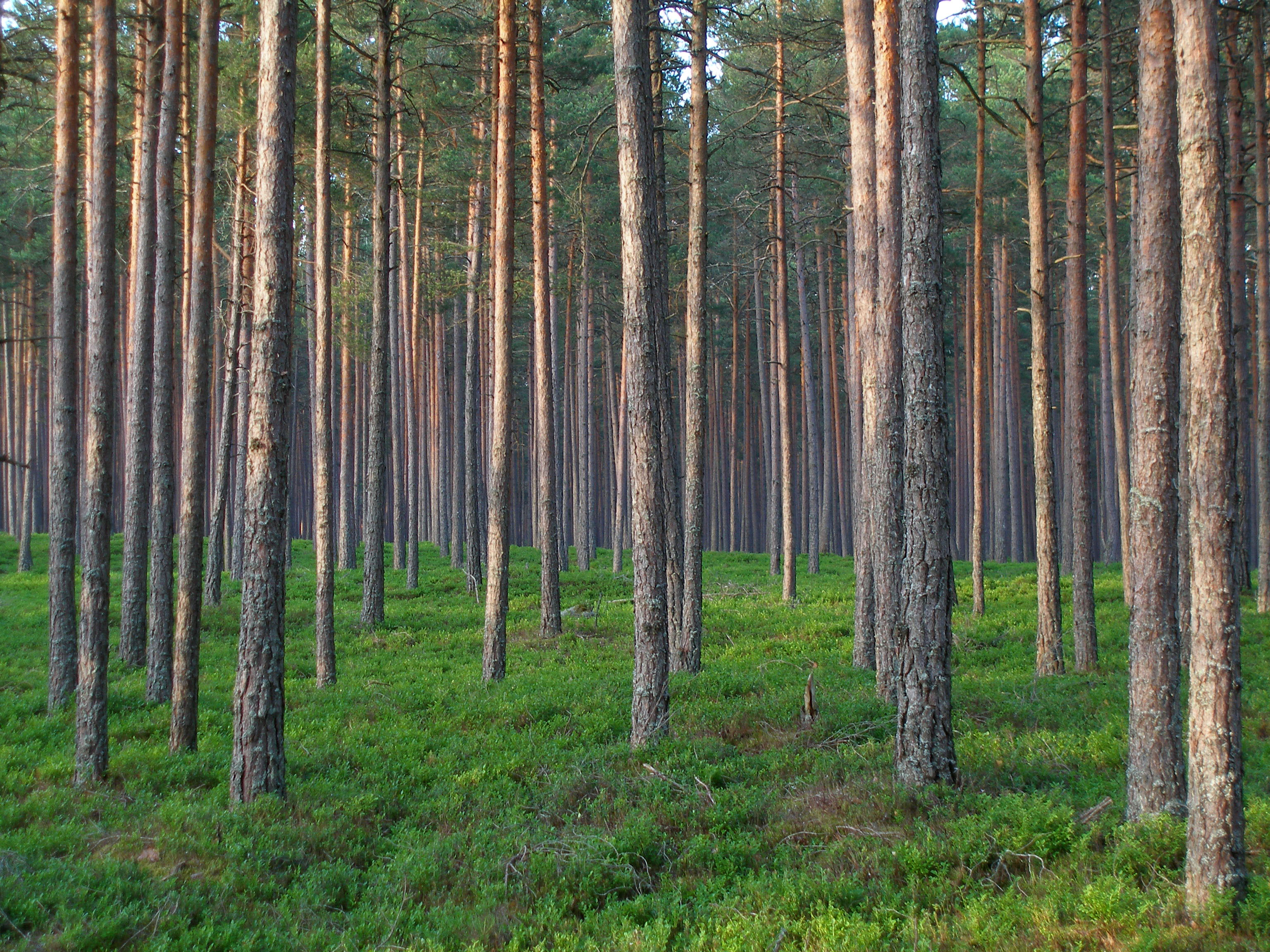
Forests cover more than half of the territory of Estonia.

Natural resources: oil shale (kukersite), peat, rare earth elements, phosphorite, clay, limestone, sand, dolomite, arable land, sea mud

Land use (2018 est.):

- agricultural land: 22.2% (14% arable land, 0.1% permanent crops, 7.2% permanent pasture)
- forest: 52.1%
- other: 25.7%

Irrigated land: 40 km^{2} (15 sq mi)

Total renewable water resources: 12.806 km^{3} (3.072 cu mi) (2017 est.)

== See also ==
- Extreme points of Estonia
- Climate of Estonia
