= International rankings of Estonia =

These are the international rankings of Estonia

== International rankings ==
Rankings
Name	Year	Place	Out of #	Reference
Global Peace Index – Institute for Economics and Peace	2017	36th	163	
CIA World Factbook – GDP per capita (PPP)	2016	64th	230	
CIA World Factbook – life expectancy	2016	85th	224	
World Economic Forum – Enabling Trade Index ranking	2016	14th	136	
Yale University / Columbia University – Environmental Performance Index	2016	8th	180	
The Economist Intelligence Unit – e-readiness	2010	25th	70	
The Economist Intelligence Unit – Global Peace Index	2017	36th	163	
United States Patent and Trademark Office's list of patents by country	2015	61st	183	
Save the Children – Mothers' Index Rank	2015	27th	179	
Save the Children – Women's Index Rank	2011	17th	164	
Save the Children – Children's Index Rank	2011	17th	164	
Wall Street Journal / The Heritage Foundation – Index of Economic Freedom	2017	6th	180	^{[unfit]}
United Nations – Human Development Index	2016	30th	188	
World Economic Forum – Global Competitiveness Report 2016–2017	2017	30th	138	
World Economic Forum – The Global Gender Gap Report 2016	2016	22nd	144	
World Bank – Ease of Doing Business Index	2017	12th	190	
Reporters Without Borders – Worldwide Press Freedom Index	2017	12th	180	
Transparency International – Corruption Perceptions Index	2016	22nd	176	
The Economist Intelligence Unit – Index of Democracy	2007	33rd	167	
Privacy International – Privacy index (EU and 11 other selected countries)	2006	28th	36	
New Economics Foundation – Happy Planet Index	2006	119th	178	
The Economist Intelligence Unit – Quality-of-life index	2005	68th	111	
Save the Children – % seats in the national government held by women	2004	1st (47%)	141	
World Health Organization – suicide rates by country		33rd	183	
NationMaster's index of civil and political liberties		16th	140	
BookRetreats.com – Global Relaxation Index	2025	8th	76	[26]
World Intellectual Property Organization – Global Innovation Index	2026	17th	139	
