= .ee =

Top-level Internet domain for Estonia

- Introduced: 3 June 1992
- TLD type: Country code top-level domain
- Status: Active
- Registry: Estonian Internet Foundation
- Intended use: Entities connected with Estonia
- Actual use: Very popular in Estonia, now available globally.
- Registered domains: 160,059 (2023-08-11)
- Structure: Registrations are taken directly at the second level, or at the third level beneath various second-level labels
- Dispute policies: Domain Disputes Committee
- Registry website: Estonian Internet Foundation

.ee is the internet country code top-level domain (ccTLD) of Estonia, operated by the Estonian Internet Foundation.

== Second-level domain names ==
The Estonian Internet Foundation recognizes 4 second-level "general" domains under the top-level .ee domain, using them to group websites with "similar traits":

.com.ee – companies (incorporated entities) as defined in the Commercial Code,
.pri.ee – individuals,
.fie.ee – self-employed people (sole proprietors) as defined in the Commercial Code,
.med.ee – medical/health care institutions.

In addition, as of January 2026, the previous administrator (EENet) still supports several other second-level domains:

.edu.ee – educational institutions and projects,
.lib.ee – libraries,
.org.ee – non-profit organizations and projects,
.vil.ee – institutions and projects operating in the field of education, science or culture.

== History ==
The top-level domain .ee was introduced in 1992 and was operated by EENet until July 2010. The administrator of the .ee domain was Endel Lippmaa.

There was a limit of one domain name per legal entity, and registrations of additional names to protect trademarks were specifically denied. From the pre-2010 FAQ:

The domain name has no trademark status. As domains under .ee are meant to be the institution's identification on the Internet (similar to the register code in the commercial register), the registration of additional domains to protect a trademark or a name form is not possible.

Valid registrations were free of charge.

=== Domain reform ===
On 5 July 2010, the Estonian Internet Foundation (EIF) (Note: Sometimes abbreviated EIS for its Estonian name, Eesti Internet SA.) took over .ee ccTLD registry functions from EENet. Instead of directly handling domain name requests, the EIF created a new system in which they accredit a number of domain name registrars, and the domain name registrars then actually register new domains.

The EIF also promulgated a number of new rules, among them:

- Individuals could now register .ee domains, not just businesses and organizations.
- Foreign people and entities could now register .ee domains.
- People and organization can now register more than one domain.
- Registration is no longer free but requires payment, with prices "determined on the open market".

ICANN officially approved the re-delegation and recognized the Estonian Internet Foundation as the sponsor of the .ee top-level domain three years later.

=== Criticism of the domain reform ===
A group of internet security specialists criticized the changeover from EENet to the Estonian Internet Foundation and appealed to the government to step in. In the appeal, the authors Tõnu Samuel and Jaan Jänesmäe claim that the EIF's proposed fees were "insanely high" and "the highest in Europe". (Note: All quotations from the appeal are taken from the machine translation of the Estonian appeal.) They also claimed the EIF had "consistently ignored the real needs of the Estonian internet community" and urged the EIF board to resign. The appeal was signed by 22 signatories and supported by 829 Facebook supporters. In October 2010, the authors and supporters of the appeal founded the Estonian Internet Community (Estonian: Eesti Interneti Kogukond) NGO. Later that year, it noted on its blog that several of its members had decided that directly pressuring the EIF was not effective and thus had independently written e-mails to IANA asking them to step in to resolve the controversy.

=== After the reform ===
On 13 June 2011, the registration of domains with diacritics (õ, ä, ö, ü, š and ž) was enabled for the .ee domain, allowing URLs which covered the entire Estonian alphabet.

On 6 January 2014, EIF announced that it had completed the work to allow .ee sites to use DNSSEC.

In 2023, several one-character domain names, which had previously been reserved, were auctioned off. "s.ee" fetched €41,000, making it the most expensive domain auctioned off by the Estonian Internet Foundation at that time.

== Domain hacks ==
Several companies and organizations whose names end in "ee" have registered domain hack domains using the .ee TLD. Examples include:

- Linktree, a social media landing page service, uses the .ee domain (linktr.ee).
- Adventist World Radio, the broadcast mission arm of the Seventh-day Adventist Church, also uses the .ee domain (refug.ee).
- Shopee, an online retail site, uses the .ee domain for its link shortener service (shp.ee).
- Jakarta EE, a set of specifications for the Java software platform, uses jakarta.ee as its website address.
