= Science and technology in China =

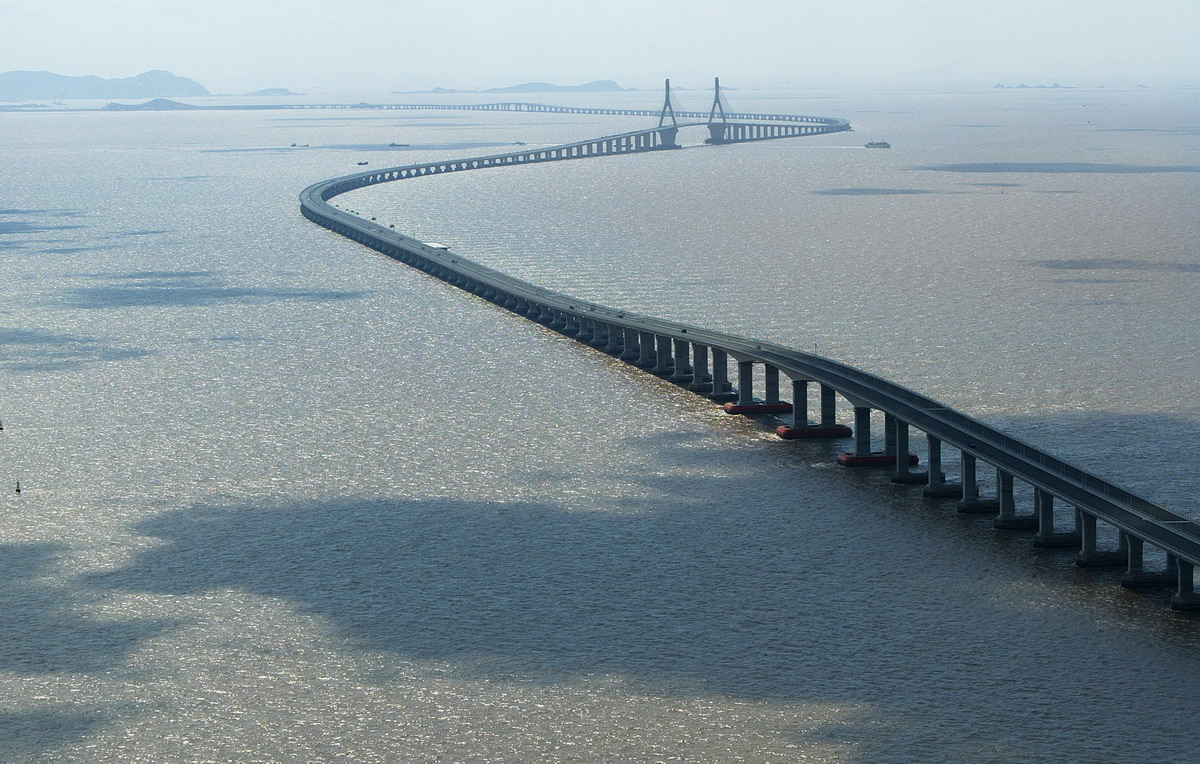
Donghai Bridge

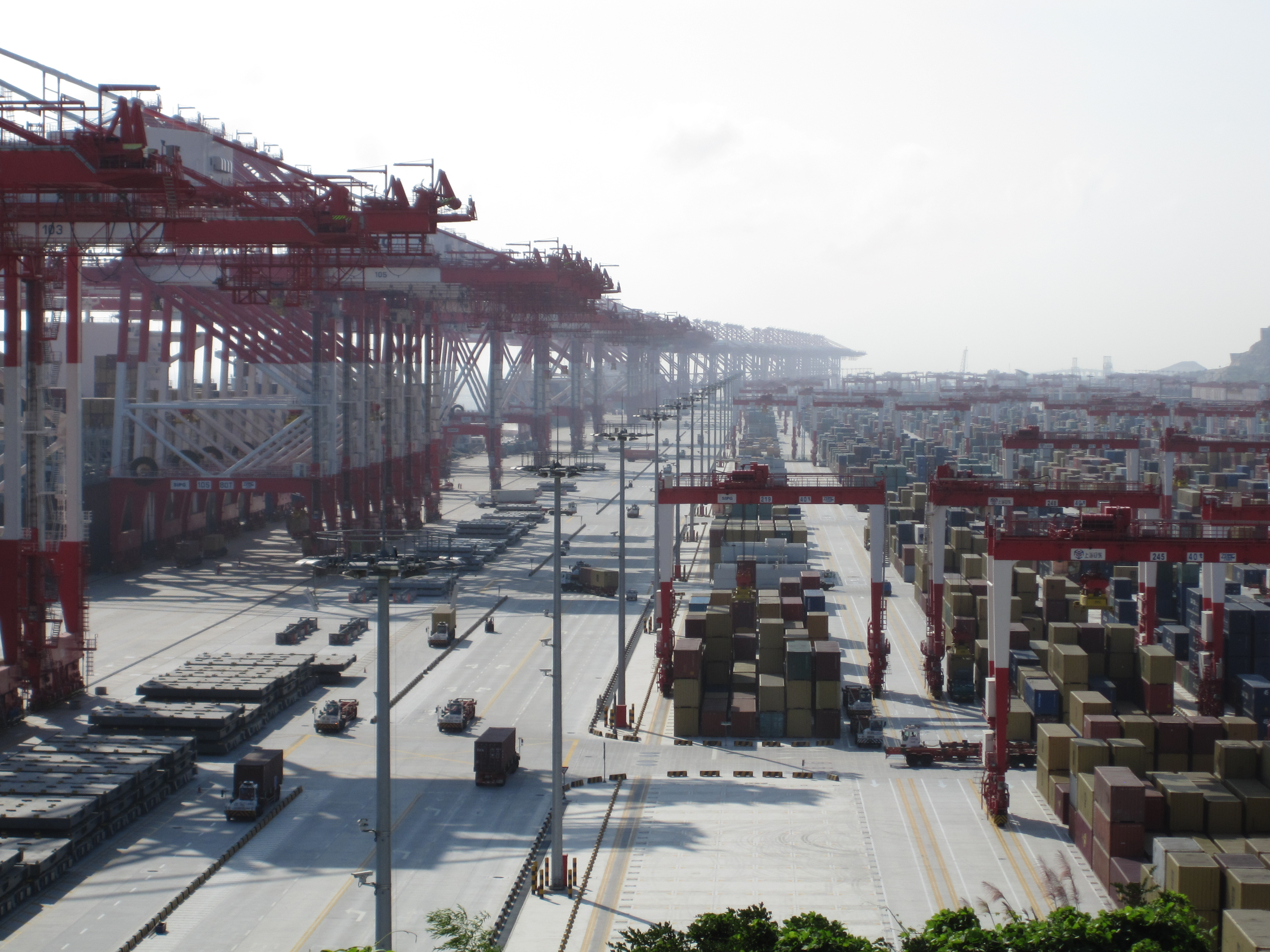
Building infrastructure has been a major task for Chinese engineering during the past decades. This is the 32.5-kilometer (20.2 mi)-long Donghai Bridge, connecting mainland Shanghai to the offshore Yangshan Port – one part of the Port of Shanghai, the world's busiest container port.

Science and technology in the People's Republic of China have developed rapidly from the 1980s to the 2020s, with major scientific and technological progress over the last four decades. From the 1980s to the 1990s, the government of the People's Republic of China successively launched the 863 Program and the "Strategy to Revitalize the Country Through Science and Education", which greatly promoted the development of China's science and technological institutions.

As per the Global Innovation Index in 2025, China was considered one of the most innovative in the world, ranking 10th globally, third in the Asia & Oceania region after South Korea and Singapore, China remained in the same position according to the index of 2026.

== History ==
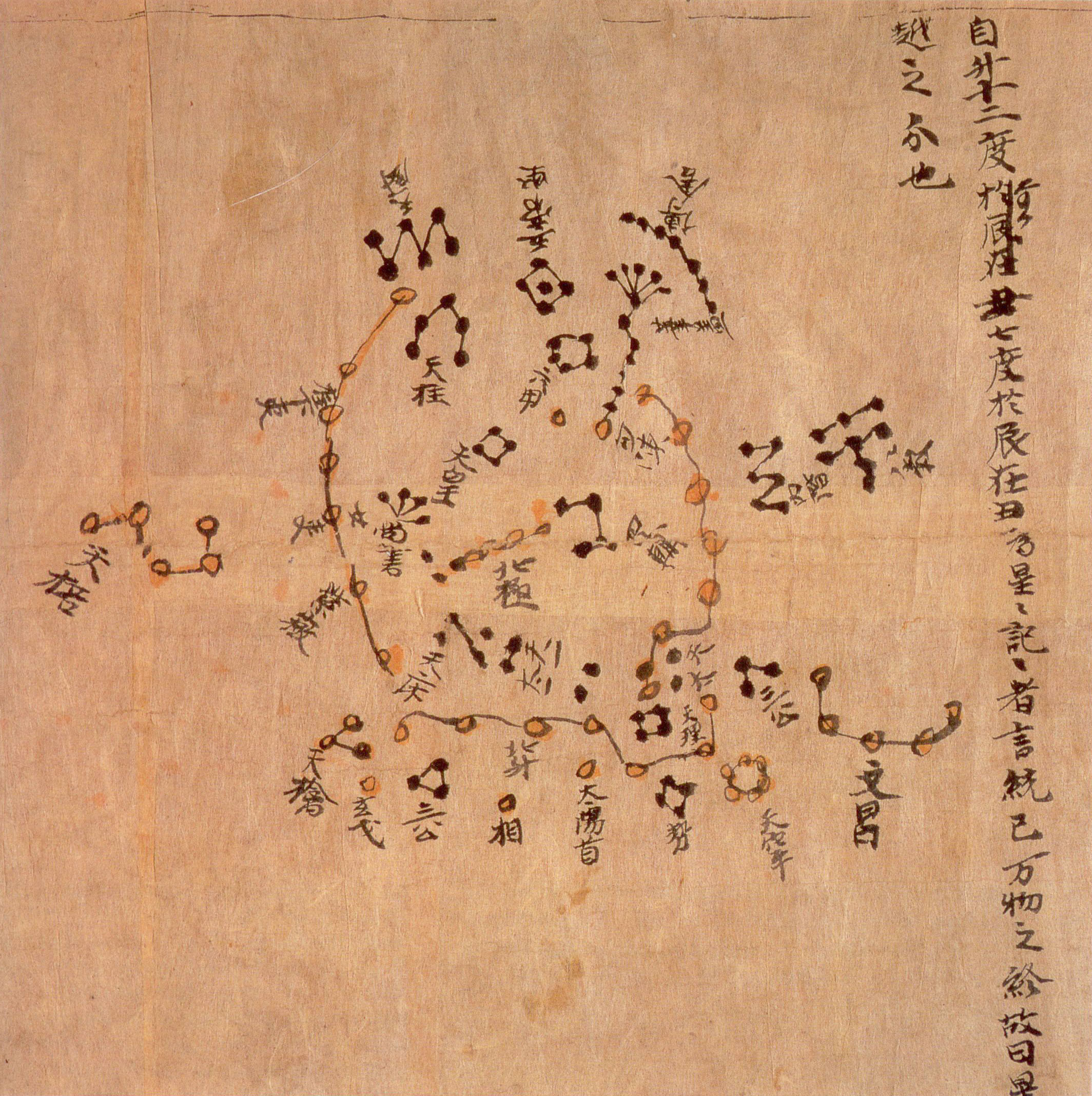
The Dunhuang map, a star map showing the North Polar region. c. 700. The Dunhuang Star map is to date the world's oldest complete preserved star atlas. The whole set of star maps contains over 1,300 stars.

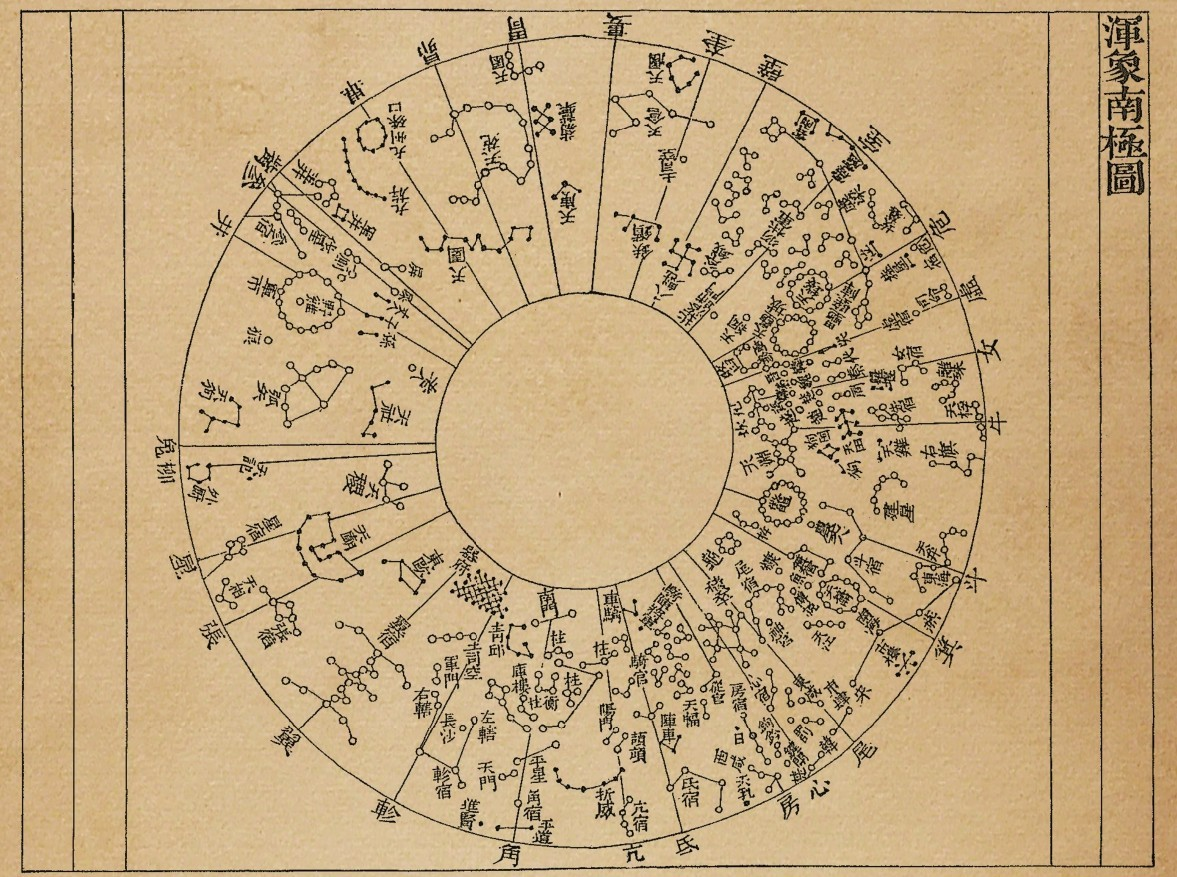
Star map of the south polar projection for Su's celestial globe, Xin Yi Xiang Fa Yao, 1092

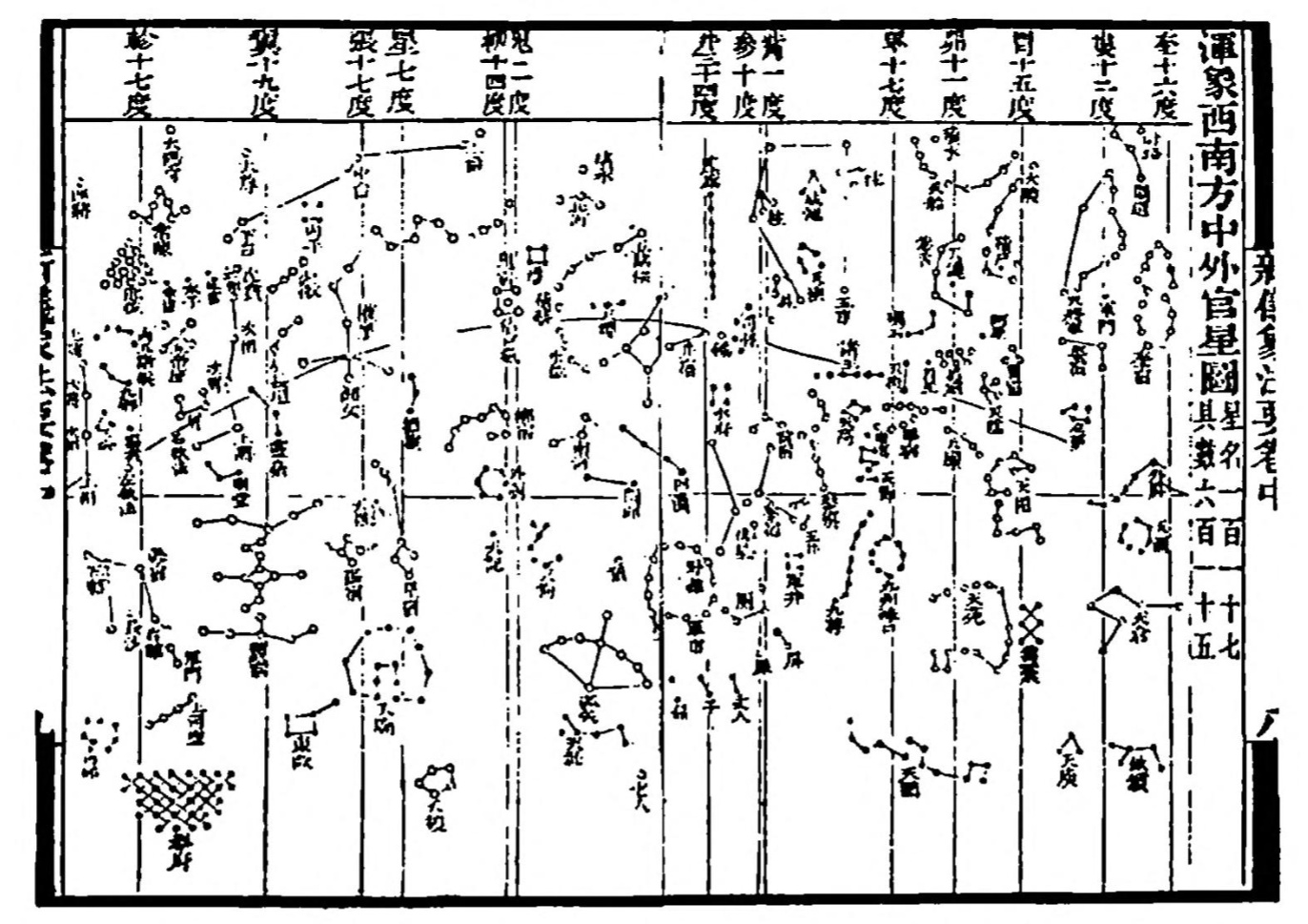
One of the star charts from Su Song's Xin Yi Xiang Fa Yao published in 1092, featuring the cylindrical equirectangular projection and the corrected position of the pole star thanks to Shen Kuo's astronomical observations. Su Song's celestial atlas of five star maps is actually the oldest in printed form.

China was a global scientific and technological leader up until the early years of the Ming dynasty. Ancient and medieval Chinese discoveries and Chinese innovations such as papermaking, printing, the compass, and gunpowder (the Four Great Inventions) contributed to the economic development of ancient and medieval East Asia, the Middle East and Europe. Chinese scientific activity began to neuter and wane around the fourteenth century. Unlike in Europe and other parts of the Western World, Chinese engineers and scientists did not attempt to reduce observations of nature to mathematical laws, nor did they form a scholarly community with criticisms and progressive research. In the Chinese Confucian cultural ethos dating back to the Han dynasty, Confucian philosophers held a strong focus by placing an overemphasis on literature, the arts, and public administration, while scientific and technological pursuits were looked down upon in terms of prestige and respectability and regarded to be unworthy endeavors that were fell far beneath their social pay grade as such domains of inquiry were seen as trivial or restricted to limited practical applications. One contributing factor is believed to be the imperial examination system, which deprived the incentives that encouraged up-and-coming Chinese intellectuals to actively engage in scientific and technological endeavors. The absence of motivating factors rooted in the imperial examinations stifled the development of scientific and technological innovation and resulted in a stagnation of Chinese scientific and technological creativity and development over the last several centuries. By the 17th century, Europe and the Western world surpassed China in scientific and technological advancement. The causes of this early modern Great Divergence continue to be debated by scholars to this day.

After being defeated repeatedly by Japan and Western nations in the 19th century, Chinese reformers began promoting modern science and technology as part of the Self-Strengthening Movement. After the Communist victory in 1949 science and technology research was organized based on the model of the Soviet Union. It was characterized by a bureaucratic organization led by non-scientists, research according to the goals of central plans, separation of research from production, specialized research institutes, concentration on practical applications, and restrictions on information flows. Researchers should work as collectives for society rather than as individuals seeking recognition. Many studied in the Soviet Union which also transferred technology. The Soviet Union provided 10,000 experts to China to facilitate its development.

China began a formal computing development program in 1956 when it launched the Twelve-Year Science Plan and formed the Beijing Institute of Computing Technology under the Chinese Academy of Sciences.

From the 1950s until the end of the Mao era, China emphasized self-reliance in scientific and technological development. This resulted from its relative international isolation and its ideological stance.

Beginning in 1964, China through the Third Front construction built a self-sufficient industrial base in its hinterlands as a strategic reserve in the event of war with the Soviet Union or the United States. The Third Front construction was primarily carried out in secret, with the location for Third Front projects following the principle of "close to the mountains, dispersed, and hidden" (靠山, 分散, 隐蔽; kàoshān, fēnsàn, yǐnbì). From 1964-1974, China invested more than 40% of its industrial capacity in Third Front regions. After Nixon's China trip in 1972, investment to the Third Front region gradually declined. Rapprochement between the United States and China decreased the fear of invasion which motivated the Third Front construction. Through its distribution of infrastructure, industry, and human capital around the country, the Third Front created favorable conditions for subsequent market development and private enterprise.

The Cultural Revolution (1966-1976), which sought to remove perceived bourgeois influences and attitudes, caused large negative effects and disruptions. Construction of the Third Front slowed during its early stages. Among other measures it saw the scientific community and formal education attacked, intellectuals were sent to do manual labor, universities and academic journals were closed, most research ceased, and for nearly a decade China trained no new scientists and engineers.

In 1966, China transitioned from vacuum-tube computers to fully transistorized computers. In the mid-1960s through the late 1960s, China began a semiconductor program and was producing third-generation computers by 1972.

After Mao Zedong's death, S&T was established as one of the Four Modernizations in 1976. The new leader Deng Xiaoping, and architect of the reform and opening up, was a strong promoter of S&T and reversed the policies of the Cultural revolution. The Soviet inspired system was then gradually reformed. Media began promoting the value of S&T, scientific thinking, and scientific achievement. The third and fourth generations of leaders came almost exclusively from technical backgrounds.

In March 1986, China launched the large-scale technology development plan, the 863 Project.

The State Council of the People's Republic of China in 1995 issued the "Decision on Accelerating S&T Development" which described planned Science & Technology development for the coming decades. It described S&T as the chief productive force and affecting economic development, social progress, national strength, and living standards. S&T should become closely associated with market needs. Not only Soviet style institutes should do research but also universities and private industries. State institutions should form joint ventures with Chinese or foreign venture capital in order for S&T developments to reach the industry. S&T personal should become more occupationally mobile, pay should be linked to economic results, and age and seniority should become less important for personal decisions. Intellectual property rights should be respected. Information exchange should improve and there should be competition and open bidding on projects. The environment should be protected. Chinese indigenous S&T in certain key areas should be especially promoted. Public officials should improve their understanding of S&T and incorporate S&T in decision making. Society, including Communist Party youth organizations, labor unions and the mass media, should actively promote respect for knowledge and human talents.

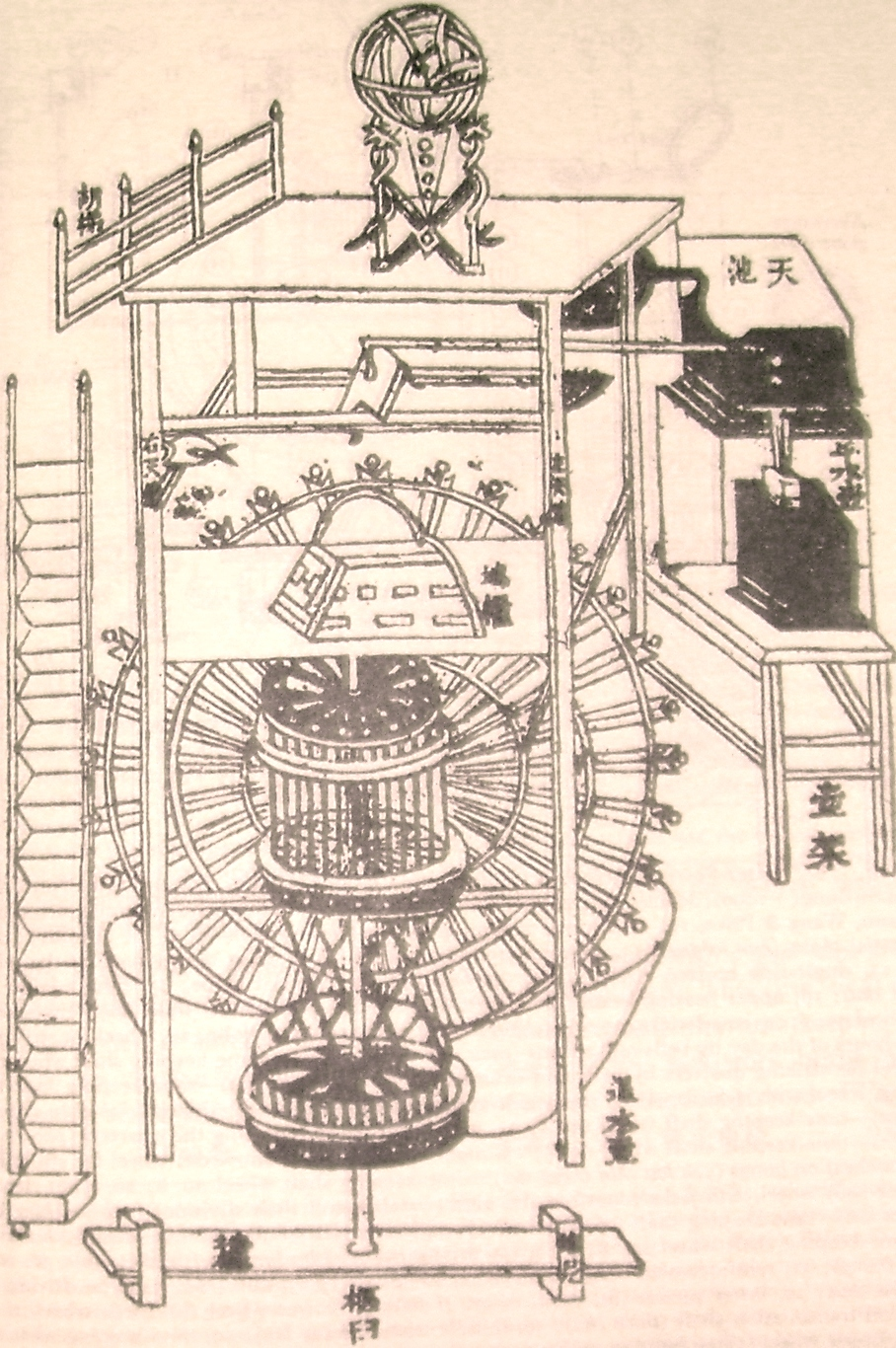
An interior diagram of the astronomical clocktower of Kaifeng featured in Su Song's book, written by 1092 and published in printed form by the year 1094

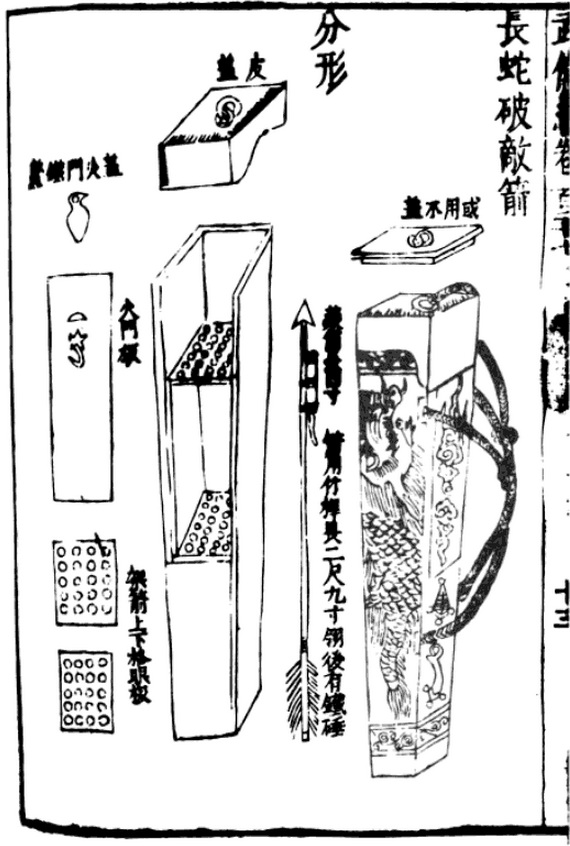
A depiction of the 13th Century "long serpent" rocket launcher. The holes in the frame are designed to keep the rockets separate, from the 1510 edition of Wujing Zongyao.

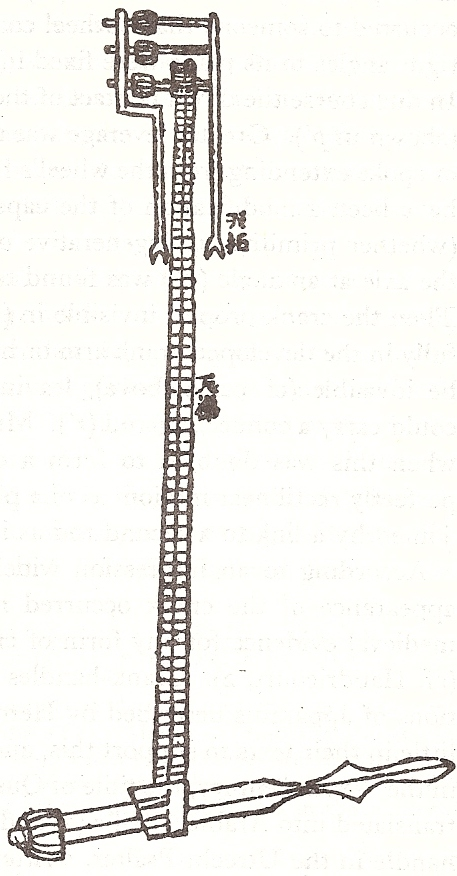
The oldest known illustration of an endless power-transmitting chain drive. It was used for coupling the main driving shaft of his clock tower to the armillary sphere gear box.

Since the 1990s, China has concentrated on building physical infrastructure such as roads and ports. During the 2010s, a policy was implemented requiring technology transfer as a condition for foreign companies wanting entry into the Chinese market. However, China has shifted its growing focus towards prioritizing indigenous innovation to meet its national scientific and technological requirements. During this period China has succeeded in developing an innovation infrastructure, founded on the establishment of over 100 science and technology parks in many parts of the country, along with encouragement of entrepreneurship outside the state-owned sector. Yip and McKern argue that Chinese firms have evolved through three phases as their innovation capabilities have matured and that by 2017 many of them are of world standard. They are now strong competitors in the China market and increasingly in foreign markets, where they are establishing local operations.

== Techno-nationalism ==
While the term "techno-nationalism" was originally applied to the United States in the 1980s, it has since been used to describe nationalistic technology policies in many countries, particularly in Asia. Chinese techno-nationalism is rooted in the country's humiliation at the hands of more advanced countries in the 19th century. Indeed, China's leaders (like those of other countries) have long seen scientific and technological development as vital for achieving economic affluence, national security, and national prestige. Lacking indigenous technological intellectual property and innovation are seen as key national problems. The 21st century has thus seen a series of central government initiatives designed to promote "indigenous innovation" and technological development more generally in China. These include the National Medium- and Long-Term Program for Science and Technology Development (2006–20), the Strategic Emerging Industries initiative, the Internet Plus initiative, and the Made in China 2025 Program, among others.

Through these initiatives, the Chinese state has intervened in the economy in a variety of ways to promote national technological development and reduce reliance on other countries. Prioritized industries and firms are protected and guided. There are systematic efforts to replace foreign technology and intellectual properties with indigenous technology. Foreign companies are given many incentives for technology transfer and for moving R&D to China. At the same time the technological abilities of domestic companies are supported in various ways. Such policies have generated considerable conflict between China and developed countries, particularly the United States, although China has often proven flexible when its policies have been challenged.

Nationalism and nationalistic achievements have been seen as becoming the main ideological justifications and societal glue for the regime as Marxism loses influence. Some science and technology mega-projects have been viewed as questionable trophy projects done for propaganda purposes with Chinese state-controlled media being filled with reports of Chinese achievements. In 2019, reports surfaced stating that the Chinese government has ordered all foreign PC hardware and operating systems that are installed in government offices to be replaced in the next three years. Other reports stated that the Chinese government would be increasing subsidies for tech firms.

== Gross domestic expenditure on research and development ==
In its Medium and Long-Term Plan for the Development of Science and Technology (2006–2020), China fixed itself the target of devoting 2.5% of GDP to research and development by 2020. Between 2003 and 2012, gross domestic expenditure on research and development (GERD) rose from 1.13% to 1.98% of GDP, suggesting that the country was on track to meet its target.

The research firm Battelle estimates that China's GERD will exceed that of the United States by 2023. However, several convergent factors cast doubt over the accuracy of Battelle's prediction: the deceleration in China's rate of economic growth in 2014, the considerable drop in industrial production since 2012 and the major stock market slide in mid-2015. After progressing rapidly for a decade, GERD stabilized at 2.07% of GDP in 2015.

China devoted 5.1% of total research spending to basic research in 2015, according to the UNESCO Institute for Statistics. This is up from 4.8%, on average, over the past decade, but less than in 2004 (6.0%). The prolonged policy focus on experimental development has resulted in enterprises contributing three-quarters of Chinese research spending (77% of total expenditure on R&D in 2015). Enterprises focus on experimental development, which accounted for as much as 97% of their total research expenditure by 2015. Business enterprises contributed 60% of GERD in 2000 and 74% in 2008. In 2004, 74% of GERD went on experimental development. China aims to increase the share of basic research to 15% of total research spending by 2020.

== Institutions ==
The State Council of the People's Republic of China is the top administrative organ in China. Immediately below it are several ministries and ministry level organizations involved with various aspects of science and technology. The State Council Science and Education Leading Group, consisting of the leaders of the major science bodies, attempts to organize the national policy. Efficiency of overall coordination has been questioned with various agencies seen as having overlapping missions and rivalries for resources and sometimes engaging in wasteful duplication.

The Ministry of Science and Technology of the People's Republic of China, formerly the State Science and Technology Commission, is the body primarily responsible for science and technology strategy and policy. It also administers national research programs, S&T development zones, and international cooperation. The Ministry of Education of the People's Republic of China oversees education as well as research institutes at universities. Several other ministries such as the Ministry of Industry and Information Technology of the People's Republic of China, the Ministry of Health of the People's Republic of China, and the Ministry of Agriculture of the People's Republic of China are also involved in S&T.

The National Planning Office of Philosophy and Social Sciences directs planning for social sciences and philosophy.

The Chinese Academy of Sciences (CAS) is the most prestigious professional science organization in China with China's scientific elite being members. It directs many research institutes, research programs, graduate training programs, and gives influential advice. The Chinese Academy of Engineering (CAE) gives important advice but unlike the CAS does not have research institutes of its own. The Chinese Academy of Social Sciences (CASS) has a similar role to CAS for social sciences and philosophy. There are also many more narrow academies such as the Chinese Academy of Fishery Sciences.

The National Natural Science Foundation of China (NSFC) gives grants to individual researchers after peer-review.

The People's Liberation Army General Armaments Department directs military R&D.

The national scientific and academic organizations affiliated to the China Association for Science and Technology are also important forces in scientific and technological research.

The Society of Chinese Scientific Journalism presides over the Society of Chinese Technical Communication, China's first government approved technical communication association. Since 2002, the group has held annual conferences.

Research is carried out by governmental research institutes, in higher learning institutions, and by private enterprises.

Local governments have become increasingly important in R&D funding and may now contribute up to half of government spending. Intense rivalry for research and high tech industry has been argued to sometimes create wasteful subsidized overcapacity, dispersal of efforts better centralized in a few localities, and poorly judged bureaucratic subsidizing of technologies that soon become out-dated.

== National programs ==
As of 2010, China's national R&D programs encompassed the:

- Key Technologies Program (renamed in 2006 as "zhicheng" or Support)
- National High Technology Program (863 Program)
- National Basic Research Program (973 Program)
- Spark Program - Rural technology
- Torch Program - New technology commercialization by creating special hi-tech zones and incubators
- Key Laboratories Program
- Engineering Research Centers
- State Key and New Product Program
- Innovation Fund for Small and Medium-Sized Enterprises
- Special Technology Development Project for Research Institutes
- Action Plan for Promoting Trade by Science and Technology
- National New Products Program
- Agricultural S&T Transfer Fund

The major national programs received 15-20% of government R&D spending in 2010. They funded research, after a stated competitive proposal procedure, in universities, institutes, and enterprise. Important project may receive funding from several programs. The programs have arguably had a strong effect but have also been involved in scandals, corruption and fraud. They have been accused mainly of producing derivative works rather than driving innovation and it has been claimed that they ignore merit in selecting projects in favor of cronyism. China is trying to improve its efficiency through measures such as more peer-review and evaluations.

In 2014, the China Integrated Circuit Industry Investment Fund was established in an effort to reduce dependence on foreign semiconductor companies.

== Economic and Technological Development Zones ==
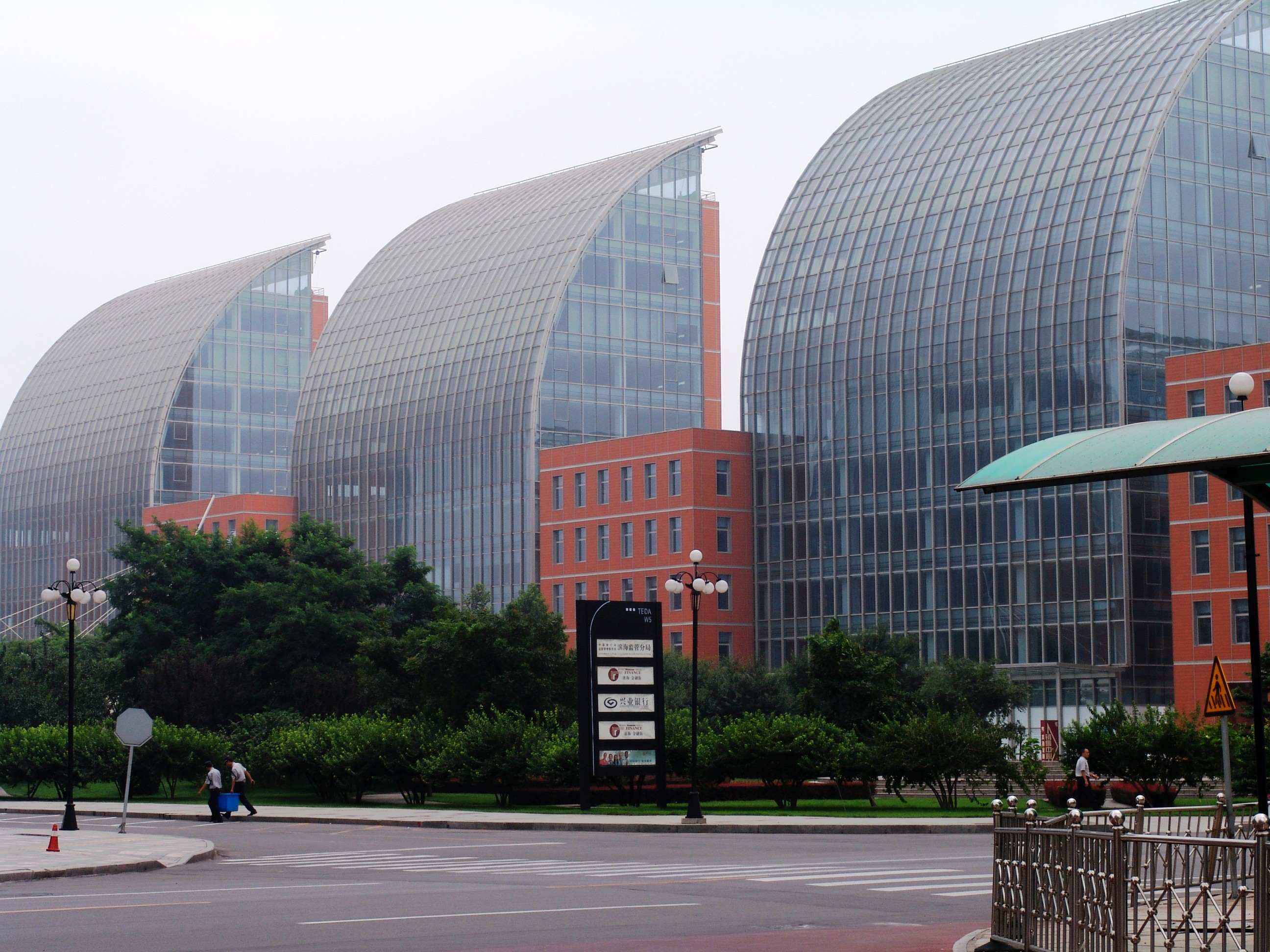
Tianjin Economic-Technological Development Area

Based on the success of the Special Economic Zones of the People's Republic of China, China has created Economic and Technological Development Zones. They have the purposes of building up high tech industries, attracting foreign investment, increasing exports, and improve the regional economy. They are considered to have been very successful and have been expanded from an initial fourteen to fifty-four.

=== Shanghai National Development Zones ===
==== Lin-gang Special Area ====
- The Lin-gang Special Area is set to benchmark against the most competitive free trade zone recognized internationally, and implement open policies and systems with international market competitiveness, to realize the convenience of foreign investment, business operation and capital flow, facilitate the import and export of goods, and offer highly connected transportation network.

==== Shanghai Zhanjiang High-tech ====
- Zhanjiang High-tech Zone focuses on the development of "3+X" industrial system with integrated circuits, biomedicine and artificial intelligence as the core industries. In the future, it aims to strengthen the three major sectors, develop characteristic industries of digital economy, green and low-carbon economy, new energy vehicles, high-end equipment manufacturing, aerospace, information communication, and new materials. It will cultivate cutting-edge industries such as the sixth generation of communication technology, next generation of photonic devices, brain-like intelligence, hydrogen energy, gene and cell technology, and new marine economy.

==== Pilot Free Trade Zone ====
- The Shanghai FTZ has systemic innovation as its core and focuses on fields such as investment, trade, finance, and in-process and post-event supervision. A number of fundamental and core institutional innovation achievements have been made since its inception. About half of the seven batches of innovations in the FTZ system, which have been promoted nationwide by the State Council, were pioneered by the Shanghai FTZ. To date, more than 300 reform experiences have been replicated and promoted nationwide at different levels and in different fields.

==== Shanghai Chemical Industry Park ====
- Shanghai Chemical Industry Park (SCIP) is a state-level economic and technological development zone dominated by petrochemical industry, as well as one of the "Seven Major Petrochemical Industry Bases" planned by the State Council. Located at the north shore of Hangzhou Bay, SCIP has formed circular economic industry chain started with ethylene and established high-end industrial clusters featuring chemical new materials, which has become a specialized chemical industry park with many well-known international chemical enterprises, highly correlated industrial product chains and advanced circular economy.

== Education and R&D personnel ==
PISA 2009 results for the top 10 nations
Rank	Mathematics		Sciences		Reading	
1.	Shanghai, China	600	Shanghai, China	575	Shanghai, China	556
2.	Singapore	562	Finland	554	South Korea	539
3.	Hong Kong, China	555	Hong Kong, China	549	Finland	536
4.	South Korea	546	Singapore	542	Hong Kong, China	533
5.	Taiwan	543	Japan	539	Singapore	526
6.	Finland	541	South Korea	538	Canada	524
7.	Liechtenstein	536	New Zealand	532	New Zealand	521
8.	Switzerland	534	Canada	529	Japan	520
9.	Japan	529	Estonia	528	Australia	515
10.	Canada	527	Australia	527	Netherlands	508

In the first participation of Chinese student in an international student assessment test, the 2009 PISA, 15-year-old students from Shanghai ranked first in all of the three categories: mathematics, science, and reading. The Chinese students scored particularly well compared to other nations in mathematics. One explanation for the Chinese results may be a culture emphasizing education and competitive examinations and more time spent studying in part due to less participation in activities such as sports. Teaching has become a higher status occupation. Also, industrialized Shanghai which has done important educational reforms may not be representative for the rest of China. While there was no evidence of cheating or technical problems with the testing, Shanghai attracts many immigrants from the rest of China may have allowed particularly good students to study in the city. The OECD director of the testing, Andreas Schleicher, said that the results were expected to produce astonishment and had been examined for accuracy by international experts after the OECD received the Shanghai scores. He also said that the results "refute the commonly held hypothesis that China just produces rote learning" and "Large fractions of these students demonstrate their ability to extrapolate from what they know and apply their knowledge very creatively in novel situations". He believes that China has moved away from learning by rote. According to Schleicher, Russia performs well in rote-based assessments, but not in PISA, whereas China does well in both rote-based and broader assessments. In 2018 four major regions (Beijing, Shanghai, Jiangsu and Zhejiang) in China topped the rankings in reading, mathematics and science and China's school children are now the smartest in the world. Chinese high school students won multiple gold medals every year consistently at many International Science Olympiad Competitions like the International Biology Olympiad, the International Olympiad on Astronomy and Astrophysics, the International Olympiad in Informatics, the International Earth Science Olympiad, the International Mathematical Olympiad, the International Physics Olympiad and the International Chemistry Olympiad.

China's rank based on number of Gold Medals in last 10 years(2014-2023):

- Physics - 1-st
- Chemistry -1-st
- Biology - 2-nd
- Mathematics - 1-st

China has become one of the world's biggest sources for research and development personnel. Between 2000 and 2008, the number of engineers and scientists more than doubled to 1.59 million. Relative to population size this is still low compared to major developed nations like the United States and Japan but the gap is rapidly closing. The number of doctorate awards in science and engineering have increased tenfold since the early 1990s. The number of students in general at universities increased from 1 million to 5.4 million during the 1998-2007 period. In 2009 alone, China produced over 10,000 PhD engineering graduates, and as many as 500,000 BSc graduates in engineering, mathematics, information technology, and computer science – more than any other country.

The C9 League, pitched as China's Ivy League, is an alliance of nine elite Chinese universities which receive a high amount of national research funding and produce a large share of national research output.

Chinese universities contribute an unusually large share of patents. The universities receive about half of R&D money from private enterprises.

Eight out of nine members of the Politburo Standing Committee of the Chinese Communist Party (CCP) have engineering degrees, including CCP general secretary Hu Jintao.

2.25 million students have studied abroad since 1978. 340,000 were studying abroad in 2011 which was an increase by 20% over the previous year. In total 818,400 have returned to China with this occurring in particular in recent years. 186,200 returned to China in 2011 which was an increase by 38% over the previous year. China offers several benefits for high-achieving foreign educated Chinese who return to China. Students are now also returning because increased job opportunities unlike previously when many stayed abroad due lack of jobs in China. A 2009 study found that only 10% of Chinese students plan to stay in the United States due to visa restrictions, fear of lack of job opportunities, and belief that US growth will lag behind average world growth rates. 52% believed that the best job opportunities were in China which was in marked contrast with earlier surveys. 74% felt that the best days of China's economy was coming. 68% intended to start businesses. When they return, foreign educated students often provide crucial science and technology knowledge, management skills, and innovation abilities for scientific research and industry. The senior management in high tech companies are often foreign educated.

== Chinese diaspora ==
Overseas Chinese, as is the case for other diasporas and their homelands, have played a substantial role in contributing to China's scientific and technological development. The Chinese diaspora have been seen as a key conduit for channelling and facilitating expertise, investment, trade, and modern technology transfers to the country through their engagement in both commercial activities and public non-profit cooperation. By using 'Brain Gain' to attract highly educated overseas Chinese to return to China to work, China has made significant improvements in its innovation ecosystem although there are some limitations to how sustainable this technique may be.

== Industrial espionage ==
One of the objectives of Chinese intelligence activity abroad is alleged to be industrial espionage as well gaining military technology. Also private companies have been accused of espionage. Intelligence agencies suspect that thousands of Western companies may have been affected by data breaches that can be traced back to China.

== International cooperation ==
The China Internet Information Center stated in a 2005 article that China had inter-governmental cooperative S&T agreements with 96 nations, cooperative S&T programs with 152 nations and regions, and participated in more than 1,000 international S&T cooperative organizations. NGO international exchanges and cooperative activities had increased. The China Association for Science and Technology and related organizations as well as the National Natural Science Foundation of China participated in many cooperative international organizations. Chinese researchers held 281 leading posts on international organizations' expert committees and held 293 executive member-director or higher level positions.

== Technology transfer and R&D by multinational corporations ==
In the early 1980s foreign companies began transferring technology by licensing agreements and sales of equipment. Later in the 1980s many multinational corporations started transferring technology by entering into joint ventures with Chinese companies in order to expand in China. China in the 1990s introduced increasingly sophisticated regulations of foreign investment by which access to the Chinese market was traded for technology transfer. The entry of China into the World Trade Organization in 2001 required this practice stop but critics argue that it continues. Chinese critics have argued such technology transfer may be useful for catching up but does not create new, cutting-edge technologies.

China has increasingly encouraged multinational corporations to create R&D centers in China. Chinese critics have argued that foreign owned R&D mainly benefits foreign companies and removes many talented Chinese researchers from indigenous companies and institutions. Chinese supporters have argued that the foreign R&D serves as a role model and encouragement for indigenous companies and creates skilled communities from which labor and knowledge can easily flow to indigenous companies. In 2010 there were 1,200 such R&D centers and 400 out the Fortune 500 corporations had created such R&D centers. Corporations have argued that this is a necessity in order to adapt products for the local requirements of the Chinese market as well as it being essential for maintaining global competitiveness to make use the many available Chinese engineers and scientists. China is now ranked first when multinational corporations are asked in which nation future R&D centers are most likely to be located.

== Innovation ==
Beginning in the 1990s, innovation became a focus of national policy-making.

A 2005 report found serious shortcomings to China's national innovation system. There were problems with services to help turn S&T work into results and the allocation of national funding to support S&T was far from optimal. Sometimes researchers became short-sighted if they get too close to the market. Another serious problem was that companies facing severe competition looked first to purchase foreign technology rather than investing in developing technology and technology development capacity at home in China. Many of the patent applications came from medium-sized enterprises (70%) since small enterprises invest little in research. China's hierarchical, top-down society where authority is greatly respected and feared has been argued to stifle creative debate.

China in a 2006 report outlined policies for improving innovation. They include 20 large megaprojects in areas such as nanotechnology, high-end generic microchips, aircraft, biotechnology, and new drugs. This is combined with a more bottom-up approach on a Silicon Valley model consisting of small start-ups, venture capital, and cooperation between industry and universities.

It has also been argued that China is the world leader in making small, innovative improvements to existing designs. One example is continual improvements to the design of power supplies making them gradually smaller, less expensive, and more energy efficient. This may not create completely new products or create headlines but may be more important for creating employment.

During the Xi Jinping era, China has increasingly focused on innovation, through the paradigm of "innovation-driven development."

A 2016 NBER paper found that the Chinese economy is becoming increasingly innovative. The study found that rising labor costs in China and "expanded market opportunities in the world economy" were the main drivers behind innovations. The study also found that state-owned firms innovated less than private firms, even though state-owned firms received far greater subsidies.

In 2020, China's spending on research and development climbed 10.3% to a record 2.44 trillion Chinese yuan ($378 billion) according to the nation's National Bureau of Statistics.

A 2023 Australian Strategic Policy Institute study of what it deemed as 44 critical technologies concluded that China leads the world in 37 of them, including 5G internet, electric batteries, and hypersonic missiles.

Per the Global Innovation Index in 2025, China was one of the most competitive in the world, ranking 10th in the world, 3rd in the Asia & Oceania region and 2nd for countries with a large population of over 100 million. Since 2014, China has been the only middle-income economy and the only newly industrialized economy in the top 30. It has increased its ranking considerably since 2013, where it was ranked 35th globally. China ranks No. 1 globally in patents, utility models, trademarks, industrial designs, and creative goods exports. It also has two (Shenzhen-Hong Kong-Guangzhou and Beijing in the #1 and #4 spots, respectively) of the global top 5 science and technology clusters, which is more than any other country.

As of 2024, the Nature Index ranks seven Chinese universities or institutions in the global top ten for volume of research output. The Leiden Ranking rates six in the global top ten.

== Procurement ==
The central Chinese government, a large buyer of high tech products, in 2009 proposed controversial policies demanding that companies selling to it promote Chinese innovation and that the products sold are free of foreign intellectual property. The most controversial parts were later withdrawn but local Chinese governments continue to use procurement to encourage indigenous innovation.

== Intellectual property ==
China's legal framework for intellectual property (IP) protection is developing rapidly as China becomes a source of innovation, but its IP framework is still less developed than most industrialized nations as of 2023. The general trend of its IP system has been to develop towards increasing similarity with the E.U. and U.S. systems.

=== Patents ===
In 2011, China became the nation with the greatest number of filed patent applications. Nevertheless, this reflects in part that the government gives companies incentives for filing patent applications whether the patent ends up granted or does not. The percentage of patents applications in China filed by Chinese companies rose from less than 52% in 2006 to nearly 73% in 2010. World Intellectual Property Organization (WIPO) data show that Chinese companies have also become more important regarding patents overseas; Chinese companies are in places two and four, respectively, regarding the number of patent applications filed by individual companies. China aims to transform the economy from "Made in China" to "Designed in China," and from contract manufacturing to having brand name companies with resulting improved profit margins.

According to the recent data from the World Intellectual Property Indicators, China's patent office received 1.54 million patent applications in 2018, representing nearly half of patent applications worldwide—more than double the U.S. In 2019, China surpassed the U.S. as the top source of international patent applications filed with WIPO. China-based applicants filed for 58,990 patent applications; 57,840 applications were filed by American applicants.

According to the WIPO, the U.S. had 247,609 equivalent patent applications filed abroad in 2021; Japan and China followed with 190,399 and 111,905, respectively. China ranked second after South Korea in the gross domestic product (GDP)-adjusted number of applications, with 8,159 resident patent applications per US$100 billion in GDP. China also had 5,738 applications in this category. When considering patent applications adjusted for population, China held the fourth global position. South Korea led with 3,599 equivalent patent applications per million population, followed by Japan (1,770), Switzerland (1,119), and China (1,010).

== Standards ==
To encourage innovation and avoid foreign intellectual property China has been developing indigenous technical standards. One example is the TD-SCDMA 3G standard. Critics have seen it as costly and delaying 3G introduction while supporters argue that it has increased technical abilities and experience which has increased Chinese competitiveness regarding 4G. Long-Term Evolution Time-Division Duplex is being implemented as China's indigenous 4G standard.

== Academic publishing ==
The Royal Society in a 2011 report on academic publishing stated that in share of English scientific research papers the United States was first followed by China, the UK, Germany, Japan, France, and Canada. The report predicted that China would overtake the United States some time before 2020, possibly as early as 2013. Science-Metrix, a Canadian data-analysis company, predicted that in 2010 China would publish as many natural sciences and engineering peer-reviewed papers as the United States. In 2015 China is predicted to publish as many papers as the US across all fields. In 2030 China is predicted to surpass the US in life and social sciences. In 2017, China overtakes the U.S. with the highest number of scientific publications.

An analysis of ISI Web of Knowledge data found that China had increased its share of the most highly cited science articles from 1.85% in 2001 to 11.3% in 2011. By 2019, China overtakes UK in 'highly cited researchers' table and ranks second after the United States according to Web of Science, who publish the annual list. Chinese research papers in the fields of material science, chemistry and engineering technology were the most cited in the world in the past decade, according to the same report. The share of the United States declined from 64.3% to 50.7% during the same ten-year period.

A 2009 study of Chinese social science studies in the Social Sciences Citation Index found a slow increase until 1999. The 1999-2007 period saw a very rapid increase. However, in 2007 China still only contributed 1.39% of the studies and mainland China only surpassed Hong Kong in 2006. Economics & business had larger share than social, political & communication science and psychology. The low share of social sciences compared to natural sciences may reflect that this is a common pattern in Asian nations, that Chinese social scientists publish in national journals not included in the Index and have less career incitements regarding publishing in international journals, and that state ideology and control is more important for social sciences than natural sciences. In China natural sciences are administered by the Ministry of Science and Technology while social sciences are administered by the National Planning Office of Philosophy and Social Sciences which may hinder inter-disciplinary collaboration. Although the proportion of Social Science Citation Index (SSCI) articles published internationally from Mainland China has been increasing over time during 1999–2018, it only accounted for 14% of the world in 2018 compared to Eastern Europe (around 25 percent) and Western Europe (around 50 percent).

Articles published in China related to basic medial science and clinical research and indexed by PubMed increased on average by 31.2% and 22% each year between 2000 and 2009. Randomized clinical trial were about 1/3 of clinical research articles. However, in 2009 this still represented only 1.5% of worldwide clinical research articles and 1.7% of worldwide randomized clinical trials. Clinical research education for medical students and the involvement and the supporting environment for medical doctors regarding clinical research have shortcomings.

There are 8,000 journals and 4,600 in scientific fields. Almost all Chinese science organizations publish their own journal. The government owns or supports most journals with only a small number being privately owned. The "publish or perish" system has been argued to contribute to many low quality journals and articles that are infrequently cited and also to plagiarism and fraud. The Chinese government has put into place stricter regulations, punished or terminated some journals, and aims increase quality control and peer evaluation of journals as well as to create five to ten large publishing groups. As part of the reforms, in 2012 the China Association for Science and Technology, which oversees 1,050 journals, in a declaration listed various forms of misconduct, plagiarism, and fraud and as well, the penalties for perpetrating them such as written warnings, blacklisting, contacting the researcher's home institution or funding agencies, or public disclosure. It has also been seen as important by increasing pressure on other journals and by informing editors who may not know that some actions such as favoring researchers based on personal relations are unacceptable. China also plans to give substantial financial incentives to top journals based on factors such as their Chinese and international impact factor. It has been questioned if this will have an effect on the many poor quality journals who in return for money help researchers fill their institutional requirements for published papers. It has been suggested that intense and high profile scrutiny of publication misconduct in China is unsympathetic to the unrealistic pressures Chinese institutes place on their employees to publish, that this scrutiny is disproportionate to scrutiny of similar practices elsewhere in the world, and that this may reflect nationalist and racist biases.

In 2022, China passed both the US and the European Union in the number of high-impact research papers published.

== State-owned enterprises ==
Chinese state-owned enterprises are owned by a variety of actors such as local governments and governmental agencies. They may benefit from advantages not available for smaller, more innovative firms which have been seen as problematic. In 2010 state owned enterprises won many biddings for renewable energy projects since they did not have worry about paying off investments for several decades and could ignore risks and costs. The owners may attempt to protect their enterprises from competition by regulations or otherwise use their influence in an unfair manner which may stifle more innovative, private competitors. Private enterprises surpassed stated owned enterprises during the 2002-2007 period regarding rapidity of increase of research spending, patent applications, and R&D laboratories. The number of research scientists and engineers increased rapidly in private enterprises while they declined in state owned enterprises.

== Corruption ==
Concerned about corruption in Chinese science, some Chinese scientists, including Professor Liu Ming (刘明) of Zhejiang University in his 2005 book Critique of the Academic Evaluation System (学术评价制度批判), argue that interference from government officials and university bureaucrats makes peer review far less effective in China than it could be. The time scientists spend cultivating politically influential people is lost to scientific research. Liu argues that the command economy mentality of measuring everything by the numbers combined with pervasive political interference results in a great waste of money, human talent as well as considerable corruption in Chinese science. A 2008 investigation into a certification for high tech enterprises allowing large tax breaks and other advantages found that more than 70% of the enterprises had gained this under questionable circumstances and an investigation of a sample found that 73% did not pass the requirements.

== Awards ==
The State Science and Technology Prizes, including the State Preeminent Science and Technology Award, are the highest honor in People's Republic of China in science and technology, in order to recognize citizens and organizations who have made remarkable contributions to scientific and technological progress, and to promote the development of science and technology.

== Specific areas of R&D ==
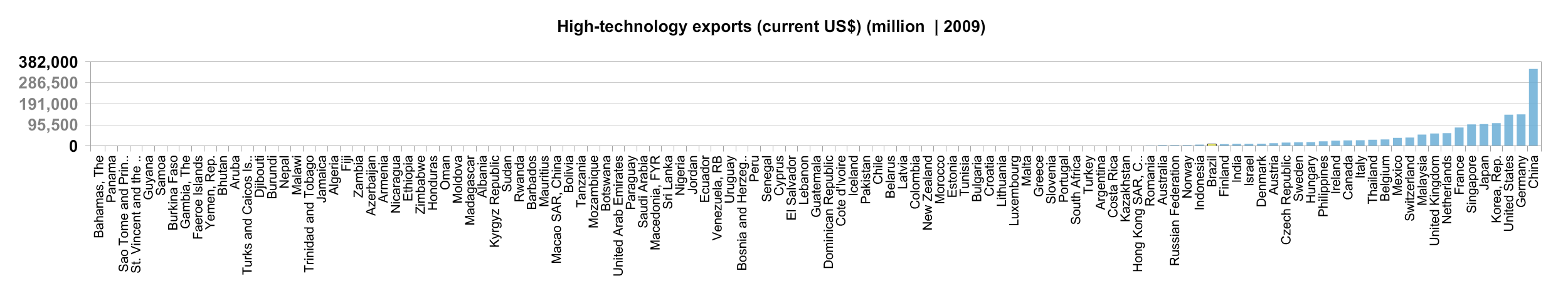
Value in dollars of high tech exports by country in 2009. The value of Chinese high tech exports was more than twice that of any other nation.

In 2024, China's R&D expenditure amounted to 2.69% of GDP, compared with 2.13% in the European Union and 3.44% in the United States. Its R&D workforce comprises more than five million researchers. The Chinese government has identified self-reliance in science and technology as a national security priority and incorporated it into its broader goal of national rejuvenation, often referred to as the "Chinese Dream".

Chinese researchers publish more quantum-related research papers annually than those in any other country. Similarly, Chinese artificial intelligence (AI) companies file more patents than companies in other countries. In 2021, China's intellectual property office received approximately 1.59 million patent applications, making it the world's largest patent-filing jurisdiction. China's "whole-of-nation" approach to innovation emphasizes the coordination and mobilization of resources across different sectors. According to international innovation assessments, China produces more highly cited research papers than the United States in several fields and leads in 37 of 44 critical technology areas, including advanced materials and renewable energy.

The 13th Five-Year Plan for the National Economy and Social Development (2016–2020) will initiate the key Scientific and Technological Innovation 2030 Project in the following key areas: aero-engines and gas turbines; a deep sea station; quantum communication and quantum computers; brain sciences and brain research. The project also encompasses nine other sub-projects, including an innovative seed industry, smart grid, space-terrestrial information network, intelligent manufacturing and robots.

=== Agriculture ===
There is a lack of arable land and water which means only new technology can increase the output of Chinese agriculture. Chinese Communist Party former general secretary Jiang Zemin has therefore called for a "new revolution in agricultural science and technology." Restrictions and regulations concerning genetically modified foods have been introduced or proposed after widespread public concern. China has been buying millions of foreign breeder animals as well as large amount of foreign semen and livestock embryos in order to rapidly improve the genetics of Chinese livestock. More advanced agricultural methods such as increasing use of pesticides has contributed to concerns regarding the Food safety in China. China also hosts significant international research in agroforestry and ecological agriculture.

=== Aquaculture and fishing ===
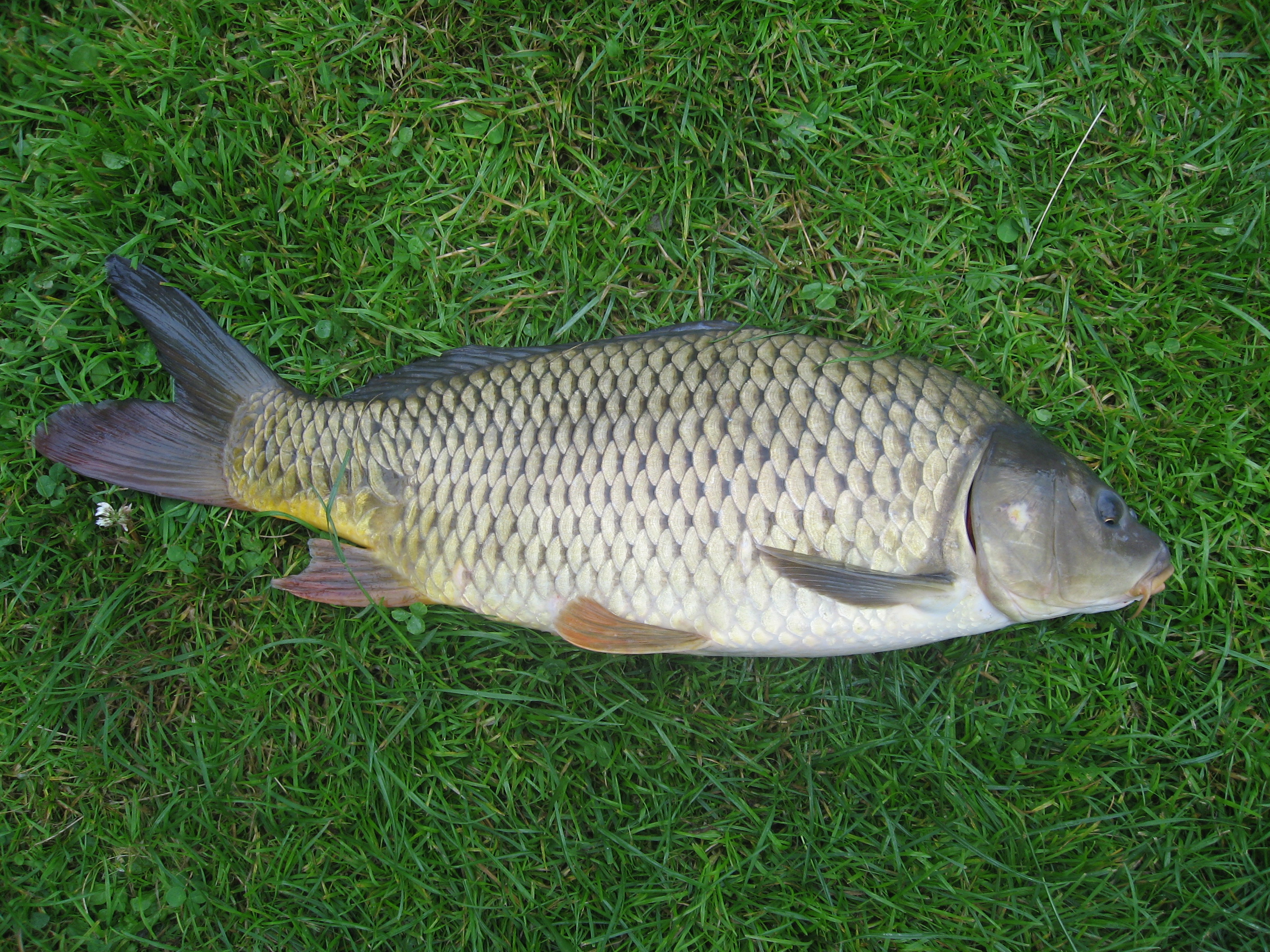
The common carp (Cyprinus carpio)

In 2008 the fishing industry in China accounted for 34% of the global output. Aquaculture in China had more than twice the output of capture fishing and contributed 62.3% of the global aquaculture output. The rapid growth of aquaculture is in part due to Chinese research such as regarding the artificial breeding of carps.

=== Chemistry, materials science and nanotechnology ===
A 2012 study found that China's share of academic papers in the field of nanotechnology had increased from less than 10% in 2000 to nearly a quarter in 2009 and had overtaken the United States for first position. However, China was less influential in the top three journals and regarding citations, suggesting a lesser quality. In terms of the density of publication, however, the United States remained ahead, with 68.76 articles on nanotechnology per million inhabitants, compared to 25.44 per million for China in 2014. China was in second place for the number of patents granted. A number of bodies have been created to establish national standards and ensure oversight.

According to the Institute of Scientific and Technical Information of China, which is affiliated with the Ministry of Science and Technology, China contributed about one-quarter of all academic articles published around the world in materials science and chemistry and 17% of those published in physics between 2004 and 2014 but just 8.7% of those in molecular biology and genetics. This nevertheless represents a steep rise from just 1.4% of the world share of publications in molecular biology and genetics over 1999–2003.

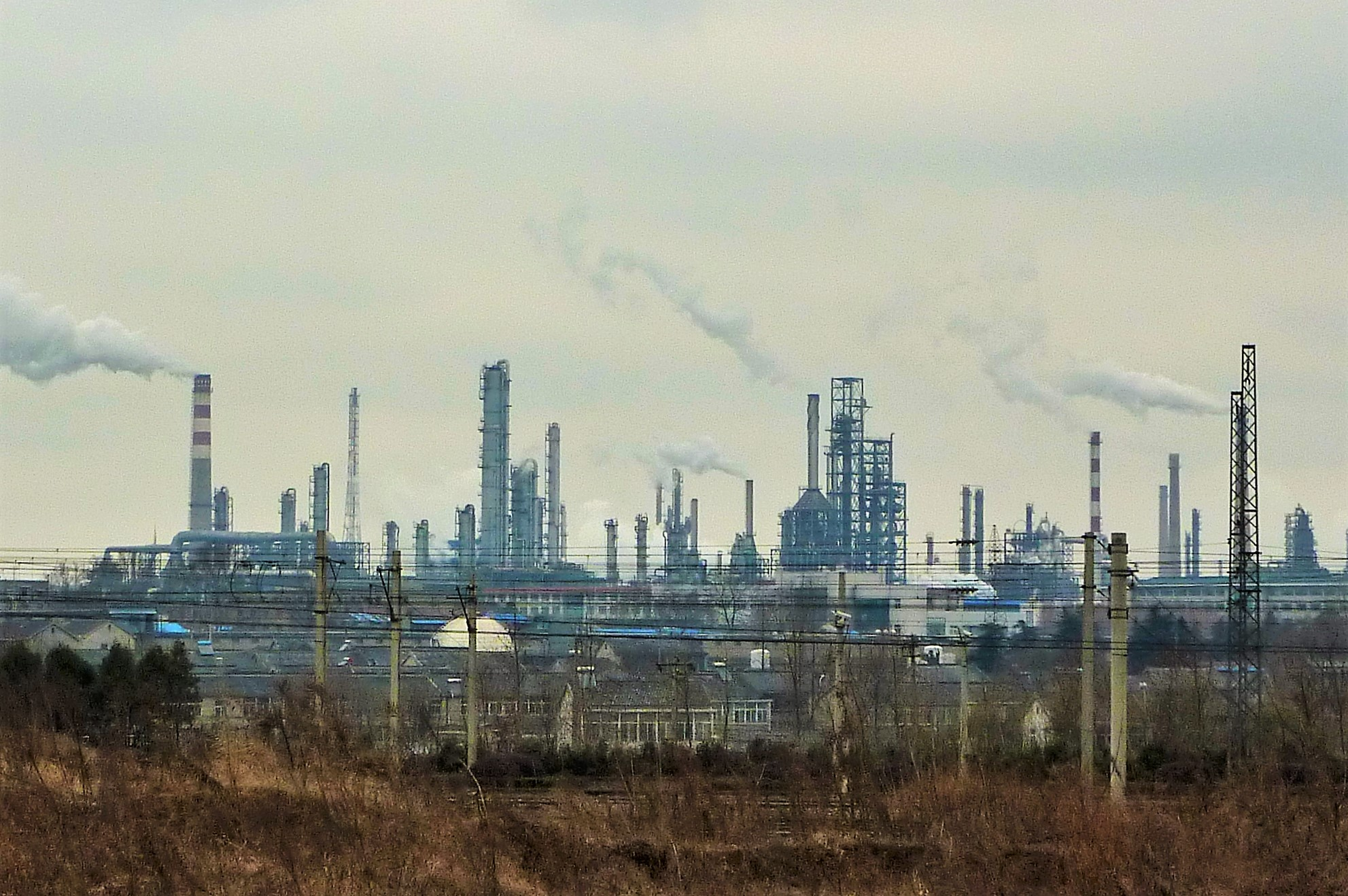
Jinling oil refinery in Nanjing

KPMG in 2010 predicted that the Chinese chemical industry will become world's largest producer by 2015. The Chinese government aims to make China self-sufficient regarding petrochemicals and plastics with the exception of the raw feedstock of oil and gas. The Chinese industry is increasing R&D in order to create higher value products using more advanced technology.

=== Deep sea exploration ===
China is developing its deep sea exploration capabilities, such as by the Jiaolong submersible, with an eye to future applications such as deep sea mining.

=== Tourism ===
China's National Immigration Administration issued approximately 20.9 million ordinary passports in 2025. China's tourism industry has made substantial progress since the country's reform and opening-up. Technologies improve the consumer experience, increase the amount of data collected by connected devices, broaden the reach of analytics, and create opportunities to deliver personalized customer experiences and develop new products and services. The application of technology and networking in China's tourism industry has developed significantly since 1997. During the 2003 SARS outbreak, network technology demonstrated advantages in terms of speed, convenience, and the ability to reduce direct human contact. According to a 2005 study, applications of network technology in China's tourism industry include booking flights, hotels, and visits to scenic spots. The development of these technologies, alongside their application during epidemics such as SARS, was considered an opportunity for further development of China's tourism industry.

Current technologies include mobile devices, digital platforms, big data, open data, the Internet of Things (IoT), three-dimensional printing, socially interactive robots, artificial intelligence, virtual reality, augmented reality, blockchain, near-field communication (NFC), and QR codes. These technologies are transforming the tourism industry, creating new opportunities and challenges.

=== Electronics and information technology ===
In 2009 China manufactured 48.3% of the world's televisions, 49.9% of mobile phones, 60.9% of personal computers and 75% of LCD monitors. Indigenously made electronic components have become an important source of recent growth.

==== Artificial intelligence ====
On 8 July 2017, the Chinese State Council announced plans to turn China into the world leader in artificial intelligence (AI) by 2030, seeking to make the industry worth 1 trillion yuan. The State Council published a three-step road map to that effect in which it outlined how it expects AI to be developed and deployed across a wide number of industries and sectors, such as in areas from the military to city planning. According to the road map, China plans to catch up to current AI world leaders' technological abilities by 2020, make major breakthroughs by 2025 and be the world leader in 2030.

==== Drones and robotics ====
China is the leader in drone technology, it is the first country in the world to create large scale transport drones, as well as the first to produce an amphibious drone. Chinese drone companies such as DJI and Ehang (Beijing Yi-Hang Creation Science & Technology) conquered majority of the civilian drone industry, with DJI alone dominating 85% of the global market share. Ehang also created the world's first flying taxi drone, Ehang 184, an eco-friendly low altitude autonomous aerial vehicle capable of providing transportation and medium distance communication.

In some regions, such as the Pearl River Delta, manufacturers have problems with labor shortages, raising wages, and higher expectations regarding work from more highly educated young people. This has increased the demand for industrial robots. As of 2017, China is the largest user and producer of robotics technology, as well as the first country in the world to perform an automated dental implant. It is the largest and fastest-growing robotics market in the world, and plans to manufacture at least 100,000 industrial robots annually by 2020. An example of the application of robotics in logistics is Cainiao, which has deployed automated guided vehicles (AGVs) in its warehouses to facilitate parcel handling and sorting. In 2017, Cainiao opened an automated warehouse in Huiyang, Guangdong, equipped with approximately 200 AGV robots capable of transporting goods to warehouse workers for sorting. The facility was designed to process more than one million shipments per day.

==== Software industry ====
The Chinese software industry in 2010 had a higher than 15% share of the world's software and information service market and had been growing by an average 36% each year during the previous decade. Chinese IT companies have been moving away from narrow downstream services and products to having a full range. China, with the active support of the Chinese government, is a leading pioneer in Internet of Things technology.

According to the China Internet Network Information Center there were 751 million internet users as of 2017, with 53.2% of the population being internet users. The number of mobile internet users reached 724 million, with high penetration rates for mobile phones and broadband internet. By 2017, China has the largest e-commerce market in the world, worth US$1.132 trillion, with a significant lead on other markets and almost tripling US market, the second largest.

In 2017, there were more than 1.36 billion mobile subscribers in China, with the number of fixed line subscriptions hitting 310 million. The number of 4G users increased significantly, hitting 932 million by August 2017. By 2020, China plans to adopt 5G network nationwide. State-owned China Telecom has already deployed 5G-oriented C-RAN fronthaul network, unveiling that it will be conducting commercial trials of 5G technology in 2019 and carry out network field trials in six Chinese cities in the latest sign of China's determination to lead the global deployment of the next-generation mobile technology.

==== Microprocessors ====
China has its own versions of microprocessors, manufactured and developed domestically, which are also used to build the world's most powerful supercomputers.

processor architecture	Processor name	Manufacturer	supported OS	Supercomputer
RISC64	SW26010	ShenWei	RaiseOS (Linux)	Sunway TaihuLight
MIPS64	Loongson, Godson	ICT & CAS	Android, Linux, BSD	Dawning 6000
Power8, Power9 (IBM)	PowerCore CP1, CP2	Suzhou PowerCore	Suse Linux	
SPARC64	FeiTeng3rd gen, Galaxy FT-1500	YinHeFeiTeng	Kylin Linux	Tianhe-2
IA64 (Itanium)	FeiTeng 1st gen	YinHeFeiTeng		
ARM64	Phytium Mars, Xiaomi	Phytium Technology	Kylin Linux	
x86-64 (VIA)	KX-7000, KH-40000	Zhaoxin	Unity Operating System	
ARM64	Kungpeng	HiSilicon	EulerOS/Unity Operating System	
ARM64	Kirin 900	HiSilicon	Android/Harmony OS	
x86-64 (AMD Zen)		THATIC		

==== Supercomputing ====
Supercomputing in China has expanded rapidly. Supercomputing affects the possibility to do cutting-edge research in many areas such as design of pharmaceuticals, cryptanalysis, natural resource exploration, climate models, and military technology. As of 2017, China had 202 of the 500 most powerful supercomputers in the world, far exceeding any other country (including the US which has 143), in addition to possessing the top 2 most powerful supercomputers. China is developing the capacity to manufacture the components domestically and plans to be the first to build an exascale supercomputer. China may also be planning to create much more powerful large-scale distributed supercomputing by connecting its supercomputer centers together. Tianhe-1 was for a period in 2010-2011 the world's fastest supercomputer. In June 2013, Tianhe-2, the successor to Tianhe-1, took the crown from its predecessor. In 2016, China's new supercomputer, Sunway TaihuLight became the world's most powerful supercomputer, significantly surpassing Tianhe-2's capabilities by three folds, while using Chinese-made chips. This signals China's success not only in the supercomputing industry, but also its domestic chip-making technology.

==== Semiconductors ====
China's semiconductor industry has, despite extensive governmental support, had many problems, such as innovative new designs. This may be due to factors such as poorly guided state and local government support for soon outdated technologies and geographically scattered efforts, lacking engineering education, and poor protection of intellectual property. However various trends may change this, such a new emphasis on market mechanisms rather than direct support, concentration of efforts, the return of Chinese who have studied abroad, increased pressure on foreign companies to transfer technology, indigenous Chinese technological standards, and increased demands for indigenous technology in the local market.

The country has rapidly progressed in the semiconductor industry, while backing its largest chip maker and developer, Tsinghua Unigroup, with a US$150 billion funding to secure China's dominance in the semiconductor technology, and build a world-class semiconductor industry over the next 5 years. However, as of 2020 China has yet to achieve dominance.

=== Entertainment-related technologies ===
The Chinese animation industry and access to the latest technology, such as 3D computer-generated imagery technology, is actively supported by the Chinese government and included in the latest national planning. In part, this may be because of a desire to increase Chinese soft power. The same technology as in Hollywood is available and much postproduction is outsourced to China. Successful indigenous artistic creativity is seen as a problem and may be restricted by factors such as production being aimed at getting government patronage rather than public approval, censorship, and some storylines based on Chinese culture not appealing to foreign audiences. DreamWorks Animation, in a joint venture with Chinese companies, will set up a studio in Shanghai that may eventually get bigger than DreamWorks HQ, in part to avoid to quota restrictions on foreign films with China within a decade having been predicted to become the world's biggest cinema and entertainment market. Disney has also entered into a partnership in order to help develop the Chinese animation industry.

The China Research Institute of Film Science & Technology and the China Film Group Corporation developed and in 2012 put into commercial use the DMAX motion picture film format as well as associated technologies. It has been described as a competitor to IMAX and as laying the foundation for Chinese film projection technology using indigenous Chinese technology and intellectual property.

=== Environment-friendly technologies ===
Rapid industrialization has been accompanied by many environmental problems and rising pollution in China. One part of the Chinese response involves advanced technology such as the world's largest high-speed rail network and high fuel efficiency requirements for vehicles. China is rapidly expanding its wastewater treatment systems and power plant emission reduction systems. Due to the Chinese water crisis, as well as for future exports, China is building up its desalination technological abilities and plans to create an indigenous industry. Some cities have introduced extensive water conservation and recycling programs and technologies.

=== Health sciences ===
==== Biotechnology and genetics ====
Monitor Group in a 2010 report predicted that China within a decade will become the world leader in discovery and innovation in life sciences. Some research is seen as less controversial in China than elsewhere such as research regarding the genetic causes of intelligence. BGI, formerly Beijing Genomics Institute, has been described as having the world's largest DNA sequencing facilities.

Stem cell research and stem cell treatments are less controversial in Chinese culture which have supported Chinese research as well medical tourism to China in order to receive experimental and often unproven therapies. In 2012 a regulatory crackdown was instituted which may increase the ability of the Chinese industry to get approval for sales of future therapies to other nations. More generally, China aims and has made progress towards becoming a world leader in regenerative medicine which also includes areas such as tissue engineering and gene therapy.

China in 2011 stated that biotechnology (including biopharmacy, biological engineering, bio-agriculture and biomanufacturing) was a major priority for science and technology spending. Biotechnology will be used to enhance economic development as well as for improving Chinese environmental protection, nutrition, healthcare, and medicine. The Chinese governments expects biotechnology to add 1 million jobs during the 2011-2015 period.

==== Neuroscientific research ====
On 22 March 2018, an agreement was signed establishing the Chinese Institute for Brain Science, Beijing. The launch of this institute may represent a significant departure from the current policy focus on applied research and development.

Once completed, the new brain institute will serve as a core facility for the country's planned project to study the human brain. The institute will not be part of the Chinese Academy of Sciences. Rather, it will collaborate with the academy, along with Beijing's other leading biomedical institutions, including Tsinghua University, Peking University and the Academy of Military Medical Sciences.

The new institute will probably receive funding both from the National Natural Science Foundation and from the megascience programs within the Scientific and Technological Innovation 2030 Project. In March 2018, the government announced plans to place the National Natural Science Foundation under the Ministry of Science and Technology but the implications of this latest reorganization of science are unclear, as the two agencies have different missions in support of basic research.

==== Pharmaceuticals and medical technology ====
The malaria drug artemisinin was developed by Chinese scientists from traditional Chinese herbology which is part of traditional Chinese medicine.

Merrill Lynch predicted in 2011 that China would become the world's second largest pharmaceutical market in 2013 and the largest in 2020. The chief executive of Hoffmann-La Roche in 2012 stated a few years ago many Chinese life sciences scientists had to leave China but that many were now returning to conditions often better than in the West regarding laboratories, funding, and political support for the industry. Counterfeit drugs have caused a number of scandals as well as being a problem for drug development and authorities have increased regulations and enforcement.

A 2011 report by PwC stated that a decade earlier China barely had any presence in the medical technology industry but its abilities had been rapidly growing. China could well become more important than Europe by 2020.

=== Industrial manufacturing ===
Development of advanced machine tools, such as computer numerical control machine tools, are seen as a priority and supported by the Chinese government. China is the world's leading producer and consumer of machine tools. A 2010 US government report stated that US export controls of advanced five-axis machine tools were ineffectual due to the technical capabilities of Chinese and Taiwanese manufacturers.

=== Military technology ===
One example of new Chinese military technology is the DF-21D anti-ship ballistic missile which reportedly has contributed to a quick and major change in US naval strategy. China is developing anti-satellite weapons and plans to make the navigational Beidou system global by 2020. Other new technologies include Chinese anti ballistic missile developments, the Chengdu J-20 fifth-generation jet fighter, and possibly electromagnetic pulse weapons. Chinese reconnaissance satellites are, according to a 2011 report, almost equal to those of the United States in some areas in which China had almost no capability a decade earlier. Despite increased defense spending, China's share of the world's import of arms is rapidly falling, in part reflecting the increased abilities of the indigenous military production. China is also developing power projection military capabilities such as through the Chinese aircraft carrier program and the Type 071 amphibious transport dock.

15-28% of governmental R&D expenditures may go to military research according to some unofficial estimates. The Chinese defense sector remains almost completely state-owned but military equipment production has been reorganized into corporate bodies allowing limited competition and the defense patent system has been reformed to allow greater rewards to innovative enterprises and individuals. The organizational structure has shed civilian applications while at the same time cooperation with the civilian sector has increased and state supported civilian research sometimes have dual use applications. Chinese jet engines remains a problematic area that has caused concern at the highest levels with China still being largely dependent on imports from foreign manufacturers. One possible explanation is a continued Soviet style fragmentation of the research and production line into many isolated units having little contact with one another causing problems with overall standardization, integration, and quality control. More problems from this may be duplication of efforts, dispersal of efforts, and unproductive competition over patronage causing problems such as dishonest reporting of problems. High precision jet engines may be particularly sensitive to accumulated quality problems.

==== History of China's hydrogen bomb ====
China became a nuclear power in the 1960s. China successfully tested a hydrogen bomb on June 17, 1967, at Lop Nur Nuclear Weapon Test Base, in Malan, Xinjiang (also known as "Test No. 6"). China became the fourth country to have successfully developed a thermonuclear weapon after the United States, Soviet Union and the United Kingdom. The device was dropped from a Hong-6 (Chinese manufactured Tu-16) and was parachute-retarded for an airburst at 2960 meters. The bomb was a three-stage device with a boosted U-235 primary and U-238 pusher. The yield was 3.3 megatons.

It was a fully functional, full-scale, three-stage hydrogen bomb, tested 32 months after China had made its first fission device. China thus produced the shortest fission-to-fusion development known in history. China had received extensive technical help from the Soviet Union to jump-start their nuclear program, but by 1960, the rift between the Soviet Union and China had become so great that the Soviet Union ceased all assistance to China.^{[1]} Thus, the Number 6 test was indeed an independent endeavor, after the induced military and economic sanctions enacted by the superpowers at the time, the United States and the Soviet Union.

China's H-bomb was different from the traditional Teller-Ulam configuration. As an advantage, it was completed without the calculations needed from supercomputers, which would consume a lot of time. To shrink the size of the weapon, the reflectors were made parabolic with the solid fusion fuel located at the foci. It is also known as Yu Min Design (or Yu-Deng Design) as Yu Min made major contributions including the solutions to a series of fundamental and critical theoretical problems of nuclear weapons, which led to breakthrough of the unique hydrogen bomb.

The goal of China was to produce a thermonuclear device of at least a megaton in yield that could be dropped by an aircraft or carried by a ballistic missile. Several explosions to test thermonuclear weapon designs, characteristics and yield boosting preceded the thermonuclear test.^{[1]}

=== Mining and rare earth industry ===
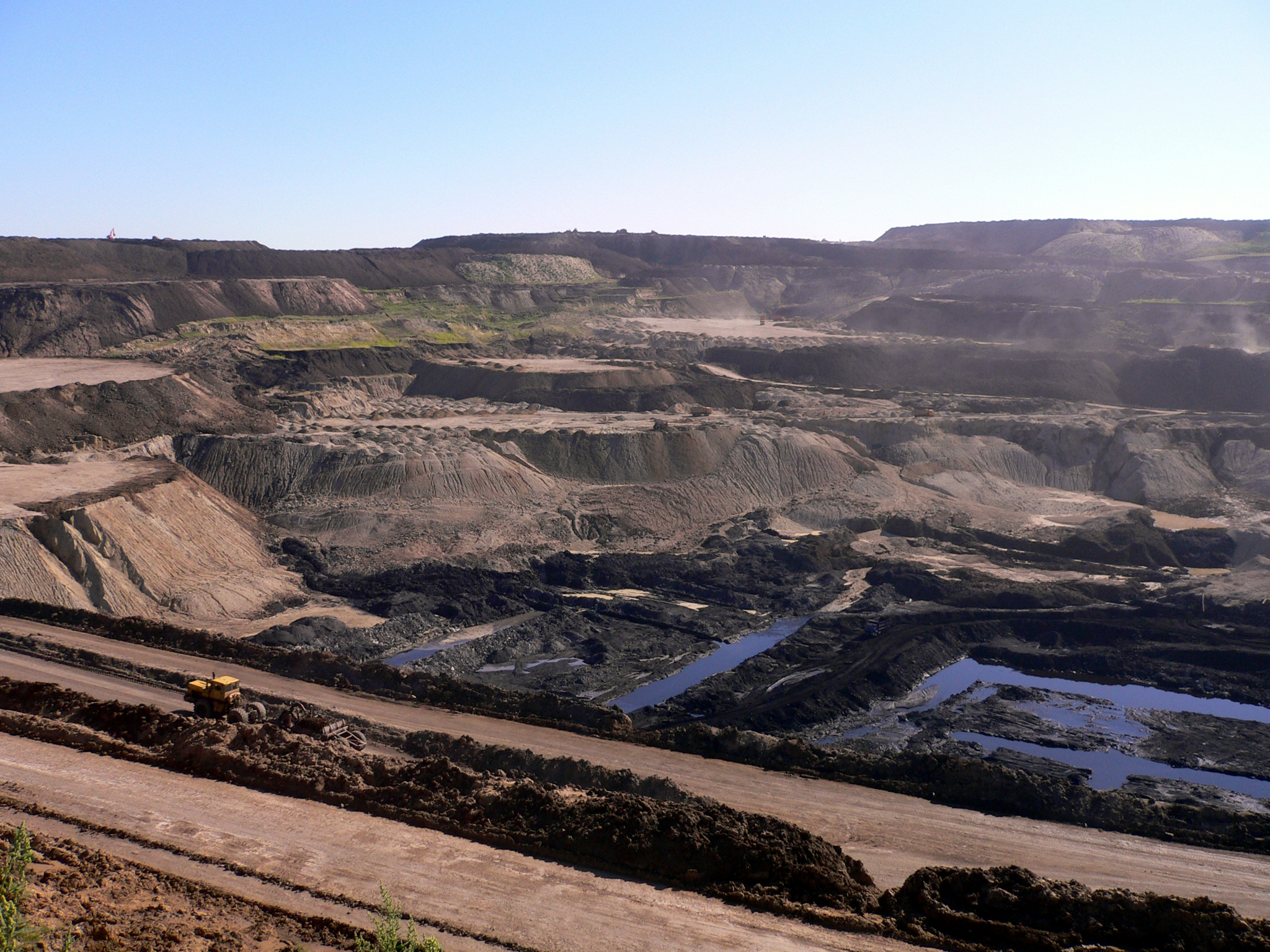
Coal mining in Inner Mongolia

Advisory firm The Beijing Axis director Lilian Luca in 2010 stated that China was becoming a world leader in mining technology. Technological solutions were initially concentrated on achieving massive low-cost production but increasing emphasis has been placed on environmental and safety issues in part reflecting greater concern in China with environmental issues. China was already a world leader in certain areas such as rare earth elements. China has imposed export quotas on rare earth elements, 95% of which are mined in China, citing environmental issues, but has been accused of wanting to force high tech industry using rare earth elements to move to China.

Finding rare earth elements is only the first and some argue the easiest step. Other steps towards manufacturing such as refining is controlled by China and Japan with the previously dominant United States having lost all of its producers and much of its fundamental technological ability with the number of scientists and engineers in the area declining dramatically.

=== Polar research ===
The Chinese Arctic and Antarctic Administration (CAA) organizes China's scientific program for both the Arctic and Antarctic. Polar research by China, in particular in Antarctica, has been growing rapidly. China now has three Antarctic research stations and one in the Arctic on the Norwegian island of Svalbard.

=== Space science ===
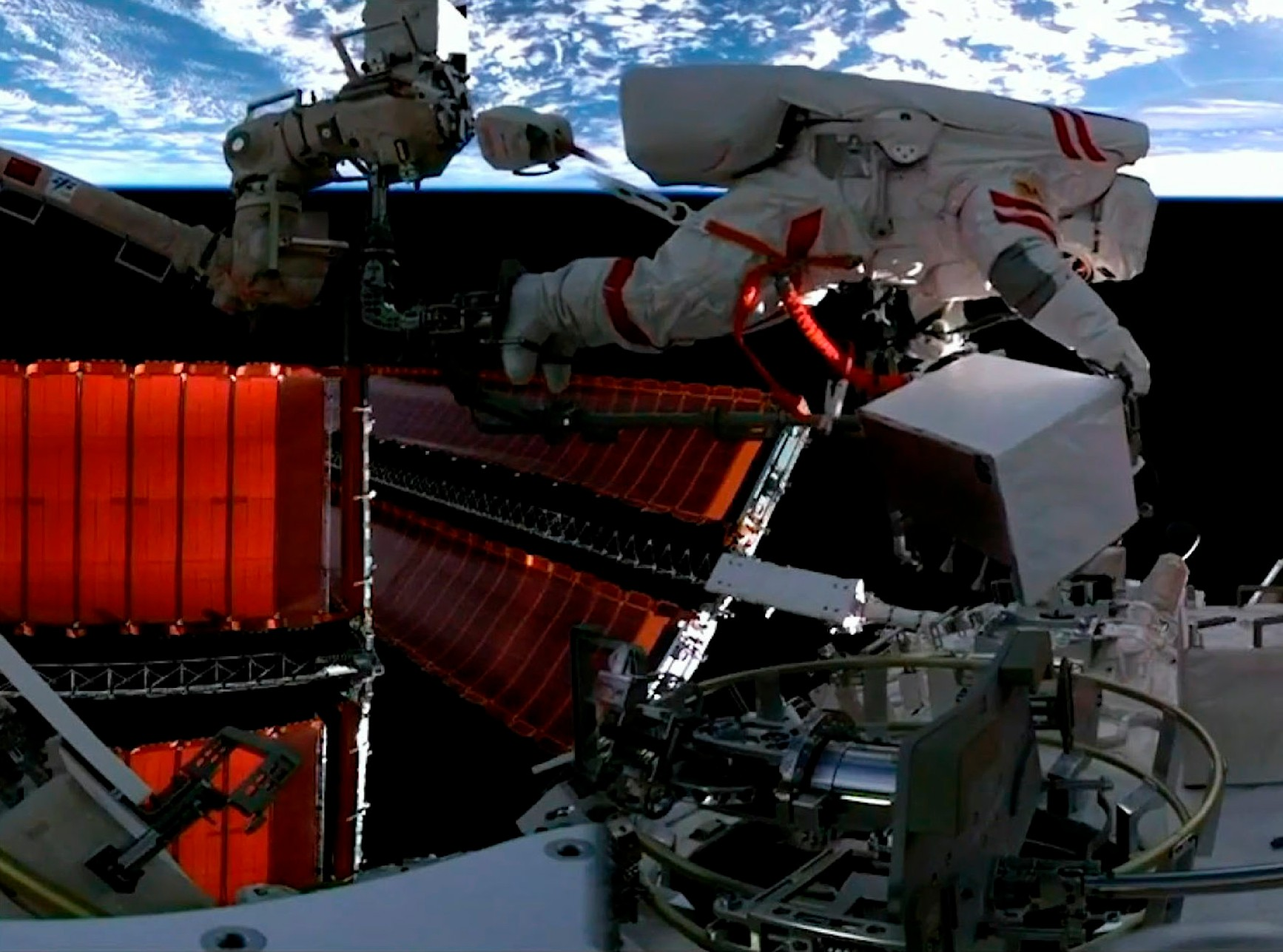
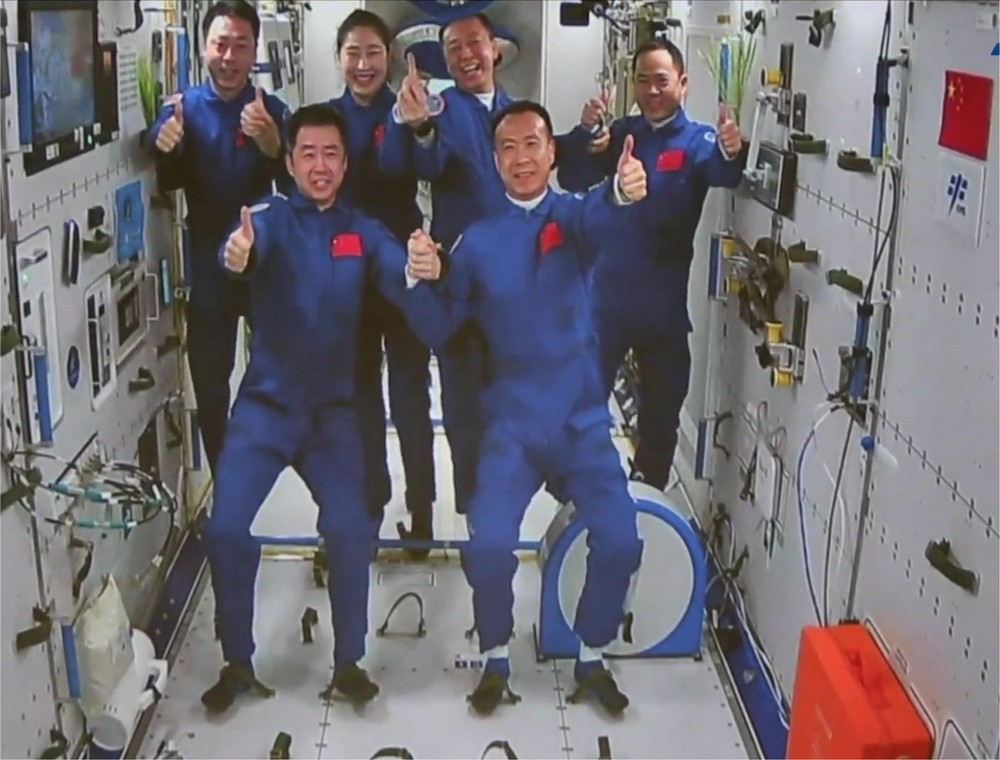
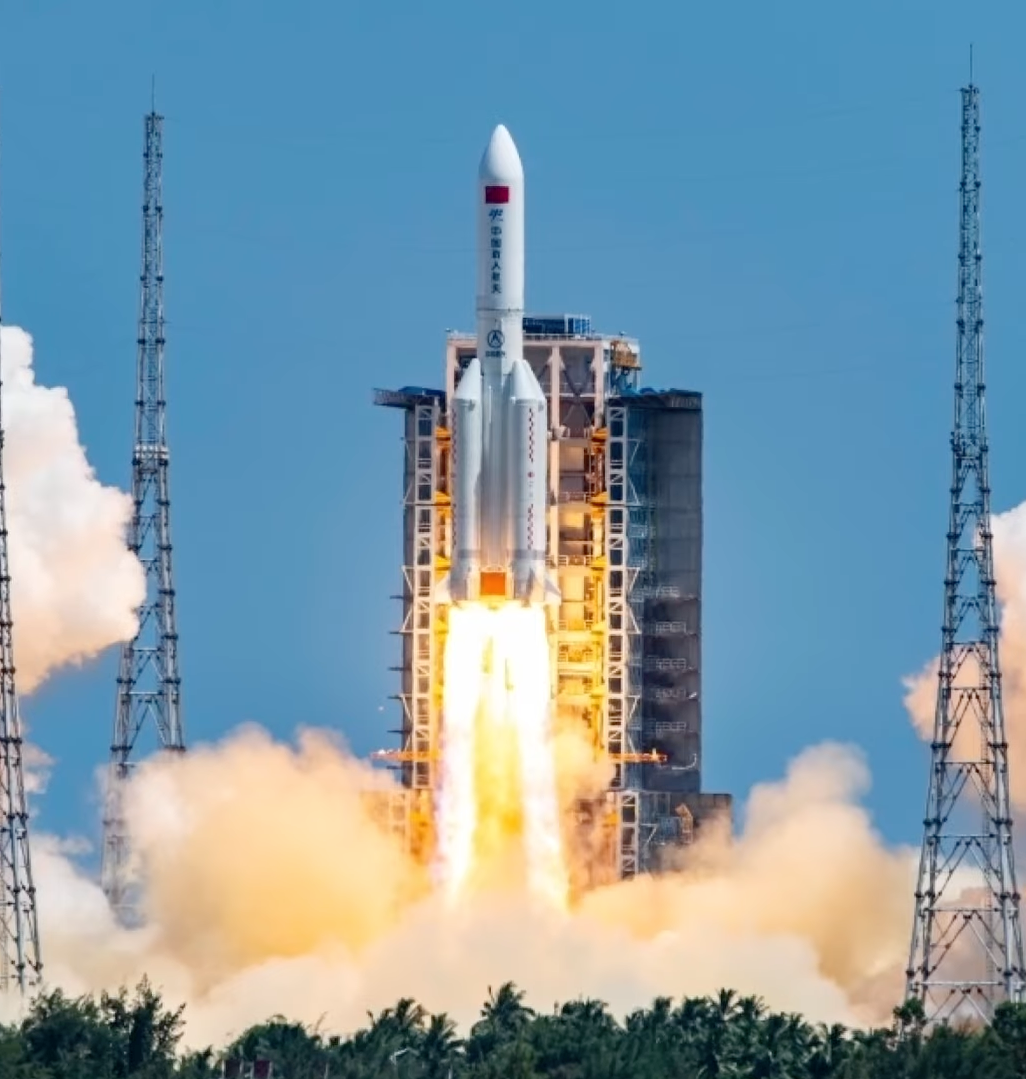
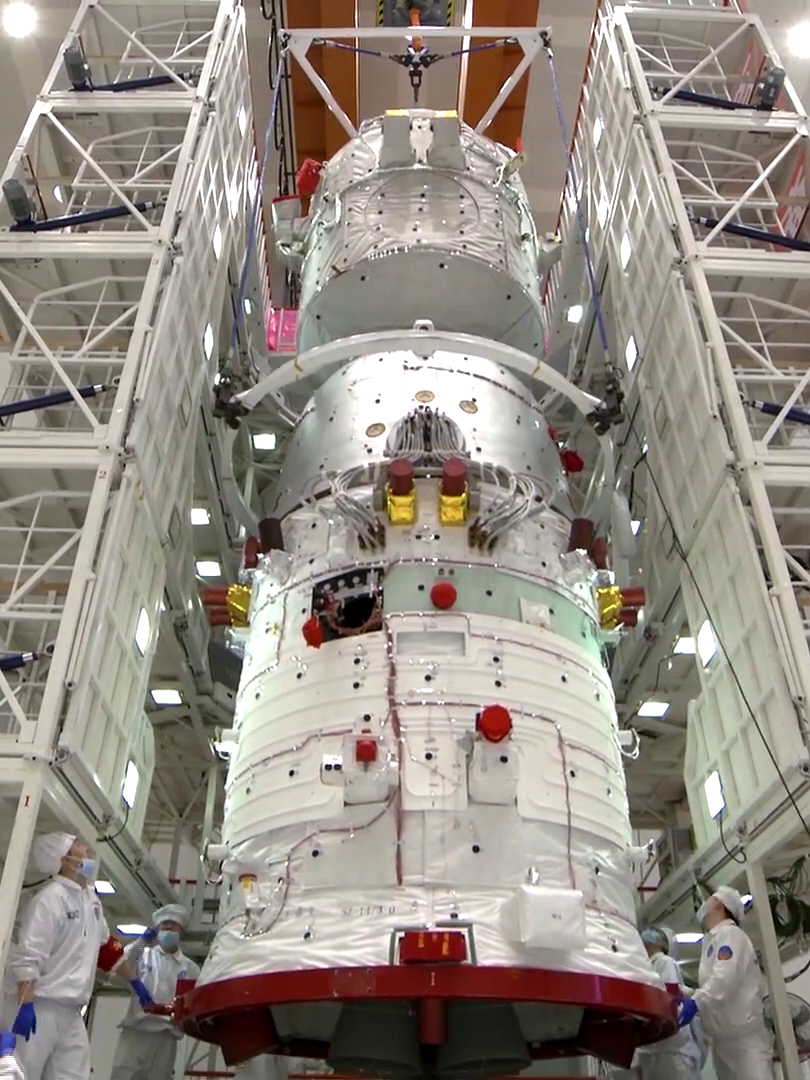
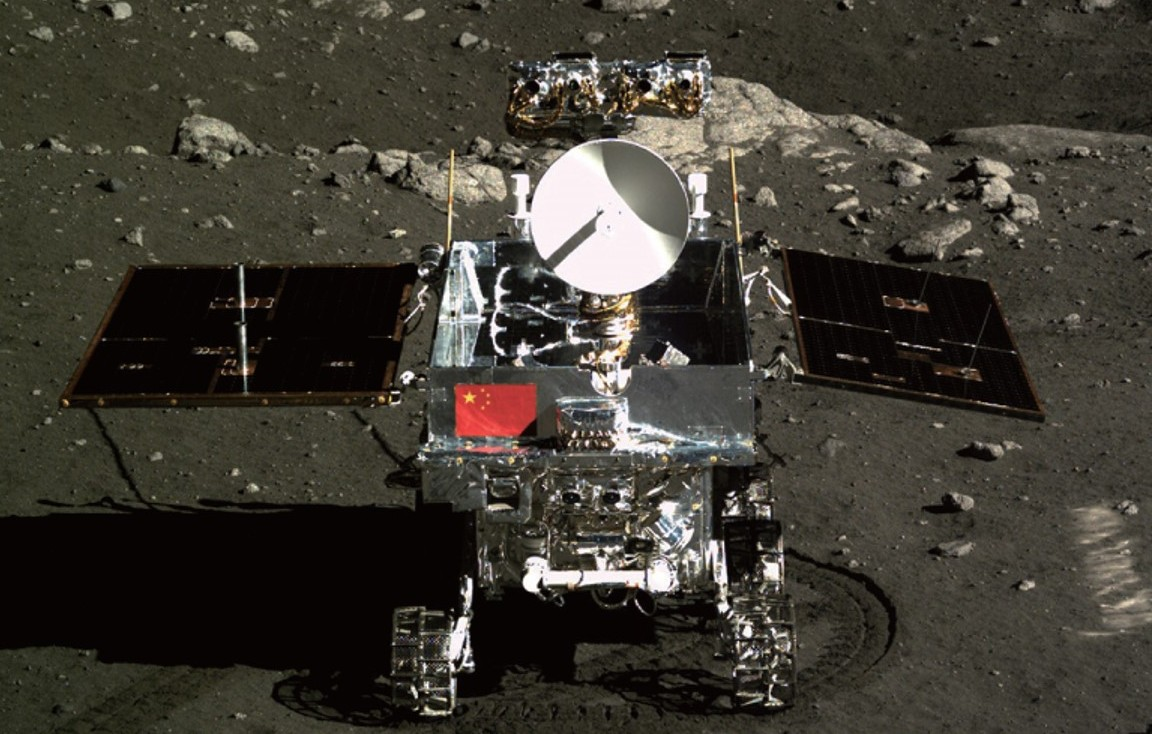
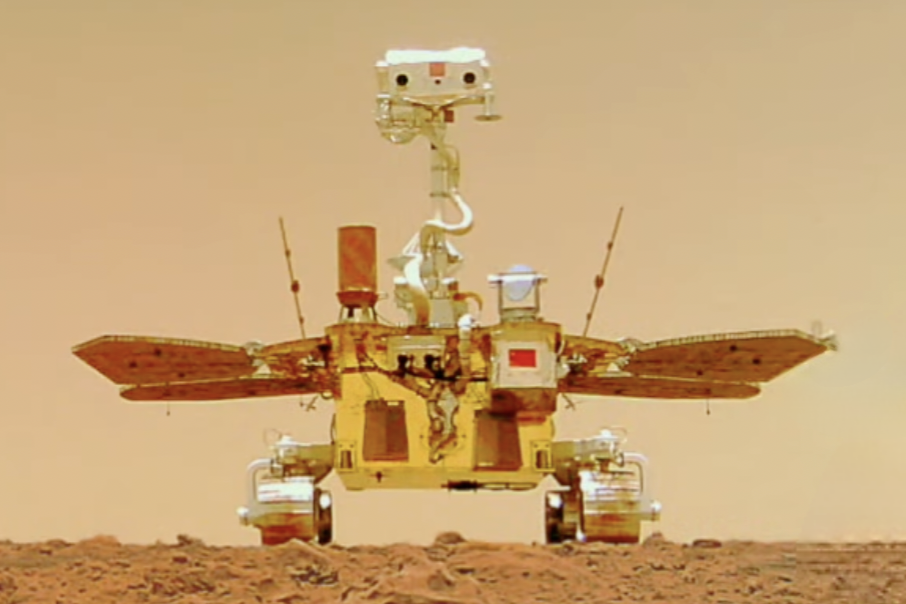
From left to right, top to bottom: Fei Junlong conducting a spacewalk from the Tiangong space station, Shenzhou 14 and 15 crews aboard Tiangong, Long March 5B launching Wentian, Shenzhou crewed spacecraft, Yutu lunar rover, Zhurong rover on Mars.

The Chinese space program is a major source of national pride. In 1970 the first Chinese satellite, Dong Fang Hong I, was launched. In 2003 China become the third country to independently send humans into space with Yang Liwei's spaceflight aboard Shenzhou 5. In 2008 China conducted a spacewalk with the Shenzhou 7 mission. In 2011 Tiangong-1 was launched which was the first step towards a Chinese space station around 2020. The active Chinese Lunar Exploration Program includes a lunar rover in 2013 and possibly a crewed lunar landing in the 2020s. Experience gained from the lunar program will be used for future programs such as exploration of Mars and Venus.

China plans to launch 5 commercial satellites for foreign customers in 2012 and aims to capture 15% of the commercial launch market and 10% of the satellite export market by 2015. In 2011 China launched a total of 19 rockets, which was the second most after Russia.

The Five hundred meter Aperture Spherical Telescope, completed in 2016, is the world's largest radio telescope.

In 2026, China reports reusable rocket breakthrough as it vies to catch up with the US.

=== Textiles ===
China in 2012 produced more than one-third of the developed world's apparel import but the share has been decreasing in recent years as low-technology and labor-intensive production has been moving to regions like Southeast Asia and Eastern Europe.

=== Transportation ===
Transportation infrastructure continues to be rapidly developed. The National Trunk Highway System was in 2011 estimated to surpass the US interstate system in length. Many Chinese cities have or are planning to build metros or other forms of rapid transit.

==== Commercial aircraft ====
The state owned Comac aerospace manufacturer aims to reduce Chinese dependency on foreign companies for large passenger aircraft. The future C919 aims to be completely made in China.

==== Motor vehicles ====
The automotive industry in China is the world's largest producer of motor vehicles. However, China's indigenous car companies have had difficulties on the global market and the growing electric vehicle market has been seen as way to remedy this. China in 2010 proposed controversial legislation requiring foreign electric vehicle producers to form minority joint-ventures and share technologies with Chinese carmakers in order to get market access. A 2011 report financed by the World Bank stated that China was becoming the world leader on electric vehicles.

==== Shipbuilding ====
In 2009-2010 China became the world's largest shipbuilder, however South Korea regained the top position in 2011 due to more advanced technology. China is developing its technological abilities and competition is expected to increase.

==== Trains ====
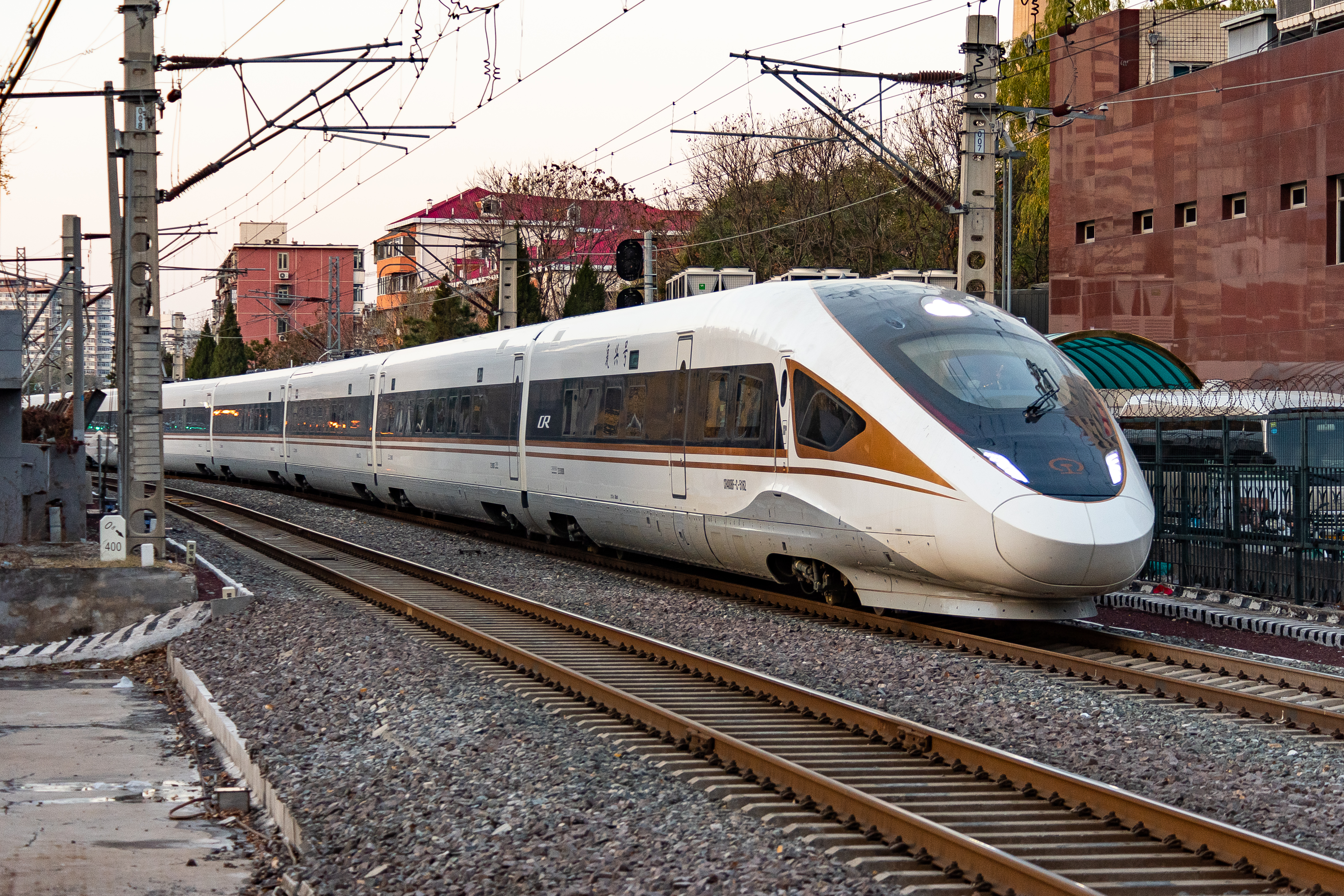
A Changchun-built CR400BF-C intelligent EMU in 2020

The BBC wrote in a 2011 article on high-speed rail in China that China in 2005 had no high-speed railways. In 2010 it had more than Europe and in 2012 China was expected to have more than the rest of the world combined. China demanded that foreign companies wanting to participate had to share their technology. Some 10,000 Chinese engineers and academics then in three years produced a faster Chinese high-speed train that China is now exporting to other nations.

== See also ==
- CERNET
- Chinese Academy of Sciences
- Chinese Academy of Engineering
- Chinese Academy of Social Sciences
- China–United States trade war (2018–present)
- CSTNET
- History of science and technology in the People's Republic of China
- List of Chinese inventions
- Made in China 2025
- Science in newly industrialized countries
- Sinofuturism
