= Tairex Agent Hospital =

Chinese virtual healthcare system

- Industry: Medical
- Founded: 2024
- Founder: Liu Yang
- Headquarters: Wuxi, Jiangsu, China
- Area served: China
- Parent: Tsinghua University
- Website: doctor.tairex.cn

Tairex Agent Hospital (Chinese: 紫荊AI醫院; pinyin: Zǐjīng AI yīyuàn) is a virtual healthcare system developed by Tairex (Chinese: 紫荊智康; pinyin: Zǐjīng zhìkāng), a Wuxi-based Chinese research company established in September 2024 that incubated by Institute for AI Industry Research of Tsinghua University. Initiated by Liu Yang, a professor in the university's Computer Science Department, Tairex Agent Hospital is aiming to support healthcare services through online systems, promote a balanced distribution of medical resources, and provide high-quality medical services to users worldwide. The system has 42 artificial intelligence doctors, covering 21 clinical departments, supporting the diagnosis of more than 1,000 diseases.

== History ==
Wuxi Tairex Technology Co. Ltd. was established in September 2024 under Tsinghua University’s Institute for Al Industry Research. Based in Wuxi, Jiangsu, the company primarily focuses on the research, development, and large-scale application in virtual medical system. On June 30, 2025, the company released an intelligent healthcare system called Agent Hospital 1, based on a large language model, and collaborations have been confirmed with medical institutions in regions such as Beijing, Jiangsu, and Guangxi. The project is initiated by Liu Yang, a professor in the university's Computer Science Department, and also the executive dean of the institute. The first human patient of the system was accepted in an internal test in July 2025.

In November 2025, it announced the completion of nearly RMB 100 million in angel round, which will be used for the research and development of its core product, Tairex Agent Hospital system—an intelligent agent‑centric virtual healthcare world where doctors, nurses, and patients are all driven by artificial intelligence based on large language models. The system simulates the entire healthcare process—from patient registration and consultation to examination, diagnosis, treatment, and follow-up—and can interact autonomously to enhance disease diagnosis and treatment capabilities and efficiency.

Until the end of 2025, Tairex Agent Hospital has created a database of over 500,000 AI patient cases covering different regions, age groups and disease types. Through continuous learning from large-scale case data, it simulates how human doctors accumulate experience and improve diagnostic accuracy in clinical practice. The system currently covers 21 clinical departments, including emergency medicine, thoracic medicine, pediatrics, dermatology and cardiology. With 42 AI doctors, the system can treat 10,000 patients within just a few days and have achieved an accuracy rate over 96% on the MedQA medical question-answering dataset, supporting diagnosis across more than 1,000 disease types.

== See more ==
- Artificial intelligence in healthcare
