= OCCAID =

Non-profit consortium

The Open Contributors Corporation for Advanced Internet Development (OCCAID) was a non-profit consortium that operated one of the largest IPv6 research networks in the world. It maintained both resale and facilities-based networks spanning 15,000 miles, with a presence in over 52 cities across 6 countries. This organisation no longer operates, what occurred to this organisation is unclear as there is very little information available for this organisation, apart from their official website.

OCCAID facilitated collaboration between research communities and the carrier industry, serving as a testbed and proving ground for advanced Internet protocols. Most of its participants connected to the network using Ethernet connections in areas where OCCAID has last-mile network connections.

OCCAID's primary collaboration activities had involved IPv6 and multicast protocols.

== See also ==
- China Next Generation Internet
