= CSTNET =

CSTNET or China Science and Technology Network (Chinese: 中国科技网; pinyin: Zhōngguó kējī wǎng) offers Internet services to the Chinese education, research, scientific and technical communities, relevant government departments and hi-tech enterprises, providing services such as network access, host trusteeship, virtual host and domain name registration etc. On April 20, 1994, CSTNET launched the first national formal Internet link and this became the earliest direct global connected Internet in the country.

== See also ==
- CERNET
- National research and education network
- China Next Generation Internet
- ChinaNet
