= Tsinghua University Computer Science Department =

Department of Tsinghua University

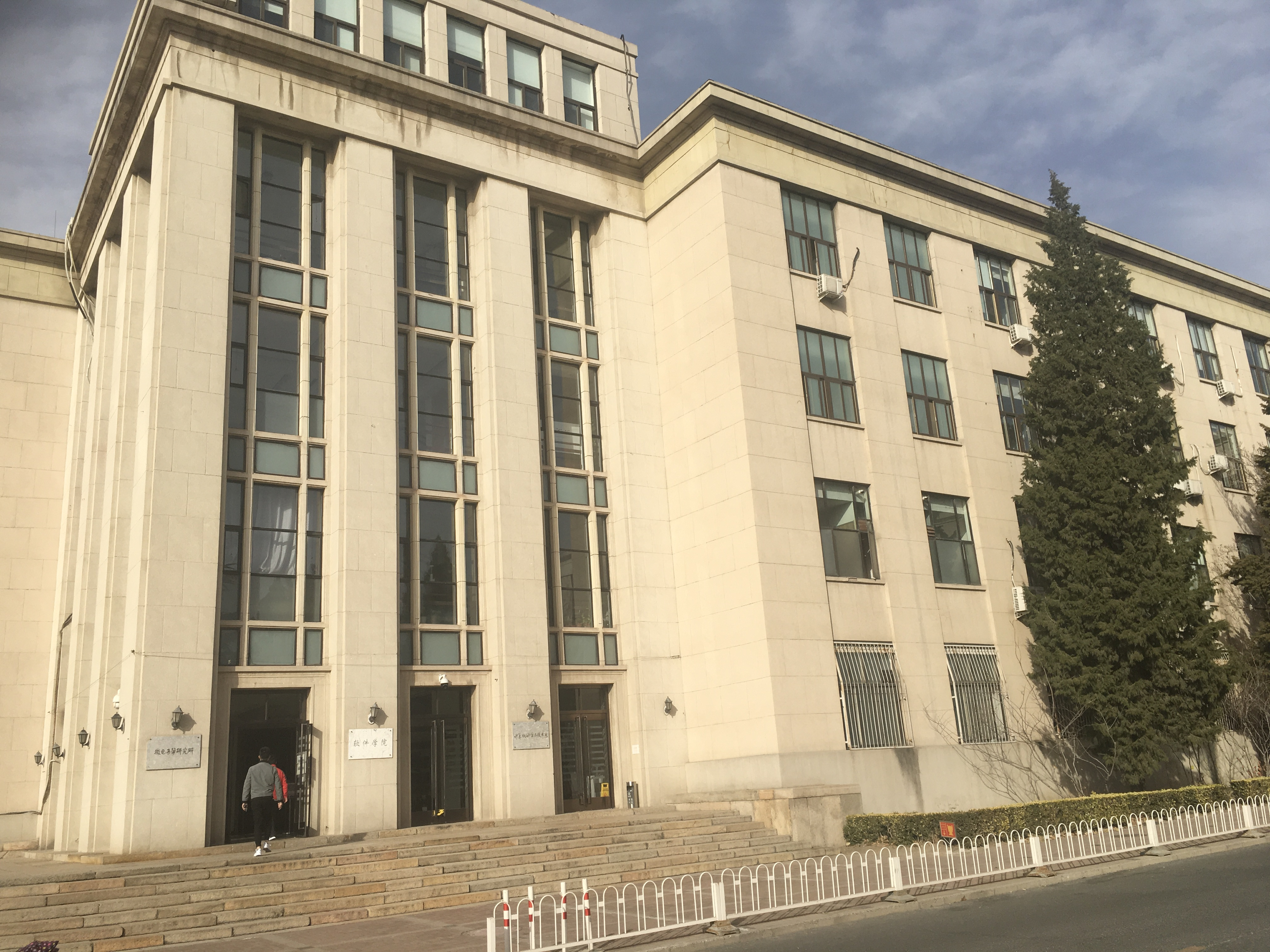
East Main Building of the Department of Computer Science, Tsinghua University

The Tsinghua University Computer Science Department, officially the Department of Computer Science and Technology, Tsinghua University, is a top Computer Science Department in China. Established in 1956, it has developed into a large department in Tsinghua University.

== History ==
In 1956, a computer major was established in the Radio Department of Tsinghua University. It was one of the earliest computer science programs in China.

In June 1958, Tsinghua University established the Department of Automatic Control, encompassing the Computer Science major (moved from the Radio Department). In the same year, the non-linear analog computer model 551 was made in the new department.

In 1959, the tube-based digital computer model 911 was built in the department.

In 1965, the full-transistor digital computer model 112 was made in the department.

In the 1970s, the first mini-computer made in China, i.e., the DG-Nova compatible mini-computer of the DJS-100 series (models 130, 140, etc.) was born in the department. Thousands of units were produced and installed.

In 1979, the Department of Automatic Control was renamed the "Department of Computer Engineering and Science".

In 1978 and 1981, the Master and Ph.D programs were launched in the department respectively.

In 1984, the Department was renamed the "Department of Computer Science and Technology".

In the 1980s, an Apple compatible micro computer CEC-1 was built at the Department. In addition, China's first IBM compatible micro computer 0520-C, jointly developed by Tsinghua and two other organizations, was put into massive production.

In the 1990s, Tsinghua University led the development and operation of the CERNET.

In the 2000s, Tsinghua University led the development and operation of CNGI-CERNET2, the largest pure IPv6 network in the world.

In 2025, Professor Zhang Min of the Department was selected into the ACM SIGIR Academy, recognizing her contributions to information retrieval.

== Current status ==
=== Institutional settings ===
The Department comprises the Institute of Computing Software, Institute of High Performance Computing, Institute of Human-computer Interaction(HCI) and Media Integration, Institute of Artificial Intelligence, Institute of Computer Network and Institute of fundamental and experimental education on computer science. The department has also established joint labs with IBM, Intel, Microsoft, etc. In addition, there are joint laboratories for teaching and research with Tencent, Sogou, Microsoft, and Huawei etc.

The Department currently has 105 teachers, including 49 professors, 47 associate professors, and 9 intermediate professors. There are 6 academicians of the Chinese Academy of Sciences and the Chinese Academy of Engineering, 3 leading talents of the Thousand Talents Program, 8 distinguished professors of the Yangtze River Scholars Program, 17 recipients of the National Outstanding Young Scientist Fund, 3 young top talents, 4 young Yangtze River Scholars, and 12 recipients of the Excellent Youth Fund.

=== Course schedule ===
In addition to the required courses, students majoring in Computer Science and Technology also take foundational and specialized courses in advanced language programming, discrete mathematics, data structures, signal processing principles, system analysis and control, digital logic, introduction to artificial intelligence, microcomputer technology, operating systems, assembly language programming, computer principles, computer system structure, compiler theory, computer networks, and professional English reading. Currently, the department has three graduate programs: Computer System Structure, Computer Software and Theory, and Computer Application Technology. All of the above programs can award master's and doctoral degrees. In addition, the department also has a postdoctoral research station for computer science and technology. The department has trained more than 10,000 first-rate researchers and practitioners, and established collaborative relationships with many world-class universities and research institutions.

== Rankings ==
In the "2024 Global Ranking of Academic Subjects" by ShanghaiRanking Consultancy, Tsinghua University ranked 2, only after Massachusetts Institute of Technology (MIT). In the 2025 "Best Global Universities for Computer Science" of the USNews Ranking, Tsinghua University ranked 1st. In the "QS World University Rankings by Subject 2025: Computer Science and Information Systems", Tsinghua University ranked 11th.
