= China Next Generation Internet =

Rollout of IPv6 across China

The China Next Generation Internet (CNGI; simplified Chinese: 中国下一代互联网; traditional Chinese: 中國下一代互聯網; pinyin: Zhōngguó Xià Yīdài Hùliánwǎng) project is an ongoing plan for the accelerated rollout and application of the IPv6 protocol nationwide.

An author from the China Academy of Information and Communications Technology (CAICT) summarized IPv6 protocol as "not yet the whole of the next-generation Internet" but merely the beginning and a platform for the next generation of the Internet. China has aimed for widespread deployment in cloud computing, 5G, Internet of Things (IoT) and self driving vehicles. All of which requires a lot of IP addresses and why the IPv6 rollout is highly valued as it provides near limitless IP addresses and can accommodate the country's rapid growth in new-age technologies.

According to Viktorija Ratomske, an expert at IPXO, the advantage of having a 'single stack' IPv6 network for China is that "IPv6 exceeds IPv4 in complexity and efficiency, allowing smoother overall network connectivity and simpler network management. It also enables much greater connection speeds, as IPv6 traffic doesn’t need to pass through carrier NAT systems". In addition, unlike IPv4, the new protocol has an integrated IPsec feature which is considered safer, can run end-to-end encryption and prevents third parties from gathering data, resulting in a more secured network nationwide.

== Key CNGI goals ==
According to a brochure entitled "CNGI-CERNET2/61X", the CNGI effort's key tasks were as follows:

- Construction of China's next generation Internet backbones
- Development of key network technology and major applications for the next generation Internet
- Promotion of industrialization and application development of next generation Internet equipment and software
- Participation in international organizations, and playing an important role in standards setting

IPv6 was selected as key technology. The United States has almost one third of the theoretical maximum IPv4 addresses (about 4.3 billion [255^4 - 19M] ), while China has more high-speed Internet users than IP addresses and the largest Internet user base of any country.

== History ==
As of October 2009, the CNGI effort comprises six nationwide backbone networks and 39 GigaPOPs (Gigapop is short for gigabit point-of-presence, an access point to Internet2), which extends the next generation footprint to over 20 major cities and over 300 academic, industrial, and government research campuses within China. Five backbones are commercial (operated by China Telecom, China Unicom, China Netcom/CSTNET, China Mobile, and China Railcom), with an additional academic research network operated by CERNET, which is known as CNGI-CERNET2. CNGI also encompasses two exchange points (IX) in Beijing (named CNGI-6IX) and Shanghai for interconnecting these backbones and for international links to APAN (Asia Pacific Advanced Network), GEANT, and Internet2.

China showcased CNGI and the IPv6 network infrastructure at the 2008 Olympics in Beijing for the website www.beijing2008.cn. The launching of the domain ipv6.beijing2008.cn was witnessed by officials from Tsinghua University, the CERNET, the Technology Department of the Beijing Organizing Committee for the Olympic Games and Sohu.com.

== Current status ==
In July 2021, China's office of the Central Committee for Cybersecurity and Information announced a plan to increase the nation's IPv6 traffic share to 50 percent by the end of 2023 and to as much as 70 percent traffic share and reach 800 million IPv6 addresses by the end of 2025, and finally phasing out IPv4 and replacing it completely with IPv6 technology by around 2030.

== See also ==
- IPv6 deployment in China
- EUChinaGRID
- OCCAID
- China Education and Research Network (CERNET)
- Telecommunications industry in China
