= CERNET =

Academic computer network in China

The China Education and Research Network (CERNET; Chinese: 中国教育和科研计算机网; pinyin: Zhōngguó jiàoyù hé kēyán jìsuànjī wǎng) is the first nationwide education and research computer network in China. The CERNET project is funded by the Chinese government and directly managed by the Chinese Ministry of Education. It is constructed and operated by Tsinghua University and the other leading Chinese universities.

== Structure ==
CERNET has a four-layer hierarchy (the nationwide backbone, regional networks, provincial networks and campus networks). CERNET National Center is located in Tsinghua University, which is responsible for operation and management of CERNET backbone nationwide. The ten regional network centers and main nodes are distributed in Tsinghua University, Peking University, Beijing University of Posts and Telecommunications, Shanghai Jiaotong University, Xi'an Jiaotong University, Huazhong University of Science and Technology, South China Institute of Technology, University of Electronic Science and Technology of China, Southeast University and Northeast University, which are responsible for operation, management, planning and construction of CERNET regional backbones.

CERNET provincial nodes are distributed among 38 universities in 36 cities around the country.

== Data and statistics ==
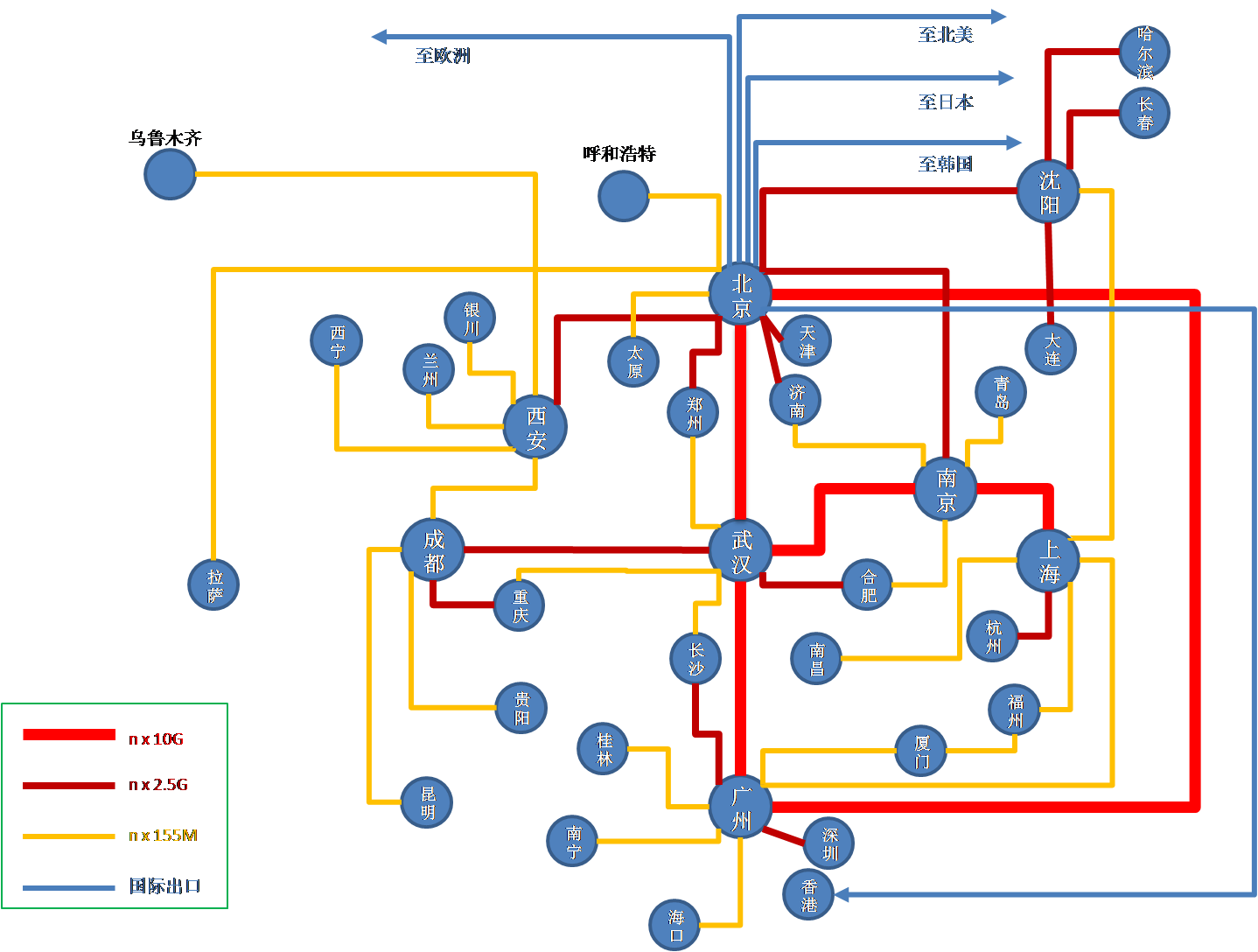
Sketch of the CERNET backbone

By the end of 2000, bandwidth of CERNET backbone has been up to 2.5 Gbit/s. CERNET has 12 global and regional channels connected with the United States, Canada, the UK, Germany, Japan and Hong Kong, the international gateway bandwidth over 250 Mbit/s. The transmission rate of the regional networks has reached 155 Mbit/s. More than 2,000 education and research institutions, 1.2 million PCs and 20 million end users have connected to CERNET.

== Developments ==
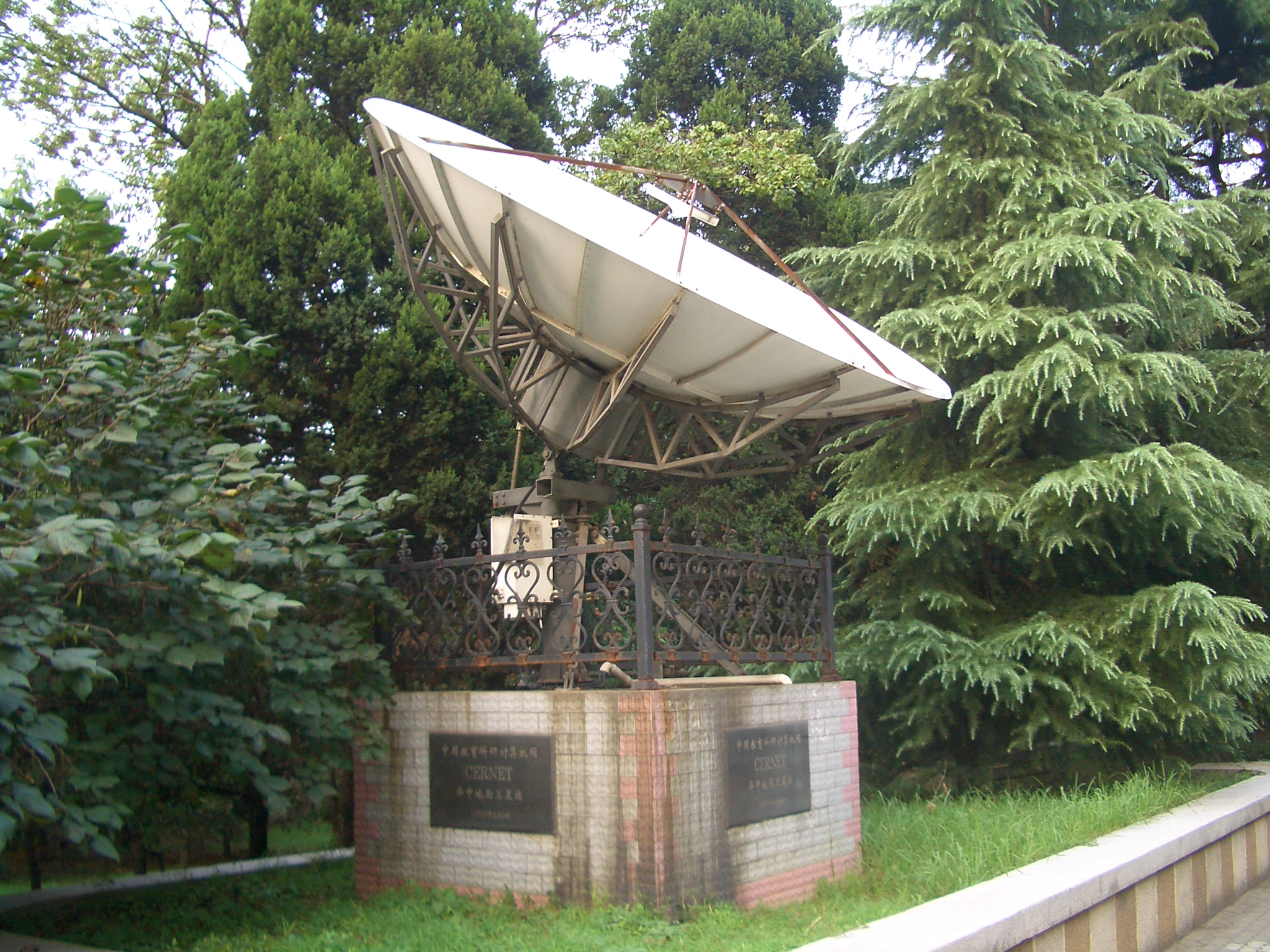
An early CERNET satellite ground station, displayed as a memorial on the Huazhong University of Science and Technology campus in Wuhan

CERNET has been powered to allow access by most higher education institutions nationwide with backbone upgrades and expansions having been accomplished in eight regions. The large-scale China Education Information System has been built up. Mirroring systems for discipline-specific information of famous overseas universities, and a full-text search system for higher education and key subject information will soon be set up.

CERNET is an important platform for China's remote learning initiative. To accommodate demands of distance learning program as defined in Education Revitalizing Initiative Oriented to 21st century, CERNET high-speed backbone was started in 1999. By leveraging the existing fiber infrastructure and resources from state and local treasury, CERNET has completed 40% of the 20,000 km high-speed transmission link crossing 29 provincial capitals, and cut over the 2.5G high-speed trunks from Beijing via Wuhan to Guangzhou, and from Wuhan via Nanjing to Shanghai. Nowadays, the medium-to-high-speed regional network (155M) connecting 21 cities is just under construction. Some 40 to 50 universities and colleges have accessed to CERNET backbone at speed of 10M to 100M.

As a pioneer in Internet study in China, operation of CERNET and advancing CERNET management. CERNET, a computer network independently designed, constructed and managed by technical personnel at home, is technologically powerful. In network construction, CERNET attaches highest importance to network security. In 1999, CERNET set up China's first network contingency response center called CCERT. Up to date, CCERT has handled more than 2000 network security cases, efficiently ensuring normal operation of CERNET and advancing CERNET management.

== Experimentation and research ==
CERNET is also the experiment platform for China to proceed with study on next generation of Internet applications, and has played a major role in the China Next Generation Internet effort. Relying on current network facilities and technical competence, CERNET has set up the IPv6, an experiment platform with nationwide coverage. In 1998, CERNET joined 6bone, an experimental IP-based network of next generation, and became a backbone member of it in November. CERNET is the first in China that interconnects with Internet2, the next generation of Internet, providing its users with an easy access to Internet2.

CERNET is an important cultivation base for information and network professionals in China. For example, in the study program for computer information network and its application in the "State Key Sci-tech Breakthrough Project during Ninth Five-Year Plan Period", researchers from CERNET and other partner organizations published more than one hundred academic papers both at home and abroad, representing a significant achievement in IT competence fostering.

Furthermore, CERNET supports and guarantees implementation of a batch of important Internet application projects in China. For example, the on-line enrollment and admission system played a crucial role in the 2000 admission season around the country. Moreover, CERNET enhances the information infrastructure in China, shortens the gap between China and the west in information industry, and plays a pioneer role in China's information initiative.

== See also ==
- China's Next Generation Internet
- EUChinaGRID
- IPv6 deployment in China
- Ministry of Education of the People's Republic of China
