= List of internet exchange points =

This is a list of internet exchange points (IXPs). There are several sources for IXP locations, including Packet Clearing House, who have maintained the earliest list of IXPs, with global coverage since 1994. Also, Telegeography, PeeringDB and the Network Startup Resource Center. Additionally, there are internet exchange point associations that publish lists of member IXPs. Some of the internet exchange point associations are loosely grouped into the Internet Exchange Point Federation.

For more information on the largest IXPs, see list of internet exchange points by size.

== Introduction ==
The columns used in the lists below include the following information:

- Region: The official regional internet registry (RIR) regions.
- Country: Uses ISO 3166-1 alpha-3 to display the country flag.
- City: A reference to a city article within Wikipedia.
- Name: Longname (Shortname). Entries flagged with an asterisk (*) do not appear in PeeringDB.
- IX-F region: IX-F region with which the IXP is associated.

== Active internet exchanges ==
The IXPs in this list have a working webpage, are listed in PeeringDB, or both.

=== Africa ===
Region	Country: City/Region	Name	IX-F region
Africa	Angola: Luanda	Angola Internet Exchange (Angola-IXP, ANG-IX)	Af-IX
Africa	Angola: Luanda	Angola Internet Exchange (Angonix)	Af-IX
Africa	Benin: Cotonou	Benin Internet Exchange Point (BENIN-IX)	Af-IX
Africa	Botswana: Gaborone	Botswana Internet Exchange (BINX) *	Af-IX
Africa	Cameroon, Republic of: Yaounde, Douala	Cameroon Internet eXchange (CAMIX)	Af-IX
Africa	Cameroon, Republic of: Douala	Douala [Neutral] Internet eXchange (Douala-IX)	Af-IX
Africa	Congo, Republic of: Brazzaville	Congo Internet eXchange (CGIX)	Af-IX
Africa	Congo, Democratic Republic of: Kinshasa	Kinshasa Internet Exchange (RDC-IX/KINIX)	Af-IX
Africa	Djibouti: Djibouti	The Djibouti Internet Exchange (DjIX)	Af-IX
Africa	Gambia: Serekunda	Serekunda Internet Exchange Point (SIXP)	Af-IX
Africa	Ghana: Accra	Ghana Internet Exchange (GIX)	Af-IX
Africa	Ivory Coast: Abidjan	Côte d'Ivoire Internet Exchange Point (CIVIX)	Af-IX
Africa	Kenya: Nairobi	Kenya Internet Exchange (KIXP)	Af-IX
Africa	Lesotho: Maseru	Lesotho Internet Exchange Point (LIXP)	Af-IX
Africa	Madagascar: Antananarivo	Madagascar Global Internet eXchange (MGIX)	Af-IX
Africa	Malawi: Blantyre	Malawi Internet Exchange (MIX-BT)	Af-IX
Africa	Mauritius: Ebene CyberCity	Mauritius Internet Exchange Point (MIXP)	Af-IX
Africa	Morocco: Rabat	Morocco Internet Exchange Point (MARIX)	Af-IX
Africa	Morocco: Casablanca	Casablanca Internet Exchange Point (CASIX)	Af-IX
Africa	Mozambique: Maputo	Mozambique Internet Exchange (MOZ-IX)	Af-IX
Africa	Namibia: Windhoek	Windhoek Internet Exchange Point (WHK-IX)	Af-IX
Africa	Nigeria: Lagos	Internet Exchange Point of Nigeria (IXPN)	Af-IX
Africa	Réunion: Saint-Denis	REUNIX	Af-IX
Africa	Rwanda: Kigali	Rwanda Information & Communication Technology Association (RICTA)	Af-IX
Africa	Rwanda: Kigali	Rwanda Internet Exchange (RINEX)	Af-IX
Africa	South Africa: Cape Town	Cape Town Internet Exchange (CINX)	Af-IX
Africa	South Africa: Durban	Durban Internet Exchange (DINX)	Af-IX
Africa	South Africa: Johannesburg	Johannesburg Internet Exchange (JINX)	Af-IX
Africa	South Africa: Cape Town	NAPAfrica Cape Town (NAPAfrica CT1)	Af-IX
Africa	South Africa: Johannesburg	NAPAfrica Johannesburg (NAPAfrica JB1)	Af-IX
Africa	South Africa: Durban	NAPAfrica Durban (NAPAfrica DB1)	Af-IX
Africa	South Africa: Gqebera	Nelson Mandela Bay Internet Exchange Point (NMBINX)	Af-IX
Africa	Sudan: Khartoum	Sudanese Internet Exchange Point (SIXP)*	Af-IX
Africa	Eswatini	Swaziland Peering Point (SISPA)	Af-IX
Africa	Tanzania: Dar es Salaam	Tanzania Internet eXchange (TIX)	Af-IX
Africa	Tanzania: Zanzibar	ZIXP – Zanzibar internet Exchange Point, www.zixp.or.tz *	Af-IX
Africa	Tanzania: Arusha	Arusha Internet Exchange Point (AIXP)*	Af-IX
Africa	Uganda: Kampala	Uganda Internet Exchange Point (UIXP)	Af-IX
Africa	Zambia: Lusaka	Lusaka IXP (Lusaka IXP)	Af-IX
Africa	Zimbabwe: Harare	Zimbabwe Internet Exchange (ZINX)*	Af-IX

=== Asia ===
Region	Country: City/Region	Name	IX-F region
Asia	Bangladesh: Dhaka	Bangladesh Internet Exchange (BDIX)	APIX
Asia	Bangladesh: Dhaka	Level3 Carrier	APIX
Asia	Bangladesh: Dhaka	Novocom NIX	APIX
Asia	Cambodia: Phnom Penh	Cambodian Network Exchange (CNX)*	APIX
Asia	Cambodia: Phnom Penh	Cambodia Internet Exchange HT Networks: HTN-CIX Phnom Penh	
Asia	China: Beijing	CHN-IX	APIX
Asia	China: Beijing	CNC Beijing NAP	APIX
Asia	China: Guangzhou	CHN-IX	APIX
Asia	China: Shanghai	CHN-IX	APIX
Asia	China: Hong Kong	AMS-IX Hong Kong	APIX
Asia	China: Hong Kong	BroadBand Internet eXchange Hong Kong (BBIX)	APIX
Asia	China: Hong Kong	Hong Kong Internet Exchange (HKIX)	APIX
Asia	China: Hong Kong	ACME Communications Telecom Internet Exchange IX	APIX
Asia	China: Hong Kong	Equinix Hong Kong	APIX
Asia	China: Hong Kong	iAdvantage Internet Exchange (iAIX)	APIX
Asia	China: Hong Kong	Megaport-IX	APIX
Asia	China: Hong Kong	Pacswitch Internet Exchange (PacIX-HK)	APIX
Asia	China: Hong Kong	Powernetix	APIX
Asia	China: Hong Kong	Sun Network (Hong Kong) Limited (SunNetwork)	APIX
Asia	Indonesia: Jakarta	Access Internet eXchange	APIX
Asia	Indonesia: Jakarta	Transhybrid Xchange	APIX
Asia	Indonesia: Jakarta	PESATnet IPv6 (PESATnet)	APIX
Asia	Indonesia: Jakarta	PT Pasifik Satelit Nusantara (ISP)	APIX
Asia	Indonesia: Jakarta	PT. Sumberdata Indonesia	APIX
Asia	Indonesia: Jakarta	PT Multidata Rancana Prima	APIX
Asia	Indonesia: Jakarta	Cyber 2 Internet Exchange (C2IX)	APIX
Asia	Indonesia: Jakarta	PT. Cyberindo Aditama (CBN)	APIX
Asia	Indonesia: Jakarta	National Inter Connection Exchange (OpenIXP/NICE)	APIX
Asia	Indonesia: Jakarta	Indonesia Internet Exchange (IIX)	APIX
Asia	Indonesia: Jakarta	Matrix Cable Internet Exchange (MCIX)	APIX
Asia	Indonesia: Jakarta	Biznet Internet Exchange (BIXc)	APIX
Asia	Indonesia: Jakarta	Mora Internet Exchange (MIX)*	APIX
Asia	Indonesia: Jakarta	PT. Cyberplus Media Pratama *	APIX
Asia	Indonesia: Jakarta	PT Rizky Data Jaya (smalloon)	APIX
Asia	Indonesia: Yogyakarta	Citranet Internet Exchange (CIX)	APIX
Asia	Indonesia: Yogyakarta	Universitas Negeri Yogyakarta Internet Exchange Point (UNY-IX)	APIX
Asia	Indonesia: Surabaya	IIX Jawa Timur (IIX JI)	APIX
Asia	Indonesia: Sumedang	I-Blog	APIX
Asia	Indonesia: Surabaya	Omadata Internet Exchange (ODIX) *	APIX
Asia	Indonesia: Surabaya	PT Cross Network Indonesia *	APIX
Asia	Indonesia: Medan	PT.Pastindo Sejahtera Bersama	APIX
Asia	Indonesia: Palembang	PT. Sakti Putra Mandiri	APIX
Asia	India: Amaravati	AMR IX	APIX
Asia	India: Chennai, Delhi, Hyderabad, Kolkata, Mumbai	Extreme IX	APIX
Asia	India: Kolkata	Kolkata IX	APIX
Asia	India: Kolkata, Mumbai	AMS India	APIX
Asia	India: Mumbai, Delhi, Chennai, Kolkata	DE-CIX India (Mumbai IX has been acquired by DE-CIX)	APIX
Asia	India: Chennai, Delhi, Durgapur, Hyderabad, Kolkata, Mumbai, Bardhaman	National Internet Exchange of India (NIXI)	APIX
Asia	Japan: Niigata	Echigo Internet Exchange	APIX
Asia	Japan: Osaka, Tokyo, Fukuoka, China: Hong Kong, Singapore, Thailand: Bangkok	BBIX	APIX
Asia	Japan: Ōita	OCT Internet Service	APIX
Asia	Japan: Tokyo, Osaka	Equinix Japan	APIX
Asia	Japan: Tokyo, Osaka, Fukuoka	Japan Network Access Point (JPNAP)	APIX
Asia	Japan: Tokyo, Osaka, Fukuoka	Japan Internet Exchange (JPIX)	APIX
Asia	Japan: Tokyo	mpls Associo	APIX
Asia	Japan: Tokyo, Osaka	Network Service Provider Internet eXchange Point (NSPIXP)	APIX
Asia	Japan: Okinawa Urasoe	RYUKYUs Internet eXchange Point (RYUKYUIX – RIX)	APIX
Asia	Kazakhstan: Almaty	Kazakhstan Internet Exchange (KAZ-IX)	APIX
Asia	South Korea: Seoul	Korea Internet Neutral Exchange (KINX)	APIX
Asia	South Korea: Seoul	Boranet LGDACOM IX	APIX
Asia	Malaysia: Johor Bahru, Kuala Lumpur, Cyberjaya	Johor Bahru Internet Exchange (JBIX)	APIX
Asia	Malaysia: Kuala Lumpur, Cyberjaya, Penang, Johor Bahru, Kuching, Kota Kinabalu	Malaysia Internet Exchange (MyIX)	APIX
Asia	Mongolia: Ulaanbaatar	OpenMIX	APIX
Asia	Nepal: Kathmandu	Nepal Internet Exchange (npIX)	APIX
Asia	Nepal: Biratnagar	Hamro Internet Exchange (HamroIX)	tbd
Asia	Pakistan: Karachi	Pakistan Internet Exchange (PIE)	APIX
Asia	Philippines: Metro Manila	Globe Internet Exchange (GIX)	APIX
Asia	Philippines: Metro Manila	Manila Internet Exchange (Manila IX)	APIX
Asia	Philippines: Metro Manila	Philippine Open Internet Exchange (PhOPENIX)	APIX
Asia	Philippines: Metro Manila	Philippine Common Routing Exchange (PHNET CORE)	APIX
Asia	Philippines: Metro Manila	Bayan Telecommunications Internet and Gaming Exchange	APIX
Asia	Philippines: Metro Manila	GETAFIX.PH	APIX
Asia	Russia: Krasnoyarsk	Krasnoyarsk Internet Exchange (KRS-IX)	APIX
Asia	Russia: Krasnoyarsk	Sibir-IX	APIX
Asia	Russia: Krasnoyarsk	RED-IX	APIX
Asia	Russia: Omsk	Omsk Internet Exchange (OMSK-IX)	APIX
Asia	Russia: Vladivostok	Vladivostok IX (VLV-IX)	APIX
Asia	Singapore	BroadBand Internet eXchange Singapore (BBIX)	APIX
Asia	Singapore	Equinix Singapore	APIX
Asia	Singapore	Megaport-IX	APIX
Asia	Singapore	Singapore Open Exchange (SOX)	APIX
Asia	Singapore	Singapore Internet Exchange (SGIX)	APIX
Asia	Taiwan: Taipei	Taiwan Network Access Point (TWNAP)	APIX
Asia	Taiwan: Taipei	Taipei Internet Exchange (TPIX)	APIX
Asia	Taiwan: Taipei	Taiwan Internet Exchange (TWIX)	APIX
Asia	Taiwan: Taipei	Student & Technology United Internet Exchanges (STUIX)	
Asia	Taiwan: Taipei	Eastern Broadband Internet Exchange (EBIX)	APIX
Asia	Thailand: Bangkok	Bangkok Neutral Internet Exchange (BKNIX)	APIX
Asia	Thailand: Bangkok	CAT Telecom National Internet Exchange by CAT (CAT-NIX)	APIX
Asia	Thailand: Bangkok	CS Loxinfo National Internet Exchange (CSL-NIX) *	APIX
Asia	Thailand: Bangkok	Symphony Internet Exchange (SYMC-IX) *	APIX
Asia	Thailand: Bangkok	TOT National Internet Exchange by TOT (TOT-NIX) *	APIX
Asia	Thailand: Bangkok	True Internet Gateway National Internet Exchange (TIG-NIX)*	APIX
Asia	Thailand: Bangkok	Jastel Network Internet Exchange (Jastel-IX) *	APIX
Asia	Thailand: Bangkok	Dtac Network Co., Ltd. (DTN)	APIX
Asia	United States: Hagåtña	Guam Internet Exchange (GU-IX)	APIX
Asia	United States: Honolulu	DRFortress Exchange	APIX
Asia	United States: Honolulu	Hawaii Internet eXchange (HIX)	APIX
Asia	Vietnam: Hanoi	FPT Group *	APIX
Asia	Vietnam: Hanoi	Digicom Co., Ltd (VTC)	APIX
Asia	Vietnam: Hanoi	Hanoi Telecom *	APIX
Asia	Vietnam: Ho Chi Minh City	Saigon Postel Corp. (SPT) *	APIX
Asia	Vietnam: Hanoi	VietNam Internet eXchange (VNIX) *	APIX
Asia	Vietnam: Hanoi	Vietnam Posts and Telecommunications Group*	APIX
Asia	Vietnam: Hanoi	Viettel ISP	APIX
Asia	Uzbekistan: Tashkent	Tashkent Internet Exchange (TAS-IX) *	APIX

=== Europe ===
Region	Country: City/Region	Name	IX-F region
Europe	Albania: Tirana	Albanian Internet eXchange (ALB-IX)*	Euro-IX
Europe	Albania: Tirana	Albanian Neutral Internet eXchange (ANIX)	Euro-IX
Europe	Armenia: Yerevan	Armenian Internet Traffic Exchange Foundation (ARMIX)	Euro-IX
Europe	Austria: Klagenfurt	Alpes Adria Internet Exchange (AAIX)	Euro-IX
Europe	Austria: Graz	Graz Internet Exchange (GRAX)	Euro-IX
Europe	Austria: Salzburg	Salzburg Internet eXchange (SAIX)	Euro-IX
Europe	Austria: Tirol	Tirol-IX (T-IX)	Euro-IX
Europe	Austria: Vienna	Vienna Internet Exchange (VIX)	Euro-IX
Europe	Liechtenstein: Eschen, Austria: Feldkirch, Switzerland: Gais, Frauenfeld, Germany: Konstanz	Rheintal Internet Exchange (Rheintal IX)	Euro-IX
Europe	Belarus: Minsk	Belarusian Internet Exchange (BY-IX)	Euro-IX
Europe	Belgium: Brussels	Belgian National Internet eXchange (BNIX)	Euro-IX
Europe	Belgium: Brussels	BelgiumIX	
Europe	Belgium: Brussels	NL-ix (Pan-European distributed Exchange)	Euro-IX
Europe	Bulgaria: Sofia	Balkan Internet Exchange (B-IX)	Euro-IX
Europe	Bulgaria: Sofia	Bulgarian Internet eXchange (BIX)	Euro-IX
Europe	Bulgaria: Sofia	Delta Sofmedya Ltd	Euro-IX
Europe	Bulgaria: Sofia	Global Communication Net Plc.	Euro-IX
Europe	Bulgaria: Sofia	NetIX Communications Ltd. (NetIX)	Euro-IX
Europe	Bulgaria: Sofia	OM-NIX	Euro-IX
Europe	Bulgaria: Sofia	Sofia Connect Ltd. (SofiaConn)	Euro-IX
Europe	Croatia: Zagreb	Croatian Internet Exchange (CIX)	Euro-IX
Europe	Cyprus: Nicosia	Cyprus Internet Exchange (CyIX)	Euro-IX
Europe	Czech Republic: Brno	Brno University of Technology (BRIX)	Euro-IX
Europe	Czech Republic: Prague	Coolhousing s.r.o.	Euro-IX
Europe	Czech Republic: Prague	GRAPE SC, a.s.	Euro-IX
Europe	Czech Republic: Prague	Neutral Internet Exchange of the Czech Republic (NIX.CZ)	Euro-IX
Europe	Czech Republic: Prague	Peering.cz (PCZ)	Euro-IX
Europe	Denmark: Copenhagen	GlobalConnect Content-IX	Euro-IX
Europe	Denmark: Copenhagen	COMIX by Netnod	Euro-IX
Europe	Denmark: Copenhagen	NL-ix (Pan-European distributed Exchange)	Euro-IX
Europe	Denmark: Kongens Lyngby	Danish Internet Exchange Point (DIX)	Euro-IX
Europe	Estonia: Tallinn	Tallinn Governmental Internet Exchange (RTIX)	Euro-IX
Europe	Estonia: Tallinn	Tallinn Internet Exchange (TIX-LAN)	Euro-IX
Europe	Estonia: Tallinn	Tallinn Internet Exchange (2) (TLLIX)	Euro-IX
Europe	Finland: Helsinki, Espoo, Oulu	Finnish Communication and Internet Exchange (FICIX)	Euro-IX
Europe	Finland: Tampere	Tampere Region Exchange (TREX)	Euro-IX
Europe	France: Clermont-Ferrand	AuvernIX	Euro-IX
Europe	France: Grenoble	GrenoblIX	Euro-IX
Europe	France: Lille	Northern France and Eurometropolis GIX (Lillix)	Euro-IX
Europe	France: Lyon	Lyon Internet Exchange (LyonIX)	Euro-IX
Europe	France: Marseille	DE-CIX Marseille	Euro-IX
Europe	France: Marseille	NL-ix (Pan-European distributed Exchange)	Euro-IX
Europe	France: Nice	Nice Internet eXchange (NicIX)	Euro-IX
Europe	France: Normandy	NormandIX	Euro-IX
Europe	France: Paris	Gigabit European Internet Exchange	Euro-IX
Europe	France: Paris	NL-ix (Pan-European distributed Exchange)	Euro-IX
Europe	France: Paris	WIFI eXchange point (WiFIX)	Euro-IX
Europe	France: Paris, Marseille	France Internet Exchange (France-IX)	Euro-IX
Europe	France: Paris	French National Internet Exchange IPv6 (FNIX6)	Euro-IX
Europe	France: Paris	FR-IX	Euro-IX
Europe	France	Lyonix + FR-IX	Euro-IX
Europe	France: Paris	Paris Internet Exchange (PARIX)	Euro-IX
Europe	France: Paris	Paris Operators for Universal Internet Exchange (POUIX)	Euro-IX
Europe	France: Paris	Service for French Internet Exchange (SFINX)	Euro-IX
Europe	France: Paris	StuffIX	Euro-IX
Europe	France: Paris	Equinix Internet Exchange Paris	Euro-IX
Europe	France: Paris	NetIX	Euro-IX
Europe	France: Rhône-Alpes	SainteTiX	Euro-IX
Europe	France: Saint-Trivier-sur-Moignans	Maxnod	Euro-IX
Europe	France: Saint-Étienne	PhibIX Gix & Nap	Euro-IX
Europe	France: Strasbourg	EuroGIX	Euro-IX
Europe	France: Toulouse	Toulouse Internet eXchange (TOUIX)	Euro-IX
Europe	France: Valence	Ardèche and Drôme Internet eXchange (ADN-IX)	Euro-IX
Europe	Germany: Berlin	Berlin Commercial Internet Exchange (BCIX)	Euro-IX
Europe	Germany: Berlin	NL-ix (Pan-European distributed Exchange)	Euro-IX
Europe	Germany: Bremen	Bremen Internet Exchange (BREM-IX)	Euro-IX
Europe	Germany: Frankfurt	Eranium Internet Exchange Frankfurt (ERA-IX)	Euro-IX
Europe	Germany: Frankfurt	NL-ix (Pan-European distributed Exchange)	Euro-IX
Europe	Germany: Frankfurt	Global Internet Exchange and Peering Network (GE-CIX)	Euro-IX
Europe	Germany: Frankfurt	Deutscher Commercial Internet Exchange (DE-CIX)	Euro-IX
Europe	Germany: Hamburg	DE-CIX Hamburg	Euro-IX
Europe	Germany: Munich	DE-CIX Munich	Euro-IX
Europe	Germany: Munich	NL-ix (Pan-European distributed Exchange)	Euro-IX
Europe	Germany: Dortmund	Dortmund Internet eXchange (DO-IX)	Euro-IX
Europe	Germany: Frankfurt, Düsseldorf, Berlin, Hamburg	European Commercial Internet Exchange (ECIX)	Euro-IX
Europe	Germany: Frankfurt	Frankfurt Network Access Point (fraNAP)	Euro-IX
Europe	Germany: Munich	INXS Munich (INXS MUC)	Euro-IX
Europe	Germany: Münster	Nederlands-Duitse Internet Exchange (NDIX)	Euro-IX
Europe	Germany: Frankfurt	Kleyer Rebstöcker InternetExchange (KleyReX)	Euro-IX
Europe	Germany: Nuremberg	Nürnberger Internet Exchange (N-IX)	Euro-IX
Europe	Germany: Frankfurt	NetIX	Euro-IX
Europe	Germany: Düsseldorf, Frankfurt	OpenCarrier eG Member IX (OCIX Duesseldorf/OCIX Frankfurt)	Euro-IX
Europe	Germany: Stuttgart	Stuttgarter Internet eXchange (S-IX)	Euro-IX
Europe	Germany: Frankfurt	Akaere Internet Exchange Point (AKIX)	
Europe	Greece: Athens	Greek Internet Exchange (GR-IX)	Euro-IX
Europe	Hungary: Budapest	Budapest Internet Exchange (BIX)	Euro-IX
Europe	Iceland: Reykjavík	Reykjavík Internet Exchange (RIX)	Euro-IX
Europe	Ireland: Cork	Cork Neutral Internet Exchange (CNIX)	Euro-IX
Europe	Ireland: Dublin	Internet Neutral Exchange Association Ltd. (INEX)	Euro-IX
Europe	Ireland: Dublin	NL-ix (Pan-European distributed Exchange)	Euro-IX
Europe	Italy: Florence	Tuscany Internet Exchange (TIX)	Euro-IX
Europe	Italy: Milan	Milan Internet eXchange (MIX)	Euro-IX
Europe	Italy: Milan	Milan Neutral Access Point (MINAP)	Euro-IX
Europe	Italy: Palermo	DE-CIX Palermo	Euro-IX
Europe	Italy: Padova	VSIX Nap del Nord Est	Euro-IX
Europe	Italy: Rome	Nautilus Mediterranean eXchange point (NaMeX)	Euro-IX
Europe	Italy: Turin	Torino-Piemonte Exchange Point (TOPIX)	Euro-IX
Europe	Italy: Udine	Friuli Venezia Giulia Internet Exchange (FVG-IX)	Euro-IX
Europe	Kosovo: Pristina	Kosova Internet Exchange (KOSIX)	Euro-IX
Europe	Latvia: Riga	Latvian Internet Exchange (LIX)	Euro-IX
Europe	Latvia: Riga	Santa Monica Internet Local Exchange (SMILE-IXP)	Euro-IX
Europe	Lithuania: Vilnius	Lithuanian Baltneta Internet Exchange, Didžiausias Lietuviško interneto apsikeitimo taškas (BALT-IX)	Euro-IX
Europe	Lithuania: Vilnius	Lithuanian Internet Exchange, Lietuvos Interneto (LIPTAM)	Euro-IX
Europe	Lithuania: Vilnius	Lithuanian Internet eXchange Point, Lietuvos Interneto apsikeitimo taskas (LIXP)	Euro-IX
Europe	Lithuania: Vilnius	New Lithuanian Internet Exchange, Naujas Lietuviško interneto apsikeitimo taškas (LITIX)	Euro-IX
Europe	Luxembourg: Luxembourg	LU-CIX (LUxembourg Commercial Internet eXchange; merged with Luxemburg Internet Exchange (LIX))	Euro-IX
Europe	Luxembourg: Luxembourg	NL-ix (Pan-European distributed Exchange)	Euro-IX
Europe	Malta: Msida	Malta Internet Exchange (MIX Malta)	Euro-IX
Europe	Moldova: Chișinău	Moldavian Internet Exchange (MD-IX)	Euro-IX
Europe	Netherlands: Amsterdam	Global Network Management (GNM-IX)	Euro-IX
Europe	Netherlands: Amsterdam	Amsterdam Internet Exchange (AMS-IX)	Euro-IX
Europe	Netherlands: Amsterdam	Global Internet Exchange and Peering Network (GE-CIX)	Euro-IX
Europe	Netherlands: Amsterdam	Eranium Internet Exchange (ERA-IX)	Euro-IX
Europe	Netherlands: Amsterdam	Frysian Internet Exchange (Frys-ix)	Euro-IX
Europe	Netherlands: Amsterdam	NL-ix (Pan-European distributed Exchange)	Euro-IX
Europe	Netherlands: Dronten	Speed Internet Exchange (Speed-IX)	Euro-IX
Europe	Netherlands: Enschede	Nederlands-Duitse Internet Exchange (NDIX)	Euro-IX
Europe	Netherlands: Amsterdam	XchangePoint Amsterdam IPP	Euro-IX
Europe	Netherlands: Rotterdam	Rotterdam Internet eXchange (R-iX)	Euro-IX
Europe	Netherlands: Amsterdam	NetIX	Euro-IX
Europe	Netherlands: Amsterdam	North Sea Internet Exchange (NSIX)	Euro-IX
Europe	Norway: Oslo, Bergen, Stavanger, Trondheim	Norwegian Internet Exchange (NIX-NO)	Euro-IX
Europe	Norway: Oslo	Free Internet eXchange Oslo (FIXO)	Euro-IX
Europe	Poland: Gdańsk	Gdańsk Internet eXchange	Euro-IX
Europe	Poland: Katowice, Silesia	Stowarzyszenie na Rzecz Rozwoju Spoleczenstwa Informacyjnego e-Poludnie (EPIX)	Euro-IX
Europe	Poland: Mogilno	Central Polish Internet eXchange (CPIX-PL)	Euro-IX
Europe	Poland: Kraków	Cracow Internet Exchange (CIX)	Euro-IX
Europe	Poland: Warsaw	Global Internet Exchange and Peering Network (GE-CIX)	Euro-IX
Europe	Poland: Warsaw	Krajowa Izba Komunikacji Ethernetowej (KIX)	Euro-IX
Europe	Poland: Warsaw	Polish Internet Exchange (PLIX)	Euro-IX
Europe	Poland: Warsaw	Thinx Poland (THINX)	Euro-IX
Europe	Poland: Warsaw	Warsaw Internet Exchange (WIX)	Euro-IX
Europe	Poland: Warsaw	Telekomunikacja Polska Internet Exchange (TPIX)	Euro-IX
Europe	Poland: Poznań	Poznań Internet eXchange (POZIX)	Euro-IX
Europe	Portugal: Lisbon, Porto	GIGAbit Portuguese Internet Exchange (GIGAPIX)	Euro-IX
Europe	Portugal: Lisbon	Lisbon Internet Exchange (LIS-IX)	
Europe	Romania: Bucharest	Balcan-IX (Balcan-IX)	Euro-IX
Europe	Romania: Bucharest	Romanian Network for Internet Exchange (RoNIX)	Euro-IX
Europe	Romania: Bucharest	InterLAN Internet Exchange (InterLAN)	Euro-IX
Europe	Romania: Constanța	Tomis Internet eXchange (TomIX)	Euro-IX
Europe	Romania: Bucharest	NetIX	Euro-IX
Europe	Romania: Bucharest	DreamServer Internet Exchange (DSIX)	Euro-IX
Europe	Russia: Krasnodar	South Russia IX (Sea-IX)	Euro-IX
Europe	Russia: Nizhny Novgorod	Nizhny Novgorod Internet Exchange (NNOV-IX)	Euro-IX
Europe	Russia: Saratov	Saratov Internet Exchange (Saratov-IX)	Euro-IX
Europe	Russia: Rostov-on-Don	LTD Irida telecom	Euro-IX
Europe	Russia: Rostov-on-Don	Rostov-on-Don IX	Euro-IX
Europe	Russia: Moscow	Eurasia Peering	Euro-IX
Europe	Russia: Moscow	Global Internet Exchange and Peering Network (GE-CIX)	Euro-IX
Europe	Russia: Moscow	SVAO-IX	Euro-IX
Europe	Russia: Moscow	Home Networks eXchange (NET-IX)	Euro-IX
Europe	Russia: Moscow	Home-IX	Euro-IX
Europe	Russia: Moscow	ROILCOM Ltd	Euro-IX
Europe	Russia: Saint Petersburg	Global Internet Exchange and Peering Network (GE-CIX)	Euro-IX
Europe	Russia: Saint Petersburg	PIRIX	Euro-IX
Europe	Russia: Moscow	MediaSoft Expert	Euro-IX
Europe	Russia: Moscow	Moscow Internet Exchange (MSK-IX)	Euro-IX
Europe	Russia: Saint Petersburg	North-West Internet Exchange (NW-IX)	Euro-IX
Europe	Russia: Saint Petersburg	Westcom	Euro-IX
Europe	Russia: Saint Petersburg	MSK-IX Saint-Petersburg (formerly Saint Petersburg Internet Exchange (SPB-IX))	Euro-IX
Europe	Russia: Samara	Samara IX	Euro-IX
Europe	Russia: Ulyanovsk	Ulyanovsk Internet eXchange (ULN-IX)	Euro-IX
Europe	Russia: Yaroslavl	Yaroslavl Internet Exchange	Euro-IX
Europe	Serbia: Belgrade	Serbian Open eXchange (SOX)	Euro-IX
Europe	Slovakia: Bratislava	Neutral Internet eXchange Slovakia (SIX.SK)	Euro-IX
Europe	Slovakia: Bratislava, Košice	Slovak Internet eXchange (SIX)	Euro-IX
Europe	Slovenia: Ljubljana	Slovenian Internet Exchange (SIX)	Euro-IX
Europe	Spain: Barcelona	Catalunya Neutral Internet Exchange (CATNIX)	Euro-IX
Europe	Spain: Madrid	Nap de las Americas, Verizon Enterprise Solutions	Euro-IX
Europe	Spain: Madrid	España Internet Exchange (ESPANIX)	Euro-IX
Europe	Sweden: Borås	BOR-IX	Euro-IX
Europe	Sweden: Malmö	COMIX	Euro-IX
Europe	Sweden: Malmö	Internet eXchange point of the Oresund Region (IXOR/MalmIX)	Euro-IX
Europe	Sweden: Stockholm, Gothenburg, Malmö, Sundsvall, Luleå	Netnod Internet Exchange i Sverige (Netnod)	Euro-IX
Europe	Sweden: Gothenburg	Gothenburg Internet Exchange (GIX)	Euro-IX
Europe	Sweden: Stockholm	Stockholm Open Local Internet Exchange (SOL-IX)	Euro-IX
Europe	Sweden: Stockholm, Gothenburg	Stockholm Internet eXchange (STHIX)	Euro-IX
Europe	Sweden: Stockholm, Gothenburg, Malmö	Sweden Open Network Internet eXchange (SONIX)	Euro-IX
Europe	Sweden: Umeå	NorrNod	Euro-IX
Europe	Sweden: Uppsala	Uppsala regional Internet exchange (UPPrix)	Euro-IX
Europe	Switzerland: Geneva	CERN Internet Exchange Point (CIXP)	Euro-IX
Europe	Switzerland: Zürich	Equinix Zürich	Euro-IX
Europe	Switzerland: Zürich, Bern, Basel, Lupfig	Swiss Internet Exchange (SwissIX)	Euro-IX
Europe	Turkey: Istanbul	CityNet Telekom	Euro-IX
Europe	Turkey: Istanbul	DE-CIX Istanbul (formerly Istanbul Internet Exchange (IST-IX))	Euro-IX
Europe	Turkey: Istanbul	IST-IX.NET new Istanbul Internet Exchange	Euro-IX
Europe	Ukraine: Dnipro	Fregat	Euro-IX
Europe	Ukraine: Donetsk	Donetsk Internet Exchange Point (DN-IX/EUNIC-IX)	Euro-IX
Europe	Ukraine: Kharkiv	Kharkiv Internet Exchange (KH-IX)	Euro-IX
Europe	Ukraine: Kherson	Kherson Internet Exchange (IX.ks.ua)	Euro-IX
Europe	Ukraine: Kyiv	Global Internet Exchange and Peering Network (GE-CIX)	Euro-IX
Europe	Ukraine: Kyiv	Ukrainian Internet Exchange Network (UA-IX)	Euro-IX
Europe	Ukraine: Kyiv	Digital Telecom Internet Exchange (DTEL-IX)	Euro-IX
Europe	Ukraine: Lviv	Lviv Internet Exchange Point	Euro-IX
Europe	Ukraine: Odesa	Odesa Internet Exchange (OD-IX)	Euro-IX
Europe	Ukraine: Simferopol	Crimea-IX	Euro-IX
Europe	Ukraine: Zaporizhia	Zaporizhia Internet Exchange (ZPIX)	Euro-IX
Europe	United Kingdom: Bradford	Bradford Internet Exchange (IXBradford)	Euro-IX
Europe	United Kingdom: Brighton	Brighton Digital eXchange (BDX)	Euro-IX
Europe	United Kingdom: Newport	LINX Wales operated by London Internet Exchange	Euro-IX
Europe	United Kingdom: Edinburgh	IXScotland operated by London Internet Exchange	Euro-IX
Europe	United Kingdom: Leeds	Leeds Internet Exchange (IXLeeds)	Euro-IX
Europe	United Kingdom: Liverpool	IX Liverpool	Euro-IX
Europe	United Kingdom: London	London Internet Exchange (LINX)	Euro-IX
Europe	United Kingdom: London	London Network Access Point (LONAP)	Euro-IX
Europe	United Kingdom: London	NL-ix (Pan-European distributed Exchange)	Euro-IX
Europe	United Kingdom: London	NetIX	Euro-IX
Europe	United Kingdom: London	RapidIX	Euro-IX
Europe	United Kingdom: Manchester	IX Manchester operated by London Internet Exchange	Euro-IX

=== Latin America ===
Region	Country: City/Region	Name	IX-F region
Latin America	Argentina: Bahía Blanca, Buenos Aires, Córdoba, Mar del Tuyú, La Plata, Mendoza, Neuquén, Rosario, Santa Fe	IXP Argentina Group, CABASE	LAC-IX
Latin America	Belize: Belize City	Belize Internet Exchange Point (BIXP)	LAC-IX
Latin America	Bolivia: La Paz	IXP-MEGALINK	LAC-IX
Latin America	Bolivia: Santa Cruz de la Sierra	IXP-Confiared	LAC-IX
Latin America	Brazil: Aracaju, Belém, Belo Horizonte, Boa Vista, Brasília, Campina Grande, Campinas, Campo Grande, Caruaru, Cascavel, Caxias do Sul, Cuiabá, Curitiba, Feira de Santana, Florianópolis, Fortaleza, Foz do Iguaçu, Goiânia, João Pessoa, Lajeado, Londrina, Maceió, Manaus, Maringá, Natal, Palmas, Porto Alegre, Porto Velho, Recife, Rio Branco, Rio de Janeiro, Salvador, Santa Maria, São José dos Campos, São José do Rio Preto, São Luis, São Paulo, Teresina, Vitória	PTT Metro	LAC-IX
Latin America	Brazil: Rio de Janeiro	PTT Moebius	LAC-IX
Latin America	Brazil: Rio de Janeiro	PIX LINKFULL	LAC-IX
Latin America	Brazil: São Paulo	NAP do Brasil, Equinix	LAC-IX
Latin America	Brazil: Rio de Janeiro	Equinix Rio de Janeiro	LAC-IX
Latin America	Brazil: São Paulo	Equinix São Paulo	LAC-IX
Latin America	Chile: Santiago	NAP Chile, Intercambio de Tráfico Nacional	LAC-IX
Latin America	Chile: Santiago	PIT Chile, Intercambio de Tráfico Nacional y CDN's	LAC-IX
Latin America	Chile: Punta Arenas	PatagoniaIX, Intercambio de tráfico neutral en Magallanes	LAC-IX
Latin America	Colombia: Bogotá	PIT Colombia – Bogotá	LAC-IX
Latin America	Colombia: Medellín	PIT Colombia – Medellín	LAC-IX
Latin America	Colombia: Cali	PIT Colombia – Cali	LAC-IX
Latin America	Colombia: Barranquilla	PIT Colombia – Barranquilla	LAC-IX
Latin America	Colombia: Bogotá	NAP Colombia (CCIT)	LAC-IX
Latin America	Curaçao: Willemstad	AMS-IX Caribbean	LAC-IX
Latin America	Costa Rica: San José	Costa Rica Internet Exchange (CRIX)	LAC-IX
Latin America	Costa Rica: San José	IXP INFOCOM Costa Rica	LAC-IX
Latin America	Costa Rica: Alajuela	IXP Instituto Costarricense de Electricidad (ICE)	LAC-IX
Latin America	Costa Rica: San José	IXP Navégalo	LAC-IX
Latin America	Costa Rica: San José	Tigo Costa Rica, Amnet Cable Costa Rica	LAC-IX
Latin America	Dominica: Roseau	Dominica National Internet Exchange Point (DANIX)	LAC-IX
Latin America	Dominican Republic: Santo Domingo	NAP del Caribe	LAC-IX
Latin America	Dominican Republic: Santo Domingo	Tricom S.A.	LAC-IX
Latin America	Ecuador: Quito	PIT Ecuador – Quito	LAC-IX
Latin America	Ecuador: Guayaquil	PIT Ecuador – Guayaquil	LAC-IX
Latin America	Ecuador: Quito, Guayaquil	NAP Ecudador (NAP.EC-UIO/NAP.EC-GYE)	LAC-IX
Latin America	Grenada: St. George's	Grenada Internet Exchange (GREX)	LAC-IX
Latin America	Guatemala: Guatemala City	PIT Guatemala (PIT – Ciudad de Guatemala)	LAC-IX
Latin America	Haiti: Port-au-Prince	Haiti Internet Exchange (HIX)	LAC-IX
Latin America	Honduras: Tegucigalpa	IXP-HN	LAC-IX
Latin America	Martinique: Fort-de-France	Martinique Internet Exchange (MARTIN-IX)	LAC-IX
Latin America	Mexico: Tijuana	Mexico Internet Exchange (MIE) www.mie.mx	LAC-IX
Latin America	Mexico: Mexicali	Mexico Internet Exchange (MIE) www.mie.mx	LAC-IX
Latin America	Mexico: Ciudad Juarez	Mexico Internet Exchange (MIE) www.mie.mx	LAC-IX
Latin America	Mexico: Mexico City	IXP Mexicano	LAC-IX
Latin America	Peru: Lima	Perú IX – Lima (formerly PIT Peru)	LAC-IX
Latin America	Peru: Arequipa	Perú IX – Arequipa (formerly PIT Peru)	LAC-IX
Latin America	Peru: Trujillo	Perú IX – Trujillo (formerly PIT Peru)	LAC-IX
Latin America	Peru: Chiclayo	Perú IX – Chiclayo (formerly PIT Peru)	LAC-IX
Latin America	Peru: Cuzco	Perú IX – Cuzco (formerly PIT Peru)	LAC-IX
Latin America	Peru: Huancayo	Perú IX – Huancayo (formerly PIT Peru)	LAC-IX
Latin America	Peru: Piura	Perú IX – Piura (formerly PIT Peru)	LAC-IX
Latin America	Peru: Lima	Nap Peru	LAC-IX
Latin America	United States: San Juan, PR	Claro Puerto Rico	LAC-IX
Latin America	United States: San Juan, PR	Internet Exchange of Puerto Rico, ix.pr	LAC-IX
Latin America	United States: San Juan, PR	Puerto Rico Bridge Initiative (PRBI-IX), Critical Hub Networks	LAC-IX
Latin America	Panama: Panama	InterRed *	LAC-IX
Latin America	Paraguay: Asunción	IX.PY *	LAC-IX
Latin America	Paraguay: Ciudad del Este	IX CDE *	LAC-IX
Latin America	Paraguay: Ciudad del Este	PIT Paraguay *	LAC-IX
Latin America	Saint-Barthélemy: Saint-Barthélemy	Saint Barth Internet Exchange (SBH-IX)	LAC-IX
Latin America	Saint Kitts: Basseterre	St. Kitts & Nevis Internet Exchange (SKN-IX)	LAC-IX
Latin America	Saint Martin: Marigot	Saint Martin Internet Exchange (SMART-IX)	LAC-IX
Latin America	Sint Maarten: Philipsburg	Open Caribbean Internet Exchange (OCIX)	LAC-IX
Latin America	Trinidad and Tobago: Barataria	Trinidad and Tobago Internet Exchange (TTIX)	LAC-IX
Latin America	Venezuela: Caracas	Venezuela IX (www.venezuelaix.net)	LAC-IX

=== Middle East ===
Region	Country: City/Region	Name	IX-F region
Middle East	Iran: Tehran	Tehran Internet Exchange-SC2	NIX (National intranet exchange)
Middle East	Iran: Tehran	Tehran Internet Exchange-SC1	NIX
Middle East	Iran: Bumahen	Tehran Internet Exchange-Bomehen	NIX
Middle East	Iran: Isfahan	Tehran Internet Exchange-Isfahan-SC2	NIX
Middle East	Iran: Mashhad	Tehran Internet Exchange-Mashhad-SC2	NIX
Middle East	Iran: Shiraz	Tehran Internet Exchange-Shiraz-SC2	NIX
Middle East	Iran: Tabriz	Tehran Internet Exchange-Tabriz-SC2	NIX
Middle East	Iraq: Baghdad	MASARAT telecom (GCCIT)	Euro-IX
Middle East	Israel: Petach Tikva	Israeli Internet Exchange (IIX)	Euro-IX
Middle East	Egypt: Cairo	Cairo Internet Exchange (CAIX)	Euro-IX
Middle East	Egypt: Cairo	Middle East Internet Exchange (MEIX, GPX Cairo)	Euro-IX
Middle East	Lebanon: Beirut	Advanced IX	Euro-IX
Middle East	Lebanon: Beirut	Beirut Internet Exchange (BIX) *	Euro-IX
Middle East	Lebanon: Beirut	Pros-Services	Euro-IX
Middle East	Palestine: Gaza	Digital Communication ltd.	Euro-IX
Middle East	Palestine: Ramallah	Palestine Internet Exchange Point (PIX)	Euro-IX
Middle East	Saudi Arabia: Riyadh	Saudi Arabian Internet Exchange (SAIX)	tbd
Middle East	United Arab Emirates: Dubai	UAE Internet Exchange (UAE-IX)	Euro-IX
Middle East	United Arab Emirates: Fujairah	Etisalat Smarthub IPX, SH-IX	Euro-IX

=== North America ===
Region	Country: City/Region	Name	IX-F region
North America	Canada: Calgary	Calgary Internet Exchange (YYCIX)	
North America	Canada: Edmonton	Edmonton Internet Exchange (YEGIX)	
North America	Canada: Halifax	Halifax Internet Exchange (HFXIX)	
North America	Canada: Saskatoon	Saskatoon Internet Exchange (YXEIX)	
North America	Canada: Toronto	Greater Toronto International Internet Exchange (GTIIX)	
North America	Canada: Toronto	Equinix Internet Exchange	
North America	Canada: Ottawa	Ottawa-Gatineau Internet Exchange (OGIX)	
North America	Canada: Vancouver, Toronto, Montreal	Peer1 Exchange (PIX)	
North America	Canada: Montreal	Montreal Internet Exchange (QIX)	
North America	Canada: Toronto	Ontario Internet Exchange (ONIX)	
North America	Canada: Toronto	Toronto Internet Exchange (TorIX)	
North America	Canada: Vancouver	Vancouver Internet Exchange (VANIX)	
North America	Canada: Vancouver	BCNET Vancouver Transit Exchange	
North America	Canada: Winnipeg	Manitoba Internet Exchange (MBIX)	
North America	Canada: Winnipeg	Winnipeg Internet Exchange (WPGIX)	
North America	United States: Kansas City, Missouri	F4 Internet Exchange(F4IX)	
North America	United States: Paducah, Kentucky	Paducah Internet Exchange (Paducah IX, PIE)	
North America	United States: Baltimore, Baltimore, Maryland	DACS-IX Baltimore	
North America	United States: Orlando, Orlando, Florida	DACS-IX Orlando	
North America	United States: Fremont	FCIX	
North America	United States: Fremont	Lambda Internet Exchange	
North America	United States: Fremont	FREMIX	
North America	United States: Fremont with global presence	EVIX	
North America	United States: Ashland	Richmond Virginia Internet Exchange (RVA-IX)	
North America	United States: Chicago, Illinois	United IX – Chicago (ChIX)	
North America	United States: Chicago, Illinois	AMS-IX Chicago	
North America	United States: Evansville	SITCO Evansville-IN	
North America	United States: Jacksonville	Jacksonville Internet Exchange (JXIX)	
North America	United States: Kansas City, Missouri	Kansas City Internet eXchange (KCIX)	
North America	United States: Austin, Dallas, Houston, Phoenix, San Antonio	CyrusOne Internet Exchange (CyrusOne IX)	
North America	United States: Madison	Madison Internet Exchange (MadIX)	
North America	United States: Moffett Field	NGIX West	
North America	United States: Mountain View	NASA Ames Internet eXchange	
North America	United States: Nashville	Nashville Internet Exchange (NashIX)	
North America	United States: Albuquerque	ABQIX	
North America	United States: Northern Virginia	LINX Northern Virginia (LINX NoVa)	
North America	United States: Ohio	OhioIX	
North America	United States: Boston, Los Angeles, Chicago, Denver, Miami, New York City, Reston, San Jose	Any2	
North America	United States: Phoenix	ArizonaIX, i/o Datacenter	
North America	United States: Atlanta, Dallas, New York City, Phoenix	Digital Realty Internet Exchange	tbd
North America	United States: Atlanta	Southeast Network Access Point (SNAP)	tbd
North America	United States: New York City, New York,	Big Apple Peering Exchange (Big APE)	tbd
North America	United States: New York City, New York	AMS-IX New York	tbd
North America	United States: Buffalo, New York	Buffalo Niagara International Internet Exchange (BNIIX)	tbd
North America	United States: Boston	Massachusetts eXchange Point (MXP)	tbd
North America	United States: Boston	Markley Boston Internet Exchange (BOSIX)	tbd
North America	United States: Southfield, Michigan	Detroit Internet Exchange DET-IX	tbd
North America	United States: Duluth	Twin Ports Internet Exchange	tbd
North America	United States: Edison, NJ; New York City; Newark, NJ; Piscataway, NJ; Secaucus, NJ; Wall Township, NJ; Westbury, NY	DE-CIX New York	tbd
North America	United States: New York City	Free NYIIX Alternative (NYCX)	tbd
North America	United States: Tulsa	LiveAir Tulsa IX	tbd
North America	United States: Atlanta, Chicago metro (Chicago and Elk Grove Village), Dallas Metroplex (Dallas and Plano), Denver metro (Englewood and Denver), Houston, Los Angeles metro (Los Angeles and El Segundo), Miami metro (Miami and Boca Raton), New York metro (Newark, NJ; Secaucus, NJ; North Bergen, NJ; and New York City), Seattle metro (Seattle and Kent), Silicon Valley (San Jose, Sunnyvale, Palo Alto and Santa Clara), Washington D.C. metro (Culpeper, VA; and Ashburn, VA)	Equinix Internet Exchange	tbd
North America	United States: Chicago, 350 East Cermak Road	Greater Chicago International Internet Exchange (GCIIX)	tbd
North America	United States: Los Angeles, Seattle	Pacific Wave Exchange (PacificWave)	tbd
North America	United States: Los Angeles	Los Angeles International Internet eXchange (LAIIX)	tbd
North America	United States: Redding	Jefferson State Access Exchange(JSAX)	tbd
North America	United States: Los Angeles	CENIC International Internet eXchange (CIIX), formerly known as the Los Angeles Access Point (LAAP))	tbd
North America	United States: Dallas, Chicago, New York City, San Jose, Los Angeles	MAE-Central/MAE-East/MAE-West	tbd
North America	United States: Indianapolis	FD-IX / MidWest Internet Exchange	tbd
North America	United States: McAllen, Texas	MEX-IX McAllen	tbd
North America	United States: Minneapolis, Minnesota, 511 Building	Midwest Internet Cooperative Exchange (MICE)	tbd
North America	United States: Minneapolis, Minnesota	Northern Lights Local Exchange Point (NLLXP)	tbd
North America	United States: Milwaukee	The Milwaukee IX (MKE-IX)	tbd
North America	United States: Omaha	Omaha Internet Exchange (OmahaIX)	tbd
North America	United States: Bend, Oregon	Central Oregon Internet eXchange	tbd
North America	United States: Portland, Oregon	Oregon-IX (OIX)	tbd
North America	United States: Portland, Oregon, Helena, Missoula	Northwest Access Exchange, Inc., NWAX	tbd
North America	United States: New York (New York City; Newark NJ; Secaucus, NJ), Los Angeles, Philadelphia	New York International Internet eXchange (NYIIX)	tbd
North America	United States: Ashburn, VA; Atlanta; Chicago; Dallas; Denver; El Segundo, CA; Miami; Los Angeles; New York City; Newark, NJ; Palo Alto, CA; San Jose, CA; Santa Clara, CA; Secaucus, NJ; Seattle; St. Louis; Sunnyvale, CA; Wall Township, NJ; Westbury, NY	NetIX	tbd
North America	United States: Phoenix	AZIX	tbd
North America	United States: Phoenix	Ninja-IX Phoenix (formerly Phoenix-IX)	tbd
North America	United States: Phoenix	Phoenix Internet Exchange, LLC	tbd
North America	United States: Baltimore	The Baltimore Internet Exchange (BaltIX)	tbd
North America	United States: Philadelphia	Philadelphia Internet Exchange (PhillyIX)	tbd
North America	United States: Pittsburgh	Pittsburgh Internet Exchange (PIT-IX)	tbd
North America	United States: Reno	Tahoe Internet Exchange (TahoeIX)	tbd
North America	United States: San Diego	San Diego NAP (SD-NAP)	tbd
North America	United States: San Francisco	San Francisco Internet Exchange (SFIX)	tbd
North America	United States: Fremont, San Francisco, San Jose, Santa Clara	SFMIX	tbd
North America	United States: Fremont	ARIX	tbd
North America	United States: San Francisco, San Jose	AMS-IX Bay Area	tbd
North America	United States: San Francisco, San Jose	KDWEB Exchange	tbd
North America	United States: Salt Lake City	Salt Lake Internet Exchange (SLIX)	tbd
North America	United States: Seattle	Seattle Internet Exchange (SIX)	tbd
North America	United States: Tampa	Tampa Internet Exchange (TPAIX)	tbd
North America	United States: Tampa	Tampa Internet Exchange (TampaIX)	tbd
North America	United States: Texas	Playnet	tbd
North America	United States: Medford, Oregon	Southern Oregon Access Exchange (SOAX)	tbd
North America	United States: St. George, Utah	Southern Utah Peering Regional Network (SUPRnet)	tbd
North America	United States: Atlanta, Dallas, Miami, New York City, Palo Alto, San Jose, Seattle, Vienna, Virginia	Palo Alto Internet eXchange (PAIX), dissolved to become a part of Equinix Internet Exchange.	tbd
North America	United States: Miami, Boca Raton, Fort Lauderdale	The Florida Internet Exchange, (FL-IX)	tbd
North America	United States: Utah	Utah Telecommunication Open Infrastructure Agency (UTOPIA)	tbd
North America	United States: Billings	Yellowstone Regional Internet eXchange (YRIX)	tbd
North America	United States: Miami, Florida	Miami Internet Exchange	tbd
North America	United States: Miami, Florida	AMPATH – Florida International University/CIARA	tbd
North America	United States	BigHorn Fiber Internet Exchange	tbd
North America	United States: Houston, Kansas City, Philadelphia, St. Louis, Chicago	Netrality Internet Exchange Points	TBD

=== Oceania ===
Region	Country: City/Region	Name	IX-F region
Oceania	Australia: Canberra	TransACT IX	APIX
Oceania	Australia: Sydney, Melbourne	Equinix Australia	APIX
Oceania	Australia: Canberra, Sydney, Brisbane, Adelaide, Melbourne, Perth	IX Australia	APIX
Oceania	Australia: Sydney, Brisbane, Melbourne	Megaport-IX	APIX
Oceania	Australia: Sydney	Pacific IX	APIX
Oceania	Australia: Brisbane, Sydney, Melbourne, Adelaide, Hobart, Canberra	PIPE Networks	APIX
Oceania	Australia: Melbourne	AUSIX	APIX
Oceania	Australia: Perth	Western Australian Internet Exchange (WAIX)	APIX
Oceania	Australia: Tasmania	Tasmanian Internet Exchange (TAS-IX)	APIX
Oceania	New Zealand: Auckland	Auckland Internet Exchange (AKL-IX)	APIX
Oceania	New Zealand: Auckland	Megaport-IX	APIX
Oceania	New Zealand: Auckland, Hamilton, Palmerston North, Wellington, Christchurch	New Zealand Internet Exchange Point (NZIX) ExchangeNET	APIX
Oceania	Vanuatu: Port Vila	Vanuatu Internet Exchange	APIX

== Inactive internet exchanges ==
The IXPs in the list that follows do not have a working webpage or a record in the PeeringDB.

Region	Country: City/Region	Name	IX-F region
Africa	Ivory Coast: Abidjan	Ivory Coast Internet Exchange (CIIXP) *	Af-IX
Africa	Kenya: Mombasa	AMS-IX East Africa Exchange Point *	
Africa	Tanzania: Zanzibar	ZIXP – Zanzibar internet Exchange Point, www.zixp.or.tz *	
Asia	China: Shanghai	Shanghai City Exchange *	APIX
Asia	China: Shanghai	Shanghai Internet Exchange Center *	APIX
Asia	China: Shanghai	TerraMark *	APIX
Asia	Indonesia: Jakarta	Napsindo International Internet Exchange (NAIIX) *	APIX
Asia	Malaysia: Kuala Lumpur	Asia Internet Exchange Network Access Point Malaysia (ARIX) *	APIX
Asia	Malaysia: Kuala Lumpur	Kuala Lumpur Internet Exchange *	APIX
Asia	Sri Lanka	Sri Lanka Internet Exchange (SLIX) *	APIX
Asia	Taiwan: Taipei	Taiwan Network Access Point (TWNAP) *	APIX
Asia	Thailand: Bangkok	NECTEC IIR Public Internet Exchange (NECTEC-PIE, research only) *	APIX
Asia	Vietnam: Hanoi	EVNTelecom is now Viettel	APIX
Europe	Bulgaria: Varna	Varna Internet Exchange	Euro-IX
Europe	France: Grenoble	Grenoble Network Initiative (GNI)	Euro-IX
Europe	France: Marseille	Marseille Internet eXchange (MAIX)	Euro-IX
Europe	France: Paris	Metropolitan Area Ethernet (MAE)	Euro-IX
Europe	France: Paris	Mix Internet Exchange and Transit (MIXT)	Euro-IX
Europe	Germany: Frankfurt	Frankfurt Internet Exchange (F-IX)	Euro-IX
Europe	Netherlands: Leeuwarden	Friese Internet Exchange (FR-IX) *	Euro-IX
Europe	Netherlands: The Hague	Den Haag Internet Exchange *	Euro-IX
Europe	Spain: Santiago de Compostela	Galicia Neutral Internet Exchange (GALNIX)	Euro-IX
Europe	Spain: Leioa, Basque Country	Basque Country Internet Exchange Point, Punto Neutro Vasco (EuskoNIX)	Euro-IX
Europe	Turkey: Istanbul	Turkish Information Exchange (TURNET)	Euro-IX
Europe	Austria: Salzburg	Salzburg Internet Exchange (SAINEX) *	Euro-IX
Europe	Denmark: Copenhagen	Copenhagen Internet eXchange (COPHIX, became COMIX by Netnod)	Euro-IX
Europe	Greece: Athens	Athens Internet Exchange (AIX, replaced by the Greek Internet Exchange in 2010) *	Euro-IX
Europe	Germany: Frankfurt	MAE Frankfurt	Euro-IX
Europe	Germany: Hamburg	INXS Hamburg (INXS HBG) *	Euro-IX
Europe	Spain: Madrid	Madrid Internet Exchange (MAD-IX)	Euro-IX
Europe	Switzerland: Zurich	Telehouse Internet Exchange (TIX, now operated as Equinix Zurich)	Euro-IX
Europe	United Kingdom	Edge-IX	Euro-IX
Europe	United Kingdom: Ipswich	BTexact Technologies IPv6 (UK6X)	Euro-IX
Europe	United Kingdom: Edinburgh	UNION IXP – The member owned co-location facility in central Scotland	Euro-IX
Europe	United Kingdom: London	Meridian Gate Internet Exchange (MERIEX)	Euro-IX
Europe	United Kingdom: London	Packet Exchange	Euro-IX
Europe	United Kingdom: Manchester	Manchester Commercial Internet Exchange (mcix)	Euro-IX
Europe	United Kingdom: Manchester	Manchester Network Access Point (MaNAP)	Euro-IX
Europe	United Kingdom: Manchester	Enlightened Internet Exchange	Euro-IX
Europe	United Kingdom: London	xChangepoint (acquired by Packet Exchange)	Euro-IX
Europe	United Kingdom: London	London Internet Providers Exchange (LIPEX) *	Euro-IX
Europe	United Kingdom: London	Redbus Internet Exchange (RBIEX) *	Euro-IX
Europe	United Kingdom: London	Sovereign House Exchange (SovEx) *	Euro-IX
Europe	Poland: Stargard	S3 IXP	Euro-IX
Europe	Russia: Chelyabinsk	Chelyabinsk Peering Point Ural (created ~2001, stalled ~2004)	Euro-IX
Middle East	Egypt: Cairo	Cairo Regional Internet Exchange (CRIX) *	Euro-IX
North America	Canada: Niagara Region	Niagara Region International Internet Exchange (NRIIX)	
North America	Canada: Ottawa	Ottawa Federal GigaPOP	
North America	Canada: Ottawa	Ottawa Internet Exchange (OttIX)	
North America	United States: Chicago, Illinois	AADS IXP, AT&T, NAP	tbd
North America	United States: San Luis Obispo, California	California Central Coast Internet Exchange (C3IX)	tbd
North America	United States: Chicago, 350 East Cermak Road	Chicago Internet eXchange (ChIX)	tbd
North America	United States: Philadelphia	Philadelphia Internet Exchange (PHLIX)	tbd
North America	United States: Philadelphia	Philadelphia Internet Exchange (PHILAIX)	tbd
North America	United States United States	Voice Peering Fabric, distributed IXP for the exchange of VoIP traffic	tbd
Oceania	Australia: Canberra	ACT Internet Exchange (ACTIX, now belongs to IX Australia)	APIX
Oceania	Australia: Lismore	Lismore Internet Exchange (LIX)	APIX
Oceania	Australia: Victoria	Victorian Internet Exchange (VIX)	APIX
Oceania	Australia: Brisbane	Brisbane Internet Exchange (BIX) *	APIX
Oceania	Australia: Melbourne	MEL BONE *	APIX
Oceania	Australia: Melbourne	Melbourne NAPette *	APIX
Oceania	Australia: Newcastle	Newcastle Internet Exchange (NIX) *	APIX
Oceania	Australia: Adelaide	South Australian Internet Exchange (SAIX) *	APIX
Oceania	Australia: Sydney	Sydney Internet Exchange (SIX) *	APIX
Oceania	Australia: Wollongong	Wollongong Internet Exchange (WIX) *	APIX
