= European Internet Exchange Association =

- Full name: European Internet Exchange Association
- Abbreviation: Euro-IX
- Founded: 2001; 24 years ago
- Location: Netherlands
- Website: Official website

The European Internet Exchange Association, or Euro-IX, is an association of European Internet exchange points. It is a community-driven association serving European Internet exchange points and Internet service providers and the general IP community, including politicians, regulators, vendors, and other industry related sectors. Euro-IX is part of the global IX-F Internet eXchange Federation.

== Euro-IX forums ==
Event	Date	Host	City	Country	Reference
27th Euro-IX Forum	25 October 2015 to 27 October 2015	BCIX and ECIX	Berlin	Germany	
26th Euro-IX Forum	12 April 2015 to 14 April 2015	France-IX	Marseille	France	
25th Euro-IX Forum	26 October 2014 to 28 October 2014	Interlan	Bucharest	Romania	
24th Euro-IX Forum	16 March 2014 to 18 March 2014	LINX, LONAP, IXLeeds	Leeds	United Kingdom	
23rd Euro-IX Forum	27 October 2013 to 29 October 2013	FICIX	Helsinki	Finland	
22nd Euro-IX Forum	14 April 2013 to 16 April 2013	DE-CIX	Hamburg	Germany	
21st Euro-IX Forum	11 November 2012 to 13 November 2012	Netnod	Stockholm	Sweden	
20th Euro-IX Forum	1 April 2012 to 3 April 2012	AMS-IX	Amsterdam	Netherlands	
19th Euro-IX Forum	17 October 2011 to 18 October 2011	LyonIX	Lyon	France	
18th Euro-IX Forum	30 May 2011 to 31 May 2011	MIX-IT	Catania	Italy	
17th Euro-IX Forum	27 September 2010 to 28 September 2010	NIX	Oslo	Norway	
16th Euro-IX Forum	19 April 2010 to 20 April 2010	BNIX	Brussels	Belgium	
15th Euro-IX Forum	2 November 2009 to 3 November 2009	NaMeX	Rome	Italy	
14th Euro-IX Forum	27 April 2009 to 28 April 2009	NIX.CZ	Prague	Czech Republic	
13th Euro-IX Forum	10 November 2008 to 11 November 2008	CIXP	Geneva	Switzerland	
12th Euro-IX Forum	21 April 2008 to 22 April 2008	Netnod	Stockholm	Sweden	
11th Euro-IX Forum	12 November 2007 to 13 November 2007	VIX	Vienna	Austria	
10th Euro-IX Forum	16 April 2007 to 17 April 2007	AMS-IX	Amsterdam	Netherlands	
9th Euro-IX Forum	23 October 2006 to 24 October 2006	DE-CIX	Frankfurt	Germany	
8th Euro-IX Forum	8 May 2006 to 9 May 2006	INEX	Dublin	Ireland	
7th Euro-IX Forum	September 2005	NIX.CZ	Prague	Czech Republic	
6th Euro-IX Forum	11 April 2005 to 12 April 2005	LINX	London	United Kingdom	
5th Euro-IX Forum	25 October 2004 to 26 October 2004	AIX	Athens	Greece	
4th Euro-IX Forum	19 April 2004 to 20 April 2004	DE-CIX	Berlin	Germany	
3rd Euro-IX Forum	3 November 2003 to 4 November 2003	GigaPIX	Lisbon	Portugal	
2nd Euro-IX Forum	31 March 2003 to 1 April 2003	Top-IX	Turin	Italy	
1st Euro-IX Forum	23 September 2002 to 24 September 2002	CatNIX	Barcelona	Spain	

== See also ==
- List of Internet exchange points
