= Internet exchange points in Ukraine =

Public Internet exchange points in Ukraine are:

- UA-IX in Kyiv
- Digital Telecom Internet Exchange (DTEL-IX) in Kyiv
- Giganet in Kyiv, Odesa, Kharkiv, Moscow, Warsaw
- Lviv Internet Exchange (LVIV-IX) in Lviv
- Donetsk Internet Exchange Point (EUNIC-IX) in Donetsk
- Kharkiv Internet Exchange (KH-IX) in Kharkiv
- Kherson Internet Exchange (KHS-IX) in Kherson
- Odesa Internet Exchange site (OD-IX) in Odesa
- Zaporizhzhia Internet Exchange (ZP-IX) in Zaporizhzhia

The most popular of these is the UA-IX with over 218 members and over 1000 Gbit/s steady throughput during peak hours on weekdays. However the most highloaded is Giganet with more than 380 members and over 2600 Gbit/s.

== See also ==
- Ukrainian Internet Exchange Network (UA-IX)
- List of Internet exchange points by size
- List of Internet exchange points
