= Punto Neutro de Intercambio de Tráfico de Costa Rica =

Costa Rica Internet Exchange Point

CRIX
- Full name: Punto Neutro de Intercambio de Internet de Costa Rica
- Abbreviation: CRIX
- Founded: 2014
- Location: San José, Costa Rica
- Website: crix.cr
- Members: 51
- Peak: 680 Gbps

Punto Neutro de Intercambio de Tráfico de Costa Rica (Costa Rica Neutral Internet Exchange Point) (CRIX), established in 2014, is an internet exchange point operated by NIC Costa Rica in San José, the capital of Costa Rica. NIC Costa Rica is a non-profit organization and specialized unit of the National Academy of Sciences. It is responsible for managing and providing top-level .cr domains and second-level .co.cr, .fi.cr, .or.cr, .sa.cr, .ed.cr, ac.cr and .go.cr domains.

CRIX has two points of presence, both in San José, for redundancy.

As a neutral IXP, CRIX connects today all the Service Providers in Costa Rica and hosts the most popular CDN (Content delivery network).

CRIX is an active member of different international organizations like the European Internet Exchange Association and Latin American and Caribbean Internet Exchange Association

== See also ==
- List of Internet exchange points
