= Swiss Internet Exchange =

Internet exchange point in Switzerland

SwissIX Internet Exchange
- Full name: SwissIX Internet Exchange
- Abbreviation: SwissIX
- Founded: 2001
- Location: Switzerland, Basel, Bern, Glattbrugg, Lupfig, Zürich
- Website: www.swissix.ch
- Members: 190
- Ports: 200
- Peak: 652.00 Gbit/s (January 2024)
- Daily (avg.): 510.38 Gbit/s (January 2024)

The SwissIX Internet Exchange (SwissIX) is an Internet Exchange Point (IXP) situated in Switzerland, currently in the following cities: Basel, Bern, Glattbrugg, Lupfig, Zürich. SwissIX is a fast-growing, non-profit, neutral and independent peering network. On 9 March 2001 SwissIX was established as an Association in Glattbrugg, operating under Swiss Law.

The SwissIX is the largest Internet Exchange Point in Switzerland, when measured by number of members and traffic. SwissIX is also member of the European Internet Exchange Association.

== Network ==
- NetIron MLXe-16 from Brocade Communications Systems as core IX switch
- FastIron X Series switches from Brocade Communications Systems as Edge switch

== See also ==
- List of Internet exchange points
