= Manchester Network Access Point =

Internet exchange point

Manchester Internet Access Point
- Abbreviation: MaNAP
- Founded: 1997
- Location: United Kingdom, Manchester
- Website: www.manap.net
- Members: 74

Manchester Network Access Point was a Manchester-based internet exchange point (IXP). The access point provides an exchange point for internet service providers and businesses in northern England and the Midlands and was the first Internet Exchange point in the UK outside London.

MaNAP was a membership-owned organisation, established in 1997 to enable internet companies in the North and Midlands to interconnect without the massive cost of running circuits to London and back.

== History ==
In June 1997, Manchester Network Access Point Ltd (MaNAP) was formed as a not-for-profit regional Internet exchange. In April 2005, MaNAP was taken over by NWIX Group Ltd and the network was expanded to better serve the North West region. MaNAP remained on a not-for-profit basis.

NWIX then expanded the exchange point's peering LAN to cover facilities outside of the North West of England, including in London, the Netherlands and Germany. The name was changed to Edge-IX.

Establishing a peering LAN over such a large area increased the costs and the fragility of the service to the extent that the exchange point failed commercially. NWIX was acquired in 2012, whilst in Administration, by a group of investors who established a business selling point to point Ethernet services on the former NWIX fibre infrastructure. This group closed Edge-IX within a year of the acquisition.

The London Internet Exchange now operate a small peering LAN for the Manchester ISP community called IXManchester. As a result, the only fully independent IXP outside of London in the UK, which is not owned and controlled by the London Internet Exchange, is IX Liverpool and IXLeeds.

== See also ==
- List of Internet exchange points
