= IIX =

IIX may refer to:

- 8 (number) or IIX in Roman numerals
- Indonesia Internet Exchange
- Israeli Internet Exchange
- Macintosh IIx
