= Telecommunications in Austria =

Telecommunications in Austria refers to communication using Internet and telephone networks, coupled with radio and television broadcast stations. 69% of Small and Medium-sized Enterprises (SMEs) have basic level of digital intensity.

== Infrastructure ==
The telephone system is highly developed and efficient. Fibre-optic coverage is extensive, although it remains very expensive. A full range of telephone and Internet services are available via the network.

Austria has 15 satellite earth stations, two Intelsat (one Atlantic Ocean and one Indian Ocean) and one Eutelsat. Additionally, there are around 600 very-small-aperture terminals (VSATs) (2007).

== Internet ==
=== User statistics ===
- 37 Internet service providers (ISPs), most of them organised in the local ISP association Internet Service Providers Austria, ISPA.
- 6.7 million Internet users, 50th in the world; 81% of the population, 29th in the world (2012).
- 2,074,252 fixed broadband subscriptions, 41st in the world; 25.2% of the population, 33rd in the world (2012).
- 4,564,834 mobile subscriptions, 40th in the world; 55.5% of the population, 23rd in the world (2012).
- 3.5 million Internet hosts, 30th in the world (2012).
- 300,000 Asymmetric Digital Subscriber Lines (ADSL).

The country code for Austria is "AT", the country code top level domain (ccTLD) is ".at".

=== Fixed broadband ===
Austria's fixed broadband (100 Mbit/s) take-up rate reaches 55%. Coverage of Very High Capacity Networks (VHCN) and Fibre to the Premises (FTTP) in Austria, at 73% and 56% respectively.

=== Internet censorship and surveillance ===
In August 2014, IFPI Austria has requested Internet blocking for several file sharing web sites such as The Pirate Bay and isoHunt, starting the latest August 14, 2014 (postponed from August 1, 2014). This procedure has been heavily criticized in the media, as there is no formal procedure for unblocking such IPs ever again, and no formal review process that incorrect blocks cannot be obtained. Users sharing an IP may be blocked as a side effect, too.

As of May 2016, Austrian ISPs are now once again free to unblock all previously blocked sites after the government appealed a new law for file sharing similar to the one in Switzerland. Although the IFPI is still trying to challenge this ruling.

There are no government restrictions on access to the Internet or credible reports that the government monitors e-mail or Internet chat rooms without appropriate legal authority. Individuals and groups engage in the peaceful expression of views via the Internet, including by e-mail. Authorities work to restrict access to Web sites containing information that violates the law, such as neo-Nazi and child pornography sites. Authorities restrict access to banned Web sites by trying to shut such sites and forbidding the country's Internet service providers to carry them.

The Austrian constitution provides for freedom of speech and press, and the government generally respects these rights in practice. An independent press, an effective judiciary, and a functioning democratic political system combine to ensure freedom of speech and the press. The independent media are active and express a wide variety of views with few restrictions. Individuals generally criticize the government publicly or privately without reprisal. The law prohibits arbitrary interference with privacy, family, home, or correspondence, and the government generally respects these prohibitions in practice.

The law prohibits incitement, insult, or contempt against a group because of its members’ race, nationality, or ethnicity if the statement violates human dignity and the government strictly enforces these laws. The law prohibits public denial, belittlement, approval, or justification of the Nazi genocide or other Nazi crimes against humanity in a print publication, a broadcast, or other media and the government strictly enforces these laws. Strict libel and slander laws discourage reporting of governmental abuse. For example, many observers believed that the ability and willingness of the police to sue for libel or slander discourages individuals from reporting abuse by police.

On 31 July 2012, a 26-year-old man received an 18-month sentence, of which 12 months were to be served, for posting that his favorite book was Hitler’s Mein Kampf and linking to Nazi material on his Facebook page.

In February 2007 Austrian authorities were able to uncover a "child-pornography ring" involving seventy-seven countries, based on a report by a man working for a Vienna-based Internet file-hosting service.

As of March 2022 the websites of RT have been blocked by the major Internet service providers.

In August 2022, ISPs were ordered to block further domains, as well as individual IP addresses belonging to CDN providers. The latter rendered a large number of websites to become unavailable.

== Telephones ==
- International calling code: 43

=== Fixed line phones ===
- 3.4 million fixed line phones, 47th in the world (2011).

The majority of fixed lines are analogue, with Integrated Services Digital Network (ISDN) lines for the remainder.

Fixed-line subscribership has been in decline since the mid-1990s and was eclipsed by mobile-cellular in the late 1990s.

=== Mobile phones ===
- 7.6 million mobile phone lines in use, 60th in the world (2011).

The Austrian mobile phone market is highly competitive, with some of the lowest rates in Europe. Due to the geographical structures of Austria (mountains, flat lands, lakes) many providers use it as a "testing range" for new services. Mobile number portability was introduced in 2008, allowing users to retain their mobile phone numbers when switching between network operators. The original area codes allocated to each operator can no longer be used to determine the network with which a subscriber is registered.

First generation networks

D-Netz by Telekom Austria. This network was switched off at the end of the 1990s.

Second generation networks

There are three nationwide GSM networks which also support additional brands and mobile virtual network operators (MVNOs).

- A1: originally Mobilkom. It now runs a mixed GSM-900, GSM-1800 and UMTS network. Also provides service for MVNO's bob, B-free (owned by A1), Red Bull Mobile and Yess!
- T-Mobile: originally max mobil. It now runs a mixed GSM-900, GSM-1800 and UMTS network. Also marketed as telering as a separate brand.
- Orange: originally One (until September 2008). A mixed GSM-1800 and UMTS network. Since end 2011 owned by Drei/Hutchinson Whampoa.

Third generation networks

Drei: Owned by Hutchinson Whampoa, a Hong Kong based company that runs its own UMTS network.

== Radio and television ==
- There are 2 AM, 160 FM and 1 shortwave radio broadcast stations, with several hundred FM repeaters.
- There were 6.08 million radios in Austria in 1997.
- There are 45 broadcast television stations, with in excess of 1000 repeaters.
- There were 4.25 million televisions in the country in 1997.

The largest broadcasting corporations are:

- Österreichischer Rundfunk (ORF), Austria's public broadcaster, was the main broadcast source until commercial radio and TV service was introduced in the 1990s.
- ATV, privately held
- Puls 4, privately held
- Servus TV, privately held

== See also ==
- Alpes Adria Internet Exchange (AAIX), a non-profit exchange located in Klagenfurt, Austria.
- Area codes in Austria
- Freinberg Transmitter
- List of radio stations in Austria and Liechtenstein
- Telephone numbers in Austria
