= RNT =

RNT may refer to:

- Radiodiffusion Nationale Tchadienne, state broadcaster of Chad
- Rank–nullity theorem, a theorem in linear algebra.
- Renton Municipal Airport, Washington, US
- ISP member of Interlan Romanian Internet Exchange
