= CHN-IX =

Internet exchange point in China

- Full name: CHN-IX
- Founded: (2016 unofficially 2015)
- Location: China
- Website: www.chn-ix.net
- Members: 10

CHN-IX is an internet exchange point based in mainland China. Established in 2016, CHN-IX is a non-profit, neutral and independent peering point. CHN-IX is the first professional Internet Exchange in China.

== History ==
CHN-IX was founded by ChinaCache on April 27, 2016. With technical support from Amsterdam Internet Exchange (AMS-IX), ChinaCache's CHN-IX is based on International Internet Exchange's operation rules and technical standards.

In April 2016, the ChinaCache board announce to create a legal framework to facilitate an expansion into mainland China. CHN-IX CEO Wang Song said that "The new mode of CHN-IX is the first of its kind in China and the high-end customizing orientation of Atecsys International Data Centre is also rare in domestic market."

- On 25 November 2015, ChinaCache Signed Strategic Agreement with AMS-IX to Develop an Internet Exchange.
- On 27 April 2016, ChinaCache launched CHN-IX Data Centre.
- By Aug 2016, CHN-IX has 10 mainstream SP/CP members and the peak traffic has grown to 10 Gbit/s.

== Co-locations ==
Currently, CHN-IX offers access points at Beijing, Guangzhou, Shanghai, Tianjin and Hangzhou, and will launch Zhengzhou, Xi’an and Shenzhen access Point.

== See also ==
- List of Internet exchange points
- ChinaCache
