= GrenoblIX =

Internet exchange point in France

- Founded: 2011
- Location: France, Grenoble
- Website: Official website

Grenoble Internet eXchange or GrenoblIX is the Internet eXchange point (IXP) of Grenoble in Isère and Auvergne – Rhône-Alpes region. GrenoblIX allows to the connected members to exchange traffic in order to avoid routing through faraway infrastructures. This Internet eXchange point is managed by the non-profit organization Rezopole, founded in 2001.

GrenoblIX is a GIX-NAP:

- the GIX, to exchange IP packets or peering (the exchange can be done on level 2 – BGP – or on level 3 by "route servers");
- the NAP (Network Access point), for a marketplace which allows members to buy or sell Internet transit and/or any layer 2 or IP services and all types of telecommunications services.

== Origin ==
GrenoblIX, a contraction of Grenoble and GIX (Global Internet eXchange), is the name of the Internet eXchange point (IXP) of Grenoble in Isère and Auvergne – Rhône-Alpes region.

GrenoblIX was founded in Grenoble in April 2011 by the non-profit organization Rezopole. It operates two sites: GrenoblIX 1 located in the COGENT datacenter, and GrenoblIX 2 located in the Eolas groupe datacenter. The last site is particular as it is considered as the first eco-friendly datacenter in France.

== Functioning ==
An IXP gives users the capacity to exchange Internet traffic through peering. The members can improve the quality of their bandwidth and avoid additional costs. The IXP is an important factor to develop the local Internet: the members located in the same area can exchange traffic locally instead of routing through remote infrastructure.

== Members ==
Any person having an Autonomous System number can be connected to GrenoblIX.

The members connected to IXP NAP are:

- ISPs (Internet service providers)
- Internet operators for companies
- datacenters
- e-commerce websites
- large private companies
- large public institutions

== Services ==
=== Services for members ===
GrenoblIX is an IXP/NAP: the IXP to exchange IP packets through peering (the exchange can be done on the level 2 or 3 by "routes servers"); the NAP (Network Access Point), for the IP transit market which allows to buy or sell Internet transit.

- 10/100/1000 Mbs copper links or 1/10 Gbit/s fibre
- Public peering IPv4/IPv6 unicast, IPv4 multicast
- Telecom services bought or sold through VLAN, Waves or intra-POP Optical Fibre
- Network equipment hosting services, remote recovery port, remote reboot
- DNS services
- The inter-IXP gateway services (route servers): peering level 3
- ROA (Route Origin Authorizations), RPKI

GrenoblIX is connected to LyonIX, FranceIX, NicIX, TouIX, TOP-IX, Equinix, etc.

=== Peering ===
In order to peer the members can filter the received routes and choose to announce their prefixes only on the certain Internet eXchange points in the whole BGP community. The IXP allows to the members to peer with the other members in France or abroad.

== Partners ==
GrenoblIX is managed by Rezopole and supported by the Grenoble-Alpes Métropole and the Auvergne – Rhône-Alpes region.

== See also ==
=== Connected articles ===
- Internet exchange point
- Peering
