= Singapore Internet Exchange =

Internet exchange point in Singapore

- Full name: Singapore Internet Exchange Ltd
- Abbreviation: SGIX
- Founded: 2009
- Location: Singapore, Singapore
- Website: www.sgix.sg
- Members: www.sgix.sg/peering-participants/
- Peak: 5.21 Tbit/s

The Singapore Internet Exchange (SGIX) is an Internet exchange point (IXP) with PoPs in major data centers within Singapore having 270 peering members and traffic averaging at 3.36 Tbit/s and peaking at 5.21 Tbit/s. The exchange was founded on 30 September 2009 as a company limited by guarantee in Singapore.

== See also ==
- List of Internet exchange points
