= DE-CIX Istanbul =

- Abbreviation: DE-CIX Istanbul
- Founded: 2015
- Location: Turkey, Istanbul
- Website: www.de-cix.net

DE-CIX Istanbul is a carrier and data center-neutral Internet exchange point (IX or IXP) in Istanbul, Turkey, founded in 2015 by DE-CIX. It is the only Internet exchange point that connects to both Europe and Asia within the same country.

== See also ==
- List of Internet exchange points
