= Middle East Internet Exchange =

Egyptian Subsidiary of GPX Global Systems

- Full name: Middle East Internet Exchange
- Abbreviation: MEIX
- Founded: 2002
- Location: Egypt
- Website: Official website

The Middle East Internet Exchange is a subsidiary of GPX Global Systems. The company was incorporated in August 2002 to develop and operate state-of-the-art, private, carrier neutral data centers in emerging commercial markets along the undersea cable systems of FLAG, SEA-ME-WE 3, and SEA-ME-WE 4.

== See also ==
- List of Internet exchange points
