= DE-CIX Palermo =

Internet exchange point in Italy

- Abbreviation: DE-CIX Palermo
- Founded: 2015
- Location: Palermo, Italy
- Website: www.de-cix.net

DE-CIX Palermo, is a carrier and data center-neutral internet exchange point (IX or IXP) in Palermo, Italy, founded in 2015 by DE-CIX.

The exchange is located in the carrier-neutral "Sicily Hub", TI Sparkle's (Telecom Italia) data center in Palermo.

== See also ==
- List of Internet exchange points
- Deutscher Commercial Internet Exchange
