= Uganda Internet Exchange Point =

Critical national communications infrastructure operator

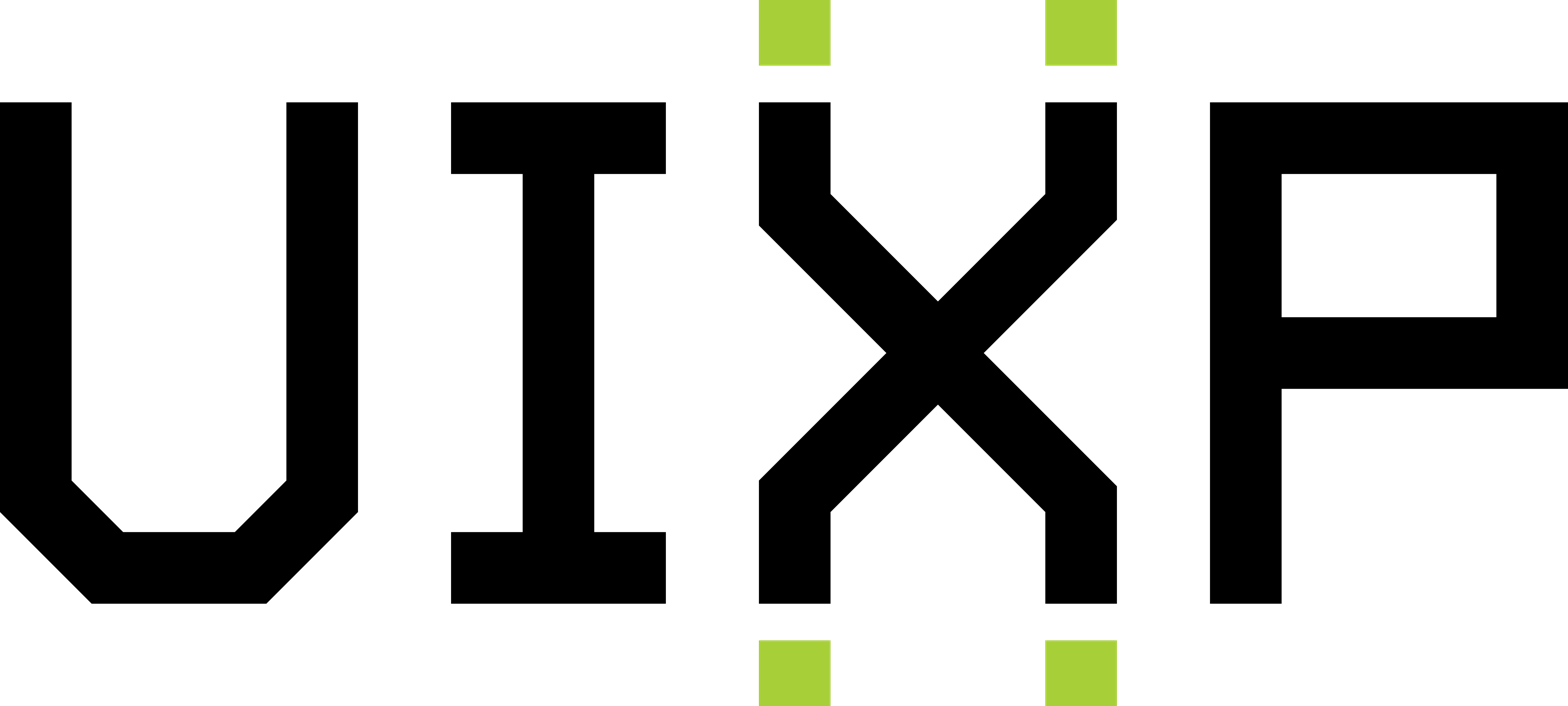
- Full name: Uganda Internet Exchange Point
- Abbreviation: UIXP
- Founded: 2001
- Location: Uganda
- Website: uixp.co.ug
- Members: 33
- Peak in: 40 Gb/s
- Peak out: 40 Gb/s

The Uganda Internet Exchange Point (UIXP) is a non-profit Internet exchange point operator founded in 2001 with the goal of improving Internet connectivity within Uganda and the East African region, and is the only known Internet exchange point in Uganda.

Its peering infrastructure enables networks to directly interconnect and exchange data traffic at a common point. This provides an efficient alternative to Internet transit.

== Motivation ==
The UIXP's establishment made online content and service deployments viable in Uganda and, over time, has lowered the cost of network service delivery, improved the routing efficiency, and increased the fault tolerance of the domestic and regional Internet.

Heavy increase in load on the UIXP infrastructure has led to maintenance issues due to increasing costs. The Ugandan government has made attempts to take ownership of and nationalize the organization.

In 2019, the Ugandan government proposed establishing a government-run Internet exchange point and increased regulation of private IXPs in Uganda, with the intention of replacing or tightly regulating private providers who offer the service. These proposed measures would primarily effect the business of the UIXP, as the only known IXP in Uganda. This proposal was met with criticism as a perceived attempt to regulate and censor Ugandan access to the internet after similar prior government actions, including levies on social media and blackouts of Facebook.

== Peering infrastructure ==
The UIXP operates a layer 2 peering infrastructure that is accessible from two interconnected locations within the greater Kampala area. The UIXP supports both bilateral and multilateral peering via IPv4 and IPv6. In 2021 the UIXP expanded its peering LAN into the Raxio carrier neutral data center located in the Kampala Industrial and Business Park.

== See also ==
- List of Internet exchange points
- Communications in Uganda
