= PIRIX =

Internet exchange point in Russia

- Full name: PIRIX Internet Exchange
- Abbreviation: PIRIX
- Founded: 2009
- Location: Russia, Saint-Petersburg
- Website: www.pirix.ru
- Members: 41
- Peak in: 15 Gb/s
- Peak out: 15 Gb/s

PIRIX Internet Exchange is Internet Exchange Point situated in Saint-Petersburg (Russia).

PIRIX is a center for broadband connectivity and Internet services in Saint-Petersburg. It offers peering, switching and housing facilities to Internet Access and Service Providers. PIRIX started in 2009 and is a fast-growing, neutral and independent peering point.

== Customers ==
More than 40 different carriers and ISPs now participate in PIRIX data-points, including:

- Google
- Yandex
- Interzet
- ER-Telecom

== See also ==
- List of Internet exchange points
