= Calgary Internet Exchange =

Internet exchange point in Canada

- YYCIX
Name	YYCIX Internet Exchange Community Ltd
Abbreviation	YYCIX
Founded	December, 2012
Location	Canada, Calgary, AB
Website	yycix.ca
Participants (as of Apr, 2020)	64
- Daily traffic (as of Apr, 2020)
Max	55 Gbit/s
Average	39 Gbit/s

The YYCIX Internet Exchange Community Ltd (YYCIX) in Calgary, Canada is the first Internet exchange point (IXP) in Alberta. It allows the local exchange of Internet traffic between members, staying within Canadian jurisdiction, optimizing the performance and economy of traffic flows, and limiting the potential for extra-legal surveillance. The YYCIX follows IXP best-practices, in that it is neutral and independent, has no mandatory fees, and is supported entirely through voluntary donations. The YYCIX is incorporated as a Canadian tax-exempt non-profit corporation.

== Technology ==
The YYCIX is currently running on a variety of Cisco equipment, supporting speeds of 1 Gbit/s on copper, or 1 Gbit/s to 100 Gbit/s on fibre. The YYCIX provides NTP and an optional BGP route reflectors for multilateral peering.

Both IPv4 and IPv6 peering is possible and encouraged at the YYCIX.

== Availability ==
YYCIX is currently available in the following locations in Calgary:

DataHive - Data Centre

- Suite 300, 840 – 7th Avenue SW, Calgary, Alberta
- Signed a Memorandum of Understanding which provides no-cost cross-connects to members inside its data centre
- Colocation, many carriers, Hurricane Electric
- YYCIX switch ports: 1G/10/25/40/100G SM/MM

Q9 Calgary Three - Data Centre

- 5300 86 Ave SE, Calgary, Alberta
- Colocation, many carriers
- YYCIX switch ports: 1G/10G/25G/40G/100G SM/MM

Shaw (ViaWest Calgary) - Data Centre

- 7007 69 Ave SE, Calgary, Alberta
- Colocation, many carriers
- YYCIX switch ports: 1G/10G/25G/40G/100G SM/MM

Arrow Calgary - Data Centre

- 330 - 840 7th Ave SW
- Colocation, interconnects to Telecom
- YYCIX switch ports: 1G/10/25/40/100 SM/MM

City of Calgary - City Hall

- City of Calgary, 800 Macleod Trail SE, Calgary, Alberta
- No colocation permitted, only provides circuit connects to YYCIX
- YYCIX switch ports: 1G/10G/25G/40G/100G SM/MM

Rogers DC2

- 1313 10th Ave SW
- Colocation, interconnects to Telecom
- YYCIX switch ports: 1G/10/25/40/100 SM

== See also ==
- List of Internet exchange points
