= Asia Pacific Internet Exchange Association =

- Full name: Asia Pacific Internet Exchange Association
- Abbreviation: APIX
- Location: Singapore
- Website: apix.asia
- Ports: N/a
- Peak: N/a
- Peak in: N/a
- Peak out: N/a
- Daily (avg.): N/a
- Daily in (avg.): N/a
- Daily out (avg.): N/a

APIX is an association of Internet exchange points in the Asia Pacific region. APIX is also part of the global IX-F Internet eXchange Federation.

== See also ==
- List of Internet exchange points
