= Croatian Internet eXchange =

Internet exchange point in Croatia

- Full name: Croatian Internet eXchange
- Abbreviation: CIX
- Founded: 2000
- Location: Croatia
- Website: Official website

Croatian Internet eXchange (CIX) is the main Croatian Internet exchange point. It is located at the University Computing Center (SRCE) in Zagreb. Although there is no formal obligation to use the exchange, all Croatian ISPs are allowed to do so. CIX uses the BGP protocol to establish peering between ISPs, and a RIPE database for documentation. Switched Ethernet is used for the actual data interchanging.

== See also ==
- List of Internet exchange points
