= Singapore Open Exchange =

Internet exchange point in Singapore

- Full name: Singapore Open Exchange
- Abbreviation: SOX
- Founded: 2001
- Location: Singapore, Singapore
- Website: Official website
- Members: 24
- Ports: 24

The Singapore Open Exchange (SOX) is an Internet Exchange Point (IXP) situated in Singapore. It was established on 3 September 2001. SOX is a non-profit, neutral, and independent peering network.

== Members ==
SOX has 24 members:

ASN	Membername
AS7610	National University Of Singapore
AS42 / AS3856	Packet Clearing House
AS23711	F.Root Servers (SIN1)
AS703	Verizon
AS15169	Google
AS8075	Microsoft
AS17547	Qala
AS23855	SingAREN
AS23728	Republic Polytechnic
AS4628	Pacific Internet
AS7575	AARNet
AS55818	Matrix Networks
AS17617	Nanyang Polytechnic
AS9877	Ngee Ann Polytechnic
AS16509	Amazon
AS45133	Singapore Polytechnic
AS38182	Extreme Broadband
AS56094	ITE
AS4775	Globe
AS33438	StackPath
AS9292	Temasek Polytechnic
AS131475	Singapore Institute of Technology (SIT)
AS6939	Hurricane Electric
AS133487	Blackboard

== See also ==
- List of Internet exchange points
