= African IXP Association =

Group of Internet exchange point operators

- Full name: The African IXP Association
- Abbreviation: AFIX
- Founded: 2012; 14 years ago
- Website: http://www.af-ix.net/

The African IXP Association, or AFIX, is an association of Internet exchange points that operate in the African region. It is a community-driven organization that aims to promote the interests of its members and improve connectivity within the continent.

AFIX is a member of the global Internet Exchange Federation (IX-F). Membership in AFIX is free and open to all operators of Internet Exchange Points in Africa.

== Meetings ==
The African IXP Association typically meets annually at the African Peering and Interconnection Forum (AfPIF) and occasionally meets bi-annually at the African Internet Summit (AIS).

== See also ==
- List of Internet exchange points
