= Danish Internet Exchange Point =

Internet exchange point in Denmark

- Full name: Danish Internet Exchange Point
- Abbreviation: DIX
- Founded: 1994
- Location: Denmark, Kongens Lyngby
- Website: Official website
- Peak: 80 Gbps

Danish Internet Exchange Point (DIX) is an internet exchange point operated by i2 in Kongens Lyngby north of Copenhagen, the capital of Denmark. Two points of presence were opened since 2011.

Its purpose is to alleviate the exchange of data traffic between networks that constitute the Danish part of the global Internet structure. The DIX was established in May 1994 and has most of the Danish Internet service providers connected.

== Technology ==
The DIX offers several options to connect to the neutral net:

- Switched 1 Gbit Gigabit Ethernet. The member must use a 1G-LX singlemode optical module.
- Switched 10 Gbit 10 Gigabit Ethernet. The member must use a 10G-LR singlemode optical module.
- Switched 40 Gbit 40 Gigabit Ethernet.
- Switched 100 Gbit 100 Gigabit Ethernet.

== See also ==
- List of Internet exchange points
