= Frankfurt Internet Exchange =

The Frankfurt Internet Exchange (F-IX) is an Internet Exchange Point located in Frankfurt.

In 2004 the exchange was acquired by XchangePoint Europe, an international network of internet exchanges. In 2005 XchangePoint was acquired by PacketExchange. It was established and serves the city of Frankfurt, Germany.

On 11 March 2020 set a new personal record of 9.1Tbps. The record coincided with increased internet usage during the COVID-19 pandemic.
