= Vienna Internet Exchange =

Internet exchange point in Austria

- Full name: Vienna Internet Exchange
- Abbreviation: VIX
- Founded: 1996
- Location: Austria, Vienna
- Website: Official website
- Members: 121
- Peak: ~216 Gbit/s
- Daily (avg.): ~137 Gbit/s

The Vienna Internet Exchange (VIX) is an Internet Exchange Point (IXP) situated in Vienna, Austria. It was established in 1996. VIX is a non-profit, neutral, and independent peering network.

VIX is the largest Internet Exchange Point in Austria, when measured by number of members and traffic.

== History ==
The Vienna Internet Exchangepoint hosted the 11th Euro-IX Forum, held 12–13 November 2007.

== See also ==
- List of Internet exchange points
