= DE-CIX Marseille =

Internet exchange point in France

- Abbreviation: DE-CIX Marseille
- Founded: 2015
- Location: Marseille, France
- Website: www.de-cix.net

DE-CIX Marseille, is a carrier and data center-neutral internet exchange point (IX or IXP) in Marseille, France, founded in 2015 by DE-CIX.

The exchange is located in the carrier-neutral Interxion data center in Marseille.

== See also ==
- List of Internet exchange points
