= Ottawa Internet Exchange =

Internet exchange point in Canada

- Full name: Ottawa Internet Exchange
- Abbreviation: OttIX
- Founded: 2000
- Location: Canada, Ottawa, Ontario
- Website: www.ottix.net
- Members: 13
- Ports: 58
- Peak in: 420 Mb/s
- Peak out: 420 Mb/s

The Ottawa Internet Exchange (OttIX) was a federally incorporated not-for-profit Internet Exchange Point (IXP) located in Ottawa, Ontario, Canada. As of January 2013, OttIX had 13 members Traffic rates were as high as 420 Mbit/s at peak.

Ottawa-Gatineau Internet Exchange (OGIX) is now providing this service for the National Capital Region (Canada).

== See also ==
- List of Internet exchange points
