= Alpes Adria Internet Exchange =

Internet exchange point in Austria

- Full name: Alpes Adria Internet Exchange
- Abbreviation: AAIX
- Location: Austria, Klagenfurt
- Website: www.aaix.at
- Members: 17

The Alpes Adria Internet Exchange (AAIX) is an Internet exchange point situated in Klagenfurt, Austria. AAIX is a non-profit, neutral and independent peering point. The AAIX is sponsored and does not bill any cost for the connect. AAIX is also member of the European Internet Exchange Association.

== See also ==
- List of Internet exchange points
- List of Internet exchange points by size
