= Nepal Internet Exchange =

Nepalese Internet exchange point

- Full name: Nepal Internet Exchange
- Abbreviation: NPIX
- Founded: 2002
- Location: Nepal
- Website: npix.net.np
- Members: 49

Nepal Internet Exchange is Nepal's only Internet exchange point, established to keep local traffic local and improve local web surfing with local content while saving international bandwidth. It was established in 2002 with the help of Packet Clearing House.

== Locations ==
NPIX Maintains two IX locations: One in Jawalkhel (Lalitpur), and another in Putalisadak (Kathmandu district). Members connect to one or both of these locations. The two facilities at Jawalakhel and Putalisadak run Cisco and Extreme switching platform respectively. Both locations provide 100 Mbit/s, 1 Gbit/s and 10 Gbit/s ports to members.

== Members ==
NPIX members include major telcos, NSPs, ISPs, National Research Network and Anycast Operators. As of November 2020, the NPIX has 49 participating networks. NPIX is an open IXP allowing anyone with their own AS-Number and IP Address block to become a member and start an exchange of traffic with other members.

Among others, members include DNS Anycast operators providing instances of D, E, I, and L root name servers and over 100 gTLDs/ccTLDs.

== Traffic ==
As of June 2024, the exchange is carrying about 40 Gbit/s of Internet bandwidth.

== See also ==
- List of Internet exchange points
