= Global Network Management =

Dutch telecommunications company

GNM (Global Network Management) is a Dutch backbone telecommunications company that operates the carrier-neutral Internet Exchange GNM-IX. The company maintains an extensive optical backbone across Europe and Asia, offering interconnection, IP transit, and wavelength transport services.

== Overview ==
GNM operates more than 80 Points of Presence (PoPs) and interconnects over 650 networks through its 20,000 km DWDM backbone. The company supports traffic exchange and transport services for telecom operators, Internet service providers, content delivery networks, and enterprises. Its infrastructure spans major connectivity hubs across Europe, including Amsterdam, Frankfurt, Vienna, Prague, and Warsaw.

== GNM-IX ==
GNM-IX, the company's carrier-neutral Internet Exchange, reached a new peak traffic record of 10 terabits per second (Tbps) in 2025.

According to the IXP Database (IXPDB), maintained by Euro-IX, GNM-IX ranks 5th globally by the number of connected autonomous systems (ASNs), with around 650 connected networks as of October 2025.

== Network expansion ==
In 2025, GNM completed several infrastructure upgrades across Europe. The company modernised its point of presence in Sofia, Bulgaria, by deploying the Arista 7800R3 routers with native 400G capacity, improving network resilience and latency for routes connecting the Balkans, Turkey, the Middle East, and the Caucasus.

The same year, GNM launched a new Point of Presence in Amsterdam at Digital Realty AMS17, expanding its presence to 11 data centres in the city.

GNM also collaborated with Zayo Europe to deploy a 100G wavelength route between Marseille and Amsterdam, strengthening its pan-European backbone. Additionally, the company rolled out about 3,000 km of DWDM infrastructure through Romania, Bulgaria, and Serbia, extending its network reach toward the Middle East.
