= Manitoba Internet Exchange =

Internet exchange point in Canada

- Abbreviation: MBIX
- Founded: September 2011
- Location: Canada, Winnipeg, Manitoba
- Website: mbix.ca
- Members: 31
- Ports: 38
- Peak in: 3.05Gbit/s

The Manitoba Internet Exchange Inc (MBIX) is an Internet exchange point situated in Winnipeg, Manitoba, Canada. It allows traffic between members to stay within the Canadian jurisdiction, optimizing the performance and economy of traffic flows, while limiting the potential for extra-legal surveillance. MBIX is incorporated as a Manitoban tax-exempt non-profit corporation.

== Technology ==
As of 2021 MBIX is running 4 switches.

- a Cisco Nexus 93180-EX Ethernet switch, supporting speeds of 1 Gbit/s/10 Gbit/s on fibre
- a Cisco Nexus 93180-FX Ethernet switch, supporting speeds of 1 Gbit/s/10 Gbit/s/25 Gbit/s on fibre
- 2x Cisco Nexus 3064-PQ Ethernet switch, supporting speeds of 1 Gbit/s/10 Gbit/s on fibre

MBIX provides NTP and an optional BGP route reflector for multilateral peering.

Both IPv4 and IPv6 peering are possible and both are encouraged at MBIX.

== Services Available ==
MBIX offers several services under its own ASNs.

- Route Servers: MBIX provides managed route servers giving a safe, hands-off way of establishing multilateral peering with all peers.
- NTP Services: MBIX provides public NTP services under the hostname time.mbix.ca which round robins between time{1..3}.mbix.ca

Other services present at, but not directly provided by MBIX include:

- DNS Roots: many Root, TLD and CCTLD DNS servers are available via MBIX.

== Availability ==
As of 2021 MBIX is available in four data centres in Winnipeg:

- Global Server Centre, Suite 570 – 167 Lombard Avenue
- LES.NET YWG2, Suite 201 - 294 Portage Avenue
- Manitoba Hydro Telecom Data Centre, 360 Portage Avenue
- LES.NET YWG4, Suite 825 - 355 Portage Avenue

== See also ==
- List of Internet exchange points
