= Tasmanian Internet Exchange =

Neutral Internet Exchange Point in Hobart, Tasmania, Australia

- Full name: Tasmanian Internet Exchange
- Abbreviation: TAS-IX
- Founded: 2024
- Location: Australia, Hobart
- Website: Official website
- Peak: 1 Gb/s

The Tasmanian Internet Exchange (TAS-IX) was formed in 2024 as a neutral Internet Exchange Point in Hobart, Tasmania. TAS-IX facilitates a peak transfer rate of over 1 gigabit per second.

The exchange is operated by the Internet Association of Australia (IAA) which is a not-for-profit, member driven, licensed telecommunications carrier. The Association operates Internet Exchange Points across Australia.

There are two main locations, the DC3 data centre building in the Hobart suburb of Dowsing Point, and 7HOB, which is the main point of interconnect for the NBN network in Hobart. (itnews incorrectly reports the suburb for DC3 as Cranbourne.)

== See also ==
- List of Internet exchange points
