= Northern Lights Local Exchange Point =

Internet exchange point in the United States

The Northern Lights Local Exchange Point (NLLXP) is a free Internet Exchange Point (IXP) in Minneapolis, Minnesota, in the United States. The NLLXP public peering exchange is closely linked with the Northern Lights GigaPoP (NLG), an Internet2 project of the University of Minnesota Office of Information and Technology: the NLG is the regional Internet2 access point for research and educational institutions, and the NLLXP is the regional peering exchange between those institutions and commercial networks, and among commercial networks.

As of August 23, 2008 there were 22 members participating in the NLLXP, advertising 439 unique BGP routes from 93 originating autonomous systems. NLLXP participants include Internet content creators, Internet service hosting providers, and Internet access providers.

== Technology ==
The core of the Northern Lights Local Exchange Point (NLLXP) is a single Juniper Networks T640 router, acting as a Layer-3 IXP. Similar to at IXPs using a route reflector, each member peers with the IXP's autonomous system, making member BGP configurations simple to configure and maintain.

The NLLXP core router is located at 90 Church Street, on the campus of the University of Minnesota. Using Metro Ethernet, the NLLXP has been extended to an Ethernet switch located in the Minnesota Gateway colocation facility, where many metro-area members connect. Cross-connects from the NLLXP Ethernet switch are available within the Minnesota Gateway colocation facility. Extensions of these cross-connects to other locations using Metro Ethernet or intercity managed wavelength are available from several carriers.

== See also ==
- List of Internet exchange points
