= PacketExchange =

British network services provider, 2002–2011

- Full name: PacketExchange
- Founded: 2002
- Location: London, England
- Website: Official website

PacketExchange was a British multinational network services provider based in London. The company was founded in 2002 by Jason Velody and Kieron O'Brien, with Nigel Titley, Giles Heron and Katie Snowball as the founding team. Its network connected 45 points of presence across Europe, Asia and the United States over a private backbone consisting primarily of multiple 10 Gigabit Ethernet links over dedicated wavelengths on a fiber-optic mesh.

PacketExchange's services included the Ethernet Private Line, wide-area peering, community of interest networking, content delivery network, single and multi-homed Internet transit, and dedicated Internet access. The company also offered expertise in peering and infrastructure to support cloud computing.

== Company history ==
The company was founded to act as a wide-area Internet Exchange Point and application delivery service provider. The company's original business model was to use Ethernet and MPLS technology to build a distributed Internet Exchange Point as well as to provide point-to-point Ethernet connectivity. Using the model, over 140 networks peered traffic over the PacketExchange network. The commoditization of the IP market forced the company to evolve.

In January 2005, PacketExchange acquired and integrated XchangePoint. In October 2007, PacketExchange was hired by the rock band Radiohead for the internet release of their album In Rainbows. In February 2008, Rick Mace became the new CEO, and PacketExchange secured an additional $12 million investment. The company added two network points of presence during 2008: one in the Telx colocation facility in New York, and another in Singapore.

In January 2010, Mzima Networks announced that its network assets were acquired by PacketExchange. Grant Kirkwood became PacketExchange's CTO. The two companies merged customer bases and operations.

=== Mzima Networks ===
The Mzima Network was a data network and Internet Protocol (IP) computer network extending across the United States, Europe, and Asia. The word Mzima means “alive” in the Kiswahili language.

The network was started in California in 2001 by Mzima Corporation, N.A, which acquired several companies with Internet networks. In 2005, the Mzima Network became the first all-10 Gigabit Ethernet backbone through a partnership with Force10 Networks. In 2006, the Mzima IP backbone network expanded into Europe, providing connectivity for content providers, enterprise companies, and international telecommunication carriers. The fault-tolerant designed backbone network connected Tier 1 network carriers and network providers that engage in private peering.

=== Acquisition ===
In May 2011, Global Telecom & Technology (GTT) acquired PacketExchange for $20 million in cash.

== See also ==
- List of Internet exchange points
