= Finnish Communication and Internet Exchange =

Internet exchange point in Finland

- Full name: Finnish Communication and Internet Exchange
- Abbreviation: FICIX
- Founded: 1993
- Location: Finland
- Website: www.ficix.fi
- Members: 54 (2024)

Finnish Communication and Internet Exchange – FICIX ry is the first and the biggest Internet exchange point in Finland. As of 2009, FICIX consists of three exchange points.

FICIX was founded in 1993 and was originally called the "Finnish Commercial Internet Exchange". The name was changed to the current form in 2001, when a non-profit organization was founded to maintain operations.

FICIX-1 is located in Otaniemi, Espoo. Established in 1999, FICIX-2 is located in Pasila, Helsinki. FICIX-3 is located in Oulu and was established in March 2008. FICIX also operates the three root nameservers located in Finland, I (in Espoo), K (in Helsinki), and J (in Oulu).

== See also ==
- List of Internet exchange points

== External resources ==
- Media related to Finnish Communication and Internet Exchange at Wikimedia Commons
- Official website
