= Neutral Internet Exchange =

Internet exchange point in the Netherlands

NL-ix
- Full name: NL-ix
- Abbreviation: NL-ix
- Founded: 2002
- Location: Netherlands
- Website: www.nl-ix.net
- Members: 661
- Ports: 1762
- Peers: 513
- Peak in: 8.61 Tbit/s
- Peak out: 8.61 Tbit/s
- Daily in (avg.): 1.08 Tbit/s
- Daily out (avg.): 1.08 Tbit/s

Year	Peak traffic
2003	800 Mbit/s
2004	6.2 Gbit/s
2005	10.0 Gbit/s
2006	13.1 Gbit/s
2007	16.3 Gbit/s
2008	42.4 Gbit/s
2009	40.3 Gbit/s
2010	118.2 Gbit/s
2011	146.7 Gbit/s
2012	220.1 Gbit/s
2013	403.9 Gbit/s
2014	701.3 Gbit/s
2015	1.3424 Tbit/s
2023	7,98 Tbit/s
2024	8,61 Tbit/s
2025	12,27 Tbit/s

NL-ix (with the last two letters typeset in lowercase) - formerly known as Neutral Internet Exchange - is an Internet Exchange in Europe, which is distributed across ninety-six datacenters in sixteen European cities in eight countries by year-end 2023. The exchange was founded in 2002 to serve as an alternative to the Amsterdam Internet Exchange. As of March 2024, the peak traffic is 8.61 Tbit/s and 630 members are connected. On March 4, 2011, it was announced that Dutch landline and mobile telecommunications company KPN had purchased and, subsequently, acquired the exchange.

== Datacenters ==
NL-ix members can connect at over 90 sites in 16 cities across 8 countries.
