= Digital Telecom Internet Exchange =

Internet exchange point in Ukraine

- Full name: Digital Telecom Internet Exhchange
- Abbreviation: DTEL-IX
- Founded: 2009
- Location: Ukraine, Kyiv
- Website: link (in English)
- Members: 239 As of February 2021
- Ports: >250
- Peers: 239 As of February 2021
- Peak: 2.2Tbps As of January 2021
- Daily (avg.): 2.2Tbps As of January 2021

Digital Telecom Internet Exchange ("DTEL-IX") is an Internet exchange point (IXP) situated in Kyiv, Ukraine. It was founded in 2009 to help establish peering for Ukrainian and international operators. This IXP currently has 239 members, with a maximum throughput of 2.2 Tbps.

== History ==
- Founded in 2009 and built its first POP in Newtelco Ukraine DC
- Started operations in BeMobile DC in February 2017 providing physical and virtual cross-connection services inside own meet-me-room.
- As of April 2017, DTEL-IX started to offer 100GE interfaces to its customers.
- 2019. Joined MANRS initiative after implementing MANRS for IXPs requirements.
- Started migration to own data-center in 2021

== DTEL-IX Services ==
- Public peering via route servers with both IPv4 and IPv6;
- Private peering in public VLAN;
- Private peering in private VLANs;
- Colocation;
- Multicast exchange
- Physical Cross Connects in BeMobile DC

== See also ==
- List of Internet exchange points
