= Latvian Internet Exchange =

Internet exchange point in Latvia

Latvian Internet Exchange (LIX) — is an internet exchange point located in Riga, Latvia.
