= Indonesia Internet Exchange =

Internet exchange point in Indonesia

- Full name: Indonesia Internet Exchange
- Abbreviation: IIX
- Founded: 1997
- Location: Indonesia, Jakarta
- Website: Official website

The Indonesia Internet Exchange (IIX) is the national interconnection point for Internet Service Providers in Indonesia. Launched in August 1997, the IIX is operated by the Indonesian Internet Service Providers Association (APJII).

== Indonesian Internet ==
The Internet in Indonesia, like most countries, was started at university campuses. In the beginning ITB (Institut Teknologi Bandung –- Bandung Institute of Technology) and UI (Universitas Indonesia) were the pioneering institutions. The University of Indonesia was especially active in the development of the Indonesian internet, with IANA appointing the University of Indonesia's Mr. Rahmat M. Samik Ibrahim as the administrator for .id, the Top Level Domain for Indonesia.

The basic internet service that was first introduced in Indonesia was UUCP (Unix to Unix Copy Protocol), for exchanging e-mail with others in Indonesia as well as the global internet. Without military or other government aid, the high cost of international dedicated transmission was not an option for the connection, and therefore International Direct Dialing (IDD) was used for the UUCP link.

== Indonesian Internet Service Providers ==
The Indonesian government in 1994 saw that the Internet industry was tightly connected to the globally developing telecommunications industry and therefore decided to grant Internet Service Provider licenses through the Department of Tourism, Post and Telecommunications (now the Ministry of Communication and Information Technology). The first license (License No.: PT.102/3/4/MPPT-94, signed by Mr. Joop Ave) was issued on December 23, 1994 to PT. Rahajasa Media Internet (RadNet) owned and led by Mr. Roy Rahajasa Yamin.

Other companies followed suit such as secondly PT Indointernet led by Mr. Sanjaya. However, Indonet started its operations at Jakarta in 1994 before the government began issuing licenses for ISP operations. Indonet initiated its internet connectivity with a 9600 bit/s modem dialing through IDD to Singapore. Through this connection, TELNET and IRC services were available freely to anyone with a modem.

The two ISPs no longer used IDD dial-up modem to connect to the internet, instead using dedicated International connections through Indosat's submarine cable to Sprint (USA) and SingTel (Singapore). As the costs for these international connections are high, users were now charged for the connection they used, and in return all services were made available including HTTP and NNTP.

By early 1996 the government had issued 27 ISP licenses; the ISPs then formed APJII (Asosiasi Penyelenggara Jasa Internet Indonesia –– Indonesian Internet Service Provider Association) and worked closely with the regulators. Internet Connectivity tariffs for end users were issued in May 1996 and still stand today.

Out of the 27 licenses issued, only 15 ISPs were in operation before 1997. Thus there were 15 International connections from Indonesia to the Internet, which were separated one from the other. Each ISP was therefore burdened with half the circuit cost to Indosat and half the circuit cost to the US.

By the end of 1997 there were 45 licenses issued by the government, with 35 ISPs actively in operation.

== Birth of the Indonesian Internet Exchange (IIX) ==
With 35 active ISPs, the need for interconnectivity between the ISPs in operation began to be seen as a significant issue. Local traffic was going through international channels and several hops before it came back to Indonesia. A solution was needed to cut down international costs and provide faster access to local Indonesian destinations.

Government-initiated programs such as the Nusantara 21 and Telematika were eagerly awaited by the internet industry, but never came into effect; it had been planned that these programs would solve the local bandwidth and connectivity issues for all internet traffic in Indonesia.

As the need for local connectivity mounted, the ISPs could no longer wait for the government, so in June 1997 APJII formed a task force to develop an exchange for the internet. The task force, consisting of top technicians from each active ISP and Cisco, then developed the new Indonesian Internet Exchange (IIX), a logistical network that would connect every ISP in Indonesia to a single exchange point. The IIX was officially launched in August 1997.

Without funding from the government, the IIX was promoted by the non-profit Indonesian Internet Service Provider Association (APJII), which sought sponsorship from international vendors to build the much-needed Internet exchange. Major vendors contributed routers, switches, hubs, servers, and software to APJII for the IIX. These vendors included Cisco, Hewlett Packard, Bay, Microsoft, RAD, and Digital. IP exchange blocks for routing were provided by Bill Manning of isi.edu. The distance from one ISP in Indonesia to another ISP in Indonesia, which was usually more than 12 hops, was shortened to only 4 hops.

== See also ==
- List of Internet exchange points
