= ChinaCache =

Content delivery network

ChinaCache, Inc.
- Native name: 北京蓝汛通信
- Company type: Public
- Traded as: Nasdaq: CCIH
- Founded: 1998; 28 years ago
- Founder: Song Wang
- Headquarters: Beijing, China
- Key people: Song Wang (CEO)
- Products: Content delivery
- Website: en.chinacache.com

ChinaCache, Inc. (Chinese: 藍汛) is a Chinese company that provides Internet content and application delivery services. It was founded in 1998 by Song Wang.

ChinaCache's network is interconnected with the dominant telecom carrier's networks (China Mobile, China Unicom, China Telecom) and local Internet service providers in China.

The company is headquartered in Beijing, China, with offices in Sunnyvale, CA, Diamond Bar, CA, London, UK, and Hong Kong. In 2017, ChinaCache received National CDN License from the Chinese government.

== History ==
- ChinaCache was founded by Song Wang in 1998.
- In 2000, ChinaCache received the CDN license from China's Ministry of Industry and Information Technology.
- In 2007, ChinaCache North America was established to expand operations globally. The first office is constructed in Diamond Bar, CA, followed by a research and development center in Sunnyvale, opened in 2011.
- In October 2010, ChinaCache filed for IPO and was subsequently listed on Nasdaq; ticker symbol CCIH.
- In 2013, Atecsys Data Center, operated by ChinaCache, is established. In the same year, ChinaCache opened an office in Hong Kong, expanding service capacities in APAC.
- In 2015, ChinaCache opened an office in London, UK.
- In September 2019, ChinaCache announced its de-listing from the NASDAQ.
- In 2023, EdgeNext Completed Acquisition of ChinaCache’s Overseas Business.

== ChinaCache Network ==
ChinaCache maintains more than 500 service nodes in more than 120 major cities globally and across China. Its network in interconnected to China Telecom, China Netcom, China Mobile, China Unicom, China Railcom, China CERNET and various other access providers.

== Partnerships ==
- In 2007, ChinaCache received a $31.5 million investment from Intel Capital and Ignition Partners. In the same year, it also announced a partnership with RawFlow, a provider of live peer-to-peer streaming technologies.
- In 2008, ChinaCache partnered with Adobe Systems to offer Flash Video Streaming Service in China.
- In 2008, ChinaCache announced support for Microsoft Silverlight, a cross-platform and cross-browser plug-in.
- In August 2011, ChinaCache announced a partnership with the Shanxi Unicom and Wentian Technology to Build Shanxi's Largest Cloud Computing Data Center to enable facilities including disaster recovery centers, enterprise data centers and Internet data centers.
- In 2012, ChinaCache collaborated with Telekom Malaysia, Hutchison Global Communications and Interxion to expand their services in Asia and Europe.
- In August 2013, ChinaCache collaborated with Microsoft Corporation to integrate the company's CDN and other services with Windows Azure China in order to service customers in China.
- In August 2013, ChinaCache announced a partnership with Kingsoft Cloud Group to provide a comprehensive suite of cloud-based network services.
