= PeeringDB =

Database of internet interconnection elements

- Original authors: Richard Steenbergen (Original) & PeeringDB Volunteers
- Developer: PeeringDB
- Release: July 29, 2010
- Stable release: 2.80.1 / 24 June 2026; 15 days ago
- Written in: Python
- Operating system: Cloud
- Platform: Cross-platform
- Available in: English and 16 translations
- License: Code is published under a BSD 2-clause license
- Website: www.peeringdb.com
- Repository: www.github.com/peeringdb/peeringdb

PeeringDB is a freely available, user-maintained, database of networks, and the go-to location for interconnection data. The database facilitates the global interconnection of networks at Internet Exchange Points (IXPs), data centers, and other interconnection facilities, and is the first stop in making interconnection decisions.

Almost one third of the critical default-free zone ASNs at least partially register their interconnection options in the database. The database shows the colocation facilities in which networks have a presence and the IXPs they peer at.

While PeeringDB's database contains user contributed data, networks can give permission for exchanges using the IX-F Member Exchange Format to submit technical information about their presence at an exchange. This can then be used as a source of configuration data.

Traditionally a list of potential peering partners would have been maintained by the host Internet exchange point or colocation centre, but these lists lacked important information such as peering policies and were difficult to keep up-to-date. Being a distributed database, it was also necessary for peers to consult multiple lists in order to establish peering relationships. PeeringDB has become the "first stop when deciding where and whom to peer with".

PeeringDB's software was originally written by Richard Steenbergen in 2004. A non-profit organization was incorporated in 2015 to operate the PeeringDB service. It has four volunteer committees that design, maintain, and promote the service. They are:

- Admin Committee - which is responsible for day-to-day end-user support
- Operations Committee - which oversees the technical infrastructure
- Outreach Committee - which oversees engagement with users and other stakeholders
- Product Committee - which oversees the design and development of product features

PeeringDB's software is open source and volunteers can contribute code. Users are welcome to request features and report bugs by opening an issue on GitHub. They can also engage in discussion using PeeringDB's mailing lists.

== Types of Data ==
PeeringDB hosts five types of data about interconnection:

1. Networks
2. Internet Exchange Points
3. Facilities - often data centers but can be anywhere where networks place equipment for the purpose of interconnection
4. Carriers - providers of high speed Layer 1 and Layer 2 service into a facility
5. Campuses - a collection of facilities operated by the same organization that provide inter-building cross-connects

== Interaction and Access ==
Users can search and update the PeeringDB database using the web interface or an API. The API query for any web search can be copied, formatted for popular tools and languages.

The API can be used to integrate PeeringDB's service into proprietary tools. PeeringDB publishes peeringdb-py as a reference implementation of a local cache of PeeringDB data. Users are encouraged to use peeringdb-py or an equivalent to avoid API query limits.

Users can compare networks' presence in interconnection facilities and IXPs.

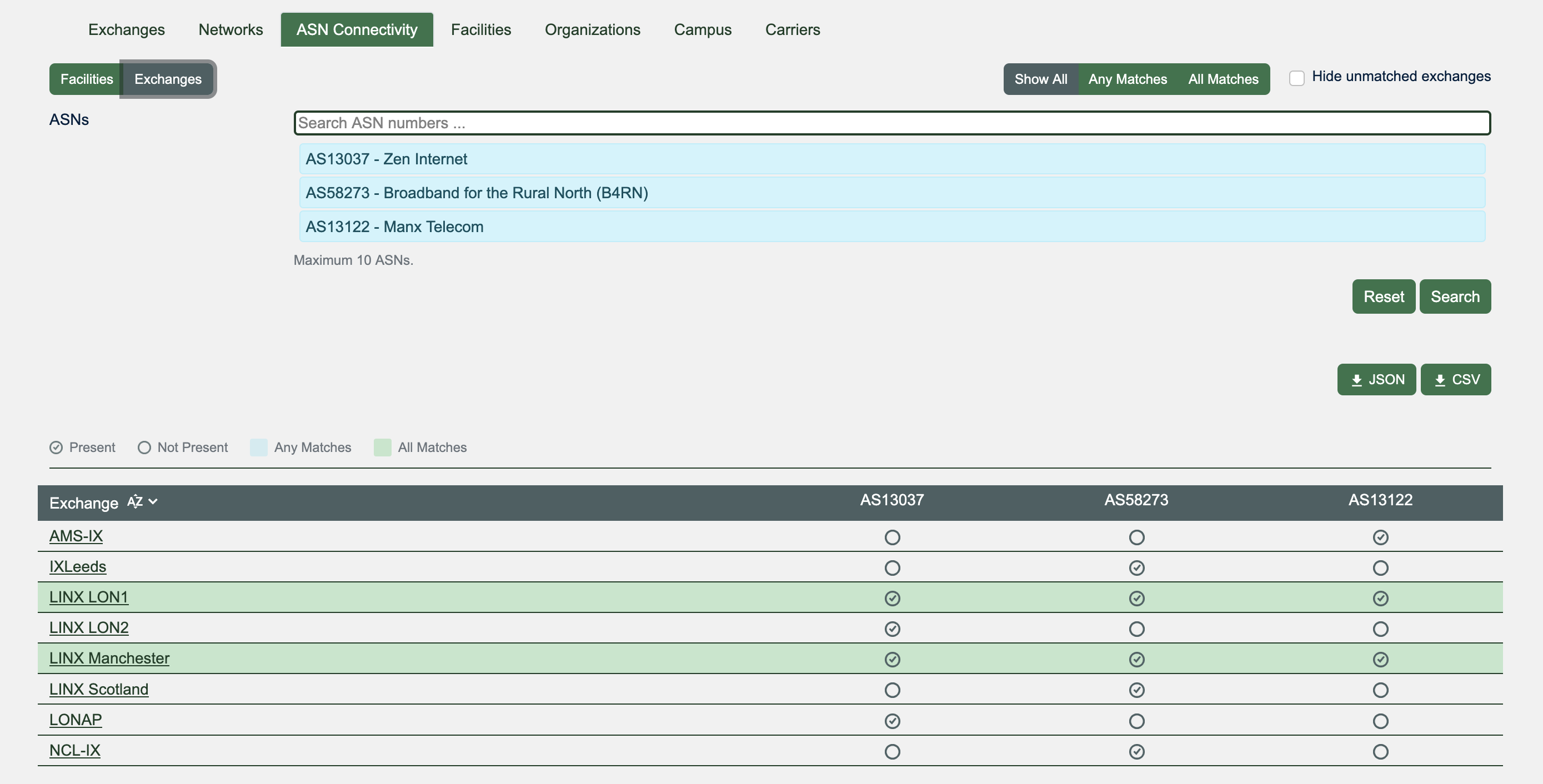
PeeringDB ASN Comparison at IXPs

PeeringDB also publishes a .KMZ formatted dataset of interconnection facilities for which it has coordinates.

When searching PeeringDB, users only need an account if they want access to contact information for organizations.

PeeringDB's OAuth service can be used to authenticate when using third-party applications. About 150 applications had enabled PeeringDB OAuth in May 2021.

== Governance ==
Membership depends on two factors: an active PeeringDB.com account and an individual representative who is subscribed to the governance mailing list. Each member has a single vote in annual elections to appoint board members. Directors are elected for two year terms and are not compensated for their service.

== Funding ==
PeeringDB is supported entirely through sponsorships. Many sponsors are large network operators, data center operators, or Internet Exchange Points. Its finances are published on its documentation site. Its gross revenue in 2025 was just over $317,000.

== See also ==
- Colocation centre
- Content delivery network
- Data center
- Internet Exchange Point
- Internet service provider
