= Telehouse Internet Exchange =

Neutral internet exchange in the German-speaking part of Switzerland

The Telehouse Internet Exchange, or TIX, started in late 1999, is a neutral internet exchange in the German-speaking part of Switzerland. By 2000, TIX had outgrown the two Catalyst 2924XL Ethernet switches, which were replaced with a Foundry BigIron 8000 Gigabit Ethernet switch capable of switching 250 gigabits per second.

TIX was part of IXEurope, which was acquired by Equinix on 28 June 2007. The brand name 'TIX' is no longer in use, while the internet exchange is still operated by Equinix in Zurich and Geneva. Equinix also operates the CERN Internet Exchange Point in Geneva.
