= Latin American and Caribbean Internet Exchange Association =

- Full name: Latin American and Caribbean Internet Exchange Association
- Abbreviation: LAC-IX
- Location: Uruguay
- Website: www.lac-ix.org
- Ports: N/a
- Peak: N/a
- Peak in: N/a
- Peak out: N/a
- Daily (avg.): N/a
- Daily in (avg.): N/a
- Daily out (avg.): N/a

LAC-IX is an association of Internet exchange points in Latin American and the Caribbean. LAC-IX is also a part of the global IX-F Internet eXchange Federation.

== See also ==
- List of Internet exchange points
