= Netnod =

Internet exchange point in Sweden

- Netnod AB
- Formation: October 8, 1996; 29 years ago
- Type: Subsidiary
- VAT ID no.: 556534-0014
- Location: Stockholm, Sweden
- Services: Root name server, Internet exchange points
- CEO: Karin Ahl
- Parent organization: Stiftelsen för Telematikens utveckling (TU-stiftelsen)
- Website: netnod.se
- ASN: 8674

Netnod AB (previously Netnod Internet Exchange i Sverige AB) is a private limited company based in Stockholm, Sweden, that operates Internet exchange points (IXes) and manages one of the thirteen root name servers for the Domain Name System (DNS). It also distributes the official Swedish time through Network Time Protocol (NTP). It is a wholly owned subsidiary of the nonprofit Stiftelsen för Telematikens utveckling (Foundation for the Development of Telematics), or TU-stiftelsen (TU Foundation).

== History ==
The predecessor to the TU Foundation and Netnod was D-GIX, an IX that was established at the Royal Institute of Technology (KTH) in Stockholm and operated by KTHNOC. D-GIX had been one of the first IXes established in Europe, and quite successful at that. In 1996 a report by a committee, (Swedish: Internetutredningen) had listed infrastructure that was critical for the operation of the Internet in Sweden. Among the critical infrastructure listed was a robust and reliable Internet exchange. A number of factors led KTH as well as the Swedish Internet service providers (ISPs) to conclude that a separate legal entity would be a better operational format. After legal consultations, and seeing that the Swedish government seemed keen to play a role in the infrastructure operations, the Swedish ISPs decided to found the TU Foundation. The initial capital came from a government set up foundation, the Foundation for Knowledge and Capacity Building,, one of the largest Swedish research foundations. The idea behind the foundation ownership model was to guarantee independence from both the operators as well as the government. Linkage to the operational community comes from the fact that the Swedish university network SUNET appoints one of the board members, and the Swedish Network Users Society (SNUS) one of the Netnod board members. These two directly appointed board members jointly appoints the third board member.

The TU Foundation established the operational company Netnod to run the IXes. Initially Netnod had no staff of its own and all operations were outsourced to the Swedish Armed Forces. In 2001 Netnod created a wholly owned subsidiary called Autonomica, which was to handle the operations for Netnod. This included running the i.root-servers.net on behalf of NORDUnet and conducting Internet-related research. For a start, staff mainly focused on DNS as well as management, and operations continued to be outsourced to the Armed Forces. However, in 2002, Autonomica's staff grew considerably and outsourcing was ended. Since the integration of Autonomica into Netnod in 2010, operations are handled entirely by Netnod staff.

== Internet exchange points ==
The Netnod IX has among the highest amount of traffic per peer in Europe and is fully enabled for IPv6 traffic. Netnod operates six IXes in five different cities where ISPs can connect and exchange traffic (peer) with one another. They are located in Stockholm, Gothenburg, Luleå, Malmö, as well as Copenhagen in Denmark. It also distributes the official Swedish time through NTP, optionally with the security extension Network Time Security (NTS).

At the Netnod IXes, Netnod provides a variety of value-adding services such as the RIPE Internet Routing Registry (IRR), Bredbandskollen (a consumer broadband speed test), slave services for several DNS TLDs, the DNS root server i.root-servers.net. These services are provided as part of Netnod's AS number AS8674. Netnod also manages a variety of DNS services. Netnod provides anycast and unicast slave service to TLDs worldwide through its DNSNODE product. Some of the services above were previously offered through Autonomica, a fully owned subsidiary of Netnod; in 2010, however Autonomica merged with Netnod.

From the beginning, as was cited in the Internetutredningen report, the IX operated by Netnod was considered as critical national infrastructure. Netnod therefore in 1997 agreed with the Swedish telecommunications regulator to locate the IX equipment in government operated secure telecommunications bunkers. In addition, it was agreed that operations should not be dependent on Stockholm alone. Netnod therefore established IXes in Stockholm, Gothenburg, Malmö, and Sundsvall. All of these locations were in government bunkers, as opposed to co-location facilities as is the case in most other countries. The exchanges are independent and not linked, so operators connected in one city will only see other operators connected in the same city. However, most of the larger Swedish providers are connected at all four cities. Netnod since 2004 also operates an IX in Luleå.

== Autonomica ==
Autonomica AB was a wholly owned subsidiary of Netnod that operated several critical infrastructure pieces on the Internet. Autonomica is currently (in 2022), in a legal sense, a brand of Netnod AB since the merger of the two previously separate organisations.

Autonomica was founded in 1998, as a Netnod subsidiary. The Swedish Operator Forum had been discussing extending the operations of Netnod to include common infrastructure services, as well as taking on staff. It was decided that Netnod would form a separate entity for the operation of the Internet Exchange Point and that that would also be chartered to do research in Internet Technology with a main focus on DNS. Autonomica was set up with three staff, one responsible for co-ordination of the operation of the IXes and two that were moved from the Royal Institute of Technology in Stockholm. It was also agreed between the Swedish University Network SUNET, and Autonomica that Autonomica would take over the responsibility for running the . In addition to that, Autonomica was also to operate the .SE slave servers at each of the four original Netnod Exchanges. Financial surplus was to be handed to the foundation to be used as grants for "good for the Internet" projects.

Autonomica was originally to focus on "research". The work came to focus on what can best be described as engineering and applied research, as often is the case with Internet-related technology, such as the work in the IETF. Autonomica staff has since the start been very active in the IETF and among other things co-chaired the IETF DNSOP working group, multi6 working group (now closed), shim6 working group and the v6ops working group. Autonomica staff has also served on the IAB. The work done by Autonomica has mainly focused on DNSSEC and Autonomica staff has written many Internet Drafts and RFCs on DNSSEC issues and deployability. Recently a lot of work and presentations has been done on the topic of deploying IPv6 in production environment.

Autonomica staff are also frequently involved in presenting and chairing sessions in operational conferences such as RIPE, APRICOT /APNIC, SANOG, MENOG and NANOG. Autonomica has also helped run several workshops and initiatives among the Swedish Operators.

Autonomica provides several for free services for the good of the Internet, such as i.root-servers.net, one of the 13 Root-servers, and NTP servers tied to UTC. Autonomica also finances its operation by sharing the platform used for Anycast of the i.root-servers.net with several TLDs that make use of the platform.

== Technology ==
The first D-GIX was a 10 Mbit/s switch. By the time D-GIX was replaced by Netnod, the exchange point consisted of two FDDI switches in Stockholm and one was also installed in Gothenburg. Around 1998, the FDDI circuits were filled and traffic was heavily impacted by head-of-line blocking. At a Swedish Operator Forum meeting the alternatives were discussed. The options were basically two. The new Gigabit Ethernet standard, and a standard developed by Cisco called Spatial Reuse Protocol (SRP). The decision to go with SRP was basically based on the fact that at the time Gigabit Ethernet and SRP had roughly the same cost. SRP also did not have the issue of head-of-line blocking, and SRP had a larger MTU size than what Gigabit Ethernet had at the time. So the Swedish operators decided that Netnod should implement SRP. The SRP rings installed were running at 2x622 Mbit/s in each city.

It wasn't soon until the 2x622 Mbit/s was not enough. Netnod then proposed to the operators to migrate to SRP 2x2.5 Gbit/s, which was also installed. The larger operators all moved to the new SRP rings, but the smaller operators wanted a cheaper method. By 2000, Gigabit Ethernet was starting to become mass-market and the price had dropped compared to SRP. Gigabit Ethernet had by then also implemented jumbo frames. Netnod said they were willing to implement Gigabit Ethernet, but wanted eight operators to promise to sign up to cover the costs. In the meantime, some operators went off and created an alternative, Ethernet-based IX, SOL-IX. However, Netnod managed to get their eight customers quite fast and built out Gigabit Ethernet at all cities. For 2 years, the old FDDI exchange (that was still operational) was connected to the Ethernet switches, but by the end of 2002, all SRP and FDDI equipment had been migrated away from.

Today the Netnod platform consists of single-chassis Gigabit Ethernet switches at each location.

As of 2012 Netnod also offers remote peering through a reseller program, Netnod Reach.

== See also ==
- List of Internet exchange points
