= IXLeeds =

Internet exchange point in the United Kingdom

- Founded: 2008
- Location: United Kingdom, Leeds
- Website: www.IXLeeds.net
- Members: 24 as of December 2023
- Daily (avg.): 10.7 Gbps

IXLeeds is a Leeds-based internet exchange point (IXP) founded in 2008. It is the UK's only fully independent exchange outside London, and has 20 members.

The exchange was founded as a neutral not-for-profit by a group of telecommunications and internet service provider (ISP) professionals including Professor Adam Beaumont, founder and CEO of telecoms operator aql. Beaumont created the first carrier-neutral data centre in Leeds which allowed multiple operators to interconnect and facilitated the existence of the exchange. aql has provided free space and power for the exchange since its inception.

IXLeeds promotes cooperation between operators in the region to help improve digital infrastructure and support a solid internet exchange fabric.

It is located in one of aql's data centres in the historic Salem Chapel in Leeds.

== See also ==
- List of internet exchange points
