= France-IX =

Internet exchange point in France

- Full name: France-IX
- Abbreviation: France-IX
- Founded: June 2010
- Location: Paris, Marseille, Lyon, Grenoble, Lille, Toulouse, Bordeaux
- Website: www.franceix.net
- Members: over 600 as of June 2026
- Peak: 3.5 Tbit/s as of June 2026

France-IX is a French Internet exchange point (IXP) founded in June 2010. It enables connected networks — operators, content providers, hosting companies and enterprises — to exchange their traffic directly through peering. as of June 2026 more than 600 networks are members, making it the largest IXP in France by number of connected networks, with peak traffic of around 3.5 Tbit/s.

France-IX operates points of presence in Paris, Marseille, Lyon, Grenoble, Lille, Toulouse and Bordeaux. Besides peering, it offers private interconnection, IP transit, cloud access and hosting services.

== History ==
France-IX was initially discussed by Raphael Maunier (then with Neo Telecoms) and Maurice Dean (then working for Google) in 2008 in Dublin. The project of setting up the internet exchange, initially called PhoenIX, was launched in December 2008. Christian Kaufmann (working for Akamai) and Nicolas Strina (then working for Jaguar Network) soon joined the initiative. The working group obtained the official financial and logistical support of Jaguar Network, Google, Akamai, Interxion and Neo Telecoms and was renamed France-IX. The project was first presented internationally during RIPE 59 in Lisbon.

France-IX opened in Paris in 2010 and later expanded to Marseille. In January 2021 it merged with the Lyon-based association Rezopole, which operated the Lyonix (Lyon) and GrenoblIX (Grenoble) exchange points. It subsequently expanded to Lille (2022), Toulouse (2023, succeeding the former TouIX) and Bordeaux, whose exchange point opened on 2 April 2025.

== Organisation ==
France-IX is operated by France IX Services, a commercial company in charge of the exchange's day-to-day operations and wholly owned by the non-profit association FRNIX.

This association-based model is presented as a guarantee of neutrality and continuity: with no shareholders to remunerate, revenue is reinvested in the infrastructure, and the exchange is not intended to be sold to an operator or data-centre, which limits conflicts of interest.

France-IX is led by Franck Simon. Its board of directors is elected by the association and was last renewed in 2026. The company employs 33 staff as of 2026.

== Network ==
as of June 2026 France-IX operates six exchange points across 22 points of presence, with an installed capacity of 35 Tbit/s and peak traffic of around 3.5 Tbit/s.

France-IX describes itself as a neutral exchange, independent of operators and data-centre operators. It also operates a second, independent peering platform called Peering Essentiel, decorrelated from its historical platform; France-IX states that it is the only French IXP to offer such an architecture, intended to provide resilience through decorrelation rather than mere redundancy.

Its points of presence are located in:

- Paris: Telehouse Paris 2 (Léon Frot), Telehouse Paris 3 (Magny-les-Hameaux), Equinix PA6 (Aubervilliers), Equinix PA7 (Saint-Denis), Digital Realty PAR2 (Aubervilliers), Digital Realty PAR5 (Saint-Denis), OPCORE DC2 and DC3 (Vitry-sur-Seine), DATA4 PAR1 (Marcoussis)
- Marseille: Digital Realty MRS1/2/3/4, Free Pro (Jaguar Network) MRS1
- Lyon and Grenoble: UltraEdge Lyon-Vénissieux, ETIX Lyon, Free Pro Limonest, CC IN2P3 (Villeurbanne), Cogent and Orange Business "La Fabrique" (Grenoble)
- Lille: ETIX Lille (Sainghin-en-Mélantois)
- Toulouse: Eurofiber TLS00
- Bordeaux: Equinix BX1

== Ports of connection ==
Connections are available on Ethernet fibre ports of 1, 10, 100 and 400 Gbit/s, with several bandwidth options on each port.

== Services ==
France-IX offers the following services:

- Public peering (unicast and multicast IPv4, unicast IPv6) with route servers
- Remote peering and the Multipass service, providing access to all France-IX cities from a single port
- Cloud peering programmes such as the Microsoft Azure Peering Service (MAPS) and Google VPP
- Direct interconnection with cloud providers, including Outscale and Scaleway
- Private interconnection (PNI VLAN, PNI WAVE)
- IP transit, provided through partners and resellers
- Hosting services
- A 24/7 network operations centre

These services can be subscribed directly with France-IX or through its online marketplace.

== Community ==
The France-IX community comes from all around the world. Any organisation owning an Autonomous System Number (ASN) can connect to France-IX. Connected members have various profiles, including operators and internet access providers, content delivery networks, hosting companies, cloud providers, online media, corporations, DNS operators and search engines.

== Partners ==
To foster the exchange of internet traffic in France and Europe, France-IX has established interconnections with other internet exchange points, including LU-CIX (Luxembourg), TOP-IX (Turin, Italy) and ESpanix (Madrid, Spain). The Lyonix, GrenoblIX and TouIX exchanges, previously interconnected with France-IX, are now part of its network.

France-IX also operates a reseller programme, launched in 2012.

== See also ==
- List of Internet exchange points
