= InterLAN =

Internet exchange point in Romania

- Full name: InterLAN Internet Exchange
- Abbreviation: InterLAN-IX
- Founded: 2005
- Location: Bucharest, Romania
- Website: www.interlan.ro
- Members: 152
- Ports: 1 Gbps, 10 Gbps, 40 Gbps, 100 Gbps, 400 Gbps
- Peers: 124
- Peak: 5 Tbps
- Peak in: 4 Tbps
- Peak out: 5 Tbps
- Daily (avg.): 802 Gbps
- Daily in (avg.): 637 Tbps
- Daily out (avg.): 600 Gbps

InterLAN Internet Exchange (InterLAN-IX) is a neutral, distributed Internet exchange point (IXP) that serves as the largest interconnection platform in Romania. It is operated by the Interlan Association, a nonprofit organization of Romanian Internet service providers (ISPs) and is headquartered in Bucharest.

The Interlan Association has over 50 member companies ensuring that the Internet exchange point remains neutral, with any surplus reinvested into network infrastructure and service development. The exchange is an active participant in the European IXP community through its membership in European Internet Exchange Association (Euro-IX) and in the RIPE NCC. It also helps organise the Romanian Network Operators Group and regularly participates in international peering events such as the UAE-IX Peering Workshop and Euro-IX Peering Days.

== History ==
The InterLAN-IX was founded in 2005. From its inception, the exchange was designed as a neutral, community‑driven platform to enable local peering and reduce dependency on expensive internet transit links. In 2007, the InterLAN Association formalised its corporate governance, and the exchange became fully operational as a nonprofit organization.

InterLAN-IX joined the European Internet Exchange Association (Euro-IX) as a full member in 2008 and became a member of the RIPE NCC in 2015, underscoring its commitment to industry best practices and the responsible management of Internet number resources. Over the following decade, the exchange expanded its geographic footprint, adding points of presence (PoPs) in Bucharest, Arad, Cluj-Napoca, Constanța, Craiova, Gheorgheni, Iași, Sibiu, Suceava, Târgu Secuiesc, Timișoara and, later, Frankfurt and Sofia.

In 2025, the IXP deployed a new anycast root name server M-Root instance, becoming one of the few IXPs to host multiple root server instances (D‑Root, E‑Root, F‑Root, K‑Root, L‑Root and M‑Root). It also established a new international point of presence in Sofia, Bulgaria in January 2025, and in March 2025 it began hosting a BGP Route Views collector in partnership with the University of Oregon.

== POP's ==
Interlan has several POP's in Romania and one in Frankfurt, Germany:

- NXDATA-1, 8, Dimitrie Pompeiu Blvd., Feper building, 3rd floor, Bucharest, 2nd district, Romania
- NXDATA-2, 6-A, Dimitrie Pompeiu Blvd., IEMI Building, ground floor, Bucharest, 2nd district, Romania
- Drumul Taberei area, Bucharest, 2nd district, Romania
- Constanta, Romania
- Timișoara, Romania
- Craiova, Romania
- Equinix Frankfurt KleyerStrasse (FR5), Kleyerstrasse 90, Frankfurt 60326, Germany

== Available ports ==
Available ports are:

- 100 Mbit/s copper
- 1 Gbit/s copper/fiber
- 10 Gbit/s fiber

One or more ports can be aggregated, for example two ports x 1 Gbit/s

== Participants ==
Interlan has 62 traffic participants:

| Nr. | Name | Country | AS # | Port speed | IPv6 |
|---|---|---|---|---|---|
| 1. | ABC Technologies | Romania | 35512 | 1G | |
| 2. | Akamai Technologies | United States | 20940 | 40G | yes |
| 3. | Allnet Telecom | Romania | 20722 | 1G | |
| 4. | Almsoft Computers | Romania | 31554 | 1G | yes |
| 5. | Ambra | Romania | 34630 | 1G | |
| 6. | ANCOM | Romania | 28727 | 10G | |
| 7. | Balkan Internet Exchange | Bulgaria | 49401 | 10G | |
| 8. | Bensoft Telecom | Romania | 40984 | 1G | |
| 9. | Bestnet Service | Romania | 28684 | 1G | yes |
| 10. | Canal S | Romania | 31605 | 2G | |
| 11. | CloudFlare | United States | 13335 | 10G | yes |
| 12. | Combridge | Romania | 5483 | 10G | |
| 13. | Computer Wired | Romania | 39669 | 1G | |
| 14. | D-Net Communications Services | Romania | 202203 | 100M | |
| 15. | Digital Construction Network | Romania | 34916 | 1G | |
| 16. | Direct One | Romania | 49909 | 2G | yes |
| 17. | Distinct New Media | Romania | 48067 | 1G | |
| 18. | Docler Holding | Luxembourg | 34655 | 1G | |
| 19. | Dynamic Connection | Romania | 35512 | 1G | |
| 20. | Energy Dot | Romania | 48948 | 1G | |
| 21. | Euroweb Romania | Romania | 6663 | 10G | yes |
| 22. | GMB Computers | Romania | 31017 | 1G | |
| 23. | Google | United States | 15169 | 20G | yes |
| 24. | Hurricane Electric | United States | 6939 | 10G | yes |
| 25. | ICI-ROTLD | Romania | 3233 | 100M | yes |
| 26. | Ines Group | Romania | 12310 | 1G | yes |
| 27. | Infinity Telecom | Romania | 56654 | 1G | yes |
| 28. | Internet Oltenia | Romania | 12842 | 1G | |
| 29. | M247 Europe | Romania | 9009 | 20G | yes |
| 30. | Massive Telecom | Romania | 35267 | 1G | |
| 31. | Microsoft | United States | 8075 | 10G | yes |
| 32. | Millennium IT | Romania | 35584 | 2G | yes |
| 33. | Moldtelecom | Moldova | 8926 | 10G | yes |
| 34. | NetIX Communications | Bulgaria | 57463 | 10G | |
| 35. | Nextgen Communications | Romania | 35002 | 2G | yes |
| 36. | OpenDNS | United States | 36692 | 100M | yes |
| 37. | Orange Romania | Romania | 8953 | 30G | yes |
| 38. | Phoenix IT | Romania | 21368 | 100M | yes |
| 39. | Phoenix Telecom & Media Services | Romania | 33823 | 2G | yes |
| 40. | Pixel View | Romania | 50244 | 2G | |
| 41. | Platinum Star TV | Romania | 42523 | 1G | |
| 42. | Prime Telecom | Romania | 39737 | 10G | yes |
| 43. | Pronet Solutii IT | Romania | 35505 | 2G | |
| 44. | RNT | Romania | 34723 | 10G | |
| 45. | RoEDUnet | Romania | 2614 | 10G | yes |
| 46. | Sanos Consulting International | Romania | 39391 | 1G | |
| 47. | Serbia Broadband | Serbia | 31042 | 10G | yes |
| 48. | Serviciul de Telecomunicații Speciale | Romania | 31313 | 10G | yes |
| 49. | Softkit | Romania | 35371 | 1G | |
| 50. | Starnet | Moldova | 31252 | 10G | yes |
| 51. | Novatel | Bulgaria | 41059 | 1G | yes |
| 52. | Teen Telecom | Romania | 34304 | 1G | yes |
| 53. | Telekom Romania | Romania | 9050 | 10G | yes |
| 54. | Teletrans | Romania | 34279 | 1G | yes |
| 55. | Tennet Telecom | Romania | 39543 | 10G | yes |
| 56. | Tier Datacenter | Romania | 50515 | 100M | |
| 57. | Trabia Network | Hong Kong | 43289 | 10G | yes |
| 58. | Univers Net Com | Romania | 47742 | 1G | |
| 59. | Verisign | Netherlands | 26415 | 1G | yes |
| 60. | Viva Telecom | Romania | 57136 | 1G | |
| 61. | Voxility | Romania | 39743 | 10G | |
| 62. | Worldnet Data Communication | Romania | 34450 | 1G | |

DNS root servers

- J-root Verisign
