= Norwegian Internet Exchange =

Internet exchange point in Norway

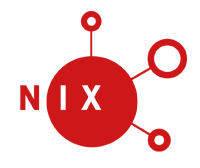
- Full name: Norwegian Internet Exchange
- Abbreviation: NIX
- Founded: 1993
- Location: Norway
- Website: nix.no

The Norwegian Internet Exchange or NIX is an Internet exchange with presence in Tromsø, Trondheim, Bergen, Stavanger and Oslo, Norway. NIX is owned and operated by the IT Department (), at the University of Oslo. Companies connected to the NIX are most Internet service providers operating in Norway, in addition to Amazon and the two largest Norwegian broadcasting companies, NRK and TV2. NIX has a neutral pricing model.

NIX1 is the primary site for the Norwegian Internet Exchange. NIX1 is colocated at three sites in Oslo.

NIX2 is the primary site for redundancy located at Kristian Augusts gate 17 in downtown Oslo.

The remaining four sites are regional sites intended for local use.

- BIX in Bergen
- TRDIX in Trondheim
- TIX in Tromsø
- SIX in Stavanger

The term NIX refers to all of the six IXPs. All six IXPs are isolated, without any physical or logical interconnections.
