= Berlin Commercial Internet Exchange =

Internet exchange point in Germany

- Abbreviation: BCIX
- Founded: 2002
- Location: Berlin, Germany
- Website: www.bcix.de
- Members: 79 As of January 2024
- Ports: 186
- Peers: 135
- Peak: 1.3 Tbits/s As of April 2024 "BCIX: Bandwidth Statistics".

Berlin Commercial Internet Exchange (BCIX) is a Berlin-based Internet exchange point (IXP) founded in 2002 as a membership organisation and currently has 79 members, making it one of the largest regional IXP in Germany by membership. BCIX currently operates an Arista Networks and Dell Force10-based infrastructure with DWDM links between eleven sites:

1. NTT (formerly e-shelter), Nonnendammallee 15, 13599 Berlin
2. I/P/B/, Luetzowstrasse 105/106, 10785 Berlin
3. DNS:NET, Luetzowstrasse 105/106, 10785 Berlin
4. I/P/B/, Kitzingstrasse 15, 12277 Berlin
5. euNetworks, Alboinstr. 36, 12103 Berlin
6. Speedbone, Alboinstrasse 36, 12103 Berlin
7. Lumen (formerly CenturyLink, Level(3)), Gradestrasse 60, 12347 Berlin
8. AtlasEdge formerly Colt Datacenter, Wiebestrasse 46-49, 10553 Berlin
9. 3U Telecom, Lorenzweg 5, 12099 Berlin
10. NTT BER2, Lankwitzer Straße 45-47, 12105 Berlin
11. PŸUR HL komm & Penta Infra BER01, Florastraße 133-136, 12623 Berlin
