= Milan Internet eXchange =

Internet exchange point in Italy

- Abbreviation: MIX
- Founded: 2000
- Location: Milan, Italy
- Website: www.mix-it.net
- Members: 357As of February 2022
- Peak: 1808 Gbits/s As of February 2022
- Peak out: 1808 Gbits/s
- Daily out (avg.): 1048 Gbits/s

MIX, the Milan Internet eXchange, is a not-for-profit Milan-based Internet exchange point (IXP) founded in 2000 and currently has 357 members, making it the largest IXP in Italy.
