= List of internet exchange points by size =

This is a list of internet exchange networks by size, measured by peak data rate (throughput), with additional data on location, establishment and average throughput.

Generally only exchanges with more than ten gigabits per second peak throughput have been taken into consideration. The numbers in the list represent switched traffic only (no private interconnects) and are rounded to whole gigabits. Take into consideration that traffic on each exchange point can change quickly, and be seasonal.

This list is not exhaustive, as it includes only exchanges willing to make traffic data public on their website. Particularly data of IXPs from the United States and China is hard to come by. Examples of large peering points without public data are NAP of the Americas or PacketExchange. Neither is it any longer authoritative, as companies aggregate their data capacity. For example, as of 2024, the top two entries each contained data for about 40 separate locations, in one case on four different continents.

== Table ==
Short name	Name	City	Country	Established	Members	Maximum throughput (Gbit/s)	Average throughput (Gbit/s)	Values updated
IX.br	Brazil Internet Exchange	36 cities: Aracaju, Belém, Belo Horizonte, Boa Vista, Brasília, Cascavel, Campina Grande, Campinas, Campo Grande, Caruaru, Caxias do Sul, Cuiabá, Curitiba, Feira de Santana, Florianópolis, Fortaleza, Foz do Iguacu, Goiânia, João Pessoa, Lajeado, Londrina, Maceio, Manaus, Maringá, Natal, Palmas, Porto Alegre, Porto Velho, Recife, Rio Branco, Rio de Janeiro, Salvador, Santa Maria, São José dos Campos, São José do Rio Preto, São Luis, São Paulo, Teresina, Vitória	Brazil	2004	3,900 (Note: Total across all locations.)	45,790	28,020	15 January 2026
DE-CIX	Deutscher Commercial Internet Exchange	38 cities: Frankfurt, Hamburg, Munich, Düsseldorf, Leipzig, Berlin, Chicago, Dallas, New York City, Phoenix, Richmond, Dubai (as UAE-IX), Chennai, Delhi, Kolkata, Mumbai, Palermo, Marseille, Istanbul, Dallas, Barcelona, Madrid, Lisbon, Mumbai (as Mumbai IX), Athens, Bandar Seri Begawan, Sofia (as BIX.BG), Prague (as NIX.CZ), Aqaba (as Aqaba IX), Johor Bahru, Kuala Lumpur, Lagos, Manila, Warsaw, Bucharest, Moscow, Saint Petersburg, Singapore	19 countries: Germany, USA, United Arab Emirates, Italy, France, Turkey, Spain, Portugal, India, Greece, Brunei, Jordan, Malaysia, Nigeria, Philippines, Poland, Romania, Russia, Singapore	1995	1,104 (Note: Frankfurt only.)	26,990	19,500 (Note: Average across the last year.)	26 March 2026
Equinix	Equinix Exchange	35 cities: Paris, Zurich, New York (Secaucus, NJ and New York City), Washington, D.C. (Ashburn, VA), Washington, D.C. (Vienna, VA), Chicago, Dallas, Los Angeles, Silicon Valley (Palo Alto, CA), Silicon Valley (San Jose, CA), Tokyo, Hong Kong, Singapore, Sydney, Rio de Janeiro, São Paulo, Bogotá, Madrid, Barcelona, Lisbon, Geneva, Stockholm, Helsinki, Warsaw, London, Manchester, Dublin, Amsterdam, Frankfurt, Milan, Seoul, Osaka, Melbourne, Perth, Canberra	20 countries: USA, Europe, Japan, Singapore, Hong Kong, Australia, Brazil, Switzerland, Finland, Sweden, Spain, Poland, Colombia, United Kingdom, Ireland, South Korea, Germany, Portugal, Netherlands, Italy	1998	1800	19,600	9,900	5 August 2020
PIT Chile	PIT Chile	4 cities: Santiago, Arica, Concepcion, Temuco	Chile	2016	162	15,100	8,500	24 January 2024
DATAIX	DATA-IX	13 cities: Amsterdam, Stockholm, Copenhagen, Vaggeryd, Frankfurt, Helsinki, Moscow, Saint Petersburg, Rostov-on-Don, Nur-Sultan, Kharkiv, Kyiv, Odesa	8 countries: Netherlands, Germany, Sweden, Denmark, Finland, Russia, Ukraine, Kazakhstan	2009	608	14,400	–	24 October 2026
AMS-IX	Amsterdam Internet Exchange	12 cities: Amsterdam, Haarlem, Schiphol-Rijk, Rotterdam, Naaldwijk, Willemstad, Hong Kong, New York City, Chicago, San Francisco Bay Area, Mumbai, Kolkata	Netherlands, Curaçao, Hong Kong, USA, India	1997 (Note: AMS-IX was established unofficially in 1994.)	882 (Note: Location in Amsterdam only.)	12,075	8,346	5 April 2023
MSK-IX	MSK-IX	10 cities: Moscow, Saint Petersburg, Novosibirsk, Rostov-on-Don, Stavropol, Samara, Kazan, Yekaterinburg, Vladivostok, Riga	Russia, Latvia	1995	556	9,408	5,212	24 October 2026
JPNAP	Japan Network Access Point	5 cities: Tokyo, Osaka, Fukuoka, Sendai, Sapporo	Japan	2001	337	8,160	6,140	26 September 2024
NL-ix	NL-ix	Various cities	7 countries: Belgium, Denmark, France, Germany, Luxembourg, Netherlands, United Kingdom	2002	661	7,980	2,410	2 February 2024
NetIX	NetIX	29 cities: Frankfurt, Amsterdam, Paris, London, Miami, New York, Ashburn, Hong Kong, São Paulo, Rio de Janeiro, Fortaleza, Marseille, Madrid, Milan, Moscow, Stockholm, Vienna, Prague, Zagreb, Warsaw, Belgrade, Sofia, Bucharest, Kyiv, Istanbul, Athens, Thessaloniki, Zagreb, Singapore	24 countries: Germany, Netherlands, France, United Kingdom, United States, Brazil, China, Singapore, Spain, Italy, Russia, Sweden, Austria, Czech Republic, Croatia, Poland, Serbia, Bulgaria, Romania, Ukraine, Turkey, Greece, Croatia, EU	2013	250	8,290	6,210	27 October 2026
LINX	London Internet Exchange	5 cities: London, Manchester, Edinburgh, Cardiff, Northern Virginia	United Kingdom, USA	1994	965	5,820	4,170	17 January 2021
NAPAFRICA-IX	NAP Africa Johannesburg	Johannesburg, Cape Town, Durban	South Africa	2012	690	7,340	7,340	18 November 2026
SIX	Seattle Internet Exchange	Seattle, Minneapolis, North Kansas City	USA	1997	368	3,700	2,190	21 April 2026
France-IX	France-IX	Paris, Marseille, Lyon, Grenoble, Bordeaux, Lille, Toulouse	France	2010	701	3,420	2,390	12 December 2025
SGIX	Singapore Internet Exchange	Singapore	Singapore	2009	263	3,290	2,250	28 June 2024
NIX.CZ	Neutral Internet Exchange of the Czech Republic	Prague, Bratislava	Czech Republic	1996	216	3,200	1,530	1 August 2025
HKIX	Hong Kong Internet eXchange	Hong Kong	Hong Kong	1995	351	3,045	1,690	27 July 2023
1-ix	Distribut Internet exchange point	Frankfurt, Amsterdam, Warsaw, Prague, Bratislava, London, Kyiv	Europe	2022	200+	3.000	2.200	16 September 2024
MIX	Milan Internet eXchange	Milan	Italy	2000	359	2,991	1,782	20 January 2025
DTEL-IX	Digital Telecom Internet eXchange	Kyiv	Ukraine	2009	268	2,570	2,000	31 March 2026
Mumbai IX	Mumbai Internet Exchange	Navi Mumbai	India	2014	184	2450	—N/a	25 March 2020
Netnod	Netnod Internet Exchange in Sweden	Stockholm, Copenhagen, Sundsvall, Gothenburg, Luleå	Sweden, Denmark	1997	269	2,277	1,712	31 March 2020
TorIX	The Toronto Internet Exchange	Toronto	Canada	1998	311	1,900	1410	9 April 2024
Giganet	Giganet	Kyiv, Odesa, Kharkiv, Moscow, Warsaw	Ukraine, Russia, Poland	2012	158	1,830	1,070	25 March 2020
EPIX	Poland Internet Exchange	Katowice, Warsaw, Poznań	Poland	2012	400 (Katowice), 375 (Warsaw), 25 (Poznań) ref	1,750	1,000	15 October 2020
BIX	Budapest Internet Exchange	Budapest	Hungary	1997	78	1,700	250	7 February 2021
SwissIX	Swiss Internet eXchange	Zurich	Switzerland	2001	235	1540	220	25 March 2020
VIX	Vienna Internet eXchange	Vienna	Austria	1996	170	1,430	861	3 December 2023
SIX	Slovak Internet eXchange	Bratislava and Košice	Slovakia	1996	70	1383	682	13 October 2026
NIX.SK	Neutral Internet eXchange	Bratislava	Slovakia	2014	53	1276.9	700	25 March 2020
IXPN	Internet Exchange Point of Nigeria	Lagos, Port Harcourt, Abuja, Kano, Enugu	Nigeria	2006	115	1200	1000	11 April 2023
MICE	Midwest Internet Cooperative Exchange	Minneapolis, MN	USA	2011	113	1,160	—N/a	4 March 2020
NYIIX	New York International Internet Exchange point	New York City, Seacaucus, Newark, Los Angeles, Philadelphia	USA	1996	299	1040	738	24 June 2021
DET-IX	Detroit Internet Exchange	Detroit	USA	2014	64	1035.6	516.5	11 November 2022
FD-IX	Fiber-Data Internet Exchange / MidWest Internet Exchange	Indianapolis	USA	2015	42	1,000	100	24 July 2025
ECIX	European Commercial Internet Exchange	Frankfurt, Düsseldorf, Berlin, Hamburg, Munich	Germany	2002	180	996	500	30 October 2017
BCIX	Berlin Commercial Internet Exchange	Berlin	Germany	2002	152	933	800	04 Octobre 2023
LONAP	London Network Access Point	London	United Kingdom	1997	—N/a	773.3	414.5	23 March 2021
DE-CIX New York	DE-CIX New York	New York City	USA	2013	235	722.05	230.1	25 March 2020
NIXI	National Internet Exchange of India	Mumbai, Delhi, Chennai, Kolkata, Bangalore, Hyderabad, Ahmedabad, Guwahati	India	2003	42	613	204	22 February 2018
NaMEx	Roma Internet Exchange Point	Rome (4 sites), Naples, Bari, Tirana (Albania)	Italy	2004	227	585	383	30 November 2023
GR-IX	Greek Internet Exchange	Athens, Thessaloniki	Greece	2009	60 (Athens), 21 (Thessaloniki)	551	312	3 March 2022
InterLAN	InterLAN Internet Exchange	Bucharest, Constanta, Timișoara, Craiova	Romania	2005	139	519.04 (Note: Data for 24-hour period, could change frequently)	344.33	20 June 2024
Any2	CoreSite Any2 Exchange	Los Angeles, San Jose, Miami, Washington, D.C., Boston, Chicago, Northern Virginia (Reston), New York City, Denver	USA	2005	332	500	100	18 November 2011
INEX	Internet Neutral Exchange	Dublin, Cork	Ireland	1996	113	481	250~	25 March 2020
FICIX	Finnish Communication and Internet Exchange	Espoo, Helsinki, Oulu	Finland	1993	66	387	231	2 August 2026
QIX	The Montreal Internet Exchange	Montreal	Canada	1995 (Note: QIX was established in 1995 by RISQ and was later incorporated in 2013 as a non-profit organization under the name "Échange Internet de Montréal Inc (Montreal Internet Exchange)".)	108	361	269	9 April 2024
Piter-IX	Piter-IX	Saint Petersburg, Moscow, Riga, Frankfurt, Tallinn, Kyiv	Russia, Latvia, Germany, Estonia, Ukraine	2018	284	350	200	24 October 2019
BNIX	Belgium National Internet eXchange	Brussels	Belgium	1995	57	340	—N/a	25 March 2020
Eurasia Peering	Eurasia Peering	Moscow	Russia	2018	161	314	170	6 January 2021
KINX	Korea Internet Neutral eXchange	Seoul	South Korea	2000	44	280	—N/a	14 October 2014
TPIX	Taipei Internet eXchange	Taipei	Taiwan	2002	135	250	130	15 December 2023
STHIX	Stockholm Internet Exchange	Stockholm, Gothenburg, Copenhagen	Sweden, Denmark	2005	195	224	115	25 March 2020
UAE-IX	UAE-IX	Dubai	UAE	2013	82	207.6	160.2	7 November 2020
GigaPix	Gigabit Portuguese Internet eXchange	Lisbon, Porto	Portugal	1995	48	197.49	130.79	10 April 2023
SONIX	Sweden Open Network Internet eXchange	Stockholm, Gothenburg, Malmö	Sweden	2021	80	170	105	13 November 2025
NIX	Norwegian Internet eXchange	Oslo	Norway	1993	63	164	—N/a	25 March 2020
SIX	Slovenian Internet Exchange	Ljubljana	Slovenia	1994	31	160.04	30	25 March 2020
VANIX	Vancouver Internet Exchange	Vancouver	Canada	2015	67	130	—N/a	21 April 2022
CRIX	Punto Neutro de Intercambio de Tráfico de Costa Rica	San José, Costa Rica	Costa Rica	2014	49	120	60	10 February 2022
RoNIX	Romanian Internet Exchange	Bucharest, Cluj-Napoca, Frankfurt	Romania	2001	43	115.06	81.48	1 April 2020
DIX	Danish Internet Exchange Point	Lyngby	Denmark	1994	45	113	—N/a	30 March 2020
KCIX	Kansas City Internet Exchange	Kansas City	USA	2006	99	110	—N/a	25 March 2020
ALP-IX	ALPs Internet Exchange	Munich	Germany	2008	172	54.4	31	25 March 2020
YYCIX	Calgary Internet Exchange	Calgary	Canada	2012	70	52.8	35.3	21 April 2022
Múli-IXP	Múli Internet Exchange Point	Reykjavík	Iceland	2021	6	50	—N/a	16 June 2022
LyonIX	Lyon Internet Exchange Point	LyonIX, Lyon, France	France	2001	102	48.8	24	25 March 2020
RIX	Reykjavik Internet Exchange	Reykjavík	Iceland	1999	24	47.8	12.7	18 February 2021
F4IX	F4 Internet Exchange	Kansas City	USA	2024	87	27	—N/a	26 October 2024
SOX	Singapore Open Exchange	Singapore	Singapore	2001	26	24, approx.	—N/a	20 October 2018
APE	Auckland Peering Exchange	Auckland, New Zealand	New Zealand	1999	84	15.49	10.43	10 June 2022
PIRIX	PIRIX Internet Exchange	Saint Petersburg	Russia	2009	40	15.32	10.2	30 March 2020
Pipe IX	Pipe IX	Sydney	Australia	2002	60+	13	13	?
SFINX	Service for French Internet eXchange	Paris	France	1995	75	12.1	—N/a	25 March 2020
Peering.cz	Peering.cz	Prague, Bratislava, Vienna, Frankfurt	Czech Republic, Slovakia, Austria, Germany	2013	190		3,200, approx.	16 June 2023
LU-CIX	Luxembourg Commercial Internet eXchange	Luxembourg	Luxembourg	2009	34	y	127.3	25 March 2020
Many smaller Internet exchange points

== See also ==
- Autonomous system (internet)
- Border Gateway Protocol
- Internet exchange point
- List of internet exchange points
- Peering
