= Hetzner =

German data center company

Hetzner Online GmbH
- Company type: Gesellschaft mit beschränkter Haftung
- Founded: 1997; 29 years ago
- Headquarters: Gunzenhausen, Bavaria, Germany
- Founder: Martin Hetzner
- Key people: Martin Hetzner (CEO)
- Industry: Web hosting SSL certificates Colocation; Domain registration
- Revenue: €367 million (2021)
- Net income: €103 million (2021)
- Website: hetzner.com
- ASN: 24940

Hetzner Online GmbH is a company and data center operator based in Gunzenhausen, Bavaria, in Germany.

== History ==
Hetzner Online GmbH began operations in Germany in 1997 under the name Hetzner Online Services. Between 2000 and 2015, Hetzner Online in Germany operated under the legal status AG ("Aktiengesellschaft"). In 2015, it changed its legal status to GmbH. In addition, Hetzner Online expanded its chief executive team with Stephan Konvicka and Günther Müller at the beginning of 2019.

The company is named after its founder Martin Hetzner. Hetzner Online owns and operates three data center parks in Nuremberg and Falkenstein (Germany), and Tuusula (Finland). It also rents colocation space in Ashburn, Virginia (United States), and Hillsboro, Oregon (United States). In 2024, Hetzner expanded its global footprint with a new data center in Singapore (Singapore).

In addition, Hetzner Online is a co-investor in the Cinia C-Lion1 project, which connected Helsinki and Rostock, Germany together with a 1,100 km long submarine fiberglass cable. The cable provides a high-speed connection between Hetzner's German and Finnish data centers.

== Services ==
Hetzner Online provides dedicated hosting, shared web hosting, virtual private servers, managed servers, domain names, SSL certificates, storage boxes, and cloud. At the data center parks located in Nuremberg, Falkenstein and Tuusula/Finland, customers can also connect their hardware to Hetzner Online's infrastructure and network with the company's colocation services. The company operates a server auction site online where the chance to rent older dedicated servers (not purchase or colocate) are auctioned off in the form of a Dutch auction. According to W3Techs, Hetzner is used by 2.7% of all websites.

Hetzner Online has a domain name registrar arrangement with ICANN (for registering domains under .com, .net and .org and others), DENIC (for .de), and nic.at (for .at).

== Infrastructure ==
Hetzner Online's datacenter projects are coordinated and implemented in-house with as little outsourcing as possible. Data center units served by multiple redundant uplinks, including 1300 Gbit/s to DE-CIX and fiber optic links to Nuremberg and Frankfurt. Colocation facilities are sited at all data center parks in Nuremberg, Falkenstein (Vogtland) in Germany, and Helsinki in Finland.

In 2021, a datacenter in Ashburn, Virginia, was opened, marking Hetzner's first American server. By 2024, the company took a significant step by opening a datacenter in Singapore, marking Hetzner's first Singaporean server. In March 2025, Hetzner and MHB Montage launched HT Clean Energy, a solar initiative for data centers, marking a significant move toward reducing the carbon footprint of the company's data center operations.

=== Network ===
The backbone is set up in the form of a ring network between the datacenter locations Nuremberg and Falkenstein, as well as the most important Internet location, Frankfurt. All locations are connected to central exchange nodes such as DE-CIX, AMS-IX, DATA-IX, and V-IX via the company's own fiber optic network. All Hetzner's dedicated servers had a minimum 20 TB monthly cap for full speed on their servers with the option for an extra fee for full speed past that point. However, they have lifted the bandwidth cap on 1 Gbit/s connection speeds as of October 1, 2018.

In 2025, Hetzner began upgrading its core network infrastructure using Nokia routing technology. The upgrade includes the deployment of 7750 SR-1x routers, which support 100G connections and are compatible with higher-capacity interconnects such as 400G and 800G.

== Incidents ==
=== Hacking ===
In June 2013, Hetzner Online suffered from a security breach where customer information was exposed to attackers who had compromised Hetzner Online's monitoring systems.

=== Russian complaints about Glavcom.ua ===
In early August 2014, the Russian Federal Service for Supervision of Communications, Information Technology and Mass Media (Roskomnadzor) sent a demand to many news agencies prohibiting any mention of the demonstration that was being arranged in the Siberian city of Novosibirsk in support of the federalization of Siberia. A number of such messages were sent to Ukraine, which was in the midst of undeclared war with Russian paramilitaries in the Donetsk region. Since the Ukrainian online newspapers did not remove the article, Roskomnadzor sent letters to their internet providers demanding removal of the news item. Hetzner Online complied with the demands and sent a notice to glavcom.ua, saying "Please solve the problem and reply within the next 24 hours to avoid suspension. This is the final deadline."

This story was widely reprinted in news sources. The Ukrainian Ministry of Foreign Affairs issued a statement expressing solidarity with glavcom.ua owners and journalists. Vassily Zvarych, vice-head of the Communications Department of the Foreign Ministry, gave a press conference saying that he was surprised by Hetzner Online's compliance with the Russian complaint. The German chapter of Reporters Without Borders also issued a statement condemning Roskomnadzor.

The notices to suspend Glavcom.ua were issued by Hetzner Online August 6, 2014; on August 10 Hetzner Online issued apologies, denying that any censorship was planned and that their technical support made a mistake, which they regretted. However, by that time the story was widely published in German mass-media, and Glavcom.ua already migrated from Hetzner Online to another hosting provider.

=== no.spam.ee lawsuit ===
In 2013, an Estonian anti-spam activist Tõnu Samuel posted a blog entry about an alleged spammer Silver Teede on his website no.spam.ee. In retaliation, Teede wrote a complaint to the blog's service provider, Hetzner Online, who decided to terminate services for the blog. In an ensuing court case, Estonian courts found the complaints to be baseless and awarded Samuel damages from Silver Teede for the loss of Samuel's servers.

=== Duplicate Ed25519 SSH keys ===
From April 2015 to December 2015, many of the OS images used by Hetzner's installation program installimage had used duplicate Ed25519 SSH keys. This could potentially mean that an attacker could use a man-in-the-middle attack to compromise an SSH connection that was using Ed25519 keys. Hetzner sent an email to all affected customers with any potentially affected servers on information about the issue, and how to fix it.

=== Blocking Novaya Gazeta ===
On January 11, 2016, Hetzner blocked the St. Petersburg site of Novaya Gazeta, the leading opposition, non-government newspaper in Russia. The newspaper alleged the act was political censorship without any legal justification.

=== Blocking Ukraine War information ===
On March 7, 2022, during the 2022 Russian invasion of Ukraine, Hetzner disabled the hosting account behind a Ukrainian state-affiliated war information website (war.ukraine.ua). Hetzner initially denied blocking the website in question, stating that Cloudflare informed them that the IP does not belong to their network. Two days later, Hetzner confirmed via a press release that they had erroneously suspended the servers due to "anomalies" found in the account by an employee, which came from a not yet fully developed "plausibility check" and stated that their actions had not been politically motivated. The press release has since been deleted from the Hetzner website.

=== Blocking Russian users ===
In December 2023, Hetzner allegedly sent an email to its users informing them that they will be ending contractual relationship with customers from Russia. Policy was scheduled to take place on January 31, 2024.

=== Deletion of the Website of “Zaborona” ===
In November 2025, Hetzner removed the website of the Ukrainian independent media project Zaborona, along with all associated server infrastructure. The formal reason given was a two‑month overdue hosting payment amounting to €173.89. Prior to the shutdown, Hetzner had forwarded several notices from the Russian media regulator Roskomnadzor to Zaborona, requesting the removal of specific articles. These included, among others, a report on alleged abuses in areas controlled by Russia. Editor‑in‑chief Kateryna Serhatskova stated that the newsroom had repeatedly informed the provider that Zaborona is a Ukrainian media project and does not fall under Russian jurisdiction.
