= Service for French Internet Exchange =

Internet exchange point in France

- Full name: Service for French Internet Exchange
- Abbreviation: SFINX
- Founded: 1995
- Location: France
- Website: Official website
- Members: 27

The Service for French Internet Exchange (SFINX) is a French IXPs (Internet Exchange Points), along with France-IX and PARIX. It's PoPs are based at Interxion "Paris 1" in Aubervilliers and Telehouse "Paris 2" in the 11th arrondissement of Paris.

It is operated by RENATER, the French National Research and Education Network (NREN).

== See also ==
- List of Internet exchange points
- List of Internet exchange points by size
- Internet exchange
- Peering
