= RESTENA =

Communications network in luxembourg

Réseau Téléinformatique de l'Education Nationale et de la Recherche
- Abbreviation: Restena Foundation
- Formation: 27 July 2000
- Legal status: Foundation
- Purpose: Education and research Internet provider, hosting and related services
- Headquarters: Luxembourg, Luxembourg
- Region served: Luxembourg
- President: Robert Kerger
- Main organ: Administrative Council
- Website: www.restena.lu

RESTENA (Réseau Téléinformatique de l'Education Nationale et de la Recherche) is the high-speed network for the education and research community of the Grand Duchy of Luxembourg. The network has been operational since 1989 and connected to the global Internet since 1992.

The network is operated by the Restena Foundation, which was established in 2000. The Restena Foundation brings together all types of research and teaching bodies and the Ministry of National Education and Vocational Training, the Ministry of Higher Education and Research and the Ministry of Finance

The foundation also coordinates national Internet resources including the domain name registry for the .lu domain and participates actively in the Internet exchange point (LU-CIX).

== Network services ==
The Restena Foundation offers eligible institutions and establishments in the field of education, research, culture, health, administration Internet access, and connectivity to GÉANT and the Luxembourg Internet Exchange. A point-to-point connection service is available for institutions to interconnect remote sites via a virtual private network (VPN); those links are implemented via DWDM lambdas or Ethernet VLAN. Connected institutions can benefit from a range of network management services, such as data communications equipment configuration and monitoring of the connection facilities between the institution and the national backbone. A secure Web interface allows the institution's connectivity performance to be monitored and evaluated. Service availability (www, mail, etc.) is watched, and the status is notified by email or SMS.

The domain name service includes recursive, authoritative DNS servers for all domain names required by the institutions.

The Network Time Protocol service allows synchronizing the clocks of all computer and network equipment. This service is available to connected institutions and individual users.

A pool of public IPv4 and IPv6 addresses are available for allocation to connect institutions.

== Access services for individuals ==
The ADSL service provides continuous, unlimited access at high speeds to all national RESTENA network services and the Internet and GÉANT. Dial-up access via ISDN or analog modem gives less demanding users access to network services.

The VPN (Virtual Private Network) service provides a secure connection to the network. The service is available to any user connected outside the network wishing to access ordinarily inaccessible intranet services or external services reserved for RESTENA users.

The Restena Foundation helps to operate the international roaming service eduroam in Luxembourg. eduroam allows users of participating institutions worldwide to access the Internet from any of these institutions using the access credentials obtained from their home institution.

== Email services ==
For institutions, the Restena Foundation offers on-line email account management, central spam and virus protection, and mailing lists. To individual users, the Restena Foundation offers value-added email accounts, Webmail, spam and virus protection, and a directory service (only accessible from the RESTENA network).

== Hosting services ==
The Restena Foundation provides a website hosting, including hard disk space allocation, FTP access for site updates, databases, and website visits statistics. It also offers a virtual dedicated server service dedicated physical servers located in the secure server rooms of the Restena Foundation.

== Security services ==
Restena-CSIRT is the Restena Foundation's Computer Security Incident Response Team (CSIRT). It supports and coordinates security incident response within the constituency, serves as a trusted point of contact and acts as a clearinghouse for security incident-related information, improves awareness and knowledge of IT security among the constituents, and maintains contacts with other CSIRTs and cooperates with national and international CSIRT organizations.
