= Internet in India =

Internet in India, which began in 1986 with access only to the educational and research community and on 15 August 1995 with access to the general public. In 2025, India has over 1 billion internet users. As of 2025, 7 in 10 Indians are now online, with 70% internet penetration. It is reported that in 2022 an average mobile Internet consumption in India was 19.5GB per month and the mobile data usage per month rose from 4.5 exabytes in 2018 to 14.4 exabytes in 2022. The Indian Government has embarked on initiatives such as Digital India, BharatNet, Common Service Centres, UPI instant payment system, Startup India, and others to further expedite the growth of internet-based ecosystems.

== History ==
=== 1986: Early days and ERNET ===
In 1986, the history of the Internet in India began with the launch of the Educational Research Network (ERNET), The network was made available only to educational and research communities. even though the early pre-internet computer networks were operated in India since the late 1970s by the Oil and Natural Gas Corporation and the Indian Military. along with general-use computer networks such as INDONET, NICNET, and VIKRAM. ERNET was initiated by the Department of Electronics (DoE), with funding from the Government of India and United Nations Development Program (UNDP), involving eight premier institutions as participating agencies—NCST Bombay, Indian Institute of Science, five Indian Institutes of Technology (Delhi, Mumbai, Kanpur, Kharagpur and Chennai), and the DoE in New Delhi. ERNET began as a multi protocol network with both the TCP/IP and the OSI-IP protocol stacks running over the leased-line portion of the backbone. Since 1995, however, almost all traffic is carried over TCP/IP.

In 1990, the ERNET was allotted Class B IP address 144.16.0.0 by NIC (then InterNIC). Subsequently, Class C addresses were allotted to ERNET by APNIC.

In January 1991, the first leased line of 9.6 kbit/s was installed in January 1991 between Delhi and Mumbai.

In 1992, all IITs, IISc Bangalore, DOE Delhi and NCST Mumbai were connected by 9.6 kbit/s leased line, 64 kbit/s Internet gateway link was commissioned from NCST Mumbai to UUNet in Virginia in United States.

In 1995, NICNet was established for communications between government institutions. The network was operated by the National Informatics Centre.

=== 1995: Public internet in India ===
On 15 August 1995, the first publicly available internet service in India was launched by state-owned Videsh Sanchar Nigam Limited (VSNL). At the time, VSNL had a monopoly over international communications in the country and private enterprise was not permitted in the sector. The internet service, known as the Gateway Internet Access Service (GIAS), provided a speed of 9.6 kbit/s speed and was priced at ₹5,200 for 250 hours for individuals, ₹16,200 for institutional dial-up SLIP/PPP accounts, and higher for leased line services. However, for the next 10 years, the Internet experience in the country remained less attractive, with narrow-band connections having speeds less than 56 kbit/s (dial-up).

In 1997, Integrated Services Digital Network (ISDN) access was introduced.

=== 2004: Broadband ===
In 2004, the government formulated its broadband policy, which defined broadband as "an always-on Internet connection with a download speed of 256 kbit/s or above."

Since 2005, the growth of the broadband sector in the country accelerated but remained below the growth estimates of the government and related agencies due to resource issues in last-mile access, which were predominantly wired-line technologies.

=== 2010: Wireless broadband ===
In 2010, to improve the internet speed and remove the speed bottleneck of wired-line, the government pushed for the wireless mobile by auctioning the 3G spectrum, followed by 4G spectrum auction, that set the scene for a competitive and invigorated wireless broadband market.

In 2013, the minimum speed requirement for broadband connection was set as 512 kbit/s. This requirement was further raised to 2 Mbit/s in 2023.

In 2020, WANI (Prime Minister Wi-Fi Access Network Interface) policy India was launched, aimed at increasing internet connectivity especially in rural areas and enhancing the proliferation of public Wi-Fi hotspots across the country by creating a robust decentralized digital communications infrastructure with Public Data Offices (PDOs) operating, maintaining, and delivering broadband services to subscribers through Wi-Fi access points or routers.

=== 2016: Reliance Jio and the digital explosion ===
On 5 September 2016, Reliance Jio Infocomm Limited commercially launched an all-IP 4G network built on Voice over LTE (VoLTE) technology, skipping legacy 2G/3G infrastructure entirely. The launch disrupted the Indian telecommunications market by offering free voice calls and free high-speed 4G data during its initial promotional periods. Afterwards, prices were set at roughly ₹10–₹50 per GB, which was over 90% cheaper than prevailing rates. This led to the rapid onboarding of over 100 million subscribers within 170 days.

This drastic drop in mobile data prices triggered a period of rapid digital transformation across India, often referred to as the "Jio Effect".

=== 2023: 5G and 6G ===
Since 2023, 5G was driving India's internet speed. The 6G innovation is driven by India's indigenous government and industry alliance Bharat 6G Alliance (B6GA)

== Technologies ==
Wired Internet access technologies by usage share as of 30 September 2023:
1. Fibre (87.0%)
2. Ethernet/LAN (7.54%)
3. DSL (2.86%)
4. Cable modem (1.87%)
5. Leased line (0.67%)
6. Dial up (0.01%)
Wireless Internet access technologies by usage share as of 30 September 2023:
1. LTE (82.9%)
2. 5G (11.3%)
3. GPRS/EDGE (3.74%)
4. HSPA/WCDMA (1.87%)
5. Wi-Fi (0.10%)
6. Radio/Wi-Max/VSAT (0.09%)

=== Wireless Internet ===
The following frequencies are used to provide wireless Internet services in India:

- 2G : GSM 900 MHz, GSM 1800 MHz
- 3G : WCDMA UMTS 2100 MHz, 900 MHz
- 4G : TD-LTE 2300 MHz, 2500 MHz, FD-LTE 2100 MHz, 1800 MHz, 900 MHz, 850 MHz
- CDMA : 800 MHz (for 1x voice and data & EVDO Rev A, Rev B, Rev B Phase II data)
- 5G :

=== Wired Internet ===
Fixed-line or wired Internet technologies used in India include digital subscriber line, (DSL), Dial-up Internet access, Ethernet and local area network (LAN), Cable modem, fibre to the home, and leased line.

== Internet services ==
=== Internet user base ===
India has the second highest number of Internet users in the world. The following table provides an overview of Internet subscriber statistics in India as on 30 September 2023.

Statistic	Figures
Total subscribers	918.19 million
Narrowband subscribers	33.19 million
Broadband subscribers	885 million
Wired subscribers	37.11 million
Wireless subscribers	881.08 million
Urban subscribers	542.53 million
Rural subscribers	375.66 million
Overall net penetration	65.89%
Urban net penetration	110.03%
Rural net penetration	41.72%

World Economic Forum (WEF) reports that 60% of Indian internet users viewed vernacular content and only about a quarter of internet users were over the age of 35 years in 2019, 1.1 billion Indians would have access to the Internet by 2030 with 80% of the subscriber base primarily accessing the Internet on mobile devices. The profile of India's internet user base was predicted to diversify by 2030 with 80% of users accessing vernacular content and with users over 25 years making up 45% of the total subscriber base. There is also a digital gender gap with far more male Internet users in the country compared to female users. The gap is more pronounced in rural hinterlands compared to urban metros.

=== Broadband subscribers ===
Market share of broadband (wired + wireless) services in India as of 31 December 2023 according to the Telecom Regulatory Authority of India (TRAI):
1. Jio (52.0%)
2. Airtel (29.3%)
3. Vi (14.1%)
4. BSNL (2.78%)
5. ACT (0.25%)
6. Others (1.65%)

The following table shows the top 5 broadband (Wired and Wireless) service providers in India by total subscriber base as of 31 December 2023.

The following table shows the top 4 Wired broadband service providers in India by total subscriber base as of 31 December 2023.

The following table shows the top 4 Wireless broadband service providers in India by total subscriber base as of 31 December 2023.

Provider	Subscribers (million)	Ownership
Jio	459.81	Jio Platforms
Airtel	257.37	Bharti Airtel
Vi (Note: After adding subscribers of You Broadband Because it is subsidiary of Vi.)	127.28	Vodafone Idea Limited
BSNL (Note: BSNL and MTNL merger approved by Government of India.)	21.28 (Note: After adding subscribers of MTNL to BSNL, because MTNL will merge with BSNL.)	Government of India

=== Internet service providers ===
In 2023, there were 1151 Internet service providers (ISPs) offering broadband and narrowband services in India; which owned 42,133 Gbit/s total international Internet bandwidth. International bandwidth is the maximum rate of data transmission from a single country to the rest of the world. In 2023, ten largest ISPs account for 98.82% of the total subscriber base, namely Jio (49.99%), Airtel (30.16%), Vodafone Idea (14.94%), BSNL (3.06%) and Atria Convergence Technologies (0.24%); five largest wired broadband providers were Jio (26.28%), Airtel (18.93%), BSNL (10.08%), Atria Convergence Technologies (5.92%), Hathway (3.01%); and the five largest wireless broadband providers are Jio (50.98%), Airtel (30.63%), Vodafone Idea (15.57%), BSNL (2.77%) and Intech Online Pvt. Ltd (0.03%).

The telecom circles of Maharashtra (78.36 million), Uttar Pradesh (73.59 million), Bihar (69.89 million), Andhra Pradesh (68.38 million), and Madhya Pradesh (62.85 million) have the most internet subscribers as on 30 September 2023.

=== Common Service Centres (CSC) for people with no internet access ===
Common Service Centres (CSC), a key component of the Digital India, provide essential government and non-government services through internet to citizens specially those who are not connected to the internet, particularly in rural and remote areas. CSCs act as access points for various public utility services, social welfare schemes, healthcare, financial, and education services, CSCs play a crucial role in the digital empowerment of the underserved populations.

=== Internet speed ===
Since 2023, 5G was driving India's internet speed, ranking ahead of many G20 countries.

In November 2023 Speedtest Global Index, ranked India 18th out of 145 countries by median mobile Internet speed (94.62 Mbit/s download and 9.02 Mbit/s upload) and 87th out of 181 countries by median fixed broadband speed (58.62 Mbit/s download and 50.42 Mbit/s upload).

TRAI in India defines the minimum speed for the internet to be classified as broadband and over the years TRAI has upwardly revised these minimum download speed. In 2014 TRAI increased the minimum download speed from 256 kbit/s to 512 kbit/s, and in 2021 to 2 Mbit/s.

=== Data cost ===
As per the Global Mobile Data Affordability Index, India with 11th rank is among countries with world's lowest cost for the internet and mobile data as data cost in India is only 0.65% of salary as compared to the global average of 4.09% salary. After the launch of Reliance Jio in 2016, Internet data rates dropped considerably, and the rival telecom companies responded by expanding their fiber optic networks with lower data costs offers to the consumers.

=== Global connectivity ===
In February 2024, the Internet is delivered to India mainly by 17 different undersea fibre cables, including SEA-ME-WE 3, Bay of Bengal Gateway and Europe India Gateway, arriving at 5 different landing points. In 2022, it was reported that India is also a potential market of Starlink. And apart from having one overland internet connection at the city of Agartala near the border with Bangladesh, India has also established a 2,300-kilometre undersea cable to its Andaman and Nicobar archipelago in 2020 and a 1,868 kilometre undersea cable to Lakshadweep islands to increase internet connectivity. In 2024, Reliance has completed underlying the world's largest submarine cable system, India-Europe-Xpress (IEX) and India-Asia-Xpress (IAX), connecting Europe and Asia with India its centre.

In September 2025, undersea cable cuts in the Red Sea disrupted internet connectivity in parts of Asia and the Middle East, including India. NetBlocks attributed the outages to failures in the SMW4 and IMEWE systems near Jeddah, Saudi Arabia. Indian providers quickly rerouted traffic through alternative networks, limiting the impact on domestic users and highlighting the resilience of India's internet infrastructure.

== Industry ==
=== E-commerce ===
In 2024, the Indian e-commerce market was $147.3 billion with 18.7% CAGR through to 2028 which will be further fueled by the technology innovations (5G & 6G based higher internet speed, AI and ML based hyper-personalized shopping experience, immersive AR and VR virtual try-ons and virtual stores, blockchain based enhanced supply chain transparency and increased trust among consumers), cheaper data rates, rising smartphone adoption, increased market penetration (Tier II and Tier III cities which contribute 60% of business and Direct-to-consumer (D2C) brands grew from 2% five years ago to now 15% with projected future CAGR of 40%), and evolving consumer behaviors (12% growth in Gross Merchandise Value (GMV) and 23.8% growth in digital payments fueled by UPI. By 2027, the number of Indian ecommerce consumers will 400 million as compared to 312.5 million in 2022.

=== Data centers ===
Increasingly more data centres are being built in India. The list of existing data centre includes the BSNL Dimension Data joint venture, Amazon Web Services, Google Cloud, Trimax IT Infrastructure & Services Limited, aerloop Broadband, Airlive Broadband, CTRLS Data Center, Digital Ocean, GPX Global Systems Inc, HostFe, HostRain, MegaHostZone, Net4 Datacenter, Netmagic Solutions, Reliance Datacenter, RackBank Datacenter, Sify Technologies Limited, Tata Communications Limited, Web Werks, etc.

=== Internet exchange points ===
Some of the internet exchange points (IXPs or IXes), which allow participant ISPs to exchange data destined for their respective networks, in India are: AMS IX, DE-CIX, Extreme IX, Mumbai Convergence Hub, Mumbai IX, NIXI, etc.

== Challenges ==
India has the second highest number of internet users in the world, several issues however exist.

=== Cybercrimes and lack of cyber awareness ===
==== Cybercrimes ====
As of 2025, less than 33% youth in India aged 15–29 can browse the internet properly, send emails, or conduct online transactions. Due to the lack of cybersecurity awareness among users, the various forms of cybercrimes and Internet frauds have been rising in India with the rise of internet usage, specially the

- General cybercrimes: e.g. cyberbullying, social engineering, phishing, etc.
- Specialised cybercrimes: e.g. digital arrest, darknet market, etc.
  - Fraud factory: e.g. large fraud organizations usually involving cyber fraud and human trafficking operations.
  - Financial crimes: such as advance-fee scam, high-yield investment program (HYIP) scam, cryptocurrency crimes, ad-fraud, etc.
  - Romance scams: e.g. specially pig butchering scam, Sextortion, cybersex trafficking, etc.
- Nationality security threats: cyberterrorism and cyberwarfare.

==== Lack of victim support and compensation ====
Victims of cyber financial frauds in India are required to inform the bank within 3 days. With low cybersecurity awareness in India, yet with nearly 700 million smartphones in 2025, India's loss mitigation approach with such short reporting window penalises victims for lacking awareness. There are demands to increase the reporting window (e.g. to 13 months like UK has done) and implement compensation mechanism (like Singapore has done) for the victims of financial loss due to cybercrimes.

==== Cybercrime prevention and management ====
Some of the organisations in India for the cybersecurity and cybercrime prevent are

- Indian Computer Emergency Response Team (CERT-In or ICERT), Indian government's nodal agency to strengthen security-related defence of the Indian Internet domain and deal with cyber security incidents. Cyber Swachhta Kendra within CERT-In (Botnet Cleaning and Malware Analysis Centre) on 21 February 2017 as part of the Government of India's Digital India initiative under MeitY.
- National Critical Information Infrastructure Protection Centre, national Nodal Agency in terms of Critical Information Infrastructure Protection.
- Data Security Council of India, national industry body on data protection, cyber security and privacy in India).
- NATGRID, integrated intelligence master database structure for counter-terrorism purposes which connects databases of various core security agencies.
- National Cyber Coordination Centre, cybersecurity and e-surveillance agency which screen communication metadata and co-ordinate the intelligence gathering activities of other agencies.
- National Technical Research Organisation, national security.
- National Institute of Cryptology Research and Development, research including cryptology.

=== Censorship ===
Internet censorship in India is selectively practised by both federal and state governments. DNS filtering and educating service users about the ethical usage of internet is an active government policy to regulate and block access to internet content. There are measures to remove content through court orders.

Freedom House's Freedom on the Net 2022 report, ranks India 37th out of 70 countries, and rates India "Partly Free" with a rating of 51 (0-100 scale, lower is better). Its "Obstacles to Access" rated 13 (0-25 scale), "Limits on Content" rated 21 (0-32 scale), and "Violations of User Rights" rated 17 (0-40 scale).

=== Digital divide ===
Digital divide exists in India where growth is biased in favour of richer states and urban areas. Regulators have tried to boost the growth of broadband in rural areas by promoting higher investment in rural infrastructure and establishing subsidised tariffs for rural subscribers under the Universal service obligation scheme of the Indian government. COVID-19 expedited the adoption of internet and helped reduce digital divide in India, internet traffic in India increased by 30% during the first six months of the pandemic, Indians using the internet for education increased by 50%, Indians using the internet for healthcare increased by 60%.

=== Net neutrality ===
In February 2016, net neutrality was introduced in India when TRAI made a decision prohibiting telecom service providers from levying discriminatory rates for data, thus ruling in favour of Net Neutrality in India. This move was welcomed not just by millions of Indians but also by various political parties, businesspersons, industry leaders, and the inventor of the World Wide Web, Tim Berners Lee. Prior this there were no laws governing net neutrality in India, which would require that all Internet users be treated equally, without discriminating or charging differentially by user, content, site, platform, application, type of attached equipment, or mode of communication, and there already had been a few violations of net neutrality principles by some Indian service providers. The debate on network neutrality in India gathered public attention after Airtel, a mobile telephony service provider in India, announced in December 2014 additional charges for making voice calls (VoIP) from its network using apps like WhatsApp, Skype, etc. Consequently, Telecom Regulatory Authority of India (TRAI) release of consultation paper on Regulatory Framework for Over-the-top (OTT) services in 2015.

== Future ==
Bharat 6G Alliance (B6GA), India's government and industry alliance for fostering the indigenous 6G ecosystem aimed at making India global leader by 2030 in the next generation 6G communication technology, has 7 working focused on 7 different important aspects of 6G, namely "Spectrum" (allocation and management of 6G radio frequencies), "RAN and Core Networks" (radio access network and core network technologies), "AI and Sensing, and Security" (integration of artificial intelligence and sensing technologies and the cybersecurity of 6G networks), "Device Technologies" (development of 6G devices, sensors, and manufacturing ecosystems), "Standards" (ensure interoperability and global compatibility), "Green and Sustainability" (environmental impact and sustainable practices), and "Use Cases" (potential innovative applications). Alliance has 3 core principles: affordability, sustainability, and ubiquity.

== See also ==
- General
  - Internet censorship in India
  - Electronics and semiconductor manufacturing industry in India
  - National Optical Fibre Network
  - Media of India
  - Telecommunications in India
- Services
  - Common Service Centres
  - Digital India
  - Over-the-top media services in India
  - Mobile telephone numbering in India
- Global lists
  - List of countries by number of Internet users
  - List of mobile phone brands by country
  - List of sovereign states by number of broadband Internet subscriptions
  - List of countries by Internet connection speeds
  - List of countries by smartphone penetration
