= North Rock Communications =

North Rock Communications Ltd.
- Company type: Private
- Industry: Telecommunication
- Founded: Bermuda, 1997
- Headquarters: 7 Par La Ville Rd., Hamilton, HM 13, Bermuda
- Key people: Vicki Coelho, General Manager
- Products: Broadband; Dialup; Colocation; Data Centre; Webhosting; VoIP; WiMAX
- Website: www.northrock.bm

North Rock Communications Ltd. is an Internet and telecommunications service provider located in Bermuda. It is the second largest ISP on the island, and through its own WiMAX Network, is the only company to offer both Internet service and connectivity under the same corporate entity.

== History ==
North Rock was launched in 1997 with a staff of three people offering dial-up Internet service. Over the next several years, the company developed one of the largest internet and telecommunications architectures, consisting of several data centres, a country-wide WiMax network, and a suite of telephony services.

== Present ==
As of 2012, North Rock remains the only Bermudian-owned and operated internet service provider. Its chairwoman, Vicki Coelho, is involved in and regularly cited on matters of Bermudian telecommunications regulation. It is currently facing increasing competition from foreign-owned entities, with Jamaica-based Digicel recently entering the internet services market.
