= .in =

Internet country code top-level domain for India

- Introduced: 8 May 1989; 37 years ago
- TLD type: Country code top-level domain
- Status: Active
- Registry: INRegistry
- Sponsor: National Internet Exchange of India
- Intended use: Entities connected with India
- Actual use: Very popular in India. Liberalisation of registration rules in 2005 led to a large increase in registrations including overseas registrations.
- Registered domains: 4 million+ (October 2026)
- Registration restrictions: No restrictions on who can register second-level domains or most third-level domains; various specific restrictions under some of those specialised subdomains.
- Structure: May register at the second level or at the third level beneath generic-category 2nd-level domains
- Documents: Policies
- Dispute policies: .IN Domain Name Dispute Resolution Policy (INDRP)
- DNSSEC: Yes
- Registry website: registry.in

.भारत
- Logo for .भारत, (romanised as .bhārata)
- Introduced: 5 February 2011; 15 years ago
- TLD type: Internationalised (Devanagari) country code top-level domain
- Status: Active
- Registry: INRegistry
- Sponsor: National Internet Exchange of India
- Intended use: Entities connected with India
- Actual use: Getting popular in India.
- Registration restrictions: Devanagari script. Also comply with certain Devanagari Phonological rules; restrictions under some specialised subdomains like सरकार.भारत (≈ gov.in) and विद्या.भारत (≈ edu.in)
- Structure: May register at the second level or at the third level beneath generic-category 2nd-level domains.
- DNS name: xn--h2brj9c
- DNSSEC: Yes
- Registry website: रजिस्ट्री.भारत (registry.bhārata)

.in is the country code top-level domain (ccTLD) for India. It was introduced in May 1989. It is currently administered by the National Internet Exchange of India.

== Registry operator ==
The domain was originally managed by the National Centre for Software Technology (NCST), Mumbai and its Centre for Development of Advanced Computing (C-DAC). The Government of India issued an executive order in 2004 to transfer responsibility for managing .in domains to the newly created INRegistry under the authority of the National Internet Exchange of India (NIXI). The National Informatics Centre (NIC), ERNET, and the Ministry of Defence were appointed as registrars for the gov.in, res.in and ac.in, and the mil.in domains respectively.

From August 2012 to February 2019, the registry was managed under contract by Afilias India Pvt. Ltd, a subsidiary of Afilias.

In August 2018, NIXI appointed Neustar Data Infotech (India), a subsidiary of Neustar, Inc., to be the country's new registry services provider. Neustar completed migration of existing .in domains to its registry infrastructure in March 2019. Neustar added the ability to register Indian-language domains in native script by enabling end-to-end web portal language support.

In February 2025, Tucows announced it won the contract to run the backend registry services for India’s .in country code domain. The company is migrating about 4 million .in domains to its platform.

== Second-level domains ==
As of 2005, liberalised policies for the .in domain allow unlimited second-level registrations under .in. Unlimited registrations under the previously structured existing zones are also allowed:

- .in (available to anyone; used by companies, individuals, and organisations in India)
- .co.in (available to anyone; used by companies, individuals, and organisations in India)
- .com.in (intended for banks, registered companies, and trademarks)
- .firm.in (intended for shops, partnerships, liaison offices, sole proprietorships)
- .net.in (intended for Internet service providers)
- .org.in (intended for nonprofit organisations)
- .gen.in (intended for general/miscellaneous use)
- .ind.in (intended for individuals)

Zones reserved for use by qualified institutions in India:

- .ernet.in (older, used by both educational and research institutes)
- .ac.in (used by academic institutions)
- .edu.in (used by educational institutions)
- .res.in (used by Indian research institutes)
- .gov.in (used by the Indian government and state governments)
- .mil.in (used by Indian military organisations)
- .bank.in (used by Indian Banking Institutions)
- .fin.in (used by Indian Financial and other Non-Banking Financial Institutions (NBFCs))

The domain .nic.in is reserved for India's National Informatics Centre, but in practice most Indian government agencies have domains ending in .nic.in.

The .in registry launched following second-level domains on 29 October 2021 to benefit the growing market:

- .5g.in
- .6g.in
- .ai.in
- .am.in
- .bihar.in
- .biz.in
- .business.in
- .ca.in
- .cn.in
- .com.in
- .coop.in
- .cs.in
- .delhi.in
- .dr.in
- .er.in
- .gujarat.in
- .info.in
- .int.in
- .internet.in
- .io.in
- .me.in
- .pg.in
- .post.in
- .pro.in
- .travel.in
- .tv.in
- .uk.in
- .up.in
- .us.in

Before the introduction of liberalised registration policies for the .in domain, only 7000 names had been registered between 1992 and 2004. As of March 2010, the number had increased to over 610,000 domain names with 60% of registrations coming from India and the rest from overseas. By October 2011, the number had surpassed 1 million domain names. As of March 2016, the number has more than doubled to over 2 million domain names.

== Restrictions on use of .in domains ==
As per the terms and conditions of the .in registry, domain privacy is not allowed.

Recently updated EKYC guidelines were issued to all registrars to authenticate new registrants. Hence, the previous rule relating to bulk booking of .in domain names has been withdrawn. Now customers can book unlimited .in domain names as previously in line with promoting .in TLD on par with other popular TLDs like .com and others which also has no restrictions relating to bulk booking.

== Internationalised domain names and country codes ==
India has introduced internationalised domain names in the 22 local languages used in the country. As of October 2016, fifteen of these internationalised domain names were accepted by ICANN:

- .भारत (Devanagari), became available with the following zones:

Devanagari string	Transliterated string
भारत	.bharat
कंपनी.भारत	company.bharat
विद्या.भारत	vidya.bharat
सरकार.भारत	sarkar.bharat

- .ভারত (Bengali), available as of 2017
- .ਭਾਰਤ (Gurmukhī), only ਡਾਟਾਮੇਲ.ਭਾਰਤ as of August 2017
- .ભારત (Gujarati), available as of 2017
- .இந்தியா (Tamil), available as of 2015
- .భారత్ (Telugu), available as of 2017
- .بھارت (Urdu) only ڈاٹامیل.بھارت as of August 2017 (mainly right-to-left character order)

In 2016, an application for eight further domains was accepted. While the Indian government also applied for .বাংলা (Bengali), it was given to a competing applicant, the Bangladesh Telecommunication Company Limited (BTCL).These domains were not available (as of October 2016): But, they were later on made available and now are open for domain registration in India.

- .ಭಾರತ (Kannada)
- .ভাৰত (Assamese)
- بارت. (Kashmiri)
- .ഭാരതം (Malayalam)
- .ଭାରତ (Odia)
- .भारतम् (Sanskrit)
- .भारोत (Santali)
- ڀارت. (Sindhi)

== See also ==
- Internet in India

== External links and references ==
- IANA Whois information
- whois information
- Policies from the INRegistry website
- List of Accredited registrars for .in
