= Wireless Washtenaw =

Failed public/private partnership

The Wireless Washtenaw project was originally an ambitious plan to provide free wireless broadband access throughout Washtenaw County, Michigan, by April 2008 "without a burden on taxpayers". To accomplish this, it was to rely upon a public/ private sector partnership between the Washtenaw County government and 20/20 Communications. In March 2010, due to a failure to qualify for a certain anticipated federal stimulus grant, 20/20 Communications sold most of its operations to 123Net. 20/20 Communications however continues to be 123.net's sales representative for the Washtenaw County area via its website and sales office.

123.net has continued to maintain the Wireless Washtenaw network, and in the downtown Ann Arbor area has significantly expanded its transmission capabilities to include the 4G WiMAX microwave band. Their 4G WiMAX service is a business class product offered outside of the original Wireless Washtenaw project. It has also upgraded some of the network equipment of the project as well. As of November 2010, the network provided wireless internet access options to downtown Ann Arbor, Manchester, Saline, Chelsea, and Dexter.

From 2008 through 2010 it became increasingly clear that all of the original goals of the Wireless Washtenaw program were not being achieved by the deadlines as originally stipulated in the 20/20 Communications contract. Since acquisition by 123.net, unless and until an additional source of significant funding for the program might be found, 20/20 Communications, under 123.net has restated the more realistic goals of the plan as merely hoping, "to revisit the possibility of slowly expanding the Wireless Washtenaw network sometime next summer (2011)." One estimate for the amount of additional funding needed to provide full coverage to the county is $10,000,000. New 'free' subscriptions to the service are no longer offered on the 20/20 website. 20/20 also no longer advertises any pricing on its website (November 2010).

== Original project goals ==
Washtenaw County, Michigan, has described the goals of Wireless Washtenaw to be the following;

- Provide an economic development tool to attract and retain businesses
- Reduce the digital divide
- Improve County service delivery
- Facilitate wireless technology use for our citizens and visitors
- Create a seamless wireless infrastructure to attract and retain young professionals
- Establish a wireless broadband network without a burden on taxpayers

== Original time-line objectives ==
One of the Wireless Radios used in Downtown Ann Arbor. This one is located at 20/20 Communications headquarters.

2004

- LinkMI plan – January 2004
- Leadership team developed – June 2004
- Discovery team organized – September 2004
  - 11 organizations involved
- Exploration teams – goal: investigate best practices
  - Technology team
  - Communication team
  - Funding model team

2005

- Stakeholder meeting – March 28, 2005
- Request for information released – June 7, 2005
- Request for information opened – July 7, 2005
- Informational meetings with RFI respondents – July/August
- Request for information amended for additional feedback – October 12, 2005
- Master participation agreement distributed to local units – November 2, 2005
- Request for proposal released – November 29, 2005
- Pre-proposal conference – December 14, 2005

2006

- Board of commissioners approves MPA – March 1, 2006
- RFP responses due – March 7, 2006
- RFP evaluations complete – June 6, 2006
- Recommendation presented to advisory board – June 15, 2006
- BOC pilot provider and contract approval – August 2, 2006
- Provider agreement/contract finalized – September 26, 2006
- Pilot deployment – October through November 2006

2007

- Pilot evaluation – January 19, 2007
- Pilot phase complete – February 28, 2007

(The original contract with 20/20 Communications called for completion of countywide deployment by April 2008. 20/20 has explained the shortfall as being due to the nationwide economic slowdown of 2007, which caused a lack of anticipated funding sources.)

== Current coverage ==
Ann Arbor Coverage Map

In March 2007, 20/20 Communications completed the Wireless Washtenaw Pilot Phase. As of November, 2010, due to lack of funding, 123.net and 20/20 remain in the Pre-Deployment phase of setting up Wireless Washtenaw.

Ann Arbor

As of 11/17/2006, radios have been installed on street lamps or traffic signal arms on:

- Ashley and Liberty
- Main street from Washington to William
- Fourth Ave from Huron to Liberty
- Division from Huron to William
- State Street from Huron to South U.

Each radio transmits 300 to 600 feet depending on obstructions. These radios transmit the 802.11b and g WiFi signal in the 2.4 GHz range.

Manchester

Radios were installed on the Manchester water tower in November 2006. They broadcast the pre-wimax 802.11a signal on the 5.7 GHz band in a 1.5-mile radius. Manchester area residents need to install a radio on their homes as well to receive and translate the signal.

Saline

There are two separate types of signals in the Saline pilot. For home users, Radios have been installed on the Henry Street water tower. They broadcast in the 802.11a Pre-wimax WiFi signal covering an area 360 degrees for 1.5 miles. Residents need a radio mounted on their home to receive this signal.

The downtown business Saline area on US-12 also receives the 802.11b and G WiFi signal on the 2.4 GHz band.

Chelsea and Dexter

As of November 2010, the 20/20 website advertises its coverage as also including the towns of Dexter and Chelsea.

== Private sector partnerships ==
Washtenaw County, Michigan, issued a Request for Information on June 7, 2005; by the June 29, 2005, deadline set fourth by the county, 23 private sector corporations responded to the RFI were received. These companies include:

- 20/20 Communications
- Air Advantage Franchising Group
- Belair (with Winncom and Nomadix)
- Every://WARE
- IBM
- ITP Wireless
- Michigan Broadband Systems
- MichTel
- Motorola
- NeoReach
- OpAve
- PCS Broadband
- Provide.Net
- Quality Technologies
- RFconnect
- SBC
- Siemens
- SkyTel
- SpotFone, Inc
- Tropos Networks
- Vivato (with Pronto Networks)
- Washtenaw Wideopen Wireless (Cybernet, Synergy, IC.Net)
- Wireless Resources (Nortel, Comp-U-Ware, Airpath)

After reviewing the results of the Wireless Washtenaw RFI, the county release a Request For Proposal on November 29, 2005.

On June 15, 2006, the Wireless Washtenaw Advisory Board recommended to the county that 20/20 Communications be selected as the private sector partner for Wireless Washtenaw.

The recommendation was given final approval on August 2, 2006. In early 2010, 20/20 Communications sold its ownership share of Wireless Washtenaw to 123.net.

== See also ==
- Washtenaw County, Michigan
