= Belgian National Internet eXchange =

Internet exchange point located in Belgium

- Full name: Belgian National Internet eXchange
- Abbreviation: BNIX
- Founded: 1995
- Location: Belgium, Brussels
- Website: Official website
- Members: 67
- Peak: 500G

The Belgian National Internet eXchange (BNIX) is an internet exchange point operated by the Belgian national research network BELNET. Created in 1995, it is one of the charter members of Euro-IX, the European Internet Exchange Association.

BNIX peering is available at four point of presence (PoP) locations in Belgium:

- Digital Realty (previously Interxion) in Zaventem
- Colt Technology Services (previously owned by Lumen Technologies, Level 3 Communications, CenturyLink) in Evere
- LCL in Diegem
- Unix-Solutions in Zaventem

Previously Belnet also operated a PoP in Brussels. This location was taken out of service at the end of 2008.

The three sites are connected via three 100 Gbit/s connections in a ring topology. BNIX carries IPv4, Multicast (since 1999) and IPv6 (since 2000) traffic.

BNIX charges connection fees and a monthly fee, depending on the type of connection.

== See also ==
- List of Internet exchange points
