= Teleport (Staten Island) =

Business park in New York City

Coordinates: 40°36′21″N 74°10′37″W

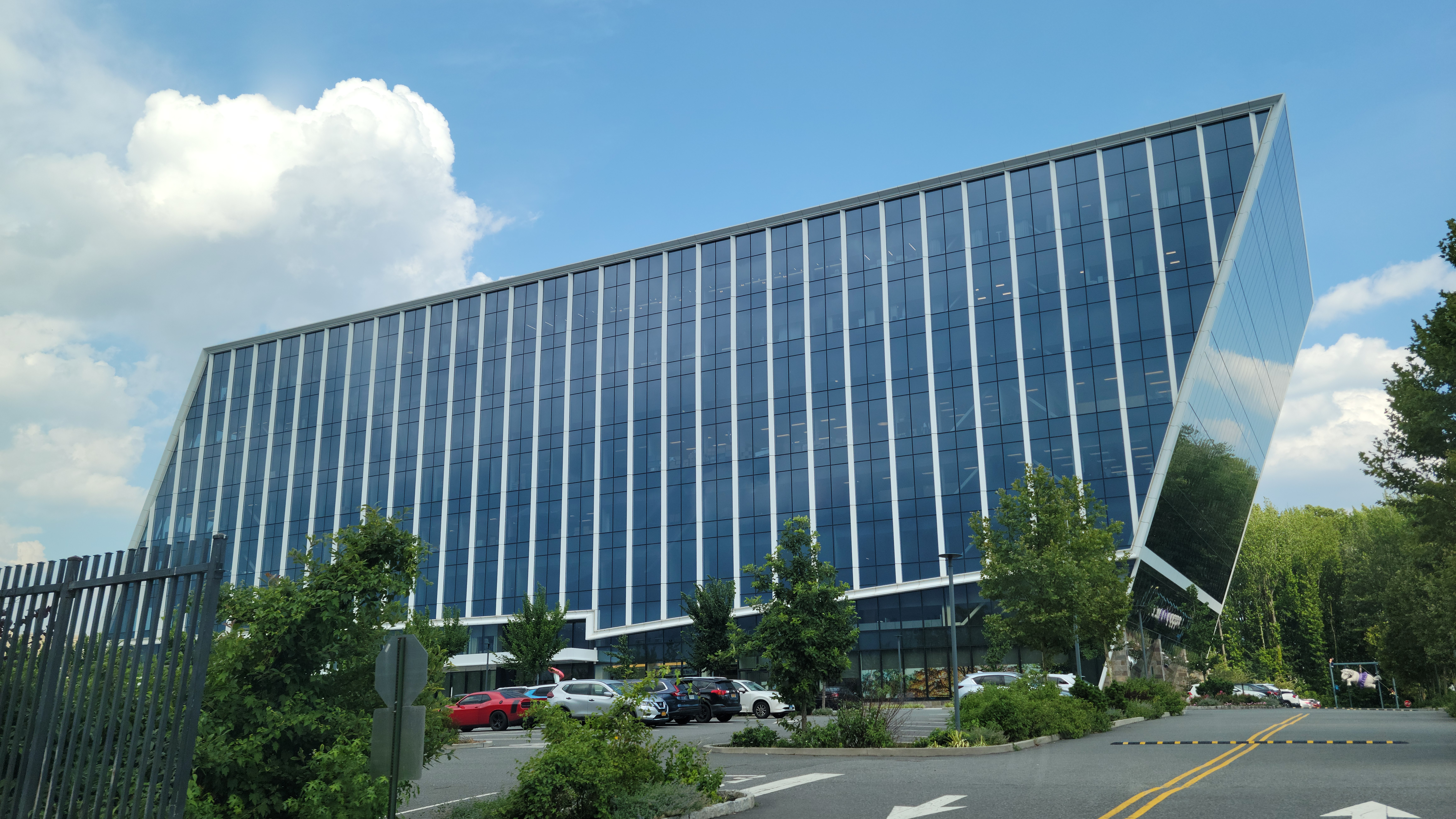
Corporate Commons Three, opened in 2021 within the Teleport complex.

The Teleport is a suburban-style 100-acre business park east of New York State Route 440 and west of the Bulls Head neighborhood of Staten Island in New York City. It includes five Class A office and specialized buildings totaling 700,000 square feet, as well as additional development-ready sites.

The Teleport was developed in the mid-1980s by the government of New York City and the Port Authority of New York and New Jersey (PANYNJ), which manages it under contract to the city, focusing on new technologies and offering high-speed voice, data and video services via satellite and fiber optic connectivity.

In 2001 AT&T, the Teleport's biggest tenant, moved 4,000 employees out of two office buildings on the site. They were sold in 2009 to the Nicotra Group, LLC and renamed Corporate Commons, with a major tenant being the St Paul's School of Nursing.

The New York City Economic Development Corporation and the PANYNJ retain control over the available development acreage.

The campus was expanded with additional office and medical space a rooftop farm, and outdoor art installations in 2017.

== See also ==
- Telehouse America
- Teleport Communications Group
- West Shore, Staten Island
