= Hong Kong Internet Exchange =

Internet exchange point in Hong Kong

Hong Kong Internet eXchange
- Full name: Hong Kong Internet eXchange
- Abbreviation: HKIX
- Founded: April 1995; 30 years ago
- Location: Hong Kong
- Website: hkix.net
- Members: 311 (see Members)
- Peak in: 3.202 Tbit/s
- Peak out: 3.201 Tbit/s
- Daily in (avg.): 2.894 Tbit/s
- Daily out (avg.): 2.895 Tbit/s

Hong Kong Internet Exchange
- Traditional Chinese: 香港互聯網交換中心
- Simplified Chinese: 香港互联网交换中心
Transcriptions
Standard Mandarin
- Hanyu Pinyin: Xiānggǎng Hùliánwǎng Jiāohuàn Zhōngxīn
Yue: Cantonese
- Jyutping: hoeng1 gong2 wu6 lyun4 mong5 gaau1 wun6 zung1 sam1

Hong Kong Internet eXchange (HKIX; Chinese: 香港互聯網交換中心) is an internet exchange point in Hong Kong. The cooperative project is initiated by the Information Technology Services Centre (ITSC) of the Chinese University of Hong Kong (CUHK) providing the service free of charge. It is now operated by HKIX Limited, a wholly owned subsidiary of the CUHK Foundation.

The aim of the HKIX is to connect Internet service providers (ISPs) in Hong Kong so that intra-Hong Kong traffic can be exchanged locally without routing through the US or other countries. 99% internet interaction in Hong Kong goes through the centre, and HKIX acts as Hong Kong's network backbone. According to Cloudflare, HKIX is the largest internet exchange point in Asia.

== History ==
HKIX was founded in April 1995 by the Chinese University of Hong Kong. It reduced Hong Kong's reliance on US web servers and therefore made internet performance in Hong Kong faster.

In 2004, the HKIX2 back-up mirror site was created, which is located at CITIC Telecom Tower.

In 2009, HKIX announced their collaboration with Cisco Systems to deploy the Nexus 7000 series switch technology, marking HKIX the first among the world's leading internet exchanges.

As of 2013 the exchange handles 280 gigabits of information per second during its peak times every day. Chinese University stated that the amount of information is equivalent to 17,000 five-megapixel photographs. In 2013, Edward Snowden said that the National Security Agency gained access to the backbone and took data from it. Chinese University said that it did not find evidence of hacking.

In February 2017, it was announced that 3 more satellite sites were launched in data centres located in Fo Tan and Tseung Kwan O.

June 2020, HKIX added support for RPKI in order to enhance the security of HKIX routing.

In 2021, the HKIX1c was created, which is located at Cyberport on Hong Kong Island, running in active-active mode with independent power grid of HKIX1b.

In June 2024, HKIX1 was decommissioned, resulting in HKIX1b and HKIX1c becoming the two core sites.

== Background ==
The concept of an "Internet Exchange" is very important after the NSFNet Backbone faded away because IAPs had to be interconnected to maintain full connectivity to the entire Internet.

In Hong Kong, the situation is a little bit different. Many of the IAPs in Hong Kong have their own links to the US. They have to connect to each other locally only to have faster and less expensive access to local sites. In addition, there are some commercial Internet Exchanges in Hong Kong for routing traffic within the city.

== Facilities ==
=== Core sites ===
The HKIX1 was located on the Sha Tin campus of Chinese University. The door of the building that houses it has no sign. Danny Lee of the South China Morning Post said that the building that houses it is a "grey, bunker-like structure could easily pass for any other building" at the university. HKIX1 was decommissioned in June 2024.

HKIX1b is an extension to HKIX1 and was interconnected with HKIX1 by multiple 100 Gbit/s links. The data center is close to University station and is less than 2 km from HKIX1 (fiber distance). The main purpose of establishing HKIX1b is to offer dual-core for high availability and for supporting more port connections.

HKIX1c is a new core site replacing HKIX1. The data centre is located in Cyberport.

Current core sites, HKIX1b and HKIX1c, are running in active-active mode, providing power resilience, chassis resilience and site resilience.

=== Satellite sites ===
Name	Date of launch	Location	Owner	District	Ref.
HKIX2	24 August 2004	CITIC Telecom Tower	CITIC Telecom	Kwai Chung	
HKIX3	28 February 2017	SUNeVision iAdvantage Data Center	SUNeVision	Fo Tan	
HKIX4	19 June 2017	NTT Com Asia Data Centre	NTT Communications	Tseung Kwan O Industrial Estate	
HKIX5	24 March 2017	Telehouse Hong Kong CCC Data Centre	KDDI	Tseung Kwan O Industrial Estate	

== Members ==
As of December 2025, there are 311 participants connecting to the HKIX. The following are some of the major participants.

- Amazon
- Akamai
- China Mobile
- CloudFlare
- Facebook
- Google
- Hong Kong Broadband Network
- Microsoft
- Netflix
- Tencent
- TVB
- Yahoo
- Zoom Communications

== See also ==
- List of Internet exchange points
