= Luxembourg Internet Exchange =

The Luxembourg Internet eXchange (LU-CIX) is a facility for Internet Service Providers (ISPs) based in Luxembourg, allowing them to interconnect within Luxembourg and hence improve connectivity and service for their customers. The LU-CIX is an association with a neutral and open philosophy.

== See also ==
- Luxembourg Commercial Internet eXchange (LU-CIX)
