= .lu =

Internet country code top-level domain for Luxembourg

- Introduced: 27 January 1995
- TLD type: Country code top-level domain
- Status: Active
- Registry: DNS-LU
- Sponsor: RESTENA
- Intended use: Entities connected with Luxembourg
- Actual use: Popular in Luxembourg
- Registered domains: 114,506 (date where the above number applies)
- Structure: Registrations are made directly at the second level
- Documents: Charter
- DNSSEC: yes
- Registry website: DNS-LU

.lu is the Internet country code top-level domain (ccTLD) for Luxembourg. .lu domains are administered by RESTENA. Since 1 February 2010, the administrative contact does not need to be based in Luxembourg.

== History ==
For many years, applications for .lu domains could be made only via postal mail or fax. The fees for a .lu second level domain are €40 for the creation (or modification of a contact) and €40 yearly (including VAT). On 18 September 2006, the registry introduced a domain name registrar model. While the classic paper registration is possible, registering with a certified registrar is preferred by RESTENA.
