= European Commercial Internet Exchange =

European Commercial Internet Exchange (ECIX)
- Abbreviation: ECIX
- Founded: 2002
- Location: Berlin, Düsseldorf, Frankfurt am Main, Hamburg, Germany, Munich, (Nürnberg, Amsterdam)
- Website: www.ecix.net
- Members: 174 As of April 2013
- Peak: 1123.4 Gbits/s As of April 2017
- Daily (avg.): daily average 100 Gbits/s As of January 2016

European Commercial Internet Exchange (ECIX) is a brand name of PEERING GmbH. The headquarters is in Berlin. PEERING GmbH is a commercial organisation operating the ECIX. There are three POP's in Germany with more than 150 members and peak traffic higher than 700 Gbit/s, making it the second largest IXP in Germany by membership and traffic. ECIX currently operates an Extreme Networks and Brocade infrastructure with 1-100 Gbit/s links.

== Amsterdam ==
- Telecity 2

== Berlin ==
- Prosite / Speedbone, Alboinkontor
- Mesh (Level 3 Communications), Gradestraße 60
- Carrier Colocation / I/P/B, Lützowstraße 105/106

== Düsseldorf ==
- Interxion Düsseldorf
- Mesh (Level 3 Communications)
- Fibre1/MyLoc
- Equinix

== Frankfurt am Main ==
- Interxion
- Equinix, Kleyerstraße
- TeleCity

== Hamburg ==
- Level 3 Communications
- N@twork, Wendenstraße 379, 1.OG
- GlobalConnect, Wendenstraße 379, 3.OG
- IPHH, Wendenstraße 408
