= DATAIX =

Internet exchange network

- Full name: DATAIX
- Founded: 2009
- Website: www.dataix.ru
- Members: 500
- Ports: 3774
- Peak: 5,3 Tbit/s

DATAIX is an Internet exchange network between telecom operators and content generators in Europe and Asia. According to the Internet Exchange Report by Hurricane Electric Internet Services, DATAIX is one of the largest networks in the world by the number of participants. Its peak traffic, the size of which exceeds 5,3 Tbit/s. The headquarters of the company is located in Saint-Petersburg, Russia.

== History ==
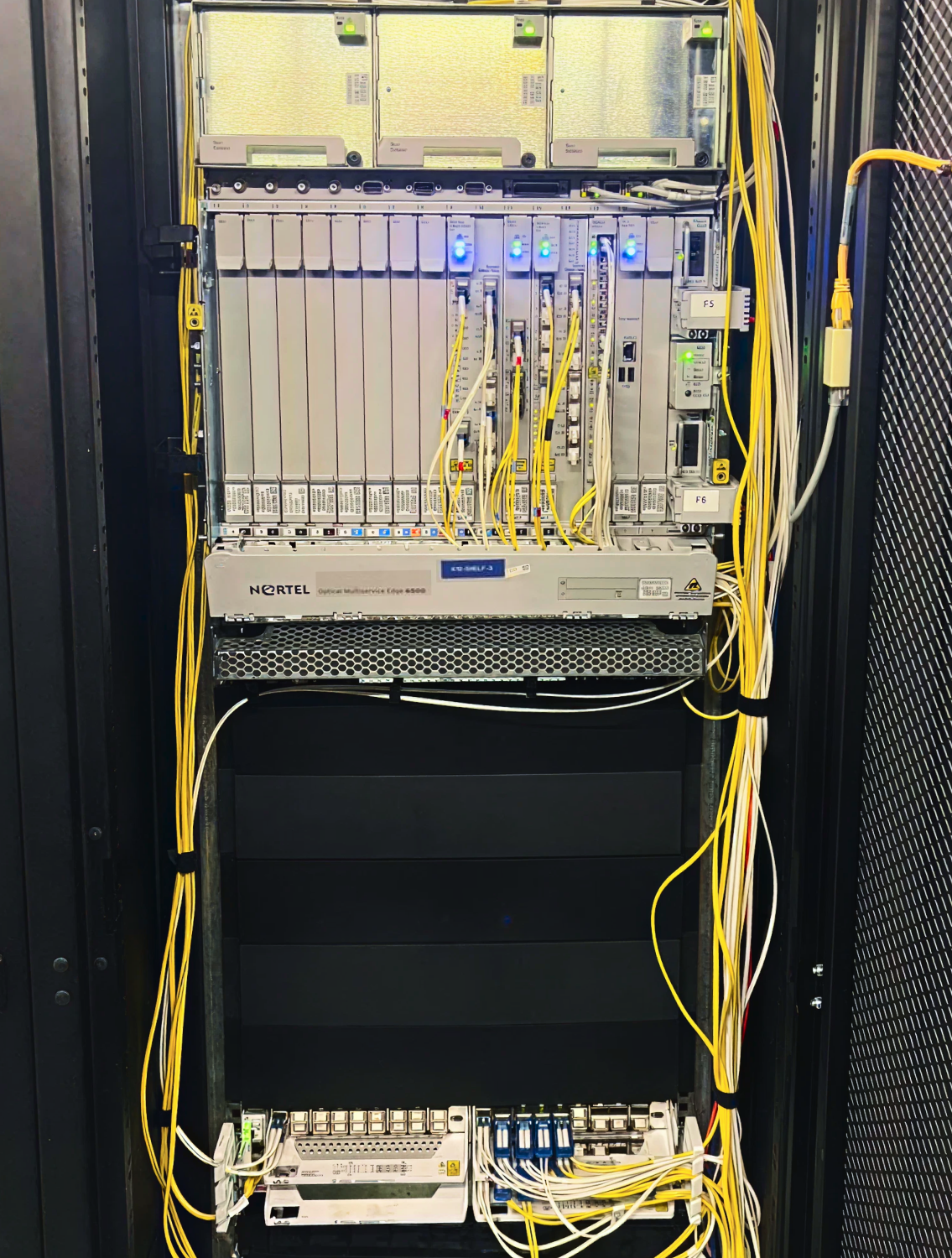
GlobalNet equipment at the K12 data center site in Saint Petersburg

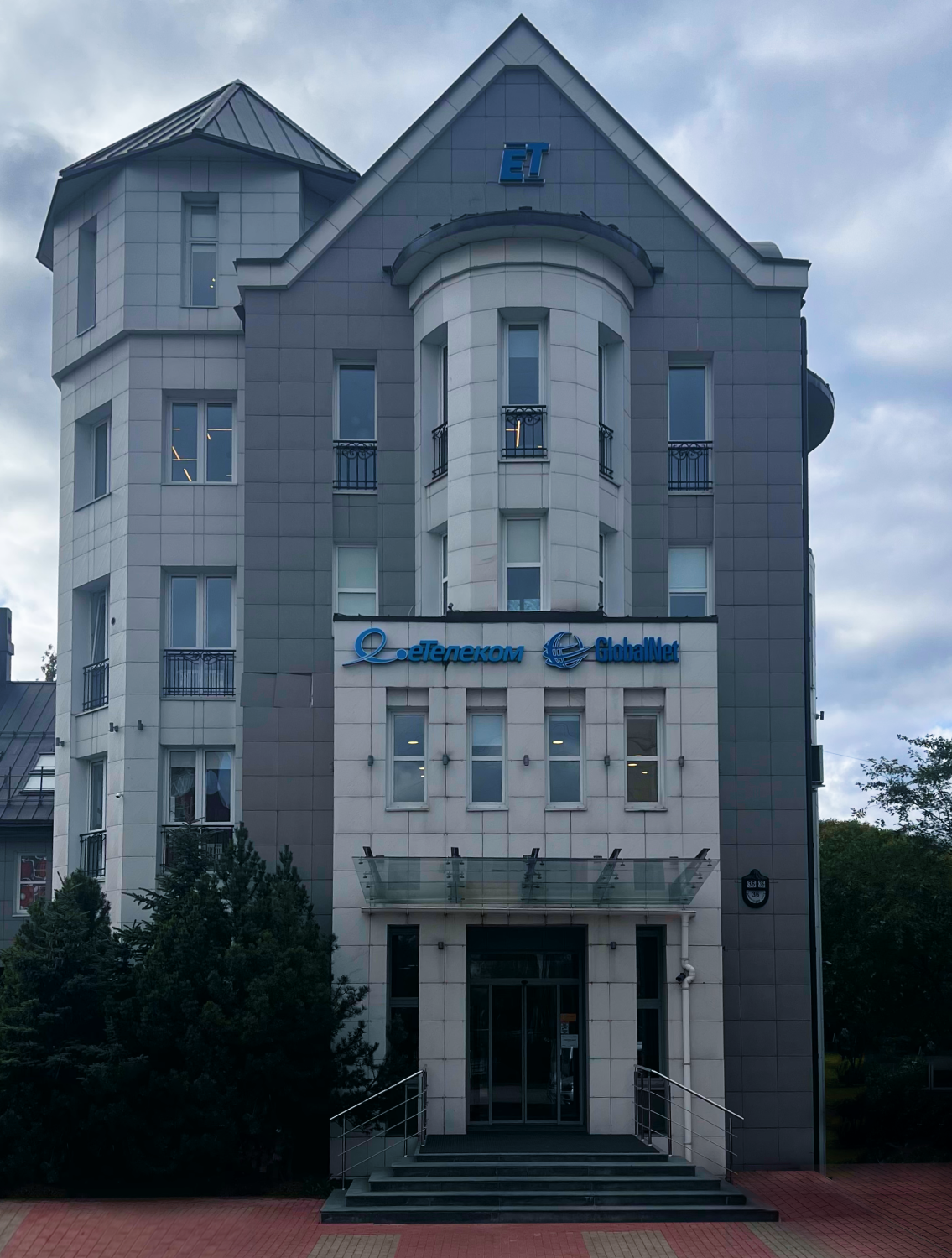
Dataix office, Saint-Petersburg

DATAIX was launched in 2009. The founders used their own money as investment. At the start, DATAIX purchased part of the fiber-optic network, and partly built it specifically for the project. Peering LLC, which owned the DATAIX network, was closely connected to the relatives of Pavel Durov: half-brother Mikhail Petrov, who worked at Selectel, and his mother Albina Durova (the latter owned 25.5% of the company from July 2012 to November 2013).

In 2013, a DATAIX point of presence was opened in Kyiv. DATAIX served the Ukrainian traffic of the VKontakte social network, with caching servers of the social network on the site. In the following years, DATAIX became a major player in the Ukrainian traffic market. In 2016, the largest telecommunications companies of the country Kyivstar and Ukrtelecom were connected to the DATAIX exchange point, and at that time up to 2 Tbit/s of traffic passed through it.

In 2015, the national operator of Moldova Moldtelecom was connected, becoming the fourth in the group of connected national operators (Ukrtelecom, Kazakhtelecom, and the National Traffic Exchange Center of Belarus). In the same year, Novatel, a member of Deutsche Telekom, joined the DATAIX network through a point in Frankfurt.

In 2016 DATAIX participants got the opportunity to establish a direct session with Hurricane Electric, the largest operator in the world in terms of the number of IPv4 and IPv6 prefixes. The maximum network load in 2016 was 2.2 Tbit/s.

In 2017, DATAIX officially entered the Euro-IX Internet exchange association, and also launched points of presence in Sweden (Stockholm) and Latvia (Riga).

In March 2018, it was announced that Global-IX and DATAIX are merging under the brand of the latter, but on the base of the GlobalNet infrastructure, which includes its own highway communication networks on the Stockholm-Helsinki-St. Petersburg-Moscow route. Companies are counting on the synergy effect of the GlobalNet MPLS network and the DATAIX traffic exchange point services.

In 2019, the number of PoPs in 7 countries increased from 28 to 34. Points of presence in Amsterdam, and Frankfurt am Main were added. As of December 2019, the total port capacity for clients is 59.431 Tbit/s. Another national operator, Uzbektelecom, has joined the DATAIX participants. In September 2020, the company launched a fiber-optic communication line along a short route along the M11 "Neva" expressway.

In March 2021, the IX DDoS Protection service was launched to protect participants of the DATAIX peer-to-peer network from DDoS. It is based on the IX Security 32 system and is available to DATAIX participants at no additional cost.

According to a PIPE-IX market research report presented at the CROS-2023 conference in May 2023, DATAIX had 233 unique ASN participants, the highest number among Russian internet exchange points.

== Network features ==
DATAIX connects the traffic of telecom operators and content generators in Russia, Europe and Asia. 48 points of presence in a united traffic exchange network are located in seven countries:

- Ukraine
- Kazakhstan
- Germany
- Sweden
- Finland
- Russia
- Netherlands

The total length of the networks is more than 10 thousand km, and the total throughput capacity of external channels reaches 5,3 Tbit/s.

In 2021, the number of network members exceeded 500 ASNs, 80% of which are telecom operators and 20% are content generators. ASIMO Networks (AS49127) became the 500th member of the DATAIX peer-to-peer network by the end of the year.

In 2021, the company built new DWDM backbone infrastructure between Stockholm – Copenhagen – Hamburg – Amsterdam – Frankfurt. The round-trip delay of the Amsterdam-Hamburg signal is 11.2 ms; Hamburg-Copenhagen is 4.5 ms; Copenhagen - Stockholm - 8.7 ms; Stockholm - Frankfurt will not exceed 20 ms. The company has also implemented 400G Ethernet technology in Stockholm, Frankfurt and Amsterdam.

By the end of 2021, the number of POPs in 8 countries has increased from 38 to 48. Points of presence have been added in the Netherlands, Germany, Sweden and Denmark. GlobalNet has fitted out its network with telecommunications equipment from global supplier Ciena, the latest WaveLogic 5 product line. According to Ciena (NYSE: CIEN), GlobalNet/DATAIX upgraded its fiber network to 800G wavelength capability, adding that Ciena provided the required coherent transmission technology.

== Events ==
DATAIX regularly takes part in meetings of the Internet exchange association Euro-IX, at GPF conferences (Global Peering Forum), EPF (European Peering Forum), ENOG (Eurasia Network Operators Group).

== See also ==
- List of Internet exchange points by size
