= Peering.cz =

Internet exchange point

Peering.cz is a commercial internet exchange point founded in Prague in 2013 by Czech internet entrepreneur Zdeněk Cendra. It operates a network of interconnection points in Prague, Bratislava, Vienna and Frankfurt, serving internet service providers, telecommunications companies and content networks in Central Europe.

As of 2026, Peering.cz reported 210 connected networks and a peak traffic rate of 5.071 terabits per second.

== Network ==
Peering.cz's 10 connection points.

- CE Colo Prague
- CE Colo DC7
- TTC Teleport Prague
- TTC DC2
- Sitel Bratislava
- DataCube Bratislava
- STU Bratislava
- Interxion Vienna
- Interxion Frankfurt
- Equinix Frankfurt

== See also ==
- List of Internet exchange points
