= 123Net =

123.Net Inc.
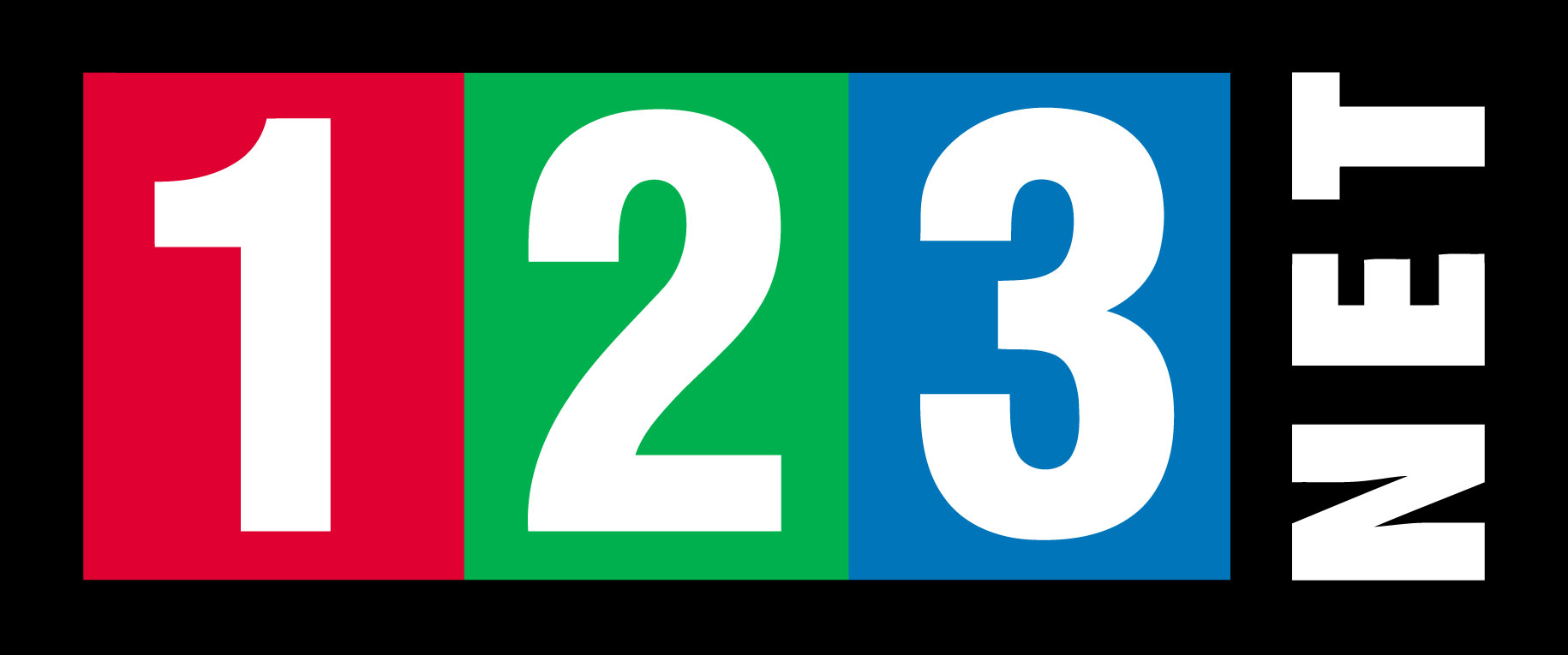
- Company type: Private
- Industry: Telecommunications
- Predecessor: LECMI Inc.; Internet 123 Inc.
- Founded: March 5, 1995; 31 years ago
- Headquarters: Southfield, Michigan, United States
- Owner: Grain Management; (2024–present)
- Number of employees: 350
- Website: 123.net

123.Net Inc., also known as 123NET, is a telecommunications company based in Southfield, Michigan, USA. Founded in 1995, it provides fiber internet, colocation, and business voice services.

The company operates a network spanning over 3,100 route miles of fiber, connecting major metropolitan areas across Michigan. 123NET manages the Detroit Internet Exchange (DET-iX), one of the largest fee-free internet exchanges in the world, and the Grand Rapids Internet Exchange (GRR-iX).

Even after having its controlling interest sold to Grain Management, 123NET continues to invest in expanding its high-density data centers and fiber infrastructure, with an emphasis on improving connectivity in underserved areas. The company is actively involved in public-private partnerships to support broadband expansion in Michigan.

In July 2024, a majority stake in the company was acquired by Grain Management, a private equity firm specializing in broadband infrastructure, although the original leadership retained a significant ownership share.

== Acquisitions ==
Since its founding, 123NET has made acquisitions including:

- T2 Communications of Holland, MI (April 2015)
- Michigan Network Services (October 2014)
- MICA.Net (July 2014)
- West Michigan Internet Services (January 2011)
- Waypoint Telecommunications and Fiber Networks (July 2010)
- Zing Networks (September 2009)
