= Mumbai IX =

Mumbai-based Internet exchange point

DE-CIX India
- Full name: DE-CIX India
- Abbreviation: Mumbai CH; Mumbai IX
- Founded: 15 August 2014
- Location: India, Mumbai, Navi Mumbai
- Website: www.de-cix.in
- Members: 634 as of July 2025
- Peak: 3 Tbit/s
- Daily (avg.): 770 Gbit/s

Mumbai Internet Exchange (Mumbai IX) is a subsidiary of the German Internet exchange point (IXP) DE-CIX, founded on 15 August 2014 as Mumbai Convergence Hub (Mumbai CH) as an Open Carrier Neutral Internet Exchange & Peering Hub. As of 30 March 2021 it interconnects more than 375 members, making it the largest IXP in India and surrounding region.

It's a subsidiary of Germany-based DE-CIX and is rebranded as DE-CIX Mumbai, not be confused with National Internet Exchange of India.

== Organisation ==
Mumbai Internet Exchange is composed of a non-profit association model focus on improving the experience of Indian internet users. It is currently run by DE-CIX and are currently serving 375+ members spread across all over India.

== Network ==
As of 30 March 2021, Mumbai Internet Exchange network has 8 PoP in Mumbai Urban.

- Web Werks Mum DC2, Rabale, Navi Mumbai.
- Netmagic DC 5, Chandivali, Mumbai.
- STT Telemedia DC( Tata LVSB ) Prabhadevi, Mumbai.
- GPX IDC, Chandivali, Mumbai
- Sify Rabale, Navi Mumbai
- Netmagic DC 6, Mumbai
- Netmagic DC 7, Mumbai
- GPX Mumbai 2, Mumbai

== Other Locations ==
DE-CIX Mumbai formerly known as Mumbai IX now holding national license has expanded its facilities to new cities in 2019, all data center and carrier neutral and allow the settlement free exchange of traffic. The new locations are:

- DE-CIX Delhi (ST Telemedia Banglasahib (Tata VSB))
- DE-CIX Chennai (Bharti Airtel Santhome)
- DE-CIX Kolkata (ST Telemedia Kolkata (Tata Communications))

== Ports of connection ==
Services are available through following types of port and several bandwidth options.

Port	Traffic
1 Gbit/s LX	traffic up to 100Mbit/s
1 Gbit/s LX	1G
10 Gbit/s LR	10G
100 Gbit/s	100G

== Services ==
Mumbai Internet Exchange offers the following professional services:

- Public peering: Unicast & multicast IPv4, unicast IPv6
- Private peering (Closed user group)
- Routes servers (with the communities feature)
- Web Portal: private login per member, personal detailed traffic statistics.
- 24/7 NOC

== Community ==
Mumbai Internet Exchange community comes from all around the world. Any organisation which owns an Autonomous System Number (also known as ASN) can be connected to Mumbai IX. The connected members of the Internet exchange point have various profiles:

- Social media
- Ecommerce
- ISP / Internet Access Providers / Telcos
- CDN Provider (Content Delivery Network)
- Hosting companies
- Cloud providers
- IPTV Networks
- Corporations
- DNS Root Server
- Email and Hosting

== Awards and recognition ==
Mumbai Internet Exchange was Recognized as a Top Digital Innovator at 2016 Digital India Summit in the Digital Start-up Innovators category.

Mumbai Internet Exchange was Recognized as a Top Digital Innovator at the 2017 Digital India Summit in the Digital Start-up Innovators category for the second year in a row.

In September 2017 Mumbai IX received the prestigious Open-IX Certification from the Open-IX Association, making the Mumbai IX Asia's only IXP with Open-IX certification for its state-of-the-art technical standards.

== See also ==
- List of Internet exchange points
- National Internet Exchange of India
- List of Internet exchange points by size
