= Stockholm Internet eXchange =

Internet exchange point in Sweden

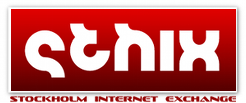
Name	Stockholm Internet eXchange
Abbreviation	STHIX
Founded	2005
Location	Sweden, Stockholm
Homepage	www.sthix.net
Participants	110
- Month Traffic
Max	259 Gbit/s
Average	116 Gbit/s

Stockholm Internet eXchange (STHIX) manages multiple carrier- and data center-neutral internet exchange point (IXP) situated in Copenhagen / Malmö, Gothenburg, Stockholm, Sundsvall, and Umeå. The Stockholm IXP is the second largest IXP in the region in terms of both bandwidth (average/peak) and number of members. Peak bandwidth is above 230 gigabits per second.

== History ==
STHIX was founded in 2005 and had its first members connected in late 2006. Since then the members count has grown to more than 120. It was initially located at two data centers in the Stockholm area (Telecity Bromma and Stokab KN1) with a 100 megabit interconnect and has since expanded to a total of 6 data centers in Stockholm, 1 in Gothenburg, 1 in Sundsvall, 1 in Umeå and 5 in Copenhagen/Malmö.

== Today ==
STHIX offers free 100M ports at all of the data centers, and 1G / 10G / 100G ports at a cost-effective price, compared to the competition in the region, while still delivering a highly reliable service. STHIX is based mainly on Arista Networks hardware.

== See also ==
- Netnod Internet Exchange i Sverige
- List of Internet exchange points
- List of Internet exchange points by size
