= Japan Network Access Point =

Internet exchange point in Japan

- Full name: Japan Network Access Point
- Abbreviation: JPNAP
- Founded: 2001
- Location: Japan
- Website: Official website

The Japan Network Access Point (JPNAP) is an Internet Exchange Point situated in Tokyo and Osaka, Japan. JPNAP was established on 2001 and operated by Internet Multifeed Co.

JPNAP is one of the largest Internet Exchanges in the world, by traffic. JPNAP provides 10 GE, GbE, FE interfaces and also provides Link aggregation. The Tokyo and Osaka sites are approximately 500km apart, but they are not connected. JPNAP network is already IPv4/v6 Dual-stacked. However, they also provide IPv6-only service through their Internet Exchange Point called JPNAP6.

== Technology ==
JPNAP has two distinguishing features : the first is "Automatically switched optical patch panel" and the other is "PeerWatcher".

When the "automatically switched optical patch panel" finds a failure in the IX switch, it switches patch cable to the other IX switch automatically. Even if the patch panel has power problems, there's no effect on the communication, except for the detection of IX switch status.

"PeerWatcher" shows a graph of the traffic between the two BGP routers faced on JPNAP network using sFlow.

== See also ==
- Internet in Japan
- List of Internet exchange points
- List of Internet Exchange Points by size
