= INRegistry =

Indian organization

.in Logo

INRegistry is the organisation responsible for the .in TLD and the native language internationalised domain name TLDs for the country. It was appointed by the government of India, and operates under the authority National Internet Exchange of India (NIXI).

== History ==
Most countries have their own Top Level Domain. The INRegistry has been created by NIXI, which is a Not-for-Profit Company under Section 25 of the Indian Companies Act, 1956, with the objective of facilitating improved Internet services in the country.

Under NIXI, the INRegistry functions as an autonomous body with primary responsibility for maintaining the .in ccTLD and ensuring its operational stability, reliability, and security. It will implement the various elements of the new policy set out by the Government of India and its Ministry of Communications and Information Technology, Department of Information Technology.

The Government decided to revamp the administration of the .in TLD in late 2004. INRegistry has assumed responsibility for the registry from the previous registry authority, The National Centre for Software Technology (NCST) and its Centre for Development of Advanced Computing (C-DAC). This change was announced via an executive order through a gazette notification issued by the Department of Information Technology (DIT), Government of India, according to a legal status to the INRegistry. This announcement also mentioned the role of the National Informatics Centre (NIC) as the registrar for gov.in domains, ERNET as the registrar for res.in and ac.in domains, and the Ministry of Defence as the registrar for mil.in domains.

INRegistry does not carry out registrations itself. Instead, it accredits registrars through an open process of selection on the basis of transparent eligibility criteria.

== Domains ==
The registry has formulated new policies for the registration and administration of .in domain names. The goal is to make .in domain names easier to use, and a way of making the Internet available to more Indian citizens. These policies generally took effect on January 1, 2005.

== Prices ==
Accredited registrars are free to set whatever retail prices they wish.

== Available names ==
Unlimited registrations are available in the following zones. Registration is available free to all parties worldwide, and there are no nexus or other qualifications:

- .in (available to anyone; used by companies, individuals, and organizations in India)
- .co.in (originally for banks, registered companies, and trademarks)
- .firm.in (originally for shops, partnerships, liaison offices, sole proprietorships)
- .net.in (originally for Internet service providers)
- .org.in (originally for non-profit organisations)
- .gen.in (originally for general/miscellaneous use)
- .ind.in (originally for individuals, companies)

Six zones are reserved for use by qualified institutions in India:

- .ac.in (Academic institutions)
- .edu.in (Educational institutions)
- .res.in (Indian research institutes)
- .ernet.in (Older, for both educational and research institutes)
- .gov.in (Indian government)
- .mil.in (Indian military)

=== Internationalised domain names and country codes ===
Logo for .भारत, launched on 27 Aug 2014

India plans to introduce internationalised domain names, that is domain names in 22 local languages used in India. These internationalised domain names will be used together with seven new top domains for India.

These top domains are:

- .भारत (Devanagari), became available on 27 Aug 2014 with the following zones:

Devanagari string	Transliterated string
भारत	.bharat
कंपनी.भारत	company.bharat
विद्या.भारत	vidya.bharat
सरकार.भारत	sarkar.bharat

The rest are also available (Seven scripts were previously launched in 2014):

- .भारत (Hindi, Bodo(Boro), Dogri, Konkani, Maithili, Marathi, Nepali, and Sindhi-Devanagari)
- .ভারত (Bengali)
- .ਭਾਰਤ (Gurmukhī)
- .ભારત (Gujarati)
- .இந்தியா (Tamil)
- .భారత్ (Telugu)
- .بھارت (Urdu)

== See also ==
- UDRP - Uniform Domain Name Resolution Policy suggested by ICANN
- InterNIC - The United States counterpart.
- National Internet Exchange of India

== .IN Domain Accredited Registrars ==
- HostRain
- Godaddy
- Bigrock
- Znetlive
- HIOX India
- SiliconHouse
- Hostao L.L.C
- BookYour.in
- Ipfy
- INDYADOT.com
- GrosoftLive
