= Amsterdam Internet Exchange =

Internet Exchange Point in the Netherlands

- Full name: Amsterdam Internet Exchange
- Abbreviation: AMS-IX
- Founded: 1997 (unofficially 1994)
- Location: Netherlands, Amsterdam
- Website: www.ams-ix.net
- Members: 882
- Ports: 1,493
- Peers: 1,316
- Peak in: 12.019 Tb/s
- Peak out: 12.075 Tb/s
- Daily in (avg.): 8.582 Tb/s
- Daily out (avg.): 8.619 Tb/s
- ASN: 6777

The Amsterdam Internet Exchange (AMS-IX) is an Internet exchange point based in Amsterdam, in the Netherlands. Established in the early 1990s, AMS-IX is a non-profit, neutral and independent peering point.

== History ==
Year	Peak traffic
2002	12 Gbit/s
2003	21 Gbit/s
2004	48 Gbit/s
2005	120 Gbit/s
2006	220 Gbit/s
2007	374 Gbit/s
2008	440 Gbit/s
2009	610 Gbit/s
2010	1 Tbit/s
2011	1.2 Tbit/s
2012	2 Tbit/s
2013	2.5 Tbit/s
2014	3.3 Tbit/s
2015	4.2 Tbit/s
2016	5.2 Tbit/s
2017	5.5 Tbit/s
2018	6.322 Tbit/s
2019	7.1 Tbit/s
2020	10.287 Tbit/s
2024	12 Tbit/s
2026	15 Tbit/s

In February 1994, a layer 2 shared infrastructure, used between academic institutes, was connected with CERN to exchange traffic. Other Internet service providers were allowed to connect and the name AMS-IX was first used. In 1997, the AMS-IX Association was founded by twenty of the connected Internet service providers and carriers.

In 2002, the NL-ix (formerly known as the Neutral Internet Exchange) was founded as an alternative or backup for the Amsterdam Internet Exchange.

In November 2008, the total amount of data transferred by month was an average of 75,940 TB incoming and outgoing. By April 2009, it had grown to 124,550 TB, 64% more in a 5-month period. As of 5 January 2011, AMS-IX connected 396 members on 684 ports and had a peak incoming traffic of 1.513 Tbit/s and outgoing traffic of 1.512 Tbit/s (compared to 0.833 Tbit/s average incoming and outgoing in January 2012). In November 2016, AMS-IX broke through the 5 Tbit/s ceiling.

These traffic speeds made the Amsterdam Internet Exchange the second largest Internet exchange in the world in 2010, when measured by number of connected members and by Internet traffic, next to the Deutscher Commercial Internet Exchange (traffic).

In September 2013, the board voted to create a legal framework to facilitate an expansion into the United States. An AMS-IX press release said that:

The chosen structure will need to protect AMS-IX's current operation and the AMS-IX Association's customers and members from commercial, legal, financial and technical risks and, more specifically, from interception activities by US government agencies.

SURFnet, a member of the exchange, had expressed its objection to the proposal, citing the possibility that such interception would be demanded.

AMS-IX has increased its average internet traffic from about 5 Tbit/s in March 2020 to about 7 Tbit/s in March 2021.

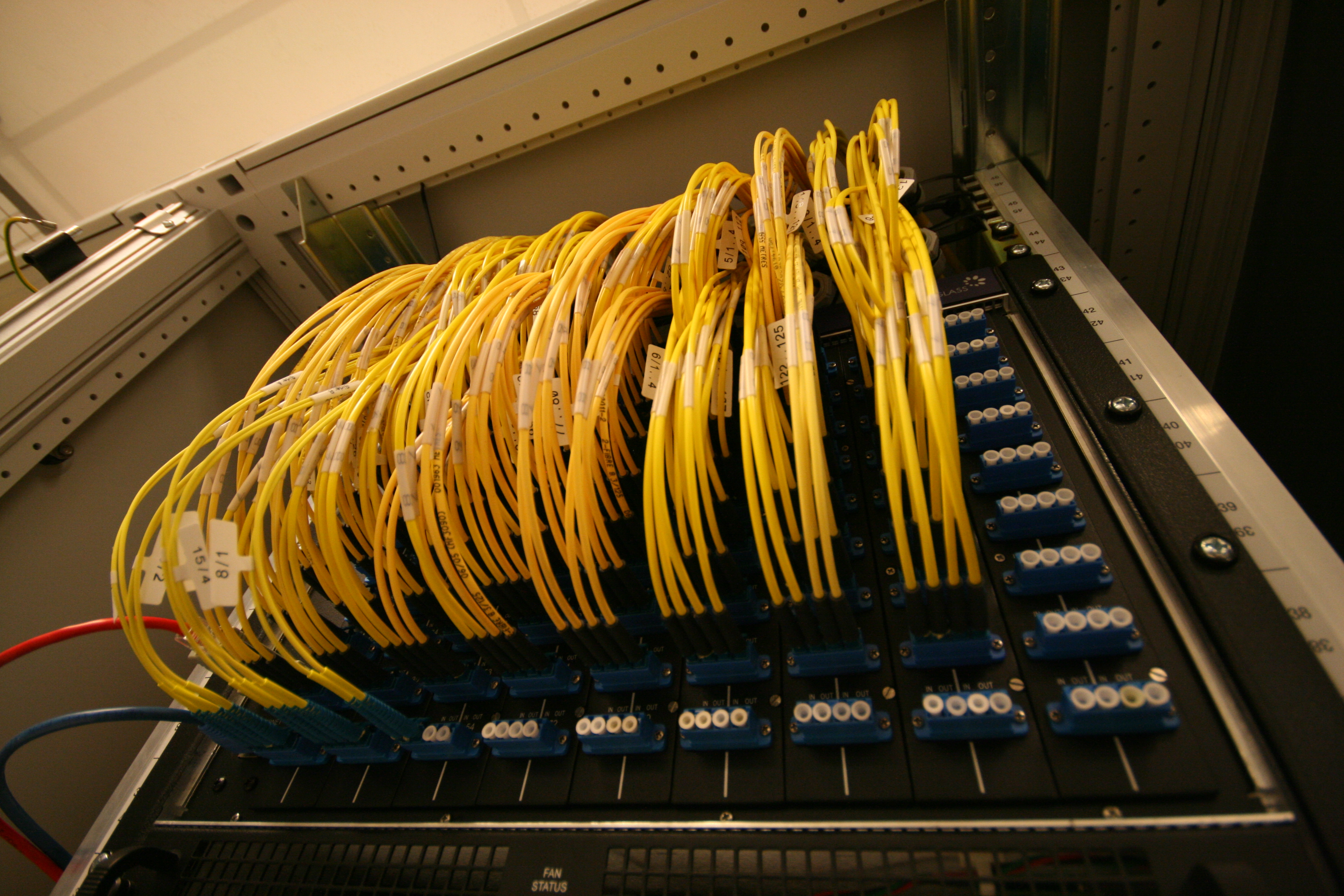
A fiber optic patch panel at the AMS-IX

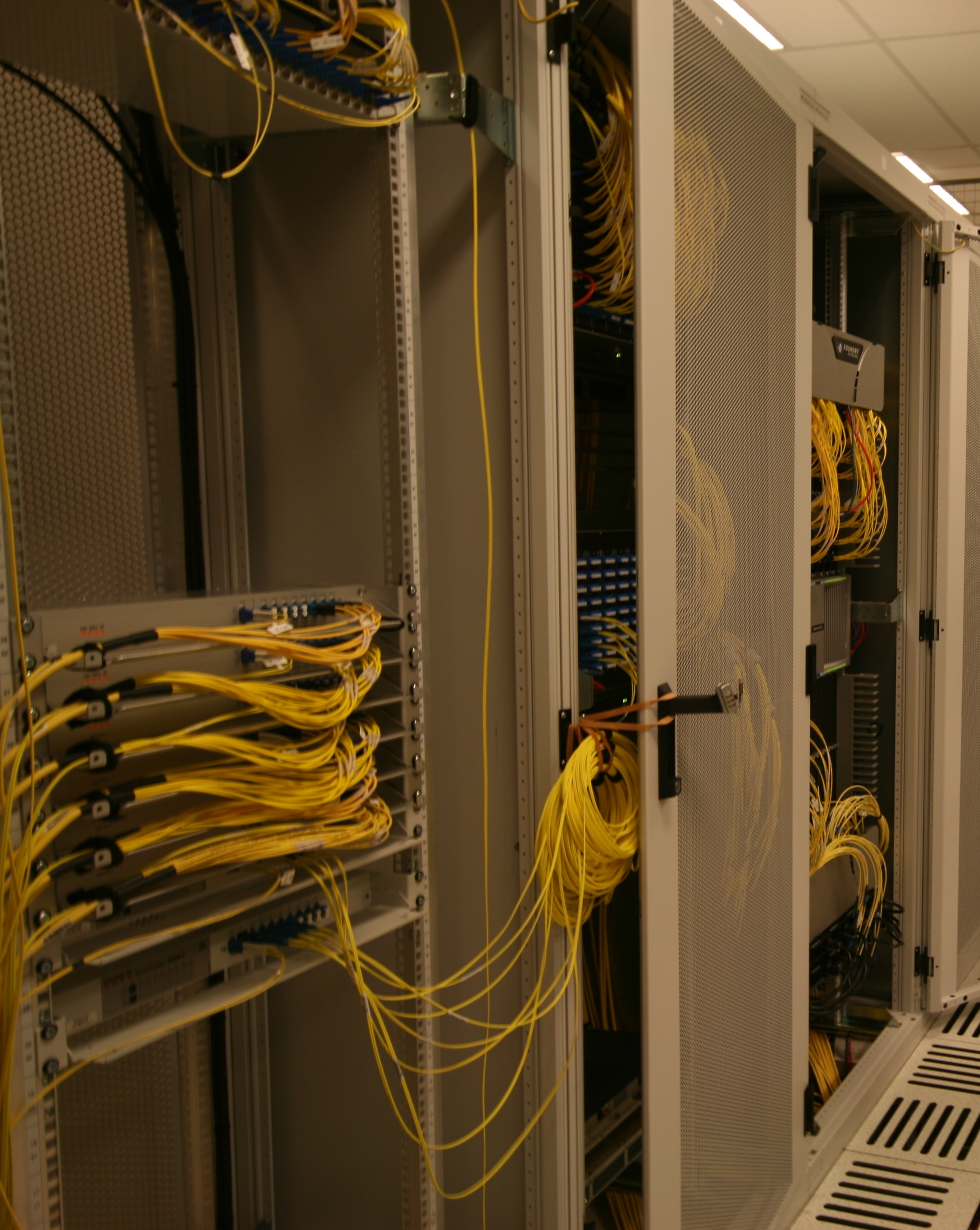
The AMS-IX core cage at euNetworks

== Co-locations ==
AMS-IX members are able to connect at 16 locations, all located within the greater Amsterdam/Rotterdam area:

- Digital Realty AMS5 (Formerly Interxion Schiphol Rijk)
- Digital Realty AMS9 (formerly Interxion Science Park, Vancis, SARA)
- Digital Realty AMS17
- Digital Realty AMS18 (formerly Telecity AMS4)
- Equinix AM1/2 (South East)
- Equinix AM3 (Science Park)
- Equinix AM5 (formerly TeleCity AMS5)
- Equinix AM6 (formerly TeleCity AMS6)
- Equinix AM7 (formerly TeleCity AMS2)
- euNetworks (Amsterdam Amstel Business Park)
- GlobalSwitch (Slotervaart)
- Greenhouse Datacenters
- Iron Mountain (formerly Evoswitch Haarlem)
- NIKHEF (Science Park Amsterdam)
- NorthC Amsterdam (Formerly Datacenter Group)
- SmartDC (Rotterdam)

Third-party network transport links also offer access to AMS-IX peering VLAN via "Reseller Program". Under the program, reseller could arrange one physical connection toward AMS-IX platform (now solely a 10G connection, but in prospect of going to 100G), and multiplexes "virtual-link" of other parties that connect to AMS-IX peering VLAN.

== Network ==
The AMS-IX platform is continually evolving due to its rapid growth in traffic and number of connected member ports. Up until the end of 2009, it was using a redundant hub-spoke architecture using a core switch and multiple edge switches. This double-star topology had the advantage of being able to perform maintenance on the network without any impact on customer traffic, and to anticipate on fiber and equipment problems by (automatically) switching to the backup topology as soon as a failure in one of the active components occurs. The active switching topology star is determined by means of the VSRP protocol. This topology is AMS-IX version 3.

However, since 2009; AMS-IX platform has migrated from a pure Layer2 network to a VPLS/MPLS network (using Brocade hardware) in order to cope with future growth (this is AMS-IX version 4).

AMS-IX members connect to the platform with 1, 10, 100 Gbit/s Ethernet connections, or using multiple gigabit or 10 gigabit aggregated ports, utilizing the 802.3ad standard. Gigabit Ethernet and lower speed ports are directly connected to Brocade - Foundry Networks BigIron 15000 or RX-8 network switches. 10 gigabit member ports are connected to Glimmerglass Systems photonic switches which maintain an optical connection to the stub switch on the currently active side of the network, following the VSRP protocol. For each 10-gigabit port there is an active and a backup stub switch, for which BigIron RX-8, RX-16 or NetIron MLX-16 switches are used. The core consists of two Brocade NetIron MLX-32 switches, to which all edge switches are connected using 10 gigabit aggregated connections and WDM technology.

With the new VPLS/MPLS setup; the BigIron RX and legacy BigIron 15000 are no longer in-use. AMS-IX has migrated all the hardware to the MPLS-capable MLX platform. Stub switch is either MLX-8, MLX-16 or MLX-32.

Since May 2011, AMS-IX engineers have started testing 100GE along with LimeLight Network.

== See also ==
- List of Internet exchange points
- Netherlands Internet Exchange (NL-ix)
