= ALP-IX =

Internet exchange point in Germany

Munich Regional Internet Exchange
- Full name: Munich Regional Internet Exchange
- Abbreviation: ALP-IX
- Founded: 2008
- Location: Munich, Germany
- Website: www.de-cix.net
- Members: 217
- Peak: 365.56 Gbit/s
- Daily (avg.): 155 Gbit/s

ALP-IX Regional Internet Exchange (ALP-IX) is an Internet Exchange Point situated in Munich, Germany). It is operated by DE-CIX Management GmbH. In 2011 the ALP-IX was renamed to DE-CIX Munich to be in line with their main brand.

ALP-IX operates on a Force10 TeraScale C300 switch and serves the Equinix "Hopfenpost" location as well as the Spacenet Datacenter at Landsberger Straße in Munich.

== See also ==
- List of Internet exchange points
