= Network-neutral data center =

Data centre which allows interconnection between multiple providers

A network-neutral data center (or carrier-neutral data center) is a data center (or carrier hotel) which allows interconnection between multiple telecommunication carriers and/or colocation providers. Network-neutral data centers exist all over the world and vary in size and power.

While some data centers are owned and operated by a telecommunications or Internet service provider, the majority of network-neutral data centers are operated by a third party who has little or no part in providing Internet service to the end-user. This encourages competition and diversity as a server in a colocation centre can have one provider, multiple providers or only connect back to the headquarters of the company who owns the server. It has become increasingly more common for telecommunication operators to provide network neutral data centers.

One benefit of hosting in a network-neutral data center is the ability to switch providers without physically moving the server to another location.
