= Telehouse America =

American telecommunications service provider

- Type: Private
- Industry: Telecom data center
- Headquarters: Staten Island
- Number of locations: New York City, Los Angeles, USA
- Area served: Global
- Products: Data Center; Managed Services; Peering Internet Exchanges Business Continuity
- Parent: KDDI

Telehouse America is a data center and colocation services provider in the United States with carrier-neutral facilities in New York City, Newark, and Los Angeles, as well as international Internet exchanges, managed IT services, and disaster recovery solutions. In 1996, Telehouse America launched the New York International Internet Exchange (NYIIX), Manhattan's largest and most heavily trafficked peering exchange point, as well as the Los Angeles International Internet Exchange (LAIIX), a peering gateway to the Asia-Pac Rim.

Together with its parent company, KDDI, and sister company, Telehouse Europe, Telehouse America operate a total of 48 Telehouse-branded data centers in 23 cities throughout Asia, Africa, North America, and Europe.

== Peering Exchanges ==
Telehouse America offers two metro peering connections: The New York International Internet Exchange, NYIIX, offers interface speeds up to 400Gbps and supports both IPv4 and IPv6. NYIIX is available from almost all the major carriers hotels in New York City, including 85 10th Avenue (TELEHOUSE Chelsea), 60 Hudson Street, 111 8th Avenue, 32 Avenue of the Americas, and 7 Teleport Drive in Staten Island.

== History ==
- 1983: Construction begins for the Teleport, the largest teleport project to date and eventual home to the Telehouse Center. Project aims to develop 100 acres for office space and 17 satellite earth stations for domestic communications and regional hook-up to regional fiber optic systems.
- 1987: Telehouse America was established by Dr. Yasuo Fukata, who is appointed as Company's First President and CEO.
- 1989: Telehouse Center (Staten Island, NY) becomes operational. It is custom designed to operate as a data center.
- 1996: NYIIX first becomes operational at Manhattan Center.
- 1997: Broadway Center (25 Broadway, NYC) becomes operational.
- 1998: Los Angeles Center (626 Wilshire Blvd., CA) becomes operational.
- 2000: LAIIX becomes operational in L.A. Center; Broadway Center is expanded.
- 2001: Internet Protocol version 6 (IPv6) peering offered at Broadway and L.A. Centers.
- 2003: Telehouse America launches additional NYIIX Point at 60 Hudson Street.
- 2004: Telehouse and Tiscali Partner with RIS Project to support Global Internet Community. Telehouse America is nominated for the "Intelligent Building of the Year Award" by the ICF (Intelligent Community Forum).
- 2005: Telehouse launches additional Internet Exchange point at 111 Eighth Avenue.
- 2007: Broadway Center expands power management capabilities, resulting in abundant, N+1 configuration.
- 2008: KDDI announces plans to expand its global data center business, which bears the Telehouse name, to 14 regions worldwide, giving Telehouse a presence in the following countries:

United States United Kingdom France Poland Belgium Philippines Hong Kong Japan China Singapore Vietnam Malaysia South Korea India

Additional NYIIX Connection Points Added to the Telehouse Center in Staten Island, 32 Ave of Americas in Manhattan, and 165 Halsey Street in Newark, NJ.

- 2009: Telehouse America launches IP Transit service. Company announces its global data center footprint and managed services at ITU Telecom World 2009.
- 2010: Telehouse expands its data center footprint in Shanghai with Telehouse China. Telehouse America announces IX Anywhere, proving global connections to the largest internal peering exchange points globally.

Telehouse expands its data center footprint to Hanoi, Vietnam.

- 2011: Telehouse America opens newest data center in New York City – Telehouse Chelsea Center, offering customers 60,000 square feet of colocation space.
- 2012: Telehouse launches its first data center in Frankfurt, Germany, marking the 43rd data center in the Telehouse global portfolio.
- 2013: Telehouse NYIIX extends its connectivity to 165 Halsey Street.
- 2015: TELEHOUSE expands NYIIX to 5 new locations: TORONTO, DALLAS, BOSTON, ASHBURN and CHICAGO.
- 2016: TRI-STATE LED COMPLETES LED RETROFIT OF NEW YORK DATA CENTERS FOR TELEHOUSE AMERICA.

== Services ==
- Call Center
- Colocation
- Cloud Link
- Data Centers
- Disaster Recovery
- Global Interlink
- Hardware Sales
- IP Transit
- Network Consulting
- Peering
- Ping Monitoring
- Tape Backup

== Data Centers ==
=== New York Teleport Data Center ===
The New York Teleport data center was opened in 1989, with 162,000 square feet of colocation space. Located in a 100-acre office park on Staten Island, operated by the Port Authority of New York and New Jersey, it is 17 miles from Manhattan.

=== Chelsea Data Center ===
Located in Manhattan, at 85 10th Avenue, it offers 60,000 square feet of Tier 3 colocation space. Connected to the Telehouse owned New York International Exchange, the Chelsea Data Center provides direct access to over 60 major carriers and over 160 peering members. This colocation facility is designed and built for financial, IT and highly corporate service industries managing business-critical data.

=== Los Angeles Data Center ===
The Los Angeles data center, also known as 626W, is home to the LAIIX (Los Angeles International Internet Exchange).
