= Lyon Internet Exchange =

Internet exchange point in France

- Founded: 2001
- Location: France, Lyon
- Website: Official website

LyonIX is the Internet eXchange point (IXP) of Lyon. LyonIX is managed by Rezopole, the non-profit organization supported by the Métropole de Lyon and the Auvergne – Rhône-Alpes region.

== Origin ==
LyonIX was founded in 2001. The Inauguration of the first Internet eXchange point, LyonIX 1 was in 2003. In 2007 LyonIX 2 was created, then LyonIX 3 in 2014. Two new points of presence, LyonIX 4 and 5 are installed in 2015.

== Functioning ==
LyonIX is the Internet eXchange point (IXP) of Lyon and managed by the non-profit Rezopole. The IXP develops a Very High-Speed Internet in Lyon. LyonIX is also a NAP (Network Access Point), a market place which allows members to buy or sell Internet transit and/or any layer 2 or IP services.

== Members ==
Any actor who has an 'Autonomous System' number can be connected to LyonIX.

The members connected to IXP NAP are :

- ISP (Internet service provider);
- Internet operators for companies;
- datacenters;
- e-commerce websites;
- large private companies;
- large public institutions.

== LyonIX infrastructure ==
Nowadays LyonIX operates 5 sites geographically located at a distance more than 10 kilometres from each other : LyonIX 1 is on the North of Lyon in Villeurbanne, LyonIX 2 is on the South of the agglomeration in Vénissieux, at SFR, and LyonIX 3 is on the West at DCforDATA, LyonIX 4 at the Bron airport, LyonIX 5 at the Lyon Saint-Exupéry airport in Colombier-Saugnieu (under construction).

The members connected to those five points can exchange the data through peering, fluidify their traffic and develop their activities based on the Internet Protocol utilisation.

== Services ==
=== Public services ===
The IXP gives an opportunity to the members of LyonIX to peer with the other members. These IXP are interconnected to other IXP in France or abroad.

LyonIX is the Internet eXchange point (IXP) of Lyon. It allows to the local economic actors (telecommunication operators, ISP, IT Services & Software Engineering, public institutions, large companies) to peer.

=== Services for members ===
The members can be connected with :

- 10/100/1000 Mbs copper support
- 1/10 Gbit/s fibre support

=== Other services ===
- Access to « Route Servers ».
- Peering between the members via VLAN;
- VLAN for other use (purchase / sale, transit, voice, collection);
- Network equipment hosting services.

LyonIX is also a NAP (Network Access Point), that allows a purchase and sale of Internet and Telecommunications services.

== Partners ==
LyonIX is managed by Rezopole and supported by the Métropole de Lyon and the Auvergne – Rhône-Alpes region.

== See also ==
=== Connected articles ===
- Internet Exchange Point
- Peering

=== External links ===
- Rezopole website
- Grand Lyon website
- Auvergne – Rhône-Alpes region website
