= Detroit Internet Exchange =

Nonprofit internet exchange

- Abbreviation: DET-iX
- Founded: 2014
- Location: Southfield, Michigan
- Website: detroitix.com
- Members: 67
- Peers: 81
- Peak: 1866.9 Gbit/s As of November 2023
- Peak in: 1866.9 Gbit/s As of November 2023
- Peak out: 1866.9 Gbit/s As of November 2023
- Daily (avg.): 1000.1 Gbit/s As of November 2023
- Daily in (avg.): 1000.1 Gbit/s As of November 2023
- Daily out (avg.): 1000.1 Gbit/s As of November 2023

Detroit Internet Exchange ("DET-iX") is a nonprofit 501(c)(6) Internet exchange point (IXP) located in Southfield, Michigan. It was founded in 2014 to help establish peering for local and regional Internet service providers. DET-iX currently has 67 members and 81 connections, with a maximum peak transfer speed of 1866.9 Gbit/s. DET-iX is the first peering exchange of its kind in the Detroit area.

The DET-iX switching fabric consists of multiple high capacity switches interconnected together. DET-iX members connect via 1, 10, 25 or a 100G ports. Members can pass traffic directly between one another, rather than purchasing through a third party provider. Further, the traffic stays local via the IXP as opposed to being routed in another major city.

== See also ==
- List of Internet exchange points
- List of Internet exchange points by size
