= Jio effect =

Internet expansion by Jio Telecom in India

The Jio effect refers to the period of digital transformation in India beginning in September 2016, following the commercial launch of Jio. There were major changes in the telecom industry as a result of a reduction in the cost of data and various other factors.

== Background ==
Prior to 2016, the Indian market was dominated by 2G and 3G technologies, with average prices ranging from ₹200 to ₹300 per gigabyte (GB). In 2015, less than 25% of the Indian population had regular access to the internet, and rural connectivity remained low.

Reliance Industries, led by its Chairman Mukesh Ambani, invested approximately ₹1.5 trillion ($22 billion) to build a greenfield, all-IP (Internet Protocol) 4G network. Unlike its competitors, Jio's infrastructure did not support legacy 2G or 3G circuits, focusing entirely on Voice over LTE (VoLTE).

== Launch ==
Jio launched its services commercially on 5 September 2016. To attract users, the company's "welcome offer" provided free unlimited 4G data, voice calls, and SMS until 31 December 2016 (later extended to March 2017 as the "Happy New Year Offer"). Following the free period, Jio introduced tariffs at approximately ₹10–₹50 per GB, over 90% cheaper than prevailing market rates. Jio made domestic voice calls free for life, in contrast to the industry's revenue model, which previously relied on voice calls for 75% of its earnings. Jio reached 16 million subscribers in its first month and 100 million within 170 days.

== Impact ==
Within six months of Jio's launch, India's monthly mobile data consumption rose from 200 million GB to over 1 billion GB. The entry of Jio led to significant changes in industry; as some brands were unable to compete with Jio's pricing, several operators merged or exited the market. Operators including Reliance Communications (RCom) and Aircel eventually filed for bankruptcy, while Vodafone India and Idea Cellular merged to form Vodafone Idea (VI). The only major operator that saw no significant change was Bharti Airtel, which acquired the consumer mobile businesses of Tata Docomo and Telenor India.

According to a report by CyberMedia Research, rural areas accounted for approximately 83 million of India's 238 million 4G subscribers (35%) in December 2017. The report also found that Jio had gained 88 million subscribers during 2017, while incumbent operators collectively gained 64 million.

Lower mobile data prices increased access to internet-based services in India. A 2018 study by the Institute for Competitiveness identified education, health care, entertainment and banking among the services offered through Jio's digital platform. The growth of mobile internet use was also accompanied by increased social media adoption. In 2018, The Economic Times reported an estimated 70 million additions to the user bases of social media platforms, including Facebook and YouTube, during the first year following Jio's launch. By October 2026, India had the world's largest advertising audiences for both YouTube and Facebook, according to Statista.

In 2018, the Institute for Competitiveness also projected that increased internet penetration resulting from Jio's entry into the telecommunications market could raise India's GDP per capita by approximately 5.65%, assuming other economic conditions remained unchanged. The institute also estimated that lower mobile data prices saved Indian consumers approximately ₹60,000 crore annually. This estimate was based on monthly savings of ₹142 per user, assuming 1 GB of data consumption per month among 350 million mobile internet users.

== See also ==
- Telecommunications in India
- Digital India
- Reliance Industries
- Jio
- Bharti Airtel
