= Interxion =

European datacenter and backbone operator

- Type: Naamloze vennootschap
- Founded: 1998
- Headquarters: Amsterdam, Netherlands
- Key people: David Ruberg; Chief Executive
- Products: Data centre: equipment housing, carrier and cloud-neutral data centre, managed services, connectivity, colocation centre, hosting environment, vendor-neutral data centre, network-neutral data center
- Revenue: € 561.8 million (2018)
- Number of employees: 500+(FTE)
- Parent: Digital Realty
- Website: Interxion official website

Interxion (/ɪntəˈrɛkʃən/ in-tə-REK-shən;) is a provider of carrier and cloud-neutral colocation data centre services in Europe. Founded in 1998 in the Netherlands, the firm was publicly listed on the New York Stock Exchange from 28 January 2011 until its acquisition by Digital Realty in March 2020. Interxion is headquartered in Schiphol-Rijk in the Netherlands, and operates 53 data centres in 11 European countries located in major metropolitan areas, including Dublin, London, Frankfurt, Paris, Amsterdam, and Madrid, the six main data centre markets in Europe, as well as Marseille, Interxion’s Internet Gateway.

== Operations ==
The company's core offering is carrier-neutral co-location, which includes provision of space, power and a secure environment in which to house customers’ computing, network, storage and IT infrastructure. Interxion also provides a number of additional services, including systems monitoring, systems management, engineering support services, data back-up and storage.

Within its data centres, Interxion enables approximately 1,500 customers to house their equipment and connect to a broad range of telecommunications carriers, ISPs and other customers.

== History ==
European Telecom Exchange BV was incorporated on 6 April 1998, and (after being renamed Interxion Holding B.V. on 12 June 1998) was converted into Interxion Holding N.V. on 11 January 2000. Interxion completed its IPO on the New York Stock Exchange (NYSE) on 28 January 2011. Interxion was founded by Bart van den Dries. The first round of venture capital was provided by Residex together with some informal investors.

In February 2015, it was announced that UK-based data center operator Telecity would merge with Interxion, purchasing it in a $2.2 billion deal, thus creating a joint data-center operator, with a combined value of $4.5 billion. According to the two CEOs, a deal promised to deliver around $600 million in synergy savings. In May 2015, US data company Equinix announced it would be acquiring TelecityGroup for £2.35 billion ($3.6 billion), which would terminate Telecity's deal with Interxion.

On 15 October 2015 the Montreuil Tribunal administratif (administrative tribunal) ordered Interxion to stop using the La Courneuve data centre because of noise pollution concerns raised by the inhabitants.

In October 2019, Digital Realty and Interxion announced the acquisition of Interxion by Digital Realty for $8.4 billion to "create a leading global provider of data centre, colocation and interconnection solutions".

In November 2019, Interxion announced a new contract deployment from global Infrastructure-as-a-Service provider Voxility for its campus in Madrid, reaching more than 90 carriers in this hub alone.

In Q1 2020, Interxion acquired 70% of icolo.io, a Kenyan data centre company and in 2021 acquired controlling stakes of Medallion, a leading data centre operator in Nigeria.

== Industry standards and accreditations ==
Interxion is certified with BS 25999, the British Standards Institution (BSI) standard for business continuity management. This has been integrated with Interxion's existing Information Security Management System (ISMS) certification ISO 27001:2005 standard for all of its European country operations. The company's European Customer Service Centre (ECSC) team has been trained in ITIL v3, the latest ITIL standard.

BS 25999 is the world's first business continuity management (BCM) standard, developed to minimise the risks of disruptions, which can impact a business. The standard is designed to keep businesses operational during challenging times by protecting staff, preserving reputations and providing the ability to keep trading.

Interxion's development of a BCM system involved integrating with the already established Information Security Management System, ISO 27001, an internationally recognised certification designed to assess levels of risk across an entire company's data centre network.

=== Awards ===
In 2010 Interxion's Technology and Engineering Group was recognised for its "Outstanding Contribution to the Data Centre Sector" at the sixth annual Data Centre Europe awards ceremony held at Espaces Antipolis in Nice, France. Interxion was nominated in the Green I.T. Awards 2011 as a finalist for "IT Operator of the Year".

=== Memberships ===
Interxion is a member of the following organisations:

- RIPE
- Euro-IX
- Irish Internet Association
- The Green Grid – Contributor Member
- The Green Grid – Advisory Council
- The Uptime Institute

== Co-location services ==
=== Energy efficiency ===
After joining the Green Grid association in 2008 and becoming a Contributor Member and part of the Advisory Council, Interxion has committed to continuously investigate efficiency opportunities such as free cooling as standard, ground water cooling, and waste heat re-use.

== Connectivity ==
Interxion connects to more than 400 individual carriers and ISPs as well as 18 European Internet exchanges. This is part of the carrier-neutral data centre concept.

=== Carriers ===
Interxion hosts global Tier 1, regional Tier 2 and national Tier 3 networks with direct access to the backbone infrastructure and PoP’s for over 400 carriers across its European footprint. These carriers are present at Interxion’s data centres both to interconnect to other carriers and to use the customer communities within the data centres.

=== Internet exchanges ===
Internet exchanges are the major points on the Internet where networks interconnect. They serve as an exchange point for the traffic of the Internet via bi-lateral, settlement-free peering agreements. Interxion houses 18 such Internet exchanges in Europe. Interxion is a supporter of the public Internet exchanges and was an active participant in the creation of Euro-IX.

== See also ==
- Data center
- Cloud computing
- Colocation centre
- Internet exchange point
- Peering
