= National Internet Exchange of India =

Information technology organisation based in India

National Internet Exchange Of India
- Full name: National Internet Exchange of India
- Abbreviation: NIXI
- Founded: 19 June 2003
- Location: India
- Website: ix.nixi.in
- Members: 306
- Peak in: 393 Gbit/s
- Peak out: 392 Gbit/s
- Daily in (avg.): 370 Gbit/s
- Daily out (avg.): 365 Gbit/s

The National Internet Exchange of India (NIXI) is a non-profit company incorporated under Section 25 of the Companies Act, 1956 (now section 8 under Companies Act, 2013) with an objective of facilitating improved internet services in the country.

== History ==
Registered on 19 June 2003, its primary purpose is to facilitate exchange of domestic internet traffic between the peering ISPs, Content players and any other organisations with their own AS number. This enables more efficient use of international bandwidth, saving foreign exchange and also improves the quality of service (QoS) for internet users by avoiding multiple international hops and thus reducing latency.

Utilising servers routed through and administered by India, it also reduces the chances of Indian data being intercepted unlawfully by NSA and GCHQ. NIXI is managed and operated on a neutral basis and currently has 40 operational network operations center (NOCs) located in multiple parts of the country.

Since 2005, NIXI has also created INRegistry (.in domain) as its autonomous body for maintenance of .IN domain.

Since December 2012, NIXI also manages the National Internet registry of the country delegation Internet Protocol addresses (IPv4 and IPv6) and autonomous system numbers to its affiliates.

Effective from 27 December 2021, bulk domain registrations, with individuals registrant registering for more than 2 or an entity registering for more than 100 .in domains are required to seek prior approval from the CEO of National Internet Exchange of India.

Since April 2025, foreign registrars offering .IN domains are required to appoint an Indian representative with a local office, official phone number, and email address for all formal communications. This mandate ensures local accountability and smoother coordination with Indian authorities.

== See also ==
- List of Internet exchange points
- Internet in India
