= Luxembourg Commercial Internet eXchange =

Internet exchange point in Luxembourg

Luxembourg Internet eXchange
- Full name: Luxembourg Internet eXchange
- Abbreviation: LU-CIX
- Founded: 2009
- Location: 202, Z.A.E. Wolser F 3290 Bettembourg, Luxembourg
- Website: www.lu-cix.lu
- Members: 84

The Luxembourg Internet eXchange (stylised as LU-CIX) is a carrier and neutral internet exchange point (IX) located in Luxembourg.

== History ==
LU-CIX was founded in February 2009 under the initiative on cross-industry players.

LU-CIX gathers together national and international telecommunications operators, data centre operators, ISPs and online businesses.

VoIP-X allows telephony providers to exchange voice traffic over the LU-CIX shared infrastructure using the SIP protocol.

LU-CIX is a member of Euro-IX (European Internet Exchange Association).

== Infrastructure ==
LU-CIX is hosted in 8 data centers, PoPs, across the country to facilitate the membership of a majority of Internet related players.

The traffic peak of LU-CIX is 475 Gbps.

LU-CIX has also built strong partnerships with other IX (Internet eXhanges) in neighboring countries to consolidate the peering community in Europe. It is possible to connect with operators located at BNIX(Belgium), MegaIX (Germany) and FranceIX(France).

LU-CIX also operates both Luxchat, the instant messaging solution for the general public and businesses, and Luxchat4Gov, the professional instant messaging solution for public sector agents, made available by the State.

== External link ==
- Official website
