= Point of presence =

Type of network boundary

A point of presence (PoP) is an artificial demarcation point or network interface point between communicating entities. A common example is an ISP point of presence, the local access point that allows users to connect to the Internet with their Internet service provider (ISP). A PoP typically houses servers, routers, network switches, multiplexers, and other network interface equipment that connects an ISP to customers including OLTs (optical line terminals) for fibre internet, and is typically located in a data centre. ISPs typically have multiple PoPs. PoPs are often located at Internet exchange points and colocation centres.

In the US, this term became important during the court-ordered breakup of the Bell Telephone system. A point of presence was a location where a long-distance carrier (IXC) could terminate services and provide connections into a local telephone network (LATA).

== See also ==
- Cable headend
- Content delivery network
- Meet-me room
- Telephone exchange
- Web cache
