= Colocation centre =

Data centre where servers from multiple customers are located

A colocation centre (also spelled co-location, or shortened to colo) or "carrier hotel", is a type of data centre where equipment, space, and bandwidth are available for rental to retail customers. Colocation facilities provide space, power, cooling, and physical security for the server, storage, and networking equipment of other firms and also connect them to a variety of telecommunications and network service providers with a minimum of cost and complexity. The term "carrier hotel" can refer to a data centre focused on connecting customer and carrier networks together. Colocation centres often host private peering connections between their customers, internet transit providers, internet service providers, cloud providers, meet-me rooms for connecting customers together Internet exchange points, and landing points and terminal equipment for fibre optic submarine communication cables, connecting the internet, for example at the network access point known as NAP of the Americas, which connects many Latin American ISPs with networks in the US.

== Configuration ==
Many colocation providers sell to a wide range of customers, ranging from large enterprises to small companies. Typically, the customer owns the information technology (IT) equipment and the facility provides power and cooling. Customers retain control over the design and usage of their equipment, but daily management of the data centre and facility are overseen by the multi-tenant colocation provider. They may also have a network operations centre (NOC), a help desk, and offices for customer employees, and they may offer remote hands or smart hands service in which on site technicians employed by the colocation provider are allowed to access customer equipment on request to solve customer issues. Some providers also provide roof access to customers for mounting wireless equipment.

- Cabinets – A cabinet is a locking unit that holds a server rack. In a multi-tenant data centre, servers within cabinets share raised-floor space with other tenants, in addition to sharing power and cooling infrastructure. Some providers sell half cabinets or quarter cabinets as well as space for single servers or rack units.
- Cages – A cage is dedicated server space within a traditional raised-floor data centre; it is surrounded by mesh walls and entered through a locking door. Cages share power and cooling infrastructure with other data centre tenants.
- Suites – A suite is a dedicated, private server space within a traditional raised-floor data centre; it is fully enclosed by solid partitions and entered through a locking door. Suites may share power and cooling infrastructure with other data centre tenants, or have these resources provided on a dedicated basis.
- Modules – data centre modules are purpose-engineered modules and components to offer scalable data centre capacity. They typically use standardised components, which make them easily added, integrated or retrofitted into existing data centres, and cheaper and easier to build. In a colocation environment, the data centre module is a data centre within a data centre, with its own steel walls and security protocol, and its own cooling and power infrastructure. "A number of colocation companies have praised the modular approach to data centers to better match customer demand with physical build outs, and allow customers to buy a data center as a service, paying only for what they consume."

== Building features ==
Buildings with data centres inside them are often easy to recognise by the amount of cooling equipment located outside or on the roof.

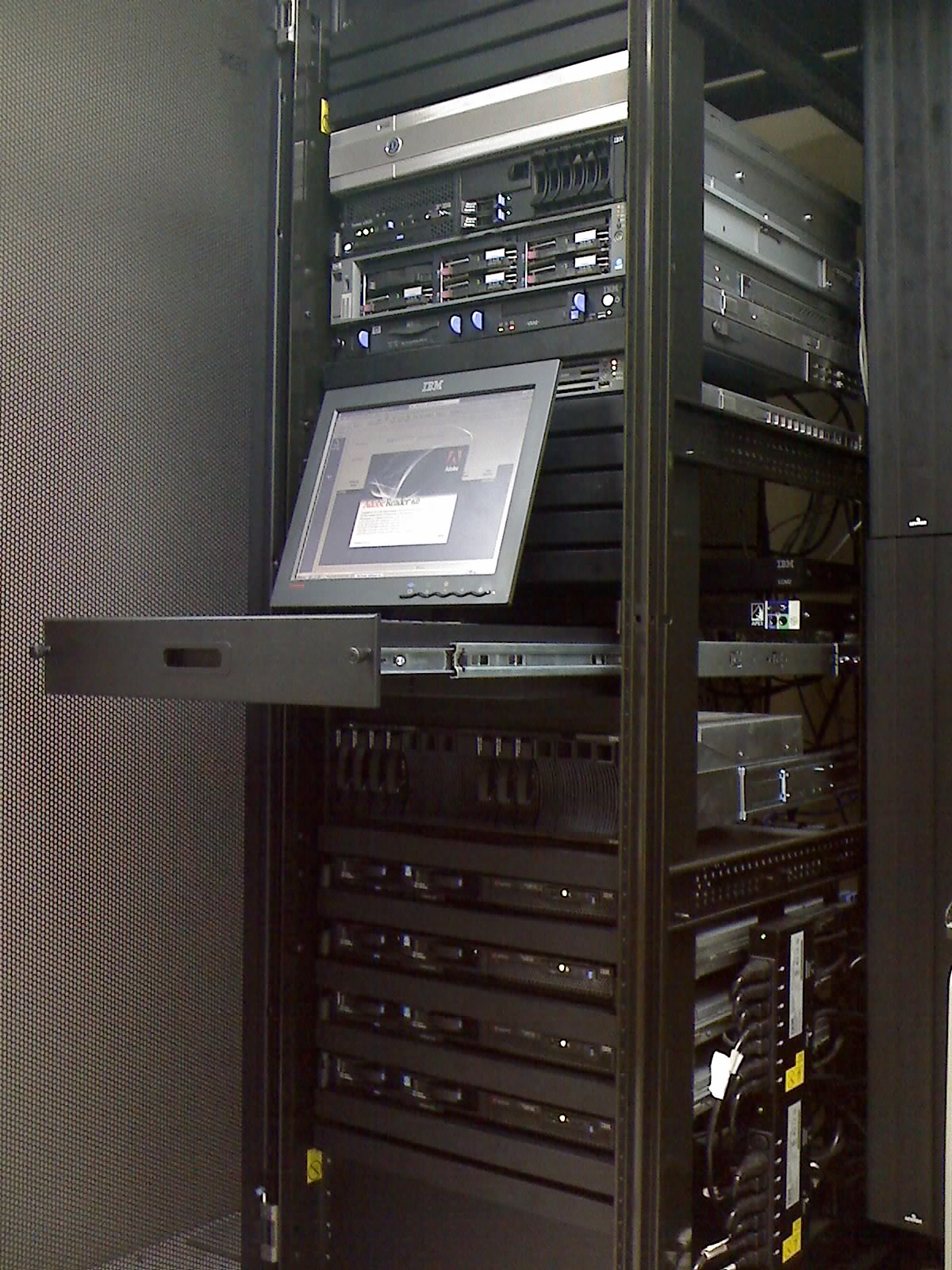
A typical server rack, commonly seen in colocation

Colocation facilities have many other special characteristics:

- Fire protection systems, including passive and active elements, as well as implementation of fire prevention programmes in operations. Smoke detectors are usually installed to provide early warning of a developing fire by detecting particles generated by smouldering components prior to the development of flame. This allows investigation, interruption of power, and manual fire suppression using hand held fire extinguishers before the fire grows to a large size. A fire sprinkler system is often provided to control a full scale fire if it develops. Clean agent fire suppression gaseous systems are sometimes installed to suppress a fire earlier than the fire sprinkler system. Passive fire protection elements include the installation of fire walls around the space, so a fire can be restricted to a portion of the facility for a limited time in the event of the failure of the active fire protection systems, or if they are not installed.
- 19-inch racks for data equipment and servers, 21-inch racks or 23-inch racks for telecommunications equipment
- Cabinets and cages for physical access control over tenants' equipment. Depending on one's needs a cabinet can house individual or multiple racks.
- Overhead or underfloor cable rack (tray) and fibreguide, power cables usually on separate rack from data
- Air conditioning is used to control the temperature and humidity in the space. ASHRAE recommends a temperature range and humidity range for optimal electronic equipment conditions versus environmental issues. The electrical power used by the electronic equipment is converted to heat, which is rejected to the ambient air in the data centre space. Unless the heat is removed, the ambient temperature will rise, resulting in electronic equipment malfunction. By controlling the space air temperature, the server components at the board level are kept within the manufacturer's specified temperature and humidity range. Air conditioning systems help keep equipment space humidity within acceptable parameters by cooling the return space air below the dew point. Too much humidity and water may begin to condense on internal components. In case of a dry atmosphere, ancillary humidification systems may add water vapour to the space if the humidity is too low, to avoid static electricity discharge problems which may damage components.
- Low-impedance electrical ground
- Few, if any, windows

Colocation data centres are often audited to prove that they attain certain standards and levels of reliability; the most commonly seen systems are SSAE 16 SOC 1 Type I and Type II (formerly SAS 70 Type I and Type II) and the tier system by the Uptime Institute or TIA. For service organisations today, SSAE 16 calls for a description of its "system". This is far more detailed and comprehensive than SAS 70's description of "controls". Other data centre compliance standards include Health Insurance Portability and Accountability Act (HIPAA) audit and PCI DSS Standards.

== Power ==
Colocation facilities generally have generators that start automatically when utility power fails, usually running on diesel fuel. These generators may have varying levels of redundancy, depending on how the facility is built. Generators do not start instantaneously, so colocation facilities usually have battery backup systems. In many facilities, the operator of the facility provides large inverters to provide AC power from the batteries. In other cases, customers may install smaller UPSes in their racks.

Some customers choose to use equipment that is powered directly by 48 VDC (nominal) battery banks. This may provide better energy efficiency, and may reduce the number of parts that can fail, though the reduced voltage greatly increases necessary current, and thus the size (and cost) of power delivery wiring. An alternative to batteries is a motor–generator connected to a flywheel and diesel engine.

Many colocation facilities can provide redundant, A and B power feeds to customer equipment, and high end servers and telecommunications equipment often can have two power supplies installed.

Colocation facilities are sometimes connected to multiple sections of the utility power grid for additional reliability.

== Internal connections ==
Colocation facility owners have differing rules regarding cross-connects between their customers, some of whom may be carriers. These rules may allow customers to run such connections at no charge, or allow customers to order such connections for a monthly fee. They may allow customers to order cross-connects to carriers, but not to other customers. Some colocation centres feature a "meet-me-room" where the different carriers housed in the centre can efficiently exchange data.

Most peering points sit in colocation centres and because of the high concentration of servers inside larger colocation centres, most carriers will be interested in bringing direct connections to such buildings. In many cases, there will be a larger Internet exchange point hosted inside a colocation centre, where customers can connect for peering.

== See also ==
- Carrier-neutral data center
