= NKIA =

Enterprise software vendor

NKIA Co., Ltd.
- Type: Private
- Industry: Enterprise Software
- Founded: February 1999
- Headquarters: Seongnam, South Korea
- Key people: Seon-Woo Lee (CEO)
- Revenue: > KRW 10 Billion (2011)
- Website: nkia.co.kr

NKIA is an enterprise software vendor based in Seongnam, South Korea and headed by CEO Seon-Woo Lee. The company develops various kinds of operations management systems and additionally provides consulting system management and training services. It is a leading provider of homegrown ITSM solutions to the South Korean market. It was founded in 1999, with subsidiaries later formed in Singapore and Malaysia and an office in Beijing.

== Revenue ==
The company's revenue exceeded 10 billion South Korean Won in 2011, about 10% of which was earned outside of South Korea.

== Clients ==
=== South Korean Government ===
NKIA is a major vendor of systems management solutions for domestic e-government projects. The South Korean Government's consistent ranking at the top of the United Nations' E-Government Readiness Index has been attributed in part to their use of NKIA software products. The National Computing and Information Agency's integrated operations management system was developed on the basis of three NKIA software products: Polestar ITSM, Polestar SMS, and Polestar XEUS.

Other public-sector clients in South Korea include the Ministry of Information and Communication, the Korea Deposit Insurance Corporation, the Ministry of Education & Human Resources Development, and the Ministry of Education, Science and Technology, who used NKIA software for the National Education Information System.

=== Other Clients ===
Other clients include Sun Microsystems, Asia Commercial Bank, LG Group, Malaysia Airports Technologies, KTX, Mobifone, Korea Telecom, and SK Telecom.

== Products ==
=== Monitoring ===
- Polestar SMS : This is systems management software. NKIA and Tibero signed an agreement in 2011 to certify interoperability between Polestar SMS and Tibero RDBMS and to work together to ensure intercompatibility of future products.
- Polestar VM SMS
- Polestar NMS
- Polestar STM
- Polestar DPM
- Polestar WPM
- Polestar APM
- Polestar SOC EMS

=== Operations Management ===
- Polestar ITSM
- Polestar ITAM: An IT asset management product
- Polestar Automation Suite
- Polestar XEUS: Provides a web-based cloud operations management solution to automate all IaaS (Infrastructure as a Service) administration tasks, including accounting, resource allocation, and real-time monitoring. It was released on September 7, 2011.
- Polestar TAMS

=== Governance ===
- Polestar Big Data Suite
- Polestar Enterprise Dashboard
