= Korea Internet Neutral Exchange =

Internet exchange point in South Korea

Korea Internet Neutral eXchange
- Full name: Korea Internet Neutral eXchange
- Abbreviation: KINX
- Founded: 2000
- Website: Official website

KINX(Korea Internet Neutral eXchange)
- Type: Public
- Traded as: KRX: 093320
- Industry: Internet
- Founded: June 17, 2000
- Headquarters: Seoul, South Korea
- Key people: Jee-Wook Kim (CEO)
- Revenue: USD 54 million (2019)
- Number of employees: 126 (2020)
- Parent: Gabia
- Subsidiaries: People Connect
- Website: kinx.net

Korea Internet Neutral Exchange (KINX Inc.; Korean: (주)케이아이엔엑스), the only carrier-neutral Internet exchange (IX) in South Korea, is a B2B company that specializes in Internet infrastructure. KINX provides Internet data center (IDC), content delivery network (CDN), and cloud computing services to customers. The headquarters is in Seoul, South Korea. As of March 2020, KINX has 126 employees.

== Services ==
=== IX (Internet exchange) ===
KINX operates a layer 2-based Internet exchange in South Korea. Its data center is carrier-neutral, which means that domestic and international Internet service providers (ISP), as well as content providers (CPs), are independent of any network providers and could freely select their peering partners. KINX is expanding its international coverage by establishing point of presence (PoP) in Hong Kong and Tokyo, Japan.

=== IDC (Internet data center) ===
KINX is currently operating four IDCs – all carrier-neutral – in and near the Seoul area. Its IX participants include Daum-Kakao, whose popular messenger service KakaoTalk boasts more than 140 million users.

=== CDN (Content delivery network) ===
KINX's CDN solution provides streaming, cache, and downloading services. Main customers of KINX’s solution are gaming companies, such as Com2uS and Neowiz Games, that deliver contents to end-users, and media outlets, such as the Korea Economic Daily and the Financial News, that provide real-time news updates to their audience.

=== Cloud (Cloud computing) ===
In 2012, KINX introduced 'IXcloud', becoming the first Korean company to provide public cloud service that utilizes OpenStack. It also provides support for both public and private companies' efforts to establish private cloud service. Since 2011, KINX, in partnership with AppCenter, has provided cloud service to mobile web developers for free-of-charge. In 2014, KINX signed the MOU with NEOPLY, a program managed by Neowiz Games to support startups and to provide infrastructure for cloud service.

=== CloudHub ===
KINX CloudHub is an advanced multi-cloud service platform that enables direct access to major international and domestic clouds including AWS, MS, Google, IBM, Tencent, Oracle, and Naver Business Platform. CloudHub service is a feature of ‘single port, many virtual circuits’, meaning that customers can save the costs of multiple circuits to each CSP. As KINX offers CloudHub service, customers now may choose hybrid cloud service with both colocation and multi-cloud service. Recently, the needs of multi-cloud and hybrid cloud services have been accelerating since diversity of the services is becoming more important.

== History ==
In the early days of the Internet in South Korea, domestic Internet traffic had to go via overseas Internet exchange Points. As the demand for the Internet rose dramatically, the government had to find a way to address the network’s low quality and rising costs; furthermore, they were particularly concerned with the rapid rise in volume of Internet traffic. With these issues in mind, NCA (National Computerization Agency) established the Korea Internet eXchange (KIX), the first IX in South Korea. Due to various circumstances, however, NCA privatized KIX. In December 1996, Korea Telecom (now KT Corporation) began operating Korea Telecom Internet eXchange (KTIX), and Dacom (now LG Uplus) founded Dacom Internet eXchange (DIX). Rather than solving problems, KTIX and DIX brought out other challenges such as the rising service charges IX customers had to pay. In 1998, to address these issues, 16 ISPs, excluding KT and Dacom, hosted the 'Korea Internet Interconnection Conference', which led to the establishment of Korea Internet Neutral eXchange (KINX) in June 2000.

=== 1990s ===
- Jul 1998: Held a meeting for ISPs to solve Internet interconnection problems (5 ISPs)
- Sep 1998: The 1st Korea Internet Interconnection Conference (Reached an agreement to establish an organization to address interconnection-related issues)
- Sep-Dec 1998: The 2nd, 3rd, 4th Korea Internet Interconnection Conference
- Jan 1999: The 5th, 6th, 7th Korea Internet Interconnection Conference (Recruitment of new IX members and Agreement on qualification standards)
- Jun 1999: Opening of the KINX Management Center

=== 2000s ===
- Feb 2000: The 10th Korea Internet Interconnection Conference (Resolution to establish KINX Inc.)
- Jun 2000: Establishment of KINX Inc.
- Jul 2000: KINX officially begins operations
- Sep 2000: Ceremony for the Foundation and Expansion of the KINX Interconnection Center
- Oct 2000: Registered as a value-added communication company (VACC)
- Apr 2001: Expansion of KINX Enterprise Affiliated Research Lab Foundation Approval (KITANET) & KINX Network Main Center
- Nov 2001: Registered as a Venture Enterprise as an Outstanding Technology Company (Small and Medium Business Administration)
- Feb 2002: Foundation of the Korea IX Association (KIXA)
- Nov 2002: Received an approval for the establishment of KINX Enterprise Affiliated Research Lab
- May 2003: Registered KINX Trademark to Patent Office
- Aug 2003: Kicked off KRNIC IRR Development Project (KINX Enterprise Affiliated Research Lab)
- Sep 2003: Interconnection with Yahoo.com IX
- Jul 2004: Interconnection with NCA (National Computerization Agency) (10 Gbit/s)
- Oct 2004: Received Appreciation Plaque and Education Human Resource General & EBS Scholastic Test Vice President Award (Hosted by the Ministry of Education & Human Resources Development)
- Jul 2005: Registered as Resale Telecommunication Business
- Oct 2005: Received Korea Expert Business Grand Prize in IX category (Sponsored by Hankook Ilbo)
- May 2006: Interconnection with NHN Corporation, leading portal site in South Korea
- Jul 2006: Selected as supervisor for the KISA (Korea Internet & Security Agency) eNum demonstration service business development
- Nov 2007: Received Certification of Technology Innovation Small and Medium Business (INNO-BIZ) (The Small and Medium Business Administration)
- Nov 2007: Selected as an outstanding technology company (Korea Technology Finance Corporation)
- Dec 2007: Received Special Award at the 6th Information Security Awards Ceremony
- Jan 2008: Provided interconnection service to National Computing and Information Agency in Daejeon 1 Center and Gwangju 2 Center
- Feb 2008: Signed MOU for kr name server management (NIDA-National Internet Development Agency of Korea)
- Mar 2009: Formed partnership with Britain's Xconnect Company to provide VoIP-IX service
- Jun 2009: Received Britain GTB Innovation Award

=== 2010s ===
- Jan 2010: Interconnection with Telkom Indonesia IX
- Apr 2010: Interconnection with Microsoft
- Feb 2011: Listed on KOSDAQ (Korean Securities Dealers Automated Quotations)
- Sep 2011: Acquired KGRID
- Apr 2012: Expansion and relocation of HQ to the Military Mutual Aid Association Building in Dogok-dong, Gangnam-gu, Seoul
- Aug 2012: Acquired Nowcom's CDN business unit
- Sep 2012: Launched KINX Cloud Service
- Feb 2013: Reached an agreement to provide co-location and MSP services to Cyber Hankuk University of Foreign Studies
- Apr 2013: Established Hong Kong PoP (Point of presence)
- Jun 2013: Interconnection with Akamai Technologies
- Jul 2013: Interconnection with Indosat
- Aug 2013: Reached an agreement to provide cloud service to Africa TV's 'Everybody's Band'
- Jan 2014: Interconnection with True International Gateway
- Mar 2014: Interconnection with Daum-Kakao
- Apr 2014: Acquired A2Company
- Apr 2014: Established U.S. PoP (Point of presence)
- Apr 2014: Reached an agreement to provide CDN service for Neowiz Games' mobile and web board games
- Jun 2014: Agreement to provide international IPv6 transit service to KISA (Korea Internet & Security Agency)
- Jul 2014: Designated as the official consulting organization for KISA (Korea Internet & Security Agency) IPv6 Consulting Project
- Aug 2014: Reached an agreement to provide CDN service to WOW TV
- Sep 2014: Selected as a company to manage KOCCA (Korea Creative Content Agency)'s project to operate game testing servers
- Oct 2014: Participated in KISA (Korea Internet & Security Agency) Public Private Partnership for IPv6 CDN Project
- Dec 2014: Awarded Certification on Best Family Friendly Management from Ministry of Gender Equality and Family
- Jan 2015: Selected as provider of KISA (Korea Internet & Security Agency) 'DDoS Cyber Urgent Shelter'
- Jun 2015: Launched K-CLEAN service (anti-DDoS attack system)
- Aug 2015: Expansion and relocation of HQ to the Gangnam Building in Secho-dong, Secho-gu, Seoul
- Aug 2015: Reached an agreement to provide CDN service to KERIS (Korea Education and Research Information Service)
- Aug 2015: Launched 'China Direct Connect' (Premium China bound traffic service)
- Nov 2015: Awarded 'SMB (Small and medium-sized enterprises) of ICT developmental merit' from Ministry of Science, ICT and Future Planning
- Nov 2015: Cloud service accredited by KACI (Korea Association of Cloud Industry)
- Dec 2015: Awarded the special prize for internet business from 10th ‘K-ICT Korea Internet Award’
- Dec 2015: Co-founded a laboratory company, Devstack
- Jan 2016: Provided 'AWS (Amazon Web Services) Direct Connect' location
- May 2016: Selected as a partner of Korea Creative Content Agency (KOCCA), supporting in research and development of cultural technology in 2016 (Culture content and movie, System development of cloud-based next generation render farm)
- Jun 2016: Agreement with NIA (National Information Society Agency) to provide cloud services for the public sector at CEART cloud store
- Nov 2016: Awarded by Minister in'2016 K-ICT Cloud Award' from Ministry of Science, ICT&Future Planning technology in 2016
- Feb 2017: Selected as a partner for the Microsoft 'ExpressRoute'
- Sep 2017: Relocation of HQ to the Gangnam Building in Secho-dong, Secho-gu, Seoul
- Oct 2017: Established Japan PoP (Point of presence)
- Feb 2018: Established partnership with RETN, a European ISP
- Mar 2018: Launched 'midibus' service (Contents/Video management solution)
- Apr 2018: Sunyoung Lee & Jeewook Kim appointed as Co-CEOs of KINX
- Jun 2018: Launched 'Korea~Japan Dedicated Circuit' service
- Aug 2018: Launched 'KDX (KINX Direct Connect)' service
- Oct 2018: Selected for 'NBP (Naver Business Platform) Cloud Connect' location provider
- Nov 2018: Awarded 'Best Companies to Work 2018' from Korea Chamber of Commerce and Industry
- Dec 2018: Launched 'IBM Direct Link' service
- Dec 2018: Awarded 'Youth-Friendly Small Giants 2019' from Ministry of Employment and Labor
- Jan 2019: Launched 'Tencent Direct Connect' service
- Aug 2019: Launched 'Oracle Fast Connect' service
- Dec 2019: Awarded ‘2019 Excellent Corporate Workplace Environment Award' from Seoul Business Agency

=== 2020s ===
- Jan 2020: Awarded ‘2019 Excellent Corporate Workplace Environment among Software Companies' from Korea Software Industry Association
- Mar 2020: Jeewook Kim appointed as sole CEO of KINX
- May 2020: Selected as a partner of National IT Industry Promotion Agency (NIPA), supplying cloud services for SMEs in 2020
- Jun 2020: Launched 'Google Cloud Interconnect' service

== See also ==
- List of Internet exchange points
