= National Information Systems =

National Information systems may refer to:

- National Historical Geographic Information System
- National Library and Information System
- National Integrated Drought Information System
- National Education Information System
- National Association for Public Health Statistics and Information Systems
- National Information Systems, Inc. (founded 1972), vendor of Accent R
