= E-Government in South Korea =

Use of information technology by government

E-Government in South Korea progressed notably with the establishment of the National Computerization Agency (NCA) in 1986, and was further developed under President Kim Dae-jung's administration with the creation of the Presidential Special Committee for e-Government (SCeG) in 2001. The passage of the Electronic Government Act of 2001 provided the essential legal framework, facilitating the advancement of e-government initiatives.

South Korea's progress in digital government services is evidenced by its performance in the United Nations' E-Government Development Index (EGDI). Starting at 13th out of 191 countries in 2003, the country moved to 5th by 2004 and reached 1st place in 2010 among 192 countries. From 2010 to 2022, South Korea consistently held a top 3 position in the UN e-government survey.

In the 2019 Organisation for Economic Co-operation and Development (OECD) Digital Government Index, South Korea ranked first among the OECD countries. The country allocated 33.9% of its Gross Domestic Product (GDP) to public expenditures in 2019, lower than the OECD average of 46.6%. Social protection expenditures comprised 6.9% of GDP, less than the OECD average of 13.3%. Progress toward gender parity within public administration and politics has been gradual. In 2020, South Korea had the second lowest share of women in senior management in central government positions among OECD countries, with a slight increase from 6% in 2015 to 9% in 2020. Women held 16% of the seats in the unicameral parliament in 2012, increasing to 19% in 2021, compared to the OECD average of 32%. Meanwhile, the percentage of cabinet posts held by women rose from 11% in 2012 to 28% in 2021.

== Defining e-Government ==
The term "Electronic Government" first appeared in official documents in September 1993, on page 112 of a report for government reform by the Clinton administration ("Creating A Government that Works Better and Costs Less: From Red Tape to Results"). The United Nations has defined the concept "e-government", or "Digital Government", as "The employment of the Internet and the world-wide-web for delivering government information and services to the citizens". (United Nations, 2006; AOEMA, 2005). E-Government involves "[t]he utilization of IT, ICTs, and other web-based telecommunication technologies services to improve and/or enhance on the efficiency and effectiveness of service delivery in the public sector." (Jeong, 2007).

Initiated in the 1990s, Korea's e-Government strategy aimed to meet increasing demands for online public services and transparency. Engaging with the OECD Working Party of Senior Digital Government Officials, Korea aligned its digital governance with international standards. Through OECD guidance, Korea enhanced its strategies focusing on digital identity, a data-driven public sector, and user-centric service design.

== Digital Government Master Plan 2021–2025 ==
In June 2021, the South Korean government announced its digital government strategy for 2021–2025, highlighting the implementation of intelligent service design and delivery, the promotion of data-driven public administration, and the construction of an inclusive digital infrastructure. South Korea's Digital Government Master Plan 2021–2025 is structured around three primary objectives:

- Implementing Intelligent Public Services: This mission includes creating natural language-based virtual assistant platforms, implementing fully-digitized information exchange with MyData and digital certificates, introducing secure and convenient authentication technologies such as blockchain and the Internet of Things (IoT), and offering proactive service notifications and a one-stop application process.
- Facilitating Data-Based Government: It involves establishing government data analysis centers, conducting data analysis projects for informed policy making, applying data for disaster prevention and response, and opening public data and Application Programming Interfaces (APIs) for private sector collaboration. Emphasis is also placed on utilizing cloud computing technology to enhance the cost-effectiveness, availability, and robustness of government information systems.
- Strengthening the Foundation of Digital Transformation: This focuses on designing online services to include vulnerable groups, fostering public-private partnerships, updating the legal framework to cover digital rights and ethics, and promoting international cooperation.

== History ==
=== The beginning (1960s–1970s) ===
South Korea's E-Government project first started as part of the office automation efforts for statistical analysis work in the Economic Planning Board (EPB) and the Ministry of Trade and Industry (MTI) which are established by Park Chung Hee's government (Influenced by Japan's governance, Ministry of International Trade and Industry (MITI) and the Keiretsu system to be precise) with the introduction of computers in 1967. At the time, it was the Committee on Coordination for Development of Computerized Organization established in 1967 under the Ministry of Science and Technology (South Korea) (MoST) that supplied computers to each ministry in the government.

In a survey conducted a decade later on supply and management of computers in government agencies by MoST in 1977, it was found that computers had greatly contributed to fast and accurate results in simple arithmetic tasks such as payroll and personnel management, calculations for phone bills, grading tests and so on, in central agencies such as the Ministry of Culture and Education, then Ministry of Communication and Postal Service (now Ministry of Information and Communication (South Korea) and Korea Post), and the National Tax Agency. However, in 1978, the need for digitization rather than simple automation of menial tasks brought about the start of the E-Government initiative aiming to realize a more advanced model of E-Government.

Moves to introduce ICT into government took the form of E-Government projects for building the necessary infrastructure to achieve this end, under the "Five Year Basic Plan on Informatization of Public Administration". These efforts, led by the Ministry of Government Administration and Home Affairs (MOGAHA), paved the way for the implementation of South Korea's advanced digitization policies in the 1980s.

=== Building the infrastructure for E-government (1980s–1990s) ===
The decision to build a "National Backbone Computer Network" and subsequent enactments of laws such as the Computer Program Protection Act Supply and Utilization of Computer Network Act in 1986, and the Software Development Promotion Act in 1987, secured technology and infrastructure vital to realizing e-governance. These efforts led to a concrete plan and project engagements for the "National Backbone Computer Network" project that would become the communications and information network for the public sector. Under this plan, five national network projects – administration, finance, education and research, defense, and security – were launched.

This period was also a turning point for the infrastructure of e-governance in South Korea. In 1993, a basic plan for building the foundation for the Information Super-Highway was announced, and the Ministry of Information and Communication (MIC) was launched in 1994. The following year saw the enactment by the National Assembly of the "Framework on Informatization Promotion Act", which became the basis for policies on informatization and e-governance. Based on this Act, the "Informatization Promotion Committee" was created along with the "Informatization Promotion Fund," to act as the steering head for informatization and E-Government initiatives. This act also provided a firm basis for implementing E-Government initiatives such as the chief information officer (CIO) system. During the latter half of the 1990s, the first Informatization Promotion conference was held at the Blue House on October 14, 1996, where President Kim Young-sam's ideas on E-Government were announced in the form of a report, "Informatization Strategy for Strengthening National Competitiveness". In 1997, an evaluation system for informatization projects was introduced while plans were made for the implementation of the second stage of advanced ICT.

=== Full-scale implementation of E-Government (2000–2020) ===
With the inauguration of the Kim Dae-jung administration in 1998, the official government homepage went online and Internet-based civil services, such as real estate registration, became available. Presidential executive orders for appointing CIOs in the public sector and guidelines for sharing administrative information were established as well. In 1999 a comprehensive E-Government implementation plan was created, while civil services based on integrated civil application information systems and comprehensive statistical information systems were introduced.

By 2001, halfway into the term of the Kim Dae-Jung administration, South Korea passed the first comprehensive legislation on E-Government, the "Promotion of Digitalization of Administrative Work for E-Government Realization Act". The SCEG began work in February of the same year, holding 12 executive and two general meetings where detailed plans for implementation, as well as funding for the 11 newly selected key E-Government projects, listed in (Table 1), were drawn up and reported to the President on 7 May 2001.

With the inauguration of Participatory Government under President Roh Moo-hyun in 2002, policies for E-Government became focused on ways to extend informatization. The former PCGI was restructured into PCGID (Presidential Committee on Government Innovation and Decentralization), encompassing E-Government, administrative reform, fiscal and tax reform, and decentralization. From each of the sub-committees in charge of these areas, implementation plans centered on the presidential agenda were announced as Roadmap tasks.

For e-governance, the "Participatory Government's Vision and Direction of E-Government" was announced in May 2003, and the "E-Government Roadmap" based on the vision of realizing the "World's Best Open E-Government" was released in August of the same year. The roadmap is divided into four areas, 10 agenda, 31 tasks, and managed in terms of 45 detailed sub tasks. It sets specific targets, including: increasing online public services to 85%; attaining a top 10 ranking in the world for business support competitiveness; reducing visits for civil service applicants to 3 per year; and raising the utilization rate of E-Government programs to 60%.

== See also ==
- Government of South Korea
