= Kyoungchul Kong =

South Korean mechanical engineer

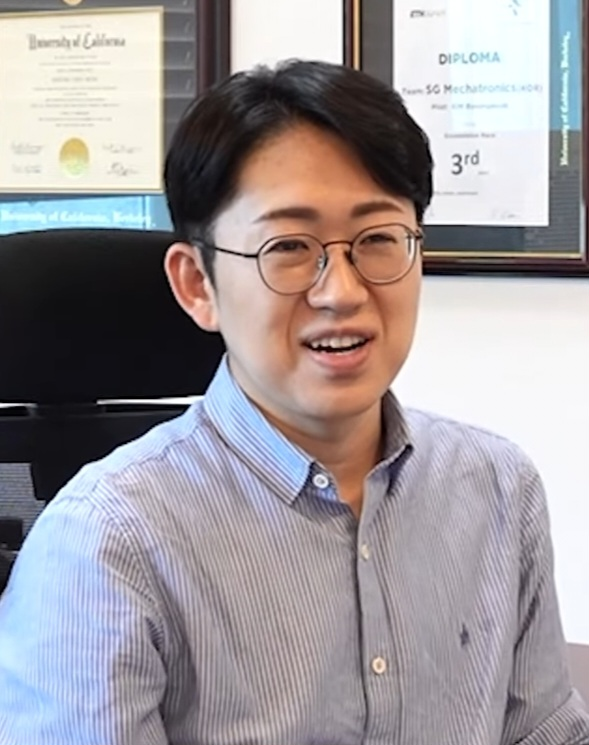
- Occupations: Mechanical engineer, entrepreneur, academic and author
- Awards: Bronze Medal, Cybathlon (2016); Prime Minister's Award, Prime Minister of Korea (2019); Gold Medal, Cybathlon (2020)

Academic background
- Education: Sogang University; University of California, Berkeley
- Thesis: [ProQuest 507127123 OCLC 680687587 Mechatronic Considerations for Human Assistive and Rehabilitation Systems] (2009)

Academic work
- Institutions: Korea Advanced Institute of Science and Technology (KAIST); Angel Robotics

Kyoungchul Kong is a South Korean mechanical engineer, entrepreneur, academic, and author. He was selected as one of the Leader Scientists from the National Research Foundation of Korea in 2023. He is an associate professor at the Korea Advanced Institute of Science and Technology (KAIST) and is the chief executive officer (CEO) of Angel Robotics.

Kong's research focuses on robust control systems, human assistive robotics, and the design and control of legged robots. He is the author of the book Intelligent Assistive Robots: Recent Advances in Assistive Robotics for Everyday Activities. Under his leadership, Angel Robotics has developed products, including the WalkON Suit for individuals with complete lower body paralysis, the Angel Suit for those with partial paralysis or weakened muscles, and the Angel Legs M, a robotic rehabilitation device used in hospitals. He won a bronze medal at the inaugural Cybathlon in 2016 and received both gold and bronze medals in the 2020 Cybathlon for his wearable robotic devices. Additionally, he received commendation awards from the Prime Minister of South Korea, including the Prime Minister's Award in 2019 for his contributions to the 2018 PyeongChang Winter Olympics.

== Education ==
Kong completed his BEng in mechanical engineering and B.S. in physics, both from Sogang University in 2004. He earned his M.S. in mechanical engineering at Sogang University in 2006, with a thesis titled "Design and Control of Exoskeletal Robots for Patients and Elderly People," under the supervision of Doyoung Jeon. During his master's studies, he developed a wearable robot named EXPOS. In 2009, he received his PhD in mechanical engineering from the University of California, Berkeley, with his dissertation "Mechatronic Considerations for Human Assistive and Rehabilitation Systems," advised by Masayoshi Tomizuka. His force-mode actuation and human intention recognition research received the best student paper award of the IEEE/ASME International Conference on Advanced Intelligence Mechatronics 2008.

== Career ==
Kong began his career as a postdoctoral research fellow at the University of California, Berkeley, from 2009 to 2011. He then joined Sogang University as an assistant professor, from 2011 to 2014, and later was appointed as an associate professor, a position he held from 2015 to 2018. In 2017, he founded Angel Robotics company, and is its CEO. Since 2019, he has been concurrently holding the position of associate professor at KAIST.

== Research ==
Kong's research primarily focuses on robust control systems, human assistive robotics, and the design and control of legged robots, for which he holds several patents. His work in wearable robotics has encompassed applications, including gait training for individuals with severe disabilities, treatments for patients with muscle weakness, gait assistance for those with paraplegia, and support for daily walking. He has also developed wearable robot technologies aimed at enhancing workers' capabilities.

Kong's work has received media coverage and has been featured by numerous media outlets, including Physics Magazine, IEEE Spectrum, Phys.org, irobotnews, engineering.com, and ScienceAlert.

=== Human assistive robots ===
Kong has made contributions to the field of human assistive robotics through his research and development efforts. Together with his laboratory and company, his research has covered fundamentals and commercialization of wearable robots. Angel Legs M20, one his research outcomes, has been commercialized.

Kong also proposed the design and robust control of a compact rotary series elastic actuator (cRSEA) for human assistive robots, addressing challenges such as torque amplification and friction, and validated the performance through experiments. He developed a tendon-driven exoskeletal device (EXPOS), a wearable robot designed to assist elderly individuals and patients with mobility issues by minimizing the weight and volume of wearable components by using a caster walker to carry heavy items.

Kong's research on human assistive robots included designing a high-speed robotic leg that optimized tangential mobility and radial force producibility through specific actuator configurations and limb length ratios. This design was demonstrated through experimental running motions. Additionally, he introduced a new fuzzy logic-based method for continuous and smooth detection of human gait phases using ground contact force sensors in smart shoes, along with an algorithm to monitor and quantify gait abnormalities for advanced rehabilitation systems.

In his book, Intelligent Assistive Robots: Recent Advances in Assistive Robotics for Everyday Activities, Kong focused on the challenges and applications of assistive robots in healthcare and wellness. The book explored topics such as elderly care, support for dependent persons, and smart environments, addressing issues in control theory, design, mechatronics, and security. He also examined the improvement of force control performance of Series Elastic Actuators (SEAs) using dynamic models and model-based control algorithms to achieve high-precision force control, robust stability, and performance despite the limitations imposed by elasticity. Furthermore, he delved into the design and control algorithms of a rotary series elastic actuator (RSEA) for precise torque generation in human-robot interactions, employing a torsional spring and disturbance observer method to compensate for motor friction and inertia.

== Awards and honors ==
- 2016 – Bronze Medal, Cybathlon
- 2019 – Prime Minister's Award, Prime Minister of Korea
- 2020 – Bronze Medal, Cybathlon
- 2020 – Gold Medal, Cybathlon
- 2021 – "Breakthroughs" Reader's Choice Award, KAIST
- 2021 – Outstanding Paper Award, The 16th Korea Robotics Society Annual Conference
- 2021 – Best Paper Scientist, The Korean Federation of Science & Technology Societies and The Ministry of Science and ICT
- 2021 – Commendation by Minister, Ministry of Trade, Industry and Energy, Korea
- 2021 – Commendation by Minister, Ministry of Health and Welfare, Korea
- 2022 – Commendation by Minister, Ministry of Science and ICT, Korea

== Bibliography ==
=== Books ===
- Intelligent Assistive Robots: Recent Advances in Assistive Robotics for Everyday Activities (2015) ISBN 978-3319129211

=== Selected articles ===
- Kong, K., & Jeon, D. (2006). Design and control of an exoskeleton for the elderly and patients. IEEE/ASME Transactions on mechatronics, 11(4), 428–432.
- Kong, K., Bae, J., & Tomizuka, M. (2009). Control of rotary series elastic actuator for ideal force-mode actuation in human–robot interaction applications. IEEE/ASME transactions on mechatronics, 14(1), 105–118.
- Kong, K., & Tomizuka, M. (2009). A gait monitoring system based on air pressure sensors embedded in a shoe. IEEE/ASME Transactions on mechatronics, 14(3), 358–370.
- Kong, K., Bae, J., & Tomizuka, M. (2011). A compact rotary series elastic actuator for human assistive systems. IEEE/ASME transactions on mechatronics, 17(2), 288–297.
- Oh, S., & Kong, K. (2016). High-precision robust force control of a series elastic actuator. IEEE/ASME Transactions on mechatronics, 22(1), 71–80.
