= Communications in Korea =

Communications in Korea may refer to:

- Communications in North Korea
- Communications in South Korea
