= Xeus =

Xeus or XEUS may refer to:

- XEUS, a space observatory plan developed by the European Space Agency
- Polestar Xeus, a solution from the South Korean software vendor NKIA for monitoring cloud systems
- Xeus, a vertical-landing, vertical-takeoff lunar lander demonstrator from Masten Space Systems
