= Dimitris Lagoudas =

Dimitris C. Lagoudas
- Born: Greece
- Occupations: Mechanical engineer, academic, and author

Academic background
- Education: Aristotle University of Thessaloniki; Lehigh University; Cornell University; Max Planck Institute

Academic work
- Institutions: Texas A&M University

Dimitris C. Lagoudas is a Greek American mechanical engineer, academic, and author. He is a professor of aerospace engineering and materials science and engineering as well as a University Distinguished Professor at Texas A&M University.

Lagoudas is most known for his works on the characterization, modeling, and design of multifunctional material systems and composites, using methods that connect different length scales and functionalities to create "smart structures". Among his authored works are his publications in academic journals, including International Journal of Plasticity and Composites Science and Technology as well as books such as Shape Memory Alloys: Modeling and Engineering Applications and Active Origami: Modeling, Design, and Applications. Moreover, he is the recipient of the 2011 Smart Structures and Materials Lifetime Achievement Award from SPIE.

== Education ==
Lagoudas obtained a Diploma in Mechanical Engineering from the Aristotle University of Thessaloniki. In 1986, he completed his PhD in Applied Mathematics at Lehigh University, followed by post-doctoral studies at Cornell University and the Max Planck Institute.

== Career ==
Lagoudas began his academic career in 1988 at Rensselaer Polytechnic Institute, where he served as an assistant professor of civil and environmental engineering from 1988 to 1992. He then served as an adjunct associate professor in the same department from 1992 to 1993. In 1992, he joined Texas A&M University as an associate professor of aerospace engineering, a position he held until 1998. Moreover, since 1998, he has been a professor of aerospace engineering at Texas A&M University and has held the title of University Distinguished Professor since 2013 and a joint appointment with the department of materials science and engineering.

== Publications ==
Lagoudas has contributed to books throughout his career. In 1988, he co-authored the book Gauge Theory and Defects in Solids. The book explored the dynamics of defects and damage in solids through a detailed development of gauge theory, focusing on dislocation densities and currents arising from loading conditions, with an emphasis on fundamental mechanics and physics essential for engineering applications. In his 2008 publication Shape Memory Alloys: Modeling and Engineering Applications he provided a comprehensive exploration of continuum mechanics and thermodynamics as they applied to modeling the behavior of shape memory alloys (SMAs). The book extended to include magnetic SMAs and offered an approach to constitutive modeling. More recently in 2018, he co-authored the book Active Origami: Modeling, Design, and Applications, wherein he explored advanced origami techniques incorporating active materials, covering kinematics, design, and structural mechanics with both conventional creased folds and active smooth folds.

== Research ==
Lagoudas' interdisciplinary research spans various fields, with a focus on shape memory alloys, adaptive aerospace structures, and multifunctional nano-composites.

=== Shape memory alloys ===
Lagoudas' research on Shape Memory Alloys (SMAs) has advanced the field of active or smart materials through the development of rigorous thermomechanical models based on internal state variables. Notably, his work has extended to magnetic SMAs, shape memory polymers, and high-temperature phase-transforming materials. Furthermore, he also led pioneering multi disciplinary university initiative programs funded by the Army research office and the US Air Force office of scientific research, addressing complex problems in SMA applications for adaptive structures and extreme environments.

=== Adaptive aerospace structures ===
Lagoudas' research team has significantly advanced adaptive morphing aerospace structures using active materials, particularly shape memory alloy (SMA) actuators. Their work includes the integration of SMA actuators into morphing wings, aerodynamic surfaces, and helicopter blades. His team also developed control approaches for the thermomechanical hysteretic response of phase-transforming actuators, enabling precise shape and vibration control. Additionally, they also explored origami-based deployable morphing structures. More notably, his team demonstrated SMA actuators in morphing aircraft, with projects supported by the Department of Defense, Northrop Grumman, Boeing, and NASA.

=== Multifunctional nano-composites ===
Lagoudas and his research team have pioneered micromechanics methods, initially focused on inelastic metal matrix composites and subsequently expanding to active, multifunctional, and nanocomposites. Their computational implementation of the Eshelby solution for fully anisotropic media has enabled the application of micromechanics to diverse materials, including phase-transforming composites. Furthermore, their advancements in carbon nanotube synthesis and processing have facilitated the development of multifunctional carbon nanotube-reinforced composites, particularly in aerospace applications.

== Awards and honors ==
- 2000 – Fellow, American Society of Mechanical Engineers
- 2009 – Fellow, Society of Engineering Science
- 2011 – Presidential Award of Excellence for Faculty Service to International Students, TAMU
- 2011 – Smart Structures and Materials Lifetime Achievement Award, SPIE
- 2014 – Fellow, American Institute of Aeronautics and Astronautics

== Bibliography ==
=== Books ===
- Gauge Theory and Defects in Solids (1988) ISBN 9780444600103
- Shape Memory Alloys: Modeling and Engineering Applications (2008) ISBN 9780387476841
- Active Origami: Modeling, Design, and Applications (2018) ISBN 9783319918655

=== Selected articles ===
- Lagoudas, D. C., Bo, Z., & Qidwai, M. A. (1996). A unified thermodynamic constitutive model for SMA and finite element analysis of active metal matrix composites. Mechanics of composite materials and structures, 3(2), 153–179.
- Boyd, J. G., & Lagoudas, D. C. (1996). A thermodynamical constitutive model for shape memory materials. Part I. The monolithic shape memory alloy. International journal of plasticity, 12(6), 805–842.
- Qidwai, M. A., & Lagoudas, D. C. (2000). Numerical implementation of a shape memory alloy thermomechanical constitutive model using return mapping algorithms. International Journal for Numerical Methods in Engineering, 47(6), 1123–1168.
- Seidel, G. D., & Lagoudas, D. C. (2006). Micromechanical analysis of the effective elastic properties of carbon nanotube reinforced composites. Mechanics of materials, 38(8–10), 884–907.
- Patoor, E., Lagoudas, D. C., Entchev, P. B., Brinson, L. C., & Gao, X. (2006). Shape memory alloys, Part I: General properties and modeling of single crystals. Mechanics of materials, 38(5–6), 391–429.
- Hartl, D. J., & Lagoudas, D. C. (2007). Aerospace applications of shape memory alloys. Proceedings of the Institution of Mechanical Engineers, Part G: Journal of Aerospace Engineering, 221(4), 535–552.
- Lagoudas, D., Hartl, D., Chemisky, Y., Machado, L., & Popov, P. (2012). Constitutive model for the numerical analysis of phase transformation in polycrystalline shape memory alloys. International Journal of Plasticity, 32, 155–183.
- Peraza-Hernandez, E. A., Hartl, D. J., Malak Jr, R. J., & Lagoudas, D. C. (2014). Origami-inspired active structures: a synthesis and review. Smart Materials and Structures, 23(9), 094001.
