= Information and Communications University =

Korean information technology university

- 한국정보통신대학교
- Active: 1998; 28 years ago – 2009; 17 years ago
- Location: Yuseong-gu, Daejeon, Korea; 36.392°N 127.399°E
- Campus: Urban
- Website: www.icu.ac.kr

- Information and Communications University
- Hangul: 한국정보통신대학교
- Hanja: 韓國情報通信大學校
- RR: Hanguk jeongbo tongsin daehakgyo
- MR: Han'guk chŏngbo t'ongsin taehakkyo

Information and Communications University (ICU), established in 1998, was a Korean university focused primarily on research and engineering in the field of information technology. It was located in the city of Daejeon and comprised an engineering school and a management school. As of 2006, about 20% of the enrolled graduate students were international students. Unlike other Korean universities, almost all courses were taught in English.

On March 1, 2009, the university merged into KAIST as a separate department, under the name of the Information Technology Convergence Campus. After this controversial merger a consortium of Professors and Directors of Research Centres (at ICU) in South Korea founded The Information and Communications University (ICU) to perpetuate the legacy and continuity of the Information and Communications University through international training and distance education, with its subsidiary in Zambia (ICU Zambia).

== Schools ==
The university consists of an engineering school and a business school. Both are focused on information technology. The engineering school is focused on research in computer science and communications technology and has a total of 764 students. The business school is focused on the managerial and financial aspects of the IT industry and has a total of 162 students.

== Academics ==
Undergraduate students are offered B.S. degrees in computer science and engineering or electrical and computer engineering by the engineering school and B.S. degrees in IT-Business by the business school. Graduate students enroll in M.S. or Ph.D. programs in specialized tracks in engineering or IT-business. It is also possible to enroll in a combined M.S./Ph.D. program. The engineering school also offers a master of software engineering (MSE) program, which is run jointly with Carnegie Mellon University.

Courses are taught in spring, summer, and fall terms. Almost all of the courses are taught in English. In preparation, undergraduate students receive instruction in the language even before entering the university, and must take additional courses in English up to their second year of studies. Both undergraduate and graduate students are also required to take a number of courses outside of their discipline, so that a student in the engineering school must take courses offered by the business school and vice versa.

== Campus ==
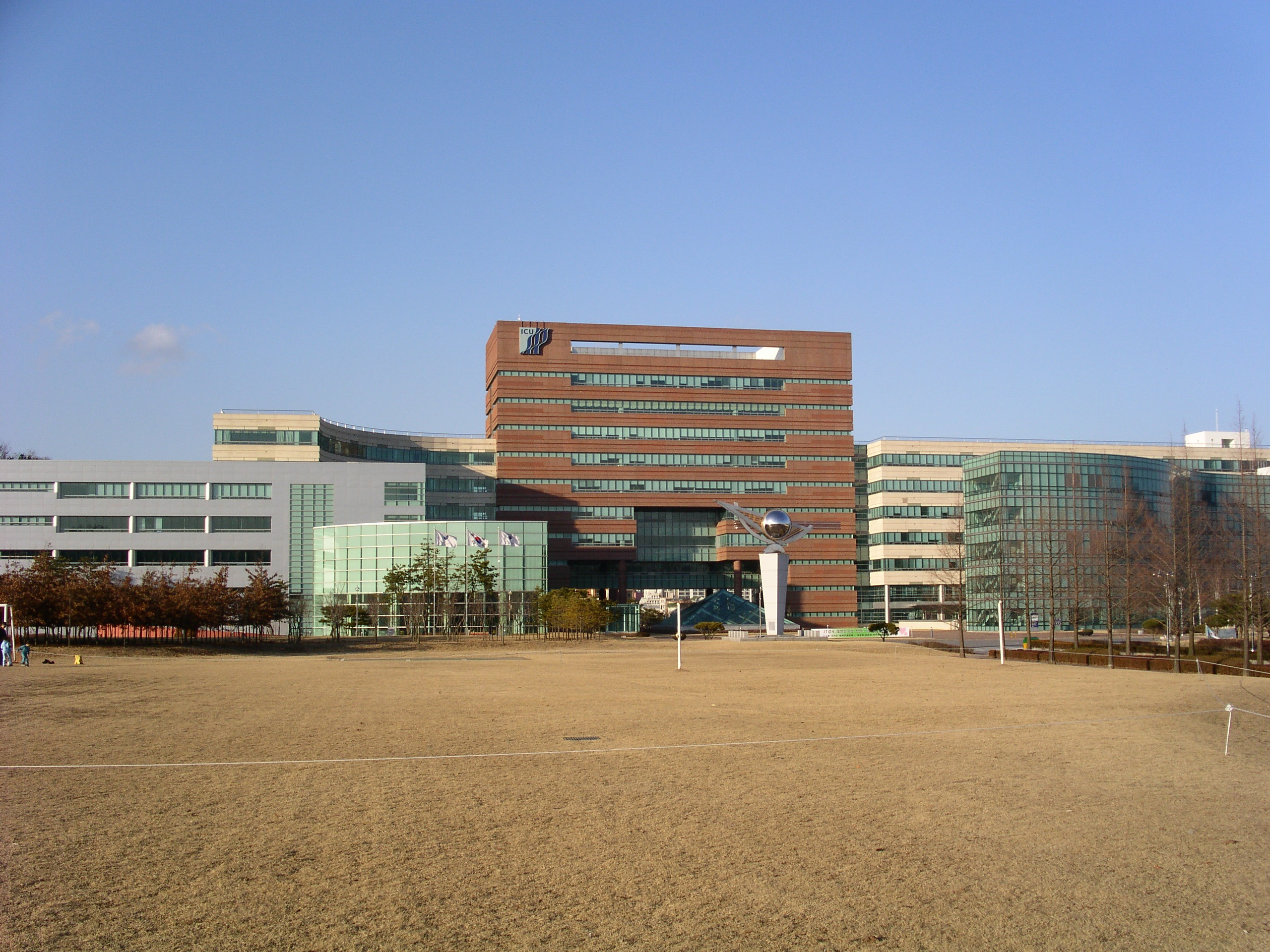
Main campus

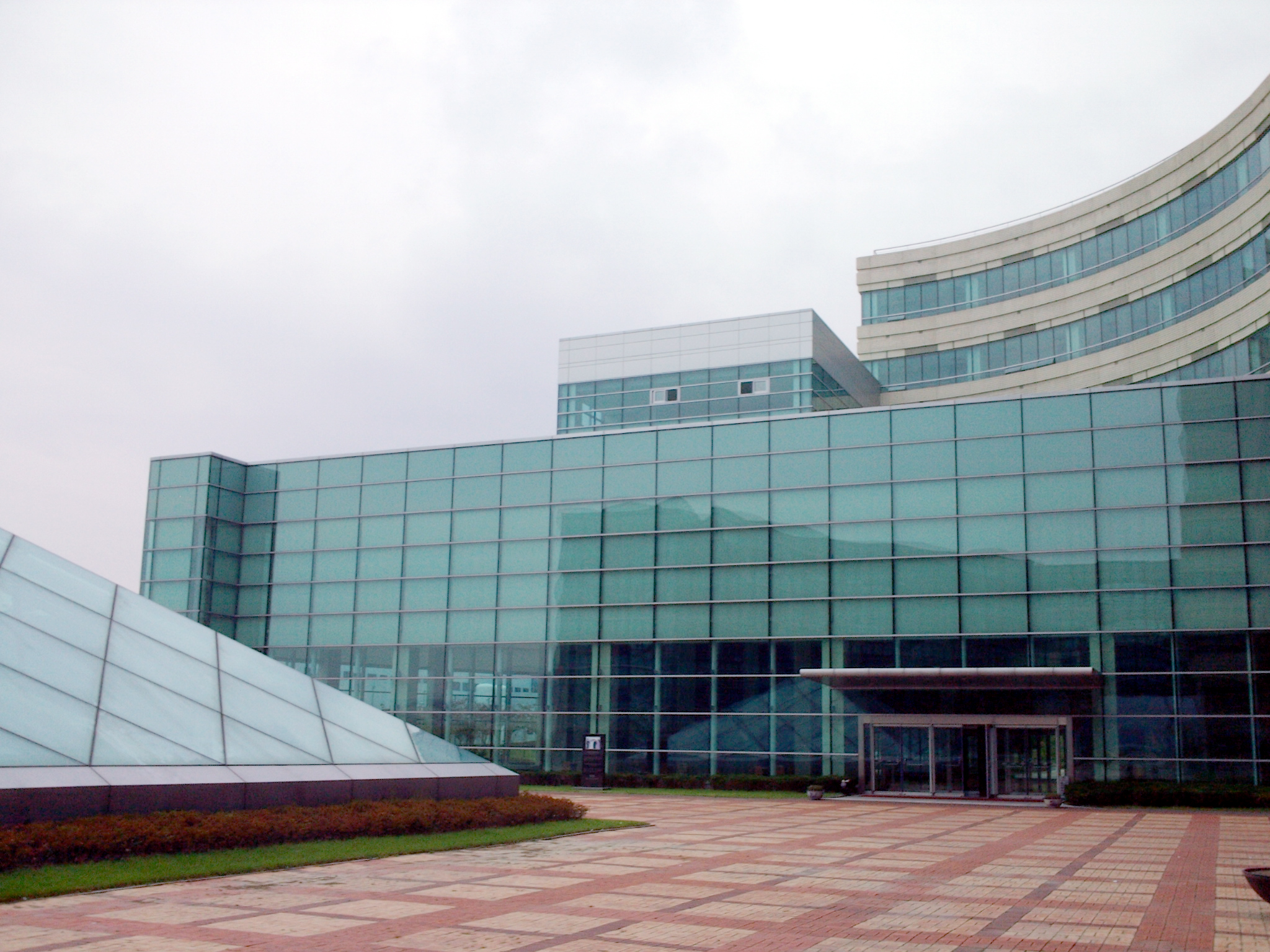
Lecture wing

The main campus is located in Daedeok Science Town at the city of Daejeon. Most lecture, administrative, and faculty facilities are located in adjoined buildings. Research facilities are dispersed throughout several disjoint buildings. Other facilities on the campus include a cafeteria, a dormitory, and a playing field.

A branch campus which houses the Digital Media Lab and the Software Technology Institute is located in Gangnam-gu, Seoul. A Lithuanian branch campus is planned to open in September 2007, which will be the first foreign branch campus opened by a Korean university.

== Research ==
A heavy emphasis is placed on research. In 2005, the university had the most patents submitted per faculty member among Korean universities and was selected for the seventh Auto-ID Lab.

The university operates several research centers:

- The ICU-Samsung Joint Research Center in collaboration with Samsung
- 4 IT research centers sponsored by the Ministry of Information and Communication
- 2 engineering research centers sponsored by the Ministry of Science and Technology

== History ==
- 1996 – Establishment proposed by the Ministry of Information and Communication.
- 1998 – Establishment of graduate school with 114 students
- 1999 – Opening of the Hwa-am campus
- 2002 – Establishment of undergraduate school with 105 students
- 2004 – Moved to the Munji campus
- 2007 – Ordered to merge with KAIST by government.
- 2008 – KAIST officially agrees with merger.
- 2009 – Merged into KAIST

== See also ==
- List of universities in Zambia
- Education in Zambia
