= KOCW =

KOCW may refer to:

- KOCW (TV), a television station (channel 14) licensed to Hoisington, Kansas, United States
- the ICAO code for Youngstown–Warren Regional Airport in Vienna, Ohio, United States
- Korea OpenCourseWare (KOCW), a service of Korea Education & Research Information Service
