= Jeong Whan Yoon =

South Korean mechanical engineer

- Occupations: Mechanical engineer and academic

Academic background
- Education: B.S., Precision Mechanical Engineering; M.S., Precision Engineering and Mechatronics; Ph.D., Mechanical Engineering
- Alma mater: Hanyang University; Korea Advanced Institute of Science and Technology (KAIST)

Jeong Whan Yoon (Korean: 윤정환) is a mechanical engineer and academic. He is a professor of Mechanical Engineering at the Korea Advanced Institute of Science and Technology (KAIST) and a research professor of Applied Mechanics at Deakin University.

Yoon's research explores material mechanics, advanced manufacturing, and computational modeling. He is a recipient of the 2023 Khan International Award and Medal from the International Journal of Plasticity. He is also a fellow of the Korean Academy of Science and Technology.

== Education ==
Yoon received his Bachelor's in Precision Mechanical Engineering from Hanyang University in 1991. Following this, he joined KAIST, completing his Master's in Precision Engineering and Mechatronics in 1993, and his Ph.D. in Mechanical Engineering in 1997.

== Career ==
Yoon was a senior research engineer at the LG Production Engineering Research Center from 1998 to 2001. Following this, he was a senior developer at MSC Software Corporation until 2003. Between 2003 and 2010, he was a senior staff scientist at Alcoa Technical Center. In 2010, he joined Swinburne University of Technology as a professor of Advanced Manufacturing and research director, and remained in those roles until 2013. From 2013 to 2015, he was a chair professor of Applied Mechanics and head of manufacturing at Deakin University. Since 2015, he has been a professor of Mechanical Engineering at KAIST and a research professor of Applied Mechanics at Deakin University.

== Research ==
Yoon's research has focused on the mechanics of materials, computational modeling, and advanced manufacturing processes. His work explores plasticity, computational mechanics, and optimization of sheet metal components, with particular emphasis on understanding and predicting material behavior under complex loading conditions. His works have focused on enhancing performance in applications such as metal forming. A significant area of his research involves constitutive modeling and simulation of material deformation, including anisotropic hardening and yield criteria. He has also contributed to the development of analytical yield formulations that describe anisotropic plastic behavior under complex (multiaxial) stress states, often incorporating advanced computational techniques.

== Awards and honors ==
- 2022 – Fellow, The Korean Academy of Science and Technology
- 2023 – Khan International Award and Medal, International Journal of Plasticity

== Selected articles ==
- Yoon, Jeong Whan; Yang, D.Y.; Chung, K. (1999). "Elasto-plastic finite element method based on incremental deformation theory and continuum based shell elements for planar anisotropic sheet materials". Computer Methods in Applied Mechanics and Engineering. 174 (1–2): 23–56. doi:10.1016/S0045-7825(98)00275-8.
- Yoon, Jeong Whan; Barlat, F.; Chung, K.; Pourboghrat, F.; Yang, D.Y. (2000). "Earing predictions based on asymmetric nonquadratic yield function". International Journal of Plasticity. 16 (9): 1075–1104. doi:10.1016/S0749-6419(99)00086-8.
- Barlat, F.; Brem, J.C.; Yoon, Jeong Whan; Chung, K.; Dick, R.E.; Lege, D.J.; Pourboghrat, F.; Choi, S.-H. (2003). "Plane stress yield function for aluminum alloy sheets—part 1: theory". International Journal of Plasticity. 19 (9): 1297–1319. doi:10.1016/S0749-6419(02)00019-0.
- Yoon, Jeong Whan; Barlat, Frédéric; Dick, Robert E.; Chung, Kwansoo; Kang, Tae Jin (2004). "Plane stress yield function for aluminum alloy sheets—part II: FE formulation and its implementation". International Journal of Plasticity. 20 (3): 495–522. doi:10.1016/S0749-6419(03)00099-8.
- Stoughton, Thomas B.; Yoon, Jeong Whan (2004). "A pressure-sensitive yield criterion under a non-associated flow rule for sheet metal forming". International Journal of Plasticity. 20 (4–5): 705–731. doi:10.1016/S0749-6419(03)00079-2.
- Barlat, F.; Aretz, H.; Yoon, Jeong Whan; Karabin, M.E.; Brem, J.C.; Dick, R.E. (2005). "Linear transfomation-based anisotropic yield functions". International Journal of Plasticity. 21 (5): 1009–1039. doi:10.1016/j.ijplas.2004.06.004.
- Yoon, Jeong Whan; Barlat, F; Dick, R; Karabin, M (2006). "Prediction of six or eight ears in a drawn cup based on a new anisotropic yield function". International Journal of Plasticity. 22 (1): 174–193. doi:10.1016/j.ijplas.2005.03.013.
- Cardoso, Rui P. R.; Yoon, Jeong Whan; Mahardika, M.; Choudhry, S.; Alves de Sousa, R. J.; Fontes Valente, R. A. (2008). "Enhanced assumed strain (EAS) and assumed natural strain (ANS) methods for one‐point quadrature solid‐shell elements". International Journal for Numerical Methods in Engineering. 75 (2): 156–187. doi:10.1002/nme.2250.
- Stoughton, Thomas B.; Yoon, Jeong Whan (2009). "Anisotropic hardening and non-associated flow in proportional loading of sheet metals". International Journal of Plasticity. 25 (9): 1777–1817. doi:10.1016/j.ijplas.2009.02.003.
- Stoughton, Thomas B.; Yoon, Jeong Whan (2011). "A new approach for failure criterion for sheet metals". International Journal of Plasticity. 27 (3): 440–459. doi:10.1016/j.ijplas.2010.07.004.
