= Shawn Kook =

Australian engineering academic

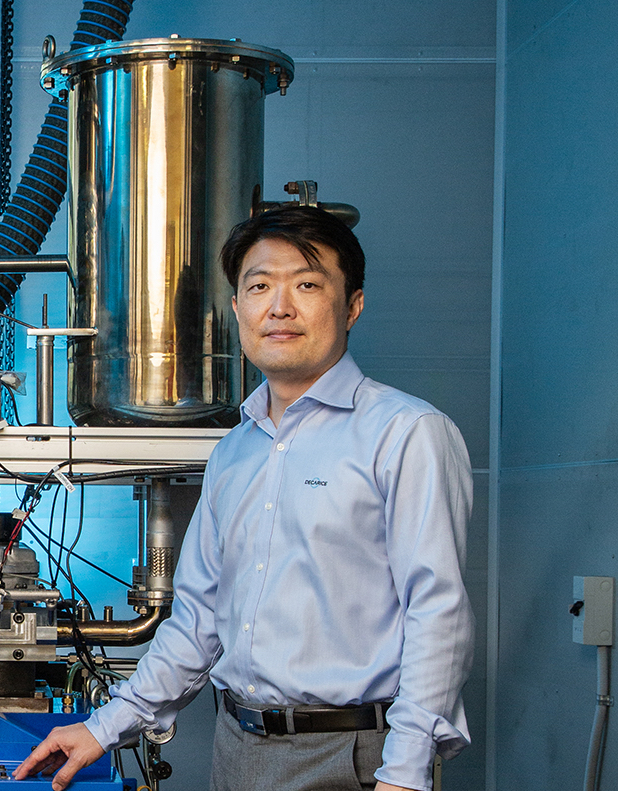
Professor Kook with his hydrogen engine facility

Shawn Kook (Korean: 국상훈) is an Australian engineering professor at the University of New South Wales (UNSW), specialised in power and energy systems, optical/laser-based imaging diagnostics and alternative fuels such as hydrogen, ammonia, ethanol, methanol and biodiesel. Born and raised in South Korea, he received full engineering education at KAIST before he developed his early research career at Sandia National Laboratories, Livermore, California, USA. He joined UNSW in 2009 as a lecturer and was promoted to professor in 2019 at the School of Mechanical and Manufacturing Engineering.

He received many awards and honours including the 2005 SAE International’s Harry L. Horning Memorial Award, the 2013 SAE Ralph Teetor Award, SAE Outstanding Oral Presentation Award (2016 and 2018) and the 2020 iLASS Norman Chigier Reviewer Award. He was elected Fellow of SAE International in 2023 and Fellow of The Combustion Institute in 2025.

Kook is a founder of DeCarice Pty Ltd., a UNSW spin-out company commercialising his hydrogen-diesel hybrid tech.
