= Cybathlon =

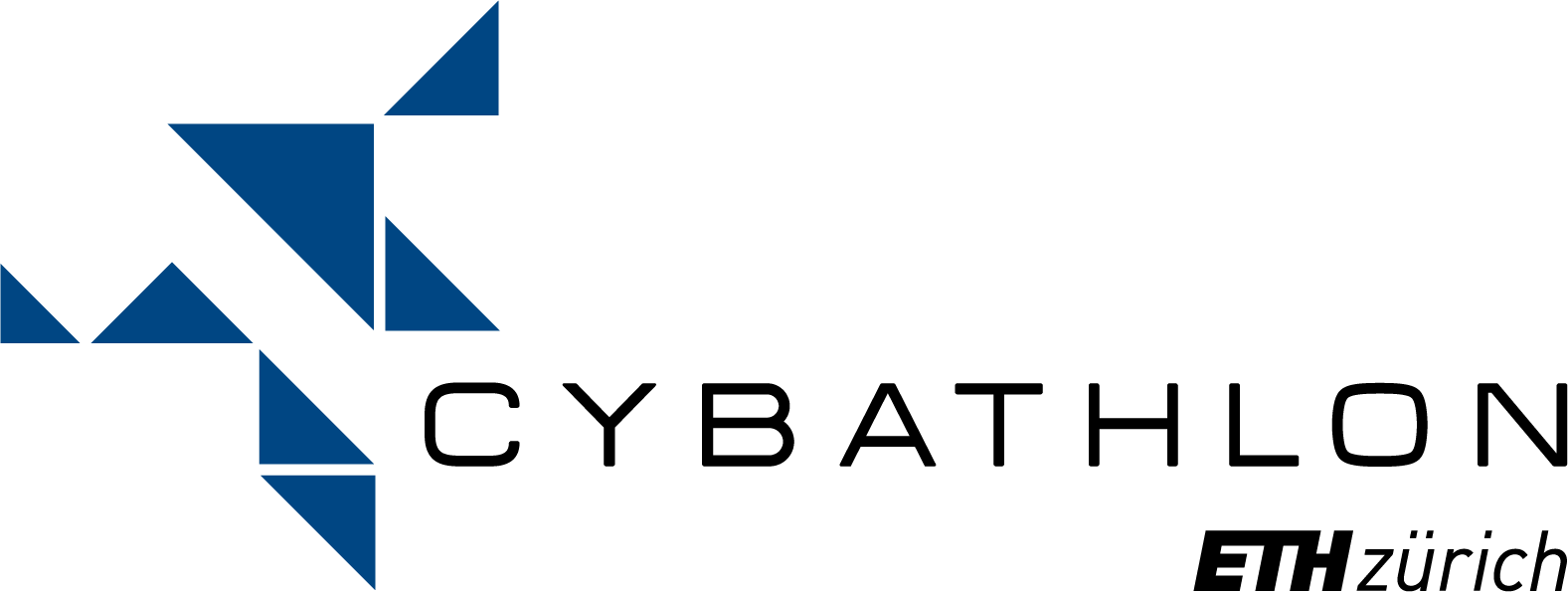
CYBATHLON - For a world without barriers.

CYBATHLON, a project of ETH Zurich, acts as a platform that challenges teams from all over the world to develop assistive technologies suitable for everyday use with and for people with disabilities. The driving force behind CYBATHLON is international competitions and events, in which teams consisting of technology developers from universities, companies or NGOs and a person with disabilities (pilot) tackle unsolved everyday tasks with their latest assistive technologies. Besides the actual competition, the CYBATHLON offers a benchmarking platform to drive forward research on assistance systems for dealing with daily-life challenges, and to promote dialogue with the public for the inclusion of people with disabilities in society.

The first CYBATHLON organised by the Swiss Federal Institute of Technology in Zurich (ETH Zurich) took place in the Swiss Arena in Kloten north of Zurich in Switzerland on 8 October 2016 and was the first international competition of this kind. 66 pilots from 25 nations competed in front of 4600 spectators.

The 2020 CYBATHLON "Global edition" took place on 13–14 November 2020. After having first been postponed due to the COVID-19 pandemic it was reorganized to take place remotely, with teams setting up the infrastructure for the competition at their home bases and with the races, overseen by Cybathlon officials, taking place via video.

CYBATHLON 2024 took place from 25 to 27 October 2024. The third edition of the CYBATHLON took place in a global format at the SWISS Arena in Kloten near Zurich and in local hubs all around the world. 67 international teams from the worlds of academia and industry competed in a competition.

A survey of pilots and technical leads from 2020 suggests considerable success in including pilots in a user-centered design process. Daily life usage of the new assistive technology was less frequent. Both daily life usage and prolonged user involvement were found to be related to race performance at the competition.

== Background ==
The World Health Organization (WHO) estimates that around 15% of people (1.1. billion people worldwide) experience some form of disability. Robert Riener, head of the professorship for Sensory-Motor Systems at ETH Zurich, initiated the CYBATHLON in 2013 as a platform for the development of everyday-suitable assistance systems.

The event organised under the umbrella of ETH Zurich is supported financially as well as ideologically by partners and through patronage.

Whereas other international competitions for disabled athletes, such as the Paralympics, only permit competitors to use unpowered assistive technology, the CYBATHLON encourages the use of performance-enhancing technology such as powered exoskeletons.

Teams can compete in eight different disciplines. A team always consists of a pilot (a person with a disability that meets the inclusion criteria of the respective discipline) and a technology developer (university or company) who work closely together. Teams may include clinicians and other professionals with expertise in areas such as therapy, orthotics and prosthetics. Currently, the split is about 70% with a university and 30% with a company background (e.g. manufacturers of commercially available prostheses).

== Disciplines ==
The CYBATHLON competition includes competitions in a number of different disciplines, each of which has eligibility criteria specific to the pilot and device. The tasks for each of the CYBATHLON disciplines are chosen to reflect everyday activities that are challenging for people with disabilities. While solving the respective tasks in competition, it is shown how well the developed technology is suited to support the pilot in everyday life. Design of the tasks varies from one competition to the next, with the rule book for the competition being published years in advance to allow time for development. The 2016 and 2020 events included six disciplines. Two further disciplines, Assistance Robot Race and Vision Assistance Race, were added for 2024.

Teams compete on courses designed to test how well suited a given technology is to helping its user with everyday tasks, for example climbing stairs or opening doors. In each discipline several pilots compete simultaneously. The tasks and rules are defined in detail for each of the six disciplines. Most important is that the pilots complete the tasks correct, safe and secure. Time comes in as a secondary factor.

- Brain–computer interface (BCI) Race: In the BCI race, pilots with quadriplegia use brain-computer interfaces to control avatars in a computer game. The aim of this technology is to associate specific mental tasks with distinct behaviors of an external device. An example would be the direction of wheelchairs by people with limited ability to move. Teams in the 2016 and 2020 competitions used surface-based BCIs. Implanted BCI systems will be allowed to participate for the first time in 2024.
- Functional electrical stimulation (FES) Bike Race: The FES race is for pilots with paraplegia due to an injury of the central nervous system. A device delivers electrical pulses to muscles to induce contractions. The control system must selectively activate different muscles in a coordinated manner. Functional electrical stimulation enables pilots to perform a pedalling movement on a recumbent bicycle.
- Arm Prosthesis Race: In this race, pilots using an arm prosthesis on one or both sides can compete. Tasks generally involve grasping and manipulation activities, and may also require bimanual coordination or use of a variety of arm postures. The prosthesis has to include the wrist and can be navigated with any kind of control. It can be either body- or externally powered.
- Leg Prosthesis Race: In this race, pilots using a leg prosthesis on one or both sides, including a knee joint, have to perform various movements. Tasks such as standing up and sitting down and walking on uneven terrain involve aspects of locomotion such as balance, stability, agility, mobility, and precision in stepping. Some tests may involve dual-tasking. Teams can use any kind of prosthetic device, with differing control strategies and actuation and sensing principles.
- Exoskeleton Race: In this race, pilots with complete thoracic or lumbar spinal cord injury can compete using an exoskeleton. This powered wearable device supports the body and enables types of anthropomorphic motion used in everyday tasks. Tasks include sitting and standing, walking, and climbing stairs.
- Wheelchair Race: In this race, pilots with severe walking disability can compete using a powered wheelchair. The wheelchairs feature novel technologies for advanced mobility performance to overcome obstacles. Tasks include negotiating steep ramps, staircases, uneven terrain, and confined spaces.
- Assistance Robot Race: The Race consists of tasks that contain elements of human-robot interaction. Both pilots and robots recognize and manipulate various objects, avoid obstacles and react to some dynamic elements on the track.
- Vision Assistance Race: The Race includes elements of spatial orientation and personal mobility, such as boarding and leaving a public bus and react to some dynamic elements. Tasks are tackled under a time constraint. Pilots are to recognize the context of a task and avoid obstacles.

== CYBATHLON 2016 ==
At the Cybathlon competitors, known as "pilots", can use both commercially available bionic technology and lab-developed prototypes. Medals were awarded to both the pilots themselves and to the companies or institutions that create their bionics.

Competitions were organized in such a way that the participants could demonstrate not only their own skills, but also the distinctive qualities of assistive technologies. For example, in the category of "hand prostheses", competitors attempted several food-related fine motor tasks and in the category "Neuro" the participants managed avatars in a specially designed computer game.

The winners:

- Brain-Computer Interface Race: Numa Poujouly - Team Brain Tweakers (Switzerland)
- Functional Electrical Stimulation Bike Race: Mark Muhn - Team Cleveland (US)
- Arm Prosthesis Race: Robert (Bob) Radocy - Team Dipo Power (Netherlands)
- Exoskeleton Race: Andre Van Ruschen - Team ReWalk (Germany)
- Leg Prosthesis Race: Helgi Sveinsson - Team Rheo Knee (Iceland)
- Wheelchair Race: Florian Hauser - Team HSR Enhanced (Switzerland)

== CYBATHLON 2020 ==
CYBATHLON 2020 took place on 13 – 14 November 2020 – globally and in a new format, at the teams' home bases. They set up their infrastructure for the competition and filmed their races. Instead of starting directly next to each other, the pilots started individually and under the supervision of Cybathlon officials. From ETH Zurich, the competitions were broadcast through a new platform in a unique live programme.

The winners:

- Brain-Computer Interface Race: Francesco Bettella – Team WHi (Italy)
- Functional Electrical Stimulation Bike Race: Sander Koomen – Team PULSE Racing (Netherlands)
- Arm Prosthesis Race: Andrej Đukić – Team Maker Hand (Croatia)
- Exoskeleton Race: Kim Byeong-Uk – Team Angel Robotics 1 (South Korea)
- Leg Prosthesis Race: Andre Frei – Team Circleg (Switzerland)
- Wheelchair Race: Florian Hauser – Team Robility enhanced (Switzerland)

== CYBATHLON 2024 ==
CYBATHLON 2024 took place from 25 to 27 October 2024. The third edition of the CYBATHLON took place in a global format at the SWISS Arena in Kloten near Zurich and in local hubs all around the world. 67 international teams from the worlds of academia and industry competed in a unique competition.

The winners:

- Brain-Computer Interface Race: Phillip – PittCrew (US)
- Functional Electrical Stimulation Bike Race: Hunsub Lim -- BeAGain (South Korea)
- Arm Prosthesis Race: Min Xu -- HANDSON (China)
- Exoskeleton Race: Seunghwan Kim -- KAIST (South Korea)
- Leg Prosthesis Race: Andrea Modica -- REHAB TECH LEG (Italy)
- Wheelchair Race: Jaimie Borisoff -- BCIT MAKE+ (Canada)
- Assistance Robot Race: Mattias Atzenhofer -- EDAN (Germany)
- Vision Assistance Race: Péter Sulyok -- EyeRider (Hungary)

== CYBATHLON 2024 JURY AWARD ==
For the first time Jury Award was introduced at CYBATHLON 2024. One competing team from each of the 8 disciplines were honoured with the award.

- WHi Students (Italy): Brain-Computer Interface
- OECU&R-Techs (Japan): Wheelchair
- Sight Guide (Switzerland): Vision Assistance
- KAIST (South Korea): Exoskeleton
- SoftFoot Pro (Italy): LEG Prosthesis
- POLIMI (Italy): FES Bike
- BionIT Labs (Italy): ARM Prosthesis
- BFH-FAIR (Switzerland): Assistance Robot
