= KERIS =

South Korean governmental organization

Korea Education Research Information Service (KERIS)
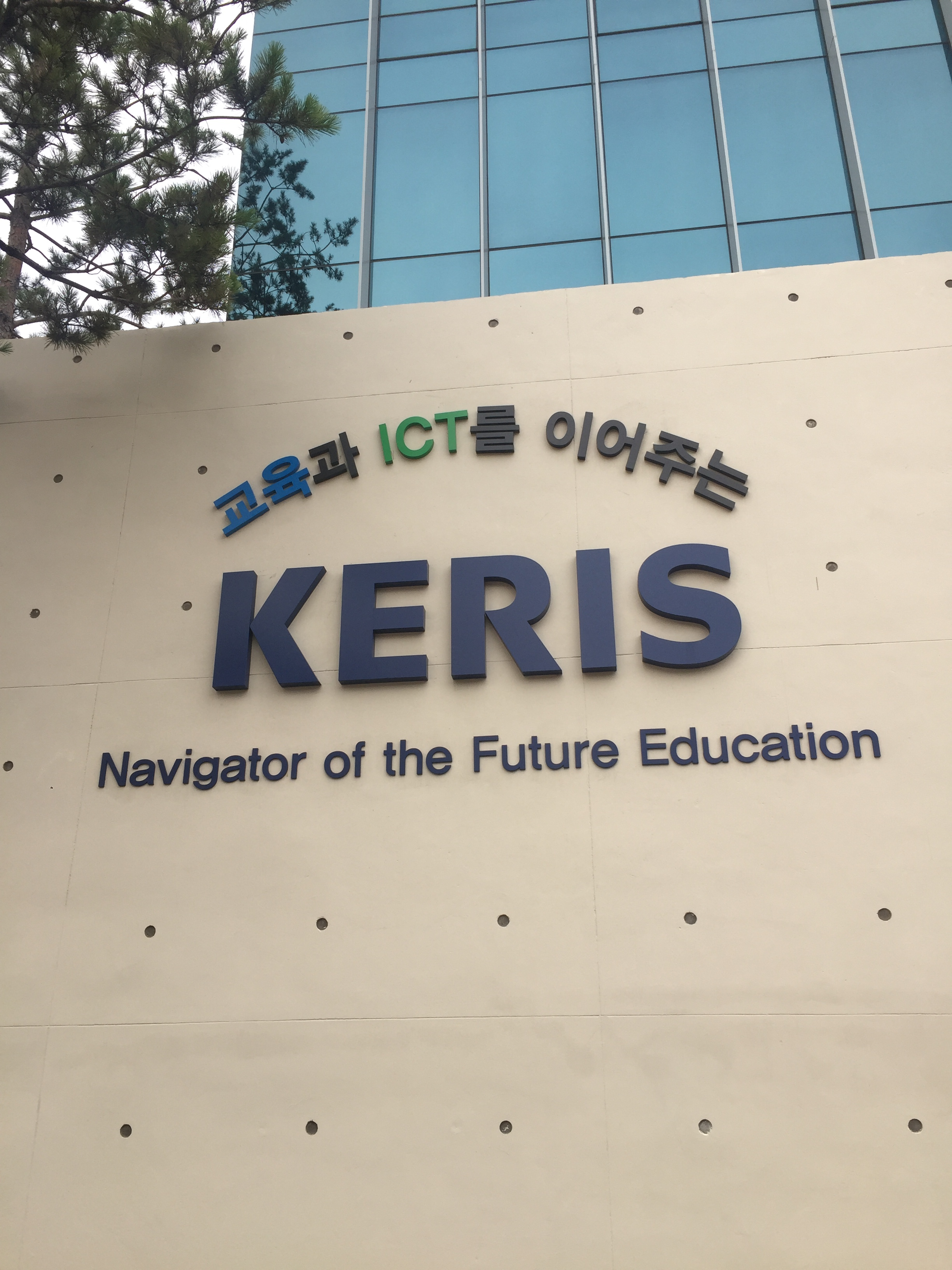

Agency overview
- Formed: April 22, 1999
- Preceding agency: The Korea Multimedia Education Center(KMEC) and The Korea Research Information Center(KRIC)
- Headquarters: Daegu, South Korea
- Employees: 303 (2017.03)
- Agency executive: Park Hae-ja, President
- Website: keris.or.kr

Footnotes
- KERIS English Homepage KERIS President's Welcome Message; About KERIS KERIS Staff

Korean name
- Hangul: 한국교육학술정보원
- Hanja: 韓國敎育學術情報院
- RR: Hanguk gyoyuk haksul jeongbowon
- MR: Han'guk kyoyuk haksul chŏngbowŏn

Korea Education & Research Information Service (KERIS; Korean: 한국교육학술정보원) is a governmental organization under the South Korean Ministry of Education, Science and Technology that develops, proposes, and advises on current and future government policies and initiatives regarding education in South Korea.

Its current focus is on the development of ICT in educational systems in South Korea and abroad and works closely with international organizations such as the World Bank and UNESCO to assist other nations in developing or improving their own ICT infrastructure and implementation.

In addition to policy, KERIS provides educators and the public with educational services such as the National Education Information Service (NEIS) - neis.go.kr, the Research Information Service System (RISS) - riss4u.net, the National Education Service System (EDUNET) - edunet.net, and Korea Open CourseWare (KOCW) - kocw.net.

== History ==
KERIS was established by the KERIS Act (Statue No. 5,685) on April 22, 1999. KERIS came about through the consolidation of the Korean Multimedia Education Center (KMEC) and the Korean Research Information Center (KRIC).

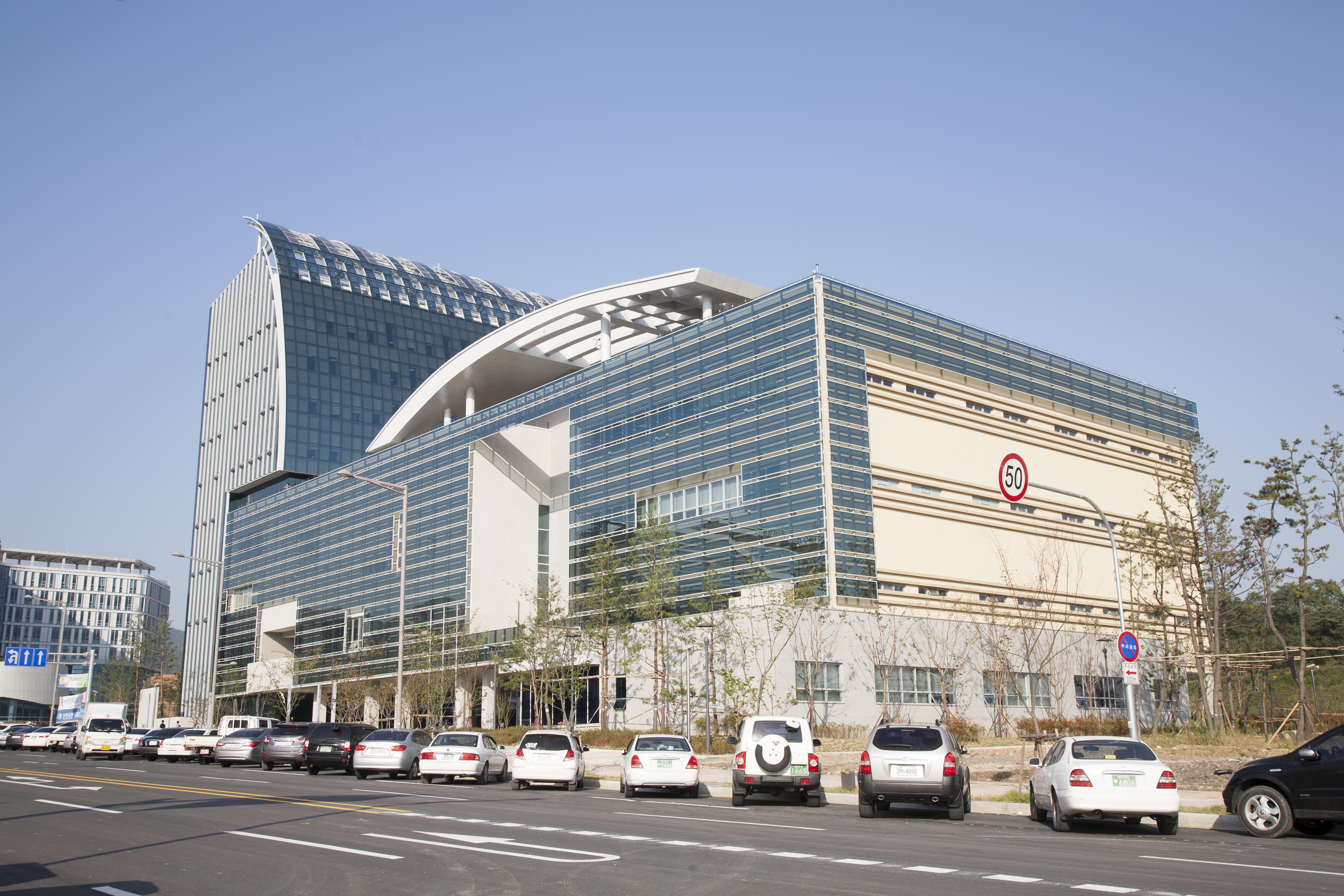
The KERIS building located in the Innovation City area of Daegu, South Korea

September 1996	Koreas first comprehensive educational information service EDUNET was launched.
May 1998	First Research Information Service System (RISS) is launched.
January 1999	The Korea Education and Research Information Service Act was enacted. KMEC and KRIC were consolidated into KERIS.
August 2000	KERIS set education guidelines for elementary and secondary schools on the use of ICT.
March 2001	KERIS was assigned as “National Education and Research Information Center” by the Ministry of Information and Communication.
April 2002	EDUNET subscribers reaches 5 million.
April 2002	KERIS designated as the national operation center for National Education Information System (NEIS) by the Ministry of Education and Human Resources Development.
May 2002	National Educational Resource Sharing System was launched.
November 2002	National Digital Library Support System was launched.
May 2003	Number of RISS users exceeds 0.5 million.
November 2003	100% of all universities and research institutes in Korea integrated with RISS.
February 2008	Opening of the Education Cyber Security Center (ECSC).
June 2008	Dr. Duk-Hoon Kwak takes office as the 5th president of KERIS.
September 2008	Startup of Uzbekistan consulting project.
November 2008	Beginning of "Clean & Green" education campaign.
December 2008	Launch of Educational Information Publication (School Information).
April 2009	Startup of the feasibility study for Colombia education informatization project.
December 2009	Dr. Se-Yeoung Chun takes office as the 6th president of KERIS.
April 2010	Designated as e-Publication standardization forum secretariat.
August 2010	Inaugurated mobile services for educational research information(Cyber Home Learning System, Excellent Instruction Video & KOCW).
March 2011	Startup of the Next-Generation National Education Information System (NEIS).
May 2011	KOCW smartphone application was chosen as "App Award Korea BEST 30".
September 2011	Host "e-Learning Korea 2011".
October 2011	Dr. Chul-Kyun Kim takes office as the 7th President of KERIS.
November 2011	Host Korea-International organizations ICT International symposium 2011.
July 2012	Opened the "0079 Educall" integrated call center for the request and questions about KERIS' services.
November 2012	Mr. Sung-Bin Lim takes office as the 8th president of KERIS.
November 2013	Opening ceremony of the new office building in Daegu.
February 2014	Established primary infrastructure for information and communication managing of NEIS.
December 2015	Launched "RISS Analytics" (Research Information Service System Analytics based on Big data).
December 2015	Certified with ISMS (Information Security Management System Certification).
January 2016	Mr. Seog-Soo Han takes office as the 9th president of KERIS.

== Mission ==
The stated mission of KERIS is to develop human resources through e-Learning, regain public trust in education, lay a foundation for a knowledge and information-based society by activation of e-Learning, and to enhance national education and research competitiveness through academy digitalization. It works towards these goals by being involved in multiple ongoing tasks and projects.

=== Tasks ===
- Improvement in the quality of public education and development of human resources through e-Learning support systems.
- Operation and management of the National Education Information System (NEIS) which is an integrated system designed to provide access to school administrative information nationwide.
- Operation of the National Teaching & Learning Center (EDUNET), a comprehensive educational information service system which allows all teachers, students, and citizens to gain access to valuable educational information and run a voluntary online learning community.
- Operation of the Research Information Service System (RISS), an information-sharing service that provides access to source information and full texts of published journal articles and dissertations both in South Korea and abroad.
- Revision of the metadata standardization format KEM 2.0 to promote the sharing and distribution of educational and research information.
- Organization and operation of the Digital Library Support Center in order to vitalize the operation of school libraries.
- Development, securance, and provision of educational content to improve teaching-learning methodology.
- Investigation and evaluation of the current status of digitalization of the education academy information, and research and support in the development of education policies regarding its implementation.
- Support for the growth of the private education information industry through quality certification and e-Learning exhibitions.
- Support for the digitalization of universities and lifelong education materials.

== Accomplishments ==
- Dec. 2004 - Earned certification on KEM as Korean Standard for educational metadata (KS X 7001).
- July 2005 - Certified with ISO 9001 on KERIS Quality Management System.
- Oct. 2006 - ISO/IEC 20000 Certification for System Support Infrastructure Management of EDUNET and RISS.
- Dec. 2006 - Certified with ISO 9001 on KERIS Quality Management System for international e-Learning consulting.
- Jan. 2007 - Received the 1st UNESCO Prize for ICT in Education.
- Apr. 2007 - Received the IMS Learning Impact Platinum Award.
- Nov. 2008 - Korean Agency for Technology and Standards (KATS) set "e-Learning quality certification guideline" developed by the KERIS as Korean Industrial Standards (KS).
- Apr. 2009 - 'Educational information standard' developed by the KERIS was set as an international standard (IS).
- Dec. 2010 - "Korea Open CourseWare (KOCW) smartphone application" won the first prize in Web Award Korea 2010 (public education area).
- Jul. 2011 - Designated as e-Learning promotion institution.
- Jun. 2012 - Selected as an Excellent Public Organization in Institutional Management.
- Dec. 2012 - Selected as an Excellent Public Organization in Customer Service.
- May. 2013 - Awarded Platinum IMS Learning Impact Award 2013.
- Jul. 2014 - Won a Prime Minister's citation for merit of Information Assurance.
- Dec. 2015 - Awarded Web Award Korea “Public Service” the grand prize (EDUNET).

== Project areas ==
=== Research and Planning ===
KERIS conducts research and planning in a variety of sectors related to educational policy and planning in Korea. Its main points of interest cover various aspects of ICT in education and include: the development of human resources; the training of elementary and secondary school teachers and administrators; the effectiveness of proposed and ongoing policy initiatives; and the future and current integration of e-Learning materials and ICT into the education system. Through a close working relationship with the Korean Ministry of Education and Human Resources Development and offices of education, KERIS is able to receive feedback and suggestions on the results of its research and planning.

=== e-Learning in education ===
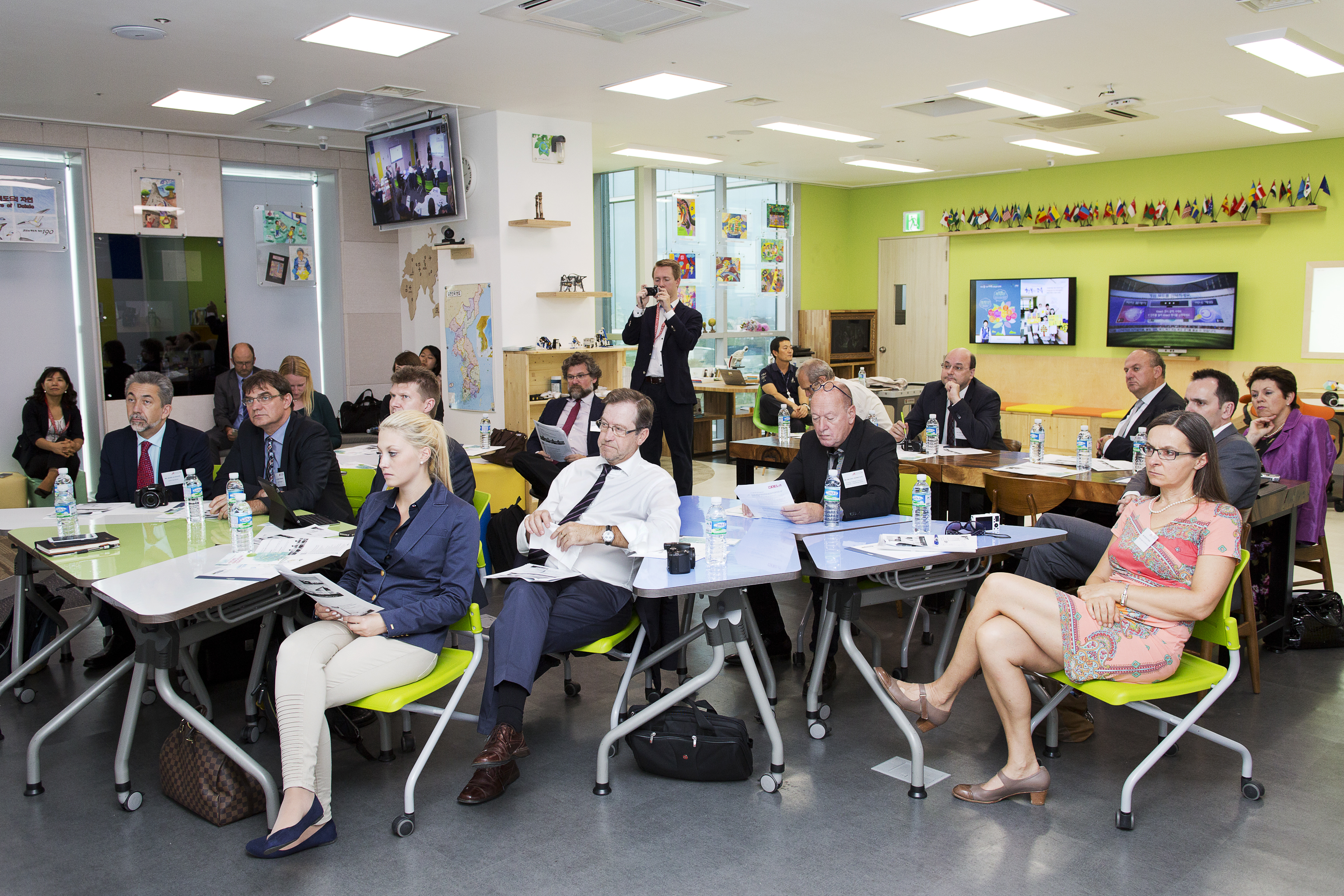
A ubiquitous-learning(u-learning) classroom where students use electronic textbooks in the form of tablet PCs. KERIS is currently conducting research on the effects of such environments on learning.

KERIS is involved in many aspects of e-Learning in efforts to reduce the cost of private tutoring and strengthen the existing education system. It conducts research, disseminates planning and policy proposals, assists in the diffusion and adoption of e-Learning materials and evaluates their effectiveness. In addition to these activities, KERIS oversees a variety of e-Learning services through the web.

The National Teaching & Learning Center (EDUNET), is a comprehensive education information service in Korea with public access, but designed specifically for teachers and students. Through linkage to the central government, local governments, and schools, EDUNET provides a range of instructional and learning support material and other education-related information.

The Cyber Home Learning System is a web-based that enables self-study at home or at sites other than schools. Students can learn at their own pace with adjustable materials to suit individual needs.

The Digital Library Support System (DLS) is a system that supports school libraries built within metropolitan and provincial Offices of Education, and is an Internet-based, one-stop service system that helps school libraries carry out the functions of a teaching-learning support center, digital library, and reading & culture center.

=== Research Information Network ===
The Research Information Service System (RISS) is an academic information sharing service with a cooperative network among university libraries and related institutions that provides access to source information and full texts of journal articles and dissertations both in South Korea and abroad. The intention is to contribute to world competitiveness in academic research. The RISS also provides services such as a union catalog, interlibrary loans, and dissertations in order to promote the sharing and distribution of research information.

=== e-Administration ===
KERIS maintains and operates the National Education Information System (NEIS) which is an integrated e-Administration system designed to enhance the efficiency of general educational administrative tasks, and also to improve the work environment for teachers and provide a new educational administration information service for the public. The NEIS provides access to all educational information in South Korea by connecting all elementary and secondary schools with various branches and offices of the government through the Internet.

== International Cooperation ==
KERIS maintains close working relationships with educational institutes and experts around the world. To promote the implementation of ICT in education KERIS holds numerous collaborative seminars and training programs as well as joint research projects and seminars.

== See also ==
- Digital Textbook
- Education in South Korea
- Education in North Korea
- Information Communication Technology
- e-learning
