= Park Hae-ja =

South Korean politician (born 1956)

- 박혜자

President of the Korea Education Research Information Service
- In office 16 April 2019 – 30 November 2021
- Minister: Yoo Eun-hae
- Preceded by: Han Suk-soo
- Succeeded by: Suh You-mi

Member of the National Assembly
- In office 30 May 2012 – 29 May 2016
- Preceded by: Cho Young-taek
- Succeeded by: Song Ki-seok
- Constituency: Gwangju Seo A

Personal details
- Born: 23 May 1956 (age 70)
- Party: Democratic
- Education: Ewha Womans University; University of Oregon; University of Seoul

Park Hae-ja (Korean: 박혜자; Hanja: 朴惠子; born 23 May 1956) is a South Korean politician and a former professor of administration at Honam University currently serving as the 10th - and the first woman - President of KERIS, Korea Education & Research Information Service.

From 1989 Park had been teaching administration at Honam University for over two decades and also served as Dean of its School of Humanities & Social Science. Park also worked at South Jeolla Provincial government as its head of Women and Welfare Bureau for 4 years which was unusual for non-state exam takers to have their tenure extended.

After serving 4 years at the National Assembly from Gwangju from 2012 to 2016, Park failed to earn her party's nomination twice for her re-election - in 2016 general election and 2018 bi-election.

In 2017 she worked for President Moon Jae-in as a spokesperson of his presidential campaign.

In 2021 Park resigned from the KERIS reportedly to run for the next Education Superintendent for Gwangju.

Park holds four degrees - a bachelor and a master's in politics from Ewha Womans University, a Master of Science from University of Oregon and a doctorate in administration from University of Seoul.

== Electoral history ==
Election	Year	District	Party affiliation	Votes	Percentage of votes	Results
19th National Assembly General Election	2012	Gwangju Seo A	Democratic United Party	25,598	42.1%	Won
