= Song Ki-seok =

South Korean politician (born 1963)

- 송기석

Member of the National Assembly
- In office 1 June 2016 – 8 February 2018
- Preceded by: Park Hae-ja
- Succeeded by: Song Kap-sok
- Constituency: Gwangju West District 1st

Personal details
- Born: 28 October 1963 (age 62) Goheung County, South Jeolla Province, South Korea
- Party: Bareunmirae
- Other political affiliations: People's Party (2016–2018)
- Children: 2 sons
- Education: Konkuk University
- Occupation: Judge, lawyer, politician

Song Ki-seok (Korean: 송기석, born 28 October 1963) is a South Korean judge, lawyer and politician. He once served as a member of National Assembly in West District, Gwangju.

Born at Goheung County, Song attended to Konkuk University. He passed to the judicial examination in 1993 and became a judge. He gained popularity while working as a judge.

Song entered to People's Party in the early 2016, and declared to run as MP for West District 1st constituency. Despite a controversy during the primary, Song was officially selected as the candidate. He then defeated Song Kap-sok of Democratic Party. However, he was involved in a corruption case and lost his membership on 8 February 2018. His position was then succeeded by Song Kap-sok, his ex-rival.

He is currently working as a lawyer.

== Election results ==
=== General elections ===
Year	Constituency	Political party	Votes (%)	Remarks
2016	West District (1st constituency)	People's	56.23%	Won
