= Song Kap-seok =

South Korean politician (born 1966)

- 송갑석

Member of the National Assembly
- Incumbent
- Assumed office 14 June 2018
- Preceded by: Song Ki-seok
- Constituency: Gwangju West 1st

Personal details
- Born: 10 October 1966 (age 59) Goheung County, South Jeolla Province, South Korea
- Party: Democratic
- Other political affiliations: Uri; NPAD
- Education: University of South Jeolla Province
- Occupation: Activist, politician
- Religion: Roman Catholic (Christian name : Daniel)

Song Kap-seok (Korean: 송갑석, born 10 October 1966) is a South Korean activist and politician serving as a member of National Assembly for West District of Gwangju, along with Chun Jung-bae. He is also the sole Democratic Party MP in Gwangju.

== Biography ==
Born in Goheung, Song attended to University of South Jeolla Province. He was a socialist activist from the end of 1980s to the early of 1990s. In 1990, he was arrested and detained until 1995.

After released, he started his political career. He then ran as an nonpartisan MP for South District of Gwangju in 2000, but was defeated with the vote of 9.17%. He then endorsed Roh Moo-hyun during the presidential election in 2002.

During the mid of 2000s, Song moved to the United States and started his further study. He then returned to South Korea and spoke up for human rights. Following the activities, Song ran again as independent MP for West 1st constituency but lost again.

Song later entered to the Democratic Party and contested again for the same constituency but was again defeated by Song Ki-sok of the People's Party, then Bareunmirae Party. Following the election annulment of Song Ki-sok in the early 2018, Song Kap-sok was considered again as a possible candidate. Despite a controversy during the primary, Song was officially selected as the candidate and defeated the PDP candidate Kim Myong-jin with a high margin.

== Controversies ==
On 12 August 2018, Song had suggested a law amendment - replacing abductee (to North Korea) to missing - with several MPs from the same party. This movement was harshly criticised by abductees' relatives.

Two days later, Family Association for Abductees of 25 June declared to sue Song as defamation and offending National Security Act. The association condemned his action as "disrespecting victims and its relatives". They also continued that they would not decline their lawsuit.

Song was reported that he was praising Kim Il Sung during the investigation at Agency for National Security Planning (now National Intelligence Service) in 1991. During that time, he said "I admire Kim Il Sung. I feel happy when his healthy and vigorous face is appeared on television. The government of DPRK, who guarantees justice and autonomy, is the sole legal government of Korea. Korea must be reunified as DPRK because it is the true reunification."

== Election results ==
=== General elections ===
Year	Constituency	Political party	Votes (%)	Remarks
2000	Gwangju South	Independent	8,649 (9.17%)	Defeated
2012	Gwangju West A	Independent	10,177 (16.74%)	Defeated
2016	Gwangju West A	Democratic	25,474 (35.33%)	Defeated
2018	Gwangju West A	Democratic	60,279 (83.46%)	Won
2020	Gwangju West A	Democratic	69,285 (82.18%)	Won
