= EDUNET =

EDUNET is a national teaching-learning center in the Republic of Korea. It was launched on September 11, 1996, and has been operated by the Korea Education and Research Information Service (KERIS).
