= Polestar Xeus =

Cloud computing software

- Developer(s): NKIA Co., Ltd.
- Website: www.nkia.co.kr

Polestar Xeus is cloud computing software that is manufactured by NKIA Corporation in South Korea and is used to manage IaaS solutions. It provides various functions required for the management of cloud systems, such as reporting on SLA and usage amount for particular users or times, management of construction, performance, events, and statistics for virtual machines, storage, and networks, and resource use policy management, and features a GUI-based drag-and-drop workflow and an API for connection to other cloud systems.

Polestar Xeus is compatible with IaaS solutions including VMware vSphere, Microsoft Hyper-V, Citrix Xen, and Red Hat Enterprise Virtualization.

NKIA provides Polestar Xeus to the National Computing and Information Agency in South Korea.
