= Accent R =

- Industry: software
- Founded: 1980
- Headquarters: United States

Accent R (the "R" is for Relational: Relational database, Relational model), is a fourth-generation programming language that was first installed in 1980. Initially available for Digital Equipment Corporation's DECsystem-10 and DECSYSTEM-20, a VAX version was released and installed January 1982.

It was developed by National Information Systems, Inc (NIS), and contains a compiled structured programming language that can replace 3GL coding. Accent R goes beyond use of RMS: Oracle and Sybase are among the database systems supported.

Accent R is also supported on Linux.

== About National Information Systems, Inc (NIS) ==
National Information Systems, initially a Silicon Valley company, was founded in 1972 as a software company focused on providing tools for software developers. Their DPL (Data Processing Language), written for the DECsystem-10 and DECSYSTEM-20, competed with Software House's System 1022. Both were used in the financial services industry, where some companies used both.

By 1988 NIS worked out and announced a cooperative marketing agreement with Sybase.

The company's headquarters are now in Reno, Nevada.
