= KAIST =

South Korean public research university

Coordinates: 36.372°N 127.363°E

- 한국과학기술원
- Type: National
- Established: 1971
- Affiliations: AEARU, AOTULE, APRU, ASPIRE League.
- Budget: ₩1 trillion (US$878 million) (FY2021)
- President: Choongsik Bae (배충식)
- Faculty: 704 (2024)
- Administrative staff: 973 (2024)
- Students: 12,348 (2024)
- Undergraduates: 4,009
- Postgraduates: 3,767
- Doctoral students: 2,896
- Other students: 1,676 Joint MS-PhD
- Location: Yuseong, Daejeon, South Korea
- Campus: Urban 1,432,882 square metres (354.07 acres) (Daedeok Campus) 413,346 square metres (102.14 acres) (Seoul Campus)
- Website: kaist.ac.kr

- Korea Advanced Institute of Science and Technology
- Hangul: 한국과학기술원
- Hanja: 韓國科學技術院
- RR: Hanguk gwahak gisurwon
- MR: Han'guk kwahak kisurwŏn

KAIST
- Hangul: 카이스트
- RR: Kaiseuteu
- MR: K'aisŭt'ŭ

KAIST (formerly the Korea Advanced Institute of Science and Technology) is a national research university located in Daedeok Innopolis, Daejeon, South Korea. KAIST was established by the Korean government in 1971 as the nation's first public, research-oriented science and engineering institution. KAIST has 10,504 full-time students and 1,342 faculty researchers (as of the Fall 2019 Semester) and had a total budget of US$765 million in 2013, of which US$459 million was from research contracts.

In 2007, KAIST first began partnering with international institutions to adopt dual degree programs for its students. The current list of partner institutions includes New York University, the Technical University of Denmark, Carnegie Mellon University, the Georgia Institute of Technology, Technische Universität Berlin, and the Technical University of Munich.

== History ==
Korean representatives and Frederick E. Terman discuss the establishment of the institute.

The institute was founded in 1971 as the Korea Advanced Institute of Science (KAIS) by a loan of US$6 million (US$50 million 2026) from the United States Agency for International Development (USAID) and supported by President Park Chung-Hee. The institute's academic scheme was mainly designed by Frederick E. Terman, then vice president of Stanford University, and Dr. KunMo Chung, a professor at the Polytechnic Institute of Brooklyn. The institute's two main functions were to train advanced scientists and engineers and develop a structure of graduate education in the country. Research studies had begun by 1973 and undergraduates studied for bachelor's degrees by 1984.

In 1981, the government merged the Korean Advanced Institute of Science and the Korea Institute of Science and Technology (KIST) to form the Korea Advanced Institute of Science and Technology, or KAIST, under the leadership of physics professor Choochon Lee. Due to differing research philosophies, KIST and KAIST split in 1989. In the same year KAIST and the Korea Institute of Technology (KIT) combined and moved from Seoul to the Daedeok Science Town in Daejeon. The first act of President Suh upon his inauguration in July 2006 was to lay out the KAIST Development Plan. The 'KAIST Development Five-Year Plan' was finalized on February 5, 2007, by KAIST Steering Committee. The goals of KAIST set by Suh were to become one of the best science and technology universities in the world, and to become one of the top-10 universities by 2011. In January 2008, the university dropped its full name, Korea Advanced Institute of Science and Technology, and changed its official name to only KAIST.

=== Timeline ===
February 16, 1971	Korea Advanced Institute of Science (KAIS), Hongneung Campus, Seoul is established
March 5, 1973	Candidates matriculate for master's degree
August 20, 1975	First commencement for the master's program
September 12, 1975	Candidates matriculate for doctorate degree
August 19, 1978	First commencement for the doctoral program
December 31, 1980	Korea Advanced Institute of Science and Technology (KAIST) is formed by merger with KIST
December 27, 1984	Korea Institute of Technology (KIT) is established in Daejeon, South Korea
March 28, 1986	First matriculation for undergraduates
June 12, 1989	KAIST and KIST separate, KAIST retains institution name
July 4, 1989	KAIST merges with KIT, relocates to Daejeon
December 17, 1990	First commencement for bachelor's degree students
October 1, 1996	Establishes Korea Institute of Advanced Study (KIAS)
May 4, 2004	Founds National Nanofab Center (NNFC)
January 1, 2008	Officially changes name to KAIST, replacing the spelled-out name
March 1, 2009	Acquires Information and Communications University (ICU), renaming it KAIST Information Technology Convergence Campus

== Academics ==
=== Academics ===
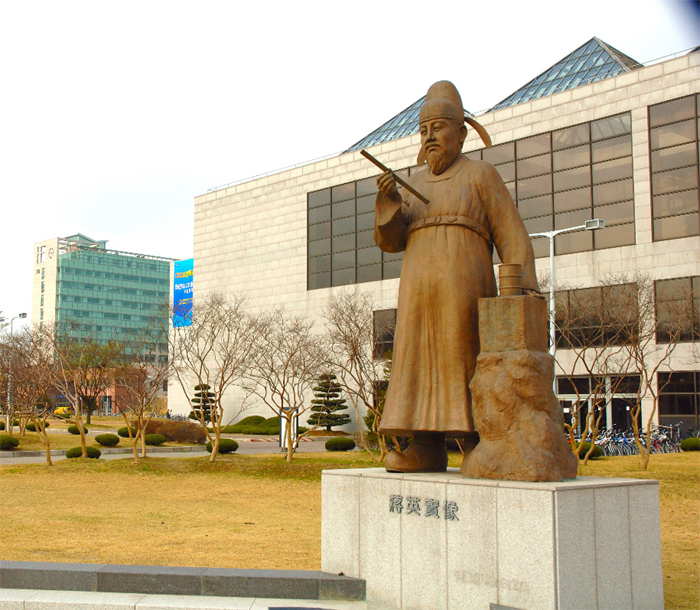
A statue of Chang Yŏngsil, a Korean scientist, in front of science library, Daejeon campus

Admission to KAIST is based on overall grades, grades on math and science courses, recommendation letters from teachers, study plan, personal statements, and other data, and does not rely on a standardized test conducted by the university. In 2014, the acceptance rate for local students was 14.9%, and for international students at 13.2%.

Full scholarships are given to all students including international students in the bachelor, master and doctorate courses. Doctoral students are given military-exemption benefits from South Korea's compulsory military service. Up to 80% of courses taught in KAIST are conducted in English.

Undergraduate students can join the school through an “open major system” that allows students to take classes for three terms and then choose a discipline that suits their aptitude, and undergraduates are allowed to change their major anytime. KAIST has also produced many doctorates through the integrated master's and doctoral program and early-completion system. Students must publish papers in internationally renowned academic journals for graduation.

=== Students ===
KAIST produced 69,388 alumni from 1975 to 2021, with 19,457 bachelor's, 35,513 master's, and 14,418 doctorate degree holders. As of Spring 2021, 10,793 students were enrolled in KAIST with 3,605 bachelor's, 3,069 master's, 1,354 joint M.S.-Ph.D.'s, and 2,765 doctoral students. More than 70 percent of KAIST undergraduates come from specialized science high schools. 817 international students from 81 countries are studying at KAIST (as of spring semester 2021), making it one of the most ethnically diverse universities in the country. Countries with the most prevalent number of international alumni include China, Vietnam, Pakistan, and Indonesia. KAIST also has an international student body government known as KISA (KAIST International Students Association) with the mission of serving the international community's interests and needs.

== Organization ==
KAIST is organized into 6 colleges, 2 schools and 33 departments/divisions.

- College of Natural Sciences
  - Department of Physics
  - Department of Mathematical Sciences
  - Department of Chemistry
  - Graduate School of Nanoscience and Technology
- College of Life Science and Bioengineering
  - Department of Biological Sciences
  - Graduate School of Medical Science and Engineering
- College of Engineering
  - School of Mechanical and Aerospace Engineering
    - Department of Mechanical Engineering
    - Department of Aerospace Engineering
  - School of Electrical Engineering
  - School of Computing
  - Department of Civil and Environmental Engineering
  - Department of Bio and Brain Engineering
  - Department of Industrial Design
  - Department of Industrial and Systems Engineering
    - Graduate School of Data Science
  - Department of Chemical and Biomolecular Engineering
  - Department of Materials Science and Engineering
  - Department of Nuclear and Quantum Engineering
  - Department of Information and Communications Engineering
  - The Cho Chun Shik Graduate School of Green Transportation
  - Graduate School of EEWS (Energy, Environment, Water, and Sustainability)
  - The Kim Jaechul Graduate School of AI (GSAI)
- College of Liberal Arts and Convergence Science
  - School of Digital Humanities and Computational Social Sciences
  - Graduate School of Culture Technology
  - Moon Soul Graduate School of Future Strategy (Korean only)
  - Graduate School of Science and Technology Policy
- College of Business
  - MS/Ph.D
  - School of Business and Technology Management
  - School of Management Engineering
  - Graduate School of Finance
  - Graduate School of Information and Media Management
  - Graduate School of Green Growth
  - School of Transdisciplinary Studies

KAIST also has three affiliated institutes including the Korea Institute of Advanced Study (KIAS), National NanoFab Center (NNFC), and Korea Science Academy (KSA).

== Campus ==
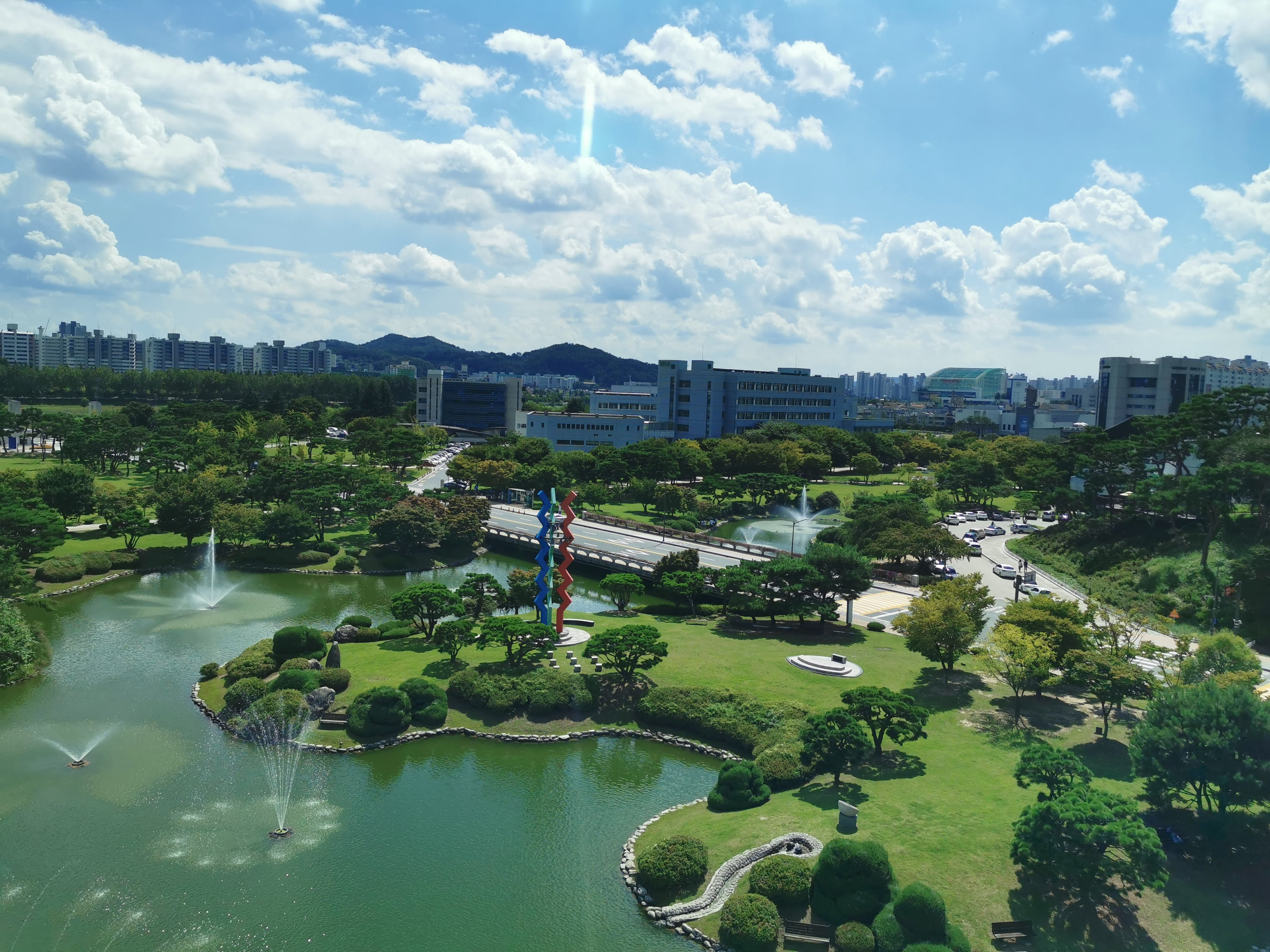
A view of the main campus

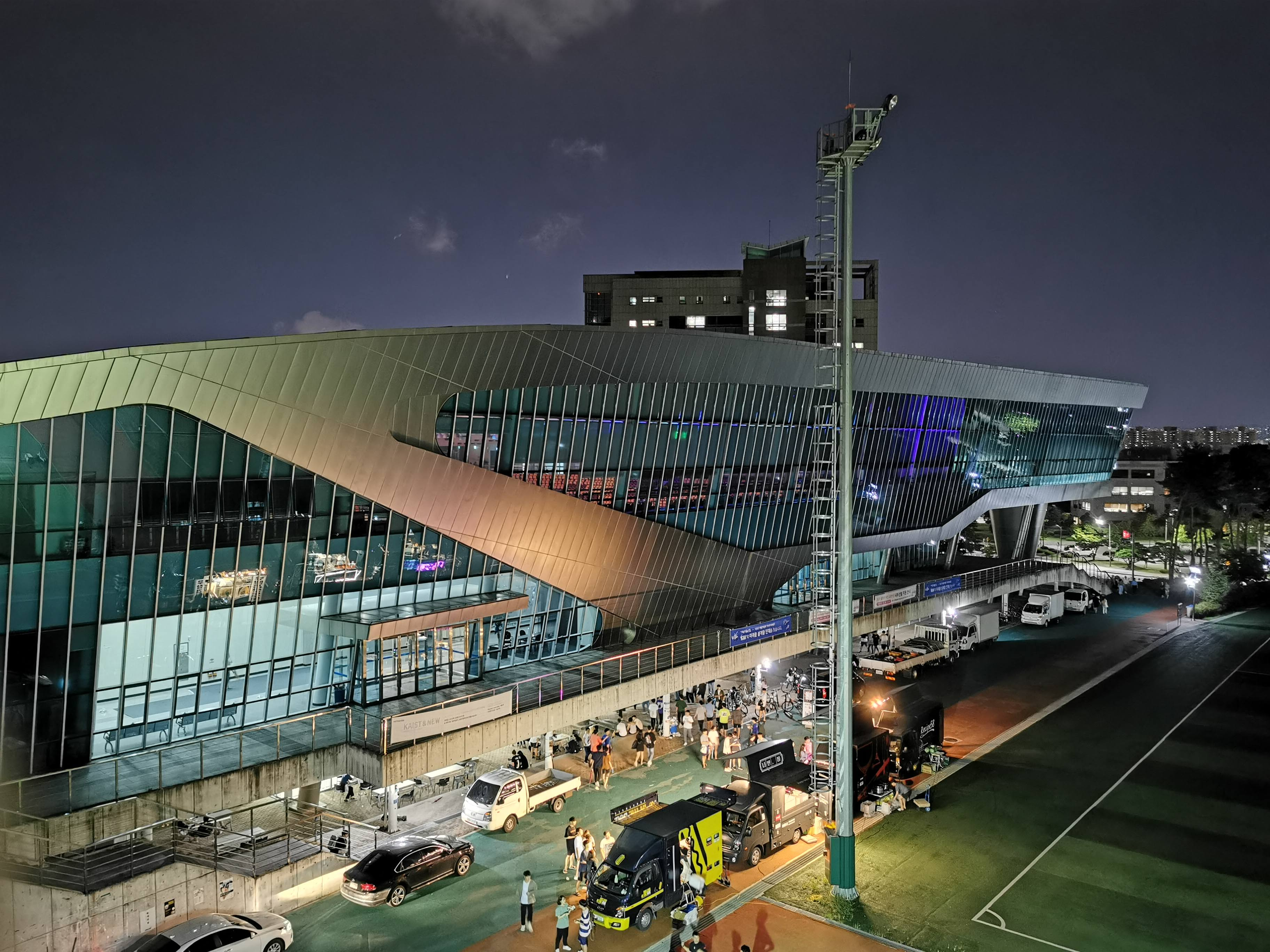
KAIST's sport complex at night

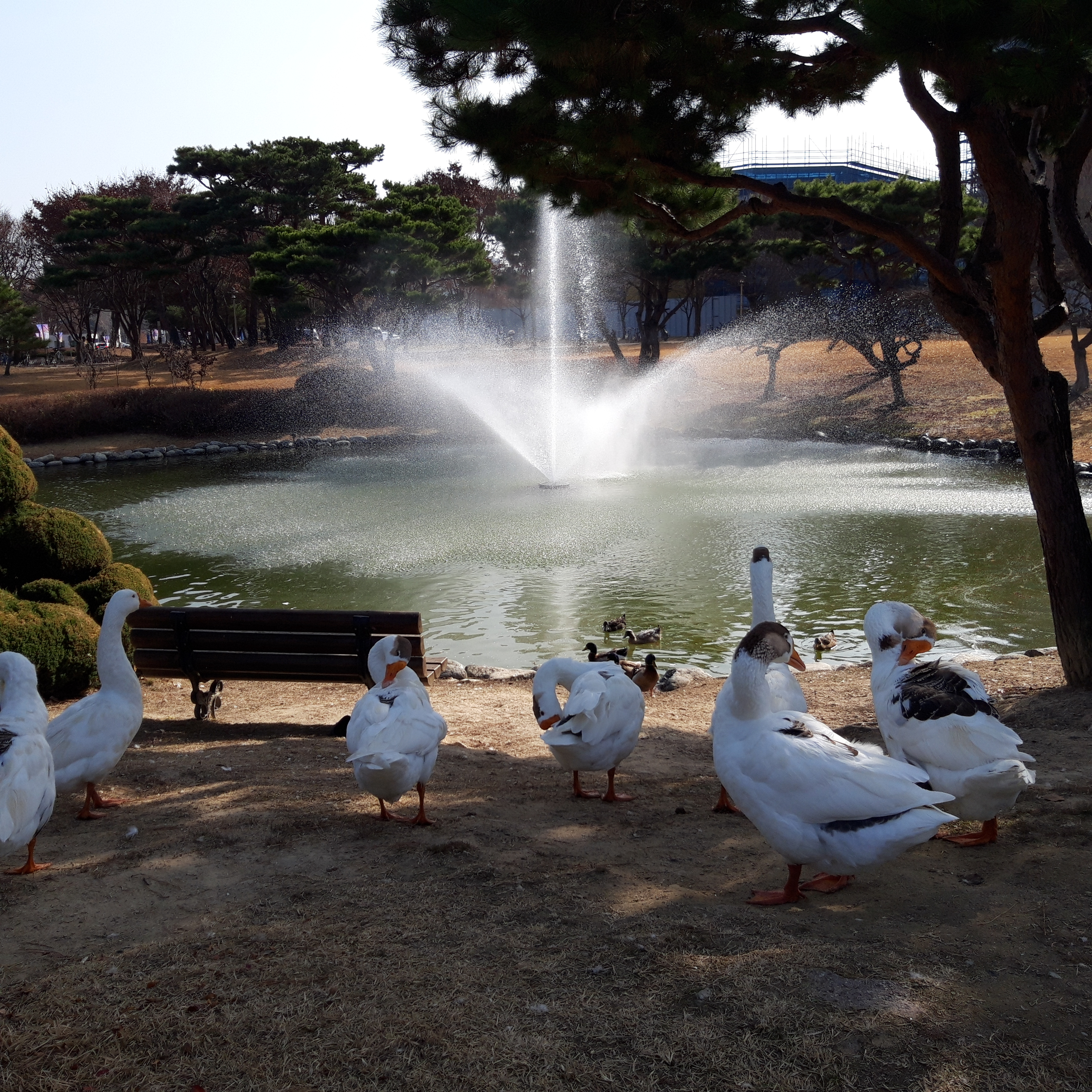
Geese and ducks residing in the KAIST campus lake

KAIST has two campuses in Daejeon and one campus in Seoul. The university is mainly located in the Daedeok Science Town in the city of Daejeon, 150 kilometers south of the capital Seoul. Daedeok is also home to some 50 public and private research institutes, universities such as CNU and high-tech venture capital companies.

Most lectures, research activities, and housing services are located in the Daejeon main campus. It has a total of 29 dormitories. Twenty-three dormitories for male students and four dormitories for female students are located on the outskirts of the campus, and two apartments for married students are located outside the campus.

The Seoul campus is the home to the College of Business and the Kim Jaechul Graduate School of AI (GSAI). The graduate schools of finance, management and information & media management are located there. The total area of the Seoul campus is 413,346 m^{2} (4,449,220 sq ft). KAIST has been internationally accredited in business education, and hosts the secretariat of the Association of Asia-Pacific Business Schools (AAPBS).

The Munji campus, the former campus of Information and Communications University until its merger with KAIST, is located ca. 4 km (2.5 mi) away from the main campus. It has two dormitories, one for undergraduate students and the other for graduate students. The Institute for Basic Science (IBS) Center for Axion and Precision Physics Research is located here doing particle and nuclear physics related to dark matter and the Rare Isotope Science Project has the Superconducting Radio Frequency test facility.

=== Main library ===
The KAIST main library was established in 1971 as KAIS library, and it went through a merge and separation process with KIST library. It merged with KIT in March 1990. A contemporary 5 story building was constructed as the main library, and it is being operated with an annex library. The library uses the American LC Classification Schedule. The library underwent expansion and remodeling, which finished in 2018, to include conference rooms, collaboration rooms, and media rooms.

=== Event ===
KAIST's Seokrim Taeulje is a festival held by KAIST for three days every spring semester. The festival preparation committee under the undergraduate student council will be in charge of planning and execution, various food booths and experience booths will be opened, and stage events such as club performances and a song festival will be held. Also called the Cherry Blossom Festival, students eat strawberries on the lawn.

== Research ==
KI consists of five institutes and three centers: KI for BioCentury, KI for Information Technology Convergence, KI for Robotics, KI for NanoCentury, KI for Health Science and Technology, Saudi Aramco-KAIST CO2 Management Center, Fourth Industrial Revolution Intelligence Center, and Center for Epidemic Preparedness. Each KI is operated as an independent research center at the level of a college, receiving support in terms of finance and facilities. In terms of ownership of intellectual property rights, KAIST holds 2,694 domestic patents and 723 international patents so far.

=== Electric vehicles ===
Researchers at KAIST have developed the Online Electric Vehicle (OLEV), a technique of powering vehicles through cables underneath the surface of the road via non-contact magnetic charging (a power source is placed underneath the road surface and power is wirelessly picked up on the vehicle itself). In July 2009 the researchers successfully supplied up to 60% power to a bus over a gap of 12 cm (4.7 in) from a power line embedded in the ground using power supply and pick up technology developed in-house.

== Controversy ==
=== Suicides ===
In 2011, a punitive tuition system was introduced to KAIST, which charged students for tuition only if their grade-point average dropped below 3.0 on a 4.0 scale. This change, along with a new system mandating English-only classes, led to 11 members of KAIST committing suicide from 2011 to 2016. The university has since reversed the punitive tuition system.

=== Development of autonomous arms ===
In February 2018, the Korea Times published an article which stated that KAIST was starting an AI weapons research project together with the Korean arms manufacturer Hanwha. The allegations were of developing lethal autonomous weapons with Hanwha. This has led to researchers from 30 countries boycotting KAIST, which has denied existence of the program.

=== China tech leaks ===
In February 2024, a KAIST professor was found guilty by an appellate court of leaking autonomous vehicle technologies to China between 2017 and 2020, leading to a two year prison sentence. Despite a lower court having sentenced the professor to two years in prison with a three-year suspended sentence in 2021, KAIST did not take any disciplinary action, instead offering only a public apology and a promise to improve its transparency

== Rankings and reputation ==
University rankings
QS National	General	2
THE National	General	3
ARWU National	Research	3–6
QS Asia (Asia version)	General	15
THE Asia (Asia version)	General	17
USNWR Asia	General	=65
ARWU World	Research	201–300
QS World	General	53
THE World	General	=70
USNWR World	General	=296

=== Overall rankings ===
KAIST was ranked 56th worldwide in the QS WUR 2024, 91st worldwide in the THE WUR 2023, 282nd in the USNWR Rankings 2022-2023, and 201-300th in ARWU 2022.

KAIST was the 111th best-ranked university worldwide in 2022 in terms of aggregate performance across THE, QS, and ARWU, as reported by ARTU.

Before THE and QS started publishing separate rankings in 2010, the jointly published THE–QS World University Rankings ranked KAIST globally at 160th (2004), 143rd (2005), 198th (2006), 132nd (2007), 95th (2008), and 69th (2009).

In 2019 Thomson Reuters named KAIST the 34th most innovative university in the world and the 2nd most innovative university in the Asia-Pacific region.

KAIST was ranked 61-70th worldwide in the THE World Reputation Rankings 2022.

=== Subject/Area rankings ===
- QS University Subject Rankings (2017):
  - 13th, materials science
  - 15th, civil engineering and structural engineering
  - 15th, mechanical engineering
  - 15th, chemical engineering
  - 17th, electrical engineering
  - 18th, chemistry
  - 33rd, computer science and information systems
  - 44th, Physics & Astronomy
  - 47th, Mathematics

In the 2009 THE-QS World University Rankings (in 2010 Times Higher Education World University Rankings and QS World University Rankings parted ways to produce separate rankings) for Engineering & IT, the university was placed 21st in the world and 1st in Korea.

In 2009, KAIST's department of industrial design has also been listed in the top 30 Design Schools by Business Week.

=== Young University rankings ===
Times Higher Education ranked KAIST the 3rd best university in the world under the age of 50 years in its 2015 league table.

=== Graduate Employability rankings ===
KAIST graduates ranked 67th worldwide in the Times Higher Education's Global University Employability Ranking 2022, and 77th worldwide in the QS Graduate Employability Rankings 2022.

== Notable faculty and staff ==
- Soon-dal Choi, electrical engineer; successfully developed and launched a satellite, KITSAT-3
- Dong-ho Cho, electrical engineer; developed online electric vehicle (OLEV), listed on Time Magazine's top fifty inventions of 2010
- Jun-ho Choi, discoverer of hSNF5 body protein involved in reproduction of Papilloma virus
- Yang-Kyu Choi, developed world's smallest terabyte flash memory
- Cho Zang-hee, developed PET Imaging while at Colombia, developed Imaging for MRI/PET/CAT at KAIS, Later KAIST
- James D. Cumming, Foreign Guest Professor, published first paper with Cho Zang-hee on MRI Imaging resolution improvement.
- Kyoungchul Kong, Mechanical engineer, entrepreneur and academic
- Heun Lee, identified mechanism behind hydrogen storage in ice particles
- Ji-O Lee, chemist; identified structure of protein causing sepsis
- Sang-yup Lee, developed chip to diagnose Wilson's disease
- Gi-hyong Gho, mathematician; developed world's first public key crypto system (PKCS) technology
- Jong-kyong Jeong, identified cause of Parkinson's disease
- Eunseong Kim, physicist; discovered new evidence for the existence of a supersolid
- Jin-woo Kim, identified the cause behind senile retinal degeneration disease
- Se-jin Kwan, aerospace engineer; successfully developed and tested a moon lander
- Chang Hee Nam, physicist; developed attosecond pulse generation and compression technology
- Gweng-su Rhim, developed next generation Transparent Resistive Random Access Memory (TRRAM)
- Seung-man Yang, developed new photonics crystal-based optofluidic technology
- Yoon-tae Young, physicist; first to observe proper function of complexin protein to control neuron communication
- Giltsu Choi, photobiologist; identified key genes regulating seed germination in response to light in plants.
- Dan Keun Sung, electronic engineer
- Jeong Whan Yoon, mechanical engineer

== Notable alumni ==
=== Academia ===
- Ryong Ryoo, chemist
- Sanghoon Kook, Professor at The University of New South Wales

=== Science and technology ===
- Yi So-Yeon, first Korean to fly in space
- Tony Kim, founder of ProtoPie

=== Business ===
- Sung-kyun Na, co-founder of Neowiz
- Byung-gyu Chang, co-founder of Neowiz and founder of Krafton
- Chang-han Kim, Krafton CEO
- Kim Jung-ju, NEXON CEO
- Hae-jin Lee, Next Human Network (NHN Corporation)

=== Entertainment ===
- So-jung Kim, Singer
- Jang-won Lee, Singer (Peppertones)
- Jae-pyung Shin, Singer (Peppertones)
- So-hee Yoon, Actress
- Sung-bum Heo (Horang), model and influencer

== Notes and references ==
- The Times-QS World University Rankings 2009 - KAIST 69th overall, 21st in the field of Engineering/Technology

== See also ==
- Education in Korea
- List of national universities in South Korea
- List of universities and colleges in South Korea
