= Korea Internet & Security Agency =

South Korea internet organization

Logo of KISA

The Korea Internet & Security Agency (Korean: 한국인터넷진흥원; Hanja: 韓國인터넷振興院, KISA) is the Ministry of Science and ICT's sub-organization dealing with the allocation and maintenance of South Korea's IPv4/IPv6 address space (and the related WHOIS information), Autonomous System Numbers, and the .kr country code top-level domain (ccTLD), and also responsible for the cybersecurity of the Internet within South Korea, and runs the Korea Computer Emergency Response Team Coordination Center, a.k.a. KrCERT/CC, for the private sector of the country.

The organization was created in July 2009, as three different agencies were merged into one organization: the Korea Information Security Agency (KISA), the National Internet Development Agency (NIDA) and the Korean IT International Cooperation Agency (KIICA).

The KrCERT/CC, which is an internal division of KISA, cooperates and interacts locally with the National Cyber Security Center in the National Intelligence Service of Korea. It also interacts with other national CSIRTs and global cybersecurity vendors.

== See also ==
- National Cyber Security Center (South Korea)
- National Cyber Security Centre (disambiguation) in other countries
