= Telecommunications in South Korea =

In South Korea, telecommunications services improved dramatically in the 1980s with the assistance of foreign partners and as a result of the development of the electronics industry. The number of telephones in use in 1987 reached 9.2 million, a considerable increase from 1980, when there were 2.8 million subscribers (which, in turn, was four times the number of subscribers in 1972).

Radio, and in more recent years television, reached virtually every resident. By 1945 there were about 60,000 radio sets in the country. By 1987 there were approximately 42 million radio receivers in use, and more than 100 radio stations were broadcasting. Transistor radios and television sets have made their way to the most remote rural areas. Television sets, now mass-produced in South Korea, became far less expensive; most city people and a significant number of rural families owned or had access to a television. Ownership of television sets grew from 25,000 sets when broadcasting was initiated in 1961 to an estimated 8.6 million sets in 1987, and more than 250 television stations were broadcasting.

== Telephone ==
- Telephones - main lines in use: 26.6 million (2004)
- Telephones - mobile cellular: 58.0 million (2015.7)
- Telephone system:
  - general assessment: excellent domestic and international services
  - domestic: NA
  - international: country code - 82; 10 fiber-optic submarine cables - 1 Korea-Russia-Japan, 1 Korea-Japan-Hong Kong, 3 Korea-Japan-China, 1 Korea-Japan-China-Europe, 1 Korea-Japan-China-US-Taiwan, 1 Korea-Japan-China, 1 Korea-Japan-Hong Kong-Taiwan, 1 Korea-Japan; satellite earth stations - 3 Intelsat (1 Pacific Ocean and 2 Indian Ocean) and 3 Inmarsat (1 Pacific Ocean and 2 Indian Ocean)

=== Mobile phone ===
There are three mobile phone service providers: SK Telecom, KT and LG Uplus.

== Radio ==
- Radio broadcast stations: AM 61, FM 150, shortwave 2 (2005)

== Television ==
- Television broadcast stations: terrestrial stations 43; cable operators 59; relay cable operators 190 (2005). As of 2022, 255 channels are broadcast on B tv basis.

South Korea has seven national terrestrial television networks from four broadcaster; KBS 1TV, KBS 2TV, KBS NEWS D, MBC TV, SBS TV, EBS 1TV, and EBS 2TV. All terrestrial channels are digital (ATSC) since January 2013. KBS NEWS D, a terrestrial MMS channel that opened before and after the 2021 Tokyo Olympics, is the latest broadcasting station to open.

From November 2011, four generalist channel are available on cable television; TV CHOSUN, JTBC, Channel A, and MBN.

== Internet ==
- Internet hosts: 7.4 million
- Internet users: 43.9 million

(Total population: 50 million (July 2012 est.)

- Country code (Top-level domain): KR

=== IT and Broadband Development ===
Today, South Korea has the highest number of broadband users. The rapid growth of the Korean broadband market was the result of a combination of government pushes and market factors. The government was active in promoting privatization and deregulation in general, and the information technology (IT) sector was no exception.

The government implemented structural reforms in July 1990. Since the mid-1990s, the Ministry of Information and Communications (MIC) has pursued a policy of high-speed telecommunication infrastructure as a foundation to build a “knowledge-based society.” In the telecommunications sector, competition was allowed on an incremental basis and, in the market for value added services, full competition was allowed. In March 1995, Korea Information Infrastructure (KII) was established. KII's goal was to advance the nation's IT infrastructure. In August 1995, the Framework Act on Information Promotion was enacted.

The country then experienced economic crisis in 1997 with the rest of the region. During the economic reforms being implemented after the financial crisis, the information technology (IT) sector was one of several that was targeted and considered to be an important factor in the recovery of the nation's economy. In 1999, the government implemented the program known as Cyber Korea 21, which was intended to accelerate IT development.

In 1999, the government provided US$77 million in loans with preferential rates to facilities service providers (FSP). In 2000, another US$77 million was provided in loans for suburban areas, small cities and towns, and regional industrial areas. Another US$926 million was provided until 2005 in order to supply the rural areas with broadband.

Commensurate with its investment funding, the government implemented various policies designed to increase internet use among the general population. The government provided “internet literacy” lessons to homemakers, the elderly, military personnel, and farmers. In June 2000, the government implemented what was known as the “Ten Million People Internet Education” project, the purpose of which was to provide internet education to ten million people.

The number of broadband subscribers in Korea reached 10 million in October 2002, with about 70% out of 14.3 million homes connected at the speed of over 2 Mbit/s.

In 2002, there were six operators providing broadband services in Korea. The market share leader was Korea Telecom (KT), with approximately 45.8% market share (4.5 million subscribers), followed by Hanaro Telecom with approximately 28.6% of the market and Thrunet with approximately 13.1%. of the market. In terms of technology, KT primarily uses Digital Subscriber Line (DSL). Hanaro uses a mix of cable and DSL. Thrunet service is mainly provided through cable modem.

At end of June 2011, subscribers of Voice over Internet Protocol (VoIP) service achieve 10.1 million or around 20 percent of South Korea's population.

On February 27, 2024, Twitch has ended service in Korea due to the double charge of internet usage fee by the 3 Korean mobile service providers.

== See also ==
- Korean telephone numbering plan
- List of South Korean broadcasting networks
- Ministry of Information and Communication
