= International Journal of Plasticity =

Materials science academic journal (1985- )

- Discipline: Plastic deformation
- Language: English
- Edited by: Akhtar S. Khan

Publication details
- History: 1985-present
- Publisher: Elsevier
- Frequency: Monthly
- Open access: Hybrid
- Impact factor: 15.4 (2025)

Standard abbreviations
- ISO 4: Int. J. Plast.

Indexing
- ISSN: 0749-6419 (print); 1879-2154 (web)
- OCLC no.: 57046886

Links
- Journal homepage

The International Journal of Plasticity is a monthly peer-reviewed scientific journal that covers research that relates to micro and macro plastic deformation and fracture for isotropic and anisotropic materials.The journal is published by Elsevier and the editors-in-chief is Akhtar S. Khan (University of Maryland, Baltimore County).

== Abstracting and indexing ==
The journal is abstracted and indexed in:

- Applied Mechanics Reviews
- Cambridge Scientific Abstracts
- Chemical Abstracts Service
- Current Contents/Engineering, Computing & Technology
- EBSCO databases
- EI Compendex Plus
- Engineering Index
- Inspec
- International Aerospace Abstracts
- Materials Science Citation Index
- Metadex
- PASCAL
- ProQuest databases
- Science Citation Index Expanded
- Scopus
- ZbMATH Open

According to the Journal Citation Reports, the journal has a 2025 impact factor of 15.4.

== See also ==
- Fracture mechanics
- Solid mechanics
