= National Computerization Agency =

South Korean statutory government agency

Symbol of National Computerization Agency

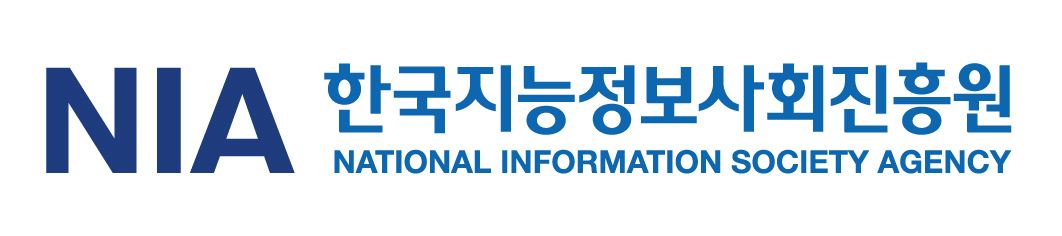
The Symbol after changing the name to the National Information Society Agency

The South Korean National Computerization Agency (NCA) (Korean: 한국 전산원) is a statutory government agency acting as Korea's top IT policy and technical support agency.

== Overview ==
The agency was founded by Article 10 of the Framework Act on Information Promotion for the purpose of promoting computerization and to support development of related policies for Korean national agencies and local governments.

NCA was able to launch an e-Government project to enhance public convenience and improve administrative efficiency.

The name was changed to the National Information Society Agency (NIA) in December 2020, and before that, it was known as the Korea Information Society Development Institute. The title of this article, "National Computerization Agency," was used only until 2006.

It is being prepared for the launch of a Digital Platform Government project similar to the e-Government project implemented by the former National Computerization Agency in the past. It aims to move away from the previous method where each government agency provided services separately, and to create a single platform that enables access to all government data, with the goal of enhancing convenience for the public.

== History ==
1987 Established for the NBIS Project
1995 KII-G Project
1997 Government Information Exchange Center, IT Evaluation
1999 Cyber Korea 21
2000 National Knowledge & Information Resources Management Project
2001 Information Certification Center
2002 e-Korea Vision 2006, NII Back-up Center
2003 Establishment of Korea-Mexico IT Cooperation Center
2004 Establishment of Korea-Chile IT Cooperation Center
2004 Commencement of BcN Project such as Home Network, RFID, etc.

== Organization ==
- Staff 202 Members (as of 2005)
- Budget (FY 2005) of 455 million USD
