= National Education Information System =

- Hangul: 교육행정정보시스템
- Hanja: 教育行政情報시스템
- RR: Gyoyuk haengjeong jeongbo siseutem
- MR: Kyoyuk haengjŏng chŏngbo sisŭt'em

The National Education Information System, or NEIS, is a computer network maintained by South Korea's Ministry of Education. It contains records on every teacher and student in South Korea, and is built on a Linux-style platform.

The implementation of the NEIS in 2003 nearly touched off a nationwide teacher's strike by the Korean Teachers' Union, which continues to advocate passive resistance to the system. The NEIS has been managed by Korea Education and Research Information Service (KERIS) since its opening.

The NEIS website can be accessed only from authorized computers.
