= Ministry of Information and Communication (South Korea) =

1994–2008 South Korean government ministry

- Hangul: 정보통신부
- Hanja: 情報通信部
- RR: Jeongbo tongsinbu
- MR: Chŏngbo t'ongsinbu

The Ministry of Information and Communication or MIC was a ministry of the government of South Korea. Its headquarters are located in Jongno-gu, central Seoul. The last minister was Rho Jun-hyong, who began serving in March 2006. The ministry was dissolved on February 28, 2008 and combined with the former Korean Broadcasting Commission to form the Korea Communications Commission.

== See also ==
- Korea Post
- Government of South Korea
- Communications in South Korea
