= Active Voice Building =

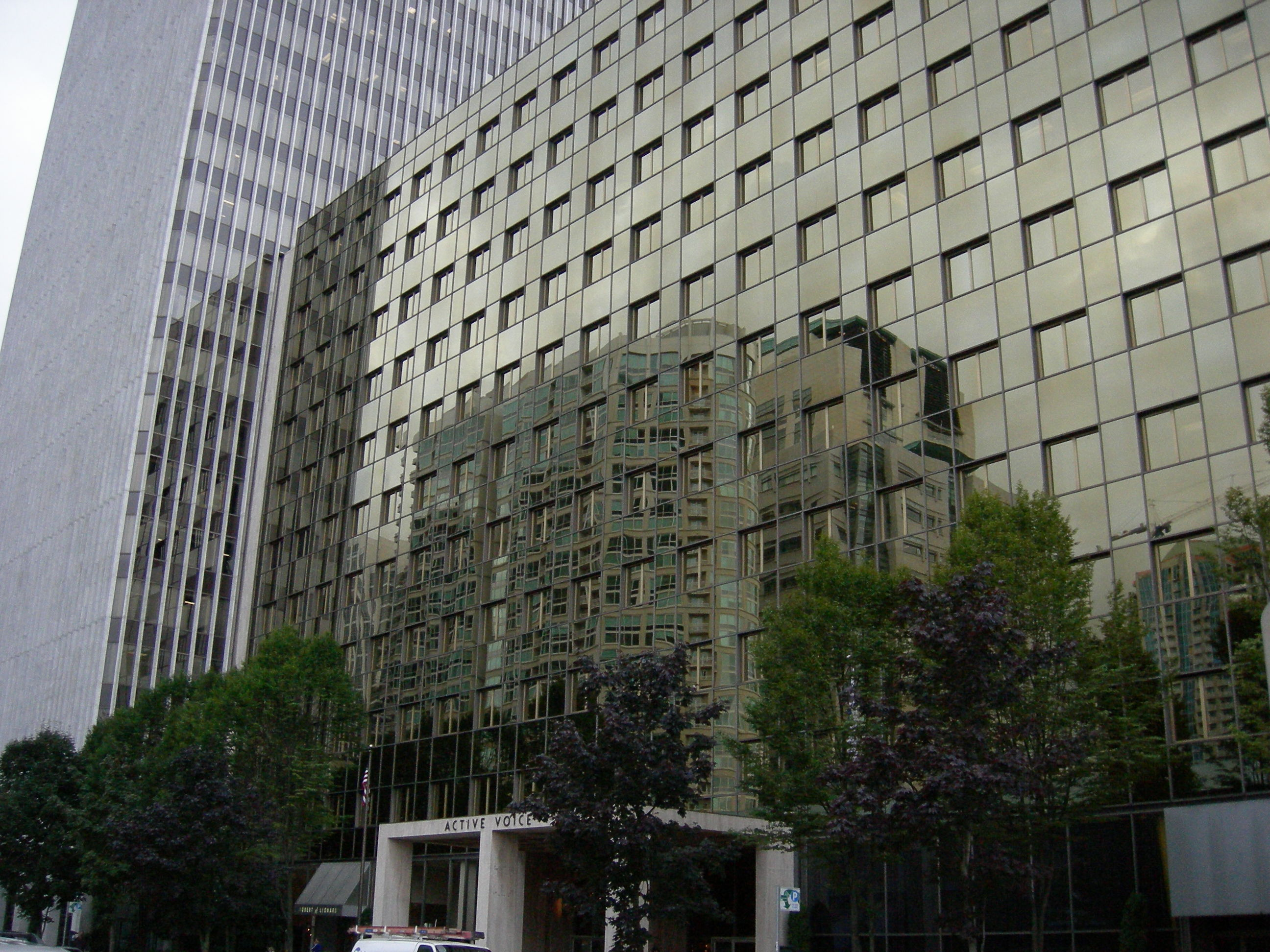

- Location within downtown Seattle
- Former names: United Airlines Building

General information
- Type: Office
- Location: 2033 Sixth Avenue, Seattle, United States
- Coordinates: 47°36′53.07″N 122°20′21.59″W
- Completed: 1962
- Owner: Clise Properties
- Management: Clise Properties

Height
- Roof: 156 feet (48 m)
- Top floor: 11

Technical details
- Floor count: 11
- Floor area: 156,737 square feet (14,561.3 m^{2})
- Lifts/elevators: 4

Design and construction
- Architect: Chester L. Lindsey

The Active Voice Building in Seattle, Washington, is a reinforced concrete and steel-frame office building with solar bronze exterior window panels. It is located on the southwest corner of 6th Avenue and Lenora Street and abuts the Westin Building to the south, providing direct connections to the Westin's meet-me rooms and colocation facilities.

Constructed in 1962, originally for the Internal Revenue Service, the building was named United Airlines Building until 2001. It was renamed "Active Voice Building" in 2005 after Active Voice, LLC, a subsidiary of NEC Unified Solutions, Inc., became the anchor tenant, occupying 42,600 square feet (3,960 m^{2}) of the building on three floors.

The ground floor of the Active Voice is home to a jazz club and a day spa.

In 1975 and again in 2001, the building underwent renovations.
