= One Wilshire =

Telecommunications and interconnection building in Los Angeles, California

Coordinates: 34.0479°N 118.2556°W

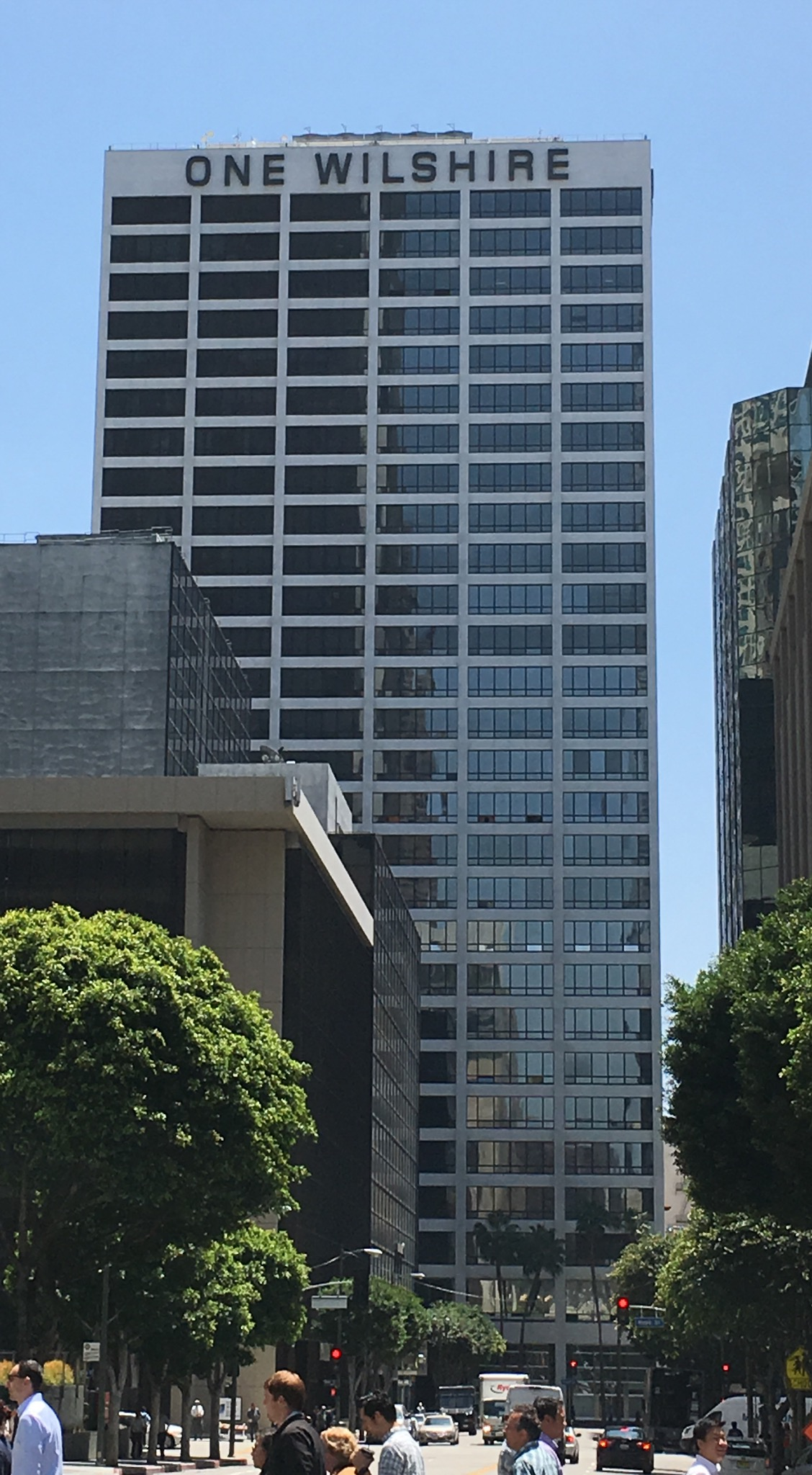

General information
- Location: 624 S. Grand Ave, Los Angeles, California
- Named for: Wilshire Boulevard
- Construction started: 1964
- Opened: 1966
- Renovated: 1992 / 2001
- Owner: GI Partners
- Affiliation: Telecommunications industry

Technical details
- Floor count: 30
- Floor area: 664,000 sq ft (61,700 m^{2})

Design and construction
- Architecture firm: Skidmore, Owings and Merrill
- Developer: S. Jon Kreedman & Company
- Main contractor: Del E. Webb Construction Company
- Known for: Densely populated meet-me-room

One Wilshire is an office building located at the junction of Wilshire Boulevard and South Grand Avenue in downtown Los Angeles, California, United States. Located at the eastern end of Wilshire, its address is 624 S. Grand Avenue. Built in 1966, the thirty-story high-rise was designed by Skidmore, Owings and Merrill, and for its first decades in existence, it was used almost exclusively by law firms. In the early 1990s, it began housing largely telecommunications companies, and in 1992, One Wilshire underwent a major renovation, with the improvements largely related to telecommunication network upgrades. Around this time, a large meet-me room was constructed on the fourth floor, and in 2008, Wired claimed that One Wilshire had "the world's most densely populated Meet-Me room," with around 260 ISPs with interconnected networks.

In 2001, the Carlyle Group bought the building for $119 million, and Hines Real Estate Investment Trust in Houston, Texas, paid $287 million for One Wilshire in 2007. It was sold in 2013 from Hines Real Estate Investment Trust to GI Partners for $437.5 million, the highest price ever paid for an office building in downtown Los Angeles. As of 2013, it was one of the top three telecommunications centers in the world, and by 2015 One Wilshire was "the most highly connected Internet point in the western U.S.," with submarine communications cables allowing "one-third of Internet traffic from the U.S. to Asia [to pass] through the building."

== History ==
=== Construction and first decades (1960s–2006) ===
Ground was broken for One Wilshire in 1964, and the building was completed in 1966 at 624 South Grand Avenue in downtown Los Angeles, on the far eastern end of Wilshire Boulevard. The high-rise was designed by Skidmore, Owings and Merrill and built by Del E. Webb Construction to be a standard office building with thirty floors and 664,000 square feet (61,700 m^{2}) of space. Even though the address of the building is on Grand, the building's name, One Wilshire, was suggested by Morris Pynoos, as vice president of S. Jon Kreedman Co., who saw the building's location as the start of Wilshire from the east and the end of Wilshire from the west. It was selected by developer S. Jon Kreedman, who would later become known for converting The Century Towers in 1977. One Wilshire housed law offices at one point in its first few decades. "Traditional corporate tenants" began moving out in the early 1990s, and the building instead became popular with telecommunications companies, partly because the AT&T Switching Center was only two blocks away.

One Wilshire is located near SBC Communications/Pacbell's central switching station at 400 S. Grand, with its towering, now nearly obsolete, microwave antenna. With deregulation looming in the 1980s, Pacific Bell banned competitors from the central switching station. Thus, long distance carrier MCI mounted its microwave station on the roof of One Wilshire, at the time one of the tallest buildings with good lines of sight downtown. And so began One Wilshire's importance as a telecom site.

— The Center for Land Use Interpretation, 2013

In 1992, One Wilshire underwent a major renovation, largely related to telecommunication network upgrades. Telecommunications companies had "congregated" to One Wilshire by the early 1990s, and by 1998, One Wilshire was a "focal point" for the telecom industry, in part because it had a clear line of sight to the east that helped with microwave transmissions. As the building became a hotspot for telecommunications, the so-called meet-me room was constructed on the fourth floor, which allows the building's tenants to interconnect. In 2001, the Carlyle Group bought the building for $119 million, spending $30 million on infrastructure improvements. As of 2002, the building had five generators for the event of a blackout. Cooling units were primarily on the third floor, as well as on the roof.

=== Sale to Hines Real Estate (2007–2012) ===
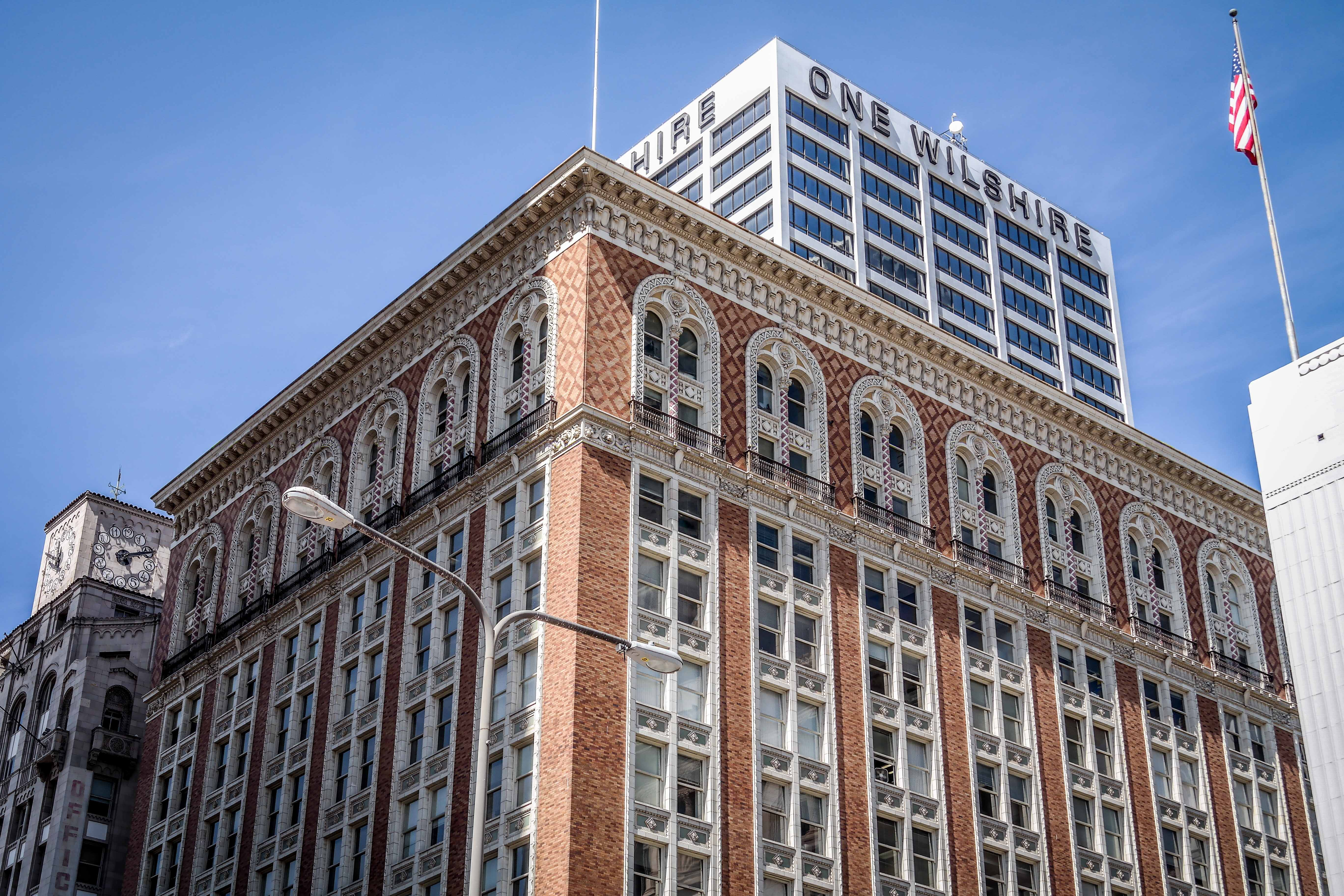
The One Wilshire building (pictured behind the brownstone) is said to be "the main hub of the internet for the entire Pacific Rim," due to the large concentration of telecommunications companies as tenants.

In December 2006, the Hengchun earthquakes in Taiwan severed several critical undersea fiber optic cables in the Pacific. One Wilshire was one of the hubs able to re-route some of the internet and voice traffic from Taiwan through their facility. CRG West of the Carlyle Group managed the property as of 2007, with 23 of the building's floors designed to hold communications infrastructure compared to offices. Around 300 companies had hardware in the building by that time, including Google and carriers from Asia, India, and Europe. Others included Verizon Communications, Savvis, Level 3, Global Crossing, Qwest Communications, Pac-West Telecomm, the Carlyle Group's CRG West subsidiary, and Sprint. Hines Real Estate Investment Trust in Houston, Texas, paid $287 million for One Wilshire in 2007. CRG West remained a tenant after the sale. In 2008, Wired claimed that One Wilshire had "the world's most densely populated Meet-Me room," with around 260 ISPs with interconnected networks. At that point, the building had only four of its thirty floors devoted to law offices.

=== Recent sales and events (2013–present) ===
By 2013, One Wilshire was one of the world's top three telecommunications data centers, along with 60 Hudson Street in New York City and Telehouse in London. As a primary terminus for fiber-optic cable routes between Asia and North America, One Wilshire was also the most important telecommunications hub in the western United States. Hines Real Estate Investment Trust sold the building to GI Partners in July 2013 for $437.5 million in US currency. At a sale price of $660 per square foot, it was the highest price ever paid for an office building in downtown Los Angeles. According to Fortune, as of 2015, the building is "the most highly connected Internet point in the western U.S.," with undersea cables allowing "one-third of Internet traffic from the U.S. to Asia [to pass] through the building." After the elevators had been removed, two elevator shafts were converted to hold water pipes used in the extensive cooling systems.

== Ownership timeline ==
Date	Seller	Buyer	Cost
1960s	Original land owners	S. Jon Kreedman & Company	Unknown
2001	S. Jon Kreedman & Company	Carlyle Group	US$119 million
2007	Carlyle Group	Hines Real Estate Investment Trust	US$287 million
2013	Hines Real Estate	GI Partners	US$437.5 million

== Tenants ==
Initially, One Wilshire leased office space to law firms, though in the 1990s most of its tenants became telecommunications companies. Google was a tenant by 2007, and Wilcon expanded its presence in 2013 after it acquired IX2, which at the time was based in One Wilshire and one of the first colocation tenants in the building, dating back to 1998. Among One Wilshire's other major tenants that year were Verizon Communications, Sirius XM Radio, and China Telecom, with about a third of One Wilshire used as standard office space for firms such as Musick Peeler and Crowell, Weedon & Co. As of 2015, the building had over 300 tenants. Its largest tenant continues to be CoreSite Realty Corporation, a data center provider which established an office in One Wilshire upon its founding in 2001. As of 2015, Fiber Internet Center is a tenant, and American Internet Services also maintains a point of presence (OWPOP) at One Wilshire. Others include AT&T, Amazon Web Services, and Netflix. East West Bank also has a branch at the main entrance, facing Grand Ave.

== See also ==
- List of notable meet-me rooms
- List of buildings
- Los Angeles skyline
