= Roebling Building =

Historic building in Manhattan, New York

Coordinates: 40°43′21″N 74°00′30″W

The Roebling Building is an industrial structure at 169 Hudson Street in the Tribeca neighborhood of Manhattan in New York City. Dating to the late 19th or early 20th century, it was named after the John A. Roebling family, known for their work in wire rope manufacturing, most notably used in the construction of the Brooklyn Bridge. The building originally served as a warehouse and manufacturing facility for John A. Roebling's Sons Company, contributing to New York City’s industrial economy during its period of rapid growth.

== Architecture ==
The building is characterized by its brick façade and arched windows, reflecting architectural styles common to industrial buildings of the era. Its design combines functional details with subtle decorative elements characteristic of the period. Constructed primarily from masonry, the building features a brick façade. The building's design includes materials such as brick, cast iron, and timber, materials that not only ensured durability and strength but also added an industrial aesthetic. It includes large industrial-style windows that illuminate interior spaces. These windows emphasize the verticality of the structure.

Cast-iron detailing is incorporated throughout the building, reflecting common material choices of the era for both structural and decorative purposes. The interior features open floor plans, originally intended to accommodate manufacturing operations, along with timber beams and columns that remain visible. High ceilings were included to house large machinery and equipment during its industrial use.

== History ==
=== Development ===
The Roebling Building was constructed in the early 20th century and commissioned by the Roebling family, who specialized in wire and cable manufacturing. They decided to establish a dedicated space for their operations. Completed in the mid-1910s, the Roebling Building became one of several industrial structures in Tribeca.

=== Later uses ===
The Roebling Building was constructed as a manufacturing facility. As the neighborhood transitioned from its industrial past to an area frequented by artists and, subsequently, to a sought-after residential and commercial district, the Roebling Building remained an important part of this evolution. In the 1970s, it became attractive to artists looking for affordable studio space.

The Roebling Building housed notable tenants including artists, designers, and entrepreneurs. The building features loft-style spaces with large rooms and ample natural light, which attracted fashion designers who utilized the space for both inspiration and as showrooms. The Roebling Building's legacy includes its architectural features and its cultural influence on Tribeca.

=== Renovations ===
The Roebling Building has undergone renovations to preserve its historic architectural features while adapting to modern requirements. The renovation focused on maintaining original elements, including the cast-iron façade and masonry. Engineers and architects worked on restoring these features, either preserving or accurately replicating them. The renovations also included updating building's infrastructure to meet modern energy efficiency and safety standards. New HVAC systems and improved insulation were installed as part of this modernization.

Elevators were added to make the building accessible. Sustainable materials and techniques were used to reduce the building's environmental impact. The building was converted into a mixed-use property with 12 condominium apartments and ground-level retail in 2000.
