= 60 Hudson Street =

Telecommunications building in Manhattan, New York

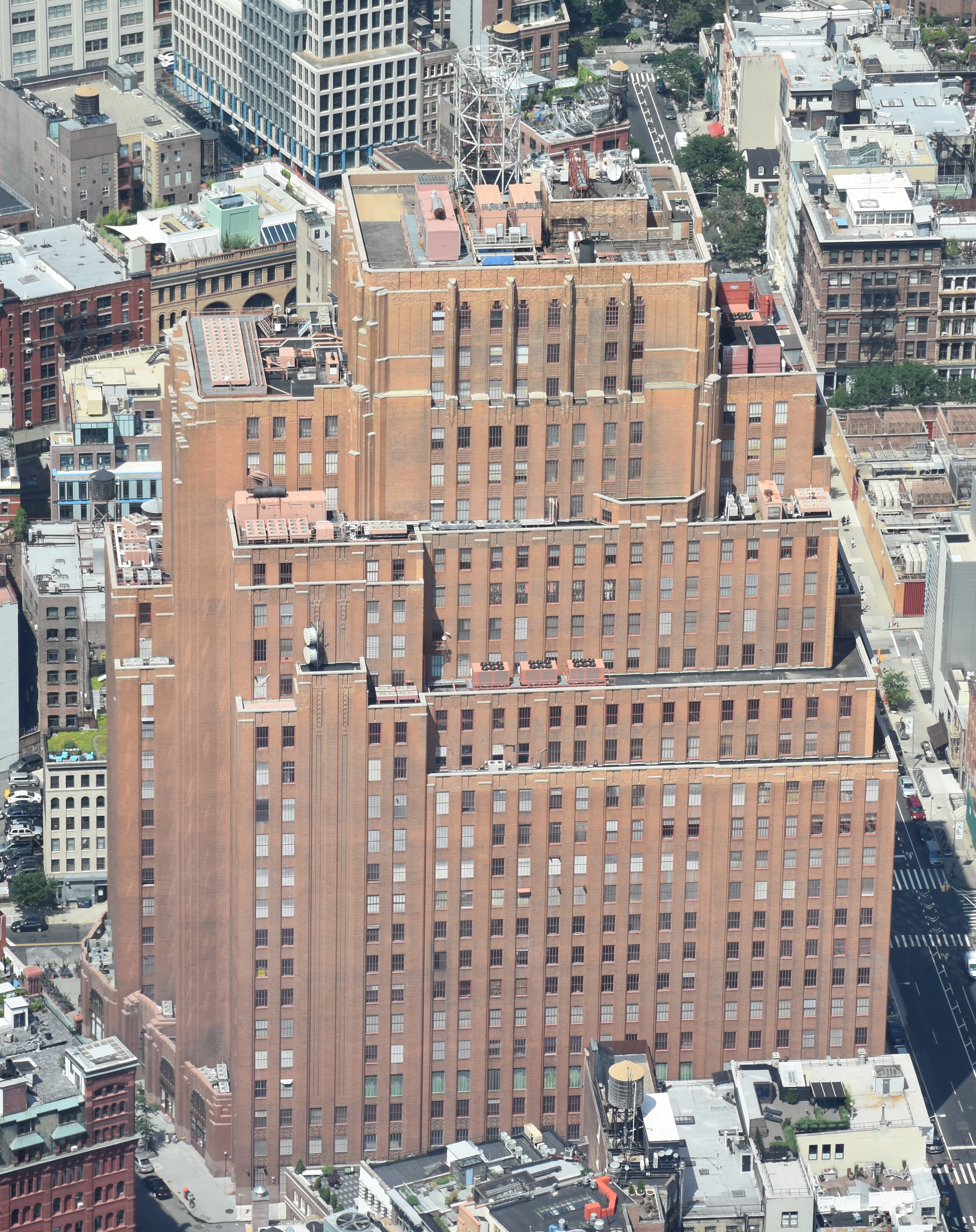
- Seen from One World Observatory
- Former names: Western Union Building

General information
- Location: 60 Hudson Street; Manhattan, New York
- Coordinates: 40°43′04″N 74°00′30″W
- Construction started: 1928
- Completed: 1930

Height
- Height: 371 feet (113 m)

Technical details
- Floor count: 24

Design and construction
- Architect: Ralph Thomas Walker
- Architecture firm: Voorhees, Gmelin and Walker

New York City Landmark
- Designated: October 1, 1991
- Reference no.: 1749 (exterior); 1750 (interior)

60 Hudson Street, formerly known as the Western Union Building, is a 24-story telecommunications building in the Tribeca neighborhood of Manhattan in New York City. Built in 1928–1930, it was one of several Art Deco-style buildings designed by Ralph Thomas Walker of Voorhees, Gmelin and Walker for telecommunications in the early 20th century. 60 Hudson Street spans the entire block between Hudson Street, Thomas Street, Worth Street, and West Broadway.

60 Hudson Street is 371 feet (113 m) tall. Its design shows the influence of Dutch and German Expressionism, with Art Deco detailing. The building's shape features asymmetrical massing and numerous setbacks. The brick facade uses a gradient color scheme with nineteen distinct hues, moving from darker shades to lighter ones as the building rises, and several ornate entrances at ground level lead to a barrel-vaulted brick lobby.

60 Hudson Street was initially the headquarters of Western Union, and its construction was commissioned by Western Union president Newcomb Carlton. The building was described as the world's largest telegraph building upon its opening and served as the combined headquarters for all of Western Union's divisions, which were scattered across New York City prior to the building's completion. Though Western Union relocated elsewhere in 1973, its former headquarters remain a communications center, and since the late 20th century, has housed a colocation center, making it one of the most important Internet hubs in the world. The exterior and lobby were designated as official New York City landmarks in 1991.

== Architecture ==
60 Hudson Street is 371 feet (113 m) tall and contains 24 stories. It occupies a trapezoidal plot measuring 193 feet (59 m) on Hudson Street to the west, 180 feet (55 m) on West Broadway to the east, 254 feet (77 m) on Thomas Street to the south, and 329 feet (100 m) on Worth Street to the north. The Worth and Thomas Street elevations are parallel to each other and perpendicular to the West Broadway elevation. The Hudson Street elevation runs diagonally, intersecting both Worth and Thomas Streets.

The building was designed by Ralph Walker of Voorhees, Gmelin and Walker in the Art Deco style. 60 Hudson Street was the third Art Deco building in the New York City area that Walker designed, after the Barclay–Vesey Building (1927) and New Jersey Bell Headquarters Building (1929); it was followed by 101 Willoughby Street and 1 Wall Street (1931) and 32 Avenue of the Americas (1932), as well as telephone buildings in Upstate New York. Within the New York City area, McKenzie, Voorhees & Gmelin designed numerous other buildings for AT&T or its affiliates during the same time span. (Note: Though Western Union was once an AT&T affiliate, this was not the case by the time 60 Hudson Street was built.) 60 Hudson Street was one of several technologically advanced headquarters erected in the mid-20th century for communications and utility companies in the U.S. Unlike the AT&T buildings, 60 Hudson Street lacks a unified iconography in its ornamentation.

=== Form ===
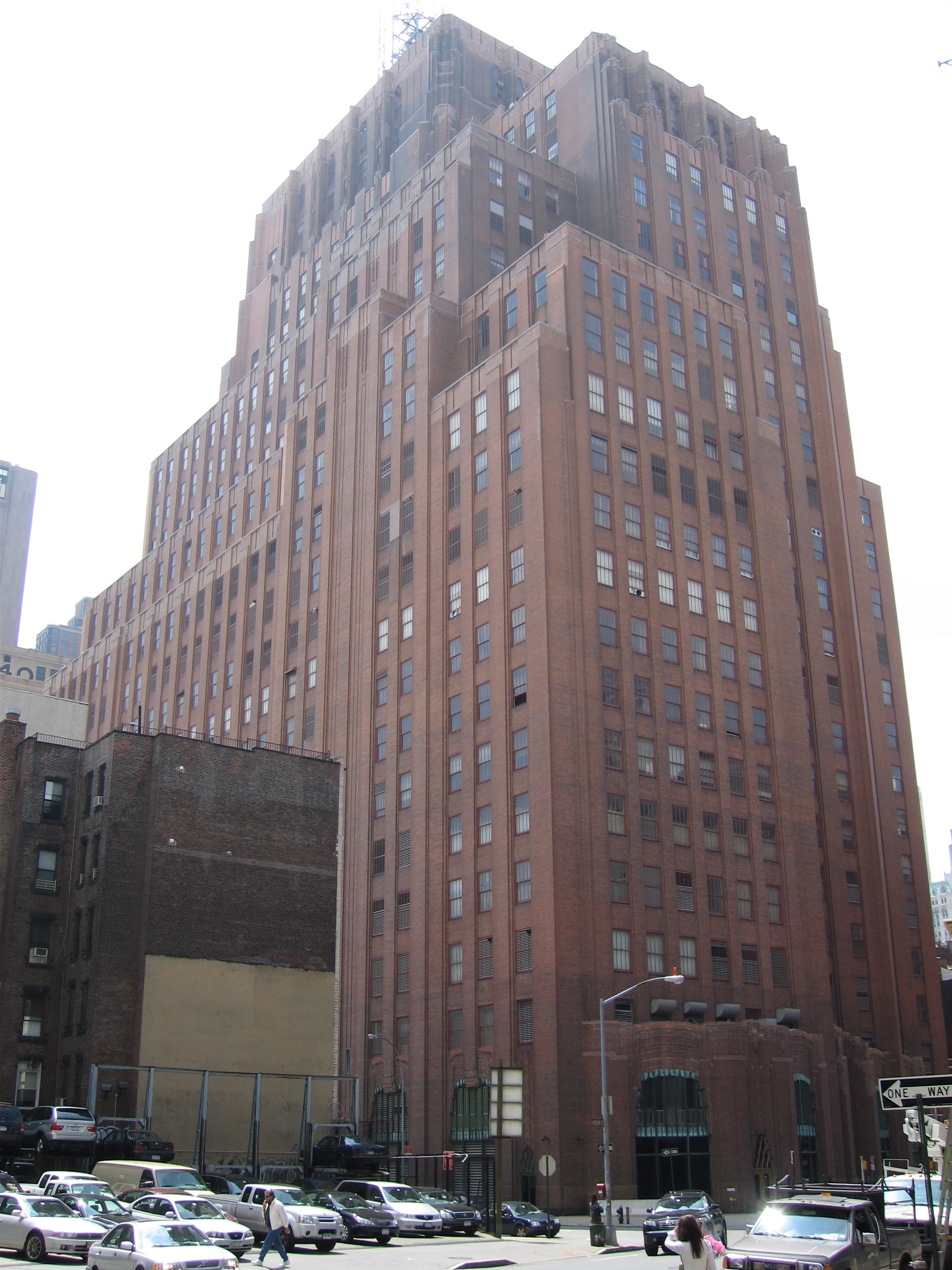
Viewed from the northwest corner, near Hudson and Worth Streets

The massing of 60 Hudson Street includes numerous setbacks. Though setbacks in New York City skyscrapers were mandated by the 1916 Zoning Resolution in order to allow light and air to reach the streets below, they later became a defining feature of the Art Deco style. 60 Hudson Street's massing mostly uses rectangular shapes in spite of its trapezoid-shaped lot. This may have been a response to architecture critic Lewis Mumford's previous criticism of the Barclay–Vesey Building's transition from a parallelogram shaped base to a right-angled tower, which he regarded as an "annoying defect". Walker subsequently wrote that Mumford's criticism made him realize "a building could take its own form regardless of the land below". Accordingly, Walker designed 60 Hudson Street as an intricate set of interlocking slabs.

On the Hudson Street elevation is a two-story screen, behind which rise three rectangular slabs. The northern, center, and southern slabs are respectively 15, 21, and 19 stories tall. By contrast, the West Broadway elevation, which is perpendicular to both Thomas and Worth Streets, is symmetrical, with the top floors behind a central slab. Along the outer sections of the West Broadway elevation, the setbacks are at the 13th, 15th, 19th, and 22nd stories; the center section contains projecting dormers that rise an additional story above the previous setback, except at the 22nd floor. The series of setbacks on Thomas and Worth Streets are largely symmetrical, and are continuations of the setbacks on the outer edges of the West Broadway elevation. There are several projecting dormers along the setbacks near the western (Hudson Street) ends of both elevations.

60 Hudson Street's form was also influenced by its interior use, as it was a "hybrid building" that contained offices along with mechanical equipment. There were numerous functions that did not necessitate sunlight and could operate using artificial light, such as the central operating system and the mechanical space, which was placed inside the building's core. The office space, conversely, was placed on the exterior walls, so 60 Hudson Street did not require light courts that were as extensive as in nearby buildings.

=== Facade ===
A brick facade was used for 60 Hudson Street and for Walker's other communications buildings, since he preferred the material for its texture and its flexibility in color combinations. The brick ornamentation on the facade was concentrated around the base, as well as on the parapets on each setback (which were largely removed by the 1990s). The use of brick was likely influenced by Dutch and German Expressionism, as well as Walker's preference for "unity and harmony", his dislike of terracotta-on-brick ornamentation, and his observation that stone could change color within a short time. The brick was made by the Continental Clay Products Company of Fallston, Pennsylvania, which also made the facade for the David Stott Building in Detroit, Michigan. Walker also designed the facade with a grid of accented vertical piers, contrasting with horizontal spandrels. This emphasized the vertical lines of the building and, when combined with the setbacks, created an appearance of cascades.

The bricks were tinted in various tones of red, arranged in a gradient, inspired by Louis Sullivan's use of "tapestry brick" in different hues. 60 Hudson Street was one of the first structures to use bricks in this manner. According to Walker, this was inspired by Western Union's inclination toward using a distinctive design for the building. There are 19 shades of brick used in the building. Each shade was created by baking the bricks in a kiln run under varying circumstances. The darkest bricks were used in the base, and the bricks on upper stories contained progressively lighter hues; the colors of the bricks changed every 29 feet (8.8 m). To create contrasts in the facade, the base also contained some light bricks and the upper stories also had some dark bricks. Though the facade mostly used brick in red and yellow hues, there were also bricks in very dark blue and purple hues.

==== Base ====
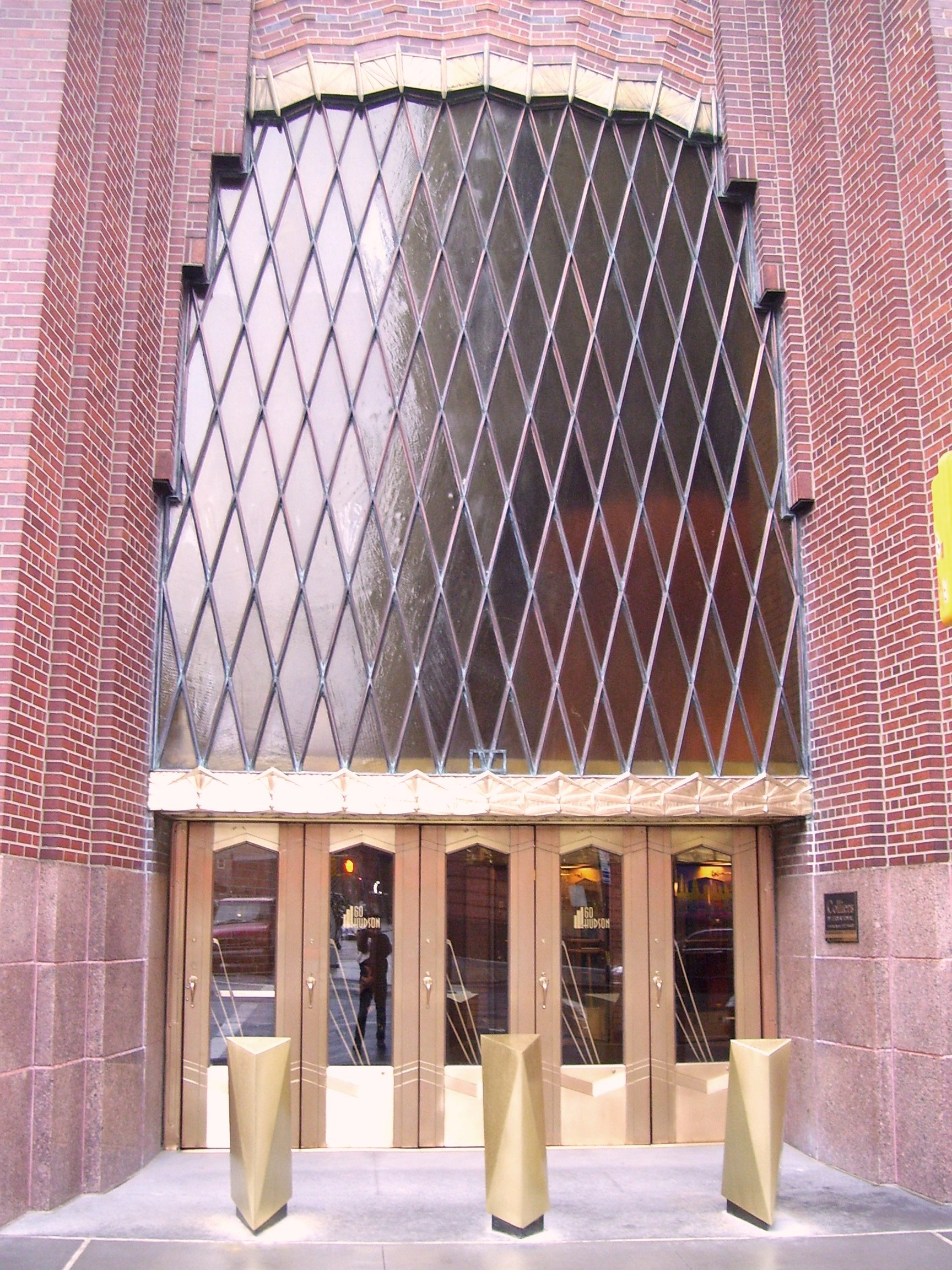
Main entrance, showing the bronze doors beneath the bronze lintel. At the top is a glazed window with diagonal muntins.

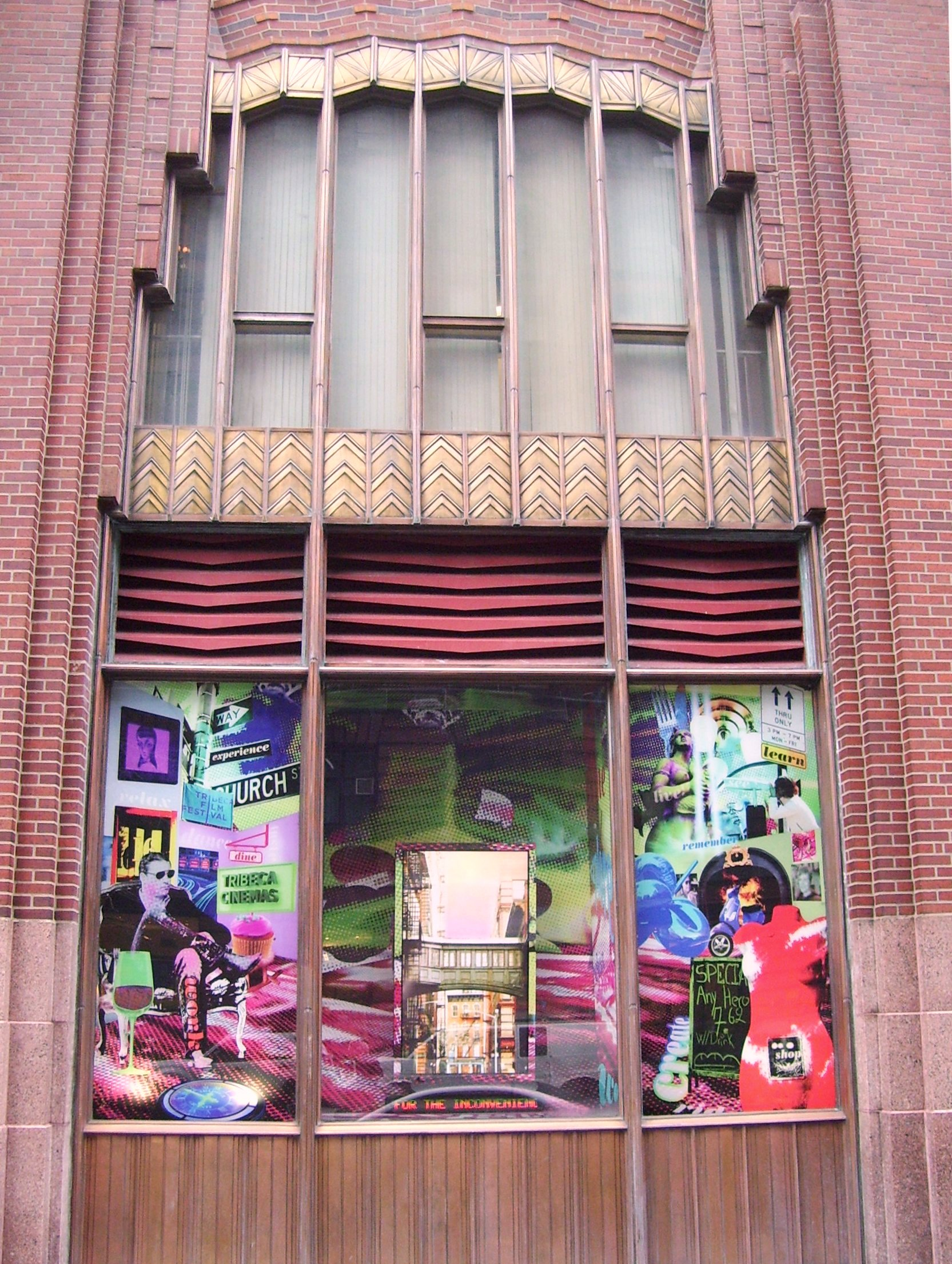
A storefront with a "curtain"-shaped opening on the second floor

The base comprises the first two stories. The lowest section of the facade is composed of three courses of pink granite, while the brick facade rises above that. Around the doors and windows, the brickwork is arranged similarly to curtains. The base is also divided vertically by stepped brick piers. Most ornamentation is made of brick, though the friezes, window frames, and doorways are made of bronze.

On the Hudson Street elevation, the facade forms a two-story "screen", behind which rise the upper stories. The main entrance archway is in the center of this "screen", near the intersection with Jay Street. It consists of five bronze doors beneath a bronze lintel, as well as a glazed window above the doors, which is subdivided by diagonal muntins. The other archways on Hudson Street include storefronts on the ground level, and curtain-shaped windows with vertical muntins on the second story. A smaller doorway faces the corner of Hudson and Worth Streets, on the northwest side of the plot.

The West Broadway elevation is designed similarly to the "screen" on the Hudson Street elevation. There is a centrally positioned entrance with five doors, a bronze lintel, and a glazed window with diagonal muntins. Three storefronts are on either side of the doorway on West Broadway; at the second story, two of these storefronts contain curtain-shaped windows, and the third contains a pair of sash windows set between vertical brick piers. On the Worth Street elevation, there are storefront windows at either end. The central section of the Worth Street elevation contains triple-hung windows, which concealed an auditorium inside. On Thomas Street, there are two storefront windows on the easternmost bays, as well as two double-height loading docks. The remaining bays on Thomas Street contain rectangular windows or ventilation grates, which are set between brick piers.

==== Upper stories ====
The rest of 60 Hudson Street's facade is mostly consistent in design. On Hudson Street, Walker designed the facade with a pattern of wide and narrow piers that alternate. On the other elevations, the piers were largely flat against the rest of the facade, except behind the setbacks at the upper levels, where the piers were more prominent and designed similar to buttresses. At several locations on the north and south elevations, there were windowless bays that concealed stairways behind them. On the Worth Street elevation, the center window openings on the third floor are filled with copper chevron-shaped louvers.

=== Interior ===
When he designed the Barclay-Vesey Building, Walker had believed that it should serve "as a machine which had definite functions to perform for the benefit of its occupants." In a similar manner, 60 Hudson Street was described as "housing the production of the service which this company renders". As with his previous commissions, Walker designed the interior in a similar style to the exterior, at a time when many buildings were being designed with modern-styled exteriors and historically-styled interiors. In contrast to the complex stone designs of his previous commissions, the ornamental program at 60 Hudson Street is more subdued and exclusively uses brick. The interior spaces of 60 Hudson Street cover almost 1 million square feet (93,000 m^{2}). When it was built, the structure had a gross floor area of 1,040,478 square feet (96,663.6 m^{2}) and a usable floor area of 729,035 square feet (67,729.6 m^{2}).

==== Lobby ====
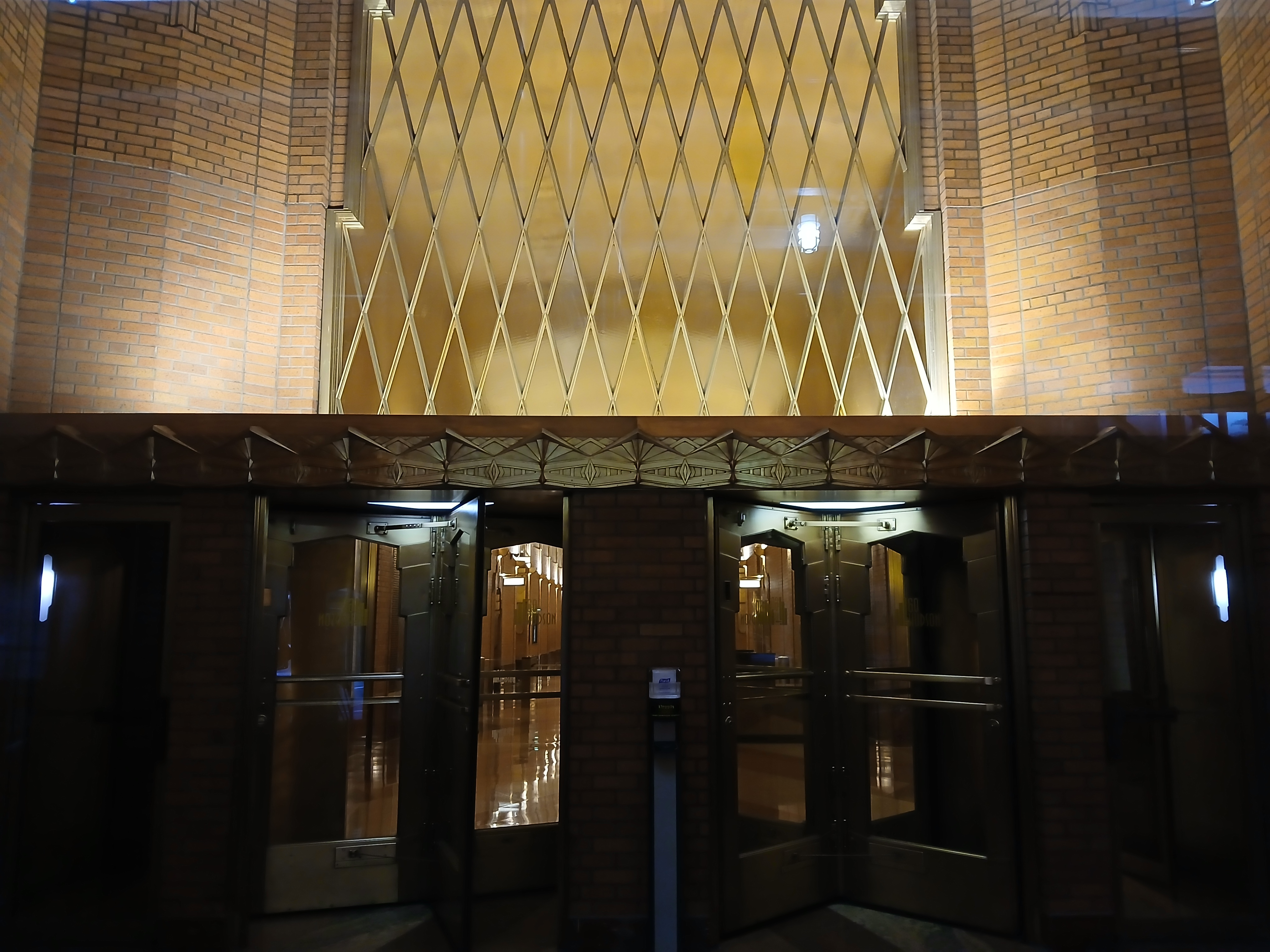
Entrance vestibule on West Broadway

The lobby, a 25-foot-wide (7.6 m) west–east corridor between Hudson Street and West Broadway, is usually not accessible to the public. The corridor contains a barrel-vaulted brick ceiling. Extending off this corridor are two elevator banks, one on each side, as well as numerous additional doorways to service areas, stairwells, and the storefronts at each of the building's four corners. Also on the south side is a telephone alcove; an entrance to the lobby outside the building's former auditorium; and a passageway to the former cafeteria, Small vestibules separate the main corridor from Hudson Street and West Broadway. On Hudson Street, between the vestibule and the main hall, is a wide entrance hall. This space contains plaster on the upper portions of its walls, as well as an arched ceiling supported by octagonal brick piers.

Unlike most other Art Deco lobbies of the time, which incorporated traditional motifs with modern materials, 60 Hudson Street's lobby largely uses a modern brick design. Three shades of brick were used in the lobby. The lobby is clad largely in brick and tile, though the floors are made of terrazzo tile and the bottoms of the walls are clad with red granite. A Western Union publication described the lobby as the "only all-brick corridor in any office building in America". Many elements of the facade were also used in the lobby, such as the brick reliefs and chevrons; curtain-shaped thresholds and doorways; use of bronze trim; and the mailboxes and doors, which are designed in a style reminiscent of the exterior setbacks. The use of interior brick is inspired not only by Sullivan's "brick tapestries" but also by designs of brick halls created by Peter Behrens, Barry Byrne, and Peder Vilhelm Jensen-Klint.

The tops of the walls contain curved covings, giving the appearance that the walls and ceilings have been blended. The lobby contains bronze and brick furnishings such as lampposts and signage. The lobby is illuminated almost entirely by sconces that provide indirect light.

==== Other interior spaces ====
Next to the lobby, on the corner of Hudson and Thomas Streets, was a cafeteria that could serve 5,000 workers per day. The second floor contained a gymnasium, a library, and a school for the education of messengers.

Upon the building's completion, Western Union's operating departments and supporting staff occupied 17 floors. The upper floors contained mechanical shops, offices, and equipment rooms. The ninth floor included laboratories for the company, and the 24th floor served as a "presidential suite". The eleventh through fifteenth floors were devoted to facilities for Western Union's different modes of communication: simplex printers, multiplex transmitters, marine and stock ticker tapes, Morse code equipment, and telephone equipment. Four additional floors were set aside for the possible future expansion of these facilities. This reinforced 60 Hudson Street's role as "the heart of a nerve system of wires and cables reaching to every corner of the nation and the world."

The building featured 70 million feet (21,000,000 m) of cable and 30 miles (48 km) of conduits, as well as a power plant. Pneumatic tubes led from 60 Hudson Street to twenty-five branch offices in Lower and Midtown Manhattan, allowing for the easy transport of pneumatic tube mail in the city. Some of these tubes were later repurposed to hold cables for the Internet companies that occupied the building.

== History ==
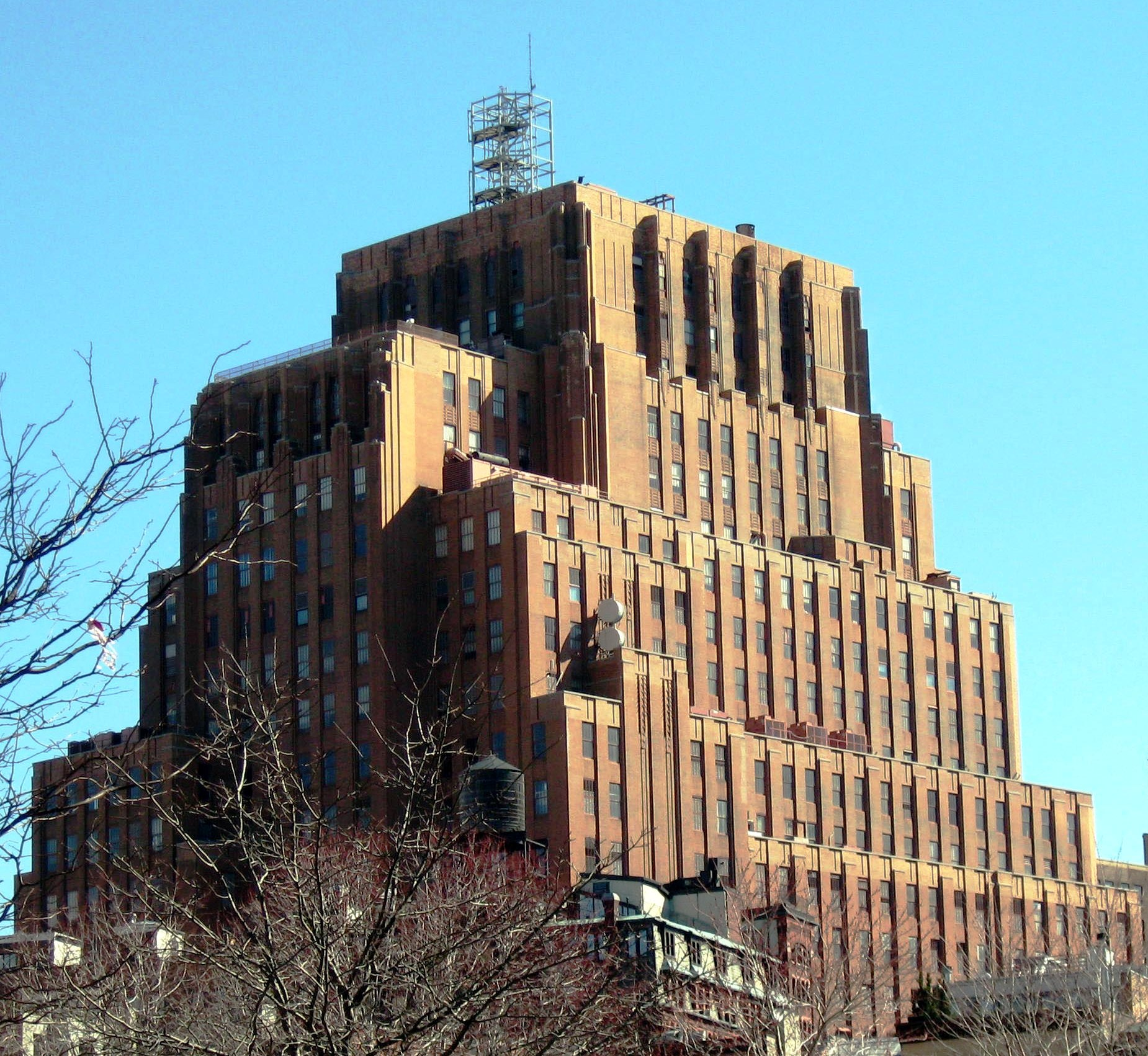
Upper stories, seen from a few blocks away

Western Union, founded in 1851, became a major provider of telegraph services in the late 19th century. In 1875, it built the Western Union Telegraph Building at 195 Broadway between Dey Street and Fulton Street. Western Union was acquired by AT&T in 1909, and the next year, AT&T revealed plans to improve Western Union's offices "for the accommodation of the public and the welfare" of workers. William W. Bosworth was commissioned to design new headquarters on the same site, the present 195 Broadway, which was completed in 1916. The newer Broadway building came to be mainly associated with AT&T, to the extent that by the 1920s, Western Union did not have a building with which its headquarters was mainly associated. Simultaneously, work proceeded on 24 Walker Street, a shared-operations building erected five blocks north on the current 32 Avenue of the Americas site in 1911–1914.

AT&T, under indictment of the Sherman Act, sold its shares in Western Union in 1913 due to the threat of antitrust action. Under the tenure of Western Union president Newcomb Carlton, the company's operations grew and its equipment was upgraded to modern standards.

=== Development ===
Western Union began land acquisition in September 1924, when the firm bought two seven-story buildings on Hudson Street (one occupied by grocer R. C. Williams & Company), a four-story stable, and a one-story building on Thomas Street. Western Union agreed to lease back R. C. Williams & Company's building to that company for five years. The site was close to 24 Walker Street, as well as the company's major clients in Lower Manhattan: the American Stock Exchange at their Trinity Place building, the New York Cotton Exchange, the New York Produce Exchange, and the ticker service on Wall Street. That November, Western Union acquired three more buildings, thereby obtaining about 75 percent of the land on the city block bounded by West Broadway and Worth, Hudson, and Thomas Streets. Western Union hired intermediaries to negotiate for the remainder of the block so existing property owners would not become suspicious.

Western Union bought two additional five-story buildings at 160 and 166 West Broadway in January 1927, thereby securing much of the block. At this time, the company indicated that it would probably erect a structure of up to 36 stories on the block. Western Union acquired the final site on the block in July 1927. Newcomb Carlton, president of Western Union, announced on October 4, 1927, that the company had completed plans for a 15-story edifice on the block, which he said would be the world's largest telegraph building. Carlton estimated that the structure would cost between $6 million and $6.5 million excluding the site. In May 1928, Western Union filed construction plans for the Hudson Street site.

Work started on August 21, 1928, at which point the building was to rise 24 stories. At the time of the site's official groundbreaking, the building was expected to be completed in January 1930. The Western Union Building's completion was predicted to raise land values along Worth Street. Excavations started the following month.; according to The Wall Street Journal, the building was the first project in New York City where the excavation used a "well-point system of drainage". Construction was to take two years because of the complexities of the project: the building was required to be fireproof and resistant to theft and outside interference, while the cable and conduit systems were supposed to handle 100 million messages yearly. During the building's construction, in April 1929, four workers died after a derrick on the 22nd floor collapsed.

=== Western Union years ===
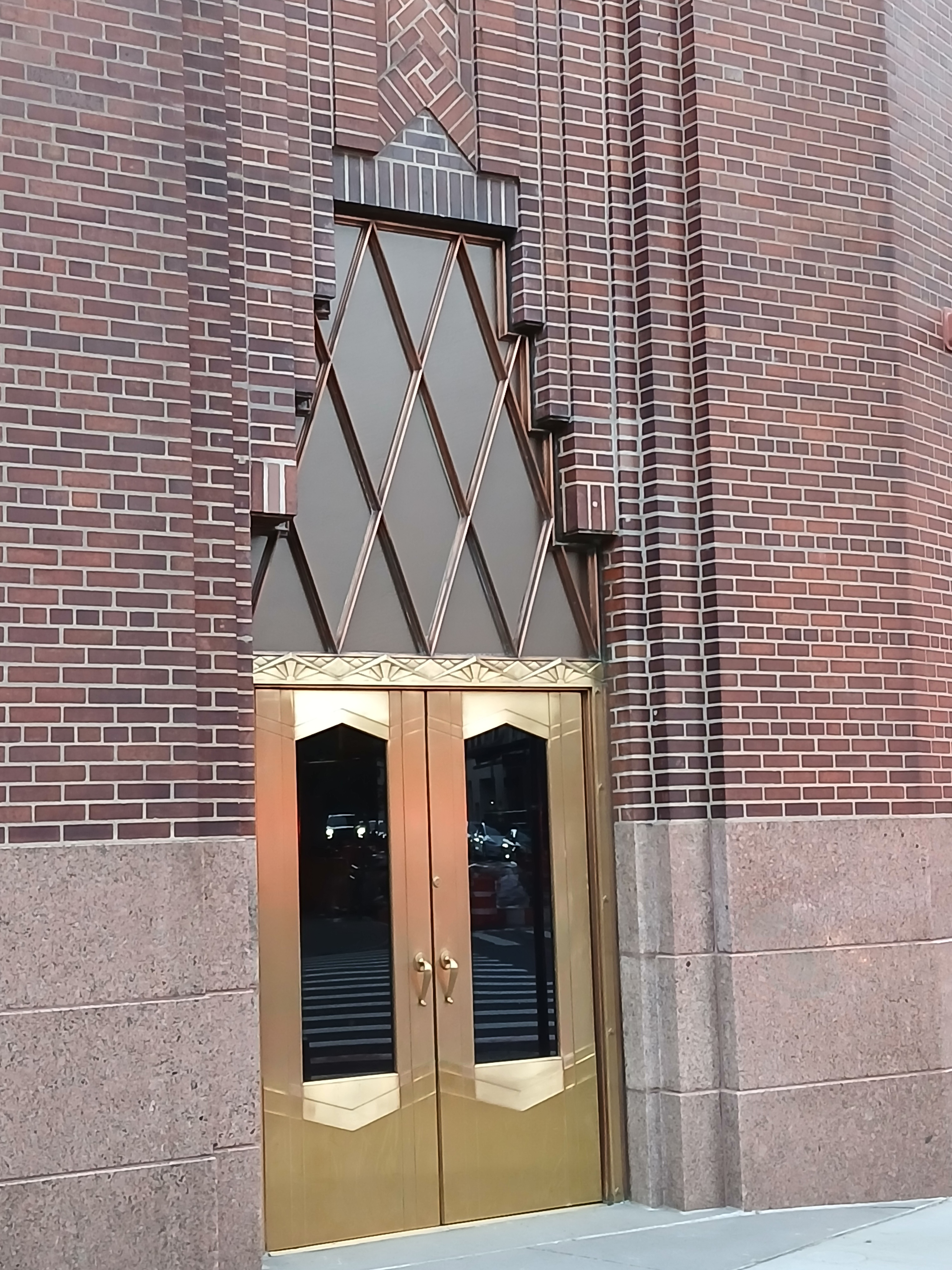
Door at the corner of Hudson and Worth Streets

Western Union started moving from 195 Broadway on August 29, 1930. At the time, Western Union did not occupy the entire structure; the first floor and mezzanine on Hudson Street were rented out to other companies, as were the fourth to seventh floors. Eventually, the company was expected to occupy the entire building, except for two storefronts at the ground story. On October 5, 1930, the telegraph lines from 24 Walker Street were "cut over" to 60 Hudson Street, with the help of 3,000 men. Telegraph service was maintained throughout the twelve-hour "cut over" period; this was considered a large engineering achievement for the time. The first transcontinental telegraph wire from the building was activated two days later. Just before the building's opening, Carlton protested against plans to demolish the adjacent Sixth Avenue elevated railroad in preparation for the construction of nearby subway lines, stating that it would inconvenience Western Union employees; the line remained open until 1938.

The Western Union Building was a premier nexus of worldwide communications during the heyday of the telegraph and was called the "Telegraph Capitol of America". When 60 Hudson Street was Western Union's headquarters, equipment for communications was installed on the roof. The equipment was frequently updated to use the most modern technology, making the building desirable to communications companies. In 1948, Western Union sold 60 Hudson Street to a Chicago-based company for $12.5 million, leasing back the structure. The proceeds from the sale would be used to pay back long-term debt and pay for modernization of the company's equipment. By late 1971, Western Union had indicated its intention to move corporate offices to New Jersey, although it would retain nearly 3,000 workers at 60 Hudson Street. Western Union moved its headquarters to Upper Saddle River, New Jersey, in 1973 and continued to occupy much of 60 Hudson Street.

Western Union sold its leasehold of the building to 60 Hudson Associates in September 1981 for an estimated $24 million. At the time, The New York Times said the building was one of five in Lower Manhattan where at least 50,000 square feet (4,600 m^{2}) of continuous vacant space could be rented immediately. Western Union remained in the building until 1983, when a second sublease was made. Afterward, Western Union gradually moved out of its space. The structure began attracting companies who needed space for their back office departments. 60 Hudson Street remained a major telecommunications hub, as the wires of six long-distance communications providers converged under the building.

=== Internet hub and offices ===
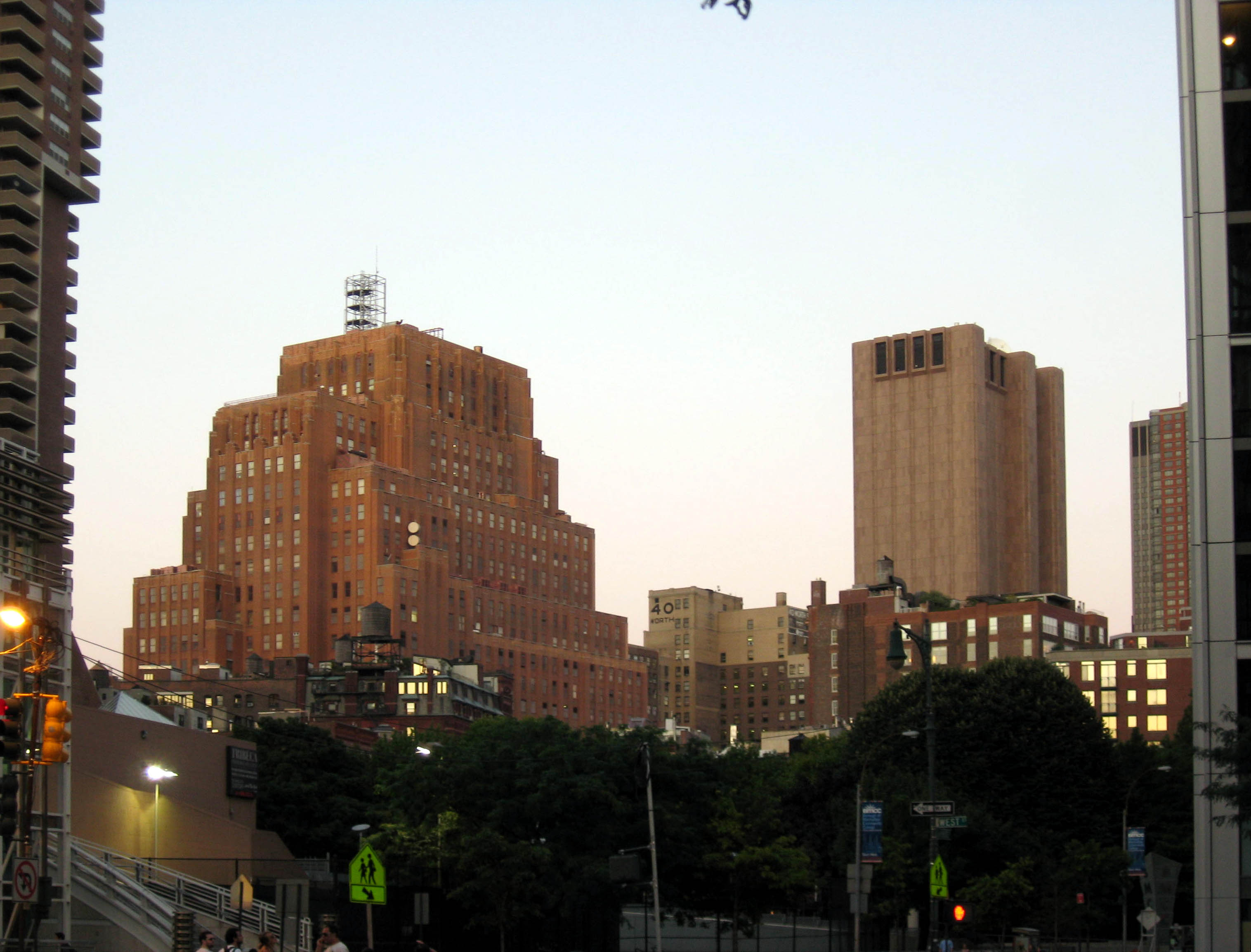
60 Hudson Street (left); 33 Thomas Street, also known as the AT&T Long Lines Building, is at right

After Western Union left, 60 Hudson Street was converted into a colocation center and grew into one of the most important internet hubs in the world. Hundreds of telecommunications companies interconnect their respective internet networks (known as peering) as well as conventional TDM traffic through numerous meet-me rooms and optical and electrical lines placed throughout the building. Many data center colocation providers are tenants in the building. Epsilon Telecommunications, one such company, has built optical and electrical cabling facilities throughout the building since 1997. Various data centers including Epsilon, Digital Realty, and DataBank house internet and telecommunications providers for the purpose of collocating high capacity transport equipment used to terminate traffic both inbound and outbound with each other. By the late 1990s, the building was nearly fully occupied.

The exteriors and ground-floor lobbies of 60 Hudson Street and two other telecommunications buildings were designated city landmarks by the New York City Landmarks Preservation Commission in 1991. (Note: The other buildings were the Barclay–Vesey Building at 140 West Street and the AT&T Long Distance Building at 32 Avenue of the Americas five blocks north.) After Western Union moved out of 60 Hudson Street, some of the space was occupied by city and state agencies. These included the New York City Department of Buildings, which had an office there by the late 1980s, and the New York City Department of Correction, which moved there in 2002. The city's departments of buildings and correction left 60 Hudson Street in 2010, and the space was subsequently used by internet providers.

There has been some controversy about the usage of 60 Hudson Street as a colocation building. Residents of the surrounding neighborhood complained in 1999 that the cooling structures on the building were too loud. 60 Hudson Street's then-owners, Hudson Telegraph Associates, agreed to mitigate noise coming from the building. In 2006, a New York City panel approved the storage of nearly 2,000 U.S. gallons (7,600 liters) of diesel fuel on six floors of the building, part of some 80,000 U.S. gallons (300,000 liters) of fuel oil stored in the building. Community opposition had been raised regarding concerns that the presence of the fuel oil posed a fire hazard that could result in a catastrophic failure of the building. 60 Hudson Street underwent some renovations starting in 2015. In early 2022, Cordiant Digital Infrastructure announced that it would acquire the building's owner, DataGryd, whose sole property was 60 Hudson Street.

== Critical reception ==
The facade served to give emphasis to the building's shape: the 1939 WPA Guide to New York City observed that 60 Hudson Street resembled "a huge red rock projecting out of the city". Stern wrote that 60 Hudson Street's decoration was "rather integral" to the brick facade, as opposed to at the Barclay–Vesey Building, which contained decorative elements and a facade in "contradiction" to each other. Critic Paul T. Frankl stated that designs like that of 60 Hudson Street were effective, comparing them to "brick tapestries hung from the sky". Architectural writer Robert A. M. Stern described the interlocking slabs of the massing as fulfilling "Hugh Ferriss's poetic conceit of the tall building as a manmade mountain". Writing for The New York Times in 1982, Paul Goldberger described 60 Hudson Street as "fine Art Deco building [...] which powerfully closes the vista from Duane Park to the north."

== See also ==
- Art Deco architecture of New York City
- List of New York City Designated Landmarks in Manhattan below 14th Street
- 111 Eighth Avenue, another technology and telecommunications building in Manhattan constructed during the early 1930s
