= Seattle Internet Exchange =

- Full name: Seattle Internet Exchange
- Abbreviation: SIX
- Founded: 1997, June
- Location: Seattle, Washington, US
- Website: www.seattleix.net
- Members: 365
- Peak: 3.70 Tbit/s
- Daily (avg.): 2.19 Tbit/s

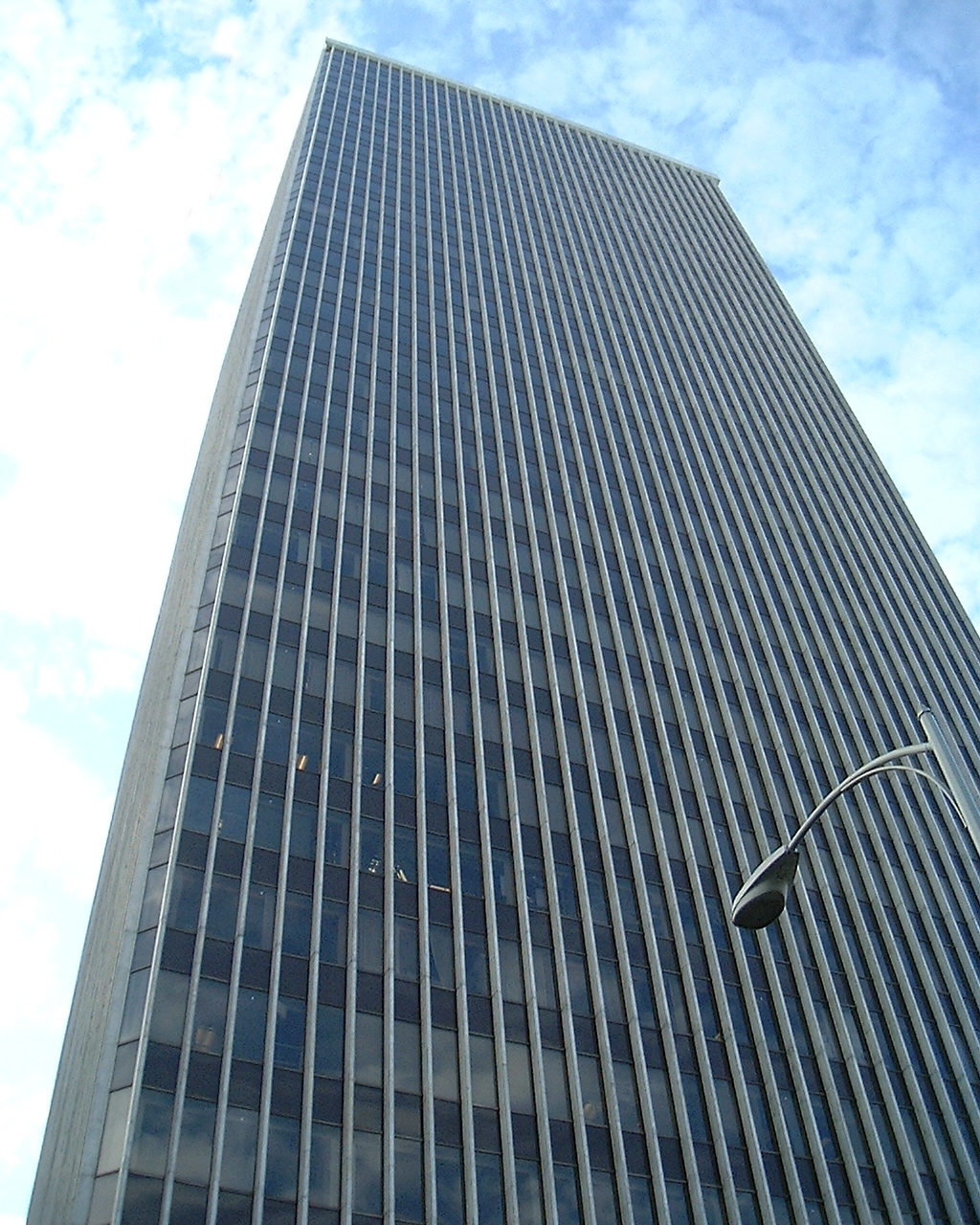
Westin Building, the primary home of the Seattle Internet Exchange

The Seattle Internet Exchange (SIX) is an Internet exchange point in Seattle, USA. Its switch fabric is centered at the Westin Building and extended to KOMO Plaza, Sabey Intergate, and other locations. The SIX is one of the most successful examples of neutral and independent peering points, created as a free exchange point originally sponsored only by donations. The SIX is the most frequently cited model upon which other neutral Internet exchanges are based, and its financial and governance models are often cited as inspiration for other exchanges. It continues to run without any recurring charges to the participants and current major funding comes from one-time 10, 100, and 400 Gbit/s port fees, as well as from voluntary contributions from stakeholders. The SIX is a 501(c)(6) tax-exempt non-profit corporation.

As of April 21, 2026, there are 368 networks (436 routers) connected to the SIX advertising at least 221,000 (147,000 IPv4, 74,000 IPv6) unique Border Gateway Protocol (BGP) routes. There are two route servers running Bird Internet routing daemon (BIRD).

== Technology ==
The core of the SIX consists of Arista Networks switches, with a 7808R3, 7512R, and 7508R at the Westin Building, a 7504R3 at KOMO Plaza, and a 7504R at Sabey Intergate. Participants may connect to the SIX core using a 1 Gbit/s, 10 Gbit/s, 40 Gbit/s, 100 Gbit/s, or 400 Gbit/s Ethernet connection (fiber) or to one of several extensions. Extensions are sponsored by colocation facilities or transport providers.

Both IPv4 and IPv6 peering is available and encouraged at the SIX, with availability dependent on the peer. Jumbo frame peering at 9000-byte maximum transmission unit (MTU) is available.

== Extensions ==
The following is a list of SIX extensions:

- Archeo Futurus: Connects participants at H5 Data Centers Seattle.
- Astound Broadband: Regional network.
- BSO/IX Reach: Worldwide WAN.
- Equinix: PAIX SEA, which is a neutral Internet exchange point operated by Equinix in Seattle, Washington.
- Minnesota VoIP: Minnesota area.
- NOCIX: North Kansas City area.
- Reliable Internet (Arrow Calgary): Calgary area.
- Wholesail Networks: Regional network.
- Wowrack: Wowrack datacenter in Tukwila, Washington.

== See also ==
- List of Internet exchange points
