= Westin Building =

Skyscraper and telecommunications hub facility located downtown Seattle, Washington

The Westin Building Exchange
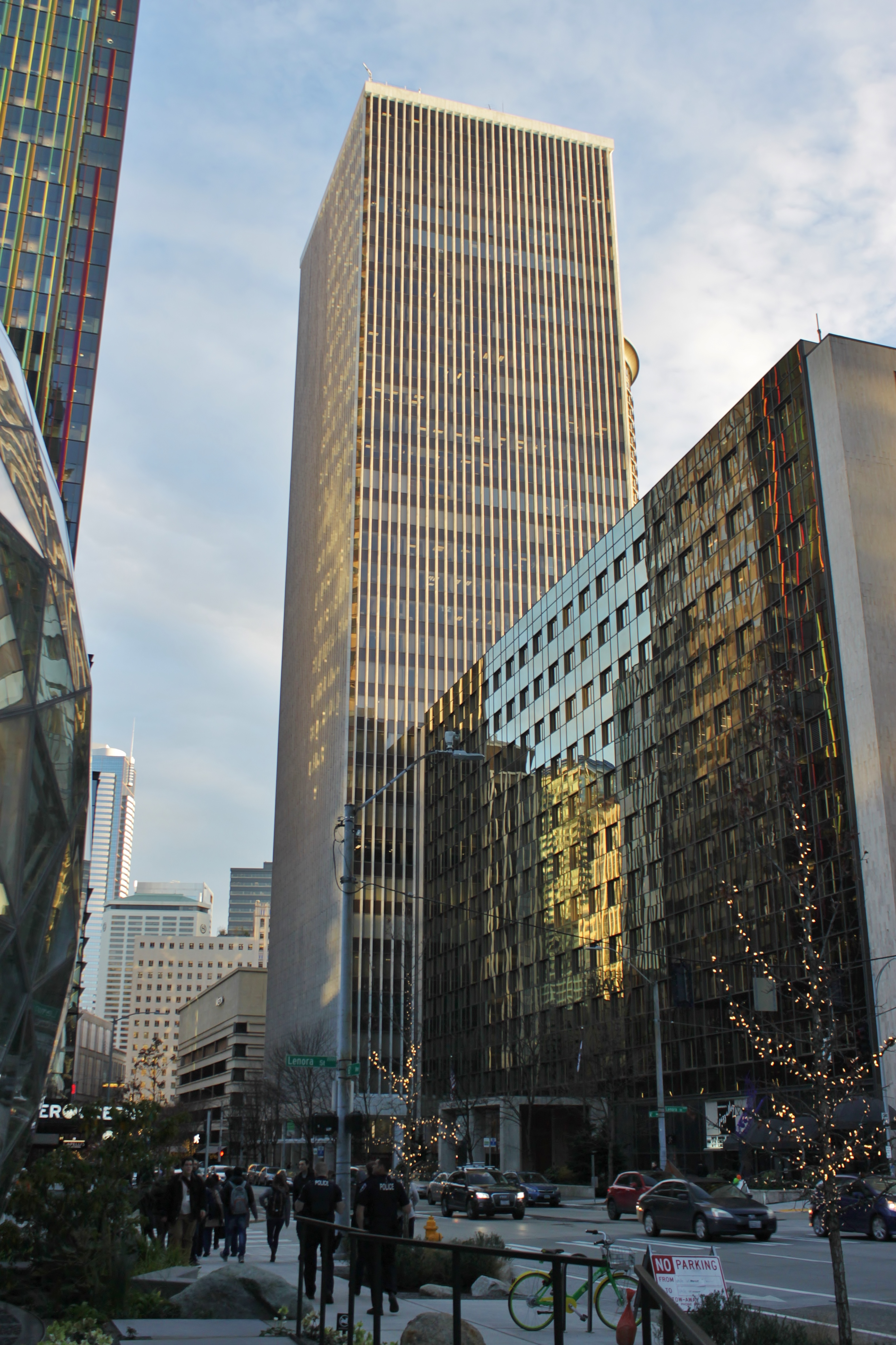

- Location within downtown Seattle
- Alternative names: Westin Corporate Tower

General information
- Type: Commercial offices Carrier hotel
- Location: 2001 Sixth Avenue; Seattle, Washington
- Coordinates: 47.6143°N 122.3385°W
- Completed: 1981
- Management: Digital Realty

Height
- Roof: 124.67 m (409.0 ft)

Technical details
- Floor count: 34
- Floor area: 386,103 sq ft (35,870.1 m^{2})
- Lifts/elevators: 8

Design and construction
- Main contractor: Hoffman Construction

The Westin Building Exchange is a major telecommunications hub facility located downtown Seattle, Washington. The building was constructed in 1981 as the Westin Building, housing the corporate offices of Westin Hotels, which was then based in Seattle. It is also home to the Seattle Internet Exchange (SIX) and Pacific Northwest Gigapop's Pacific Wave Exchange.

The facility has a pair of "Meet-me Rooms" on the 19th floor, which are used by telecommunication carriers and internet service providers to cross-connect their individual networks. These carriers situate their POPs within racks spread throughout the building, connecting back to the meet-me room via optical fiber cabling, facilitating interconnection with other carriers' infrastructure within the building. The Westin Building's meet-me room is the heart of the facility, where buyers and sellers of broadband services offer interconnectivity to their backbones and diverse services without the need to utilize telephone company provided interconnections.

As of 2019 or earlier, heat generated from the data centers in this building is piped over to Amazon's Doppler building and used to heat Doppler and several other Amazon buildings. While backup boilers are installed, they are rarely used, and Amazon estimates over the 25 year expected lifespan of the system it will save 80 million kilowatt hours of electricity, equivalent to 65 million pounds of coal, though over 80% of electricity in Seattle comes from hydropower.

In 2020, real estate investment trust Digital Realty acquired a majority stake in the building and assumed management responsibilities.
