= GI Partners =

Private equity investment firm

- Type: Limited Partnership
- Industry: Private Equity
- Founded: 2001; 25 years ago
- Founder: Rick Magnuson
- Headquarters: Four Embarcadero Center; San Francisco, California, United States
- Products: private equity funds
- AUM: $42 billion
- Website: gipartners.com

GI Partners is an American private equity firm based in San Francisco, California that focuses on middle market investments.

The company has over 100 employees with offices in San Francisco, New York, Chicago, Greenwich, CT, and Scottsdale, AZ. By 2024, the firm had raised over $29 billion in capital from leading institutional investors around the world to invest in private equity, real estate, and data infrastructure strategies.

The private equity team invests primarily in companies in the healthcare, IT infrastructure, services, and software sectors. The real estate team focuses primarily on technology and life sciences properties as well as other specialized types of real estate. The data infrastructure team invests primarily in hard asset infrastructure businesses underpinning the digital economy.

== History ==
GI Partners was founded in 2001 by Rick Magnuson.

In March 2018, GI Partners acquired a majority stake in Doxim from Strattam Capital.

In June 2019, GI Partners acquired Insurity, an insurance-services software vendor.

In January 2020, GI Partners acquired a majority interest in DRFortress, the largest data center operator based in Hawaii. In April 2025, fifteenfortyseven Critical Systems Realty (1547) and Harrison Street acquired DRFortress from GI Partners.

In August 2020, GI Partners acquired a majority interest in Clinical Ink, a global clinical trial technology company.

In November 2020, bought Valet Living, the largest amenities provider to the multifamily housing industry in the US. It was founded in 1995.

In April 2022, GI Partners announced its agreement to acquire the US based cloud software solutions company GTY Technology Holdings Inc. Upon completion of the transaction GTY became a privately held company, with the agreement stating shareholders would gain $6.30 per share of GTY stock.

In December 2023, GI Partners acquired DQE Communications for an undisclosed amount.
