= Newcomb Carlton =

American telecommunications executive

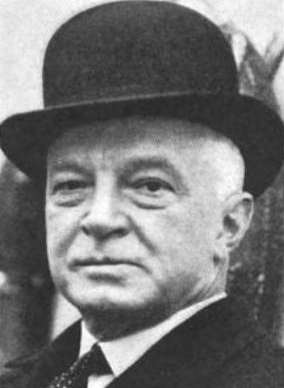
- Time magazine, January 20, 1930
- Born: February 19, 1869
- Died: March 12, 1953 (aged 84)
- Resting place: Evergreen Cemetery, Hillside, New Jersey, United States
- Employer: Western Union
- Spouse: Josephine Winslow Carlton (1870–1929)

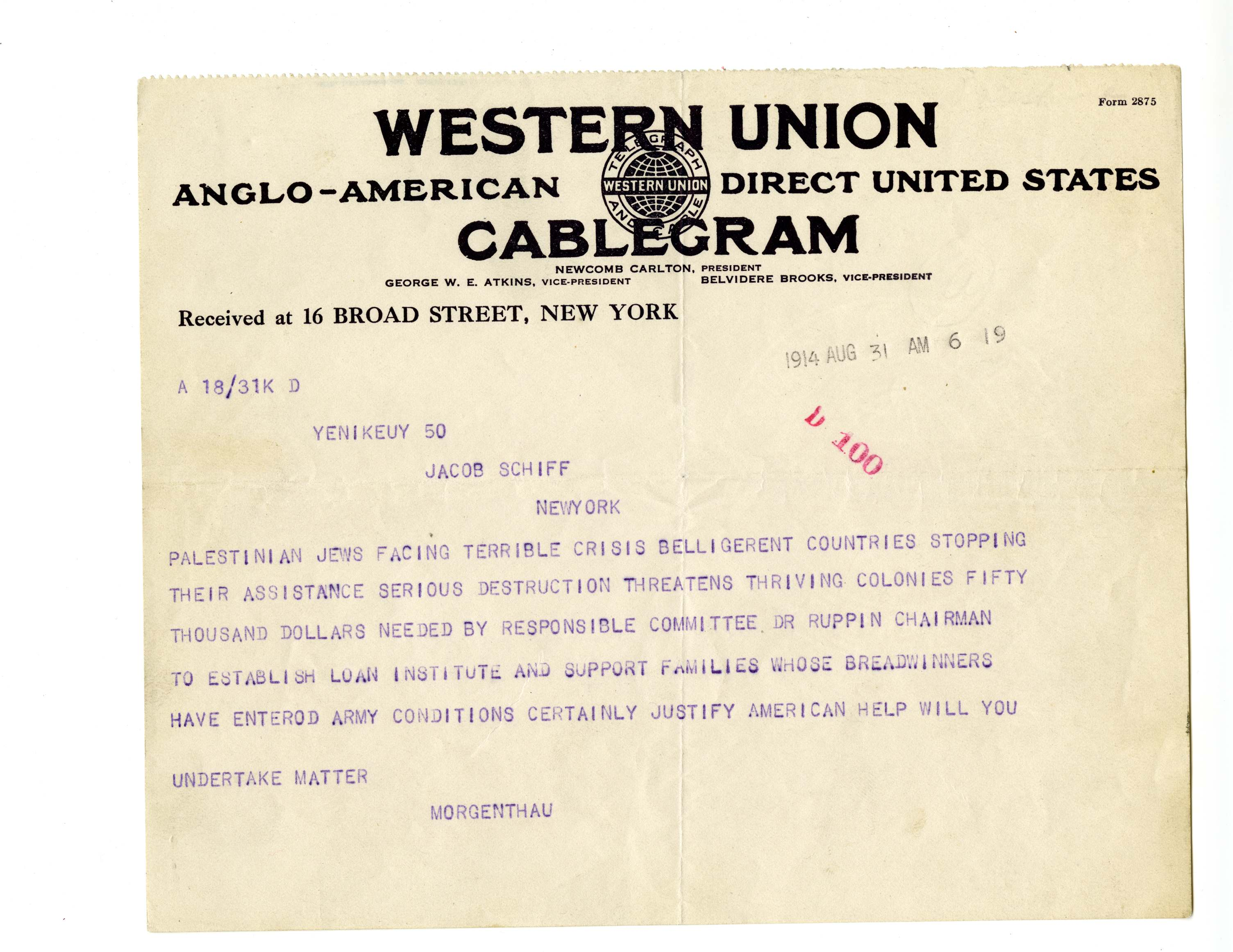
telegram, Newcomb Carlton, President of Western Union

Newcomb Carlton (1869–1953) was an American telecommunications executive. He served as president of Western Union and in 1918, when the telegraph industry was placed under government control, as director of all cable lines in the United States.

In 1933, he became chairman of the company.

He travelled extensively as part of his job.

In 1926 he was injured when he was hit by a taxi.
