= Duane Park =

Public park in Manhattan, New York

Coordinates: 40°43′02″N 74°00′34″W

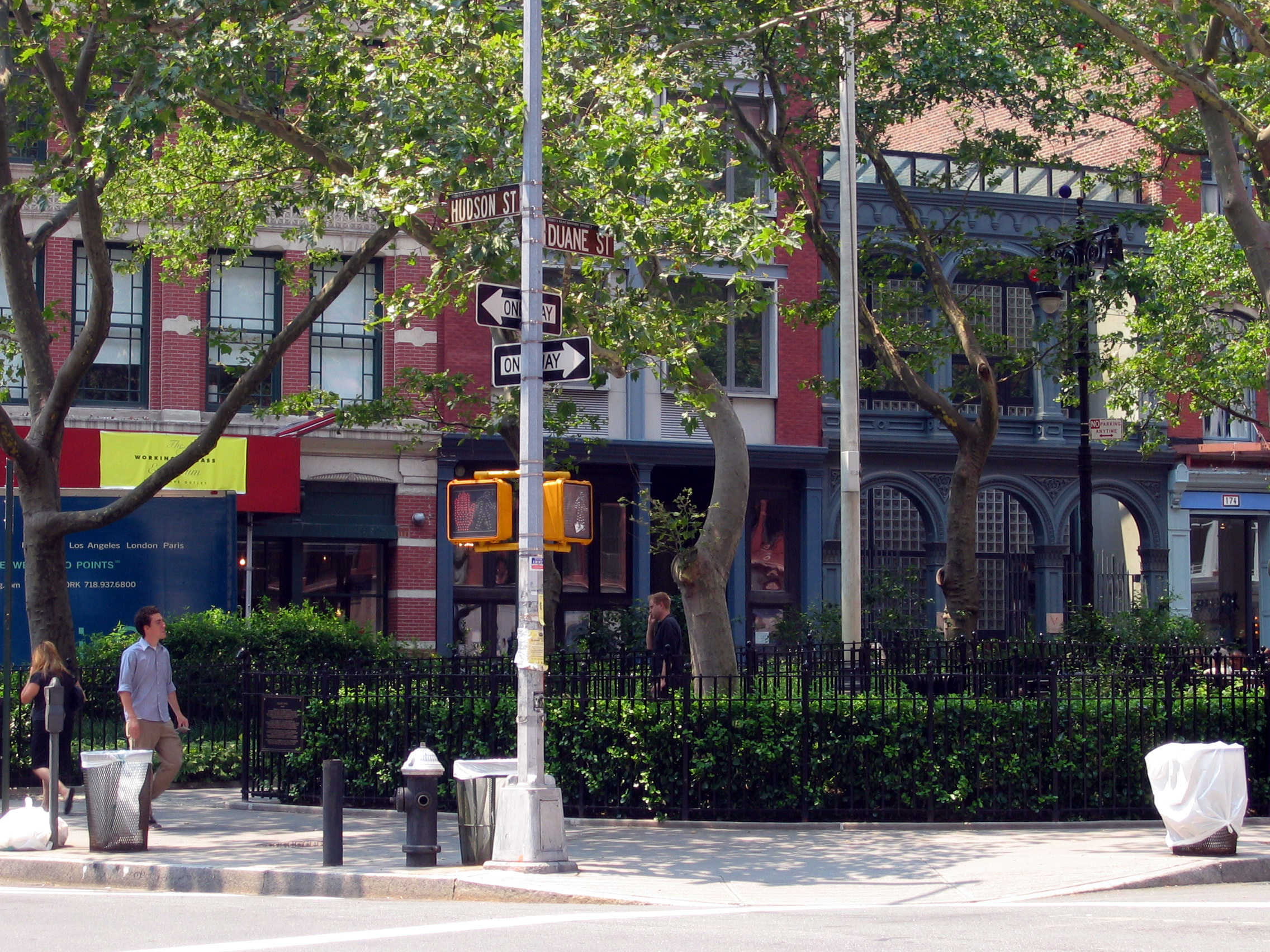
Duane Park in Tribeca

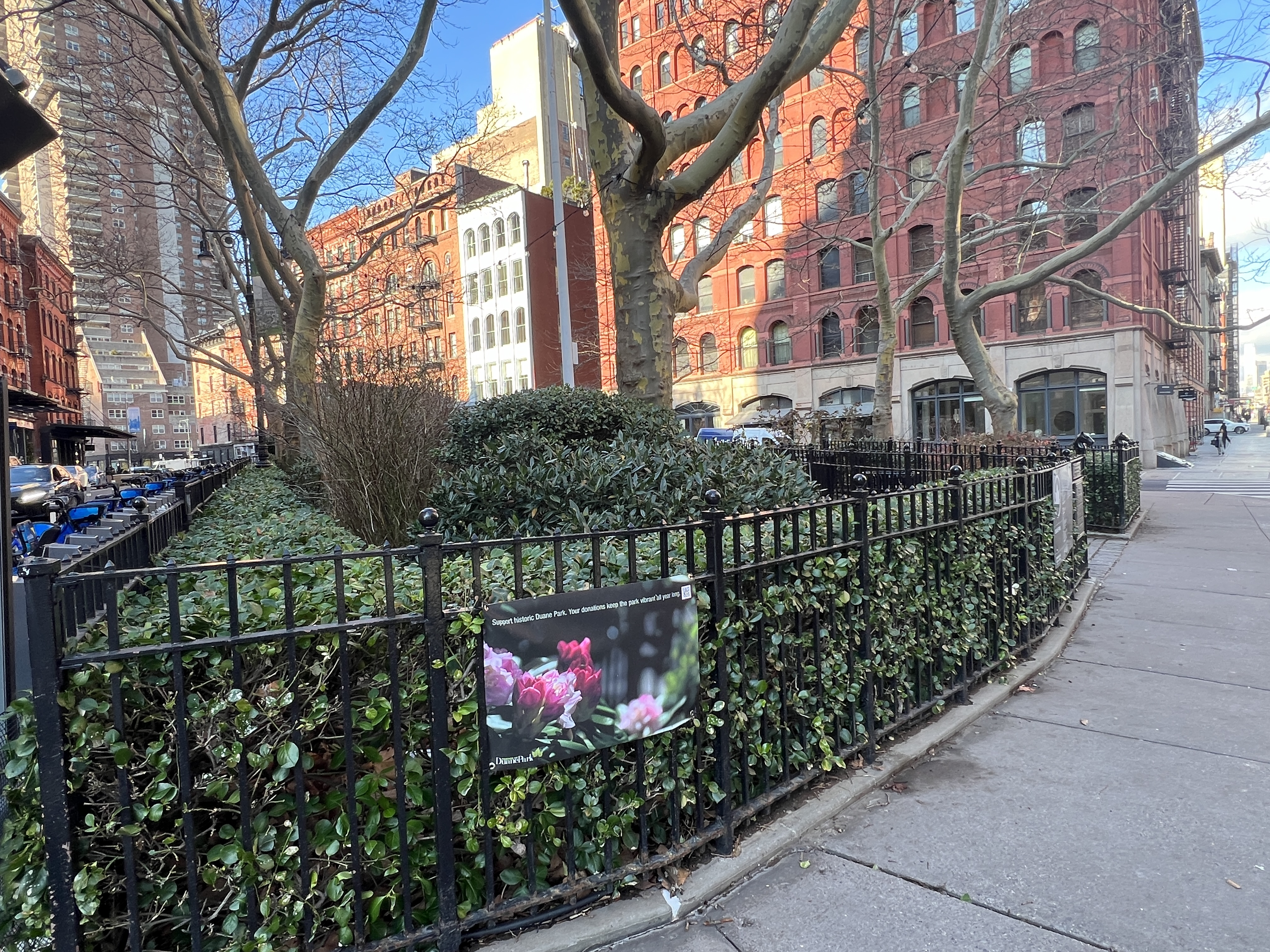
Duane Park in Tribeca

Duane Park is a small, triangular public urban park located in the diamond of the Tribeca neighborhood of Manhattan, New York City. The park is bordered by Hudson Street to the east and branches of Duane Street on its north and south sides. It was originally laid out by Calvert Vaux.

The park is supported by a non-profit group, The Friends of Duane Park, whose website contains a brief history of the park and its neighborhood.

The city of New York purchased Duane Park in 1795 from Trinity Church for five dollars. The park is surrounded by turn-of-the-century, architecturally ornate loft buildings which were constructed during the 19th century. Duane Street, which borders the park, is named for James Duane, a noted parishioner at Trinity Church.
