= Hudson Street (Manhattan) =

Street in Manhattan, New York

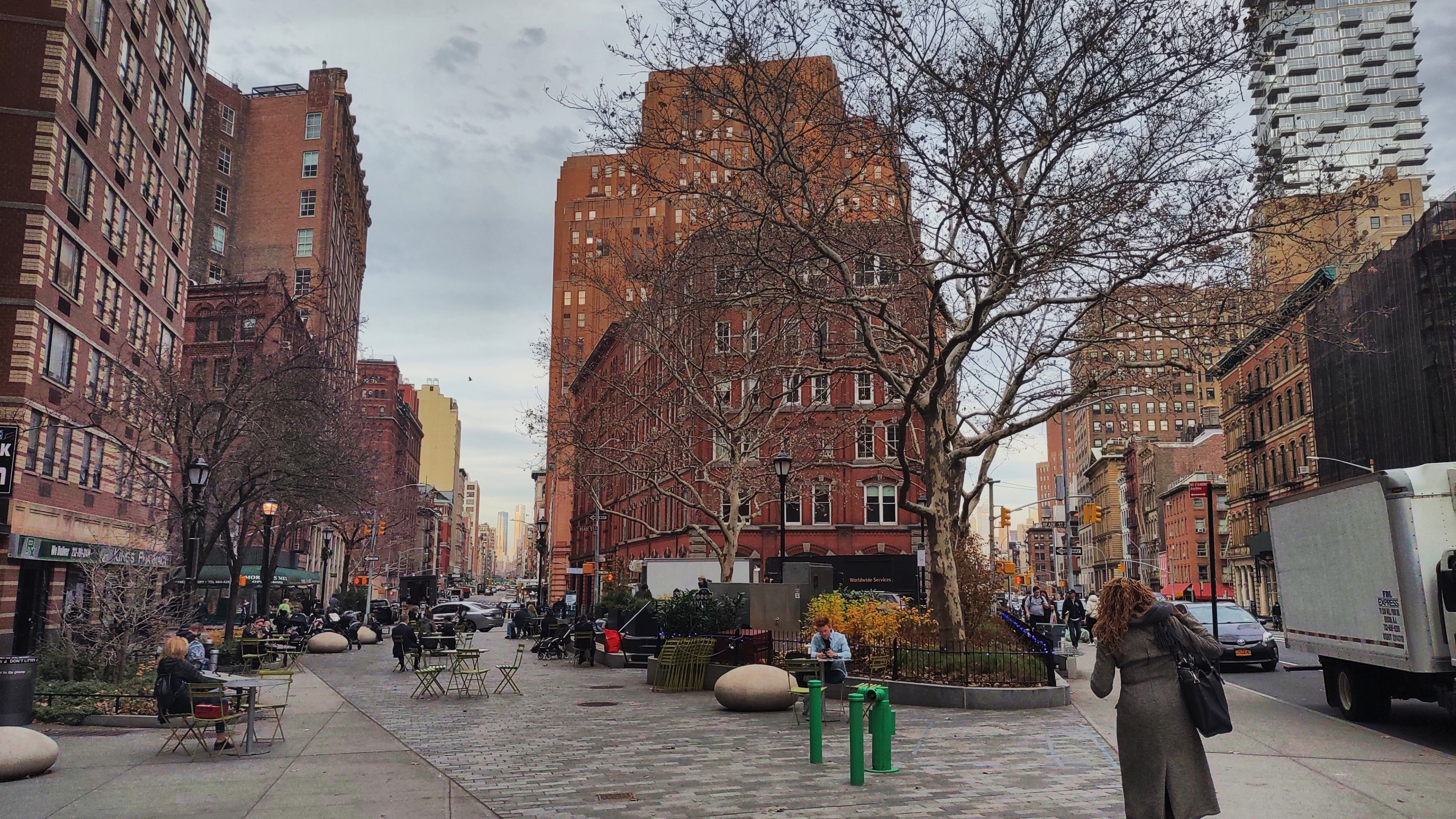
Bogardus Plaza at the south end of Hudson Street

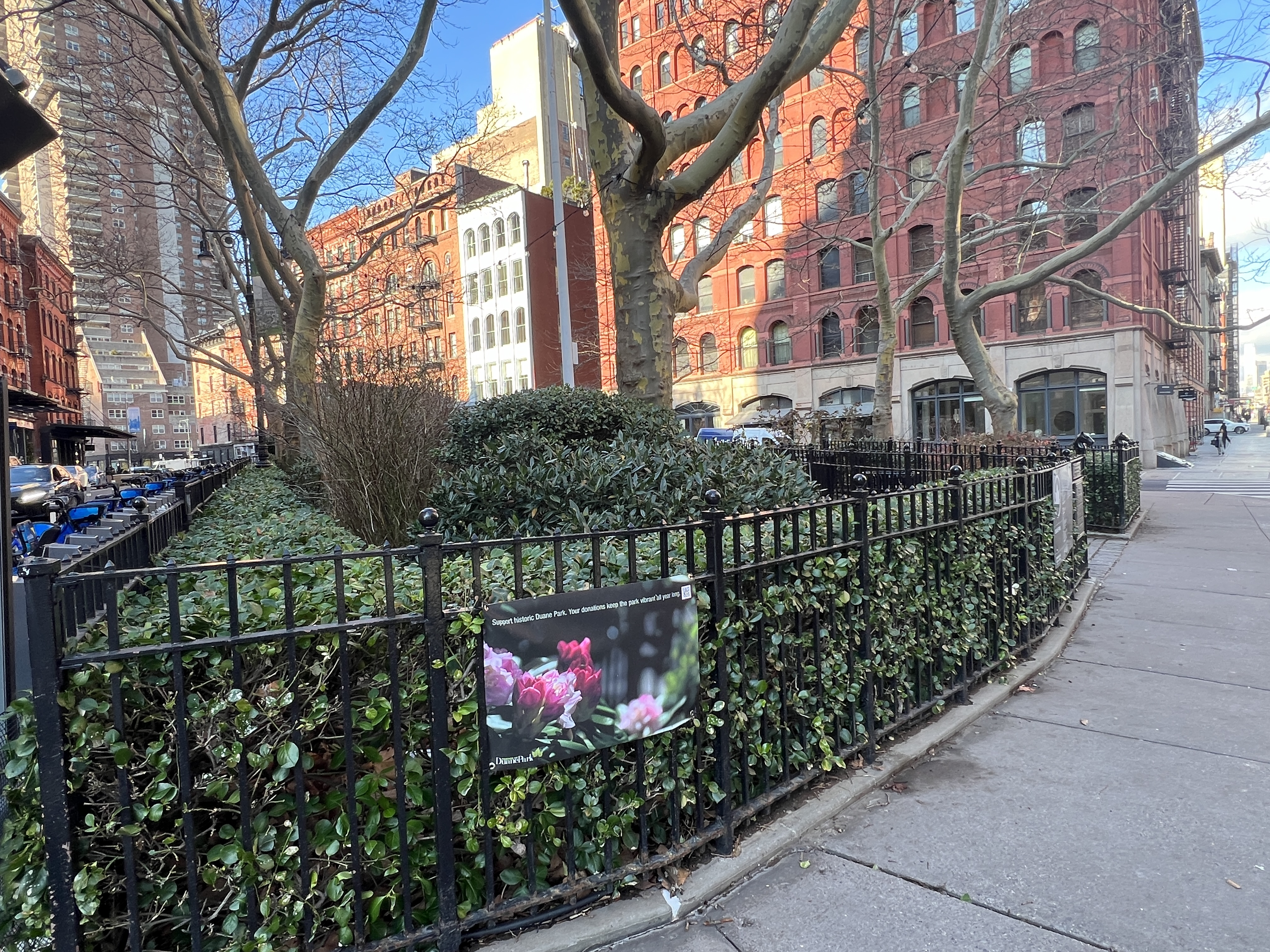
Duane Park

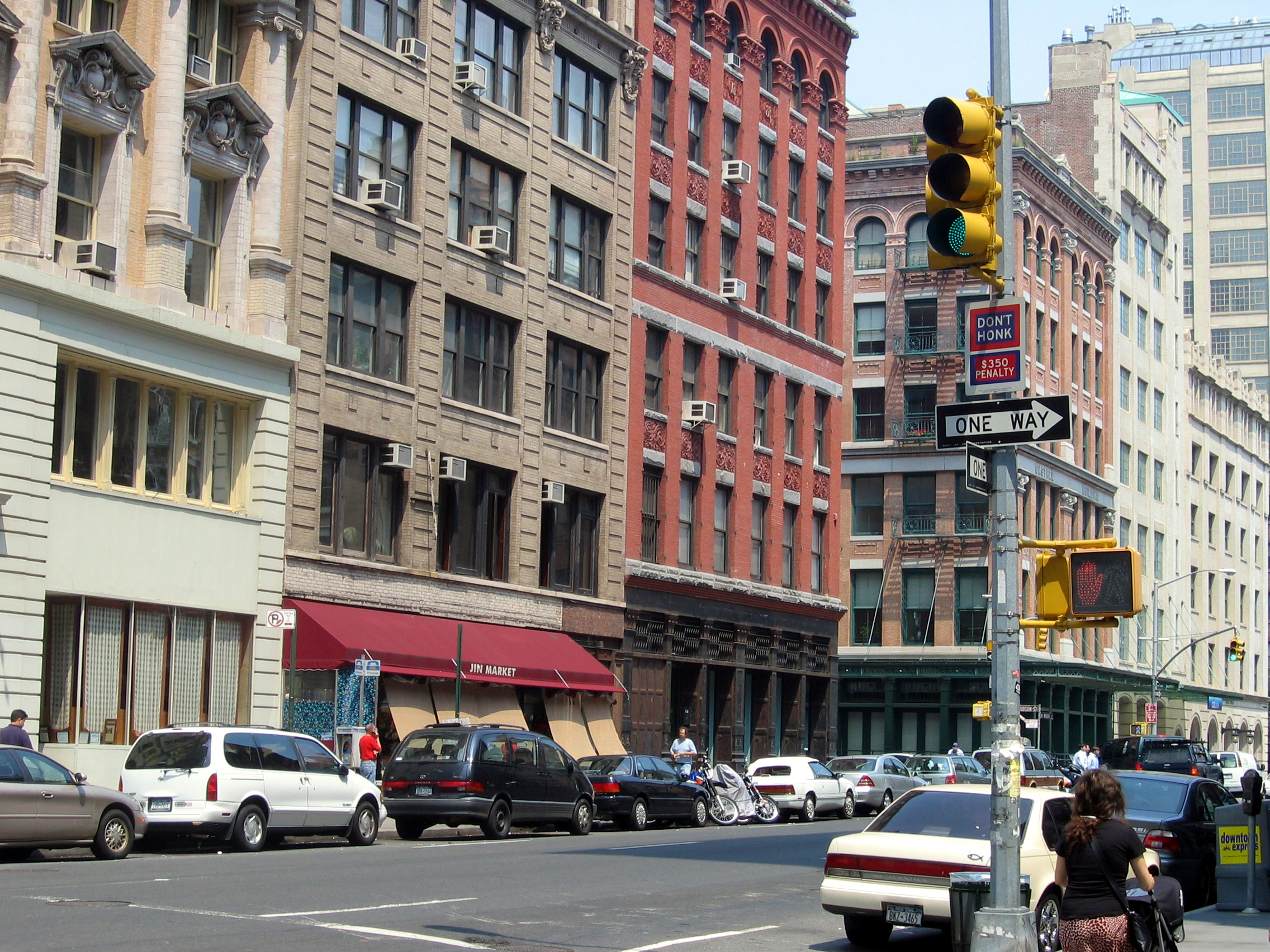
Hudson Street in the Tribeca neighborhood of Lower Manhattan

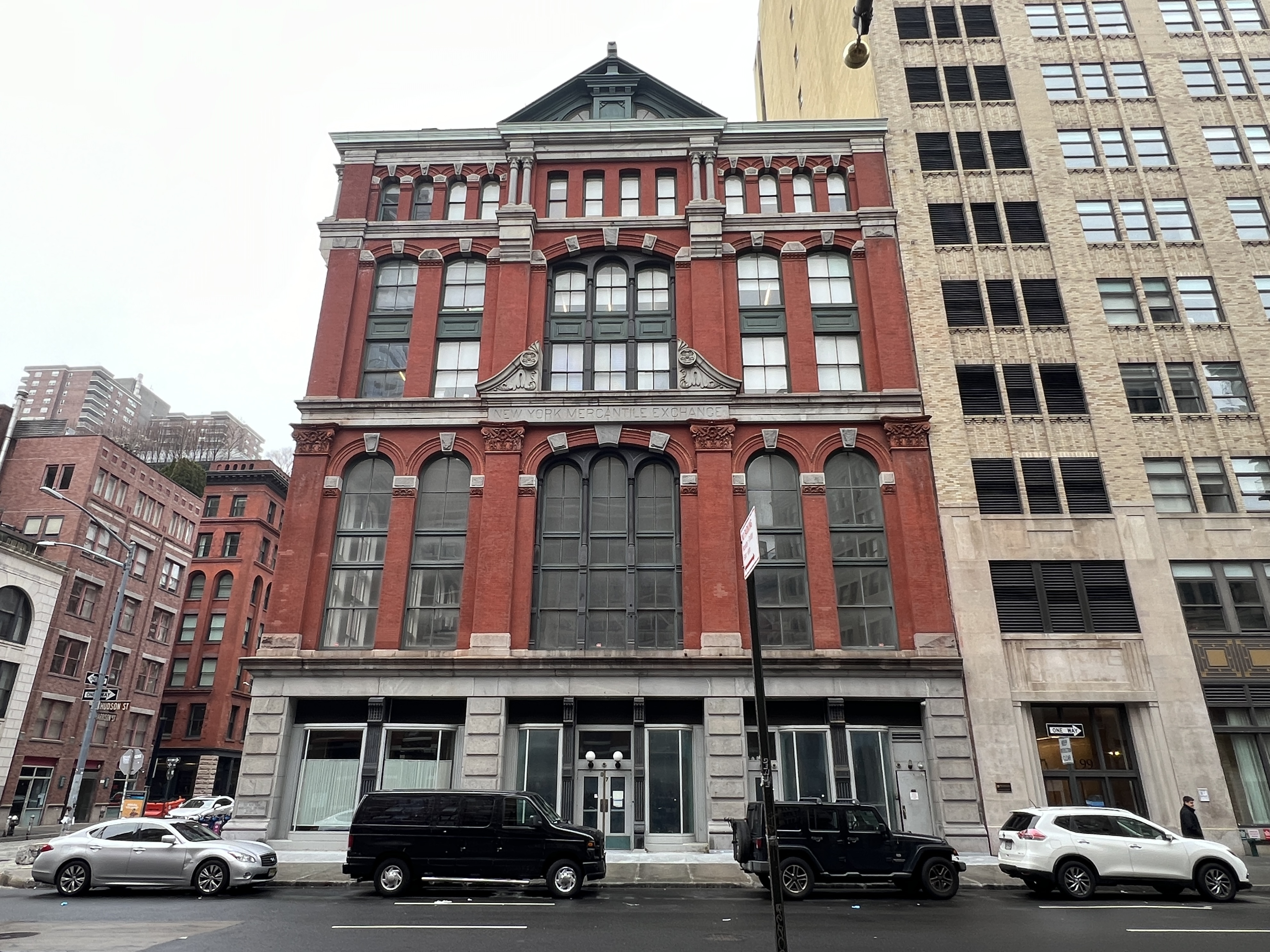
Former New York Mercantile Exchange building

Hudson Street is a north–south oriented street in the New York City borough of Manhattan running from Tribeca to the south, through Hudson Square and Greenwich Village, to the Meatpacking District.

== Route and landmarks ==
Hudson Street has two distinct one-way traffic patterns that meet at Abingdon Square, at the street's intersection with Eighth Avenue and Bleecker Street. The southern portion of Hudson Street carries northbound traffic and begins at the intersection of West Broadway and Chambers Street. At Abingdon Square, the traffic is directed onto Eighth Avenue. Meanwhile, the section of Hudson Street north of Abingdon Square runs from 14th Street to Eighth Avenue. At 14th Street, southbound traffic from Ninth Avenue splits off into this street. Just below 14th Street, it is one of the major streets in the Meatpacking District. At Abingdon Square, traffic on Hudson Street goes into Bleecker Street.

60 Hudson Street, the former Western Union headquarters that later was converted into an internet hub, is located between Worth and Thomas Streets in Tribeca. Just to the north, the former New York Mercantile Exchange building is located at the corner of Hudson and Harrison Streets in Tribeca. The street is home to the U.S. headquarters of the Pearson-owned Penguin Group. Money.net, which produces and operates an alternative platform to the Bloomberg Terminal, is located at 333 Hudson Street.

=== Incidents ===
Other notable buildings on this stretch of Hudson Street include The Church of St. Luke in the Fields and its garden, the White Horse Tavern, which is known for being the bar where poet Dylan Thomas drank and collapsed before he died of alcohol poisoning, and the headquarters of radio station WQHT, also known as Hot 97, which was the site of several shootings, including a gunfight between entourages of 50 Cent and The Game in 2005.

== Transportation ==
The uptown M20 bus runs on the northbound Hudson Street between Harrison Street and Eighth Avenue (downtown buses use 7th Avenue South and Varick Street). The southbound portion of the street is used in its entirety by the M11, M12 and M14A SBS, with the first heading north on Greenwich Street and the rest on Eighth Avenue.

The Christopher Street PATH subway station is located on Christopher Street just west of Hudson Street.

=== Road use ===
At St. John's Park near Canal Street, Hudson Street is one of the primary access routes leading to and from the Holland Tunnel.

A bike lane is located in the roadway, connecting a bike lane in Ninth Avenue to one in Bleecker Street. In May 2019, it was announced that Hudson Street between Canal and Houston Streets would be reconstructed with expanded sidewalks and a new bike lane for $27 million. Two reconstruction projects along Hudson Street were completed in 2022, adding pedestrian space and bike lanes; the project resulted in increased occupancy of storefronts on Hudson Street.

== Notable residents ==
- John Cheever, writer
- Jane Jacobs, writer and activist, lived at 555 Hudson Street above a candy shop.
- Tiger Woods, professional golfer moved to Hudson Street in August 2010.

== In popular culture ==
- A.E.S. Hudson Street was a comedy television show running on ABC from March 16, 1978 through April 20, 1978. This short-lived series followed the poorly equipped Adult Emergency Service hospital set on Hudson Street.
- The cast of MTV's 2001 series The Real World: Back to New York lived in a four-story loft apartment on 632 Hudson Street.
- The Northern Irish electronic duo Agnelli and Nelson released an album entitled Hudson Street in 2000.
- In the 1982 film Annie, the orphanage Annie comes from is the Hudson St. Home for Girls.
- In the 1986 movie Highlander, Connor McLeod's antique shop is located on Hudson Street.
