= Meet-me room =

Place in a colocation centre

A meet-me room (MMR) is a place within a colocation center (or carrier hotel) where telecommunications companies can physically connect to one another and exchange data without incurring local loop fees. Services provided across connections in an MMR may be voice circuits, data circuits, or Internet Protocol traffic.

An MMR provides a safe production environment where the carrier handover point equipment can be expected to run on a 24/7 basis with minimal risk of interruption. It is typically located within the data center.

To interconnect, each company orders a patch from their cage or suite to the MMR and then arrange for the organization running the facility to connect them together. These physical connections may be an optical fiber cable, coaxial cable, twisted pair, or any other networking medium.

Typically, a meet-me room will discourage or disallow customers from installing large amounts of equipment. However, multiplexing equipment is often welcome in the meet-me room, so that a customer can have a single connection between the room and the rest of their equipment in the building, and the multiplexing equipment can then break that out to allow for direct, private connections to several other organizations present in the meet-me room.

An Internet exchange point can also be present in a meet-me room to allow many organizations in the meet-me room to interchange traffic without having to make physical interconnections between every possible pair of organizations.

== Examples ==
- One Wilshire: Los Angeles, California
- Westin Building: Seattle, Washington
- MAE-West (located in Market Post Tower): Downtown San Jose, California
- 60 Hudson Street, New York
- 111 Eighth Avenue, New York
- Infomart: Dallas, Texas
- 350 E. Cermak Rd: Chicago
- 165 Halsey Street, Newark, New Jersey
- 399 Chai Wan Road, Hong Kong
- 100 Renaissance Center, Detroit, Michigan
