= 165 Halsey Street =

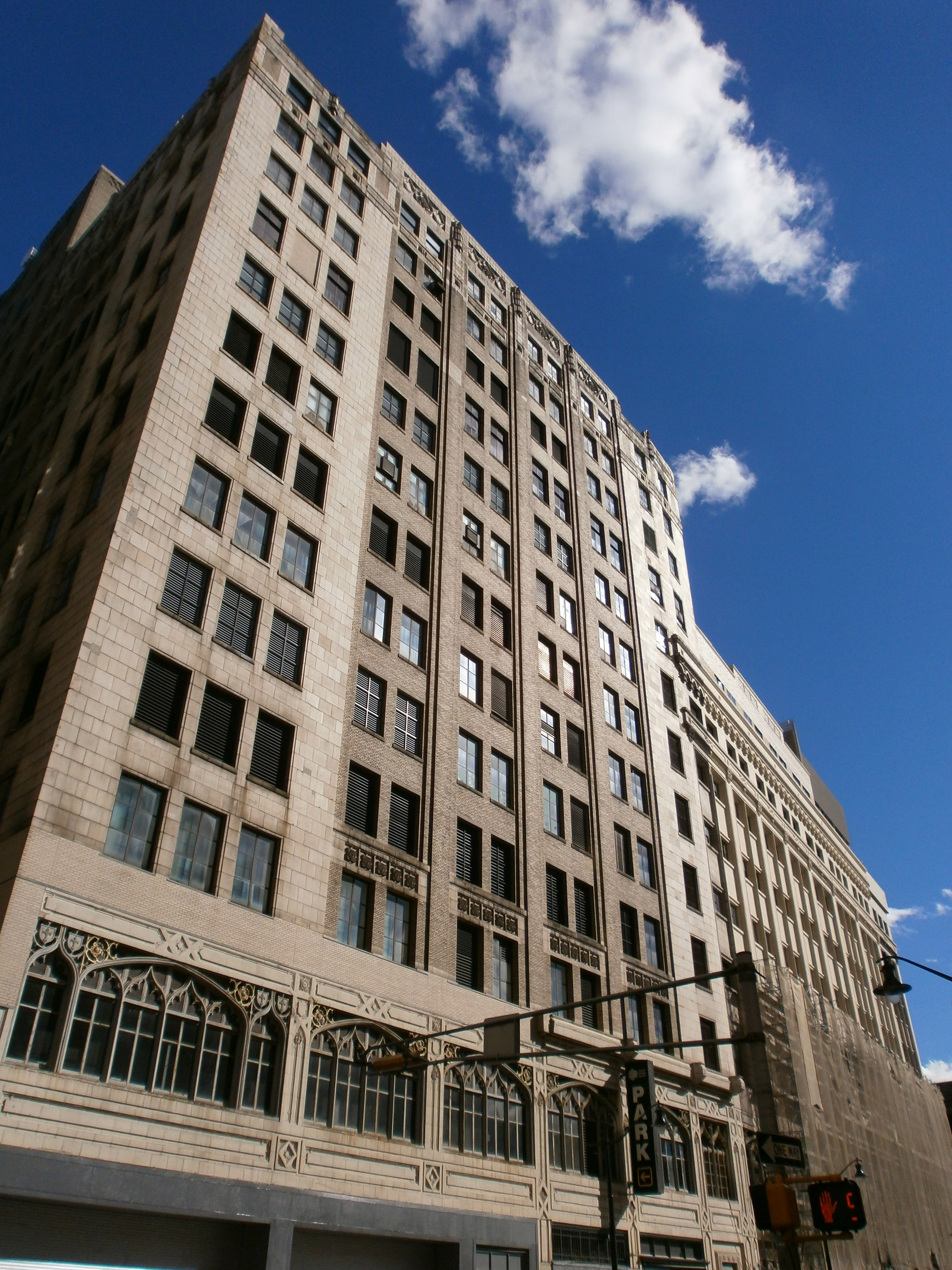
- Seen from Washington Street
- Interactive map of the 165 Halsey Street area
- Former names: Bamberger Building, Macy's Department Store

General information
- Location: 165 Halsey Street, Newark, New Jersey
- Coordinates: 40.736817°N 74.173851°W
- Construction started: 18 February 1911
- Completed: 15 October 1912 (original building); 1922 (first expansion); 1929 (second expansion)

Height
- Height: 184 feet (56 m) (original building and first expansion); 227 feet (69 m) (second expansion)

Technical details
- Floor count: 8 (original building and first expansion); 14 (second expansion)
- Floor area: 500,000 sq ft (46,000 m^{2}) (original building); 580,000 sq ft (54,000 m^{2}) (first expansion); 1,200,000 sq ft (110,000 m^{2}) (second expansion)

Design and construction
- Architect: Jarvis Hunt

165 Halsey Street, formerly known as the Bamberger Building, is a 14-story office tower in Downtown Newark, New Jersey. Built in 1912–1929, it was designed by Jarvis Hunt. The building spans the entire block between Halsey Street, Market Street, Washington Street, and Bank Street. 165 Halsey Street is a major colocation center in the New York metropolitan area; according to the Center for Land Use Interpretation, it is among the world's largest carrier hotels. It is a contributing property to the Four Corners Historic District.

== Bamberger's ==
165 Halsey Street was initially built in 1912 as an eight-story, 500,000-square-foot (46,000 m^{2}) flagship store of Bamberger's to expand the operations from its original store across Halsey Street. It was expanded twice in 1922 and 1929 to become a 14-story building with a total floor area of 1.2 million square feet (110,000 m^{2}). The building address was 109-135 Market Street. After Bamberger's expanded its operations to suburban stores, some parts of the building were converted to an office space and the building became the headquarters of Bamberger's. After R. H. Macy & Co. took over Bamberger's, the operations in New Jersey stores retained the Bamberger's name. As the sales continued to decline at the Newark location and Macy's New York and New Jersey merged their operations, the building lost the headquarters status and the store itself was renamed Macy's. In 1992, Macy's closed the Newark store and the building remained vacant until 1996.

== Colocation center ==
After the closure in 1992, the building stayed vacant until October 1996. Samuel Jemal saw a potential of retrofitting the building into a major telecommunication center. The building was built with sturdy construction and its large areas are suitable for large equipment of telecommunication switches and data center operations. The building became known as 165 Halsey Street after the conversion. Early tenants included Level 3 Communications, and MCI Communications which took up a large amount of space within 18 months of the reopening. By 2004, many other telecommunication companies including Verizon Communications and Qwest had moved in.

165 Halsey Street is one of the three main carrier hotels in New York metro. The other two are 111 8th Avenue and 60 Hudson in Manhattan. The tenants of 165 Halsey Street are large telecommunication companies, colocation providers and data center providers:

- AboveNet
- BT America
- Centurylink
- Equinix
- IPC Network Services
- Level 3 Communications
- Lexent Metro Connect
- NetCarrier
- Sidera
- Telecom Italia
- Verizon Business
- XO Communications
- Zayo Group

=== Meet-me rooms ===
The owner of 165 Halsey Street created the first meet-me room to provide cross connection services in 2000 and the business has since expanded. In 2016, the fifth meet-me room was created. It was the first time that the facility offered DC power to supply directly to the equipment. As of 2026, there are six meet-me rooms on five floors of the building with a total floor area of more than 240,000 square feet (22,000 m^{2})

=== Connectivity ===
There are about 60 networks that support peering to exchange data at 165 Halsey Street. These include a variety of industries. Each of major cloud computing providers, Amazon AWS, Microsoft Azure and Google Cloud Platform, has a point of presence at the building. Content and interactive gaming providers such as Netflix, Apple TV and Sony PlayStation are also connected to other networks at the building. Other networks are those of telecommunication companies, internet service providers, network (including dark fiber) and data center providers, and educational organizations.

There are four internet exchange points at the building: DE-CIX New York, NetIX, NYIIX, and Equinix Internet Exchange. The building is also a principal access point of the Apollo optical submarine communications cable system crossing the Atlantic Ocean. Other Apollo principal access points in New York metro are 111 Eighth Avenue, 60 Hudson Street, and the cable landing point in Manasquan, New Jersey.

Major financial exchanges have presence at the building. The Secure Financial Transaction Infrastructure (SFTI) of Intercontinental Exchange (the operator of New York Stock Exchange and other global exchanges) that connects to more than 120 trading venues globally has nine access points in the United States. One of those is located at the building. Nasdaq Express Connect, a low-latency point-to-point network that connects Nasdaq data center with trading venues in New York, Chicago and Canada, uses two colocation centers at 165 Halsey Street and 111 Eighth Avenue to cross connect with the SFTI to access NYSE, NYSE Arca, NYSE American, and NYSE National. CME Group has a network solution called EConnect to allow its clients to access its markets from New York and New Jersey locations. EConnect has point-of-presence locations at 165 Halsey Street, 111 8th Ave, and Equinix data centers in Secaucus, New Jersey.

== See also ==
- List of tallest buildings in Newark
- Hahne and Company
