= Lexent Metro Connect =

American telecommunications provider

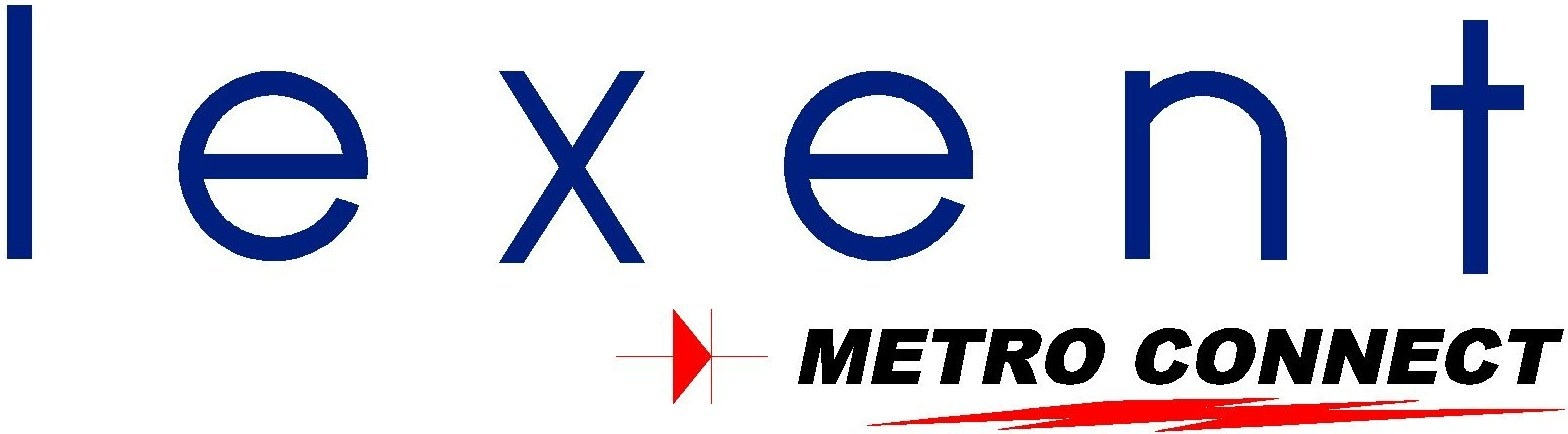
- Company type: Private
- Industry: Telecommunications; IT Services
- Founded: New York, NY, USA (1946 by "Hugh O'Kane Electric Co.")
- Founder: Hugh O'Kane Sr.
- Headquarters: New York, NY, USA
- Area served: New York and New Jersey and surrounding areas
- Key people: Ray LaChance - President and CEO
- Products: Dark Fiber; Fractional Dark Fiber; Interconnectivity Between Buildings; Project Management; Implementation
- Website: Lexent.net

Lexent Metro Connect was a New York City based neutral telecommunications provider that owned, operated, built and maintained its own dark fiber network in New York, Northern New Jersey, and surrounding areas. Based in New York City, Lexent provided services in the boroughs of Manhattan, the Bronx, Queens, and Brooklyn, as well as in Northern New Jersey. It had 150 fiber route miles and served over 200 commercial buildings.

The company was acquired by Lightower Fiber Networks in 2010.

Lexent constructed and leased dark fiber networks for carriers, wireless service providers, service providers, financial and enterprise customers. Lexent also provided engineering and project management support to carriers looking to build telecommunications networks in New York as well as consultation on fiber networks in various metropolitan areas around the United States.

Lexent's dark fiber network provided connectivity between regional carrier hotels, central offices, and Enterprise Buildings. The network included four river crossings over the Hudson River, Harlem River and East River, and spanned over 100 route miles of metro fiber.

== History ==
Lexent Metro Connect LLC, a wholly owned subsidiary of Lexent Inc., was formed in 2002 and awarded a NYC High Capacity Telecommunications Franchise with the non-exclusive right to construct, operate and maintain local high capacity telecommunications networks and services in the New York City metro market. Lexent's sister company, Hugh O'Kane Electric Co Inc. was founded in 1946 by Hugh O’Kane Sr. as an electrical company specializing in services to the graphic arts and printing industries. The two companies operated independently, and Lexent was privately owned by the O’Kane Family, until being acquired in 2010 by Lightower Fiber Networks.

== List of Points of Presence (POPs) ==
Lexent Metro Connect had 27 PoPs in 13 different carrier hotel buildings and fiber access to over 100 enterprise buildings throughout Manhattan, the Bronx and Northern New Jersey including:

=== 32 Avenue of the Americas, NYC ===
- The Hub (Building MMR), 24th floor

=== 60 Hudson Street, NYC ===
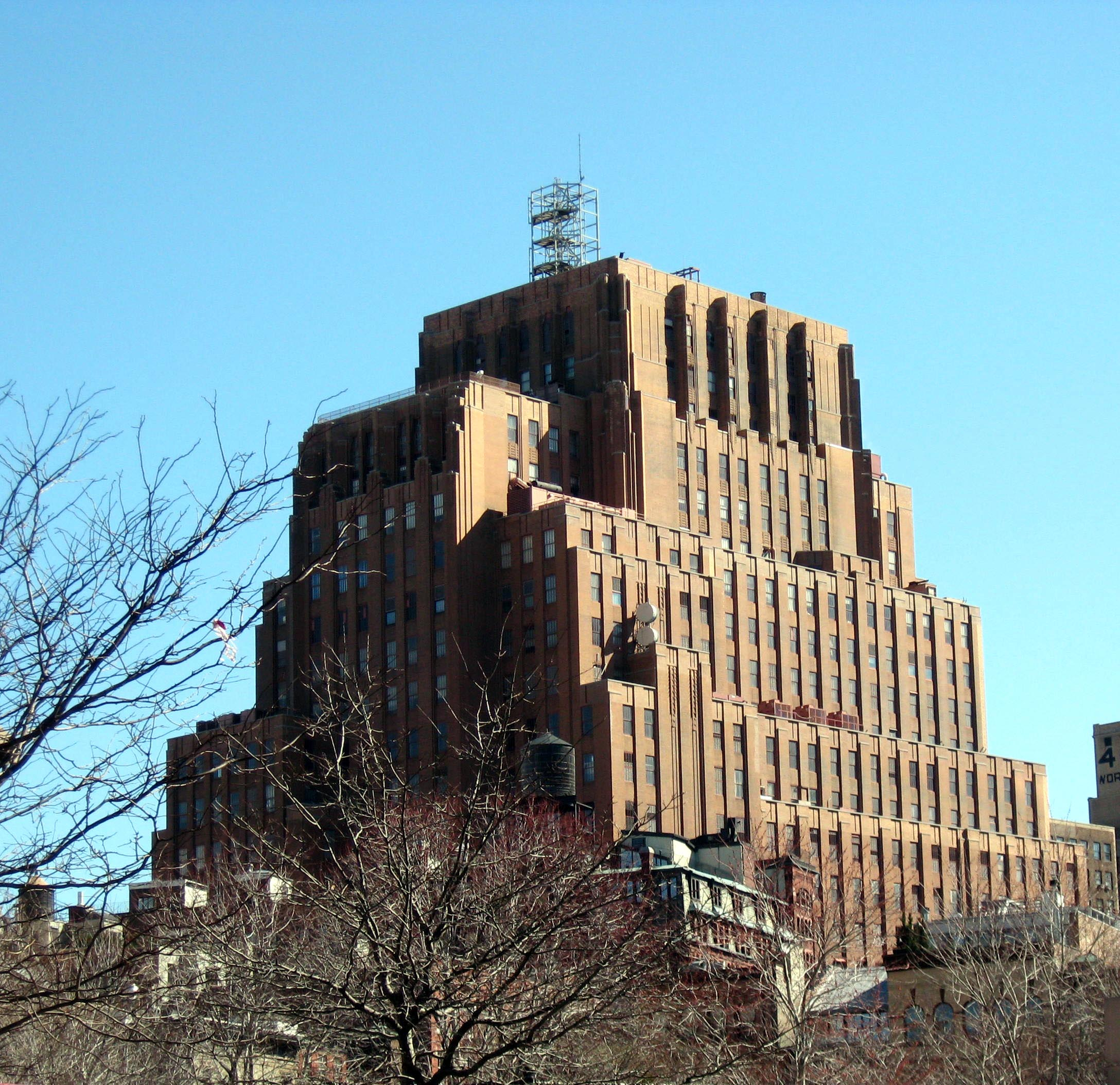
60 Hudson Street

- Fibernet (a Zayo Group Company), 1st floor
- Telx, 9th floor
- Metcom Network Services, Datacenters 10th floor and 23rd floor. Interconnect presence all floors including Roof and Basement.
- XO, 13th floor

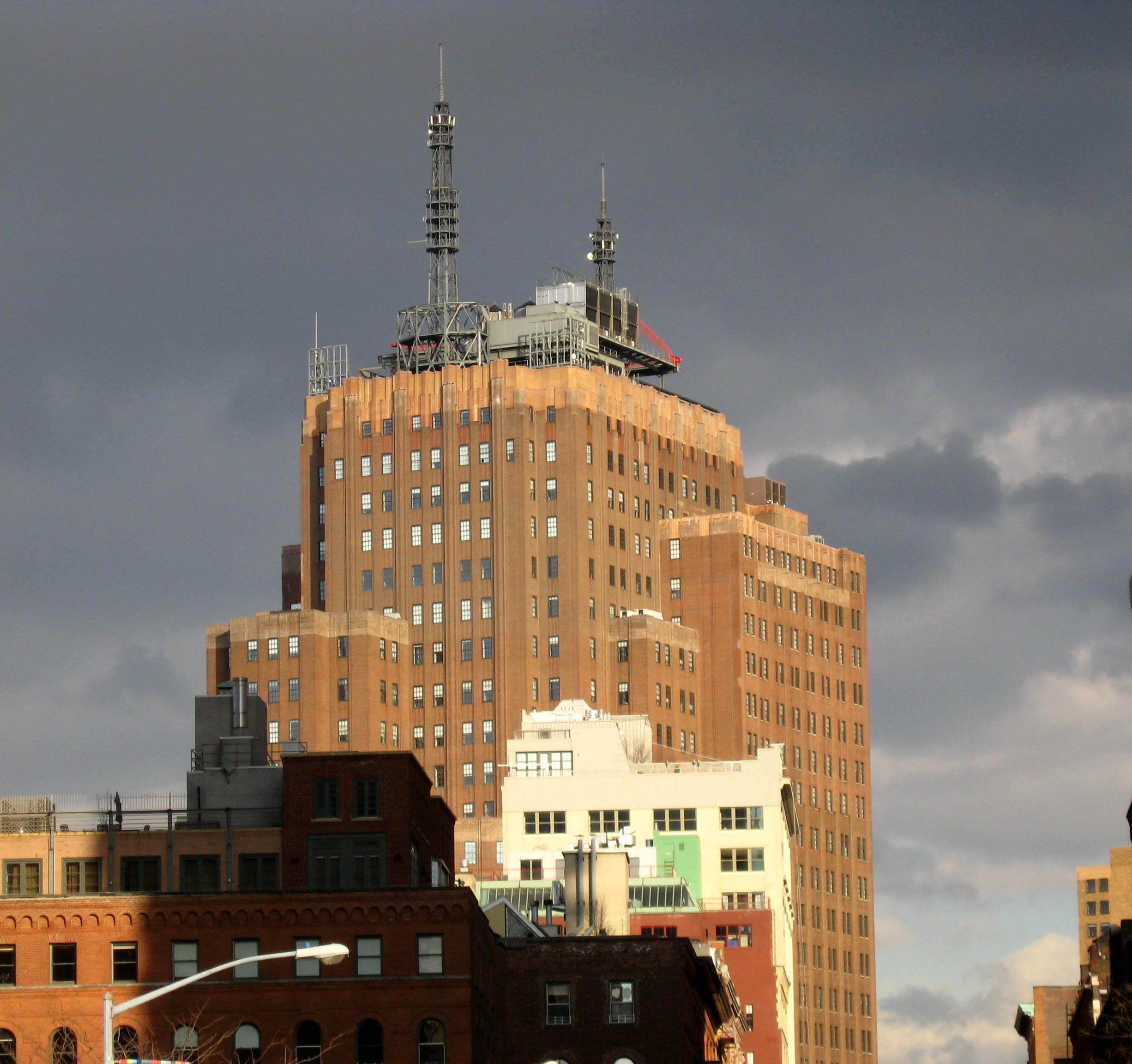
The AT&T Long Distance Building at 32 Avenue of the Americas

=== 75 Broad Street, NYC ===
- Fibermedia, 19th floor
- Metcom Network Services, Datacenter 25th floor. Interconnect presence all floors including Roof and Basement.
- Fibermedia, 28th floor
- InterNAP

=== 85 Tenth Avenue, NYC ===
- L-3 Communications Vault, Basement
- Client Datacenter, 7th floor

=== 111 Eighth Avenue NYC ===
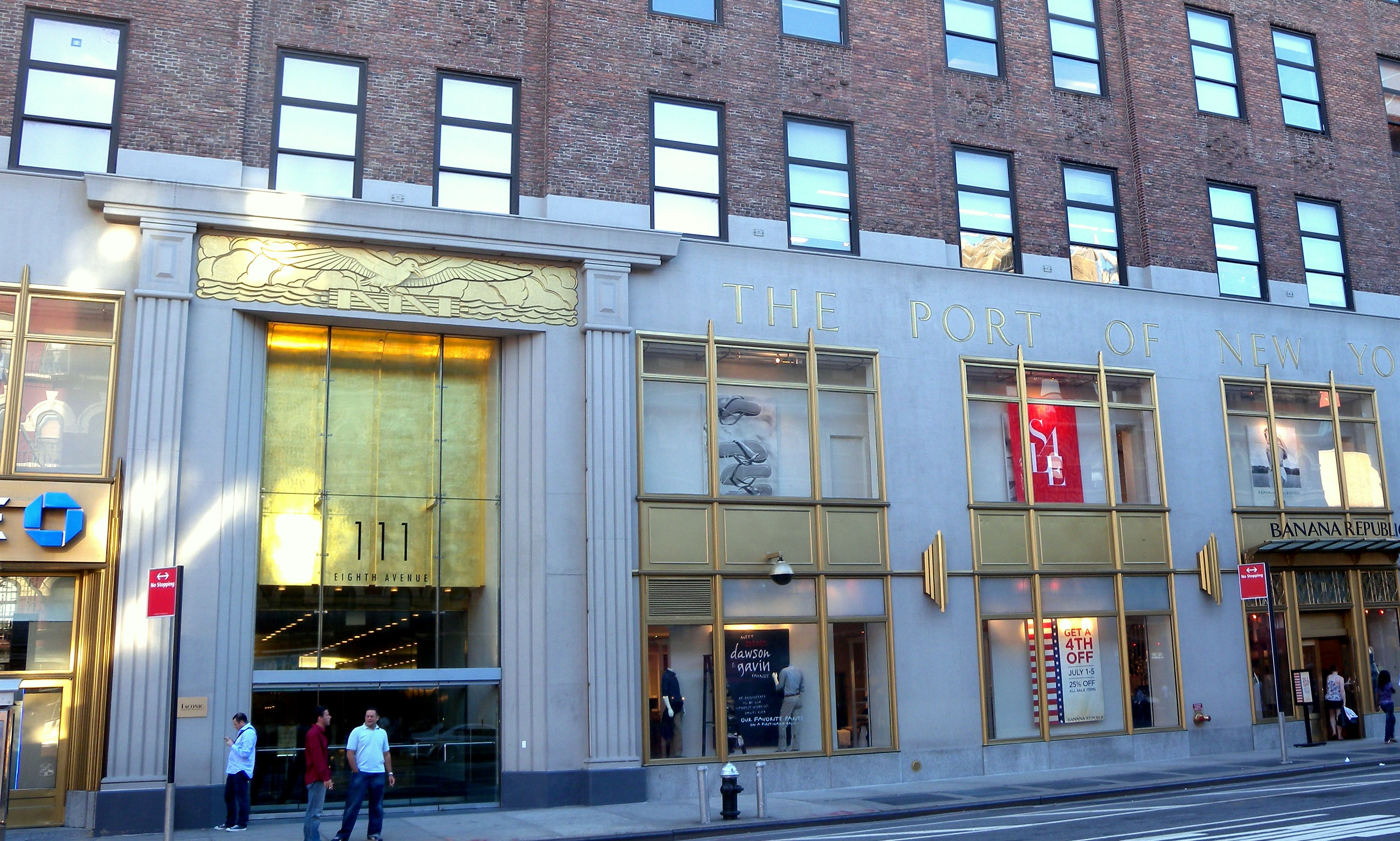
111 8th Ave

- Level 3, 3rd floor
- Switch and Data, 5th floor
- Telx (fka NYC Connect), 8th floor
- Telx (fka NYC Connect), 15th floor

=== 325 Hudson Street, NYC ===
- Building Meet-Me-Room, Basement
- Flag Telecom, 4th floor

=== 601 West 26th Street, NYC ===
- Level 3 (fka Wiltel), 6th floor
- SBC SuperPoP, 6th floor
- Broadview, 4th floor

=== 1095 Avenue of the Americas, NYC ===
- Verizon CO-CATT, Basement, 1095 Avenue of the Americas

=== 165 Halsey Street, Newark, NJ ===
- 165 Halsey Street Meet-Me-Room, 9th floor

=== 300 Boulevard East, Weehawken, NJ ===
- Telx Meet Me Room, 1st floor
- JPMC, 1st floor
- Savvis, 2nd floor

=== 275 Hartz Way, Secaucus, NJ ===
- Equinix Facility, 1st floor

=== 755 Secaucus Rd., Secaucus, NJ ===
- Equinix Facility, 1st floor

=== 5851 West Side, North Bergen, NJ ===
- Switch and Data
