= Networx-BG =

Networx Bulgaria Ltd.
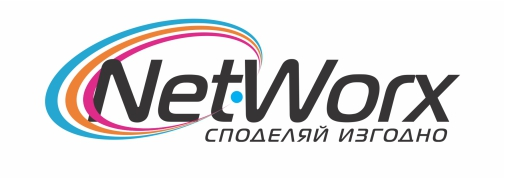
- Native name: Нетуъркс България
- Romanized name: Netuŭrks Bŭlgariya
- Company type: Private company
- Industry: Telecommunications
- Founded: 2000
- Headquarters: Ruse, Bulgaria
- Key people: Svilen Maximov, CEO
- Services: Internet access; Digital television; IPTV; Digiturk TV; Wi-Fi
- Website: www.networx.bg

Networx Bulgaria is private owned Telecommunication Company based in Northern Bulgaria. In this region they hold more than 350 000 homes covered with FTTB. In many of the cities Networx is the carrier with best developed underground infrastructure and penetration where other carriers and even the incumbent do not provide FO connectivity. Currently they provide CATV and Internet service to home subscribers and companies where they rank number 5 in Bulgaria (source national research). They also provide large portfolio of services to other telecoms - DF rent, DF IRU, transport, MAN, colocation, etc. They operate services for most of the known operators in Bulgaria. They also operate services and collaborate with international operators like Prime Telecom, GTS and RomTelecom. Established during year 2000 Networx Bulgaria achieved a leading position into regional market, delivering residential, business and wholesale IP, MAN and FO services.

== Network and Support ==
Based on own underground FO infrastructure, Networx is currently delivering FTTB connections and supporting one of the largest MAN, providing high class IP connectivity.

- Network - over 800 km. own underground, metro and intercity FO network
- Services - full range telecom services - FO rent & IRU, MAN, IP transport and transit, VPN, colocation, site construction
- Business customers - more than 240 business customers and over 35 national and international telecom operators

Operating 24/7 NOC monitoring system, the company supports 24 hours maintenance teams - fully equipped and trained to maintain any metro and intercity connections.

== Telecom class services ==
- Dark Fiber, MAN, IP PN, Co-location, duct rental, power supply etc.
- Construction of urban and intercity telecommunications routes
- Maintenance of any type wired telecommunications networks - 24/7 high response
