= Sidera Networks =

Defunct American telecommunications company

- Type: Private company
- Industry: Telecommunications
- Predecessor: RCN Corporation
- Founded: 1993
- Founders: David McCourt and Peter Kiewit Sons
- Defunct: 2012
- Fate: Merged
- Successor: Lightower Fiber Networks
- Headquarters: New York City, United States
- Area served: United States
- Products: Fiber optic networks and infrastructure services

Sidera Networks was an American telecommunications company headquartered in New York City, which primarily provided fiber-optic network infrastructure to cellular carriers, financial services, education, healthcare, government, legal services, and media industries. The company was acquired by Lightower Fiber Networks on April 11, 2013.

== History and acquisitions ==
Sidera Networks began as RCN Corporation, a publicly traded telecommunications company, based out of Herndon, VA. RCN Corporation was founded in 1993 by developer David McCourt and Peter Kiewit Sons' Inc.

In 1998, RCN Corporation became one of the ten largest Internet service providers in the country after acquiring Virginia-based Erols Internet, Inc. and Boston-based UltraNet Communications to strengthen the data side of its business. That same year, RCN acquired Interport Communications in New York City and Springfield, Massachusetts-based JavaNet, Inc., which linked high schools and colleges to the Internet.

In March 2006, RCN Corporation created the subsidiary, RCN Business Solutions, with the acquisition of Con Edison Communications (CEC), a wholly owned subsidiary of Consolidated Edison Inc. RCN Business Solutions also built and operated its own fiber optic network in New York City. This network leveraged the electric utility rights of way.

After acquiring NEON Communications in November 2007, RCN Business Solutions became RCN Metro Optical Networks, providing telecommunication services to enterprises and carrier customers. Founded in 1989 as FiveCom, NEON owned and operated a fiber optic network in twelve Northeastern and mid-Atlantic states and was a wholesale service provider of high bandwidth transport services to service providers and Fortune 100 companies.

In September 2010, RCN Metro Optical Networks re-launched as Sidera Networks. The change was a result of ABRY Partners, LLC's acquisition of RCN Corporation on August 26, 2010.

Later that year, Sidera Networks made two additional acquisitions. In November 2010, Sidera acquired Cross Connect Solutions, Inc. a Philadelphia-based colocation provider, adding 28,000 square feet (2,600 m^{2}) of colocation space to Sidera's existing portfolio. In December 2010, Sidera Networks acquired Long Island Fiber Exchange] (LIFE), adding 900 miles (1,400 km) of fiber and 550 lit buildings to its footprint.

On December 27, 2012, Sidera announced that it would merge with Lightower Fiber Networks in a transaction valued at over $2 billion led by Berkshire Partners, a Boston-based investment firm. Pamlico Capital, a significant Lightower investor, and ABRY Partners, a significant Sidera investor, would remain as investors in the new company. The combined company was led by then Lightower CEO, Rob Shanahan.

== Services ==
Sidera Networks' suite of facilities-based services included:

- Ethernet
- SONET
- Wavelength
- Internet access
- Colocation
- Custom Private Optical Network
- Dark fiber network
- Central Office Access
- Managed Services including Network Operations Center, Managed Router and Remote Hands services

== Footprint ==
Sidera Networks' footprint included: Albany, New York, Baltimore, Boston, Burlington, Chicago, Hartford, Manchester, New York City, Long Island, Newark, Philadelphia, Portland, Providence, Washington D.C., London and Toronto.

- Fiber Miles: Approximately 450,000
- Route Miles: Approximately 12,500
- On-Net Locations: Approximately 2,900
- Colocation Facilities: 30
