= 360networks =

Telecommunications carrier

360networks, Inc.
- Industry: Telecommunications
- Founded: February 5, 1998; 28 years ago
- Founder: Jerry Tharp; David Lede; Clifford Lede
- Defunct: December 1, 2011; 14 years ago
- Fate: Acquired by Zayo Group
- Headquarters: Seattle, Washington

360networks, Inc. was a Canadian-based wholesale telecommunications carrier. The company developed many long-haul fiber optic communications network routes throughout North America, many along railroad rights of way, consisting of both dark fiber and lit fiber. These long-haul routes included Chicago to New Orleans, Chicago to Denver, Chicago to Detroit, Chicago to New York, Seattle to Los Angeles, and Denver to San Francisco. In 2011, the company was acquired by Zayo Group.

== History ==
The company was founded as Pacific Fiber Link, L.L.C. on February 5, 1998, as a subsidiary of Ledcor Industries of Canada, a member of the Ledcor Group of Companies, owned by the Lede family. It commenced business operations on May 31, 1998.

As the fiber optic telecommunications industry boomed, one of the greatest impediments to rapid growth for the telecoms was the acquisition of the rights of way within which to lay the fiber optic cables. The Ledes came up with a solution to this problem and negotiated a deal with the Canadian National Railway to install the cable in the railroad's rights of way alongside the tracks. The company made significant contributions to the linear construction industry by inventing and patenting the Railplow, that is mounted on a flatbed railcar and used to rapidly excavate a trench alongside railroad tracks, install conduits used for housing fiber optic cables, then backfilling the trench and completing the construction and installation process within a very short span of time. This technology enabled 360networks to rapidly lay out a North American fiber optic network throughout Canada and the United States along and within numerous railroad rights of way. The patent for the Railplow was transferred to a subsidiary of the two companies and 360networks received a royalty-free, exclusive license for the use of the Railplow, giving it a significant advantage over some of its competitors that also utilized rail corridors.

Initially, the company focused on building a fiber optic route from Seattle to Sacramento. In 1999, it changed its name to Worldwide Fiber Networks, Inc. and its focus toward a global network.

In 2000, the company changed its name to 360networks Inc., and its United States entity to 360networks (USA)inc., to better describe its 360-degree focus on a global network. It hired Greg Maffei, the former chief financial officer of Microsoft, as its new chief executive officer of the company and received private equity investments from Michael Dell, Nathan Myhrvold, Liberty Media, and News Corp. During the dot-com bubble, on January 2, 2000, the company undertook its initial public offering, raising C$2.4 billion (US$1.45 billion) and giving the company a market capitalization of C$20.6 billion. and its stock was traded on the NASDAQ in the United States under the ticker TSIX, and on the Toronto Stock Exchange in Canada under the ticker, TSX.

In May 2000, the company acquired 1 million square feet of space to house computer networking equipment in Los Angeles, Atlanta and Dallas for $144 million in cash and stock.

In August 2000, the company acquired 11,000 miles of fiber optic infrastructure from Call-Net Enterprises Incorporated for $162.5 million.

In November 2000, the company had a market capitalization of $13 billion, despite only $234 million in revenue for the first six months of 2000.

In May 2001, the company received a license to own infrastructure in Japan.

In early June 2001, the company skipped a debt payment.

On June 28, 2001, the company filed bankruptcy in Canada and the United States.

In October 2002, WL Ross & Co acquired 12.5% of the company.

In November 2002, the company emerged from bankruptcy. The company also acquired Group Telecom.

In May 2003, the company acquired the U.S. communications business of Dynegy.

In November 2003, the company sold assets to Qwest.

In January 2004, the company bought the assets of Touch America out of bankruptcy.

In May 2004, the company sold its Canadian assets to Bell Canada for C$275 million.

In July 2005, Greg Maffei vacated his position as CEO to work for Oracle Corporation, but remained chairman.

In December 2011, the company was acquired by Zayo Group.
