= DE-CIX New York =

Internet exchange point in New York

- Full name: DE-CIX New York
- Founded: 2013
- Location: New York metropolitan area, United States
- Website: nyc.de-cix.net
- Members: 282
- Peak: 1.68 Tbit/s

DE-CIX New York is a carrier and data center-neutral internet exchange point (IX or IXP) in the New York/New Jersey metro owned and operated by DE-CIX North America Inc.

DE-CIX New York is distributed across carrier hotels and data centers in the region, including 60 Hudson Street, 111 8th Avenue, 32 Avenue of the Americas, 325 Hudson Street, 165 Halsey Street (Newark), 85 10th Avenue, 375 Pearl Street and 2 Emerson Lane (Secaucus), and is available at over 110 access points. The exchange supports settlement-free interconnection between Internet backbones (peering).

The Internet exchange addresses the peering problem in the North American Internet exchange market, as existing Internet exchanges do not offer carrier or data center-neutral services. These neutral services are characteristic of the European model of Internet exchanges, which promotes a more competitive market for interconnection, pricing and general bandwidth growth.

DE-CIX New York was announced in September 2013, began taking customer orders in November 2013 and passed the first customer packets across the exchange in May 2014. DE-CIX New York is built on a 100 Gigabit Ethernet-capable switching system that supports large numbers of 100 GE ports. It uses multiple dark fiber rings to provide a scalable infrastructure to the exchange.

== See also ==
- List of Internet exchange points
