= Isaiah Chavous =

American entrepreneur

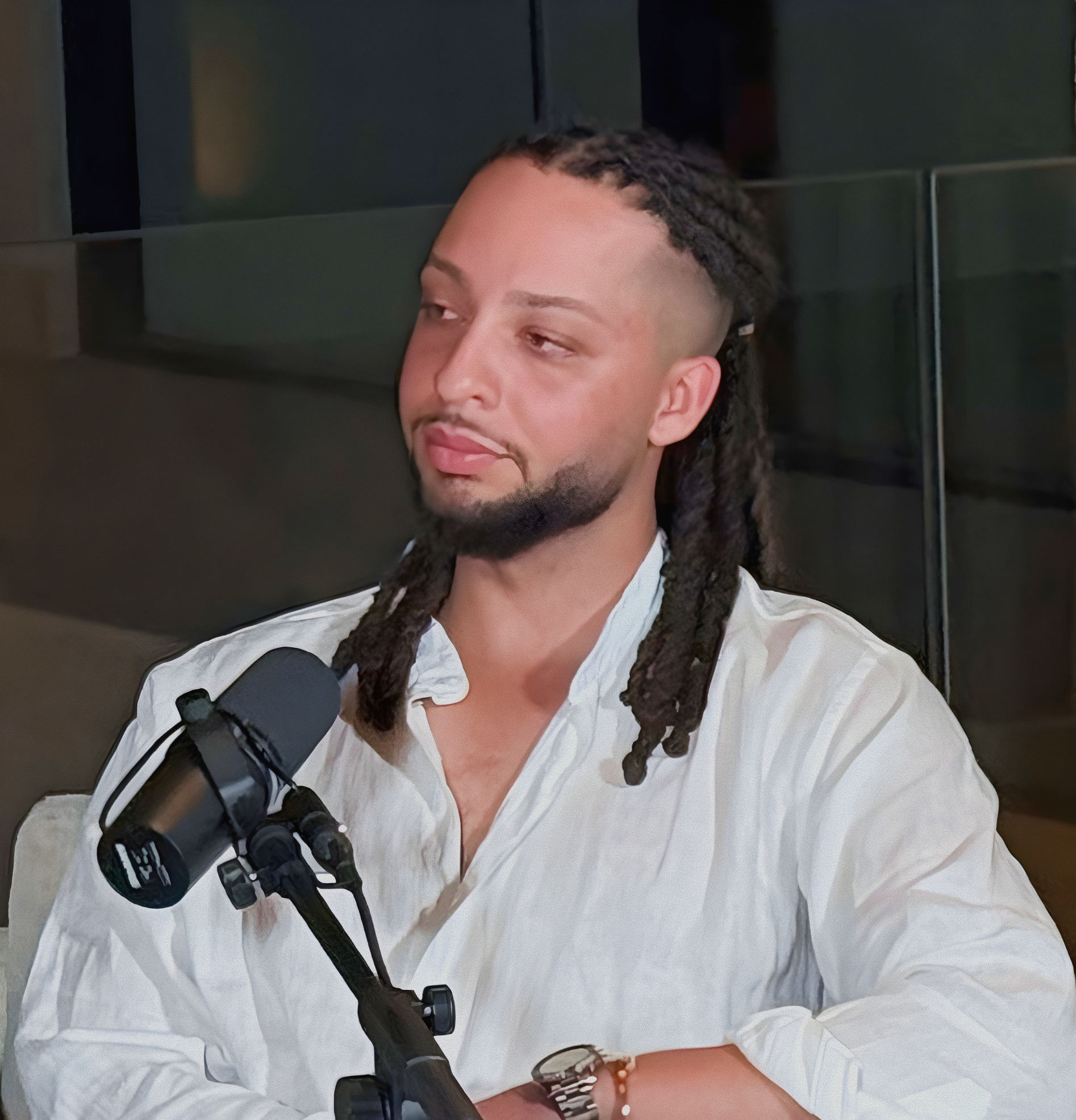
- Born: Colorado, United States
- Citizenship: United States
- Education: University of Colorado Boulder (B.A.)
- Occupation: Entrepreneur
- Awards: Letter of Commendation from the Colorado Senate (2021)

Isaiah Chavous is an American entrepreneur. He is the founder and chief executive officer of Noctal, a media technology company that uses artificial intelligence to automate sound effects creation and post-production workflows. Chavous previously served as the student body president at the University of Colorado Boulder for the 2020–21 academic year, where he co-founded the university's Center for African and African American Studies.

== Early life and education ==
Chavous was raised in Colorado Springs, Colorado. He received his early education from Rampart High School. He attended the University of Colorado Boulder, where he majored in political science with a minor in business.

== Career ==
=== Activism ===
While at the University of Colorado Boulder, Chavous was elected external student body president for the 2020–21 term, becoming the third Black student to hold the position. In this role, he oversaw a $26 million student-fee budget and led several initiatives. He co-founded the university’s Center for African and African American Studies, served on a task force to establish a permanent campus police oversight board, and led a campaign that resulted in the university reviewing its procurement contracts involving prison labor.

In the same year, Chavous received a Letter of Commendation from the Colorado State Senate for his work on police and prison reform. In November 2021, the University of Colorado Board of Regents passed a Resolution of Appreciation honoring his service as student body president, citing his dedication to underrepresented students and his roles in co-founding the Center for African and African American Studies and establishing the police oversight board.

=== Technology and entrepreneurship ===
After graduating in 2021, Chavous joined an augmented reality startup in Los Angeles, where he worked on business development for projects involving public figures such as Michael Bay, Lewis Hamilton, Snoop Dogg, and Elton John. In June 2021, he was involved in the launch of a holographic NFT art collection.

In 2023, Chavous co-founded Noctal, a company developing an AI-driven platform that analyzes video content to automatically generate and synchronize sound effects for film and video production. As CEO, he led Noctal through a seed funding round of $1.8 million in early 2025, including investments from the musician Grimes, baseball player Tony Kemp, and Caruso Ventures, managed by Dan Caruso.

== Personal life ==
Chavous is biracial and is based in Los Angeles, California. In early 2025, the apartment he resided in was destroyed by the Pacific Palisades wildfire.
