= Fibrelac =

Swiss telecommunication company

Fibre Lac SA
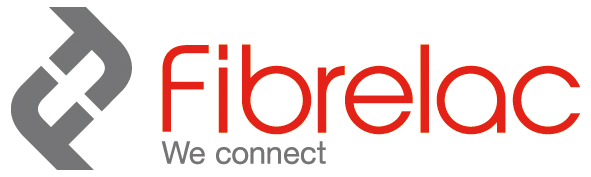
- Company type: Private
- Industry: Telecommunications
- Founded: 1998; 28 years ago
- Founders: Jacques Gamboni, Pierre Martin, Daniel Willi
- Headquarters: Vevey, Switzerland
- Key people: Olivier Crochat CEO
- Website: www.fibrelac.com

Fibrelac is a Swiss company specialized in optic-fibre-based services for professionals - companies, operators and public authorities.

== Network ==
Fibre Lac has developed and manages its own network, which represents more than 50,000 km of optical fibres along the Swiss motorways, mainly between Geneva and Zurich via Lausanne, Bern and Basle.

The Fibre Lac network access to the principal interconnection and peering points, data-processing centres, technological zones and exchange centres throughout Switzerland.

== Products ==
The company is active in the three following domains:

- Design (i.e. consultancy, design) and the construction of optical fibre networks;
- Provision and maintenance of dark fibre;
- Provision of managed services.

== History ==
1998–1999 The first job taken on by the founders, to which the Company owes its name, was the laying of an optical-fibre cable under Lake Geneva, spanning a distance of about 100 km between Geneva and Villeneuve (Vaud).

2000–2001 Fibrelac designed and built a system of tubes and chambers for optical fibres which connects Geneva, Lausanne, Bern, Basle and Zurich, following the motorway.

2002–2004 Fibrelac launched the first commercial offer for an MPLS managed band-width in Switzerland. It also extends its network up to the principal interconnection and peering points in the country.

2005–2007 Fibrelac was bought out by private Swiss interests. It filed a patent application for the design of microgroove FTTH networks.

Since 2008 Fibrelac is celebrating its first ten years, and takes this opportunity to reworks its corporate identity. The Company installed a MPLS 10 Gbit/s covering the main Swiss cities.
