= Apollo (cable system) =

Optical submarine communications cable system

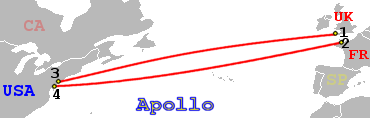
- Owners: Apollo Submarine Cable System Ltd
- Landing points: 1. (United Kingdom) Bude, Cornwall (50°50′7.8″N 4°33′9″W); 2. (France) Lannion, Brittany (48°44′47″N 3°32′50″W); 3. (United States) Shirley, New York; 4. (United States) Manasquan, New Jersey
- Total length: 13,000 km
- Topology: Two fully diverse paths
- Design capacity: over 3.2 Tbit/s per Leg
- Currently lit capacity: unknown
- Technology: Fibre Optic DWDM
- Date of first use: early 2003

Apollo is an optical submarine communications cable system crossing the Atlantic Ocean, owned by Vodafone. It consists of two segments, North and South, creating two fully diverse transatlantic paths.

In early 2006, Level 3 Communications announced its purchase of 300 Gbit/s of capacity between Apollo North and Apollo South with an option to purchase up 300 Gbit/s of future capacity. This acquisition gives Level 3 a transatlantic path that does not pass through either London or New York City, which is desirable to carriers due to network diversity concerns. This purchase represents the single largest transaction of sub-sea capacity in history without laying new cable.

== Principal access points ==
Apollo has principal access points at the following locations:

United States

- 111 8th Avenue
- 60 Hudson Street
- 165 Halsey Street
- 2100 M Street, Washington DC
- Equinix, Ashburn
- US cable stations in Shirley, New York and Manasquan, New Jersey

United Kingdom

- Telehouse West
- Global Switch
- Telecity Harbour Exchange
- Cable station in Cornwall
- Equinix, Slough

France

- Global Switch
- Interxion
- SFR Netcenter
- Telehouse 1, 2 and 3
- Equinix, Paris

== Security breach ==
In February 2018, The Sunday Times reported that the infrastructure for the UK landing site of the Apollo, GLO-1 and Europe India Gateway cables had been found almost entirely unprotected. Their reporter was able to reach the premises without being challenged, and found the door to the generator room unlocked and left ajar. Vodafone, who manage the facility, said that he had not reached critical equipment and "would not have been able to interrupt the operation of the facility."
