= MaxiCode =

Machine-readable symbol system

MaxiCode example. This encodes the string "Wikipedia, the free encyclopedia".

MaxiCode is a public-domain, machine-readable symbol system developed by Donald Chandler and Eric Batterman for United Parcel Service (UPS) in 1987. Designed for tracking and managing package shipments, it resembles an Aztec Code or QR code but uses dots in a hexagonal grid instead of square grid. It is standardized under ISO/IEC 16023.

A MaxiCode symbol—also called "Bird's Eye", "Target", "dense code", or "UPS code"—is a 1-inch square with a central bullseye surrounded by hexagonal dots. It stores about 93 characters, and up to 8 symbols can be linked to carry more data. The symmetrical bullseye aids in fast, accurate scanning, even on moving packages.

== Structured Carrier Message ==

MaxiCode symbols using modes 2 and 3 include a Structured Carrier Message containing key information about a package. This information is protected with a strong Reed–Solomon error correction code, allowing it to be read even if a portion of the symbol is damaged. These fields include:

1. A 4-bit indication of the mode in use, currently either mode 2 or mode 3.
2. A national or international postal code. MaxiCode supports both numeric postal codes (e.g. a ZIP Code), and alphanumeric postal codes.
3. A 3-digit country code encoded per ISO 3166
4. A 3-digit class of service code assigned by the carrier

The structured portion of the message is stored in the inner area of the symbol, near the bull's-eye pattern. (In modes that do not include a structured portion, the inner area simply stores the beginning of the message.)

== Application-specific information ==
Irrespective of mode, a variable amount of application-specific information can be encoded in a MaxiCode symbol. This format of this additional data is not strictly defined, and amongst other information may include:

- Purchase order number
- Customer reference
- Invoice number
- Tracking number
- Indicator of the originating carrier

== Modes ==
- Mode 0 – Obsolete; replaced by Modes 2 and 3. Older printers with outdated firmware may still produce it. Identifiable by two white horizontal hexagons in the upper right corner (black in all other modes).
- Mode 1 – Obsolete; replaced by Mode 4.
- Mode 2 – Structured Carrier Message with numeric postal code (mainly for U.S. domestic use).
- Mode 3 – Structured Carrier Message with alphanumeric postal code (mainly for international use).
- Mode 4 – Unformatted data with Standard Error Correction.
- Mode 5 – Unformatted data with Enhanced Error Correction.
- Mode 6 – Used for programming hardware devices.

UPS labels use Mode 2 or 3 MaxiCodes.
