= Lightower Fiber Networks =

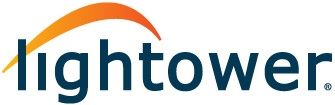
- Type: Private
- Industry: Telecommunications; IT Services
- Areas served: Northeast, Mid-Atlantic, and Midwest US, London, Toronto
- Key people: Rob Shanahan – President and Chief Executive Officer
- Parent: Crown Castle International Corp.
- Website: www.lightower.com at the Wayback Machine (archived 2017-07-16). Original

Lightower Fiber Networks, founded in 2006, was a provider of telecommunications and IT services. It offered cloud computing, colocation hosting, and connectivity.

== Description ==
The company's network spans the Northeast, Mid-Atlantic, and Midwest United States, including Connecticut, Illinois, Indiana, Kentucky, Maine, Massachusetts, Maryland, Michigan, New Jersey, New York, North Carolina, Ohio, Pennsylvania, Rhode Island, Vermont, Virginia, Washington, DC, and New Hampshire. Additionally, Lightower offers service in both Toronto and London. The network comprises over 33,000 route miles of fiber.

Lightower’s products include network and video transport, alternative access, nationwide long haul services, dark fiber, Ethernet, and cloud computing services. Lightower has built out access to over 22,000 service locations throughout the Northeast, Mid-Atlantic, and Midwest, including 275+ data centers and 5,000+ wireless towers, rooftop cell sites, and small cells.

Customers include Fortune 500 businesses, enterprise, carriers, financial services, media, healthcare, education, and government.

The company was acquired by Berkshire Partners in December 2012 when it also acquired Sidera Networks and announced plans to merge them under the Lightower brand. Its previous owners were M/C Partners and Pamlico Capital (the investing unit of Wachovia before its takeover by Wells Fargo. Those two companies had bought it from National Grid in 2007. Lightower was bought by Crown Castle in July 2017, and no longer exists as a separate company.

The company was the title sponsor of the Lightower Conference Classic, now called the Roc City Hoops Classic.

== Mergers and acquisitions ==
=== 2007 ===
- National Grid Wireless- Acquisition (NEESCom)

=== 2008 ===
- Keyspan Communications - Acquisition
- Hudson Valley DataNet - Acquisition

=== 2010 ===
- Veroxity Technology Partners - Acquisition
- Lexent Metro Connect New York City based neutral telecommunications provider that owns, operates, builds and maintains its own dark fiber network in New York, Northern New Jersey, and surrounding areas. - Acquisition
- Open Access, Inc. - Acquisition

=== 2013 ===
- Sidera Networks - Merger

=== 2015 ===
- Fibertech - Merger
- Colocation Zone - Acquisition

=== 2016 ===
- Datacenter101 - Acquisition
