= Dan Caruso =

American businessman

- Born: July 1, 1963 (age 62)
- Occupation: Investor

Dan Caruso (born July 1, 1963) is an American entrepreneur and investor. He is the co-founder, and former chairman and CEO of Zayo Group Holdings, Inc., a bandwidth infrastructure services company headquartered in Denver, Colorado.

== Career ==
Caruso began his career in 1986 as a manager at Ameritech, a telecommunications company. In 1992, Caruso joined MFS Communications, a provider of business grade telecommunication products, and served on its executive team until it was sold to WorldCom in 1996. At WorldCom, Caruso worked as senior vice president for a short time, but left in 1997 to co-found Level 3 Communications, Inc, a telecommunications and internet service provider. In 2003, Caruso left Level 3 Communications. From 2004 to 2006, Caruso was president and CEO of ICG Communications, a publicly traded telecom company with $100 million in debt. Caruso led the private buyout of ICG Communications in 2004. Over a two-year span, Caruso's team sold off the company's non-core assets for approximately $80 million and in 2006, sold ICG Communications to Level 3 Communications for $170 million, resulting in a total distribution to the buyout group and management team of over $225 million and a return on investment of 25x on the initial $8.7 million investment. In 2005, as an angel investor, Caruso helped form Envysion, a company that offers SaaS solution for video surveillance.

In 2007, Caruso, former Level 3 executive John Scarano and Matt Erickson, founded Zayo Group, a bandwidth infrastructure company that provides physical infrastructure and lit services, including dark fiber, carrier-neutral colocation, mobile infrastructure, wavelengths, Ethernet and IP services. Under Caruso's leadership, Zayo has acquired 34 companies and expanded its fiber network to more than 82,000 route miles across the United States and Europe. On October 17, 2014, Zayo completed its initial public offering (IPO) on the New York Stock Exchange. A total of 21.1 million shares of Zayo became public stock; 16 million shares of company stock Zayo Group sold and the 5 million shares sold by its investors. Shares of the company closed at $22, up $3 from its opening price of $19 per share.

In 2025, he authored the book Bandwidth: The Untold Story of Ambition, Deception, and Innovation that Shaped the Internet Age and Dot-Com Boom.

== Board of directors ==
From 2006 to 2011, Caruso served as a director of New Global Telecom's board, a company that provided Broadsoft-based hosted VoIP services to the cable industry. From 2009 to 2011, Caruso served as a board member of GTS Central Europe, a fiber based telecom provider in Poland, Czech Republic, Slovakia, and Hungary. From 2006 to 2013, Caruso served as chairman of Envysion's board.

== Education ==
Caruso graduated with a Bachelor of Science in Mechanical Engineering from the University of Illinois and an MBA from the University of Chicago.

== Awards ==
In 2009, Caruso was named Entrepreneur of the Year in the Rocky Mountain Region by Ernst & Young. In 2010, Caruso earned The Boulder Chamber of Commerce Esprit Award honors as an Entrepreneur of Distinction. In 2011, Caruso was named a finalist for the Ernst & Young National Entrepreneur of the Year Award in the category of Media, Entertainment and Communications and was selected as one of the Eleven Colorado Business People to Watch by The Denver Post. In 2013, Caruso was awarded the Bob Newman Lifetime Achievement Award at the Colorado Technology Association APEX awards. In 2015, Caruso was presented with a Gold Stevie® Award in the Executive of the Year in the Telecommunications category at The 13th Annual American Business Awards.
