= Greg Maffei =

American businessman (born 1960)

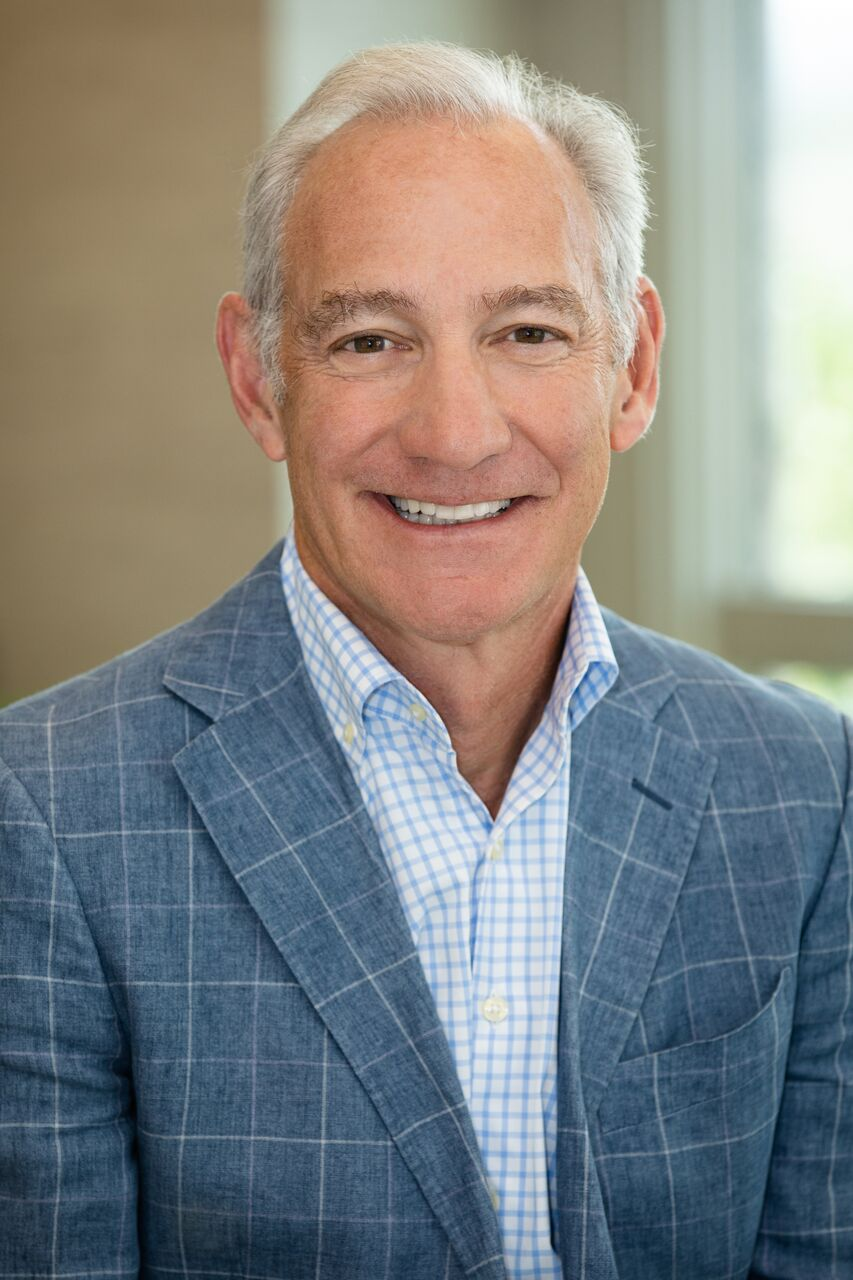
- Born: Gregory Ben Maffei; May 24, 1960 (age 66)
- Education: Dartmouth College (BA); Harvard University (MBA)
- Occupation: Businessman
- Political party: Republican

Gregory Ben Maffei (born May 24, 1960) is an American businessman. He is the former president and chief executive officer of Liberty Media and the chairman of QVC Group, SiriusXM, and Tripadvisor. He is the former chairman of Live Nation, Starz and Expedia, as well as the former chief financial officer of Oracle and Microsoft.

== Early life and education ==
Maffei was born on May 24, 1960. He attended Groton School, received an AB from Dartmouth College and an MBA from Harvard Business School, where he was a Baker Scholar.

== Business career ==
Maffei joined Liberty Media in 2005. He was its president and CEO. Liberty Media owns media, communications and entertainment businesses, including subsidiaries Formula One Group, SiriusXM, the Atlanta Braves, and an interest in Live Nation Entertainment. Maffei was also president and CEO of Liberty Broadband Corporation, which consists primarily of a stake in Charter Communications, and is chairman and CEO of Liberty Tripadvisor, which holds a controlling interest in Tripadvisor. Liberty Broadband and Liberty Tripadvisor were spun off from Liberty Media and Liberty Interactive, respectively, in 2014. In addition, Maffei is executive chairman of QVC Group, which owns digital commerce businesses, including subsidiaries HSN, Zulily, and the Cornerstone Brands.

He also is a director of Zillow. Maffei has been leading the team in transforming these companies to compete in the digital/mobile era alongside Chairman John C. Malone.

Maffei was vice chair of the Board of Trustees of Dartmouth College and was chair of the finance committee, and is a member of the Council on Foreign Relations. He previously was president of the board of trustees of the Seattle Public Library.

Prior to joining Liberty Media, Maffei was president and CFO of Oracle for only four months in 2005. He was chairman, president and CEO of 360networks. Maffei became CFO of Microsoft in 1997 and resigned in 1999. He was chairman of Expedia from 1999 to 2002. Maffei was the chairman of Starz and a director of Barnes & Noble, Charter Communications, Citrix, DIRECTV, Dorling Kindersley, Electronic Arts. He left the Starbucks board of directors in 2006.

== Controversies ==
Mario Andretti says that at the 2024 Miami Grand Prix he was having a private conversation with Formula One CEO Stefano Domenicali about his son Michael Andretti's bid to join the F1 grid for 2025 being denied controversially, when Maffei butted in and said "Mario, I want to tell you that I will do everything in my power to see that Michael never enters Formula 1." With their collusion against Andretti becoming a matter of public record, Liberty subsequently disclosed that the United States Department of Justice has opened a probe into Formula One Management (owned by Liberty Media) for rejecting Andretti's bid to join Formula One, citing anti-competitive practices. Pascal Arimont urged the EU investigate, as well, ahead of Liberty Global's purchase of MotoGP.

== Personal life ==
Maffei lives in Colorado with his wife and children.

He donated $250,000 to Donald Trump's inauguration committee.
