= AboveNet =

US company

- Founded: 1993; 33 years ago
- Defunct: July 2, 2012; 14 years ago
- Fate: Acquired by Zayo Group
- Headquarters: White Plains, New York
- Revenue: ▲$472 million (2011)
- Net income: ▲$72 million (2011)
- Total assets: ▲$911 million (2011)
- Total equity: ▲$647 million (2011)
- Number of employees: 713 (2011)

AboveNet was a provider of high bandwidth telecommunication circuits primarily for large corporate enterprises and communications carriers in 17 markets in the United States and 4 markets in Europe. Its private optical network delivered key network and IP services and was used in financial and legal services, media, health care, retail, and government.

The company was formerly named Metromedia Fiber Network and changed its name to AboveNet in 2003 after emerging from bankruptcy.

Before its bankruptcy in 2002, the company was financially backed by John Kluge and Verizon.

In 2012, the company was acquired by Zayo Group for $2.2 billion in cash.

== History ==
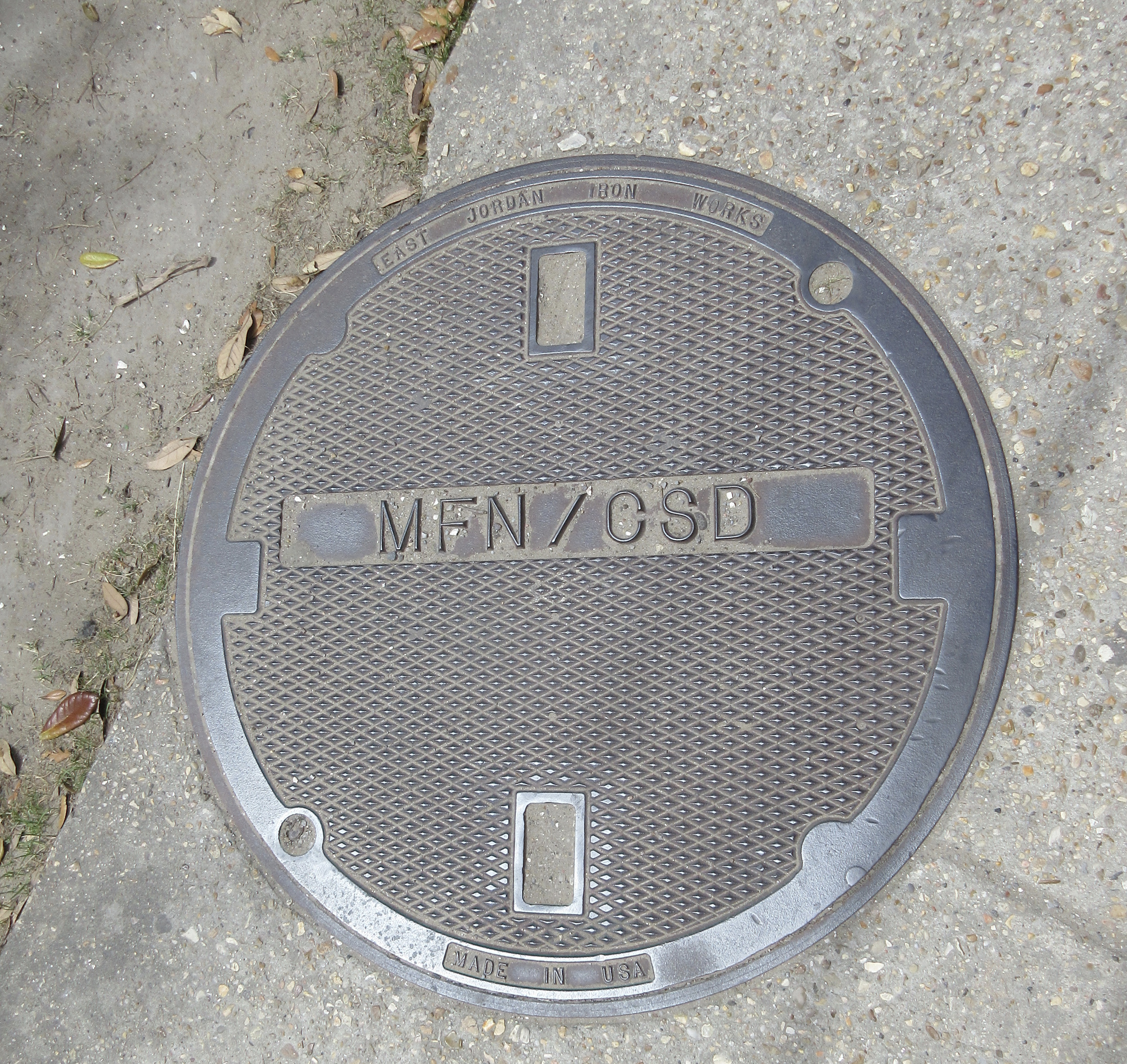
Metromedia Fiber Network manhole cover, Uptown New Orleans.

The company was founded in 1993 as AboveNet, by founder Sherman Tuan. It initially focused on 'one-hop' internet connectivity and providing dark fiber to communications carrier customers in the U.S. and Europe.

Abovenet Communications became a public company via an initial public offering in December 1998 and soared 32% in one day in March 1999 during the dot-com bubble after announcing a stock split.

In June 1999, Metromedia acquired Abovenet Communications, including its subsidiary PAIX, an operator of Internet peering exchanges. Following the acquisition, the company changed its name to Metromedia Fiber Network in 2000.

In 2000, the company acquired M.I.B.H., a networking consultancy operated by Paul Vixie, for $51 million in cash and stock.

Also in 2000, Verizon invested $970 million in convertible bonds and $715.4 million in common stock of the company.

In 2001, the company acquired SiteSmith, a provider of managed web-hosting services, for $1.36 billion in stock.

In May 2002, the company filed bankruptcy.

In September 2003, the company emerged from bankruptcy and changed its name to Abovenet, with Craig McCaw, Franklin Mutual Advisers, and John Kluge among its largest shareholders.

In October 2006, Digital Realty acquired the east coast data centers of the company for $40 million.

In 2007, the company acquired fiber from AT&T and Verizon that the companies were selling to comply with antitrust law.

On July 2, 2012, Zayo Group, an American communications company, acquired AboveNet for $2.2 billion in cash.
