= 111 Eighth Avenue =

Mixed-use building in Manhattan, New York

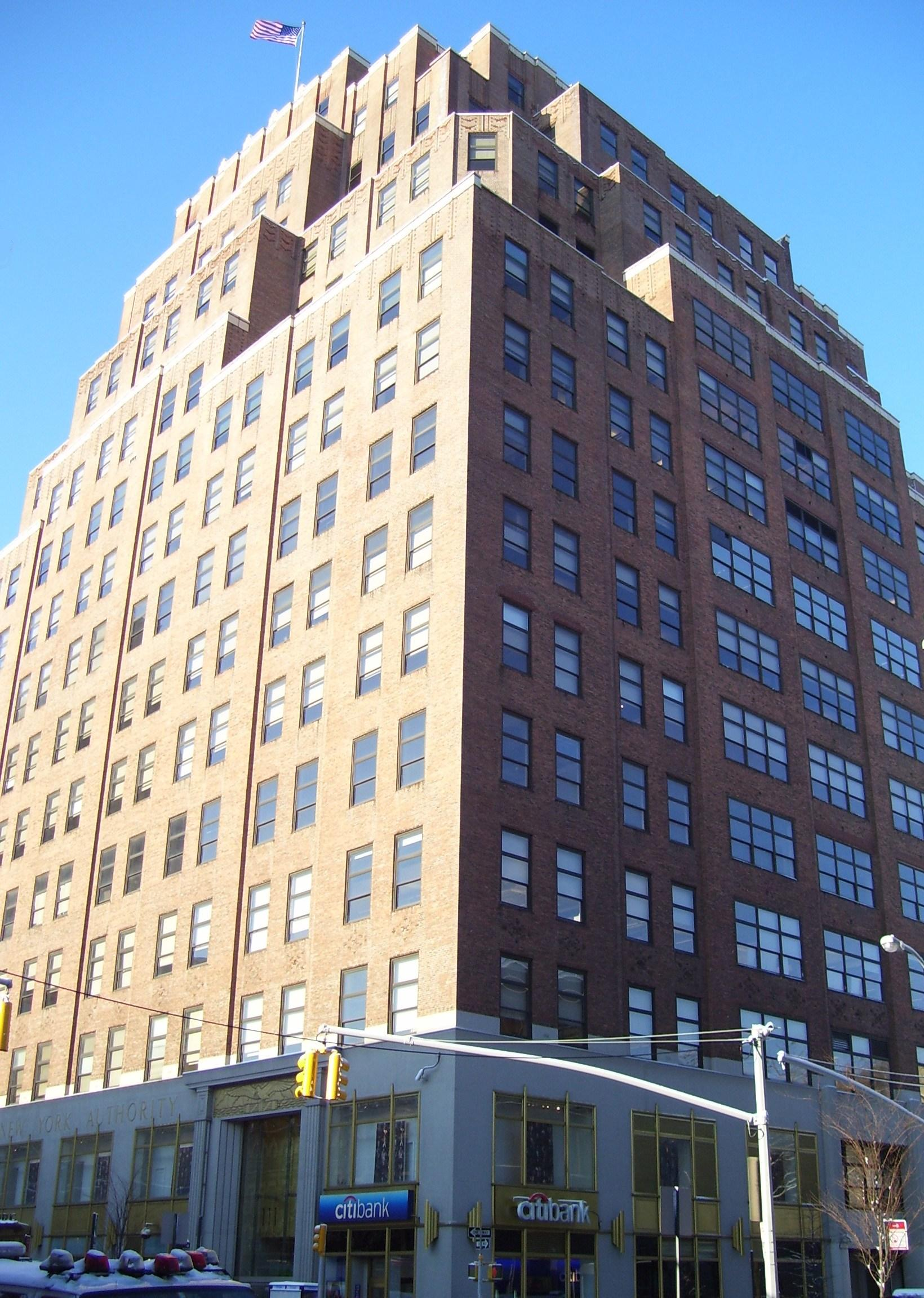
- Eighth Avenue façade of 111 Eighth Avenue in 2011
- Former names: Union Inland Terminal #1; Port Authority Building

General information
- Type: Multi-use
- Architectural style: Art Deco
- Location: Chelsea, Manhattan, 111 Eighth Avenue, New York City, New York, United States
- Coordinates: 40°44′29″N 74°0′11″W
- Current tenants: Google
- Completed: 1932
- Owner: Google

Technical details
- Floor count: 15
- Floor area: 2,900,000 square feet (270,000 m^{2})

Design and construction
- Architect: Lusby Simpson
- Architecture firm: Abbott, Merkt & Co.

111 Eighth Avenue, also known as the Google Building and formerly known as Union Inland Terminal #1 and the Port Authority Building, is an Art Deco building in the Chelsea neighborhood of Manhattan in New York City, United States. The 15-story, mixed-use building occupies an entire city block and has 2.9 million square feet (270,000 m^{2}) of floor space, more than the Empire State Building.

The Port of New York Authority began acquiring the land on the building's site in 1930, against the protests of local residents. It was completed in 1932 and served as an inland terminal for the Hudson River piers and as a warehousing and industrial facility. Occupancy fell to 50 percent in the 1970s due to the decline of industrial activity in Manhattan, and the Port Authority itself moved to the World Trade Center in 1973. In the 1990s the building began to attract tenants in the technology and telecommunications sectors. In 2010, the building was purchased for $1.8 billion by Google, who became its largest tenant; Google's presence helped attract other technology companies to Chelsea and contributed to the neighborhood's ongoing gentrification. Aside from Google, the building is also home to a cancer treatment center and a black box theater.

== Description ==
111 Eighth Avenue occupies the full city block between Eighth and Ninth Avenues and 15th and 16th Streets in the Chelsea neighborhood of Manhattan in New York City, United States. The building, completed in 1932, was designed by Lusby Simpson of Abbott, Merkt & Co. The building is 15 stories tall and has 2.9 million square feet (270,000 m^{2}) of floor space, more than the Empire State Building; (Note: Other sources give the floor area as 2.3 million square feet (210,000 m^{2}), 2.5 million square feet (230,000 m^{2}), or 2.6 million square feet (240,000 m^{2}).) the individual floors are nearly 4 acres (1.6 ha) in area and have 14.5-foot (4.4 m) ceilings. It has a rooftop helipad and penthouse floors on either end of the building.

Its exterior is in the Art Deco style and features recurring seagull motifs. The walls are largely made of brick, with granite bases; the first two stories are limestone, and copings and finials are of terracotta. Because of the warehouse mission of the building, it was able to avoid some of the setback rules that greatly reduced the buildable space available for the skyscrapers that mark the Manhattan skyline.

=== Features ===
==== Original use ====
The building had a multipurpose design when it opened in 1932, with the first floor and basement designated as "Union Inland Terminal #1", which was to be used to transport goods by truck to and from railroad lines and shipping piers on the Hudson River. Cargo was dropped off along 15th Street, sorted inside the building, and picked up from the 16th Street side. The building included four truck elevators, each of which had a 40,000-pound (18,000 kg; 20-short-ton) capacity and could travel at up to 200 ft/min (61 m/min). These elevators measured 17 by 34 feet (5.2 by 10.4 m) across, and they lifted trucks into pits measuring 3.5 feet (1.1 m) deep and 38 by 90 feet (12 by 27 m) across. There were also 12 package elevators and 18 passenger elevators. Freight companies used the elevators to deliver cargo directly to tenants, in contrast to other industrial buildings in New York City, where cargo was dropped off at ground level.

The second floor contained Commerce Hall, designed for exhibitions. The upper floors were intended for manufacturing. Each floor covered 165,000 ft^{2} (15,300 m^{2}). There were 16 loading docks on each floor. On the 15th floor, which contained the Port Authority's offices, engineer Aymar Embury II designed a 325-seat auditorium decorated in green and blue. The New York Herald Tribune said was the "first auditorium designed for commercial purposes in a strictly commercial structure".

==== Current use ====
The building's design retains vestiges of its original industrial purpose, including truck-sized freight elevators and floors built to support heavy loads. As of 2008, two of its original truck elevators were still in use, in addition to nine other large freight elevators and fourteen passenger elevators. The floors of the two lobbies originally each had a large bronze seal of the Port Authority embedded in them; one of these was removed and converted into a coffee table as a retirement gift for Port Authority director Austin J. Tobin. It is also noted for its unobstructed views of the Manhattan skyline. The building has direct access to the 14th Street/Eighth Avenue station of the New York City Subway; when the building opened, a staircase at 15th Street and Eighth Avenue led directly to the subway station in the basement.

== History ==
=== Union Inland Terminal #1 and Port Authority Commerce Building ===
By the early twentieth century, the West Side of Manhattan was plagued with heavy traffic because of the tangle of street-level passenger and freight trains on the West Side Line, cargo unloading from the busy Hudson River piers, and the lack of suitable warehouse facilities. The situation led the Port of New York Authority to commission the construction of a large inland terminal at 111 Eighth Avenue. It was designed to alleviate the traffic problem by streamlining the distribution of goods within a single location. Instead of cargo being picked up directly at the piers, it would be brought to the building to be consolidated, where trucks could pick up all their cargo in a single stop. A concurrent project, the West Side Improvement Project, replaced the West Side Line with the original High Line elevated railway, which ran a few blocks away from 111 Eighth Avenue; it began full operation in 1934.

==== Construction ====
In May 1930, the Port Authority and all of the railroads in the Port of New York agreed to build a "union inland freight terminal" between Eighth Avenue, 15th Street, Ninth Avenue, and 16th Street. The terminal was planned to cost $15 million and would include office space, as well as large driveways and about 7 acres (28,000 m^{2}; 300,000 ft^{2}) for sorting freight. The structure was to be known as Inland Terminal No. 1 because the Port Authority hoped that similar freight terminals would be constructed across the city. At the time of the announcement, the Port Authority already owned half of the block, which it had acquired for $1.5 million. Most of the block had been occupied by houses, except for a factory in the middle of the block on 15th Street. The New York City Board of Estimate approved the proposed terminal's site in June 1930. The Port Authority acquired additional land on the building's site throughout the rest of the year, despite the protests of local residents. By October 1930, the Port Authority had bought 85 percent of the site and was preparing to acquire the remaining buildings through condemnation.

A contract for the demolition of existing structures was awarded in December 1930. Twelve railroads signed an agreement with the Port Authority to use the new terminal at the beginning of January 1931, and contractors immediately began razing the site. The Godwin Construction Company was contracted in April 1931 to excavate the site and construct the building's foundations. A groundbreaking ceremony for the freight terminal, attended by New York State governor Franklin D. Roosevelt, took place on April 30, 1931. That September, the Port Authority received bids for the construction of the building's superstructure; the Turner Construction Company submitted a low bid of $7.591 million. Construction required 120,000 cubic yards of concrete, 65 miles of piping, and 12 million bricks, as well as 160,000 barrels of cement. The Port Authority also paid to widen the streets on all four sides.

Four hundred railroad managers were invited to inspect the new terminal on September 9, 1932. Inland Terminal No. 1 was formally dedicated the next week, September 16, though the building was not at that time fully completed. At the time it was the largest building in New York City. The building ultimately cost $16 million; the superstructure alone cost $8 million to $9 million. Shippers and consignees began using a 265,000-square-foot (24,600 m^{2}) freight terminal on the basement and first floor on October 3, 1932. Only the basement and ground story were open at the time; the upper stories, intended for light manufacturing, were not expected to be completed until the end of the year. Real-estate experts cited Inland Terminal No. 1 as one of several developments that were contributing to the growth of businesses in Chelsea. The final dedication of the building occurred on February 25, 1933, with a ceremony attended by Port Authority, New York City, and New York state officials. A banquet was held in one of the building's truck elevators to mark its dedication.

==== Opening and early years ====
Tenants had begun moving into the upper stories even before the building's dedication. By the beginning of 1933, eight hundred shipping firms were using the terminal to ship outbound freight, while fifty shippers received inbound freight there. Upon the building's opening, the Port Authority leased the terminal to the New York Central Railroad, the Pennsylvania Railroad, the Lehigh Valley Railroad, the Erie Railroad, the Baltimore & Ohio Railroad, the Lackawanna Railroad, the New York, New Haven & Hartford Railroad, and the Central Railroad of New Jersey. Each railroad paid the Port Authority ten cents for every 1 short ton (0.89 long tons; 0.91 t) of freight handled at the terminal. The terminal was to be used by all shippers in Manhattan between Houston Street to the south and 23rd Street to the north. At the time of construction it was estimated to be capable of handling one-third of the 680,000 annual tons of less-than-carload freight at the port. Among the terminal's tenants during the 1930s were the Woolworth Company, Rand McNally, the New York Trust Company, and offices of the Works Progress Administration.

The Port Authority hired Caldwell, Garvan & Bettini in October 1933 to construct a lobby, stair, and foyer for Commerce Hall on the building's second floor. Commerce Hall opened on December 8, 1933, with an exhibit of Ford Motor Company vehicles. The terminal saw early success in reducing truck traffic to and from the railheads. For instance, on May 25, 1936, 250 trucks brought cargo to the building that was consolidated into only 37 trucks to take to the ferry terminals. Commerce Hall hosted the National Business Show for several years in the 1930s. By February 1938, all of the building's space had been rented, despite the ongoing Great Depression. After Commerce Hall was closed in 1938, the floor was converted to regular commercial use.

==== 1940s to early 1970s ====
The Board of Estimate approved an agreement in 1940, in which the Port Authority would make annual $60,000 payments in lieu of taxes on the building. The building remained 95 percent occupied at the time. Its tenants during the early 1940s included Sears, Roebuck and Company, as well as a regional office for the Second Corps Area. In spite of a decline in freight traffic during World War II, the Port Authority retained a good credit rating and, by 1945, had drawn up plans for two new freight terminals in the New York metropolitan area. The Port Authority's 1949 report noted a significant decrease in freight handling at the building due to an overall shift in Manhattan from rail to trucks for transporting goods. Around this time, the Port Authority constructed additional inland terminals intended for truck traffic: the New York Union Motor Truck Terminal in 1949 and the Newark Union Motor Truck Terminal in 1950.

The Port Authority began erecting a helipad on the building's roof in November 1950, and the helipad opened on May 31, 1951. It was the site of an accident on July 13, 1955, when a Bell 47 helicopter operated by the Port Authority crashed shortly after take-off and fell, in flames, onto the fifteenth floor, where it became stuck. The pilot and his only passenger survived with injuries. The last of the railroad companies left the building in 1963. The shipping and manufacturing industries in Chelsea declined significantly during the 1960s, as firms moved from the neighborhood to elsewhere in the New York metropolitan area. The building remained the Port Authority's headquarters until the agency moved to the new World Trade Center in 1973.

=== Sylvan Lawrence ownership ===
The Port Authority sold 111 Eighth Avenue to Realopco Inc. – a company operated by brothers Sylvan Lawrence and Seymour Cohn, who also led the Sylvan Lawrence Company – for $24 million in July 1973. The owners added a CCTV system, replaced existing manually operated elevators with 12 automatic elevators, and refurbished the lobby, and they received a $25 million mortgage from Chase Manhattan Bank. The building had a 40 percent vacancy rate in 1975, a figure that increased the next year to 50 percent. This was attributed to the decline of manufacturing in New York City and the ongoing national recession; in addition, several tenants had vacated large blocks of space, including Interstate Stores and Atlantic Department Stores. Mayor Abraham Beame proposed that the vacant space be leased to garment manufacturers, but many garment firms were loath to relocate. After the Sorg Printing Company leased some of the vacant space, the occupancy rate increased to 75 percent by January 1977. Occupancy had rebounded to 90 percent by 1979.

Following Lawrence's death in 1981, Seymour Cohn and Lawrence's widow Alice each acquired a 50 percent stake in 111 Eighth Avenue. Cohn and Alice Lawrence were unable to agree on what to do with 111 Eighth Avenue and three other buildings, leading to a protracted legal struggle. During the 1980s and 1990s, the building attracted a number of a tenants in the computer industry, who were drawn by the large floor space. In addition, numerous companies had moved their back office operations to 111 Eighth Avenue by the early 1980s. The building was 80 percent occupied in 1992, with space renting at $8 to $18 per square foot ($86 to $194/m^{2}). By the late 1990s, the building was 87 percent occupied, and Sylvan Lawrence had leased out 200,000 square feet (19,000 m^{2}) during the preceding year. The building's largest tenants at the time included Citibank, the New York State Insurance Fund, and Prudential Securities. The massive building served as a dwindling warehouse and back-office outpost through the end of the 1990s.

=== Taconic acquisition ===
Cohn and Alice Lawrence agreed to sell off 111 Eighth Avenue and Lawrence's other three buildings in 1997. Blackacre Capital Group and Taconic Investment Partners agreed to acquire the four buildings in November 1997 for $387 million; the sale was finalized in January 1998. Taconic marketed 111 Eighth Avenue as a carrier hotel for the new booming internet business, as the building had high ceilings, large floor plates, multiple fiber-optic connections, and five times the electrical capacity that typical tenants required. This was coupled with the fashionable rise of the Chelsea neighborhood that surrounded it. Taconic began a $50 million renovation, replacing the building's wiring. One-third of the space was leased to telecommunications companies and another one-third to advertising agencies and internet companies. The new occupants could afford higher rents than the old industrial tenants. 111 Eighth Avenue's new tenants also contributed to the gentrification of the surrounding neighborhood; as Crain's New York wrote in 1999: "The building's advertising and Internet professionals provide a natural market for lunch and nighttime eateries."

Although Taconic tried to screen potential telecommunications tenants by establishing strict net-worth requirements, so many companies expressed interest in the building that Taconic had stopped accepting new telecommunications tenants by late 1999. Average rents had more than doubled during the preceding two years, from $18 to $46 per square foot ($190 to $500/m^{2}). A 70,000-square-foot (6,500 m^{2}) cancer treatment center, designed by Gwathmey Siegel & Associates Architects and operated by St. Vincent's Hospital, opened in the building the same year. The Eighth and Ninth Avenue lobbies were renovated in 2000 and 2004, respectively. During the Northeast blackout of 2003, the building was able to keep power on, thanks to an underground fuel tank and 37 generators.

In 2006, the Atlantic Theater Company opened a 99-seat black box theater in the building, and Lifetime Entertainment Services became its first cable television tenant. Google opened its largest engineering office outside of California in the building in 2006, leasing 300,000 square feet (28,000 m^{2}) across three floors. The Google workspace was noted for its campus-like and playful atmosphere, with perks including free food and a game room; The New York Times described it as "a vision of a workplace utopia as conceived by rich, young, single engineers in Silicon Valley, transplanted to Manhattan".

=== Google ownership ===
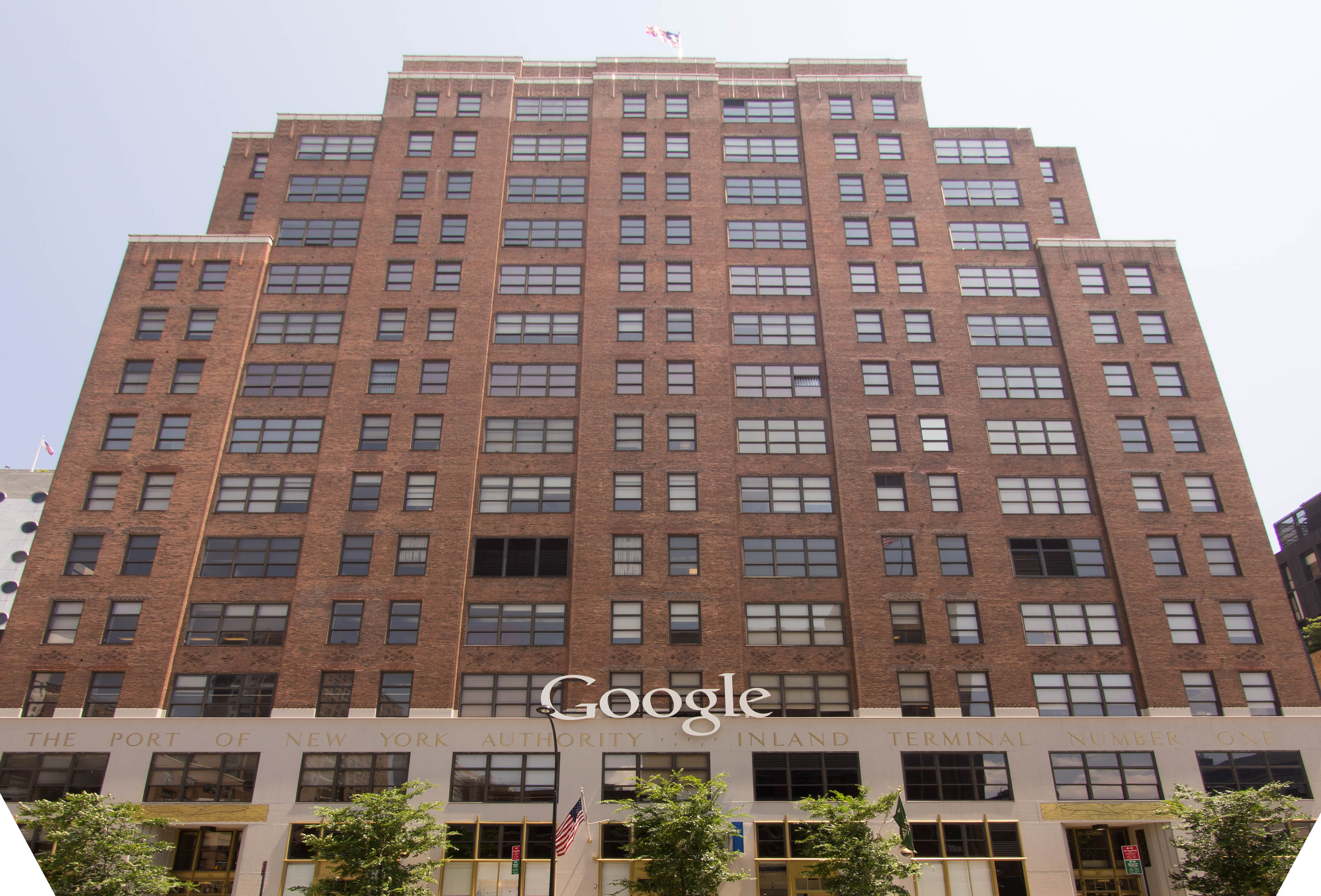
The old Google corporate logo on Ninth Avenue

In 2010, Google contracted to purchase the entire building from Taconic, in a deal reported to be worth around $1.8 billion, the biggest purchase of a U.S. office building of the year. The deal was credited with helping revive the New York City commercial real estate market, which had slumped during the Great Recession. After the purchase, Google was the largest tenant, with 500,000 square feet (46,000 m^{2}) of the building. Taconic continued to manage the building under contract from Google. Since its acquisition, the building has become popularly known as the "Google Building", and it is regarded as the company's East Coast headquarters.

111 Eighth Avenue is adjacent to trunk fiber optic lines stretching from Hudson Street and continuing up Ninth Avenue. That line at the time was owned by Lexent Metro Connect. There was speculation at the time of the acquisition that Google would use its strategic location to launch a Google Fiber operation in New York City. The Google Fiber plan never came to pass, and Google has denied it has any plans to bring it to New York City anytime in the near future, although in 2013 it did begin offering free Wi-Fi to its Chelsea neighbors. The Lexent dark fiber line has been acquired by Lightower Fiber Networks. The building's meet-me room in its carrier hotel was one of the main network interconnections in the city as of 2006.

In 2013 the first class of the newly created Cornell NYC Tech school began classes in the building, in space donated by Google. Classes continued in the building until the school moved to its new location on Roosevelt Island in 2017. Despite the massive size of the acquisition, Google has still found itself having to rent space elsewhere because it has been unable to break the leases with some of its tenants, including Nike, Deutsch Inc., and Bank of New York. After years of renting additional space across the street in the Chelsea Market, Google purchased that building in 2018.

Google's expansion in Chelsea helped attract other technology companies to the area and contributed to gentrification. The New York Times described Google as drawing "relatively few complaints" in the neighborhood, and New York City Council speaker Corey Johnson called the company "a good neighbor", although some residents blamed it for changing the neighborhood's character and driving out smaller businesses.

== See also ==
- 1932 in architecture
- Art Deco architecture of New York City
- List of buildings, sites, and monuments in New York City
