= Savvis =

Subsidiary of CenturyLink, a company headquartered in Monroe, Louisiana

- Type: Subsidiary
- Industry: Information Technology
- Founded: 1995; 31 years ago
- Headquarters: Town and Country, Missouri, United States
- Key people: Jeffrey H. Von Deylen (president)
- Products: IT services including Cloud, managed hosting, colocation and network services
- Revenue: US$933 million (2010)
- Operating income: US$24.5 million (2010)
- Net income: US$53.9 million (2010)
- Number of employees: 2,440 (as of December 31, 2010)
- Parent: Lumen Technologies (2011-present)
- ASN: 3561
- Peering policy: Restrictive
- Traffic Levels: 100+ Gb/s
- Website: www.savvis.com

Savvis is a subsidiary of Lumen Technologies (formerly CenturyLink) that sells managed hosting and colocation services headquartered in Town and Country, Missouri. The company owns more than 50 data centers spread across North America, Europe, and Asia and provides information technology consulting. Savvis has approximately 2,500 unique business and government customers.

== Early history ==
Savvis was founded in November 1995 under the name DiamondNet by CTO/COO Timothy Munro Roberts and CEO Andrew Gladney. The two met in the St. Louis area in 1994 where both lived, with Roberts working for a computer store and Gladney as a customer. Gladney provided the initial capital ($600,000 to $1 million, according to different sources) in return for a 75% stake in the startup, with Roberts’ stake being the remaining 25%.

Gary Zimmerman was recruited by Roberts from SBC Communications Inc. to become vice president of engineering at Savvis in November 1995. He built out Robert's first national network design. The authentic network design was unique within the industry at the time it became fully operational, and there was significant coverage and discussion in the trade press regarding both the network and its architect, Roberts. In 2001, the last year in which Robert's original design was in use, Savvis was ranked the #1 fastest Backbone Network by Keynote Systems, an independent network ratings service.

Roberts closed a revenue contract with Apple Computer, Inc. as their first large customer, dealing with David Zimmerman and Marty Suzuki at Apple's Cupertino headquarters. By leveraging the Apple Computer customer reference and testimonials, the company was able to close additional large contracts with other industry providers, and it quickly gained wide industry recognition.

During this growth spurt, the company attracted the notice of St. Louis' Gateway Venture Partners, who subsequently invested millions of dollars. After the Gateway investment, Sam Sanderson, former CEO of Rogers Cable, was brought to helm the company. Sanderson brought much needed support to the company, closing substantial contracts and placing the company into a marketing position. Contemporaneously, Bob Murphy was named to the chief financial officer position (Murphy was previously the CFO of Williams Communications). Murphy in turn attracted additional capital, and a sound financial management team.

In 1997, Roberts left the company, and Gladney left his position as CEO to become vice chairman. Gladney's relationship with Savvis ended shortly thereafter in 1999. By the time of the company's IPO (in 2000), Gladney's stake was 1% of the outstanding shares.

== Growth and acquisitions ==
In 1999 Savvis was acquired by Bridge Information Systems. After a year as a Bridge Company, Savvis was spun off by Bridge as a public company. Savvis' February 2000 initial public offering (IPO) was listed on the NASDAQ stock exchange as "SVVS". Since its IPO, Savvis has grown both organically and through strategic acquisitions. In 2002, Savvis purchased WAM!NET, a content management and media application service, followed in 2003 by a purchase of the hosting operation and customers of Intel Online Services. In 2004 the company purchased the assets of Cable & Wireless America which included 15 data centers and the customers of Exodus Communications, the Tier-1 Internet backbone previously owned by MCI, the content delivery network (CDN) from Digital Island, and a significant professional services organization for $155 million in cash and assumed liabilities of approximately $12.5 million.

=== Name change ===
In 2005, Savvis announced a change in its name from Savvis Communications Corporation to Savvis, Inc. to reflect company expansion from network services to Global IT services. Until January 21, 2014, Savvis was referred to as Savvis, a CenturyLink company, an autonomous managed-hosting entity under the CenturyLink umbrella. In early 2014, the company name was changed to CenturyLink Technology Solutions, in order to better align the Savvis business unit and the CenturyLink parent company. In early 2015 CenturyLink Technology Solutions was fully absorbed within CenturyLink's IT Services group, it is now unified under one name "CenturyLink".

=== Content delivery network divestitures ===
In 2006, Savvis announced that Level 3 Communications would acquire Savvis’ content delivery network (CDN) services business for $135 million; the deal included network assets, customer contracts and intellectual property used in Savvis’ CDN business.

=== Expanding EMEA presence ===
In 2007, Savvis opened a data center in Singapore, increasing its presence in the Asia Pacific region. The following year, it opened a new data center in London, increasing its services in Europe.

=== Acquisition of Fusepoint ===
In June 2010, Savvis acquired Canadian technology firm Fusepoint, including data centers in Toronto, Montreal and Vancouver.

=== Recovery ===
In January 2011, Savvis was positioned in the Leaders quadrant of the Magic Quadrant for Cloud Infrastructure-as-a-Service and Web Hosting (2010 Edition) by Gartner, an IT research and advisory firm. Savvis is positioned alongside 19 other web hosting providers, including AT&T, Rackspace, Verizon Business, Terremark, and Sungard in the measurement of "completeness of vision" and "ability to execute". As well, the company launched its global, cloud-focused Savvis Alliances Program for channel partners. Savvis also entered into partnership with Bharti Airtel Limited to launch a major strategic managed hosting and cloud computing initiative in India.

=== Acquisition by CenturyLink ===
On April 27, 2011, telecommunications firm CenturyLink, Inc. and Savvis reached an agreement whereby CenturyLink acquired Savvis through a buyout of outstanding common shares in cash and stocks, for approximately $2.5 billion USD. This valued Savvis at $40 per share, which represented an 11% premium over Savvis’ closing price on April 26, 2011. Under the agreement, Savvis shareholders are to receive $30 per share in cash and $10 in shares of CenturyLink common stock. In September 2011, Savvis announced facility expansions in existing markets including Atlanta, Boston, and Toronto; as well as the opening of 2 new data centers in Seattle and Piscataway, New Jersey. This adds 100,000 square feet of raised data center floor space in the 5 cities, bringing the total sellable global footprint to 2 million square feet.

== Controversy ==
=== Spam support allegations ===
On September 8, 2004, Savvis' Operations Security Manager, Alif Terranson, left his position and went public with internal Savvis documents, releasing them to media outlets including the BBC, the Register, and others. These documents disclosed that Savvis was soliciting the business of spammers and that Savvis was realizing between $200,000 to $2,000,000 in per month from these customers. As a result of the negative media attention, Savvis resumed business using Spamhaus (a worldwide organization of spam fighters) to prevent and resolve customer spam issues. In a joint press release, Steve Linford, CEO and founder of the Spamhaus Project was quoted, "Spamhaus has long recognized Savvis as a 'White Hat Network' with exemplary policies and procedures to control the proliferation of spam. We are pleased to work with Savvis to fight against spam and encourage others in the industry to adopt their leadership model."

=== American Express lawsuit ===
In October 2005, then CEO Robert A McCormick and Savvis were listed as defendants in a claim brought by American Express. The case involved charges made on McCormick's corporate American Express Card that were reported to be $241,000 at a New York strip club, Scores. While McCormick asserted that the charges were fraudulent, Scores claimed to have fingerprints of McCormick's, used specifically to verify that his large charges were legitimate. In November 2005, after an investigation into the matter by the audit committee of the board of directors, Savvis accepted McCormick's resignation. Jeff Von Deylen was the only Savvis Executive at Scores who kept his role at the company. He now leads Chicago-based, Ensono. In March 2006, Savvis announced that the litigation brought by American Express against Savvis, McCormick and Scores had been resolved in a negotiated settlement.

=== Suits over security audits ===
In 2009, multiple lawsuits were filed against Savvis alleging that Savvis improperly certified as compliant with credit card security standards processors, which may have resulted in significant security breaches. An analysis of one complaint reported: "According to a post-incident forensic analysis, at the time Savvis issued the [certification], CardSystems had been improperly and continuously storing unencrypted cardholder data."
