= AccentHealth =

Healthcare media company

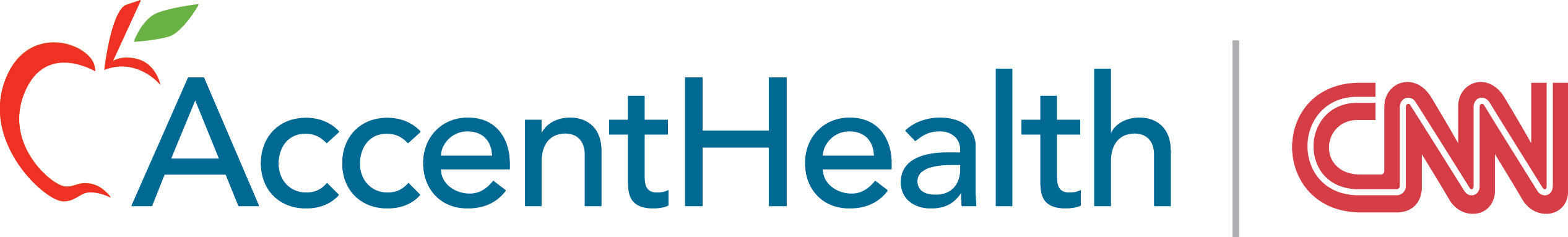
- Country: United States
- Headquarters: 7844 Woodland Center Blvd., Tampa, Florida

Ownership
- Owner: Outcome Health

History
- Launched: 1995
- Former names: Better Health Network, 1998

Links
- Website: http://www.accenthealth.com/

AccentHealth was a healthcare media company founded in 1995.

== History ==
AccentHealth was founded in Tampa, FL in 1995 by Philip M. Cohen and Richard Ruth. It was acquired by two private equity firms, M/C Partners and Ridgemont Equity Partners (formerly Bank of America Capital Investors) in 2008 from John Malone’s Ascent Media Corp.

In November 2012, the company acquired the wallboard division of the Havas Impact Group, and in February 2013 it acquired the in-office television network of Everwell.

In May 2013, AccentHealth was a co-founder of the Point-of-Care Communication Council [PoC3]. On behalf of its healthcare media and information company members, the PoC3 advocates for the effective use of the Point-of-Care channel to advance health and healthcare outcomes.

The company was acquired in November 2016 by ContextMedia, which later changed its name to Outcome Health.
