= Fusepoint Managed Services =

- Type: Private
- Industry: IT Services; Internet hosting service Disaster recovery Firewall Security
- Founded: 1999
- Headquarters: Toronto, Ontario, Canada
- Website: www.fusepoint.com

Fusepoint Managed Services was a provider of managed IT solutions for companies throughout North America. Founded in 1999, Fusepoint (formerly known as RoundHeaven Communications) grew by over 1,400% within five years and, in 2008, was ranked 46th by PROFIT magazine in a list of Canada's 100 fastest-growing companies. Fusepoint was ranked as the 83rd largest technology company according to Globe's Branham Group. Fusepoint was a privately held company with offices and data centres in Vancouver, Toronto, Montreal and Quebec City. Savvis, Inc acquired Fusepoint in 2010.

Fusepoint operates as a managed service provider (MSP), helping to safeguard and guarantee access to a company's data and mission-critical applications through a variety of services including infrastructure hosting, disaster recovery, and firewall security.

Fusepoint has one primary investor. M/C Venture Partners, a Boston, Massachusetts-based venture capital firm, invested US$20 million in Fusepoint in July 2001 and an additional US$10 million in 2004. Savvis, Inc. declared on June 1, 2010, that it had signed a definite agreement to purchase Fusepoint for around $124.5 million in cash, subject to adjustments related to working capital. The transaction was finalized on June 16, 2010.

Fusepoint acquisitions include Toronto-based Worldwide Online, a hosting and professional services firm in March 2005 and Montreal-based outsourcing firm Versus in October 2004. The company regularly conducts polls in Canada on topics on identity theft, business continuity, and disaster recovery.

== Special Certifications ==
Payment Card Industry Data Security Standard (P.C.I. DSS)

On November 28, 2007, Fusepoint announced it had become one of the very few managed hosting providers in Canada to become Payment Card Industry Data Security Standard (PCI DSS) compliant. Fusepoint is recognized by Visa as a Tier 1 Payment Card Industry Certified Service Provider.

VMware Hosting Services

In December 2007, Fusepoint began offering managed hosting solutions on both physical and virtual servers by joining the VMware Service Provider Program (VSPP) and offering VMware to both large enterprises and small to medium-sized businesses.

Microsoft Partnership

Fusepoint is recognized by Microsoft as a Gold Certified Partner, offering Microsoft SharePoint Application Development and Hosting services capabilities.
