= Zayo Group =

American communications company

Zayo Group Holdings, Inc.
- Type: Private
- Traded as: NYSE: ZAYO (2014–2020)
- Industry: Communications infrastructure
- Founded: 2007; 19 years ago
- Founders: Dan Caruso; John Scarano; Matt Erickson
- Headquarters: Denver, Colorado, U.S.
- Area served: Global
- Key people: Sowmyanarayan Sampath Chief Executive Officer, Bill Long Chief Product and Strategy Officer, Brian Daniel’s Chief Revenue Officer, Infrastructure, Chris Ranalli Chief Revenue Officer, Enterprise
- Products: Digital Infrastructure Provider
- Services: Fiber and bandwidth connectivity, colocation and cloud infrastructure
- Owners: EQT AB; Digital Colony
- Number of employees: 3,781 (2019)
- ASN: 6461
- Website: zayo.com

Zayo Group, Inc. is a digital infrastructure company providing fiber-optic networks, high-capacity connectivity, and networking solutions to enterprises, hyperscalers, cloud and content providers, data centers, and telecommunications carriers worldwide.

The company operates an extensive fiber-optic network across North America and provides international connectivity through its global network infrastructure and partnerships. Its portfolio includes dark fiber, wavelength services, dedicated internet access, Ethernet, cloud connectivity, and managed network solutions.

Zayo's infrastructure supports cloud computing, artificial intelligence, data center interconnection, and other data-intensive applications. Founded in 2007, the company has expanded its network footprint and capabilities through infrastructure investment, network construction, and strategic acquisitions.

== Founding and acquisition history ==
Zayo was founded in 2007 by Dan Caruso, John Scarano and Matt Erickson as a Delaware corporation. In 2007, Zayo acquired Memphis Networx, VoicePipe, Onvoy Inc, PPL Telcom and Indiana Fiber Works.

In 2008, Zayo acquired Columbia Fiber Solution, Adesta Communications assets, two sets of fiber assets from Citynet, two sets of fiber assets from Northwest Telephone, and CenturyTel Regional Markets.

In 2009, Zayo acquired FiberNet Telcom Group, Inc.

In 2010, Zayo acquired AGL Networks, American Fiber Systems, and Dolphini's Cummins Station data center and colocation services.

In 2011, Zayo acquired MarquisNet data center business in Las Vegas, and 360networks.

In 2012 Zayo acquired AboveNet, FiberGate, Arialink, US Carrier Telecom, First Telecom Services, and Maryland-based Litecast/Balticore.

In 2013, Zayo acquired Austin-based data center operator Core NAP, Access Communications, Midwest-based dark fiber operator FiberLink, and Corelink Data Centers.

In 2014, Zayo acquired Dallas-based data center operator CoreXchange, French network operator Neo Telecoms SAS and UK-based Geo Networks.

In 2015, the company acquired Latisys, IdeaTek Systems and Viatel. In 2016, Zayo acquired a new Dallas, TX data center from Stream Data Centers, Clearview International and Allstream, Canada's main facilities-based inter-exchange carrier which has its roots in the railway telegraph business CNCP Telecommunications. As of July 2016, Zayo has completed 39 acquisitions.

On November 30, 2016, Zayo Group Holdings Inc said it would buy smaller rival Electric Lightwave for $1.42 billion in cash to expand its fiber network on the U.S. West Coast.

In November 2017, Zayo purchased Spread Networks, a company that operated an 825-mile-long fiber route connecting New York and Chicago.

In January 2018, Zayo announced they would be acquiring Optic Zoo Networks, a Vancouver, BC based fiber operation.

In May 2019, Zayo announced an agreement to be acquired by EQT AB and Digital Colony. The deal to take Zayo private was completed in March 2020.

In January 2022, Zayo announced they would be acquiring QOS Networks from majority owner M/C Partners.

In November 2023, Zayo announced the acquisition of a Stuttgart-based fiber infrastructure and network services company, Globalways GmbH.

In February 2024, Zayo announced the appointment of telecommunications executive Nikos Katinakis as its new Chief Technology Officer.

In March 2024, Zayo announced its partnership with Secure Access Service Edge (SASE) developer Netskope for its Managed Edge services.

On March 13, 2025, Zayo announced the intended acquisition of Crown Castle's fiber solutions business for $4.25 billion.

=== Onvoy spinoff ===
On June 13, 2014, Onvoy spun off from Zayo Group Holdings. On June 16, 2014, Onvoy LLC acquired the assets of Vitelity, a voice over IP provider based in Denver, Colorado. On September 3, 2015, Onvoy LLC acquired Broadvox Communications, a competitive local exchange carrier VoIP service provider for business telecommunications.

== Network and services ==
Zayo owns a fiber network that spans more than 130,000 route miles in North America and Europe. Zayo operates a Tier 1 IP network, with settlement-free peering with all other Tier 1 providers. Zayo's services include dark fiber, wavelengths, SONET, Ethernet, SD-WAN, IP services, colocation, wireless backhaul and small cells.
