= New York State Insurance Fund =

Government insurance carrier

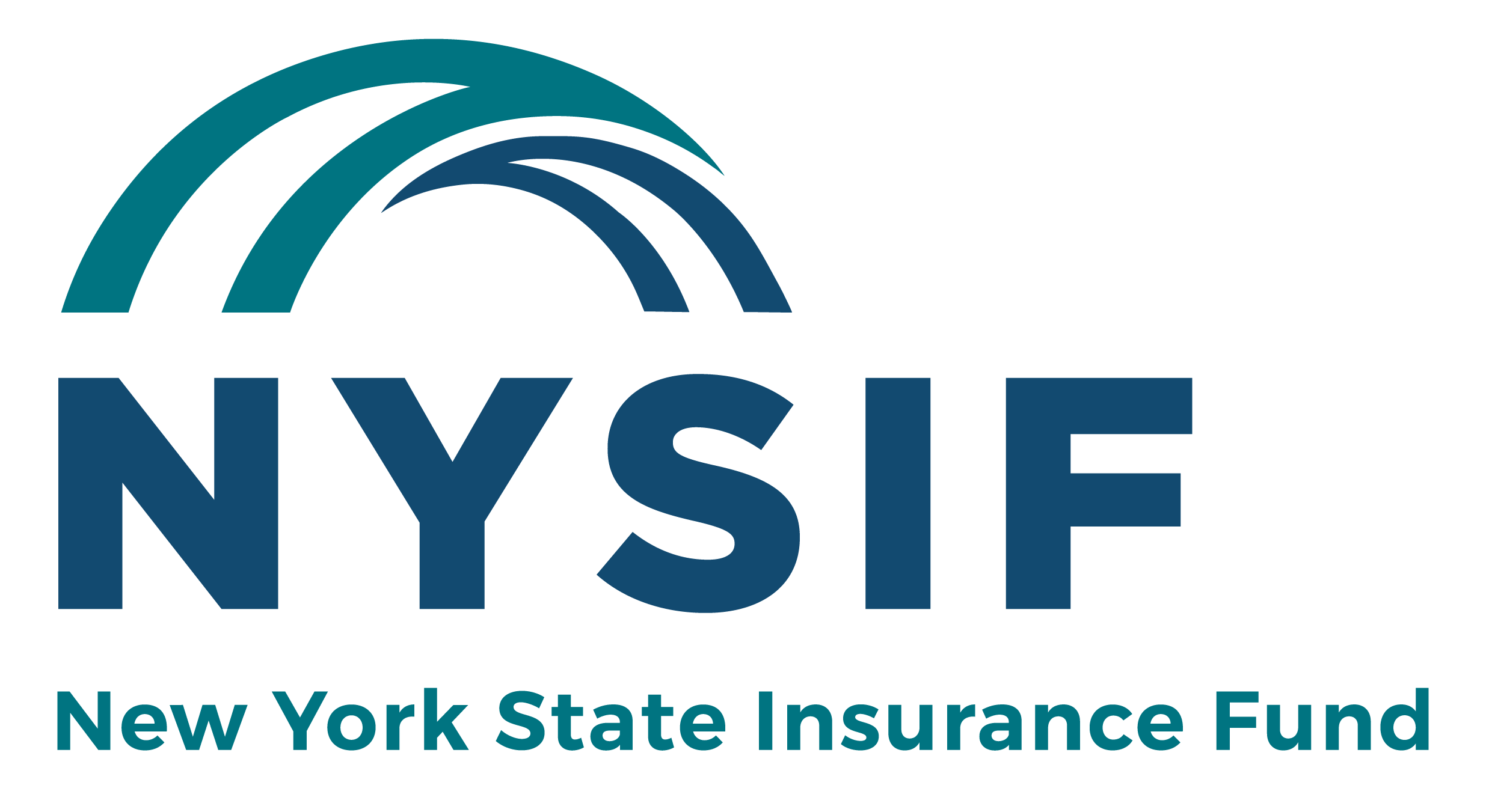
Logo of the New York State Insurance Fund

The New York State Insurance Fund (NYSIF) is a governmental insurance carrier that provides workers' compensation and disability benefits for employers in New York State. NYSIF is financially self-supporting and competes with private insurance carriers. It is required by law to provide the lowest possible premiums to maintain its solvency. As of 2015, NYSIF was the largest workers' compensation insurance carrier in New York, with 46% of the market, and that year it earned $2.48 billion in premiums, placing it in the top ten in the United States. On August 21, 2019, the agency launched a rebranding initiative with a new logo.

== History ==
NYSIF's Workers' Compensation Fund was established by the Workers' Compensation Act of 1914 to insure employers against work-related injuries suffered by their employees. Its creation was spurred by the 1909 Wainwright Commission, which found that then-current employer liability law was inadequate, and the 1911 Triangle Shirtwaist Factory fire.

The Disability Benefits Fund was established in 1949 to insure against off-the-job injury or illness suffered by employees. In 2010, NYSIF began offering enhanced disability benefits in excess of the statutory minimum.

In 2014, a New York grand jury made recommendations on measures to combat clients misreporting the categorization of their workers to illegally lower their premiums. In 2016, part of NYSIF's Manhattan office was displaced by a new New York State Police office.

Changes to workers' compensation premiums have affected sports organizations, horse racing, and puppetmakers. The last of these was a result of them being misclassified under rubber manufacturing rather than theatrical production, putting them in the same risk category as tire manufacturers which work with molten rubber and causing the premium to increase nearly 15 times, before publicity caused the problem to be fixed.

== Issues ==
Private insurance companies have complained that NYSIF has advantages that allow it to outcompete private insurers rather than acting in its intended purpose as a carrier of last resort. These include not making payment to the Aggregate Trust Fund for permanent disability cases, having different reserve requirements, requiring 30-day advance notice for cancellations, and lack of state oversight. In 2008 the Insurance Agents and Brokers of New York trade group supported a bill in the state legislature to remove some of these advantages.

At various times in the past, the New York state government has taken money from NYSIF's reserves to cover other budget shortfalls. Between 1982 and 1990, $1.3 billion was transferred to the state's general fund under Governor Mario Cuomo. In 1996 the practice was banned by state law. In 2013, Governor Andrew Cuomo proposed lowering the reserve requirements for second-injury claims to match those required for private insurers, in order to transfer $1.75 billion out of NYSIF's reserve funds over four years.
