= PlumChoice =

Provider of cloud and technical support services in Lowell, Massachusetts

- Industry: Software Delivery Platform, Technical Support, Help Desk, Customer Service,
- Founded: 2001
- Defunct: 2018
- Fate: Acquired by Allstate
- Headquarters: Lowell, MA, United States
- Key people: Vince Tseng (President and CEO) Chris Phaneuf (Sr. Vice President, Operations); Dave Blahnik (Sr. Vice President, Finance); Rich MacKeen (Vice president, Solutions Engineering) Bing He (Vice president, Engineering Services)
- Number of employees: 650
- Website: www.plumchoice.com

PlumChoice was a privately held corporation with headquarters that was located in Lowell, Massachusetts. PlumChoice was a provider of cloud and technical support services to consumers and small businesses. In 2018, The Allstate Corporation (NYSE: ALL) acquired Plumchoice and merged them into Allstate's SquareTrade division.

== History ==
PlumChoice started in CEO and Founder Ted Werth's basement in 2001.

In January 2006, the company moved to an office location in Bedford, Massachusetts. Shortly after, PlumChoice and Firedog finalized their service contract, and PlumChoice began operating its first call center in April of that year.

In April 2007, PlumChoice moved office locations to Billerica, Massachusetts.

In 2009, Edison Ventures announced it was investing $2.8 million in PlumChoice to help “grow the company's markets, expand sales, and support marketing, business operations, and product development”.

In October 2009, PlumChoice opened its second location in Scarborough, Maine.

In September 2011, PlumChoice announced a partnership with N.E.W. and Asurion that will bring customer help services to NEWAsurion's existing warranty, insurance, and product offerings. PlumChoice's Americas president and COO Fred King believes this new partnership will result in the ability for PlumChoice, Asurion, and N.E.W. to collectively "meet more than 95 percent of consumer and small business technology needs."

In October 2012, PlumChoice moved office locations to CrossPoint Towers in Lowell, Massachusetts.

In 2012, PlumChoice introduced technical support services for Internet of things (ioT), mitigating support costs with installation and configuration assistance for smart solutions.

In 2016, David Shimoni was appointed as the president and CEO of PlumChoice. He led the company through a major business improvement and positioned the company as an attractive acquisition target for Allstate (whose SquareTrade division integrated PlumChoice into its business)

In 2017, PlumChoice signed their 1 millionth subscriber.

In 2018, PlumChoice signed their 700,000 Cloud Services customer.

11/30/2018: Allstate Corp has acquired PlumChoice.
"NORTHBROOK, Ill., Nov. 8, 2018 – The Allstate Corporation has agreed to acquire PlumChoice, in a $30 million deal. The privately held company, headquartered in Lowell, Massachusetts, will become part of SquareTrade, Allstate's provider of protection plans for mobile phones, consumer electronics and appliances."

== Office locations ==
PlumChoice corporate headquarters were located in Lowell, Massachusetts.
