= Indefeasible rights of use =

Telecommunications lease agreement

Indefeasible right of use (IRU) is a type of telecommunications lease permanent contractual agreement that cannot be undone, established between the owners of a communications system and a customer of that system. The word "indefeasible" means "not capable of being annulled, or voided, or undone". The customer purchases the right to use a certain amount of the capacity of the system, for a specified number of years. IRU contracts are almost always long-term, commonly lasting 20 to 30 years. The communication system can be a hard connection (wire or fiber-optic cable) or wireless (such as a satellite link). An IRU owner can unconditionally and exclusively use the relevant capacity of the IRU grantor’s network for the specified time period. These agreements are common for submarine communications cables.

These contracts obligate the purchaser to pay a portion of the operating costs, and the costs of maintaining the cable, including any costs incurred repairing the cable after mishaps. The right of use is indefeasible, so the capacity purchased is also nonreturnable, and maintenance costs incurred become payable and irrefusable.

== Definition ==
The IRU "shall mean the exclusive, unrestricted, and indefeasible right to use the relevant capacity (including equipment, fibers or capacity) for any legal purpose". It refers to the bandwidth purchased after, for example, a submarine cable system has been sealed at the end of construction, and to the maintenance agreement (C&MA) among the owners. It is a way for the owners to capitalize the unused capacity or any unowned capacity, after the system comes into service.

In short, buying an IRU gives the purchaser the right to use some capacity on a telecommunications cable system, including the right to lease that capacity to someone else. Smaller companies that need a leased line between two do not buy an IRU; instead, they lease capacity from a telecommunications company that themselves may lease a larger amount of capacity from another company (and so on), until at the end of the chain of contracts there is a company that has an IRU, or wholly owns a cable system.

Today, so-called IRUs allow a telecom carrier to buy all types of telecom capacity and gear at low rates, typically for periods of 20 to 25 years. Since IRUs are technically rights to a physical part of an underground cable, they can be considered an asset. That means their cost is not part of a company's operating results, but instead is included in the tangible assets on a firm's balance sheet.

According to The Wall Street Journal, dark fiber was pioneered decades ago by AT&T, when it still enjoyed monopoly power. IRUs allowed AT&T's competitors to gain access to the expensive undersea cables that only AT&T could afford to build. There remains some controversy over booking IRUs as assets in an asset-swap transaction between companies. The IRU is counted as though it is a part of the physical plant of the business buying it.

== Dark fiber IRU ==
The Dark fiber (DF) IRU "shall mean the exclusive, unrestricted, and indefeasible right to use one, a pair, or more strands of fiber of a fiber cable for any legal purpose". With an IRU contractual arrangement, the buyer of the IRU can unconditionally, and exclusively, use the fibers of the IRU for a long time period, around 25–30 years.

In this case dark fiber is called "dark" since it has to be lit by the IRU owner, not the cable's owner. The wholesale purchase of dark fiber has normally been accomplished by means of IRUs. Fiber cable owners do not normally sell their fiber but offer IRUs for up to 20 years for unrestricted use. 10 to 25 years corresponds to a typical lifetime of the Optical fiber cable systems. The upfront cost for the purchase of a 20-year IRU can be a one-time investment. It will normally be associated with ongoing obligations for shared maintenance. Usually, the IRU can be considered to be a physical asset, which can be resold, traded or used as collateral.

For regulatory reasons, generally only licensed carriers are allowed access to support structures, and to municipal rights of way.

The IRU contract defines detailed technical and performance specifications for the IRU fibers. More specifically, it includes dark fiber acceptance and testing procedures, the description of the dark fiber physical route, operating specifications for the dark fiber infrastructure, performance specifications (attenuation, Chromatic Dispersion, Polarization Mode Dispersion, Optical Return Loss), maintenance and restoration terms. These terms must be valid for the full duration of the IRU contract. Moreover, it includes specific actions and procedures in cases of changes on the IRU grantor’s fiber network, degradation of fiber performance etc.

== Payment ==
- A lump-sum payment corresponding to the dark-fiber construction cost and the use of the dark-fiber infrastructure for the IRU duration. This payment usually accounts for the greatest part of the IRU budget.
- A periodic fee corresponding to the maintenance services provided to IRU user by the IRU grantor. This is usually fixed or slightly increasing, taking into account inflation.
