= M/C Partners =

American private equity firm

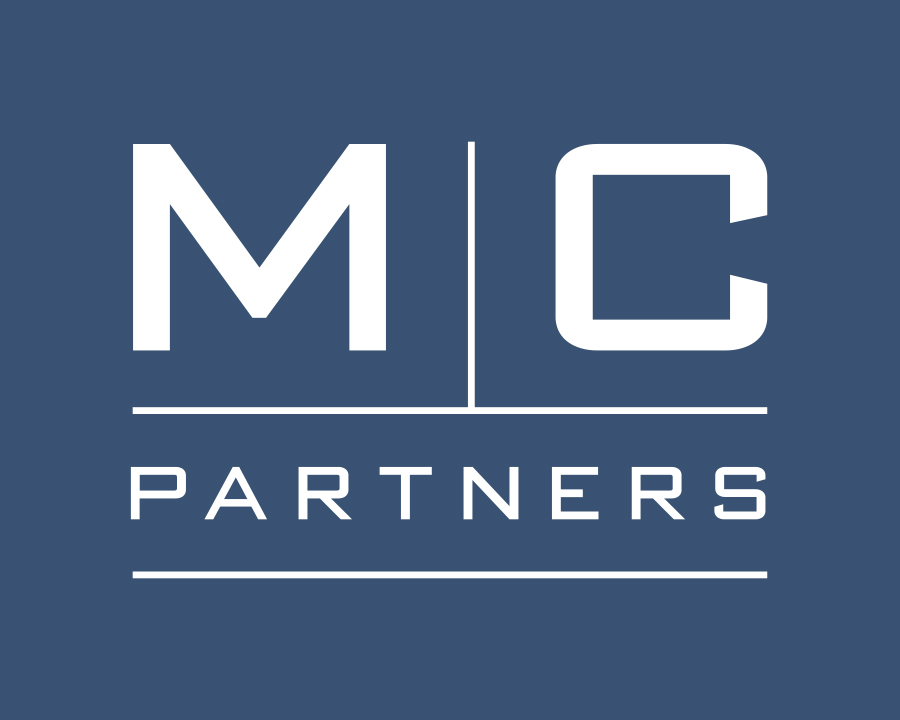
- Type: Private
- Industry: Private equity
- Predecessor: TA Associates Media / Communications Group
- Founded: 1986; 40 years ago
- Founders: David Croll; Jim Wade
- Headquarters: Boston, Massachusetts, United States
- Products: Venture capital, private equity
- Total assets: $2.4 billion
- Number of employees: 20+
- Website: mcpartners.com

M/C Partners, formerly known as Media Communications Partners, is a private equity firm focused on growth equity investments in emerging companies in the media and communications industries. M/C invests in early, mid, and late stage companies as well as turnarounds and buyouts in its sectors of focus.

The firm, which is based in Boston, Massachusetts, was founded in 1986 as a spinout from venture capital firm, TA Associates. M/C has offices in San Francisco and London.

The firm has raised approximately $3.0 billion since inception across nine funds.

== History ==
M/C Partners, formerly known as Media Communications Partners, was founded in 1986. The company's co-founder, Dave Croll, was previously a managing partner at venture capital firm TA Associates. Co-founder Jim Wade also previously worked in the Media/Communications Group at TA.

In 1986, the Media/Communications group and the funds it managed completed a spinout from TA to form an independent firm. The firm raised its first fund Media/Communications Partners in 1987 with $283 million of investor commitments. In 1992, the firm's second fund was raised with $167 million of capital and then four years later Media / Communications Partners III was raised with $265 million of capital. M/C raised its fourth fund with $230 million in 1999 and a year later the firm raised M/C Venture Partners V with $550 million.

In 2006, the firm completed fundraising for M/C Venture Partners VI with $550 million of investor commitments to focus on later stage growth capital investments.

== Investments ==
The firm invests in emerging communications related information technology companies in the US and internationally. M/C is currently investing out of its ninth fund, M/C Partners IX, a $350 million growth equity fund raised in 2023.

Among the firm's most notable investments are such notable companies as: AccentHealth, Airband, Cellular One, Fusepoint Managed Services, HyPerformix, ICG Communications, Legendary Pictures, MetroPCS, Mobi, Nuvox, PlumChoice, Inc., Revol Wireless, Triton PCS, Western Wireless Corporation, and Zayo Bandwidth.
