= Reference customer =

Customer who publicly endorses a product

In B2B sales and marketing, a reference customer is a customer (especially, but not always, a high profile one) who agrees to publicly endorse a vendor's product, receiving in exchange various benefits such as improved support, influence over the product's future direction, access to the vendor's senior leadership team, or discounts. A reference customer program (or customer reference program) represents a formalised business process involving the identification of potential reference accounts, internal processes of validating their appropriateness as reference customers, approaching the customer with the offer to join the program and selling them on its benefits, seeking the customer's consent to join and obtaining legal permissions to use their name and logo in marketing collateral, organising opportunities to leverage the reference customer base throughout the sales process (such as by having them join sales calls), and ensuring the reference customers are continuing to experience the arrangement as mutually beneficial. Commonly, the ownership and overall management of a reference customer program belongs to product management.
