= Dark fibre =

Unused optical fibre

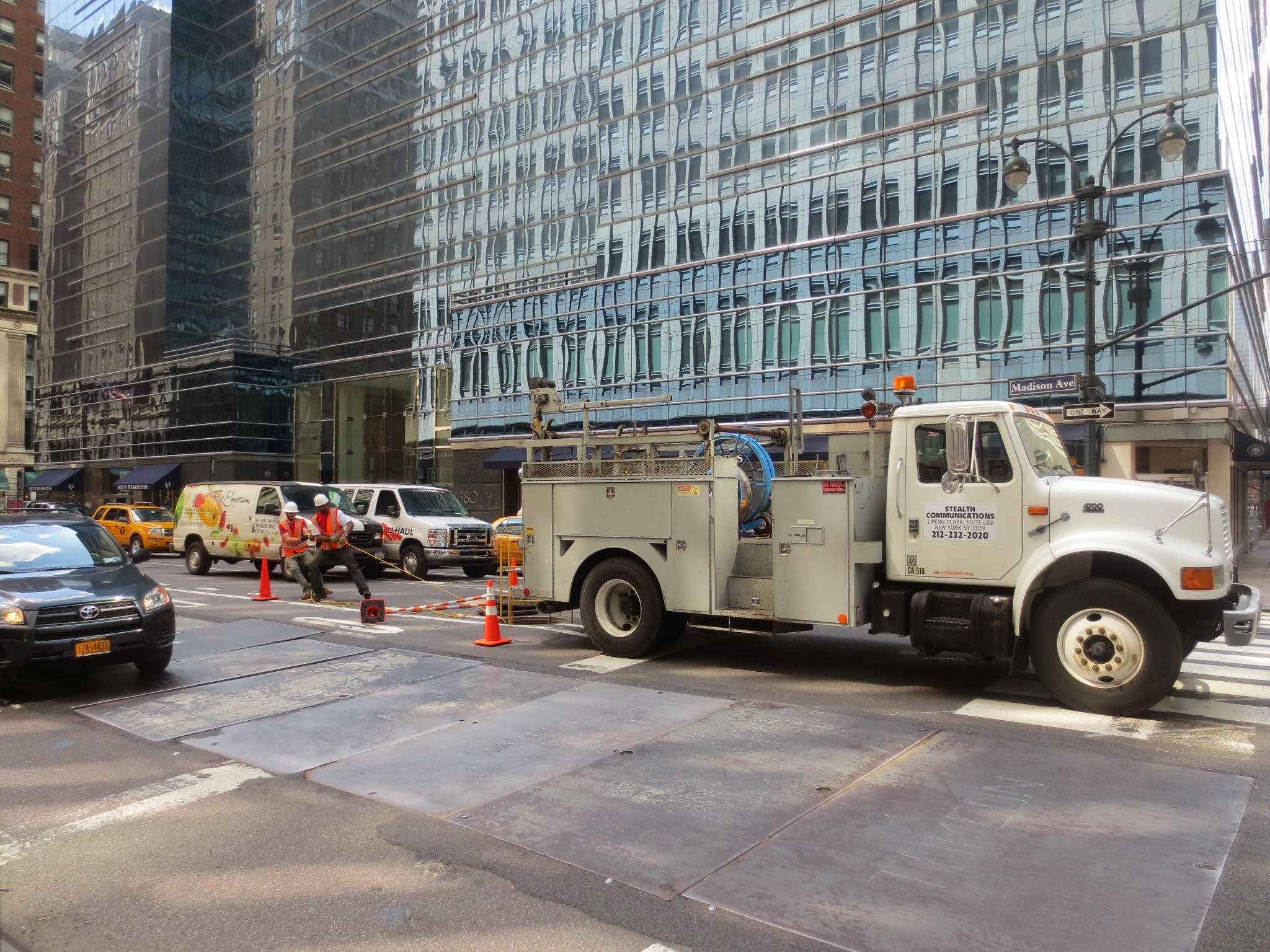
Fibre crew installing a 432-count dark fibre cable underneath the streets of Midtown Manhattan, New York City

A dark fibre or unlit fibre is an unused optical fibre, available for use in fibre-optic communication. Dark fibre may be leased from a network service provider.

Dark fibre originally referred to the potential network capacity of telecommunication infrastructure. Because the marginal cost of installing additional fibre optic cables is very low once a trench has been dug or conduit laid, a great excess of fibre was installed in the US during the telecom boom of the late 1990s and early 2000s. This excess capacity was later referred to as dark fibre following the dot-com crash of the early 2000s that briefly reduced demand for high-speed data transmission.

These unused fibre optic cables later created a new market for unique private services that could not be accommodated on lit fibre cables (i.e., cables used in traditional long-distance communication).

== Motivations ==
Much of the cost of installing cables is in the civil engineering work required. This includes planning and routing, obtaining permissions, creating ducts and channels for the cables, and finally installation and connection. This work usually accounts for most of the cost of developing fibre networks. For example, in Amsterdam's citywide installation of a fibre network, roughly 80% of the costs involved were labour, with only 10% being fibre. It, therefore, makes sense to plan for, and install, significantly more fibre than is needed for current demand, to provide for future expansion and provide for network redundancy in case any of the cables fail. Many fibre-optic cable owners such as railroads and power utilities have always included additional fibres with the intention to lease these to other carriers.

During the dot-com bubble, a large number of telephone companies in the United States built optical-fibre networks, each with the business plan of cornering the market in telecommunications by providing a network with sufficient capacity to take all existing and forecast traffic for the entire region served. This was based on the assumption that telecoms traffic, particularly data traffic, would continue to grow exponentially for the foreseeable future. The advent of wavelength-division multiplexing reduced the demand for fibre by increasing the capacity of a single fibre by a factor of as much as 100.

According to Gerry Butters, the former head of Lucent Technologies's Optical Networking Group at Bell Labs, the amount of data that could be carried by an optical fibre was doubling every nine months at the time. This progress in the ability to carry data over fibre reduced the need for more fibres. As a result, the wholesale price for data communications collapsed and a number of these companies filed for bankruptcy protection. Global Crossing and Worldcom are two high-profile examples in the United States.

Similar to the Railway Mania, the misfortune of one market sector became the good fortune of another, and this overcapacity created a new telecommunications sector.

== Market ==
For many years incumbent local exchange carriers would not sell dark fibre to end users, because they believed selling access to this core asset would cannibalize their other, more lucrative services. Incumbent carriers in the United States were required to sell dark fibre to competitive local exchange carriers as unbundled network elements (UNE), but they have successfully lobbied to reduce these provisions for existing fibre, and eliminated it completely for new fibre placed for fibre to the premises (FTTP) deployments.

Fibre swaps between competitive carriers are quite common. This increases the reach of their networks in places where their competitor has a presence, in exchange for the provision of fibre capacity in places where that competitor has no presence. This is a practice known in the industry as "coopetition".

Meanwhile, other companies arose specializing as dark fibre providers. Dark fibre became more available when there was enormous overcapacity after the telecoms boom years of the late 1990s through 2001. The market for dark fibre tightened up with the return of capital investment to light up existing fibre and with mergers and acquisitions resulting in a consolidation of dark fibre providers.

== Networks ==
Dark fibre can be used to create a privately operated optical fibre network that is run directly by its operator over dark fibre leased or purchased from another supplier. This is opposed to purchasing bandwidth or leased line capacity on an existing network. Dark fibre networks may be used for private networking, or as Internet access or Internet infrastructure networking.

Dark fibre networks may be point-to-point, or use star, self-healing ring, or mesh topologies.

Because both ends of the link are controlled by the same organization, dark fibre networks can operate using the latest optical protocols using wavelength division multiplexing to add capacity where needed, and to provide an upgrade path between technologies. Many dark fibre metropolitan area networks use cheap Gigabit Ethernet equipment over CWDM, rather than expensive SONET ring systems.

They offer very high price-performance for network users who require high performance, such as Google, which has dark network capacities for video and search data, or wish to operate their own network for security or other commercial reasons.

However, dark fibre networks are generally only available in high-population-density areas where fibre has already been laid, as the civil engineering costs of installing fibre to new locations is often prohibitive. For these reasons, dark fibre networks are typically run between data centres and other places with existing fibre infrastructure.

== Variations ==
Managed dark fibre is a form of wavelength-division multiplexed access to otherwise dark fibre where a pilot signal is beamed into the fibre by the fibre provider for management purposes using a transponder tuned to an assigned wavelength.

Virtual dark fibre using wavelength multiplexing allows a service provider to offer individual wavelengths. Other wavelengths on the same fibre are leased to other customers or used for other purposes. This is typically done using coarse wavelength division multiplexing CWDM because the wider 20 nm spacing of the wavebands makes these systems much less susceptible to interference.

== See also ==
- Fiber-optic communication
- Indefeasible rights of use
- Submarine communications cable
