= List of University of Chicago Booth School of Business alumni =

This list of University of Chicago Booth School of Business alumni consists of notable people who graduated or attended the University of Chicago Booth School of Business (Chicago Booth), formerly known as the University of Chicago Graduate School of Business. The business school was renamed in 2008 in honor of the $300 million gift made by David G. Booth. Chicago Booth has over 49,000 alumni.

== Academics/journalists/writers ==
- Megan McArdle, economics journalist and blogger, formerly at Atlantic Monthly, now with Bloomberg
- Philip Kotler, author of textbook Marketing Management: Analysis, Planning, Implementation and Control, received his master's degree in economics and did post-doctoral work in behavioral science at the University of Chicago
- Sara Paretsky, novelist and creator of the V.I. Warshawski mystery series
- G. William Schwert, finance academic, professor emeritus at University of Rochester, editor of Journal of Financial Economics
- Juliana Schroeder, behavioral scientist, professor at Haas School of Business
- Julian Simon, economist and professor at the University of Illinois and University of Maryland, known for the Simon-Ehrlich wager
- Stan Smith, economist credited with coining the hedonic damages theory
- Dick Stoken, investment author and businessman
- Hans Stoll, professor at Vanderbilt University, president of the American Finance Association
- Ursula Batchelder Stone, business researcher and college professor at George Williams College, president of Hyde Park League of Women Voters, first woman to earn a PhD in business at a US university
- Maya Stovall, anthropologist and conceptual artist, professor at California State Polytechnic University
- Shawn Tully, reporter for CNBC, business journalist and senior editor at Fortune Magazine
- Marion A. Trozzolo, developer, inventor and business professor at Rockhurst University
- William J. Vatter, accounting scholar and professor, 2004 member of Accounting Hall of Fame
- Tad Waddington, author and businessperson previously with Accenture
- Robert I. Webb, author and finance professor at University of Virginia
- Ivo Welch, economist and professor, two-time recipient of Michael Brennan Award
- Bernard Yeung, economist and academic, former dean of the NUS Business School
- Gerald Zaltman, author and professor emeritus at Harvard Business School

== Government / public service / non-profit ==
- Andrew Alper, former president of the New York City Economic Development Corporation
- Roger C. Altman, former deputy United States secretary of the treasury under the Clinton administration; former assistant United States secretary of the treasury under the Carter administration; chairman, co-CEO and co-founder of Evercore Partners; former vice chairman of The Blackstone Group
- Elizabeth H. Bradley, eleventh president of Vassar College
- Jon Corzine '73, governor of New Jersey, and former CEO of Goldman Sachs
- Erroll Davis, 1967, superintendent of Atlanta Public Schools
- Dirk J. Debbink, United States Navy vice admiral and head of the United States Navy Reserve
- Arnold Donald, president and CEO of the Juvenile Diabetes Research Foundation
- Zhou Fengsuo, human rights activist, former elected leader of the Beijing Students' Autonomous Federation
- Don Harmon, president of the Illinois Senate
- Ron Huberman, CEO of Chicago Public Schools, previously president of the Chicago Transit Authority
- Jörg Kukies, German Minister of Finance (2024-)
- Christina Liu (MBA, PhD), former finance minister of Taiwan (2012)
- Jack Markell, 1985, governor of Delaware
- Peter G. Peterson (1972–1973), U.S. secretary of commerce; chairman of The Blackstone Group
- Charles Plosser, president and CEO of the Federal Reserve Bank of Philadelphia
- Steven Preston, U.S. secretary of Housing and Urban Development, U.S. administrator of the Small Business Administration
- Pete Ricketts, former governor of Nebraska
- Janet Yang Rohr, politician, member of the Illinois House of Representatives
- Neal Simon, author, former chair of the Greater Washington Community Foundation, former CEO of Bronfman Rothschild
- Ken Simpler, former Delaware State Treasurer
- Nick Sinai, venture capitalist and former Deputy Chief Technology Officer of the United States
- Emil Skodon, US ambassador to Brunei Darussalam
- Beryl Wayne Sprinkel, chairman of the Council of Economic Advisors, 1985–1989
- Maurice B. Stein, former president of the American Camping Association
- Robert K. Steel, former under secretary for Domestic Finance within the United States Department of the Treasury; former CEO of Wachovia Bank (2008–2010); former vice-chairman of Goldman Sachs
- Chris Stout, psychologist and founder of Center for Global Initiatives nonprofit
- Krishnamurthy Subramanian, 17th chief economic adviser to the Government of India
- Mark Villar, senator of the Philippines (2022–present), secretary of Public Works and Highways (2016–2021), member of the House of Representatives from Las Pinas (2010–2016)
- John C. Yoder, judge and member of the West Virginia Senate
- Todd Young, 2000, U.S. senator from Indiana
- Kateryna Yushchenko, first lady of Ukraine

== Business ==
=== Banking and financial services ===
- Andrew Alper, president of the New York City Economic Development Corporation, youngest Goldman Sachs partner in company history, university trustee
- Roger Altman, senior chairman and co-founder of Evercore Partners; former vice chairman of The Blackstone Group; former deputy U.S. Treasury secretary under the Clinton administration; former assistant U.S. Treasury secretary under the Carter administration
- Martin Blessing, former CEO of Commerzbank and board member of UBS
- Archie R. Boe, former chairman and CEO of the Allstate Corporation
- Dennis Chookaszian, businessman and former chairman and CEO of CNA Insurance
- Jon Corzine, former CEO of Goldman Sachs, former governor of New Jersey
- Brady Dougan, former CEO of Credit Suisse Group
- Eric Gleacher, founder chairman of Gleacher & Co.
- Joe Mansueto, chairman of Morningstar, Inc.
- Philip J. Purcell, former chairman and CEO of Morgan Stanley, and current president of Continental Investors
- Jerry Rao, founder and former CEO of the software company MphasiS
- Pete Ricketts, former vice-chairman of TD Ameritrade and candidate for the U.S. Senate in Nebraska
- Thomas S. Ricketts, CEO of Incapital LLC; family trust was selected as winning bidder for the Chicago Cubs
- Robert Steel, CEO of Wachovia; former under secretary of the U.S. Treasury for domestic finance; former vice chairman of Goldman Sachs
- Joel Stern, CEO of Stern Stewart & Co and developer of Economic value added concept
- Barry F. Sullivan, former chairman and CEO of First Chicago Corporation, deputy mayor of New York City under David Dinkins, chairman of the university board of trustees
- Susan Wagner, co-founder and former COO of Blackrock, board member of Apple Inc.
- Bassam Yammine, economist, former CEO of Credit Suisse Saudi Arabia

=== Private equity ===
- William E. Conway, Jr., founding partner and managing director of The Carlyle Group
- Marcel Erni, billionaire co-founder of Partners Group
- James M. Kilts, founding partner of Centerview Partners; former chairman, president, and CEO of Gillette Company
- Eric Kriss, co-founder of Bain Capital
- Martin Nesbitt, co-founder of the Vistria Group, former national treasurer for the Barack Obama campaign, chairman of the Barack Obama Foundation
- Peter G. Peterson, founder and chairman of The Blackstone Group, one of the world's largest buyout firms; U.S. Secretary of Commerce (1972–1973); former CEO of Lehman Brothers; co-founder of the Concord Coalition
- Byron D. Trott, managing partner and chief investment officer of BDT Capital Partners, former vice chairman of investment banking for Goldman Sachs and head of their Chicago Office and Mid-West region
- Jon Winkelried, CEO of TPG Capital and former COO of Goldman Sachs

=== Investment management ===
- Clifford S. Asness, founder of AQR Capital, firm with $170+ billion under management; previously with Goldman Sachs as director of Quantitative Research
- David G. Booth, co-founder and chairman of Dimensional Fund Advisors
- Mark Carhart, portfolio manager of Goldman Sachs $8 billion hedge fund called Global Alpha
- Amy Cooper, former insurance portfolio manager at Franklin Templeton
- Dylan Taylor, United States CEO of Colliers International
- Eugene Fama, "father of the efficient-market hypothesis", Nobel laureate in Economics, professor at the Booth School of Business, co-founder of Dimensional Fund Advisors and co-developer of the Fama–French three-factor model; the Research Papers in Economics project ranked him as the seventh-most influential economist of all-time based on his academic contributions
- Diane Garnick, chief income strategist of TIAA
- Roger G. Ibbotson, founder of Ibbotson Associates
- Daniel Ivascyn, CIO of PIMCO
- Michael Larson, investment manager of Bill Gates
- Howard Marks, co-founder and chairman of Oaktree Capital Management, investment firm with $77 billion under management
- John Meriwether, founder and CEO of JWM Partners; founder of Long-Term Capital Management
- Victor Niederhoffer, former hedge fund manager for George Soros and on his own, U.S. Squash Champion and Paddleball Champion, bestselling author, and statistician.
- Emmanuel Roman, CEO of PIMCO and former CEO of Man Group
- Myron Scholes, co-founder of Long-Term Capital Management, co-developer of the Black–Scholes model, co-recipient of the 1997 Nobel Memorial Prize in Economic Sciences
- Rex Sinquefield, co-founder along with David G. Booth and Eugene Fama of Dimensional Fund Advisors
- John Studzinski, vice chairman of PIMCO, former vice chairman of The Blackstone Group, former head of the European investment banking division and deputy chairman of Morgan Stanley
- Barry Zubrow, American investment banker who held roles at Goldman Sachs and JPMorgan Chase

=== Retail/transportation/industry ===
- Bart Becht, former CEO of Reckitt Benckiser
- Debra Crew, president and COO of R. J. Reynolds Tobacco Company
- Melvin Goodes, retired chairman and CEO of Warner-Lambert
- Scott Griffith, former chairman and CEO of Zipcar
- Timothy E. Hoeksema, chairman, president and CEO of Midwest Airlines
- Mark Hoplamazian (MBA 1989), president and CEO of Hyatt Hotels Corporation
- Porter Jarvis (MBA), president, then chairman of Swift & Co., 1955–1967; trustee of the University of Chicago
- James M. Kilts, vice chairman of Procter & Gamble and former chairman, CEO, and president of the Gillette Company
- Robert W. Lane, former chairman and CEO of John Deere
- Dave MacLennan, president and CEO of Cargill
- Joseph Neubauer (MBA 1965), chairman and CEO of ARAMARK Corporation
- Daniel Ninivaggi, CEO of Lordstown Motors, chairman of Garrett Motion, former CEO of Icahn Enterprises and Federal-Mogul
- Thomas Pritzker, executive chairman of Hyatt Hotels Corporation and member of the Pritzker family
- Peer M. Schatz, CEO of Qiagen
- Dean A. Scarborough, former CEO of Avery Dennison Corporation
- Robert Schriesheim, business executive, former CFO of Sears Holdings Corporation and Hewitt Associates, professor at Booth School of Business
- Todd Simmons, former president of Cub Crafters and current president at Cirrus Aircraft
- Frederick D. Sulcer, vice chairman DDB Worldwide, wrote Put a Tiger in Your Tank for ExxonMobil
- Dennis Toeppen, founder and owner of Suburban Express bus service
- Masaaki Tsuya, former chairman and CEO of Bridgestone
- Tim Vieira, businessperson and Shark Tank investor
- John S. Watson, chairman and CEO of Chevron Corporation
- Ray G. Young, CFO and EVP GMC

=== Foods ===
- J. Patrick Doyle, former CEO of Domino's Pizza
- Charles M. Harper, former chairman and CEO of ConAgra Foods, Inc.
- David Johnson, former president and CEO of Campbell's
- Brian Niccol, chairman and CEO of Starbucks
- Charles Shoemate, former chair and CEO of Best Foods
- Dumarsais Simeus, former CEO of TLC Beatrice International Foods
- Robert Whittington, former chief information officer at Wendy's

=== Technology ===
- Dan Caruso, founder of Zayo Group Holdings
- George Conrades, former chairman and CEO of Akamai Technologies
- Bryan Johnson, founder of Braintree, OS Fund and Kernel
- David Lawee, head of corporate development at Google
- Kevan Parekh, CFO of Apple
- Mark Loughridge, CFO of IBM
- Matt Maloney, co-founder and CEO of GrubHub
- Satya Nadella, chairman and CEO of Microsoft
- John R. Opel, former chairman and CEO of IBM
- Dhiraj Rajaram, founder and CEO of Mu-Sigma
- Karen Sheriff, president and CEO of Q9 Networks Inc.
- T. Russell Shields, former leader of Navteq

=== Venture capital ===
- Richard H. Kimball, co-founder and general managing partner of Technology Crossover Ventures
- Robert McCormack, co-founder and advisory director, Trident Capital
- Mark Suster, investment partner at Upfront Ventures (formerly GRP Partners); prominent blogger

=== Entertainment ===
- Jay Rasulo, former CFO of The Walt Disney Company

=== Consulting ===
- James O. McKinsey, founder of McKinsey & Company
- Horacio D. Rozanski, CEO of Booz Allen Hamilton
- Harold L. Sirkin, senior partner of the Boston Consulting Group (BCG) and adviser to President Barack Obama

=== Sports ===
- Mike Girsch, former general manager of the St. Louis Cardinals
- Craig Robinson '92, head basketball coach at Oregon State University, brother-in-law of former president Barack Obama
- Jason Wright, president of the Washington Football Team and former NFL running back
