= Stan Smith (economist) =

American economist

Stan V. Smith is an American economist credited with coining the term and creating the arguments behind the hedonic damages theory, which entered mainstream legal economics in the 1985 court case Sherrod v. Berry. He often presents, publishes, and speaks on economics. He is now president of a national litigation support firm, Smith Economics Group, Ltd., and acts as an expert witness in court cases involving economic damages, from commercial to personal injury damages, including cases where it can be argued the quality of someone's life has been diminished or lost. His economic theories on victim restitution in child pornography in one of his cases that reached the Supreme Court resulted in the Amy Vicky Andy Act signed by President Trump in 2018.

== Life and career ==
Smith was born in 1946 in Rhinelander, Wisconsin. He received his master's degree in economics in 1972 from the University of Chicago's Graduate School of Business, was honorably discharged from the military in 1975, and subsequently received his Ph.D. in economics from the University of Chicago in 1997. He worked as a Staff Economist at the Federal Reserve Board of Governors until 1974, after which he worked for private companies. In 1979 he and Burt Webber and Warren Stearns located and subsequently salvaged the most famous sunken Spanish Treasure galleon of all time, La Concepción, which sank in 1641 In the Atlantic Ocean 100 miles north of the Dominican Republic. At Ibbotson Associates in 1983, Smith originated and created the Stock Bonds Bills and Inflation Series now published by Morningstar, Inc. Later, with Michael Brookshire in 1990, Smith co-authored the first textbook in the field of Forensic Economics, Economic/Hedonic Damages, and created and taught the first course in the nation in Forensic Economics at DePaul University while teaching as an adjunct professor there from 1990 to 1994. He was a member of the Board of Editors of the Journal of Forensic Economics for over a decade and served a term as a vice-president and Member of the board of the National Association of Forensic Economics. Smith lives in Chicago and is married with 6 children. One of whom lives in the UK.

== Hedonic damages ==
In 1985, a case came before the 7th circuit court of appeals in which a police officer shot and killed an unarmed man he believed to be armed. The case, Sherrod v. Berry, made popular the use of hedonic damages to determine the intangible economic value of life lost. In short, hedonic damages attempt to determine how highly a person valued their own life, and receive proportionate compensation. Smith brought the first use of the hedonic damages concept into the limelight with his economic model and testimony in this case, with both positive and negative opinions of the concept over the next few years. Testimony on hedonic damages has been admitted infrequently under the Daubert standard and at least one court has challenged Smith's claim that his testimony has been accepted "in approximately two thirds the states and two-thirds the federal jurisdictions."

In 1990, Smith published an article in the Journal of Forensic Economics titled 'Hedonic Damages and Personal Injury: A Conceptual Approach' along with co-authors Edward P. Berla and Michael L. Brookshire. This article introduced and developed a case for the Lost Pleasure of Life scale, an idea which would later be put to many uses. According to the book 'Assessment of Rehabilitative and Quality of Life Issues in Litigation', this approach provided a theoretical model to quantify the loss of pleasure of life, something which hadn't existed previously.

== See also ==
- Hedonology
