= Yang Xian =

Yang Xian may refer to:

- Yang County or Yang Xian, in Shaanxi, China
- Yang Xian (Ming dynasty), Ming dynasty official
- Bernard Yeung or Yang Xian, Singaporean economist
- Yang Xian (singer), Taiwanese folk singer

== See also ==
- Yixing, formerly Yangxian
