= Hans W. Becherer =

American business executive

- Born: April 19, 1935; Detroit, Michigan
- Died: October 6, 2016 (aged 81); Denver, Colorado
- Occupation: Business executive
- Known for: President of John Deere

Hans Walter Becherer (April 19, 1935 – October 6, 2016) was an American business executive.

== Biography ==
Becherer was born in Detroit, Michigan, he received his undergraduate education at Trinity College (Connecticut), where he was a member of St. Anthony Hall, and his MBA from Harvard. He became president of John Deere in 1987 and led the Company as CEO from 1989 to 2000 following the financial farm crisis of the 1980s. In 1990, Becherer also became chairman of John Deere's board when Robert Hanson retired. Under Becherer's tenure the company became a diversified, global competitor. By 1998 around 25% of Deere & Company sales revenues came from outside the United States and almost 50% of its product mix was non-agricultural. Robert W. Lane was elected to replace Becherer as CEO upon his retirement in 2000.

Becherer was inducted into the Junior Achievement U.S. Business Hall of Fame in 2004. He died in Colorado on October 6, 2016, at the age of 81. At the time of his death, he lived in Denver, Colorado.
