= Opinion polling on the António José Seguro presidency =

Opinion polling on the presidency of António José Seguro has been regularly conducted by Portuguese pollsters since he assumed office in March 2026.

Poll results are listed in the table below in reverse chronological order, showing the most recent first. The highest percentage figure in each polling survey is displayed in bold, and the background shaded in the leading opinion colour. In the instance that there is a tie, then no figure is shaded but both are displayed in bold. The lead column on the right shows the percentage-point difference between the two options, approval and disapproval. Poll results use the date the survey's fieldwork was done, as opposed to the date of publication.

== Polling ==
The table below lists the evolution of public opinion on the President's performance in office, starting on 9 March 2026, following his election victory on the 2026 presidential election.

Polling firm	Fieldwork date	Sample size	António José Seguro			
Polling firm	Fieldwork date	Sample size	Approve	Disapprove	No opinion	Lead
Pitagórica (Note: Weekly tracking poll.)	19 Oct–13 Nov 2026	804	61	30	9	31
Pitagórica	12 Oct–6 Nov 2026	804	62	28	10	34
Pitagórica	5–30 Oct 2026	804	66	24	10	42
ICS/ISCTE	16–25 Oct 2026	808	54.9	20.9	24.2	34.0
Pitagórica	28 Sep–19 Oct 2026	804	70	20	11	50
Pitagórica	21 Sep–16 Oct 2026	804	69	20	11	49
Intercampus	6–12 Oct 2026	615	39.4	22.8	37.8	16.6
Aximage	6–7 Oct 2026	501	60	27	14	33
Pitagórica	14 Sep–10 Oct 2026	804	69	20	11	49
Pitagórica	7 Sep–3 Oct 2026	804	68	22	11	46
Pitagórica	31 Aug–26 Sep 2026	804	68	23	10	45
Aximage	14–15 Sep 2026	500	57	28	15	29
Intercampus	7–14 Sep 2026	609	37.6	25.8	36.6	11.8
Pitagórica	24 Aug–18 Sep 2026	804	69	22	9	47
Pitagórica	18 Aug–12 Sep 2026	804	69	21	10	48
Pitagórica	10 Aug–4 Sep 2026	804	69	20	11	49
Aximage	20–21 Jul 2026	501	63	24	14	39
Intercampus	9–14 Jul 2026	604	45.5	20.0	34.5	25.5
CESOP–UCP	6–10 Jul 2026	996	81	19	—N/a	62
Aximage	24–25 Jun 2026	500	69	18	14	51
Intercampus	10–16 Jun 2026	609	49.1	18.2	32.7	30.9
ICS/ISCTE	15–24 May 2026	803	52.3	17.9	29.8	34.4
Intercampus	8–14 May 2026	606	44.1	18.3	37.6	25.8
Aximage	10–15 Apr 2026	500	69	16	15	53
Intercampus	8–14 Apr 2026	608	46.4	17.8	35.8	28.6

== See also ==
- Opinion polling for the 2026 Portuguese presidential election
