= Bernard Yang =

Bernard Yang may refer to:

- Bernard Yeung (Chinese: 楊賢, born 1953), Hong Kong-American economist
- Bernard Yeoh (Chinese: 楊清漢, born 1969), Malaysian-British sport shooter
