= Ray Young =

Ray Young may refer to:

- Ray Young (executive) (born 1962), chief financial officer of Archer Daniels Midland Company
- Ray Young (Australian politician) (1938–2000), member of the Western Australian Legislative Assembly
- Ray Young (Oklahoma politician) (born 1953), American politician from Oklahoma
- W. Rae Young (1915–2008), Bell Labs engineer, co-inventor of the cell phone
- Ray Young (footballer) (1934–2022), English footballer
- Ray Young (baseball), former Stanford Cardinal baseball coach
- Ray Young (actor) (1940–1999), American actor known from Genesis II, Chapter Two or Return of the Beverly Hillbillies

== See also ==
- Nickolas Ray Young, American actor and firefighter
