= Chookaszian =

Chookaszian (Armenian: Չուգասզյան) is an Armenian surname. Notable people with the surname include:

- Dennis H. Chookaszian, American businessman
- Levon Chookaszian (born 1952), Armenian art historian
