= Hedonic damages =

Hedonic damages is a legal term that first emerged in 1985 in the research of Stan V. Smith, who was a PhD student in economics at the University of Chicago. The term refers to damages for loss of enjoyment of life, the intangible value of life, as distinct from the human capital value or lost earnings value.

== History ==
Hedonic damages was used in a legal case for the first time in 1987 in the case of Sherrod v. Berry, 827 F.2d 195 (7th Cir. 1987). and testified as an expert witness in regards to the amount of the hedonic award, the first such testimony proffered nationwide. It has since been used in additional legal decisions, in law review articles, and in law and economics articles in the United States. See for example Professor Cass Sunstein's University of Chicago Law & Economics, Olin Working Paper No. 340, July 2007. The concept of hedonic damages has been admitted in testimony in state and federal courts. Research on the implications of hedonic damages theory has been published in various peer-reviewed journal articles. Dr. Smith co-authored the first textbook on hedonic damages in 1990, published by Anderson Publishing, Ohio.

== Application ==
Hedonic damages, the loss of the value of life, are allowed in almost every state in a non-fatal injury case. Based on William Daubert et al. v. Merrell Dow Pharmaceuticals, Inc., and other admissibility tests, many but not all jurisdictions allow economic expert witness testimony on hedonic damages. For example, the Nevada Supreme Court unanimously approved of such testimony in Banks v. Sunrise Hospital, 120 Nev. 822, 102 P.3d 52 (2004). Similarly, the 4th Appellate District in Ohio allowed such testimony based on Daubert in Lewis v. Alfa Leval, 128 Ohio App.3d.200 (1998). The Court of appeals in the Lewis case held that the trial judge properly ruled that the testimony met the Daubert standards, and that it was within the discretion of the trial court to have admitted hedonic damages testimony. The measurement of hedonic damages is based on some 40 years of extensive, well-accepted, peer-reviewed, economic research on the value of a statistical life (VSL). This measurement is controversial among forensic economists. The Value of Statistical Life literature is accepted by most forensic economists, including those few economists who oppose the admission of hedonic damages testimony. Many courts nationwide have allowed such testimony but judges have significant discretion as to its admissibility. Economists generally agree that the VSL is in the $4 million to $5 million range. This value is an average of many published results based on economic research using the willingness-to-pay model. Hedonic damages are not allowed in death cases in the great majority of the states. Some states do allow recovery in wrongful death cases, including New Hampshire, New Mexico, Georgia, Arkansas, Connecticut, Hawaii, and in Federal Section 1983 civil rights violation actions.

Hedonic damages also can apply in cases that involve no injury. Cases involving inmates wrongfully imprisoned have been won with Hedonic Damages approaches. Such were the plights of two former inmates, William Gregory and David Pope, convicted and later exonerated on rape charges. William Gregory, who served seven years in a Kentucky prison, received a $4.5 million settlement, while David Pope, who served 15 years in Texas, received $385,000. While the inmates were free, according to David Hunt, another inmate later freed after serving 18 years, "we're still living the nightmare every day". Hedonic damages attempt to compensate for that suffering with settlements.

A person injured after falling from a defective chair was able to recover hedonic damages.

== Controversy ==
Economic testimony regarding hedonic damages has been allowed in over two-thirds of the states and two-thirds of the Federal District courts and has been endorsed in unanimous supreme court decisions in Nevada, New Mexico, and Mississippi and in appellate decisions in Ohio. In some states where trial judges have admitted the economic testimony a trial judge in another court may have not admitted the testimony. The same holds true for Federal Circuit courts. Undeterred by a unanimous Supreme Court decision endorsing hedonic damages testimony by an expert economist, The Mississippi legislature subsequently adopted tort reform that precludes loss of enjoyment of life testimony by economic experts. There is significant scholarship endorsing hedonic damages in personal injury and wrongful death cases. Further, hedonic damages were allowed as an element of recovery in the September 11, 2001 Victim Recovery Fund. Although the category of non-economic damages normally included in hedonic damage testimony was acknowledged when identifying and determining compensation for the victims of the September 11, 2001 attacks, the final determinations were not based on the methods or arguments normally presented by those experts who calculate and testify regarding hedonic damages.

== Willingness-to-pay model ==
The willingness-to-pay model is based on measuring what people pay for safety that results in small reductions in their risk of death. For example, if average people are willing to pay $25 for a carbon monoxide detector that stands a one in two hundred thousand chance of saving their life, the model would imply that such purchasers value their life at $5 million ($25 times 200,000). Economists generally use circumstances involving small risk reductions, recognizing that measuring willingness-to-pay using larger risks will significantly increase the value of a statistical life.

== See also ==
- Damages
- Hedonology
- Measure of damages under English law
- Pain and suffering
- Pro-rata
- Punitive damages
- Pure economic loss
