= Opinion polling for the 2026 Portuguese presidential election =

In the run up to the 2026 Portuguese presidential election, various organisations will carry out opinion polling to gauge voting intention in Portugal. Results of such polls are displayed in this article.

Poll results are listed in the table below in reverse chronological order, showing the most recent first. The highest percentage figure in each polling survey is displayed in bold, and the background shaded in the leading candidate colour. In the instance that there is a tie, then no figure is shaded but both are displayed in bold. If no candidate gets the required majority in a survey, the second place gets highlighted with a lighter color. Poll results use the date the survey's fieldwork was done, as opposed to the date of publication.

== Candidates vote ==
=== First round ===
==== Graphical summary ====
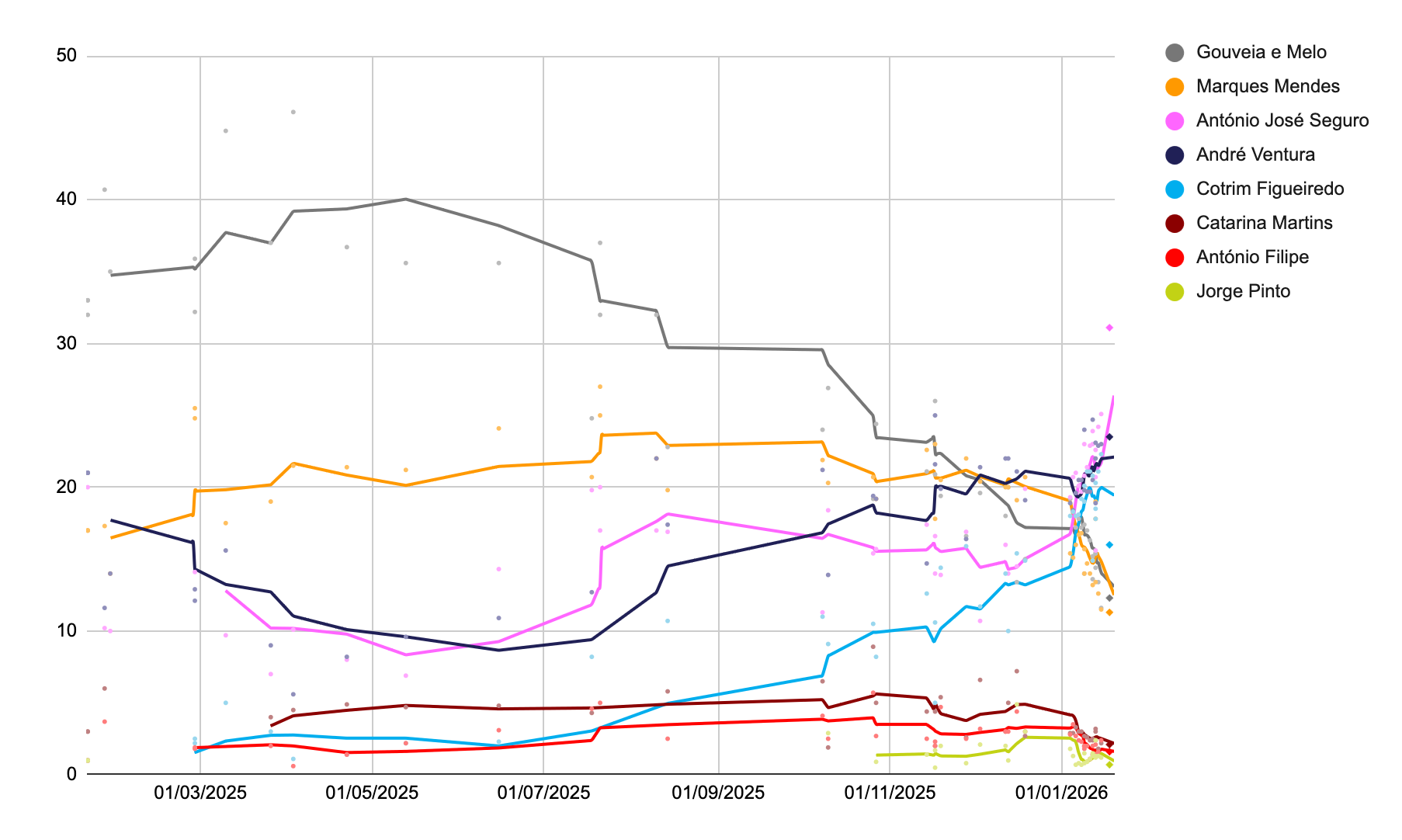
Graph of the polling for the 2026 Portuguese presidential election.

==== Polling ====
Polls that show their results without distributing those respondents who are undecided or said they would abstain from voting, are re-calculated by removing these numbers from the totals through a simple rule of three, in order to obtain results comparable to other polls and the official election results.

Exit poll

Polling firm	Fieldwork date	Sample size	Gouveia e Melo	Marques Mendes	António José Seguro	André Ventura	Cotrim Figueiredo	Catarina Martins	António Filipe	Jorge Pinto	André Pestana	Manuel João Vieira	Humberto Correia	Oth	Lead
Polling firm	Fieldwork date	Sample size	Ind.	PSD	PS	CH	IL	BE	CDU	L	Ind.	Ind.	Ind.	Oth	Lead
**First round**	18 Jan 2026	—N/a	12.3	11.3	**31.1**	23.5	16.0	2.1	1.6	0.7	0.2	1.1	0.1	—N/a	**7.6**
CESOP–UCP	18 Jan 2026	31,221	11– 14	8– 11	**30–** **35**	20– 24	17– 21	1– 3	1– 3	0– 1	0– 1	1– 2	0– 1	—N/a	10– 11
ICS/ISCTE/Pitagórica	18 Jan 2026	28,522	9.2– 12.4	9.1– 12.3	**30.8–** **35.2**	19.9– 24.1	16.3– 20.1	0.9– 2.7	0.4– 2.0	—N/a	—N/a	0.7– 2.3	—N/a	—N/a	10.9– 11.1
Intercampus	18 Jan 2026	18,411	10.9– 14.9	8.3– 12.3	**29.6–** **33.6**	21.0– 25.0	13.9– 17.9	0.8– 3.8	0.6– 2.6	0.0– 1.7	—N/a	0.4– 2.4	—N/a	—N/a	8.6
Pitagórica (Note: Daily tracking poll)	13–15 Jan 2026	1,200	11.6	11.5	**25.1**	23.0	22.3	2.2	2.4	1.2	—N/a	0.6	—N/a	0.1	2.1
Pitagórica	12–14 Jan 2026	903	13.4	12.6	**24.2**	22.9	21.1	1.8	1.6	1.3	—N/a	1.0	—N/a	0.1	1.3
Pitagórica	11–13 Jan 2026	755	15.4	13.4	**22.6**	22.0	20.3	2.4	1.4	1.3	—N/a	1.0	—N/a	0.2	0.6
Intercampus (Note: Results presented here exclude undecideds (19.6%). With their inclusion results are: André Ventura: 18.6%; Marques Mendes: 15.3%; Cotrim Figueiredo: 14.3%; António José Seguro: 12.5%; Gouveia e Melo: 12.3%; Catarina Martins: 2.6%; Jorge Pinto: 1.9%; António Filipe: 1.7%; Manuel João Vieira: 1.2%; Others: 0.0%.)	6–13 Jan 2026	806	15.4	19.0	15.6	**23.1**	17.8	3.2	2.1	2.4	—N/a	1.5	—N/a	—N/a	4.1
Consulmark2	5–13 Jan 2026	993	14.4	17.8	**20.7**	18.9	18.5	3.0	1.4	1.2	—N/a	1.0	—N/a	3.2	1.8
Pitagórica	10–12 Jan 2026	608	15.2	13.2	**23.9**	20.5	20.8	2.5	1.4	1.3	—N/a	1.0	—N/a	0.2	3.1
Aximage	9–12 Jan 2026	606	13.6	14.9	23.0	**24.7**	14.9	2.4	2.0	1.5	—N/a	—N/a	—N/a	3.0	1.7
Pitagórica	9–11 Jan 2026	608	16.3	14.0	**22.9**	19.7	21.1	2.4	1.1	1.1	—N/a	1.1	—N/a	0.3	1.8
Pitagórica	8–10 Jan 2026	608	17.0	14.5	**21.4**	19.7	21.1	2.6	2.0	0.9	—N/a	0.7	—N/a	0.1	0.3
CESOP–UCP	6–9 Jan 2025	1,770	14	14	23	**24**	19	2	2	1.5	<1	<1	<1	—N/a	1
Pitagórica	7–9 Jan 2026	608	17.4	15.7	**20.8**	19.8	20.1	2.7	1.8	0.8	—N/a	0.6	—N/a	0.3	0.7
Pitagórica	6–8 Jan 2026	608	17.2	16.8	19.7	**20.5**	19.2	3.0	2.3	0.7	—N/a	0.3	—N/a	0.3	0.8
Pitagórica	5–7 Jan 2026	608	17.8	16.7	20.1	**20.5**	18.1	3.0	2.4	0.8	—N/a	0.4	—N/a	0.3	0.4
Pitagórica	4–6 Jan 2026	608	17.2	16.0	**21.0**	19.6	18.0	3.3	2.7	0.7	—N/a	1.0	—N/a	0.5	1.4
Aximage	1–6 Jan 2026	800	17.3	18.3	16.8	**24.6**	14.4	3.3	1.7	1.2	—N/a	—N/a	—N/a	2.4	6.3
Pitagórica	3–5 Jan 2026	608	18.3	15.1	**20.7**	18.4	18.3	2.9	3.5	1.3	—N/a	1.3	—N/a	0.2	2.3
Pitagórica	2–4 Jan 2026	608	19.2	15.4	**19.3**	18.9	18.0	2.9	2.8	1.8	—N/a	1.5	—N/a	0.2	0.1
Pitagórica	11–19 Dec 2025	1,000	15.0	**20.7**	19.9	19.1	14.9	2.7	3.0	3.0	—N/a	1.1	—N/a	0.6	0.8
Intercampus (Note: Results presented here exclude undecideds (11.6%). With their inclusion results are: André Ventura: 18.7%; Marques Mendes: 16.9%; Cotrim Figueiredo: 13.6%; António José Seguro: 12.8%; Gouveia e Melo: 11.9%; Catarina Martins: 7.2%; Jorge Pinto: 4.3%; António Filipe: 3.9%.)	12–16 Dec 2025	611	13.4	19.1	14.5	**21.1**	15.4	7.2	4.4	4.9	—N/a	—N/a	—N/a	—N/a	2.0
ICS/ISCTE	5–13 Dec 2025	903	20	20	14	**22**	10	5	3	1	—N/a	—N/a	—N/a	5 (Note: Joana Amaral Dias: 2%; Others: 3%.)	2
CESOP–UCP	4–12 Dec 2025	1,185	18	20	16	**22**	14	3	3	2	—N/a	0.5	—N/a	1.5	2
Aximage (Note: Results presented here exclude undecideds (10.6%). With their inclusion results are: André Ventura: 19.1%; Marques Mendes: 18.2%; Gouveia e Melo: 17.5%; Cotrim Figueiredo: 10.5%; António José Seguro: 9.6%; Catarina Martins: 5.9%; António Filipe: 2.9%; Jorge Pinto: 1.9%; Others/Invalid: 3.8%.)	28 Nov–3 Dec 2025	607	19.6	20.4	10.7	**21.4**	11.7	6.6	3.2	2.1	—N/a	—N/a	—N/a	4.3	1.0
Consulmark2	19–28 Nov 2025	795	16.6	**22.0**	16.9	16.4	15.9	2.6	2.5	0.8	—N/a	—N/a	—N/a	6.3	5.1
Intercampus (Note: Results presented here exclude undecideds (20.0%). With their inclusion results are: Marques Mendes: 16.4%; André Ventura: 15.9%; Gouveia e Melo: 15.5%; Cotrim Figueiredo: 11.5%; António José Seguro: 11.1%; Catarina Martins: 4.3%; António Filipe: 3.8%; Jorge Pinto: 1.6%.)	14–19 Nov 2025	611	19.4	**20.5**	13.9	19.9	14.4	5.4	4.7	2.0	—N/a	—N/a	—N/a	—N/a	0.6
Aximage (Note: Results presented here exclude undecideds (10.6%). With their inclusion results are: André Ventura: 19.4%; Gouveia e Melo: 18.7%; Marques Mendes: 15.9%; António José Seguro: 14.8%; Cotrim Figueiredo: 9.5%; Catarina Martins: 3.9%; António Filipe: 2.1%; Jorge Pinto: 1.5%; Others/Invalid: 3.6%.)	10–17 Nov 2025	816	20.9	17.8	16.6	**21.6**	10.6	4.4	2.3	1.7	—N/a	—N/a	—N/a	4.1	0.7
ICS/ISCTE	7–17 Nov 2025	807	**26**	23	14	25	5	2	2	<1	—N/a	—N/a	—N/a	3 (Note: Joana Amaral Dias: <1%; Others: 3%.)	1
Pitagórica	5–14 Nov 2025	1,000	21.1	**22.6**	17.4	14.7	12.6	4.4	2.5	1.4	—N/a	—N/a	—N/a	3.3 (Note: Joana Amaral Dias: 0.2%; Others: 3.1%.)	1.5
Aximage	23–27 Oct 2025	651	**24.4**	19.2	15.7	19.2	8.2	5.0	2.7	0.9	—N/a	—N/a	—N/a	4.6	5.2
Intercampus (Note: Results presented here exclude undecideds (19.9%). With their inclusion results are: Marques Mendes: 16.6%; André Ventura: 15.8%; Gouveia e Melo: 15.4%; António José Seguro: 12.3%; Cotrim Figueiredo: 8.4%; Catarina Martins: 7.1%; António Filipe: 4.6%.)	20–26 Oct 2025	609	19.2	**20.7**	15.4	19.7	10.5	8.9	5.7	—N/a	—N/a	—N/a	—N/a	—N/a	1.0
Pitagórica	6–10 Oct 2025	625	**26.9**	20.3	18.4	13.9	9.1	1.9	2.5	2.9 (RT)	0.2	—N/a	—N/a	3.9 (Note: Joana Amaral Dias - 0.4%; Pedro Tinoco de Faria - 0.4%; Others/Neither/Would not vote - 3.1%.)	6.6
Intercampus (Note: Results presented here exclude undecideds (9.9%). With their inclusion results are: Gouveia e Melo: 21.6%; Marques Mendes: 19.7%; André Ventura: 19.1%; António José Seguro: 10.2%; Cotrim Figueiredo: 9.9%; Catarina Martins: 5.9%; António Filipe: 3.7%.)	1–8 Oct 2025	802	**24.0**	21.9	11.3	21.2	11.0	6.5	4.1	—N/a	—N/a	—N/a	—N/a	—N/a	2.1
Intercampus (Note: Results presented here exclude undecideds (19.0%). With their inclusion results are: Gouveia e Melo: 18.5%; Marques Mendes: 16.0%; André Ventura: 14.1%; António José Seguro: 13.7%; Cotrim Figueiredo: 8.7%; Catarina Martins: 4.7%; Rui Moreira: 3.3%; António Filipe: 2.0%.)	7–14 Aug 2025	611	**22.8**	19.8	16.9	17.4	10.7	5.8	2.5	—N/a	—N/a	—N/a	—N/a	4.1 (Note: Rui Moreira – 4.1%.)	3.0
ICS/ISCTE (Note: Results presented here exclude undecideds (24%), Invalid/Blank (4%) and Would not vote (12%). With their inclusion results are: Gouveia e Melo: 19%; Marques Mendes: 13%; André Ventura: 13%; António José Seguro: 10%; Others: 6%.)	28 Jun–10 Aug 2025	2,017	**32**	22	17	22	—N/a	—N/a	—N/a	—N/a	—N/a	—N/a	—N/a	7	6
Aximage (Note: Results presented here exclude undecideds (29%). With their inclusion results are: Gouveia e Melo: 26%; Marques Mendes: 19%; André Ventura: 14%; Others: 12%.)	11–21 Jul 2025	1,000	**37**	27	20	—N/a	—N/a	—N/a	—N/a	—N/a	—N/a	—N/a	—N/a	16	10
Aximage	11–21 Jul 2025	1,000	**32**	25	17	—N/a	—N/a	—N/a	5	—N/a	—N/a	—N/a	—N/a	21 (Note: Results presented here exclude undecideds (24%). With their inclusion results are: Gouveia e Melo: 24%; Marques Mendes: 19%; André Ventura: 13%; António Sampaio da Nóvoa: 6%; António Filipe: 4%; Joana Amaral Dias: 4%; Other candidates: 6%.)	7
Intercampus (Note: Results presented here exclude undecideds (16.8%). With their inclusion results are: Gouveia e Melo: 20.6%; Marques Mendes: 17.2%; António José Seguro: 16.5%; André Ventura: 10.6%; Cotrim Figueiredo: 6.8%; António Sampaio da Nóvoa: 4.1%; António Filipe: 3.8%; Mariana Mortágua: 3.6%.)	11–18 Jul 2025	606	**24.8**	20.7	19.8	12.7	8.2	4.3 (MM)	4.6	—N/a	—N/a	—N/a	—N/a	4.9 (Note: António Sampaio da Nóvoa - 4.9%.)	4.1
Intercampus (Note: Results presented here exclude undecideds (23.3%). With their inclusion results are: Gouveia e Melo: 27.3%; Marques Mendes: 18.5%; António José Seguro: 11.0%; André Ventura: 8.4%; Mariana Mortágua: 3.7%; António Sampaio da Nóvoa: 3.6%; Paulo Raimundo: 2.4%; Mariana Leitão: 1.8%.)	5–15 Jun 2025	616	**35.6**	24.1	14.3	10.9	2.3 (ML)	4.8 (MM)	3.1 (PR)	—N/a	—N/a	—N/a	—N/a	4.9 (Note: António Sampaio da Nóvoa - 4.9%.)	11.4
Consulmark2 (Note: Results presented here exclude undecideds (15.1%) abstention (2.4%) Refused to answer (2.7%) and Blank/Invalid (1.9%). With their inclusion results are: Gouveia e Melo: 27.7%; Marques Mendes: 16.5%; André Ventura: 7.5%; António Vitorino: 6.1%; António José Seguro: 5.4%; Paulo Portas: 3.9%; Catarina Martins: 3.7%; Joana Amaral Dias: 2.2%; Paulo Raimundo: 1.7%; Mariana Leitão: 1.7%.; Tim Vieira: 0.2%; Other: 1.4%.)	6–13 May 2025	589	**35.6**	21.2	6.9	9.6	2.2 (ML)	4.7	2.2 (PR)	—N/a	—N/a	—N/a	—N/a	17.6 (Note: António Vitorino - 7.8%; Paulo Portas - 5.0%; Joana Amaral Dias - 2.8%; Tim Vieira - 0.3%; Other - 1.8%.)	14.4
Consulmark2 (Note: Results presented here exclude undecideds (13.9%) abstention (2.3%) Refused to answer (1.6%) and Blank/Invalid (3.2%). With their inclusion results are: Gouveia e Melo: 29.0%; Marques Mendes: 16.9%; André Ventura: 6.5%; António José Seguro: 6.3%; António Vitorino: 5.6%; Paulo Portas: 5.6%; Catarina Martins: 3.9%; Joana Amaral Dias: 1.4%; Paulo Raimundo: 1.1%; Mariana Leitão: 1.1%.; Tim Vieira: 0.7%; Other: 1.1%.)	14–22 Apr 2025	569	**36.7**	21.4	8.0	8.2	1.4 (ML)	4.9	1.4 (PR)	—N/a	—N/a	—N/a	—N/a	18.0 (Note: António Vitorino - 7.1%; Paulo Portas - 7.1%; Joana Amaral Dias - 1.8%; Tim Vieira - 0.9%; Other - 1.4%.)	15.3
Consulmark2 (Note: Results presented here exclude undecideds (13.7%) abstention (1.0%) Refused to answer (1.4%) and Blank/Invalid (3.8%). With their inclusion results are: Gouveia e Melo: 36.9%; Marques Mendes: 17.2%; António José Seguro: 8.1%; Paulo Portas: 5.8%; André Ventura: 4.5%; Catarina Martins: 3.6%; Joana Amaral Dias: 0.9%; Mariana Leitão: 0.9%; Paulo Raimundo: 0.5%; Tim Vieira: 0.2%; Other: 1.7%.)	27 Mar–3 Apr 2025	583	**46.1**	21.5	10.1	5.6	1.1 (ML)	4.5	0.6 (PR)	—N/a	—N/a	—N/a	—N/a	10.5 (Note: Paulo Portas - 7.2%; Joana Amaral Dias - 1.1%; Tim Vieira - 0.3%; Other: 2.1%.)	24.6
CESOP–UCP	17–26 Mar 2025	1,206	**37**	19	7	9	3 (ML)	4	2 (PR)	—N/a	—N/a	—N/a	—N/a	19 (Note: António Vitorino - 7%; António Sampaio da Nóvoa - 3%; Others - 9%.)	18
Intercampus (Note: Results presented here exclude undecideds (20.6%). With their inclusion results are: Gouveia e Melo: 35.6%; Marques Mendes: 13.9%; André Ventura: 12.4%; António José Seguro: 7.7%; António Vitorino: 5.6%; Mariana Leitão: 4.0%.)	4–10 Mar 2025	638	**44.8**	17.5	9.7	15.6	5.0 (ML)	—N/a	—N/a	—N/a	—N/a	—N/a	—N/a	7.4 (Note: António Vitorino – 7.1%.)	27.3
Pitagórica	23–27 Feb 2025	400	**35.9**	25.5	14.1	12.9	2.5 (ML)	—N/a	1.8 (JS)	—N/a	0.6	—N/a	—N/a	6.4 (Note: António Sampaio da Nóvoa - 4.9%; Inês Sousa Real - 0.9%; Tim Vieira - 0.6%; Joana Amaral Dias - 0.3%.)	10.4
Pitagórica	23–27 Feb 2025	400	**32.2**	24.8	—N/a	12.1	2.2 (ML)	—N/a	1.9 (JS)	—N/a	0.7	—N/a	—N/a	26.1 (Note: António Vitorino - 20.7%; António Sampaio da Nóvoa - 3.8%; Inês Sousa Real - 0.7%; Tim Vieira - 0.6%; Joana Amaral Dias - 0.2%.)	7.4
Aximage (Note: Results presented here exclude undecideds (20%). With their inclusion results are: Gouveia e Melo: 35%; António Vitorino: 12%; Marques Mendes: 11%; André Ventura: 11%; Durão Barroso: 9%; António José Seguro: 8%.)	23–28 Jan 2025	800	**35**	14	10	14	—N/a	—N/a	—N/a	—N/a	—N/a	—N/a	—N/a	27 (Note: António Vitorino - 15%; Durão Barroso- 11%.)	20
Intercampus (Note: Results presented here exclude undecideds (18.7%). With their inclusion results are: Gouveia e Melo: 33.1%; Marques Mendes: 14.1%; André Ventura: 9.4%; António Vitorino: 8.6%; António José Seguro: 8.3%; Mariana Leitão: 4.9%; João Ferreira: 3.0%.)	21–26 Jan 2025	638	**40.7**	17.3	10.2	11.6	—N/a	6.0	3.7 (JF)	—N/a	—N/a	—N/a	—N/a	10.5 (Note: António Vitorino - 10.5%.)	23.4
ICS/ISCTE	9–20 Jan 2025	805	**33**	17	20	21	1 (IL)	1 (BE)	1 (PCP)	1 (L)	—N/a	—N/a	—N/a	5 (Note: Results presented here exclude undecideds (25%). With their inclusion results are: Gouveia e Melo: 25%; André Ventura: 16%; António José Seguro: 15% Marques Mendes: 13%; IL candidate: 1%; BE candidate: 1%; PCP candidate: 1%; Livre candidate: 1%; Other Independent candidate: 1%; CDS candidate: 0%; PAN candidate: 0%;)	12
ICS/ISCTE	9–20 Jan 2025	805	**33**	17	—N/a	21	1 (IL)	3 (BE)	1 (PCP)	1 (L)	—N/a	—N/a	—N/a	23 (Note: Results presented here exclude undecideds (25%). With their inclusion results are: Gouveia e Melo: 25%; André Ventura: 16%; António Vitorino: 14%; Marques Mendes: 13%; BE candidate: 2%; IL candidate: 1%; PCP candidate: 1%; Livre candidate: 1%; Other Independent candidate: 1%; CDS candidate: 0%; PAN candidate: 0%;)	12
ICS/ISCTE	9–20 Jan 2025	805	**32**	17	—N/a	21	1 (IL)	3 (BE)	1 (PCP)	1 (L)	—N/a	—N/a	—N/a	24 (Note: Results presented here exclude undecideds (24%). With their inclusion results are: Gouveia e Melo: 24%; Mário Centeno - 17%; André Ventura: 16%; Marques Mendes: 13%; BE candidate: 2%; IL candidate: 1%; PCP candidate: 1%; Livre candidate: 1%; Other Independent candidate: 1%; CDS candidate: 0%; PAN candidate: 0%;)	10

Polling before confirmed candidates, with several options

Polling firm	Fieldwork date	Sample size	Gouveia e Melo	António Costa	Passos Coelho	Paulo Portas	Marques Mendes	Mariana Mortágua	Catarina Martins	Santos Silva	André Ventura	João Ferreira	Paulo Raimundo	Ana Gomes	Cotrim Figueiredo	Durão Barroso	António Guterres	António José Seguro	Mário Centeno	Santana Lopes	Rui Tavares	O/ U	Lead
Polling firm	Fieldwork date	Sample size	Ind.	PS	PSD	CDS	PSD	BE	BE	PS	CH	CDU	CDU	PS	IL	PSD	PS	PS	PS	Ind.	L	O/ U	Lead
Intercampus	21–27 Nov 2024	605	**23.2**	—N/a	13.9	—N/a	9.8	—N/a	4.0	—N/a	6.6	—N/a	0.9	5.1	3.2	3.2	—N/a	4.7	6.4	1.3	2.4	15.3	9.3
Aximage	6–19 Sep 2024	818	**21.0**	—N/a	14.7	—N/a	10.6	—N/a	—N/a	5.0	8.8	—N/a	—N/a	7.9	—N/a	—N/a	—N/a	—N/a	8.3	—N/a	—N/a	23.7	6.3
Intercampus	19–26 Jul 2024	609	9.4	—N/a	14.1	4.6	8.1	8.4	—N/a	—N/a	11.4	—N/a	1.5	5.7	4.8	—N/a	**19.3**	—N/a	4.6	2.4	—N/a	5.7 (Note: Leonor Beleza - 0.9%; Others/Neither/Would not vote - 4.8%.)	5.2
Duplimétrica	6–13 May 2024	800	10	**17**	13	5	7	—N/a	2	—N/a	5	—N/a	—N/a	3	—N/a	5	13	—N/a	5	—N/a	—N/a	15	4
Intercampus	18–23 Apr 2024	605	8.4	**14.7**	12.5	2.7	5.7	—N/a	5.9	—N/a	7.7	—N/a	1.3	5.3	2.7	2.9	13.6	—N/a	2.9	1.3	3.5	9.0	1.1
Intercampus	9–14 Sep 2023	614	7.8	8.8	**15.8**	3.9	6.0	—N/a	5.5	1.5	9.0	—N/a	2.0	3.4	3.3	3.1	14.8	—N/a	3.9	2.0	—N/a	9.3	1.0
Intercampus	3–6 Jul 2023	623	7.9	14.3	13.3	3.2	3.0	—N/a	6.9	1.4	11.4	—N/a	0.8	5.9	3.2	—N/a	**15.1**	2.7	2.6	1.9	—N/a	6.3	0.8
Intercampus	3–10 Feb 2023	602	10.0	10.6	**15.8**	—N/a	3.8	4.3	—N/a	3.8	9.5	—N/a	—N/a	6.0	3.8	4.0	13.5	—N/a	—N/a	—N/a	—N/a	14.9 (Note: Rui Moreira- 4.7%; Francisco Assis - 0.5%; Others/Neither/Would not vote - 9.7%.)	2.3
Intercampus (Note: Voters were asked which candidate they prefer.)	15–20 Nov 2022	605	**15.9**	9.6	15.2	6.3	7.3	4.0	—N/a	5.8	6.1	3.3	—N/a	8.6	2.1	—N/a	—N/a	—N/a	—N/a	—N/a	—N/a	15.8	0.7
Intercampus	6–11 Jul 2022	605	**31.7**	—N/a	—N/a	10.9	10.4	7.8	—N/a	7.8	6.1	3.0	—N/a	—N/a	—N/a	—N/a	—N/a	—N/a	—N/a	—N/a	—N/a	22.3	20.8
Intercampus	6–11 Jul 2022	605	—N/a	—N/a	—N/a	**18.3**	17.4	12.7	—N/a	12.2	—N/a	4.5	—N/a	—N/a	—N/a	—N/a	—N/a	—N/a	—N/a	—N/a	—N/a	34.9	0.9
Intercampus	6–11 Jul 2022	605	—N/a	**31.1**	—N/a	13.6	16.2	7.8	—N/a	—N/a	—N/a	4.0	—N/a	—N/a	—N/a	—N/a	—N/a	—N/a	—N/a	—N/a	—N/a	27.4	14.9
Intercampus	6–11 Jul 2022	605	—N/a	—N/a	**23.1**	—N/a	16.5	12.9	—N/a	12.4	—N/a	4.5	—N/a	—N/a	—N/a	—N/a	—N/a	—N/a	—N/a	—N/a	—N/a	30.6	6.6

=== Second round ===
Poll results are shown in the table below in reverse chronological order, showing the most recent first.

Exit poll

Polling firm	Fieldwork date	Sample size	Seguro	Ventura	Oth/ Und	Lead
Polling firm	Fieldwork date	Sample size	PS	CH	Oth/ Und	Lead
**Second round**	8 Feb 2026	—N/a	**66.8**	33.2	—N/a	**33.6**
CESOP–UCP	8 Feb 2026	40,526	**68–** **73**	27– 32	—N/a	36– 46
ICS/ISCTE/Pitagórica	8 Feb 2026	26,584	**67.0–** **71.4**	28.6– 33.0	—N/a	34.0– 42.8
Intercampus	8 Feb 2026	12,665	**66.8–** **71.8**	28.2– 33.2	—N/a	33.6– 43.6
Pitagórica	3–5 Feb 2026	810 (Note: Poll numbers with the undecided excluded.)	**67.8**	32.2	—N/a	35.6
Pitagórica	3–5 Feb 2026	810 (Note: Poll numbers with the undecided included.)	**56.7**	26.9	16.4	29.8
Pitagórica	2–4 Feb 2026	608	**53.5**	28.0	18.5	25.5
Pitagórica	1–3 Feb 2026	608	**53.2**	29.5	17.3	23.7
Pitagórica	31 Jan–2 Feb 2026	608	**52.8**	28.1	19.1	24.7
CESOP–UCP	29 Jan–2 Feb 2026	1,601	**67**	33	—N/a	34
CESOP–UCP	29 Jan–2 Feb 2026	1,601	**56**	25	19	31
Aximage	29 Jan–2 Feb 2026	607	**65.4**	30.3	4.4	35.1
Pitagórica	30 Jan–1 Feb 2026	608	**53.6**	27.9	18.5	25.7
Pitagórica	29–31 Jan 2026	608	**56.2**	28.4	15.4	27.8
Pitagórica	28–30 Jan 2026	608	**57.3**	27.2	15.5	30.1
Pitagórica	27–29 Jan 2026	608	**57.8**	27.3	14.9	30.5
Pitagórica	26–28 Jan 2026	608	**59.0**	28.0	13.0	31.0
Pitagórica	25–27 Jan 2026	608	**61.9**	26.2	11.9	35.7
Pitagórica	24–26 Jan 2026	608	**60.9**	26.5	12.6	34.4
Aximage	21–26 Jan 2026	800	**64.6**	30.8	4.6	33.8
ICS/ISCTE	20–25 Jan 2026	902	**66**	34	—N/a	32
ICS/ISCTE	20–25 Jan 2026	902	**51**	27	22	24
CESOP–UCP	20–21 Jan 2026	1,102	**70**	30	—N/a	40
CESOP–UCP	20–21 Jan 2026	1,102	**61**	27	12	34
Intercampus	19–21 Jan 2026	609	**60.8**	24.5	14.8	36.3
Pitagórica	13–15 Jan 2026	1,200	**66**	27	7	39
Pitagórica	12–14 Jan 2026	903	**67**	26	7	41
Pitagórica	11–13 Jan 2026	755	**66**	25	9	41
Intercampus	6–13 Jan 2026	806	**57.1**	32.4	10.5	24.7
Consulmark2	5–13 Jan 2026	993	**60.5**	25.6	13.9	34.9
Aximage	9–12 Jan 2026	606	**49**	29	22	20
Aximage	1–6 Jan 2026	800	**42**	30	28	12
Pitagórica	11–19 Dec 2025	1,000	**65**	23	12	42
Intercampus	12–16 Dec 2025	611	**52.2**	33.6	14.2	18.6
ICS/ISCTE	5–13 Dec 2025	903	**45**	24	31	21
CESOP–UCP	4–12 Dec 2025	1,185	**66**	29	5	37
Consulmark2	19–28 Nov 2025	795	**60.1**	21.4	18.5	38.7
Intercampus	14–19 Nov 2025	611	**53.0**	28.5	18.5	24.5
ICS/ISCTE	7–17 Nov 2025	807	**42**	25	33	17
Pitagórica	5–14 Nov 2025	1,000	**67**	21	12	46
Aximage	23–27 Oct 2025	651	**56**	26	18	30
Intercampus	20–26 Oct 2025	609	**58.5**	29.9	11.6	28.6
Pitagórica	6–10 Oct 2025	625	**61**	21	18	40
Intercampus	1–8 Oct 2025	802	**54.9**	29.8	15.3	25.1
Intercampus	7–14 Aug 2025	611	**52.0**	29.5	18.5	22.5
Pitagórica	23–27 Feb 2025	400	**65**	18	17	47

==== Other scenarios ====
Poll results showing how people would vote on hypothetical second round matchups, are shown in the table below in reverse chronological order, showing the most recent first

Polling firm	Fieldwork date	Sample size	Gouveia e Melo	Marques Mendes	Oth/ Und	Lead
Polling firm	Fieldwork date	Sample size	Ind.	PSD	Oth/ Und	Lead
Pitagórica	13–15 Jan 2026	1,200	**44**	42	14	2
Pitagórica	12–14 Jan 2026	903	**45**	42	13	3
Pitagórica	11–13 Jan 2026	755	**44**	42	14	2
Intercampus	6–13 Jan 2026	806	37.7	**38.8**	23.4	1.1
Consulmark2	5–13 Jan 2026	993	40.1	**40.9**	19.0	0.8
Aximage	1–6 Jan 2026	800	**33**	30	37	3
Pitagórica	11–19 Dec 2025	1,000	34	**47**	19	13
Intercampus	12–16 Dec 2025	611	36.7	**41.7**	21.6	5.0
ICS/ISCTE	5–13 Dec 2025	903	31	**35**	34	4
CESOP–UCP	4–12 Dec 2025	1,185	42	**50**	8	8
Consulmark2	19–28 Nov 2025	795	34.0	**46.0**	20.0	12.0
Intercampus	14–19 Nov 2025	611	36.7	**37.5**	25.8	0.8
ICS/ISCTE	7–17 Nov 2025	807	**35**	31	34	4
Pitagórica	5–14 Nov 2025	1,000	39	**46**	15	7
Aximage	23–27 Oct 2025	651	**38**	36	26	2
Intercampus	20–26 Oct 2025	609	37.3	**41.5**	21.2	4.2
Pitagórica	6–10 Oct 2025	625	**42**	37	21	5
Intercampus	1–8 Oct 2025	802	**40.6**	39.3	20.1	1.3
Intercampus	7–14 Aug 2025	611	**39.8**	38.5	21.8	1.3
Aximage	11–21 Jul 2025	1,000	**41**	36	23	5
Intercampus	11–18 Jul 2025	606	**40.4**	39.6	20.0	0.8
Intercampus	5–15 Jun 2025	616	**41.1**	35.4	23.5	5.7
Intercampus	4–10 Mar 2025	638	**51.6**	28.5	19.9	23.1
Pitagórica	23–27 Feb 2025	400	**49**	37	14	12
Intercampus	21–26 Jan 2025	638	**52.5**	29.3	18.2	23.2
ICS/ISCTE	9–20 Jan 2025	805	**43**	20	37	23
Pitagórica	28 Dec 2024–5 Jan 2025	400	**51**	30	19	21
Intercampus	21–27 Nov 2024	605	**49.3**	30.3	20.3	19.0
Aximage	6–19 Sep 2024	818	**47**	28	25	19
Intercampus	19–26 Jul 2024	609	**48.8**	40.2	11.0	8.6

Polling firm	Fieldwork date	Sample size	Gouveia e Melo	Seguro	Oth/ Und	Lead
Polling firm	Fieldwork date	Sample size	Ind.	PS	Oth/ Und	Lead
Pitagórica	13–15 Jan 2026	1,200	30	**56**	14	26
Pitagórica	12–14 Jan 2026	903	34	**55**	11	21
Pitagórica	11–13 Jan 2026	755	32	**55**	13	23
Intercampus	6–13 Jan 2026	806	**39.1**	38.0	23.0	1.1
Consulmark2	5–13 Jan 2026	993	33.6	**50.8**	15.6	17.2
Aximage	9–12 Jan 2026	606	25	**43**	32	18
Aximage	1–6 Jan 2026	800	**31**	**31**	38	Tie
Pitagórica	11–19 Dec 2025	1,000	34	**48**	18	14
Intercampus	12–16 Dec 2025	611	37.3	**38.5**	24.2	1.2
ICS/ISCTE	5–13 Dec 2025	903	**36**	26	38	10
CESOP–UCP	4–12 Dec 2025	1,185	44	**49**	7	5
Consulmark2	19–28 Nov 2025	795	36.0	**44.5**	19.5	8.5
Intercampus	14–19 Nov 2025	611	**37.2**	34.7	28.1	2.5
ICS/ISCTE	7–17 Nov 2025	807	**41**	24	35	17
Pitagórica	5–14 Nov 2025	1,000	39	**43**	18	4
Aximage	23–27 Oct 2025	651	**40**	35	25	5
Intercampus	20–26 Oct 2025	609	**42.0**	38.9	19.1	3.1
Pitagórica	6–10 Oct 2025	625	**44**	37	19	7
Intercampus	1–8 Oct 2025	802	**48.8**	32.2	19.1	16.6
Intercampus	7–14 Aug 2025	611	**42.2**	34.7	23.1	7.5
Aximage	11–21 Jul 2025	1,000	**42**	36	22	6
Intercampus	11–18 Jul 2025	606	**41.6**	38.1	20.3	3.5
Intercampus	5–15 Jun 2025	616	**44.5**	32.3	23.2	12.2
Intercampus	4–10 Mar 2025	638	**54.5**	24.5	21.0	30.0
Pitagórica	23–27 Feb 2025	400	**51**	32	17	19
Intercampus	21–26 Jan 2025	638	**55.2**	24.9	19.9	30.3
ICS/ISCTE	9–20 Jan 2025	805	**45**	16	39	29
Pitagórica	28 Dec 2024–5 Jan 2025	400	**54**	26	20	28

Polling firm	Fieldwork date	Sample size	Gouveia e Melo	Ventura	Oth/ Und	Lead
Polling firm	Fieldwork date	Sample size	Ind.	CH	Oth/ Und	Lead
Pitagórica	13–15 Jan 2026	1,200	60	26	14	34
Pitagórica	12–14 Jan 2026	903	62	25	13	37
Pitagórica	11–13 Jan 2026	755	63	24	13	39
Intercampus	6–13 Jan 2026	806	56.5	29.8	13.8	26.7
Consulmark2	5–13 Jan 2026	993	60.2	25.8	14.0	34.4
Aximage	9–12 Jan 2026	606	43	28	29	15
Aximage	1–6 Jan 2026	800	44	28	28	16
Pitagórica	11–19 Dec 2025	1,000	62	21	17	41
Intercampus	12–16 Dec 2025	611	52.5	30.0	17.5	22.5
ICS/ISCTE	5–13 Dec 2025	903	47	24	29	23
CESOP–UCP	4–12 Dec 2025	1,185	68	25	7	43
Consulmark2	19–28 Nov 2025	795	63.4	19.5	17.1	43.9
Intercampus	14–19 Nov 2025	611	54.0	25.7	20.3	28.3
ICS/ISCTE	7–17 Nov 2025	807	49	23	28	26
Pitagórica	5–14 Nov 2025	1,000	68	18	14	50
Aximage	23–27 Oct 2025	651	54	25	21	29
Intercampus	20–26 Oct 2025	609	61.2	29.4	9.4	31.8
Pitagórica	6–10 Oct 2025	625	63	15	22	48
Intercampus	1–8 Oct 2025	802	60.3	25.6	14.1	34.7
Intercampus	7–14 Aug 2025	611	56.6	25.9	17.5	30.7
Intercampus	11–18 Jul 2025	606	63.4	19.1	17.5	44.3
Pitagórica	23–27 Feb 2025	400	71	13	16	58
ICS/ISCTE	9–20 Jan 2025	805	53	16	31	29

Polling firm	Fieldwork date	Sample size	Gouveia e Melo	Cotrim	Oth/ Und	Lead
Polling firm	Fieldwork date	Sample size	Ind.	IL	Oth/ Und	Lead
Pitagórica	13–15 Jan 2026	1,200	36	50	14	16
Pitagórica	12–14 Jan 2026	903	38	53	9	15
Pitagórica	11–13 Jan 2026	755	39	51	10	12
Intercampus	6–13 Jan 2026	806	38.3	39.7	22.0	1.4
Consulmark2	5–13 Jan 2026	993	40.2	44.0	15.8	3.8
Pitagórica	11–19 Dec 2025	1,000	40	42	18	2

Polling firm	Fieldwork date	Sample size	Marques Mendes	Seguro	Oth/ Und	Lead
Polling firm	Fieldwork date	Sample size	PSD	PS	Oth/ Und	Lead
Pitagórica	13–15 Jan 2026	1,200	32	**55**	13	23
Pitagórica	12–14 Jan 2026	903	33	**56**	11	23
Pitagórica	11–13 Jan 2026	755	33	**55**	12	22
Intercampus	6–13 Jan 2026	806	**41.4**	33.1	25.5	8.3
Consulmark2	5–13 Jan 2026	993	34.6	**47.2**	18.1	12.6
Aximage	9–12 Jan 2026	606	26	**41**	33	15
Aximage	1–6 Jan 2026	800	28	**33**	39	5
Pitagórica	11–19 Dec 2025	1,000	**41**	**41**	18	Tie
Intercampus	12–16 Dec 2025	611	**41.4**	33.1	25.5	8.3
ICS/ISCTE	5–13 Dec 2025	903	**37**	25	38	12
CESOP–UCP	4–12 Dec 2025	1,185	**48**	43	9	5
Consulmark2	19–28 Nov 2025	795	**43.6**	35.7	20.7	7.9
Intercampus	14–19 Nov 2025	611	**39.9**	32.1	28.0	7.8
ICS/ISCTE	7–17 Nov 2025	807	**36**	26	38	10
Pitagórica	5–14 Nov 2025	1,000	**44**	40	16	4
Aximage	23–27 Oct 2025	651	**37**	**37**	26	Tie
Intercampus	20–26 Oct 2025	609	**43.2**	33.5	23.3	9.7
Pitagórica	6–10 Oct 2025	625	**40**	37	23	3
Intercampus	1–8 Oct 2025	802	**47.1**	30.7	22.2	16.4
Intercampus	7–14 Aug 2025	611	**41.9**	32.1	26.0	9.8
Aximage	11–21 Jul 2025	1,000	36	**37**	27	1
Intercampus	11–18 Jul 2025	606	38.0	**39.6**	22.4	1.6
Intercampus	5–15 Jun 2025	616	**41.2**	30.0	28.7	11.2
Intercampus	4–10 Mar 2025	638	**42.4**	29.0	28.6	13.4
Pitagórica	23–27 Feb 2025	400	**43**	32	25	11
Intercampus	21–26 Jan 2025	638	**44.5**	28.8	26.7	15.7
Pitagórica	28 Dec 2024–5 Jan 2025	400	**40**	34	26	6

Polling firm	Fieldwork date	Sample size	Marques Mendes	Ventura	Oth/ Und	Lead
Polling firm	Fieldwork date	Sample size	PSD	CH	Oth/ Und	Lead
Pitagórica	13–15 Jan 2026	1,200	60	28	12	32
Pitagórica	12–14 Jan 2026	903	60	27	13	33
Pitagórica	11–13 Jan 2026	755	58	27	15	31
Intercampus	6–13 Jan 2026	806	55.8	30.1	14.1	25.7
Consulmark2	5–13 Jan 2026	993	59.8	26.1	14.1	33.7
Aximage	9–12 Jan 2026	606	43	30	27	13
Aximage	1–6 Jan 2026	800	44	29	27	15
Pitagórica	11–19 Dec 2025	1,000	65	21	14	44
Intercampus	12–16 Dec 2025	611	55.8	30.1	14.1	25.7
ICS/ISCTE	5–13 Dec 2025	903	49	23	28	26
CESOP–UCP	4–12 Dec 2025	1,185	69	26	5	43
Consulmark2	19–28 Nov 2025	795	64.8	20.0	15.2	44.8
Intercampus	14–19 Nov 2025	611	54.7	27.7	17.6	27.0
ICS/ISCTE	7–17 Nov 2025	807	47	24	29	23
Pitagórica	5–14 Nov 2025	1,000	70	19	11	51
Aximage	23–27 Oct 2025	651	54	25	21	29
Intercampus	20–26 Oct 2025	609	60.8	29.6	9.6	31.2
Pitagórica	6–10 Oct 2025	625	62	19	19	43
Intercampus	1–8 Oct 2025	802	60.1	26.1	13.8	34.0
Intercampus	7–14 Aug 2025	611	57.1	26.5	16.4	30.6
Pitagórica	23–27 Feb 2025	400	65	17	18	48

Polling firm	Fieldwork date	Sample size	Marques Mendes	Cotrim	Oth/ Und	Lead
Polling firm	Fieldwork date	Sample size	PSD	IL	Oth/ Und	Lead
Pitagórica	13–15 Jan 2026	1,200	36	**51**	13	15
Pitagórica	12–14 Jan 2026	903	34	**54**	12	20
Pitagórica	11–13 Jan 2026	755	34	**52**	14	18
Intercampus	6–13 Jan 2026	806	39.5	**40.2**	20.3	0.7
Consulmark2	5–13 Jan 2026	993	41.0	**42.4**	16.6	1.4
Pitagórica	11–19 Dec 2025	1,000	**48**	33	19	15

Polling firm	Fieldwork date	Sample size	Seguro	Cotrim	Oth/ Und	Lead
Polling firm	Fieldwork date	Sample size	PS	IL	Oth/ Und	Lead
Pitagórica	13–15 Jan 2026	1,200	47	44	9	3
Pitagórica	12–14 Jan 2026	903	46	**46**	8	Tie
Pitagórica	11–13 Jan 2026	755	46	44	10	2
Intercampus	6–13 Jan 2026	806	42.4	38.2	19.4	4.2
Consulmark2	5–13 Jan 2026	993	48.5	39.1	12.6	9.4
Pitagórica	11–19 Dec 2025	1,000	45	39	16	6

Polling firm	Fieldwork date	Sample size	Ventura	Cotrim	Oth/ Und	Lead
Polling firm	Fieldwork date	Sample size	CH	IL	Oth/ Und	Lead
Pitagórica	13–15 Jan 2026	1,200	21	64	15	43
Pitagórica	12–14 Jan 2026	903	21	67	12	46
Pitagórica	11–13 Jan 2026	755	21	67	12	46
Intercampus	6–13 Jan 2026	806	29.0	58.2	12.8	29.2
Consulmark2	5–13 Jan 2026	993	22.4	62.5	15.1	40.1
Pitagórica	11–19 Dec 2025	1,000	19	62	19	43

Hypothetical polling

Polling firm	Fieldwork date	Sample size	António José Seguro	António Vitorino	Santos Silva	António Guterres	Ana Gomes	Mário Centeno	Gouveia e Melo	Marques Mendes	Passos Coelho	Leonor Beleza	Paulo Portas	Santana Lopes	Durão Barroso	André Ventura	O/U	Lead
Polling firm	Fieldwork date	Sample size	PS	PS	PS	PS	PS	PS	Ind.	PSD	PSD	PSD	CDS	Ind.	PSD	CH	O/U	Lead
Intercampus	4–10 Mar 2025	638	—N/a	21.6	—N/a	—N/a	—N/a	—N/a	**57.1**	—N/a	—N/a	—N/a	—N/a	—N/a	—N/a	—N/a	29.3	18.1
Intercampus	4–10 Mar 2025	638	—N/a	26.3	—N/a	—N/a	—N/a	—N/a	—N/a	**44.4**	—N/a	—N/a	—N/a	—N/a	—N/a	—N/a	21.3	35.5
Pitagórica	23–27 Feb 2025	400	—N/a	30	—N/a	—N/a	—N/a	—N/a	**53**	—N/a	—N/a	—N/a	—N/a	—N/a	—N/a	—N/a	17	23
Pitagórica	23–27 Feb 2025	400	—N/a	31	—N/a	—N/a	—N/a	—N/a	—N/a	**45**	—N/a	—N/a	—N/a	—N/a	—N/a	—N/a	24	14
Pitagórica	23–27 Feb 2025	400	—N/a	**62**	—N/a	—N/a	—N/a	—N/a	—N/a	—N/a	—N/a	—N/a	—N/a	—N/a	—N/a	20	18	42
Intercampus	21–26 Jan 2025	638	—N/a	25.2	—N/a	—N/a	—N/a	—N/a	**56.0**	—N/a	—N/a	—N/a	—N/a	—N/a	—N/a	—N/a	18.8	30.8
Intercampus	21–26 Jan 2025	638	—N/a	28.8	—N/a	—N/a	—N/a	—N/a	—N/a	**45.0**	—N/a	—N/a	—N/a	—N/a	—N/a	—N/a	26.2	16.2
ICS/ISCTE	9–20 Jan 2025	805	—N/a	16	—N/a	—N/a	—N/a	—N/a	**53**	—N/a	—N/a	—N/a	—N/a	—N/a	—N/a	—N/a	31	37
ICS/ISCTE	9–20 Jan 2025	805	—N/a	—N/a	—N/a	—N/a	—N/a	23	**40**	—N/a	—N/a	—N/a	—N/a	—N/a	—N/a	—N/a	37	17
Pitagórica	28 Dec 2024–5 Jan 2025	400	36	—N/a	—N/a	—N/a	—N/a	—N/a	—N/a	—N/a	**46**	—N/a	—N/a	—N/a	—N/a	—N/a	18	10
Pitagórica	28 Dec 2024–5 Jan 2025	400	—N/a	27	—N/a	—N/a	—N/a	—N/a	**55**	—N/a	—N/a	—N/a	—N/a	—N/a	—N/a	—N/a	18	28
Pitagórica	28 Dec 2024–5 Jan 2025	400	—N/a	32	—N/a	—N/a	—N/a	—N/a	—N/a	**43**	—N/a	—N/a	—N/a	—N/a	—N/a	—N/a	25	11
Pitagórica	28 Dec 2024–5 Jan 2025	400	—N/a	34	—N/a	—N/a	—N/a	—N/a	—N/a	—N/a	**49**	—N/a	—N/a	—N/a	—N/a	—N/a	17	15
Pitagórica	28 Dec 2024–5 Jan 2025	400	—N/a	—N/a	—N/a	—N/a	—N/a	32	**51**	—N/a	—N/a	—N/a	—N/a	—N/a	—N/a	—N/a	17	19
Pitagórica	28 Dec 2024–5 Jan 2025	400	—N/a	—N/a	—N/a	—N/a	—N/a	**42**	—N/a	36	—N/a	—N/a	—N/a	—N/a	—N/a	—N/a	22	6
Pitagórica	28 Dec 2024–5 Jan 2025	400	—N/a	—N/a	—N/a	—N/a	—N/a	42	—N/a	—N/a	**44**	—N/a	—N/a	—N/a	—N/a	—N/a	14	2
Pitagórica	28 Dec 2024–5 Jan 2025	400	—N/a	—N/a	—N/a	—N/a	—N/a	—N/a	**50**	—N/a	32	—N/a	—N/a	—N/a	—N/a	—N/a	18	18
Intercampus	21–27 Nov 2024	605	—N/a	—N/a	—N/a	—N/a	32.0	—N/a	—N/a	**44.6**	—N/a	—N/a	—N/a	—N/a	—N/a	—N/a	23.4	12.6
Intercampus	21–27 Nov 2024	605	—N/a	—N/a	—N/a	—N/a	37.3	—N/a	—N/a	—N/a	**46.5**	—N/a	—N/a	—N/a	—N/a	—N/a	16.2	9.2
Intercampus	21–27 Nov 2024	605	—N/a	—N/a	—N/a	—N/a	**42.2**	—N/a	—N/a	—N/a	—N/a	—N/a	—N/a	31.8	—N/a	—N/a	26.0	10.4
Intercampus	21–27 Nov 2024	605	—N/a	—N/a	—N/a	—N/a	35.8	—N/a	—N/a	—N/a	—N/a	—N/a	—N/a	—N/a	**40.7**	—N/a	23.5	4.9
Intercampus	21–27 Nov 2024	605	—N/a	—N/a	—N/a	—N/a	—N/a	**39.0**	—N/a	35.6	—N/a	—N/a	—N/a	—N/a	—N/a	—N/a	25.4	3.4
Intercampus	21–27 Nov 2024	605	—N/a	—N/a	—N/a	—N/a	—N/a	**39.9**	—N/a	—N/a	39.5	—N/a	—N/a	—N/a	—N/a	—N/a	20.5	0.4
Intercampus	21–27 Nov 2024	605	—N/a	—N/a	—N/a	—N/a	—N/a	**52.5**	—N/a	—N/a	—N/a	—N/a	—N/a	21.3	—N/a	—N/a	26.2	31.2
Intercampus	21–27 Nov 2024	605	—N/a	—N/a	—N/a	—N/a	—N/a	**45.0**	—N/a	—N/a	—N/a	—N/a	—N/a	—N/a	29.4	—N/a	25.6	15.6
Intercampus	21–27 Nov 2024	605	—N/a	—N/a	—N/a	—N/a	—N/a	—N/a	**50.8**	—N/a	31.8	—N/a	—N/a	—N/a	—N/a	—N/a	17.3	19.0
Intercampus	21–27 Nov 2024	605	—N/a	—N/a	—N/a	—N/a	—N/a	—N/a	**59.1**	—N/a	—N/a	—N/a	—N/a	19.8	—N/a	—N/a	21.1	39.3
Intercampus	21–27 Nov 2024	605	—N/a	—N/a	—N/a	—N/a	—N/a	—N/a	**52.4**	—N/a	—N/a	—N/a	—N/a	—N/a	28.6	—N/a	19.0	23.8
Aximage	6–19 Sep 2024	818	—N/a	—N/a	—N/a	—N/a	—N/a	**34**	—N/a	33	—N/a	—N/a	—N/a	—N/a	—N/a	—N/a	33	1
Aximage	6–19 Sep 2024	818	—N/a	—N/a	—N/a	—N/a	—N/a	**56**	—N/a	—N/a	—N/a	—N/a	—N/a	—N/a	—N/a	22	22	34
Aximage	6–19 Sep 2024	818	—N/a	—N/a	—N/a	—N/a	—N/a	**43**	—N/a	—N/a	35	—N/a	—N/a	—N/a	—N/a	—N/a	22	8
Aximage	6–19 Sep 2024	818	—N/a	—N/a	—N/a	—N/a	—N/a	—N/a	**51**	—N/a	28	—N/a	—N/a	—N/a	—N/a	—N/a	21	23
Aximage	6–19 Sep 2024	818	—N/a	—N/a	—N/a	—N/a	—N/a	29	**38**	—N/a	—N/a	—N/a	—N/a	—N/a	—N/a	—N/a	33	9
Aximage	6–19 Sep 2024	818	—N/a	—N/a	19	—N/a	—N/a	—N/a	**48**	—N/a	—N/a	—N/a	—N/a	—N/a	—N/a	—N/a	33	29
Aximage	6–19 Sep 2024	818	—N/a	—N/a	—N/a	—N/a	21	—N/a	**54**	—N/a	—N/a	—N/a	—N/a	—N/a	—N/a	—N/a	25	33
Intercampus	19–26 Jul 2024	609	—N/a	—N/a	—N/a	**56.7**	—N/a	—N/a	33.2	—N/a	—N/a	—N/a	—N/a	—N/a	—N/a	—N/a	10.1	23.5
Intercampus	19–26 Jul 2024	609	—N/a	—N/a	—N/a	**55.6**	—N/a	—N/a	—N/a	34.9	—N/a	—N/a	—N/a	—N/a	—N/a	—N/a	9.5	20.7
Intercampus	19–26 Jul 2024	609	—N/a	—N/a	—N/a	**58.0**	—N/a	—N/a	—N/a	—N/a	34.7	—N/a	—N/a	—N/a	—N/a	—N/a	7.3	23.3
Intercampus	19–26 Jul 2024	609	—N/a	—N/a	—N/a	**66.1**	—N/a	—N/a	—N/a	—N/a	—N/a	21.7	—N/a	—N/a	—N/a	—N/a	12.2	44.4
Intercampus	19–26 Jul 2024	609	—N/a	—N/a	—N/a	**66.8**	—N/a	—N/a	—N/a	—N/a	—N/a	—N/a	22.6	—N/a	—N/a	—N/a	10.6	44.2
Intercampus	19–26 Jul 2024	609	—N/a	—N/a	—N/a	**69.2**	—N/a	—N/a	—N/a	—N/a	—N/a	—N/a	—N/a	19.4	—N/a	—N/a	11.4	49.8
Intercampus	19–26 Jul 2024	609	—N/a	—N/a	—N/a	—N/a	36.7	—N/a	**52.7**	—N/a	—N/a	—N/a	—N/a	—N/a	—N/a	—N/a	10.7	16.0
Intercampus	19–26 Jul 2024	609	—N/a	—N/a	—N/a	—N/a	33.4	—N/a	—N/a	**55.0**	—N/a	—N/a	—N/a	—N/a	—N/a	—N/a	11.6	21.6
Intercampus	19–26 Jul 2024	609	—N/a	—N/a	—N/a	—N/a	42.4	—N/a	—N/a	—N/a	**48.8**	—N/a	—N/a	—N/a	—N/a	—N/a	8.8	6.4
Intercampus	19–26 Jul 2024	609	—N/a	—N/a	—N/a	—N/a	**48.3**	—N/a	—N/a	—N/a	—N/a	37.8	—N/a	—N/a	—N/a	—N/a	13.9	10.5
Intercampus	19–26 Jul 2024	609	—N/a	—N/a	—N/a	—N/a	**49.9**	—N/a	—N/a	—N/a	—N/a	—N/a	36.9	—N/a	—N/a	—N/a	13.2	13.0
Intercampus	19–26 Jul 2024	609	—N/a	—N/a	—N/a	—N/a	**52.5**	—N/a	—N/a	—N/a	—N/a	—N/a	—N/a	33.2	—N/a	—N/a	14.3	19.3
Intercampus	19–26 Jul 2024	609	—N/a	—N/a	—N/a	—N/a	—N/a	40.2	**46.8**	—N/a	—N/a	—N/a	—N/a	—N/a	—N/a	—N/a	13.0	6.6
Intercampus	19–26 Jul 2024	609	—N/a	—N/a	—N/a	—N/a	—N/a	37.1	—N/a	**48.4**	—N/a	—N/a	—N/a	—N/a	—N/a	—N/a	14.5	11.3
Intercampus	19–26 Jul 2024	609	—N/a	—N/a	—N/a	—N/a	—N/a	**48.4**	—N/a	—N/a	41.1	—N/a	—N/a	—N/a	—N/a	—N/a	10.5	7.3
Intercampus	19–26 Jul 2024	609	—N/a	—N/a	—N/a	—N/a	—N/a	**56.5**	—N/a	—N/a	—N/a	27.0	—N/a	—N/a	—N/a	—N/a	16.5	29.5
Intercampus	19–26 Jul 2024	609	—N/a	—N/a	—N/a	—N/a	—N/a	**56.0**	—N/a	—N/a	—N/a	—N/a	29.4	—N/a	—N/a	—N/a	14.6	26.6
Intercampus	19–26 Jul 2024	609	—N/a	—N/a	—N/a	—N/a	—N/a	**57.8**	—N/a	—N/a	—N/a	—N/a	—N/a	25.9	—N/a	—N/a	16.3	31.9
Intercampus	19–26 Jul 2024	609	—N/a	—N/a	—N/a	—N/a	—N/a	—N/a	**51.9**	—N/a	37.6	—N/a	—N/a	—N/a	—N/a	—N/a	10.5	14.3
Intercampus	19–26 Jul 2024	609	—N/a	—N/a	—N/a	—N/a	—N/a	—N/a	**63.7**	—N/a	—N/a	23.9	—N/a	—N/a	—N/a	—N/a	12.4	39.8
Intercampus	19–26 Jul 2024	609	—N/a	—N/a	—N/a	—N/a	—N/a	—N/a	**61.1**	—N/a	—N/a	—N/a	27.3	—N/a	—N/a	—N/a	11.6	33.8
Intercampus	19–26 Jul 2024	609	—N/a	—N/a	—N/a	—N/a	—N/a	—N/a	**68.1**	—N/a	—N/a	—N/a	—N/a	19.8	—N/a	—N/a	12.1	48.3

== Leadership polls ==
=== Preferred candidate ===
Poll results showing public opinion on who would be the best candidate for each political side, are shown in the table below in reverse chronological order, showing the most recent first.

==== Right-wing ====
Polling firm	Fieldwork date	Sample size	Marques Mendes	Passos Coelho	Rui Rio	André Ventura	Paulo Portas	Santana Lopes	Cotrim Figueiredo	O/U	Lead
Polling firm	Fieldwork date	Sample size	PSD	PSD	PSD	CH	CDS	Ind.	IL	O/U	Lead
Consulmark2	14–22 Apr 2025	569 (Note: Which candidate should the Social Democratic Party (PSD) support?)	**54.1**	—N/a	—N/a	—N/a	28.8	—N/a	—N/a	17.0	25.3
Aximage	6–19 Sep 2024	818	**39**	37	—N/a	—N/a	—N/a	—N/a	—N/a	22	2
Aximage	14–18 Sep 2023	804	**19.8**	19.5	13.0	11.3	11.2	7.0	6.0	12.2	0.3

==== Left-wing ====
Polling firm	Fieldwork date	Sample size	António Guterres	António José Seguro	António Vitorino	Ana Gomes	Mário Centeno	Elisa Ferreira	Santos Silva	Francisco Assis	Francisco Louçã	João Ferreira	O/U	Lead
Polling firm	Fieldwork date	Sample size	PS	PS	PS	PS	PS	PS	PS	PS	BE	CDU	O/U	Lead
Intercampus	5–15 Jun 2025	616 (Note: Which candidate should the Socialist Party (PS) support?)	—N/a	**25.8**	15.3	12.5	—N/a	—N/a	8.1	—N/a	—N/a	—N/a	38.3	10.5
Consulmark2	14–22 Apr 2025	569	—N/a	**41.7**	29.5	—N/a	—N/a	—N/a	—N/a	—N/a	—N/a	—N/a	28.8	12.2
Pitagórica	23–27 Feb 2025	400	—N/a	**56**	44	—N/a	—N/a	—N/a	—N/a	—N/a	—N/a	—N/a	—N/a	12
Intercampus	21–26 Jan 2025	638	—N/a	**24.9**	21.3	14.4	—N/a	7.1	—N/a	—N/a	—N/a	—N/a	32.3	3.6
Aximage	6–19 Sep 2024	818	—N/a	—N/a	—N/a	14	**41**	—N/a	18	—N/a	—N/a	—N/a	27	23
Aximage	14–18 Sep 2023	804	**34**	—N/a	—N/a	19	12	—N/a	8	6	9	5	7	15
