= The Great Game of Politics =

2004 political science book by Dick Stoken

The Great Game of Politics: Why We Elect, Whom We Elect
- Author: Dick Stoken
- Language: English
- Published: 2004 (Macmillan Publishers)
- Publication place: United States
- ISBN: 9780765307323

The Great Game of Politics: Why We Elect, Whom We Elect is a 2004 political science book by Dick Stoken that discusses the history and details of the Presidency of the United States from George Washington to George W. Bush.

== Reception ==
Reception of The Great Game of Politics was generally critical.

Kirkus Reviews stated that The Great Game of Politics was an "Amateurish exercise in political history, turning on half-correct assumptions and half-formed arguments."

Publishers Weekly states "Serious students of the American presidency will find Stoken's thinking a bit simplistic as well as present-minded. And Stoken, an investor who has written several investment books . . . , writes more like a motivational speaker — he's prone to exclamation points — than a historian. But less-schooled readers may find some help in thinking about the approaching 2004 election."
