= Survival of the Fittest for Investors =

Survival of the Fittest for Investors: Using Darwin’s Laws of Evolution to Build a Winning Portfolio
- First edition
- Author: Dick Stoken
- Language: English
- Published: 2011 (McGraw Hill Professional)
- Publication place: United States
- ISBN: 9780071782296

Survival of the Fittest for Investors is a 2011 finance book by Dick Stoken about how the theories of Darwinism and survival of the fittest can be applied to an investor's portfolio. The full title of the book is Survival of the Fittest for Investors: Using Darwin's Laws of Evolution to Build a Winning Portfolio.

== Reception ==
Reception of Survival of the Fittest for Investors was generally positive.

The book was named as one of the "Year's Top Investment Books" and contender for "Best Investment Book of the Year" by the 2013 Stock Traders Almanac. It stated that Survival of the Fittest for Investors "Shows how, with heightened insight and a powerful algorithm, you can survive and thrive in volatile markets by following the simple principles of evolution."

Leo Melamed, chairman of CME Group, stated that “Dick Stoken’s Survival of the Fittest for Investors is a masterful and unique dissection of what makes the market tick. It represents an indispensable and brand-new approach for the serious investor. A must on every investor’s reading list.”

Seeking Alpha stated that "Survival of the Fittest for Investors is one of the “fittest,” best written investment books . . . The investor who is searching for a way to boost returns would do well to add it to his must-read list."
