= Andrew Alper =

American businessman

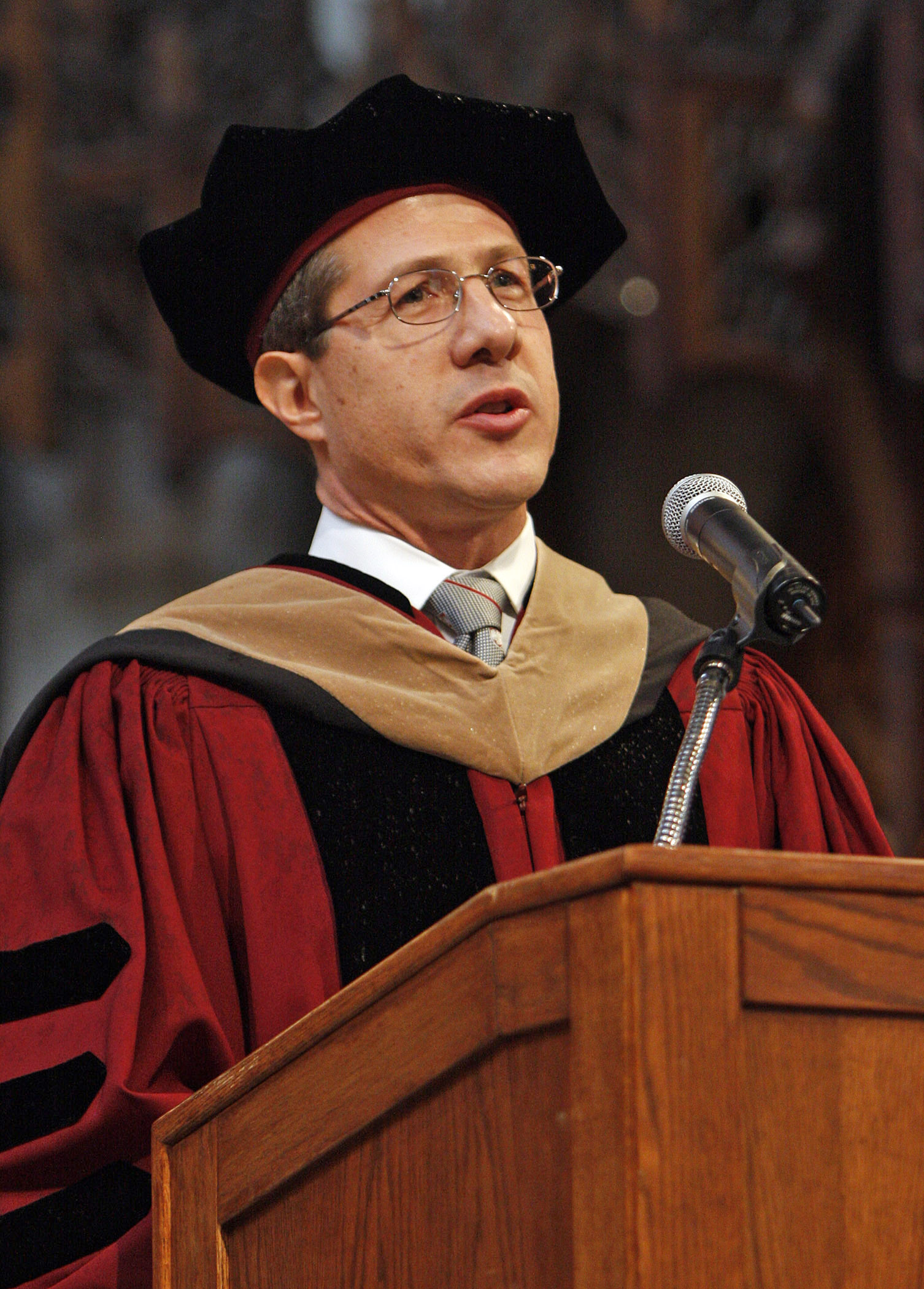
Alper in at the October 2009 University of Chicago convocation

Andrew Alper was the President of the New York City Economic Development Corporation (NYCEDC).

== President of the New York City Economic Development Corporation ==
Alper was appointed as President on January 15, 2002 by New York City Mayor Michael Bloomberg. In his time as President, Mr. Alper worked with the Mayor's Office to encourage industrial expansion, business development, and employment opportunities in New York City. He was also actively involved in the planning for the redevelopment of the site of the former World Trade Center.

== Goldman, Sachs & Company ==
Before joining the NYCEDC, Mr. Alper was employed by Goldman Sachs since 1981. Mr. Alper started work there as a corporate finance generalist before becoming the youngest partner in firm history at the time in 1990. He also served as the Vice President and then the Managing Director of Goldman, Sachs & Co.'s finance department. In 1997 he became the Chief Operation Officer of the company's global investment banking business.

== Involvement with the University of Chicago ==
Alper has also been actively involved with his alma mater: the University of Chicago. He received his A.B. from The College of the University of Chicago in 1980, concentrating in economics, and his M.B.A. from the University of Chicago Booth School of Business (Chicago Booth) in 1981. As an undergraduate in the College, Alper resided in Pierce Hall and enjoyed working on a free weekly South Side newspaper he created: The Chicago Journal. He also met his wife at that University during orientation week with whom he has two children, Karen and Jennifer Alper.

Since graduating, he has been an active alumnus, receiving a Young Alumni Service Citation in 1993. He was appointed to the Alumni Association Board of Governors in 1994 and served as the board's Vice President from 1996 to 1998. Since that time, he has served on the Chicago Booth Council and is currently the co-chair of Chicago Booth's Capital Campaign.

Currently, Alper is a member of the University of Chicago Board of Trustees and the Chairman of the completed Chicago Initiative, a University fundraising drive to raise $2 billion for Chicago's endowment.

He is also the namesake of Alper House in the University of Chicago House System. Alper House is located on the third and fourth floors of the Max Palevsky East Residential Commons.
