= Harold L. Sirkin =

American business consultant and author (born 1959)

Harold "Hal" L. Sirkin (November 22, 1959 – January 19, 2022) was an American business consultant and author, who often wrote about trends in innovation and global business competition. He graduated summa cum laude from the Wharton School of the University of Pennsylvania in 1980 with a B.S. in Economics, and from the University of Chicago in 1981 with an M.B.A. He was also a professor at Kellogg School of Management and a CPA.

== Career ==
He was the co-author of two books: Payback: Reaping the Rewards of Innovation, which advises companies to adopt a systematic approach to innovation, and Globality: Competing with Everyone from Everywhere for Everything, which explores strategies for economic competition under globality, the end state of globalization. Payback was named one of the "Best Innovation and Design Books for 2006" by BusinessWeek magazine. Globality was picked by The Economist as one of the best business books of 2008. Sirkin has also contributed to Time and the Harvard Business Review.

== Selected bibliography ==
=== Books ===
- Sirkin, Harold L.; Hemerling, James W.; Bhattacharya, Arindam K; with John Butman (2008). Globality: Competing with Everyone from Everywhere for Everything. New York: Business Plus: ISBN 0-446-17829-2
- Sirkin, Harold L.; Andrew, James P.; Butman, John (2007). Payback: Reaping the Rewards of Innovation. Cambridge, MA: Harvard Business School Press: ISBN 1-4221-0313-7 ISBN 978-1-4221-0313-5
- Sirkin, Harold L.; Rose, Justin R.; Zinser, Michael (2012). The US Manufacturing Renaissance: How Shifting Global Economics Are Creating an American Comeback . Philadelphia, PA: Knowledge at Wharton: ISBN 9781625399380

== See also ==
- Boston Consulting Group
- Globality
