= TCV (investment firm) =

American investment firm

TCMI, Inc.
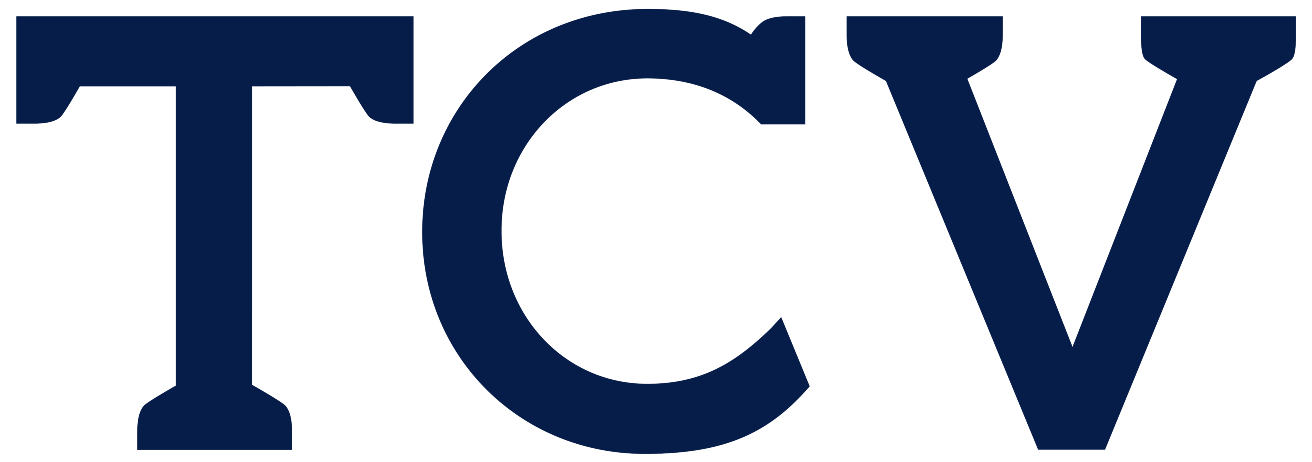
- Trade name: TCV
- Type: Private
- Industry: Investment management
- Founded: 1995; 31 years ago
- Founder: Richard H. Kimball; Jay Hoag
- Headquarters: Menlo Park, California, U.S.
- Products: Private Equity; Venture Capital
- AUM: US$25 billion (2022)
- Website: www.tcv.com

TCMI, Inc. better known by the name TCV (Technology Crossover Ventures) is an American investment firm based in Menlo Park, California. The firm mainly invests in public and private growth-stage companies in the technology industry.

== Background ==
TCV was founded in 1995 by Richard H. Kimball and Jay Hoag.

In 2021, the firm founded TCV Acquisition, a Special-purpose acquisition company (SPAC) with no commercial operations. It was formed to raise capital to acquire private companies. On April 14, it was listed on the Nasdaq under the ticker 'TCVA' and raised $350 million. In April 2023, the SPAC was liquidated as no deal could be found within the given timeframe.

The typical size of an investment that TCV makes in companies ranges from $3 million to $300 million. As of 2020, TCV has invested over $13 billion in over 350 companies. Notable private investments include Airbnb, ByteDance, Facebook, GoFundMe and Spotify. The firm also makes public investments in companies it previously backed when they were private such as Netflix, Zillow and LinkedIn.

== Funds ==
| Fund | Vintage Year | Committed Capital ($m) |
|---|---|---|
| Technology Crossover Ventures I | 1995 | USD 100 |
| Technology Crossover Ventures II | 1996 | USD 195 |
| Technology Crossover Ventures III | 1999 | USD 417 |
| Technology Crossover Ventures IV | 2000 | USD 1,700 |
| Technology Crossover Ventures V | 2004 | USD 900 |
| Technology Crossover Ventures VI | 2006 | USD 1,400 |
| Technology Crossover Ventures VII | 2008 | USD 3,000 |
| Technology Crossover Ventures VIII | 2013 | USD 2,230 |
| Technology Crossover Ventures IX | 2016 | USD 2,500 |
| Technology Crossover Ventures Sports | 2018 | USD 55 |
| Technology Crossover Ventures X | 2019 | USD 3,000 |
| Technology Crossover Ventures XI | 2020 | USD 4,000 |
| Technology Crossover Ventures XII | 2024 | USD 3,000 |
