= Karen Sheriff =

American-born, Canadian business executive

Karen Sheriff (born February 8, 1958) is an American-born, Canadian business executive. Since January 2015, she has served as president and CEO of Q9 Networks, Inc. She previously served as president and CEO of Bell Aliant. She has received numerous honours, including being named one of the Top 50 CEOs in 2012 and 2014 by Atlantic Business Magazine.

== Early life and education ==
Sheriff was born Karen Handler in Chicago, Illinois. Her father, Milton E. Handler, was a manufacturer who held several patents; her mother was a housewife who later ran her own store.

She earned a bachelor's degree in psychology, economics, and mathematics at Washington University in St. Louis in 1979, as well as her MBA in marketing and finance at the University of Chicago in 1984.

== Career ==
After graduation, Sheriff joined United Airlines, where she filled eight marketing positions over a period of 10 years.

She then joined Ameritech, working in corporate marketing and branding. After the latter's 20% acquisition of Bell Canada, in 1998 she moved from Chicago to Toronto to take on the role of head of product development for Bell.

In 1999, she was named senior vice president of product management and development for Bell Canada. In January 2000, she advanced to chief marketing officer, and in June 2003, moved into the role of president of small and medium business. She was promoted to COO of Bell Aliant Regional Communications LP in July 2008. From November 2008 to January 2011, she served as president and CEO of Bell Aliant Regional Communications LP. From January 2011 to December 2014 she was CEO of Bell Aliant Inc.

In 2013, Sheriff's pension package at Bell Aliant was reportedly in excess of $5.5 million. Her executive compensation package totalled over $3.6 million, including her salary of $750,000.

In September 2014, she announced her intention to retire from Bell Aliant, effective December 31. In November 2014, she was named the new president and CEO of Q9 Networks, a Toronto-based data services provider, beginning on January 5, 2015.

== Other activities ==
Sheriff is chair of the board of trustees for the Gardiner Museum in Toronto. In 2012, she was appointed to the Canada Pension Plan Investment Board by the Canadian government.

== Honors ==
Sheriff was named one of the Top 50 CEOs by Atlantic Business Magazine in 2012 and 2014. In 2013 and 2014 she was named one of the Top 25 Women of Influence by the Women of Influence organization. In 2012 she was honored as Woman of the Year by the Canadian Women in Communications.

The Women's Executive Network included Sheriff on their list of Canada's Top 100 Most Powerful Women on three occasions, and inducted her into its Top 100 Women Hall of Fame in 2007.

== Personal ==
Sheriff and her husband have two children. They reside in Toronto, Ontario. She has dual U.S.-Canadian citizenship.
