= Suburban Express =

American Midwest bus service

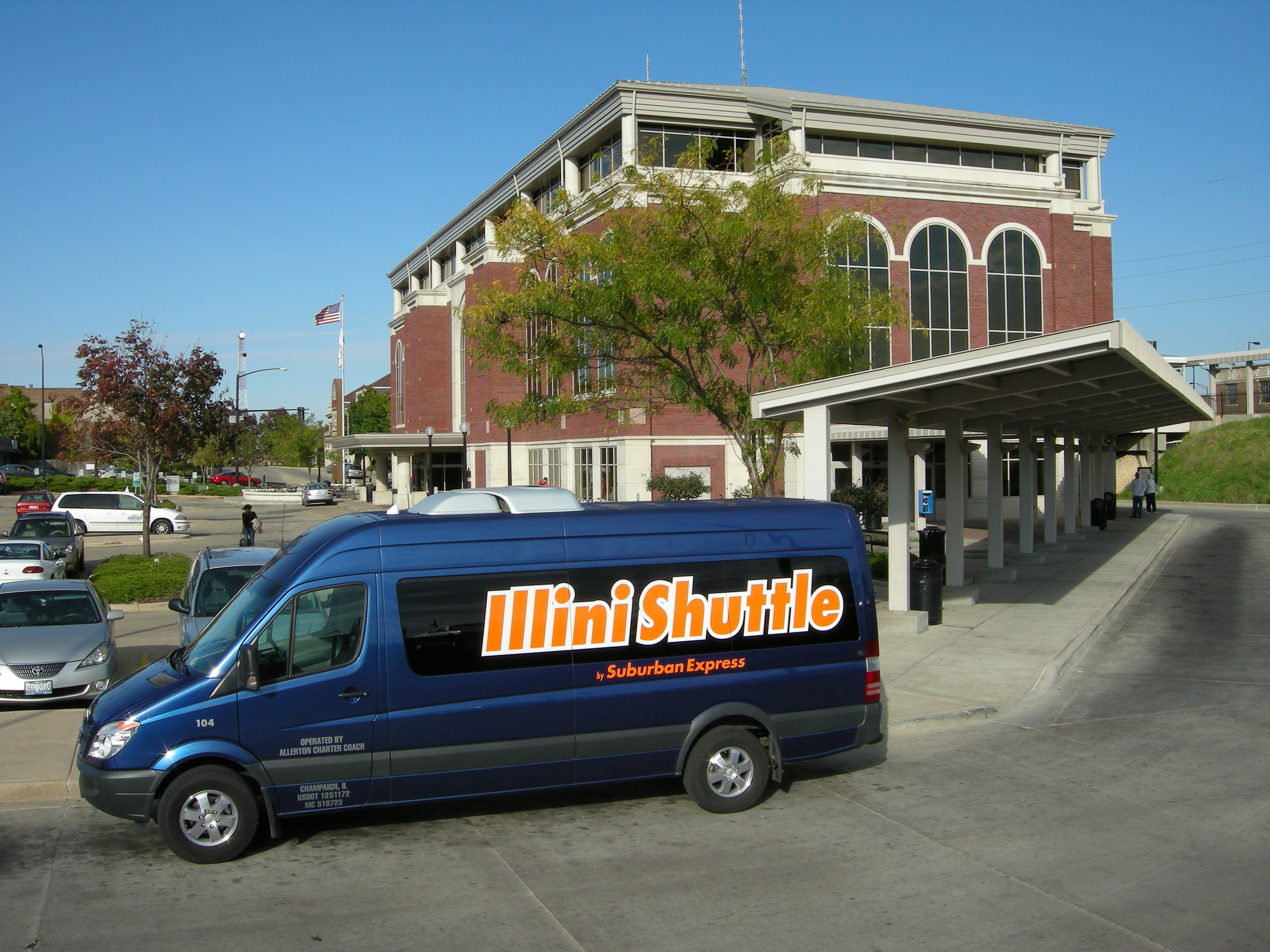
- Illini Shuttle, operated by Suburban Express, at Illinois Terminal in Champaign, Illinois.
- Founded: 1983
- Ceased operation: May 7, 2019
- Service area: Illinois, Indiana, Iowa
- Service type: Intercity coach service
- Destinations: Six universities served and Chicago suburbs
- Chief executive: Dennis Toeppen, President
- Website: www.suburbanexpress.com

Suburban Express was a bus service that provided transport services to students between Chicago Suburbs and six universities in Illinois, Iowa, and Indiana. Airport shuttles were operated under the name "Illini Shuttle". The company owned no vehicles, instead contracting buses from other carriers.

In the 1980s, Suburban Express broke the bus monopoly that Greyhound had between Champaign and Chicago, leading to a price war that cut student fares by more than half.

Since 1994, it filed at least 200 lawsuits over dishonored payments, fraud, and alleged violations of its terms of service, leading students to criticize the bus service online.

On May 7, 2019, Suburban Express announced that it would be ceasing all operations. "I stopped enjoying this business around 2001, and I think it’s beginning to show," said the owner.

== History ==
Suburban Express began operating in late 1983. At that time, scheduled bus service between Champaign and the Chicago area in Illinois was a monopoly operated by Greyhound Lines, and reinforced by exclusive ticket sales through the Illini Union Travel Center of the University of Illinois at Urbana–Champaign (UIUC). Between November and December 1983, Greyhound Lines suffered a nationwide strike by its drivers. For the Thanksgiving break during the Greyhound strike, Dennis Toeppen, then a 19-year-old student at UIUC, and later Suburban Express' founder, chartered six buses, sold tickets through a local travel agent, spent $600 on advertising, and undercut Greyhound's fares by $4 to $8. The Thanksgiving 1983 service carried nearly 300 students.

In January 1984, and then named Western Trails Transportation, the company announced regular weekly and holiday service. UIUC's Illini Union Travel Center, saying it relied on commissions from Greyhound and feared losing revenues, initially refused to sell competing tickets, despite their lower price. The Illini Union Travel Center also briefly offered its own competing charter service.

Suburban Express attracted the scrutiny of the Illinois Commerce Commission. The Commission asserted that Suburban Express was operating as a public utility without proper operating authority. Suburban Express responded that it was serving a pre-formed group of passengers rather than the general public, and that it was therefore not subject to the jurisdiction of the commission. After changing procedures to require that passengers display a university ID at boarding, the Commission found that Suburban Express was operating lawfully.

In 1984, a fare war between the company and Greyhound cut prices between Champaign and Chicago by more than fifty percent. Reacting to new competition, Greyhound lowered its prices from around $36 to $14.75 and filed two complaints with the Illinois Commerce Commission. In February 1985, the company, by then called Suburban Express, charged Greyhound with predatory pricing, claiming the $14.75 price was below Greyhound's costs and designed to drive competitors out of business. According to Suburban Express' lawyer, after the Department of Justice sent a letter to Greyhound, the bus service raised their rate by $3.

Suburban Express expanded its service to Eastern Illinois University in 1985, and to Illinois State University in 1989. In 2002, the company introduced self-service ticket kiosks in the Champaign area. The company's Illini Shuttle began service connecting UIUC to Chicago's Midway and O'Hare airports in October 2004. Service to the University of Iowa began during the 2006–2007 academic year.

The company closed its office on the University of Illinois campus during 2018. The company's website stated that the campus office was closed due to nearby demolition and construction and listed current telephone hours.

Suburban Express stopped operating on May 7, 2019. Said the owner, "I stopped enjoying this business around 2001, and I think it’s beginning to show."

== Transportation services ==
As of September 2015, Suburban Express offered weekly service to Chicago-area locations from four universities: University of Illinois at Urbana-Champaign, Illinois State University, Purdue University, and the University of Iowa. The company's Illini Shuttle ran daily from Champaign to O'Hare International Airport and the suburbs. According to the company, it hired only non-smoking drivers, had free Wi-Fi on most buses, and in the year prior to April 2013, carried around 100,000 passengers on up to 75 buses a day.

== Business practices, lawsuits, and controversies ==
Suburban Express' business, legal, and media practices have been the topic of numerous media discussions since early 2013. At that time, the company's terms of service said passengers would be charged a $100 convenience fee for using an "invalid, altered or duplicate ticket" and $500 for "disruptive behavior". In April 2013, the company sought $500 payment from a passenger whom they alleged engaged in disruptive behavior on a bus, leading to an active social media discussion. The passenger was upset by the driver's words and actions, and an account of the situation was widely seen on Facebook and in a college newspaper.

The case led to discussion online, a threat by the company to sue the subreddit's moderator over false and libelous comments, a Freedom of Information Act request by the company to UIUC, and a page on the company's website directed at the complaining passenger.

Suburban Express also maintains a "page of shame" where the company posted the name, email, phone number, and address of customers, many of them University of Illinois students, whom the company claims have "dishonored payments" or are "fare cheaters".

Suburban Express initiated 209 lawsuits between April 1994 and April 2013, of which most were small claims cases alleging terms of service violations by customers, while four were against competitors. A group of 126 lawsuits were filed in Ford County, Illinois in early 2013. Students complained that the company's choice of Ford County (30 miles from UIUC), made them ineligible for free legal aid from UIUC.

In explaining its small claims actions, Suburban Express stated that some students broke the company's rules by "printing out multiple copies of the tickets and allowing others to use them," or "using tickets on the incorrect dates, or altering the dates listed on the printed copy." Some students asked why Suburban Express chose not to refuse invalid tickets during boarding. Suburban Express said processing during loading would be "too slow." After a backlash from UIUC students, 116 of the suits were withdrawn from Ford County, and later, 20 suits were changed to permit refiling in another venue. Suburban Express indicated it would switch its litigation to Champaign County, so that students would have access to free UIUC legal aid. The company also eliminated convenience fees from the terms of service in response to complaints.

In December 2017, Suburban Express sent an email promoting the benefits of riding, including: "you won’t feel like you’re in China when you’re on our buses." This drew criticism for what many perceived as an anti-Chinese bias. The situation was inflamed when the company sent an apology email which criticized the University of Illinois for enrolling a large number of Chinese students and "selling our university to the highest foreign bidder."

== Lawsuit against Suburban Express by Illinois Attorney General ==
On April 23, 2018, Illinois Attorney General Lisa Madigan filed a lawsuit against Suburban Express in the United States District Court for the Northern District of Illinois alleging violations of the Civil Rights Act of 1964 and claiming other violations.

Suburban Express posted a response to the lawsuit on its Facebook page, stating that it does not discriminate against any protected class, that it has used "Go Home" on English-language posters since 1985, and that it does not post private information online. The company denied that it harasses customers, but said that it defends itself against harassers.

Settlement assistance counsel was appointed to Suburban Express by the court in October 2018. Additionally, Suburban sought and was granted by the court pro bono legal defense against its insurance carrier, Hartford. Hartford had rejected Suburban's insurance claim and sued Suburban so it would not have to pay the cost of Suburban's legal defense.

On April 1, 2019, Suburban Express and new Illinois Attorney General Kwame Raoul reached a settlement in the form of a three-year consent decree, which was approved in court on April 9, 2019. Suburban Express claimed that it had been shaken down by the Illinois Attorney General's Office and threatened a defamation lawsuit against Raoul and a specific subordinate.

== Current status ==
The Suburban Express website remains active as of March 2025.
