= Charles Shoemate =

American businessman (born 1939)

Charles Shoemate (born 1939) is an American businessman. He served as the chairman and chief executive officer of Best Foods, now merged with Unilever, from 1990 to 2000.

== Biography ==
=== Early life ===
Charles Shoemate was born in Illinois in 1939. He graduated from Western Illinois University and received an M.B.A. from the Booth School of Business at the University of Chicago.

=== Career ===
In 1962, he joined Best Foods (originally called CPC International), a food-producing company best known for Hellmann's mayonnaise, Thomas's English Muffins and Knorr soups. In 1988, he became President of Best Foods and joined its board of directors. From 1990 to 2000, he served as its chairman and CEO. During his tenure, it became the largest US-based food producer in the world. He helped with its merger with Unilever, when Unilever bought the company for $24.3 billion.

He sat on the board of directors of Cigna from 1991 to April 27, 2005, International Paper from November 1, 1994 to December 31, 2005, the Chevron Corporation from 1998 until May 30, 2012. He is a member of the Business Roundtable and a former board member of the Grocery Manufacturers Association.

He sits on the board of trustees of the Indian River Medical Center Foundation. A Republican, he supported the presidential campaigns of George H. W. Bush and George W. Bush.

=== Personal life ===
He is married to his college sweetheart, Nancy, and they have three sons.
