= James M. Kilts =

American businessman

James M. Kilts was a chief executive officer of The Gillette Company. He negotiated the sale of the company to Procter & Gamble for US$57 billion. Press investigators estimate that he stood to gain more than $165 million personally in the purchase. Kilts is currently a partner at Centerview Partners, an investment banking and private equity firm based in New York City. In that role he was involved in the sale of Big Heart Pet Brands, and is now looking to raise a special-purpose acquisition company (SPAC) for a new acquisition.

He was then elected to the Board of Directors at The New York Times Company in 2005. He is a member of the Cato Institute Board of Directors.

Kilts is a 1970 graduate of Knox College in Galesburg, Illinois, and received his Master of Business Administration degree from the University of Chicago Booth School of Business. In addition, as an undergraduate student at Knox College, Kilts was also a member of the Delta chapter of Tau Kappa Epsilon fraternity.
