= Dennis Toeppen =

American businessman (born 1964)

- Born: 1964 (age 61–62); Mount Prospect, Illinois, U.S.
- Education: AS, BS, BS, MS, MBA
- Alma mater: University of Illinois at Urbana-Champaign; Northwestern University; University of Chicago
- Years active: 1983–2019
- Known for: Web domain litigation, bus transportation
- Website: toeppen.com

Dennis Toeppen (born 1964) is an American entrepreneur and owner of bus company Suburban Express. He was a party to two cases of first impression relating to domain name registration.

== Early life and education ==
Dennis Eric Toeppen grew up in Mount Prospect, Illinois. He graduated from Prospect High School in 1982 and enrolled at the University of Illinois at Urbana–Champaign, majoring in electrical engineering. He later changed his major to business, and graduated with a BS in Finance in 1987. Thereafter, he attended the University of Illinois at Urbana–Champaign, where he earned a BS in Economics, Northwestern University, where he earned an MS in Transportation, University of Chicago, where he earned an MBA, and Parkland College, where he earned an AS in Construction Management.

== Bus transportation ==
In 1983, Toeppen founded Suburban Express to provide transportation from University of Illinois to Chicago Suburbs. Toeppen attacked monopolist Greyhound Lines using a novel approach not subject to regulation as a public utility. By 1985, Toeppen had captured approximately 50% of Greyhound's ridership.

Toeppen also started Allerton Charter Coach, Inc., a charter bus company with three buses and four vans as of 2014. It operated as a subcontractor for Suburban Express.

Suburban Express and Allerton Charter Coach stopped operating in May 2019. Said Toeppen, "I stopped enjoying this business around 2001, and I think it's beginning to show."

== Domain registration & trademark litigation ==
In 1995, Toeppen registered about 200 internet domain names including some which were similar to well known companies and popular trademarks. Some of them included panavision.com (Panavision), deltaairlines.com (Delta Air Lines), neiman-marcus.com (Neiman Marcus), eddiebauer.com (Eddie Bauer) and yankeestadium.com (New York Yankees). Some of these companies, like Delta Air Lines, paid Toeppen to acquire the domain names from him.

In 1996, Panavision, a camera manufacturing company, sued Toeppen for trademark infringement instead of paying him $13,000 for the domain. In 1998, the court ruled that Toeppen had to relinquish the domain name to Panavision. In a similar case brought in 1996, Intermatic Inc., a timer manufacturing company, sued Toeppen rather than pay him $5,000 for the domain name intermatic.com. The court ruled that the domain be transferred to Intermatic but ruled Intermatic had not proven willful trademark infringement or unfair competition.

Both the Panavision and Intermatic cases were matters of first impression for the U.S. Courts in dealing with trademarks and domain registrations. The practice of registering trademarked words as domains for sale to trademark holders became known as "cybersquatting", a term that was first used by a court in 1998. In November 1999, after the Panavision case had ended, and while Intermatic Inc. v. Toeppen was still pending, the United States gave trademark holders a cause of action against registrants of domain names containing trademarks, in the Anticybersquatting Consumer Protection Act.

By 2023, Toeppen's domain sales from the initial domain registrations totaled more than USD 2 Million.
