= Richard H. Kimball =

American venture capitalist

Richard Kimball is an American venture capitalist and technology investor who is notable for being a founding partner of Technology Crossover Ventures (TCV). He has brought several respected internet brands to market such as Netflix.com. He is a member of the Forbes Midas list.

== Career ==
Kimball financed many start-up Internet companies such as GoDaddy.com, Netflix.com. eHarmony.com, Spotify.com and others through his company named Technology Crossover Ventures. He graduated from Phillips Academy in Andover in 1974 and graduated cum laude from Dartmouth College in 1978 with an A.B. degree in History. He received an M.B.A. degree with an emphasis in finance from the University of Chicago in 1983. He is a member of the Forbes Midas List which is an annual ranking done by the publication which lists the best dealmakers for high tech and life sciences venture capital. He is affiliated with many top firms, often as a director, such as JP Morgan Chase and Intel.
