= Dick Stoken =

American businessman and author

Dick Stoken is an American businessman and author.

== Career ==
A 1958 M.B.A. graduate of the University of Chicago's business school, Stoken has been a member of the Chicago Mercantile Exchange since 1959 and the Chicago Board of Trade since 1971. He is also a founding partner in broker Lind-Waldock and is head of Strategic Capital Management, a commodity trading advisor firm that manages commodity pools and hedge funds.

In the 1960s, Stoken wrote for the Commodity Research Bureau's Year Book on the futures prices of commodities including pork bellies, soybeans, eggs, live cattle and cocoa. His first book, Cycles - What They Are, What They Mean, How to Profit From Them, was published in 1978 after eight years of research, and showed "how you can plan your stock or commodity strategies based on long and short term cycles". His analysis of long-term economic cycles, particularly that at the time of writing, the world was at the late stage of an expansionary phase, and was poised for a depressionary phase, was much commented on for several years following publication. An article by Stoken in the February 1980 issue of Futurist magazine which predicted another major depression was also quoted in mainstream media, particularly the analogy between the "roaring 20s" before the crash of the 1930s, and the affluent, rebellious 1960s and 1970s, and his observation that "as hard times set in, women tend to dress more conservatively."

Stoken's second book, Strategic Investment Timing (1984), was also reported by one investment writer to be the best investment book of the year. It "explained four fundamental indicators that measure the key forces at work in the economy". Another, writing two years later, outlined Stoken's signals to buy and sell on the stock market, and concluded "many investors are glad they bought ... when Stocken [sic] was saying to hold."

== Published works ==
- Cycles - What They Are, What They Mean, How to Profit From Them (1978)
- Strategic Investment Timing (1984)
- The Great Cycle (1993)
- The Great Game of Politics (2004)
- Survival of the Fittest for Investors (2011)
