= Ray Young (executive) =

Ray G. Young is the retired vice chairman and former chief financial officer of Archer Daniels Midland Company, since December 2010. He transferred his CFO responsibilities to an internal successor in April 2022 and he retired as vice chairman at the end of 2022. He was based at ADM's global headquarters in Chicago, Illinois. Prior to ADM, he was the vice president of GM International Operations, based in Shanghai, China, at General Motors. He was named to this position effective February 1, 2010. Previously he served as GM Chief Financial Officer (CFO) since March 3, 2008 until CFO Chris Liddell moved into the position.

Young had been at GM since the 1980s, moving up the ranks throughout his career having been the head of GM do Brasil and Mercosur Region, CFO of General Motors North America, among other positions.

Young is of Chinese Canadian heritage.

== Early years and education ==
Young was born in Port Elgin, Ontario to immigrant parents from Guangzhou, China. He studied at the University of Western Ontario and received his MBA at the University of Chicago Booth School of Business.

== Rise through GM ==
He began his career at GM as a financial analyst in 1986 and promoted in 1988 to GM's offices in New York City. Since then Young has held a number of positions within GM:

- Director of capital markets and foreign exchange (New York)
- Treasurer of GM Europe (Belgium)
- CFO for CAMI Automotive (Canada)
- GM executive liaison with Suzuki (Hamamatsu Japan)
- VP and CFO of GM North America (Detroit)
- President and managing director of GM do Brasil and Mercosur (São Paulo Brazil)
- CFO (Detroit)
- Vice president – International Operations (Shanghai China)

Business positions
Preceded by Frederick Henderson	CFO General Motors; 2008 – 2010	Succeeded by Chris Liddell
