= Hedonology =

Scientific study of pleasure

Hedonology is the proposed scientific study of pleasure, aiming to systematically analyze the nature, causes, and effects of hedonic experiences. The term has been independently employed by several thinkers across different historical and intellectual contexts, each offering distinctive conceptions of its purpose and scope.

== Etymology ==
The neologism hedonology was coined by British philosopher John Grote in the 19th century. Grote introduced the term to describe a science of pleasure that would analyze human experiences of enjoyment using reasoned and systematic methods. This terminological innovation was part of Grote’s broader effort to make philosophical language more precise and utilitarian, akin to the linguistic reforms undertaken by Jeremy Bentham, but with an emphasis on meaning and semantic clarity rather than nominalism.

The Oxford English Dictionary credits Grote with coining or re-coining over sixty terms, including hedonology, hedonics, relativism, and hedonometer, which reflect his efforts to rationalize philosophical vocabulary and the study of human well-being.

== Development and applications ==
=== In moral philosophy ===
Grote's conception of hedonology was closely tied to moral philosophy. In his 1870 work An Examination of the Utilitarian Philosophy, he considered hedonology as a potential basis for ethical systems, particularly those aligned with Benthamite utilitarianism. However, he acknowledged limitations in its explanatory power, especially in comparing qualitative differences in pleasures and addressing the complexities of moral decision-making.

Philosopher Henry Sidgwick later critiqued the notion of hedonology as a science primarily suited to Epicurean or Benthamite frameworks. While he appreciated Grote’s methodical approach to moral philosophy, Sidgwick questioned the scientific validity of hedonology, noting its inability to resolve the deeper complexities of ethical theories and the understanding of others' pleasures.

=== In psychological and physiological studies ===
The Italian physician and anthropologist Paolo Mantegazza also employed the term hedonology, but with a different emphasis. In his writings Mantegazza sought to establish hedonology as a scientific discipline dedicated to the classification and analysis of human pleasures. His methodology ranged from the study of sensory gratification to emotional and intellectual enjoyment, using taxonomic and empirical approaches.

=== Popular culture and other contexts ===
A minor and more anecdotal use of the term occurred in the early 20th century, when an associate of Thomas Edison named Jonas proposed a new science called hedonology aimed at studying human happiness. However, he reportedly believed such a science could only begin when economic conditions—such as the price of gasoline—improved, humorously highlighting practical constraints in pursuing theoretical ideals.

== See also ==
- Utilitarianism
- Philosophy of happiness
- Pleasure principle
