= Tim Vieira =

Portuguese businessman (born 1975)

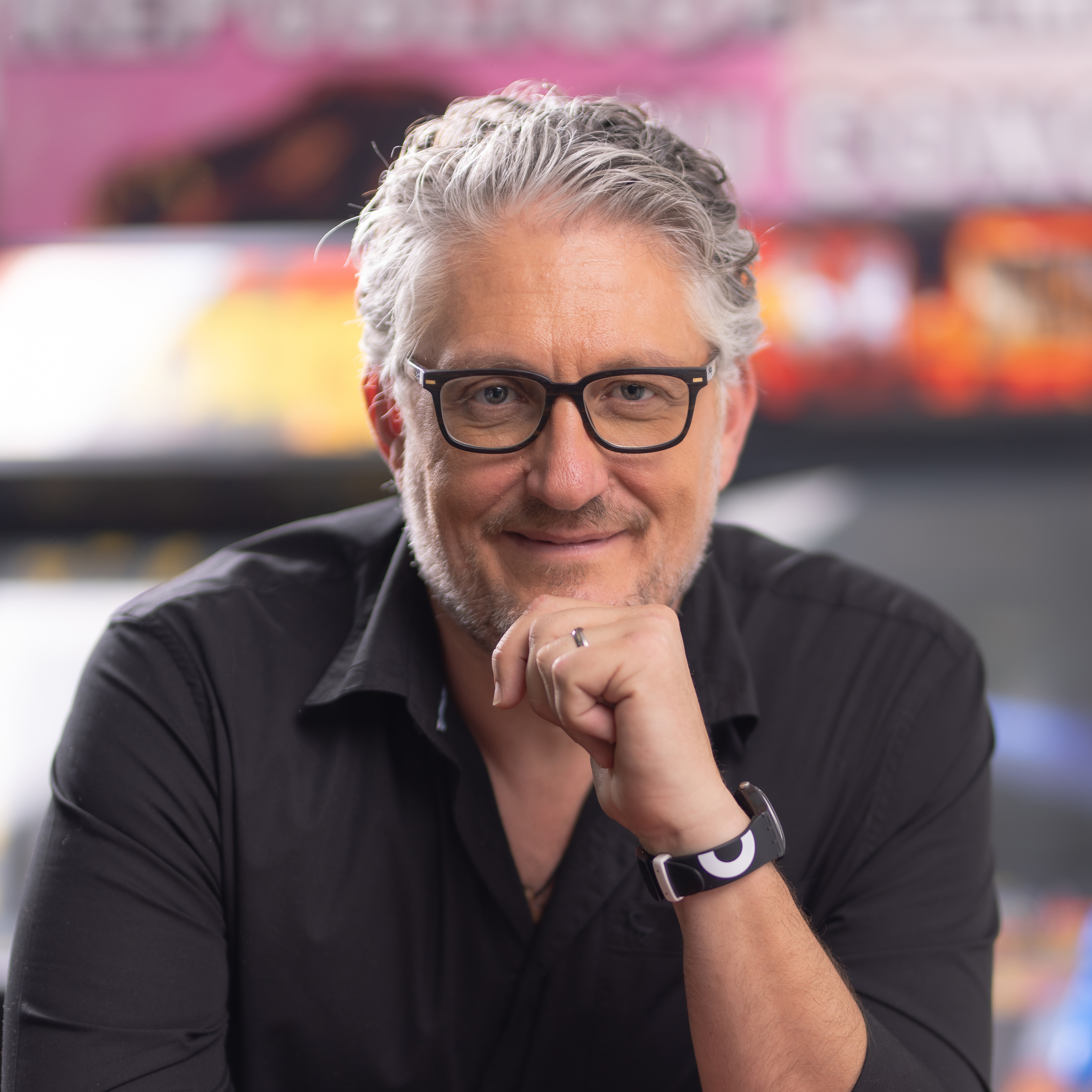
- Vieira in 2023
- Born: Timothy Alexander Vieira; 18 July 1975 (age 51); Johannesburg, South Africa
- Occupation: Businessman
- Website: timvieira.com

Timothy Alexander Vieira (born 18 July 1975) is a Portuguese businessman. Born in South Africa, he worked in Angola before relocating to Portugal in 2009. His business interests include property and telecommunications in Angola, and fruit and public debt in Portugal. He became an investor on the television programme Shark Tank in 2015.

== Personal life and education ==
Vieira was born in Johannesburg, South Africa, to parents of Portuguese origin. His father was an aircraft engineer and his mother had come to the country via Mozambique. He spent his childhood holidays in Portugal, at Portimão on the Algarve and his grandparents' farm in Vila Franca de Xira.

Vieira studied two years of a course in business management and administration at the University of South Africa (UNISA), dropping out to establish a brewery. He completed his course at the University of Chicago Booth School of Business.

As of 2015, Vieira was living in Cascais with his wife and three children. In 2015, he said "I'm a Christian, because I believe in Christ, and that I must act with others in mind. What we give we get back tenfold".

== Career ==
In 1999, Vieira moved to Luanda, Angola. Once the Angolan Civil War ended, he relocated his family to the country, which required Portuguese-speaking professionals. His assets in Angola include the communications company Special Edition, as well as assets in the property and mobile telephone businesses.

Vieira moved to Portugal in 2009. His business interests in the country include raspberries and strawberries grown in the Alentejo, public Wi-Fi on the Lisbon Metro, and the purchase of public debt. In 2012, he established Tim's Garage, a gallery of his collections of automobiles, arcade video games and sporting memorabilia. In 2016, he co-founded CARACOL Studios and was an executive producer on films such as Carga and Sombra.

In 2015, Vieira became an investor on Portugal's version of the television programme Shark Tank, broadcast on SIC. He was the biggest investor in the first series, investing over €1 million.

On 25 April 2024, Vieira announced that he was collecting signatures to run for President of Portugal in the 2026 election, requiring 7,500 signatures in order to be valid. Vieira's proposals, which were classed as centre-right by Sábado magazine, included cutting taxes and shrinking the size of the state, changing the education system and naming Cristiano Ronaldo to the Council of State. On 19 August 2025, he suspended his candidacy, saying that there were already enough candidates who shared his proposals.
