= Dennis H. Chookaszian =

American businessman

Dennis H. Chookaszian is an American businessman and former chairman and CEO of CNA Insurance. He also served as a director on the board of thirteen publicly traded corporations, and currently serves on the board of the Chicago Mercantile Exchange. He is currently a professor of strategic management at the University of Chicago Booth School of Business.

An Eagle Scout, Chookaszian serves on the BSA National Executive Board, the organization's governing board. In 2007 he was awarded the Boy Scouts of America's Silver Buffalo Award for his work with the organization.
