= Roger G. Ibbotson =

Academic

- Born: May 27, 1943 (age 83); Chicago, Illinois, U.S.

Academic background
- Education: University of Chicago, Graduate School of Business, Ph.D., finance and economics, 1974; Indiana University School of Business, M.B.A., finance, 1967; Purdue University, B.S., mathematics, 1965

Roger G. Ibbotson (born May 27, 1943) is Professor Emeritus in Practice of Finance at the Yale School of Management. He is also chairman of Zebra Capital Management LLC. He has written extensively on capital market returns, cost of capital, and international investment. He is the founder, advisor, and former chairman of Ibbotson Associates, now a Morningstar Company. He has written numerous books and articles including Stocks, Bonds, Bills, and Inflation with Rex Sinquefield, which serves as a standard reference for information and capital market returns.

Professor Ibbotson conducts research on a broad range of financial topics, including popularity, liquidity, investment returns, mutual funds, international markets, portfolio management, and valuation. He has recently published Popularity: A Bridge between Classical and Behavioral Finance and Lifetime Financial Advice. He has also co-authored two books with Gary Brinson, Global Investing and Investment Markets. He is a regular contributor and editorial board member to both trade and academic journals.

Professor Ibbotson served on numerous boards and has recently retired as a director, Chairman of the Audit Committee and member of the Nominating Committee of the Dimensional Investment Group Inc. and DFA Investment Dimensions Group Inc., registered investment companies for which Dimensional Fund Advisors Inc. serves as investment adviser. He frequently speaks at universities, conferences, and other forums. He received his bachelor's degree in mathematics from Purdue University, his Master of Business Administration from Indiana University School of Business, and his PhD from the University of Chicago, where he taught for 13 years, and served as executive director of the Center for Research in Security Prices.

== Academic appointments ==
- Professor Emeritus in Practice of Finance, Yale School of Management, 2013 to present
- Professor in Practice of Finance, Yale School of Management, 1984 to 2013
- Senior Lecturer in Finance, University of Chicago, Graduate School of Business, 1979 to 1984
- Executive Director, Center for Research in Security Prices, University of Chicago, 1979 to 1984
- Assistant Professor of Finance, University of Chicago, Graduate School of Business, 1975 to 1979
- Lecturer in Finance, University of Chicago, Graduate School of Business, 1971 to 1975

== Selected books ==
- Stocks, Bonds, Bills, and Inflation (SBBI®) Yearbooks, R.G. Ibbotson Morningstar, Inc. (2007–2015); Duff & Phelps, Wiley (2016)
- Lifetime Financial Advice: Human Capital, Asset Allocation, and Insurance, R. G. Ibbotson, M. A. Milevsky, P. Chen and K. X. Zhu
- The Equity Risk Premium: Essays and Explorations, W. N. Goetzmann and R. G. Ibbotson Oxford University Press, USA 2006 ISBN 0195148142
- Historical US Treasury Yield Curves 1926–1992, T. S. Coleman, L. Fisher, and R. G. Ibbotson Ibbotson Associates, Chicago 1994 ISBN 9781882864027

== Awards and nominations ==
- Markowitz Award Prize for 2015 Best Article in Journal of Investment Management,
  selected by Nobel Prize Winners Harry M. Markowitz, Robert C. Merton, Myron S. Scholes, and William F. Sharpe
- Graham and Dodd 2014 Award for Best article in Financial Analysts Journal
- Financial Analysts Journal, Graham and Dodd Scrolls, 1979, 1982, 1985, 2001, 2004, 2007, 2012, 2013;
- Best Perspectives Article 2011
- Whitebox Advisors Best Research Paper 2011 Finalist
- Investment Advisor, “Thirty for Thirty Most Influential People,” 2010
- Portable Alpha Board of Governors’ Hall of Fame, 2006
- Alternative Investment Summit, The Paper of the Year Award, 2006
- Pensions & Investments, one of 20 people who "literally changed pension funds, institutional investing and/or money management", 2003
- Journal of Financial Economics, All-Star Paper, 2002
- AIMR 2001 James R. Vertin Award for research notable for enduring value and relevance to investment practitioners
- Academy of Alumni Fellows, Indiana University Kelley School of Business, 2001
- Worth's Magazine “Wall Street's 25 Smartest Players,” 1999
- Co-Winner, 1992 Review of Financial Studies Award
- Investment Education Institute, Distinguished Service Award in the field of Economics, 1986
