= Robert W. Lane =

Former CEO of Deere & Company (born 1949)

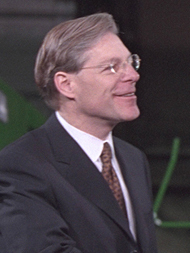
- Lane in 2002
- Born: November 14, 1949 (age 76); Washington, D.C., U.S.
- Education: Wheaton College; University of Chicago
- Occupation: Former CEO of Deere & Company
- Spouse: Patricia

Robert W. Lane (born November 14, 1949) is the former chief executive officer of Deere & Company from 2000 to 2009. He retired as the chairman of the board in February 2010. He served on several boards including: The Northern Trust Company, General Electric Company, BMW AG and Verizon Communications. He was ranked 10th by Forbes Magazine's Top CEOs based on compensation in 2009.

== Early life and career ==
Lane was born in Washington, D.C., in 1949. He graduated with high honors from Wheaton College in Illinois in the year 1972, and he went on to receive a Master of Business Administration degree from the University of Chicago Graduate School of Business in 1974. Lane joined First National Bank of Chicago after his MBA. He served in the capacity of Vice President when he quit the job in 1982.

=== Board memberships ===
Lane served on several boards before retiring for health reasons:

- BMW AG (2009 - May 2018)
- General Electric Company (2005–2017)
- The Northern Trust Company (2009–2015)
- Verizon Communications (2004–2017)

== Deere & Company ==
Lane came to Deere & Company in 1982 from a commercial banking career with First National Bank of Chicago. On his first assignment at Deere, Lane was responsible for managing U.S. government and national account sales. In 1992, he joined the Worldwide Agricultural Equipment division as senior vice president where he directed equipment operations in Latin America, Australia, East Asia and South Africa.

Lane became Chief Financial Officer of Deere in 1996, and two years later moved to Germany as Managing director where he led Deere's agricultural equipment operations in Europe, Africa, the Middle East, India and the nations of the former Soviet Union. He returned to the United States as president of the Worldwide Agricultural Equipment Division in 1999; subsequently he was elected Deere & Company's President and Chief Operating Officer. In June 2000 Lane was named president and CEO of Deere & Company, and he was elected chairman of the board the following August. He was also a trustee for the Committee for Economic Development.

During his tenure the revenues of the company doubled its net income to more than $2 billion.

== Awards ==
- Corporate Award by University of Chicago Booth School of Business, 2007
- Chicago Bridge Award, 2007
- Lane was inducted as a Laureate of The Lincoln Academy of Illinois and awarded the Order of Lincoln (the State's highest honor) by the Governor of Illinois in 2013 in the area of Business & Industry.
