= Bernard Yeung =

Hong Kong-born American economist (born 1953)

- Born: September 9, 1953 (age 72)
- Education: University of Western Ontario; University of Chicago's Booth School of Business
- Occupations: Economist, academic

Bernard Yin Yeung (Chinese: 杨贤; pinyin: Yáng Xián; born September 9, 1953) is a Hong Kong-born American economist and academic. He was the dean of the NUS Business School from June 2008 to May 2019, where he is also the Stephen Riady Distinguished Professor.

== Early life ==
Bernard Yeung was born in Hong Kong in 1953, where he also spent his childhood. He graduated from the University of Western Ontario, where he earned a bachelor's degree in mathematics and economics in 1979. He earned a master in business administration followed by a PhD from the Booth School of Business at the University of Chicago.

== Career ==
Yeung was an associate professor at the University of Alberta from 1986 to 1988, and he was a professor of international business at the University of Michigan's Ross School of Business from 1988 to 1999. He was the Abraham Krasnoff Professor in Global Business, Economics and Management at New York University's Stern School of Business from 1999 to 2010.

Yeung was the dean of the NUS Business School from June 2008 to May 2019, where he is also the Stephen Riady Distinguished Professor. He served as President of the Asian Bureau of Finance and Economic Research (ABFER) from 2014 to 2023. He is also the Honorary Co-Chair of Guanghua School of Management at Peking University. Additionally, he has been an advisory university professor at East China Normal University since 2006.

== Personal life ==
Yeung is a naturalized U.S. citizen.
