= 6 (disambiguation) =

6 is a number, numeral, and glyph.

6 or six may also refer to:

- AD 6, the sixth year of the AD era
- 6 BC, the sixth year before the AD era
- The month of June
- The base of the senary, or base-6, number system.

== Science ==
- Carbon, the element with atomic number 6
- 6 Hebe, an asteroid

== People ==
- Alphonse Six (1890–1914), Belgian football player
- Andrew Six (1965–1997), American serial killer
- Didier Six (born 1954), former French international footballer
- Franz Six (1909–1975), Nazi official
- Frederick N. Six (born 1929), justice of the Kansas Supreme Court
- Henri Six (1877–1942), Belgian Commander during WWII and olympic fencer
- James Six (1731–1793), British scientist
- Jan Six (1616–1700), cultural figure in the Dutch Golden Age
- Robert Six (1907–1986), CEO of Continental Airlines between 1936 and 1981
- Regine Sixt, German businessperson
- Valérie Six (born 1963), French politician
- Perri 6, British social scientist
- Six family, family of regents of Amsterdam, founded by Jan Six

== Music ==
- 6ix (band), an American group who worked with Sly Stone
- Six (band), an Irish pop band created by a TV reality show
- Six (musical), a musical about the six wives of King Henry VIII
- BBC Radio 6 Music, a British alternative music radio station
- #6, the pseudonym of American musician Shawn Crahan, when performing with Slipknot

=== Albums ===
- 6 (After Crying album), 1997
- 6 (Amir Tataloo album), 2015
- 6 (Garmarna album), 2016
- 6 (Hadag Nachash album), 2010
- 6 (Mucc album), 2006
- 6 (Pigface album), 2009
- 6 (Soil & "Pimp" Sessions album), 2009
- 6 (Supersilent album), 2003
- 6 (The Ex album), 1991
- 6, an album by Yuridia, 2015
- Six (Dream Evil album), 2017
- Six (Extreme album), 2023
- Six (Loverboy album), 1997
- Six (Mansun album), 1998
- Six (Soft Machine album), 1973
- Six (The Black Heart Procession album), 2009
- Six (Tony Banks album)
- Six (Whodini album)

=== Songs ===
- "Six" (song), a 1999 song by Mansun
- "Six", by All That Remains from their album The Fall of Ideals
- "Six", by Chimaira from their album Resurrection
- "6ix", by The Lemonheads from their album Car Button Cloth
- "Six", by the cast of the musical Six

== Fiction ==
=== Film ===
- 6 (film), a 2013 Tamil crime thriller
- Six (film), a 2012 Telugu suspense thriller

=== Character ===
- Number 6 (The Prisoner), the main character of The Prisoner
- Number Six (Battlestar Galactica), a character in the science fiction television series Battlestar Galactica
- Six, a witch woman in Terry Goodkind's novel Phantom
- Six, a character in the television series Blossom
- Six, a character in the television series Tripping the Rift
- Six, a character in the television series Generator Rex
- Six, a character in the web series MechWest
- Six, the protagonist of the horror-adventure video game series Little Nightmares.
- Noble Six, a SPARTAN super-soldier in the game Halo: Reach

=== Group ===
- Six, a breed of superhumans in Philip K. Dick's novel Flow My Tears, the Policeman Said
- Sixers, a splinter faction in the television series Terra Nova
- Sinister Six, a group of supervillains in Marvel Comics
- Oración Seis (disambiguation) lit. 'Prayer Six', various groups in the works by Hiro Mashima

=== Other use ===
- No. 6, a Japanese manga by Atsuko Asano
- Six (TV series), a History channel series about United States Navy SEALs

== Transportation ==
=== Automobiles ===
- BMW 6 Series, a German mid-size luxury car series
- Mazda6, a Japanese mid-size car
- Mercedes-Maybach 6, a German concept grand tourer
- DS 6, a French crossover SUV
- Rover 6, a small British two-seater 6-horsepower car
- Various full-sized cars produced by General Motors:
  - Buick Six, a luxury car
  - Oldsmobile Six, a luxury car
  - Oakland Six, a passenger car
  - Pontiac 6, a passenger car
- Rambler Six, a passenger car manufactured by the American Motor Corporation
- Chrysler Six, a series of full-sized automobiles
  - DeSoto Six, a series of full-sized automobiles initially offered as a rebadged Chrysler Six
- Panther 6, a six-wheeled convertible

=== Engines ===
- Straight-six engine
- V6 engine

=== Public transportation ===
- 6 (New York City Subway service), a service of the New York City Subway

== Other uses ==
- No. 6 novel, manga and anime series
- No.6 Records
- SIX (Slovak Internet eXchange), a Slovak internet exchange point
- SIX, the stock market symbol for Six Flags
- Six, West Virginia, an unincorporated community in McDowell County
- Six Lake, a lake in Minnesota
- Six (cricket), a boundary shot in cricket
- SIX Swiss Exchange, Switzerland's principal stock exchange
- Six, the U.S. Army radio call sign of a company or battalion commander
- 6 (BMT rapid transit service)
- 6 (New York City Subway service)
- Sony SIX, a sports channel in India
- "Watch your six" or "on your six", references to "behind" (with "12" being "ahead") originally from aviation/clock-position terms
- Six, a peer-led sub-unit of a Cub Scout or Brownie Guide Pack.

== See also ==
- 06 (disambiguation)
- 6.0 (disambiguation)
- List of highways numbered 6
- Number Six (disambiguation)
- SIX (disambiguation)
- Year Six
- The Six (disambiguation)
- Sixt
- Sick (disambiguation) (including uses of Sicks)
- System 6, a release of Mac OS
- System 6 (word processor), a word processor from IBM
- Sixes (disambiguation)
