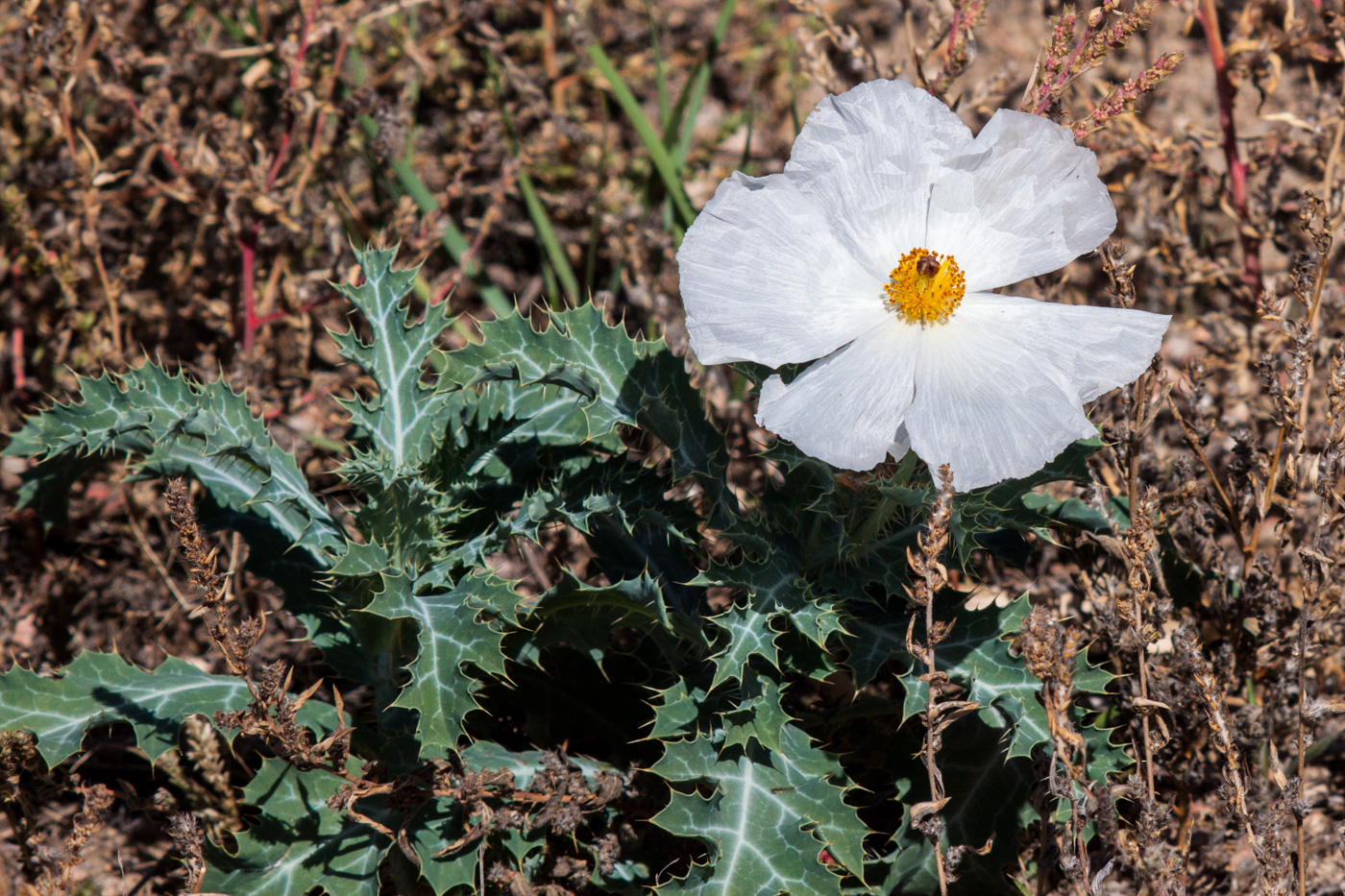

Conservation status
- Apparently Secure (NatureServe)

Scientific classification
- Kingdom: Plantae
- Clade: Tracheophytes
- Clade: Angiosperms
- Clade: Eudicots
- Order: Ranunculales
- Family: Papaveraceae
- Genus: Argemone
- Species: A. polyanthemos

Binomial name
- Argemone polyanthemos (Fedde) Ownbey

Synonyms
- Argemone intermedia var. polyanthemos Fedde; Argemone mexicana var. albiflora A.Gray; Argemone polyanthemos f. rosea Waterf.

= Argemone polyanthemos =

Species of flowering plant

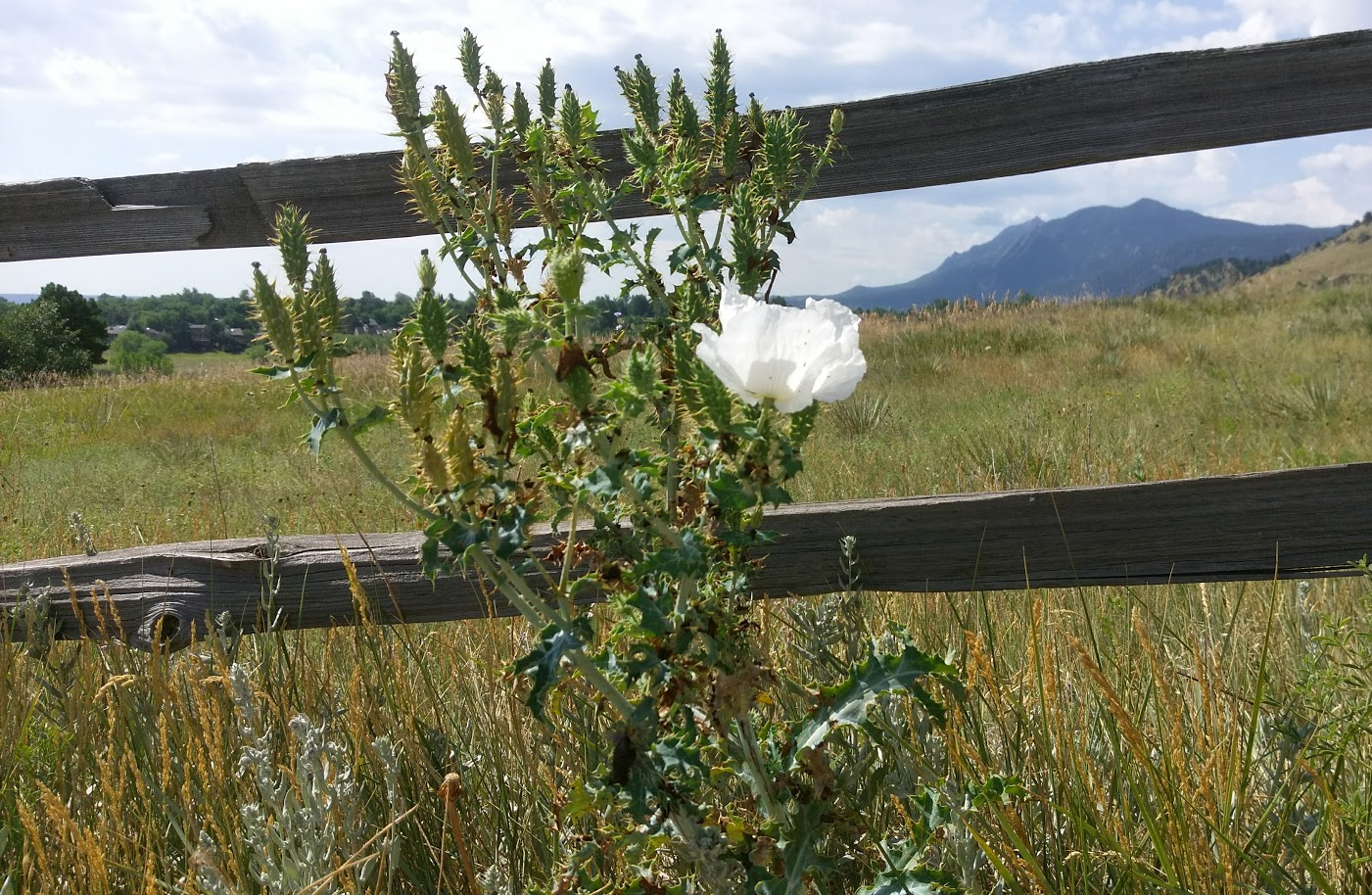
Argemone polyanthemos growing beside a trail in Boulder, CO in the Southwestern USA.

Argemone polyanthemos, the crested pricklypoppy, also known as bluestem prickly poppy, pricklypoppy, white prickly poppy, annual pricklypoppy, or as thistle poppy is an annual plant with yellow sap and showy white flowers in the poppy family (Papaveraceae).

== Distribution ==
It can be found in areas with dry soil from Texas northward to North Dakota and as far west as Washington State. It has spread or been introduced to areas adjacent to its natural range, which was primarily east of the Rocky Mountains in the shortgrass and mixed grass prairies.

== Description ==
One of the distinguishing characteristics is the absence of prickles on upper leaf surfaces, though as with all species in the genus it has many prickles on stems and leaf margins. Plants are variable in height, but often grow to one meter, with exceptional individuals reaching 1.2 meters with deeply lobed 20 cm leaves. The leaves and stems are pale blue green. The 7-10 cm flowers bloom from late spring into summer. Each flower has 4-6 very thin translucent white petals that flutter in the wind and a dense center cluster of yellow stamens. In late summer the plant has sparsely prickly seed capsules with small black seeds. Broken or nicked stems produce thick orange-yellow sap. It has a large taproot for accessing water in freely draining soils. All parts of the plant are poisonous. Because of its prickly defenses, and acrid taste from its poisons, grazing animals tend to avoid it, so it increases in numbers compared to other plants in grazed areas.

Argemone polyanthemos is not a long lived plant. Some individuals bloom in the first year of growth, but most bloom quite heavily in the second year of growth and then die. Occasionally, with adequate moisture, a plant will form new buds underground and sprout again.

== Taxonomy ==
Argemone polyanthemos was scientifically described as a subspecies and named Argemone mexicana var. albiflora by Asa Gray in 1860. However, this was a taxonomic illegitimate name, because it had already been used by Augustin Pyramus de Candolle in 1821. This description had also not covered all of what is presently recognized as Argemone polyanthemos. It was again described as a subspecies in 1909 by Friedrich Karl Georg Fedde as Argemone intermedia var. polyanthemos, this time covering all of the presently recognized species. It was finally recognized as a separate species from Argemone intermedia in 1958 in a paper published by the botanist Francis Marion Ownbey, the accepted name and classification of these plants.

== Usage ==
Argemone polyanthemos is sometimes planted in gardens as an ornamental plant for its long succession of showy blooms. It grows well in sandy or gravelly soil of somewhat poor quality with little to no supplemental watering. It dislikes being transplanted and seed is placed outside by growers on the soil surface before the last frost date.
