= Mexican poppy =

Mexican poppy is a common name for several plants and may refer to:

- Hunnemannia species
- Argemone mexicana
- Argemone ochroleuca
