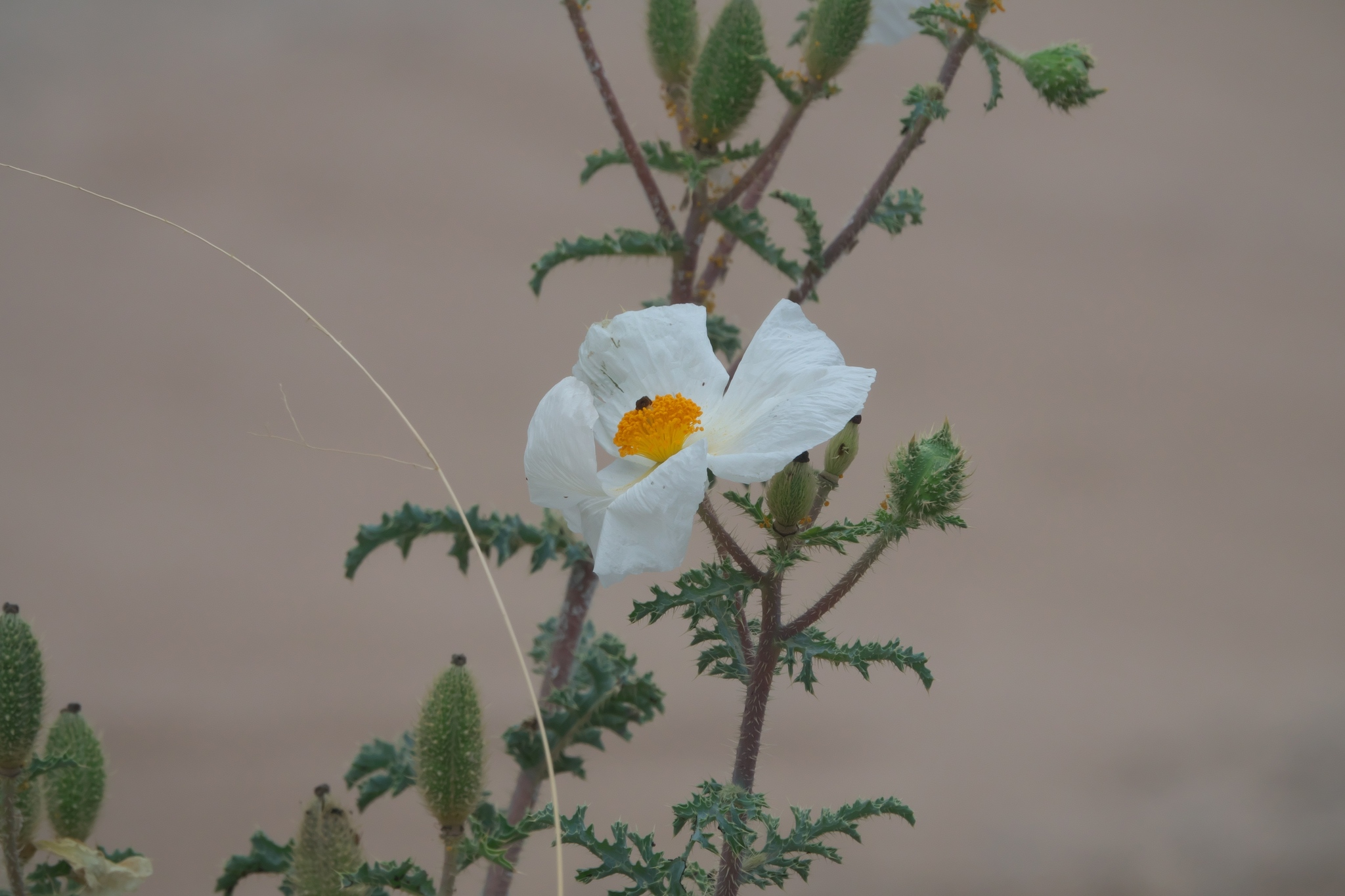

Scientific classification
- Kingdom: Plantae
- Clade: Tracheophytes
- Clade: Angiosperms
- Clade: Eudicots
- Order: Ranunculales
- Family: Papaveraceae
- Genus: Argemone
- Species: A. pleiacantha

Binomial name
- Argemone pleiacantha Greene

= Argemone pleiacantha =

Species of flowering plant

Argemone pleiacantha is a species of flowering plant in the poppy family known by the common name southwestern prickly poppy. It is native to Arizona and New Mexico in the United States and Chihuahua, and Sonora in Mexico, where it occurs in dry woodlands and slopes of foothills and mountains. It is an annual or perennial herb with branching, erect stems up to 1.5 meters tall. The plant is covered in prickles, often densely. The blue-green leaves are divided into sharp, toothlike lobes. The flower buds are up to 2 centimeters long and covered in prickles. They bloom into showy white-petalled flowers which may be up to 16 centimeters wide. The fruit is a capsule up to 4.5 centimeters long which is covered in prickles.

There are two subspecies of this plant.

- A. p. ssp. pleiacantha is the only subspecies to occur in Mexico.
- A. p. ssp. ambigua is endemic to Arizona.

The Sacramento prickly poppy has traditionally been recognized as a third subspecies, A. p. ssp. pinnatisecta, but was recently raised to specific rank based on genetic analyses. This is a rare species known only from the western slope of the Sacramento Mountains in New Mexico. It is treated as a federally listed endangered species in the United States.
