= N6 =

N6 may refer to:

== Roads ==
- N6 (Bangladesh)
- N6 road (Belgium), a National Road in Belgium connecting Brussels over Halle, Soignies, and Mons
- N6 road (France)
- N6 road (Gabon)
- N6 road (Ghana)
- N6 road (Ireland)
- N6 road (Luxembourg)
- N6 road (Senegal)
- N6 road (South Africa), a national road connecting East London and Bloemfontein
- N6 road (Switzerland)

== Other ==
- N6 (Long Island bus)
- N6, a postcode district in the N postcode area
- N6, TSMC's 6 nm semiconductor fabrication node
- SP&S Class N-6, a steam locomotives class
- USS N-6 (SS-58), a 1917 N-class coastal defense submarine of the United States Navy
- Neapolitan sixth, a chord in music
- N_{6}, the chemical formula of hexazine, a hypothetical allotrope of nitrogen
- N_{6}, the chemical formula of hexanitrogen, an allotrope of nitrogen reported in 2025
- n−6 or omega−6 fatty acid
- LNER Class N6, a class of British steam locomotives

== See also ==
- 6N (disambiguation)

N06 may refer to:

- ATC code N06 Psychoanaleptics, a subgroup of the Anatomical Therapeutic Chemical Classification System
- Isolated proteinuria with specified morphological lesion ICD-10 code
- Laurel Airport (Delaware), FAA Location Identifier: N06
- N°6, a shortening for Number Six
