= 006 (disambiguation) =

006 is the code name of Alec Trevelyan, a villain in the James Bond film GoldenEye.

006 may also refer to:

- The number six (6)
- Agent 006 in the James Bond universe, other than Alec Trevelyan; see 00 Agent
- Tyrrell 006, a 1972 Formula One season car
- BAR 006, a 2004 Formula One season car
- Singapore Airlines Flight 006, a scheduled passenger flight
- China Airlines Flight 006, a daily non-stop flight

== See also ==
- Six (disambiguation)
