= 6N =

6N or 6-N may refer to:

- 6N or 6°N, the 6th parallel north latitude
- Nordic Airways, IATA airline designator
- List of highways numbered 6N
  - U.S. Route 6N
  - U.S. Route 6 in New York
  - US 6N (NY), see U.S. Route 209 in New York
- Six Nations Championship, the annual northern hemisphere rugby union competition sometimes abbreviated as 6N
- ER-6n, a model of Kawasaki Ninja 650R
- Extrom 6N, see Caprolactam
- Typ 6N, internal corporate name for Volkswagen Polo Mk3
- 6N caves, see List of caves in Western Australia
- 6N, the production code for the 1984 Doctor Who serial Frontios

== See also ==
- N6 (disambiguation)
