= 6O =

6O or 6-O can refer to:

- 6O, IATA code for Air Satellite
- 6-O-Methylguanine
- 6-O-methylnorlaudanosoline 5'-O-methyltransferase
- 6-O-arabinopyranosylglucopyranoside; see Vicianin
- 6-O-Methylesculetin; see Scopoletin
- 6-O-palmitoylascorbic acid; see Ascorbyl palmitate
- 6-O-(alpha-L-rhamnopyranosyl)-D-glucopyranose; see Rutinose
- 6-O-Alpha-D-Glucopyranosyl-D-Fructofuranose; see Isomaltulose
- 6-O-sulfation, a phenomenon occurring in Heparan sulfate

== See also ==
- O6 (disambiguation)
- 60
