= Oracion (disambiguation) =

Oracion may refer to:

- Oracion, a 1988 Japanese childrens' horse racing drama film
- Edwin Oracion Panergo (born 1971), Filipino Catholic prelate
- Leo Oracion (born 1974), Filipino mountaineer and sportsman

== See also ==
- Oración Seis (disambiguation)
