= 6ix =

6ix may refer to:

- The 6ix, a nickname for Toronto, Ontario, Canada
- 6IX (radio station), in Perth, Western Australia
- 6ix (record producer) (Arjun Ivatury, born 1991), an American record producer
- Fly 6ix, a former airline

== See also ==
- 6 (disambiguation)
- The Six (disambiguation)
