= SIX =

SIX may refer to:

== Computing ==
- Seattle Internet Exchange
- Slovak Internet eXchange
- Slovenian Internet Exchange
- Swiss Internet Exchange

== Finance ==
- SIX Financial Information, a financial data vendor company headquartered in Zürich, Switzerland; a subsidiary of SIX Group
- SIX Group, a key financial market infrastructure company in Switzerland
- SIX Interbank Clearing, operator of Swiss Interbank Clearing; a subsidiary of SIX Group
- SIX Swiss Exchange, Switzerland's principal stock exchange; a subsidiary of SIX Group

== Television ==
- SIX (Sports Channel)
- Six (TV series), an American television drama series
- Six TV, the sixth free to air terrestrial television channel in the UK

== Other ==
- Six (musical), stylized as SIX

== See also ==
- 6 (disambiguation)
