= O6 =

O6 or O-6 may refer to:

- LNER Class O6, a class of British steam locomotives
- O6 star, a subclass of O-class stars
- OceanAir IATA airline designator
- O-6, a pay grade in the US uniformed services:
  - Colonel in the Army, Marine Corps, Air Force, and Space Force
  - Captain in the Navy, Coast Guard, Public Health Service Commissioned Corps, and NOAA Commissioned Officer Corps
- the "Occupied 6", an Irish republican euphemism for Northern Ireland
- USS O-6 (SS-67), an O-class submarine of the United States Navy
- Otoyol 6, a motorway in Turkey

== See also ==
- 06 (disambiguation)
- 6O (disambiguation)
