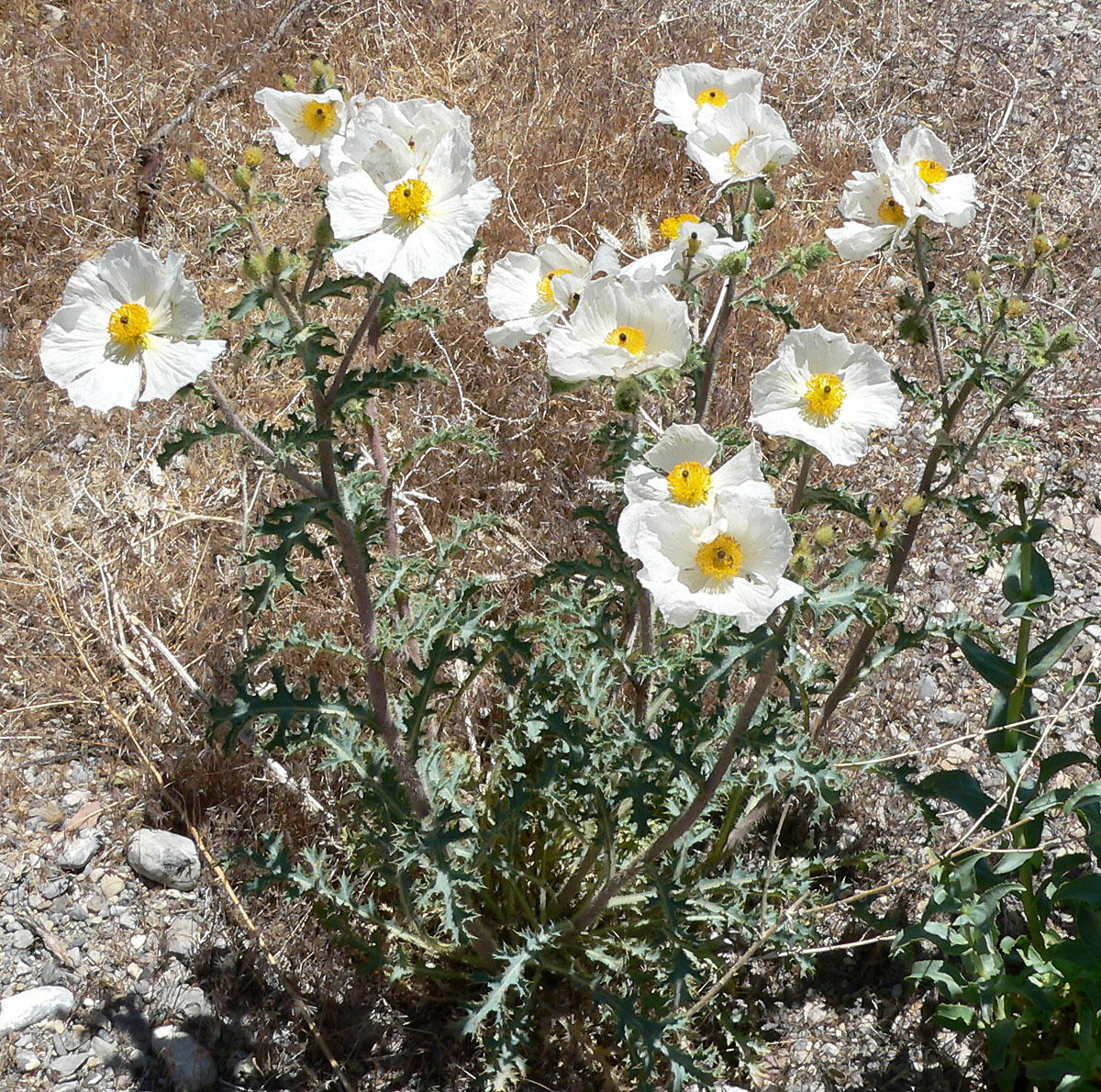

Scientific classification
- Kingdom: Plantae
- Clade: Tracheophytes
- Clade: Angiosperms
- Clade: Eudicots
- Order: Ranunculales
- Family: Papaveraceae
- Genus: Argemone
- Species: A. munita

Binomial name
- Argemone munita Dur. & Hilg.

= Argemone munita =

Species of flowering plant

Argemone munita is a species of prickly poppy known by the common names flatbud prickly poppy and chicalote. "Munita" means "armed", in reference to the many long prickles. This flower is native to California, where it is widespread throughout the western part of the state and its eastern deserts, on slopes to 10,000 feet, and along roadsides. Its range also extends into Baja California, Arizona, and Nevada.

This poppy bears its flowers on erect, spiny stems which can exceed a meter in height. The sap is yellow. The blue-green or mint-green, lobed leaves are also very prickly. The white poppy blooms usually have six crinkly petals, each up to 4 centimeters long, and three sepals. The center of the flower is surrounded by a dense ring of up to 250 small yellow or orange stamens bearing the pollen. The flowers are often compared to sunny-side-up eggs, with the dark pistil in the center as a dot of pepper. The fruits are spiny white capsules 3 to 5 centimeters long, each containing many small seeds. The leaves and seeds contain alkaloids which are probably toxic.

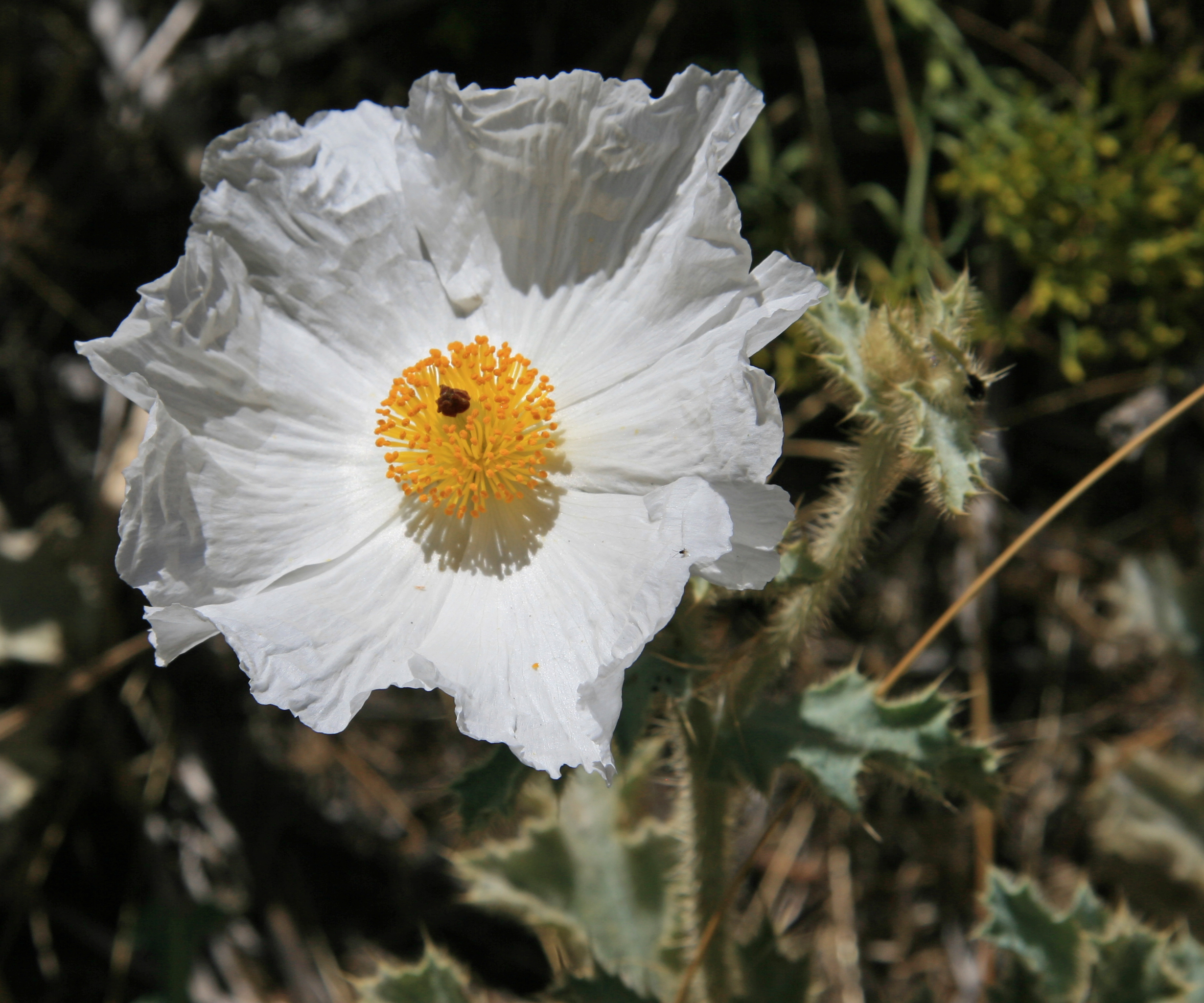
crinkly white petals

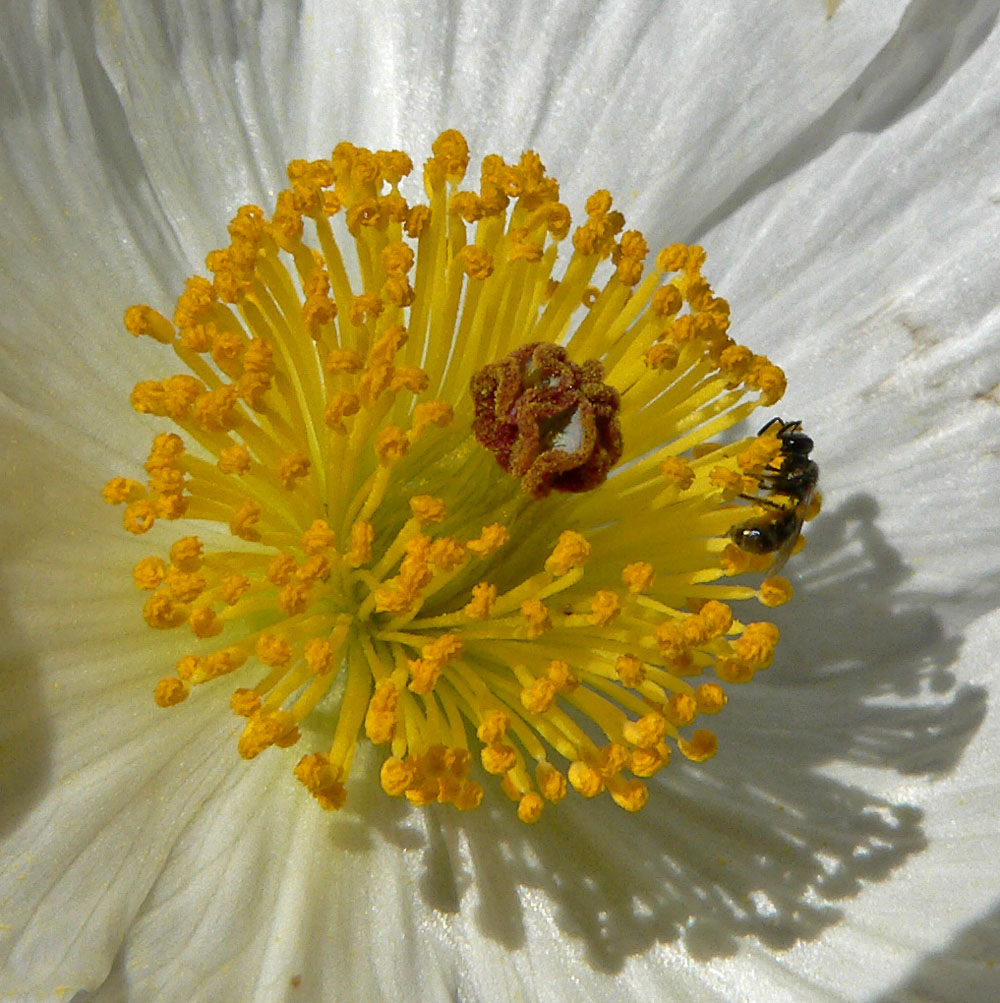
many stamens

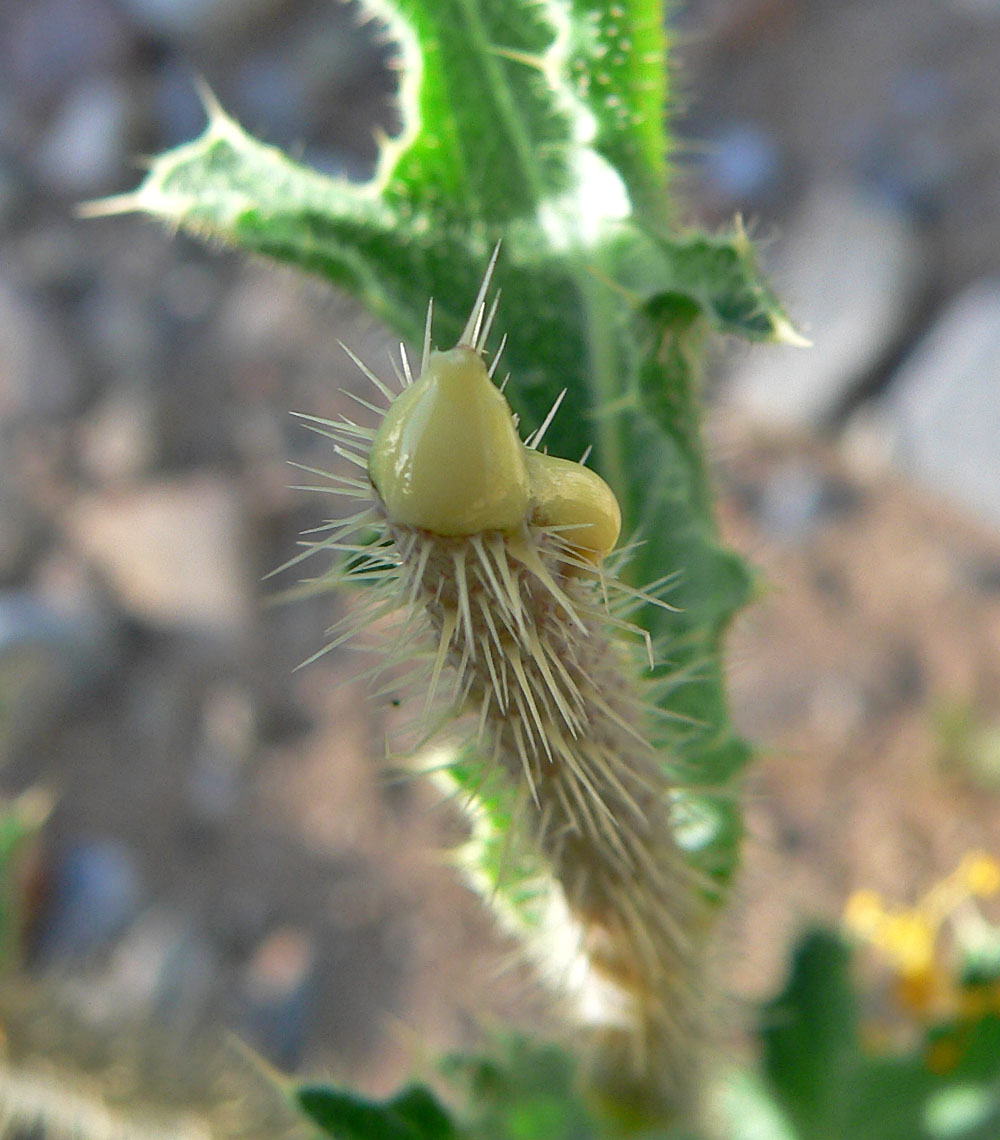
yellow sap, on capsule

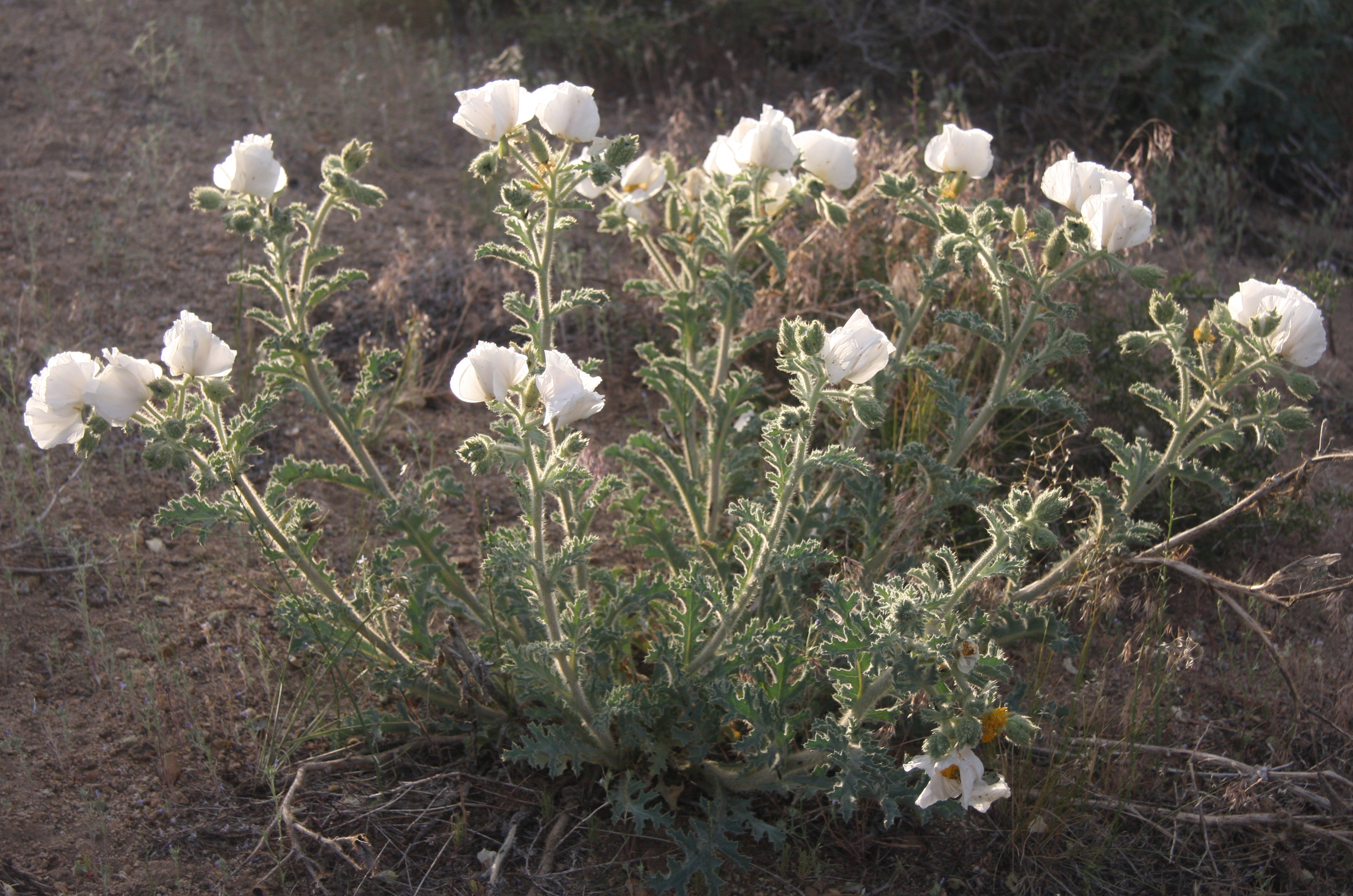
plant backlit, prickly leaves

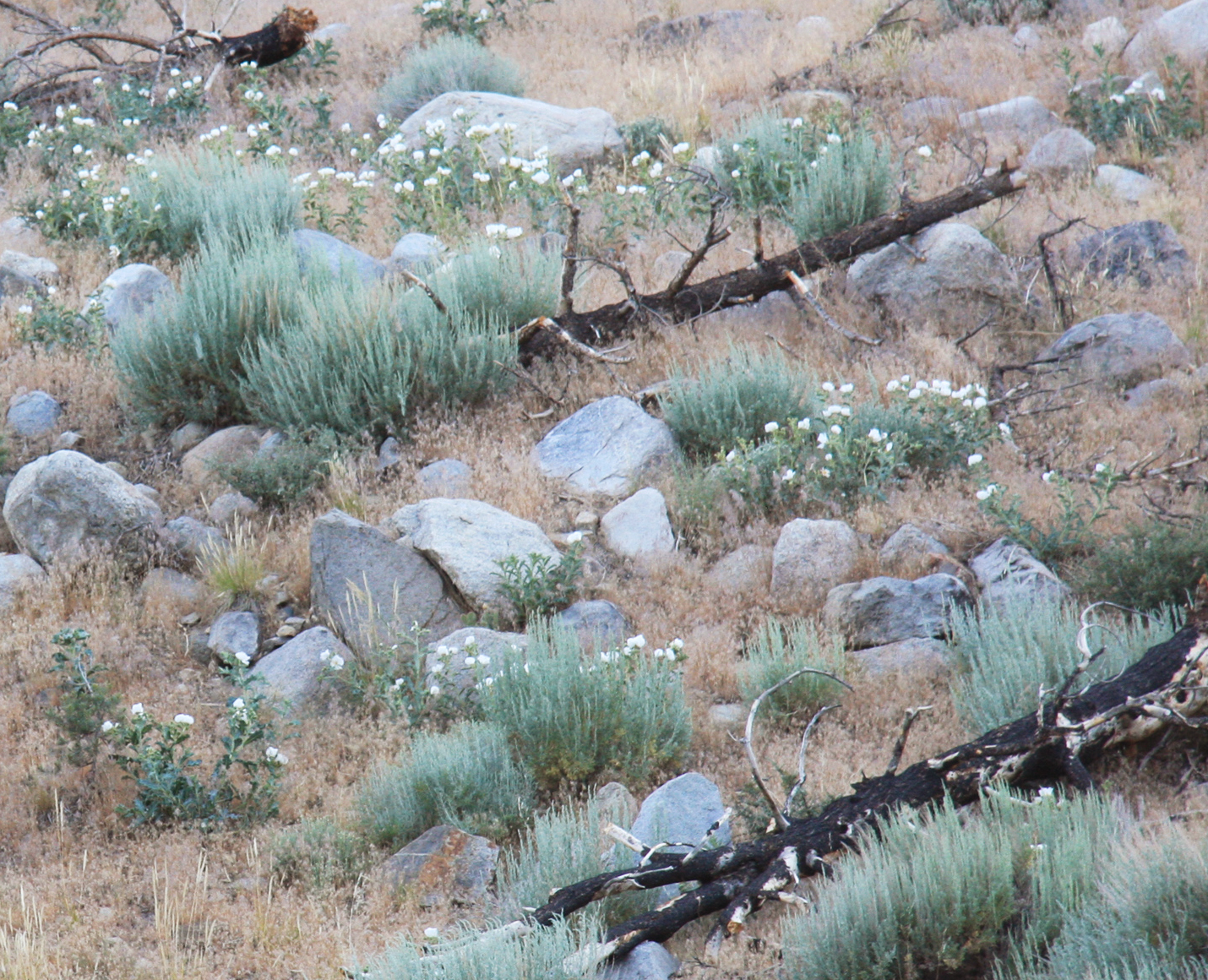
return bloom after fire
