= 6.0 =

6.0 may refer to:

- 6.0, a numerical designation commonly used for computer software versioning
- 6.0 (album), an album by Sister Machine Gun
- 6.0 system, a judgement system used in competitive figure skating until 2005
- 6, a natural number

== See also ==
- 6 (disambiguation)
