= 6-O-methylnorlaudanosoline 5'-O-methyltransferase =

Class of enzymes

Identifiers
- EC no.: 2.1.1.121
- CAS no.: 89511-99-9

Databases
- BRENDA: enzyme data
- ExPASy: NiceZyme view
- KEGG: enzyme entry
- MetaCyc: metabolic pathway
- Rhea: reactions
- PDB structures: RCSB PDB PDBe PDBsum
- Gene Ontology: AmiGO / QuickGO
Search
- PMC: articles
- PubMed: articles
- NCBI: proteins

In enzymology, a 6-O-methylnorlaudanosoline 5'-O-methyltransferase (EC number 2.1.1.121) is an enzyme that catalyzes the chemical reaction:

S-adenosyl-L-methionine + 6-O-methylnorlaudanosoline $\rightleftharpoons$ S-adenosyl-L-homocysteine + nororientaline

Thus, the two substrates of this enzyme are S-adenosyl methionine and 6-O-methylnorlaudanosoline, whereas its two products are S-adenosylhomocysteine and nororientaline.

This enzyme is produced by the flowering plant Argemone platyceras and it participates in alkaloid biosynthesis.

== Nomenclature ==
This enzyme belongs to the family of transferases, specifically those transferring one-carbon group methyltransferases. The systematic name of this enzyme class is S-adenosyl-L-methionine:6-O-methylnorlaudanosoline 5'-O-methyltransferase.
