= 06 =

06 may refer to:

- 6 (number)
- The month of June, commonly referred to as 06
- The years 1906 and 2006, both commonly referred to as '06
- Lynk & Co 06, a Chinese subcompact SUV
- Sonic the Hedgehog (2006 video game), a 2006 game commonly referred to as Sonic '06 to differentiate it from the original 1991 game
- O-Six, a female gray wolf shot by a hunter in Wyoming which led to extensive media coverage due to her popularity
- "Oh-Six", a song by Moka Only from Desired Effect, 2006
- Whanganui, New Zealand, which has the telephone area code 06

== See also ==
- O6 (disambiguation)
- 6 (disambiguation)
