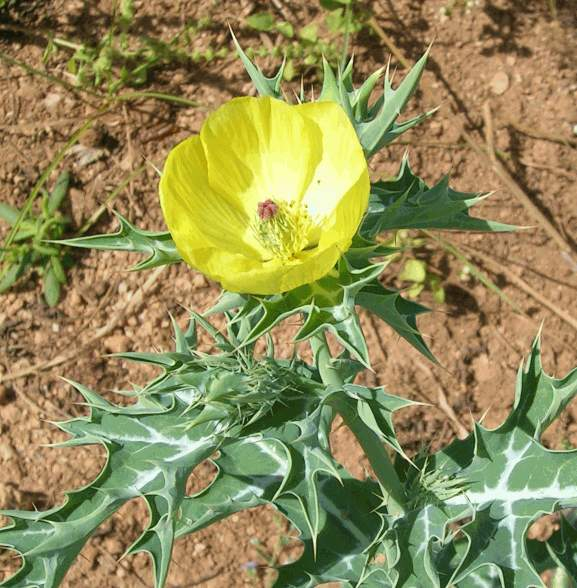
- Argemone subfusiformis

Scientific classification
- Kingdom: Plantae
- Clade: Tracheophytes
- Clade: Angiosperms
- Clade: Eudicots
- Order: Ranunculales
- Family: Papaveraceae
- Subfamily: Papaveroideae
- Tribe: Papavereae
- Genus: Argemone; L.

Species
- See text

= Argemone =

Genus of flowering plants

Argemone is a genus of flowering plants in the family Papaveraceae commonly known as prickly poppies. There are about 32 species native to the Americas and Hawaii. The generic name originated as ἀργεμώνη in Greek and was applied by Dioscorides to a poppy-like plant used to treat cataracts.

== Selected species ==
- Argemone aenea G.B. Ownbey – golden prickly poppy
- Argemone albiflora Hornem – bluestem prickly poppy
  - Argemone albiflora subsp. albiflora
  - Argemone albiflora subsp. texana G.B.Ownbey
- Argemone arizonica G.B.Ownbey – Arizona prickly poppy
- Argemone aurantiaca G.B.Ownbey – Texas prickly poppy
- Argemone chisosensis G.B.Ownbey – Chisos Mountain prickly poppy
- Argemone corymbosa Greene – Mojave prickly poppy
  - Argemone corymbosa subsp. arenicola
  - Argemone corymbosa subsp. corymbosa
- Argemone glauca (Nutt. ex Prain) Pope – pua kala (Hawaii)
  - Argemone glauca var. decipiens G.B.Ownbey
  - Argemone glauca var. glauca (Nutt. ex Prain) Pope
- Argemone gracilenta Greene – Sonoran prickly poppy
- Argemone hispida A.Gray – rough prickly poppy
- Argemone mexicana L. – Mexican prickly poppy
- Argemone munita Durand & Hilg. – flat-bud prickly poppy
- Argemone ochroleuca Sweet – pale Mexican prickly poppy
- Argemone pinnatisecta (G.B.Ownbey) S.D.Cerv. & C.D.Bailey
- Argemone platyceras Link & Otto – chicalote
- Argemone pleiacantha Greene – southwestern prickly poppy
  - Argemone pleiacantha subsp. ambigua G.B.Ownbey
  - Argemone pleiacantha subsp. pleiacantha
- Argemone polyanthemos (Fedde) G.B.Ownbey – crested prickly poppy
- Argemone sanguinea Greene – red prickly poppy
- Argemone squarrosa Greene – hedgehog prickly poppy
  - Argemone squarrosa subsp. glabrata
  - Argemone squarrosa subsp. squarrosa
- Argemone subfusiformis G.B.Ownbey

=== Formerly placed here ===
- Papaver armeniacum (L.) DC. (as A. armeniaca L.)
