= Number Six =

== Fictional characters ==
- Number Six (The Prisoner), the protagonist of the TV series The Prisoner
- Number Six (Battlestar Galactica), a Cylon model in the reimagined TV series Battlestar Galactica
- Number Six or Sayiaka Suzuki, a character from Pani Poni Dash!

== Music ==
- #6 or Shawn Crahan, American musician
- No.6 Records, a British independent record label
- No. 6 (album), 2011, by Patrik Isaksson
- No.6 Collaborations Project, a 2019 studio album by Ed Sheeran
- "Number Six" (song), a song and mini movie by Alice Nine
- "Number Six", a song by Karate from the album Unsolved

== Other uses ==
- 6, a number
- Number Six (film), a 1962 British film
- No. 6, a Japanese novel series by Atsuko Asano
- No. 6 (Violet, Green and Red), a 1951 painting by Mark Rothko
- No. 6 (Yellow, White, Blue over Yellow on Gray), a 1954 painting by Mark Rothko
- No 6 mine, an Israeli metal-cased anti-tank blast weapon
- "Number Six", a colloquialism for the Government of Gibraltar at 6 Convent Place

== See also ==
- Numbuh 6, a baby skunk appearing in the animated TV series Codename: Kids Next Door
- Six (disambiguation)
- The Six (disambiguation)
