= Seven Stars Luxury Hospitality and Lifestyle Awards =

Seven Stars Luxury Hospitality and Lifestyle Awards (Seven Star Awards)
- Awarded for: Tourist accommodation, attractions and transport
- Country: United Kingdom
- First award: 2013 (13 years ago)
- Website: Seven Star Awards

The Seven Stars Luxury Hospitality and Lifestyle Awards (abbreviated SSLHLA; also simply referred to as the Seven Star Awards) are a series of annual awards presented to international recipients in the hospitality industry. They were created by Khalil El-Mouelhy in 2013.

The awardees are selected by a panel of judges with extensive experience in the luxury hospitality and lifestyle industry. Panelists have included Ece Vahapoğlu, Nichole de Carle, and Massimiliano della Torre e Tasso (the son of Carlo Alessandro, 3rd Duke of Castel Duino).

Similar industry awards include the World Travel Awards, which El-Mouelhy was also the director of.

== Overview ==
Since 2013, the awards have been held annually at various locations in Southern Europe and Southeast Asia. Each year, there are generally about a dozen categories, over 200 winners, and approximately 1,000 nominees on average.

| Year | Location | Categories | Winners | Nominations |
|---|---|---|---|---|
| 2019 | Lake Vouliagmeni, Greece | 57 | 185 | 815 |
| 2018 | Crete, Greece | 43 | 194 | 848 |
| 2017 | Athens, Greece | 31 | 214 | 1058 |
| 2016 | Marbella, Spain | 32 | 231 | 927 |
| 2015 | Bali, Indonesia | 25 | 269 | 1413 |
| 2014 | Pahang, Malaysia | 19 | 214 | 1058 |
| 2013 | Marbella, Spain | 12 | 183 | 788 |

The Signum Virtutis, the Seal of Excellence is one of the most prestigious annual awards offered by SSLHLA, while the SSLHLA Pantheon of Hospitality is awarded to those who have received at least five Signum Virtutis awards.

== History ==
=== 2016 ===
The awards were held in Marbella, Spain. Qatar Airways won the Seven Star First Class Lounge Award and Valentine Ozigbo received the Seven Stars CEO of the Year Award. The Maharajas' Express, owned and operated by the Indian Railway Catering and Tourism Corporation (IRCTC), received the 2016 Seven Stars Luxury Hospitality and Lifestyle Awards in the Seven Star Experience Sector. Regine Sixt won the Seven Star Woman of The Year award (winning again in 2019).

=== 2017 ===
The award panelists in 2017 included Massimiliano della Torre e Tasso (the son of Carlo Alessandro, 3rd Duke of Castel Duino), Ece Vahapoğlu, and HRH Nathalie Princess of Hohenzollern. Deer Jet won the Seven Star Private Jet Company Special Award. The Luxury Award Panel members included HSH Prince Massimiliano della Torre e Tasso, Khalil El-Mouelhy, and Ece Vahapoğlu.

=== 2018 ===
Winners in 2018 came from Nigeria, Indonesia (including Bali), Fiji, Cyprus, Greece, Mauritius, Maldives, Turkey, Russia, Tanzania (including Zanzibar), South Africa, Switzerland, Italy, Germany, and Austria. Prince Massimiliano della Torre e Tasso, Baroness Nerina Keeley, Nina Lotsari, Carmen Edelson, Thanos Liontos, Amani Vernescu, photographer Oliver Jiszda, Miriam Seferian, and Andrea Luri were among the luxury panel members of the Seven Stars Luxury Hospitality and Lifestyle Awards for 2018.

Maldives won the Seven Stars Destination Award in 2018, coming ahead of Dubai, Seychelles, Mauritius, and Singapore. Maldives also won the Signum Virtutis, the Seal of Excellence, for the third time, after winning in the same category in 2013 and 2014.

Oman Air won the Best Airline in The Middle East, Africa and Europe award in 2018.

Out of the Blue, Capsis Elite Resort in Crete won the Seven Stars Luxury Hospitality and Lifestyle Awards for 2018. The resort won the Signum Virtutis for Seven Star Best Hotel & Resort in Greece for the second consecutive year, and also won the Seven Star Best Spa Services award.

Luxury Greece DMC & Travel won the Seven Stars Luxury DMC award in 2018.

=== 2019 ===
The 7th International Ceremony of Seven Stars Awards was held on October 5, 2019. Tony Elumelu won The Seven Stars Man of The Year award in 2019. Valentine Ozigbo received The Seven Stars Hospitality Personality of The Year award. Kensho Psarou won the Special Award of Lifestyle Boutique Hotel & Villas.
