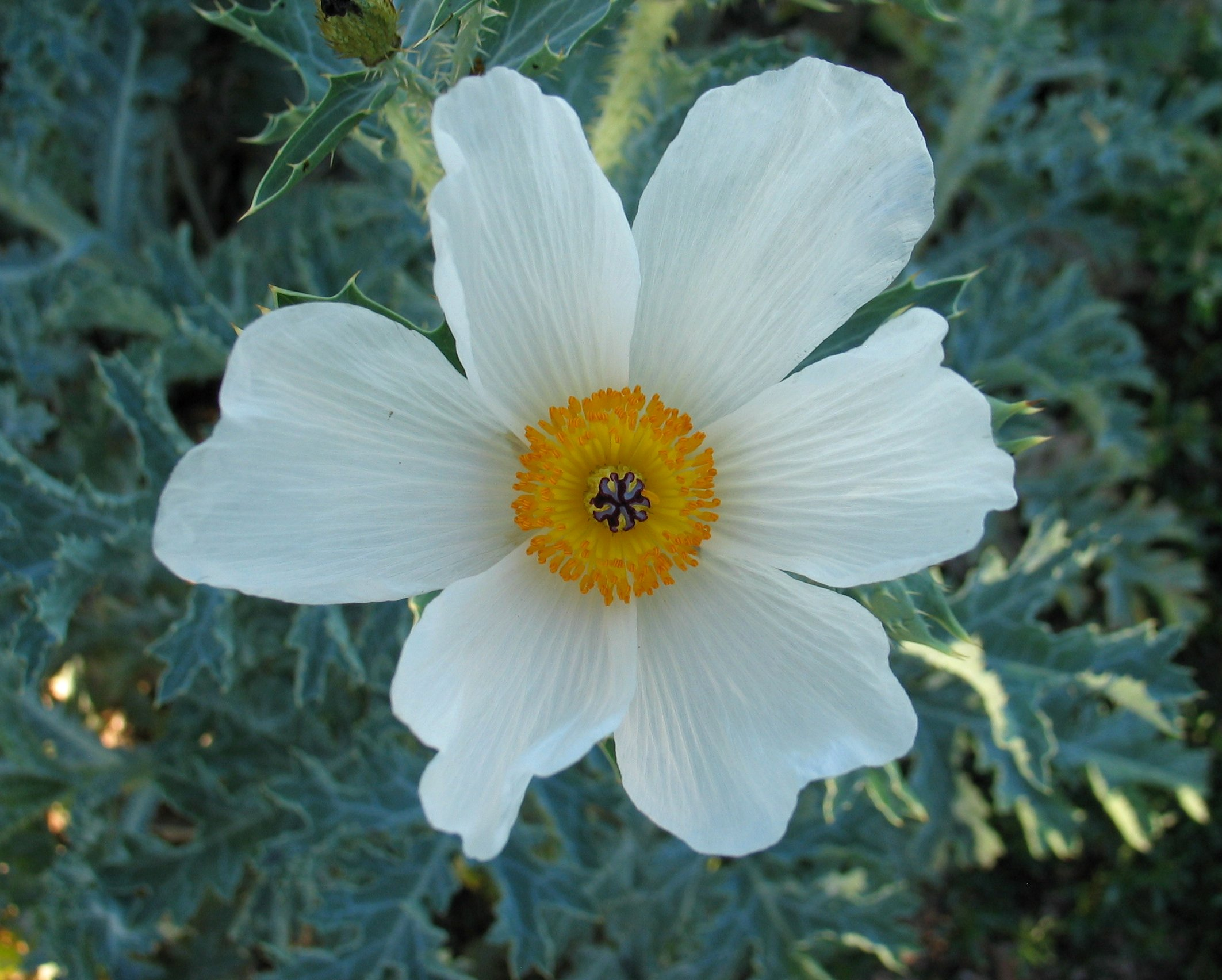
- Flower
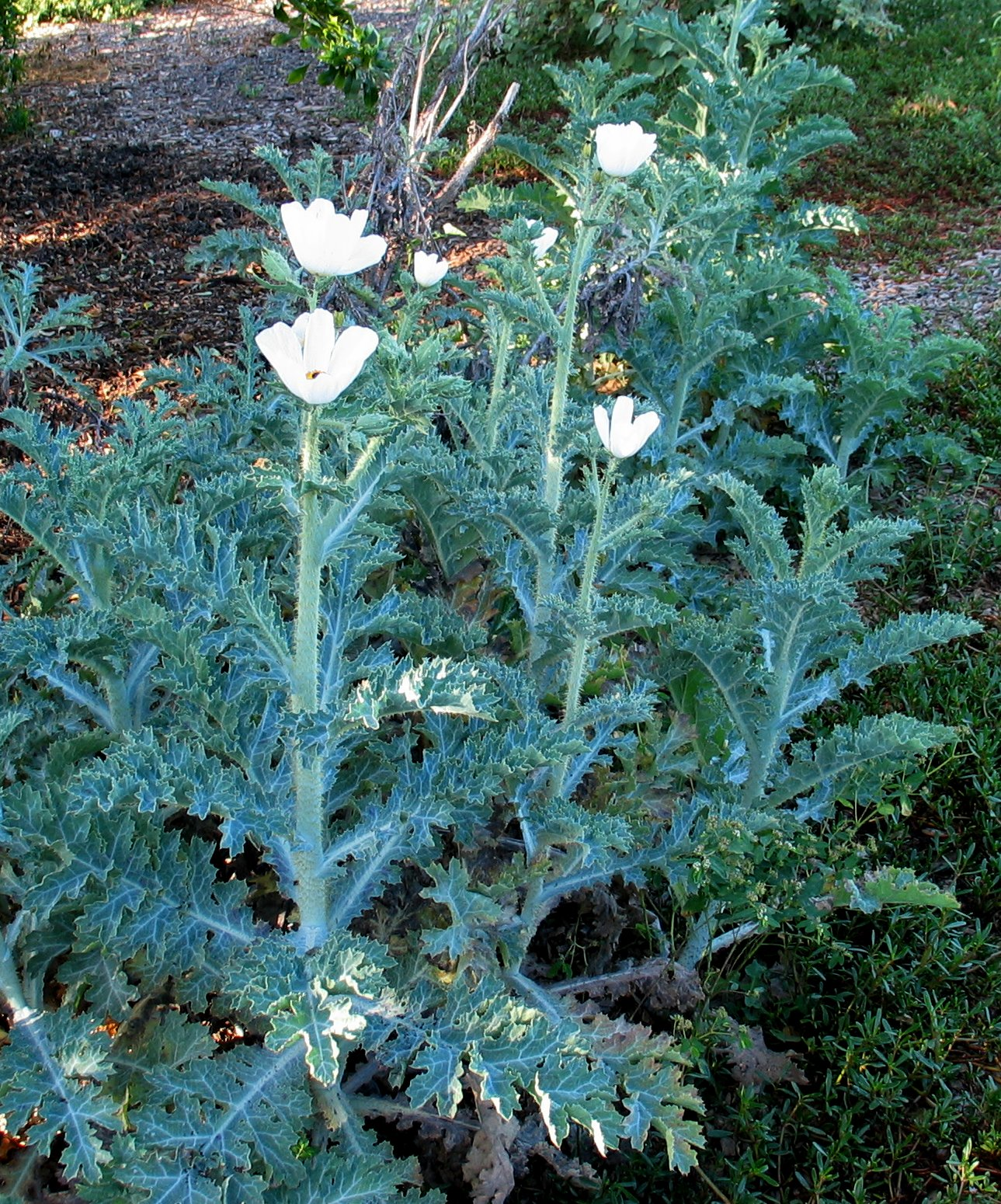
- Habit

Scientific classification
- Kingdom: Plantae
- Clade: Tracheophytes
- Clade: Angiosperms
- Clade: Eudicots
- Order: Ranunculales
- Family: Papaveraceae
- Genus: Argemone
- Species: A. glauca

Binomial name
- Argemone glauca (Nutt. ex Prain) Pope

Synonyms
- Argemone alba var. glauca Nutt. ex Prain; Argemone glauca var. decipiens G.B.Ownbey; Argemone glauca var. inermis I.Deg. & O.Deg.

= Argemone glauca =

Species of plant

Argemone glauca, the Hawaiian poppy or pua kala, is a species of flowering plant in the family Papaveraceae, native to Hawaii. A perennial, it is found in dry situations, including disturbed areas, from sea level up to 6,200 ft (1,900 m) on all of the main islands.

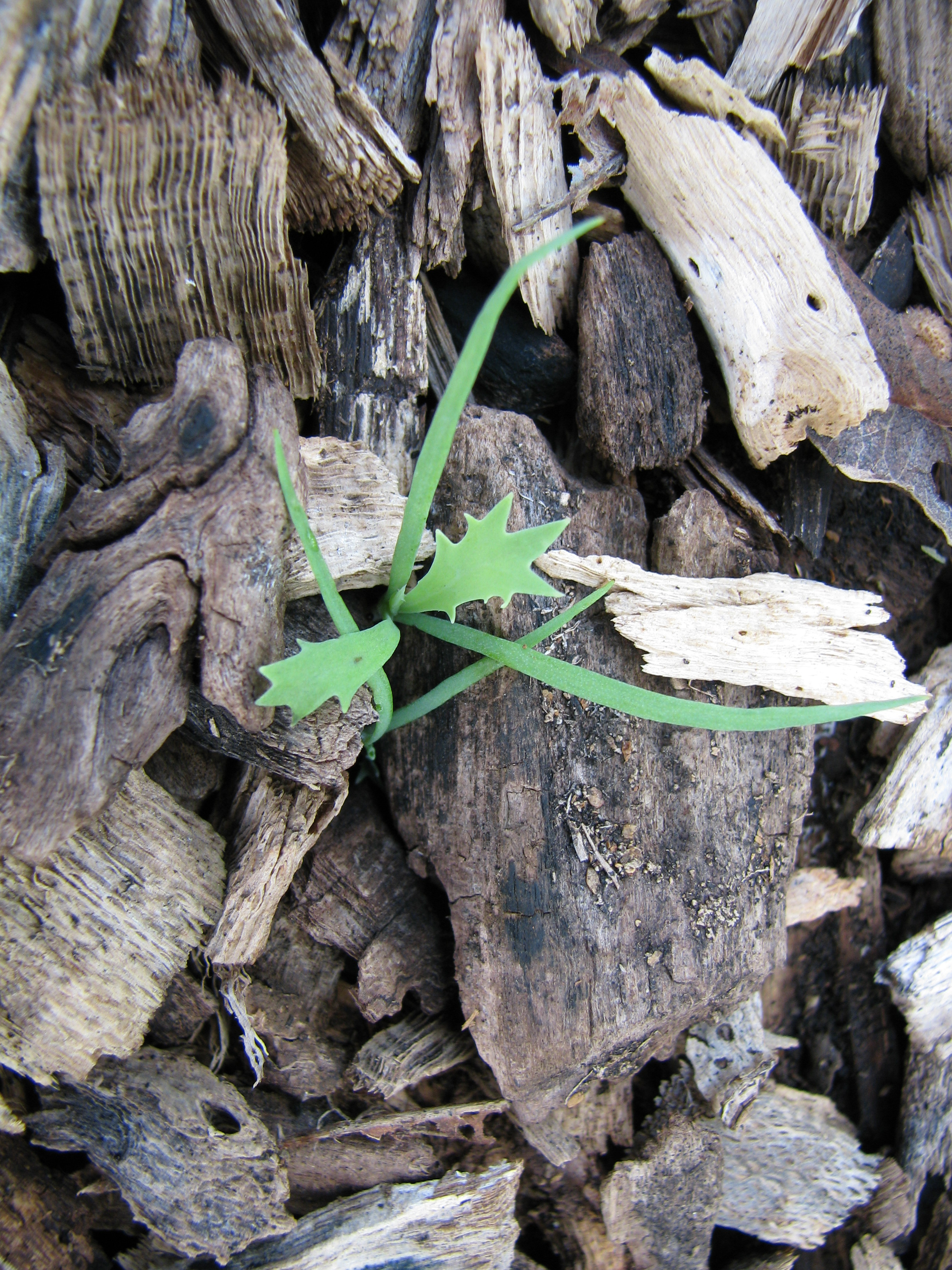
Seedling

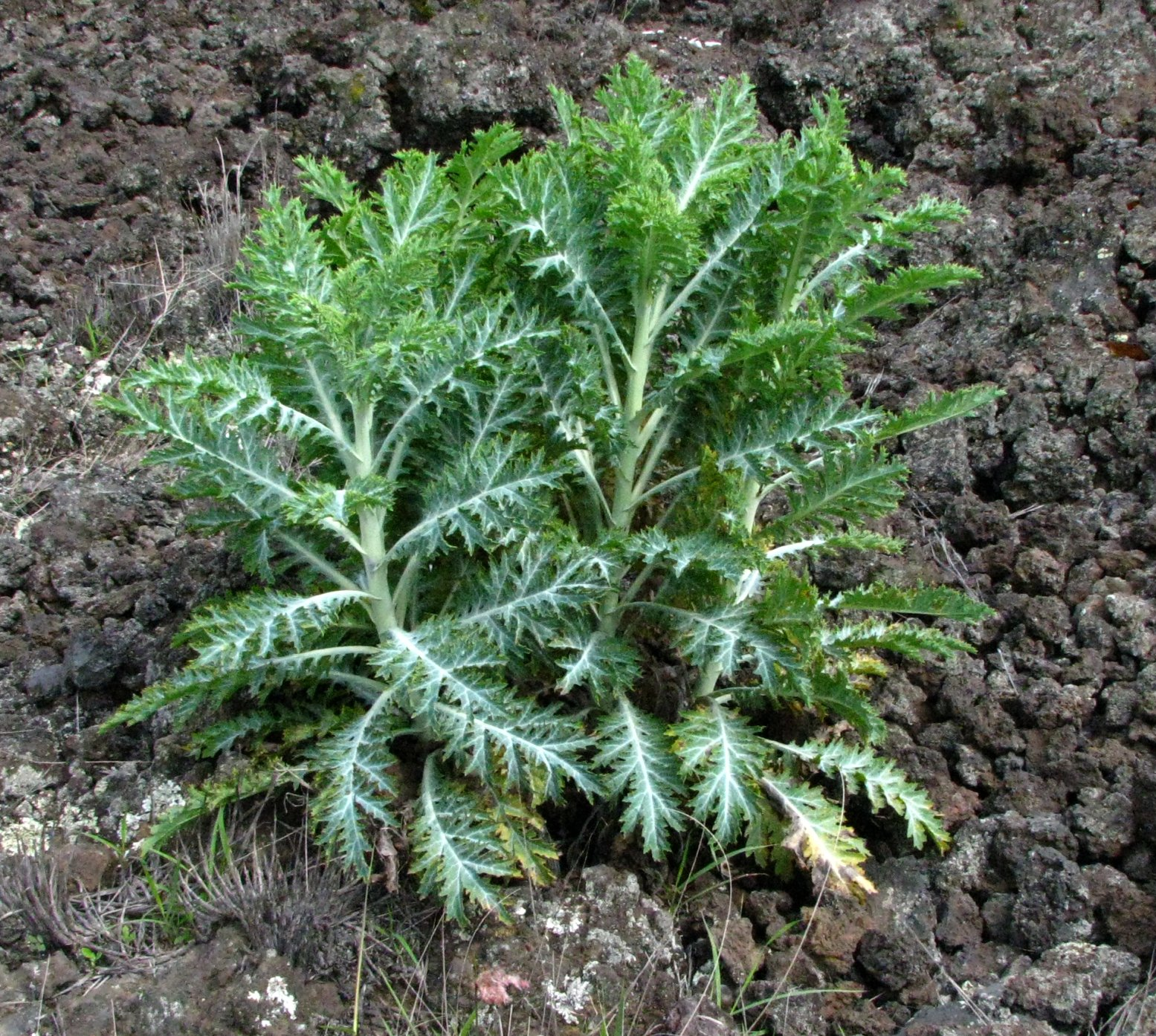
Here labeled as Argemone glauca var. decipiens

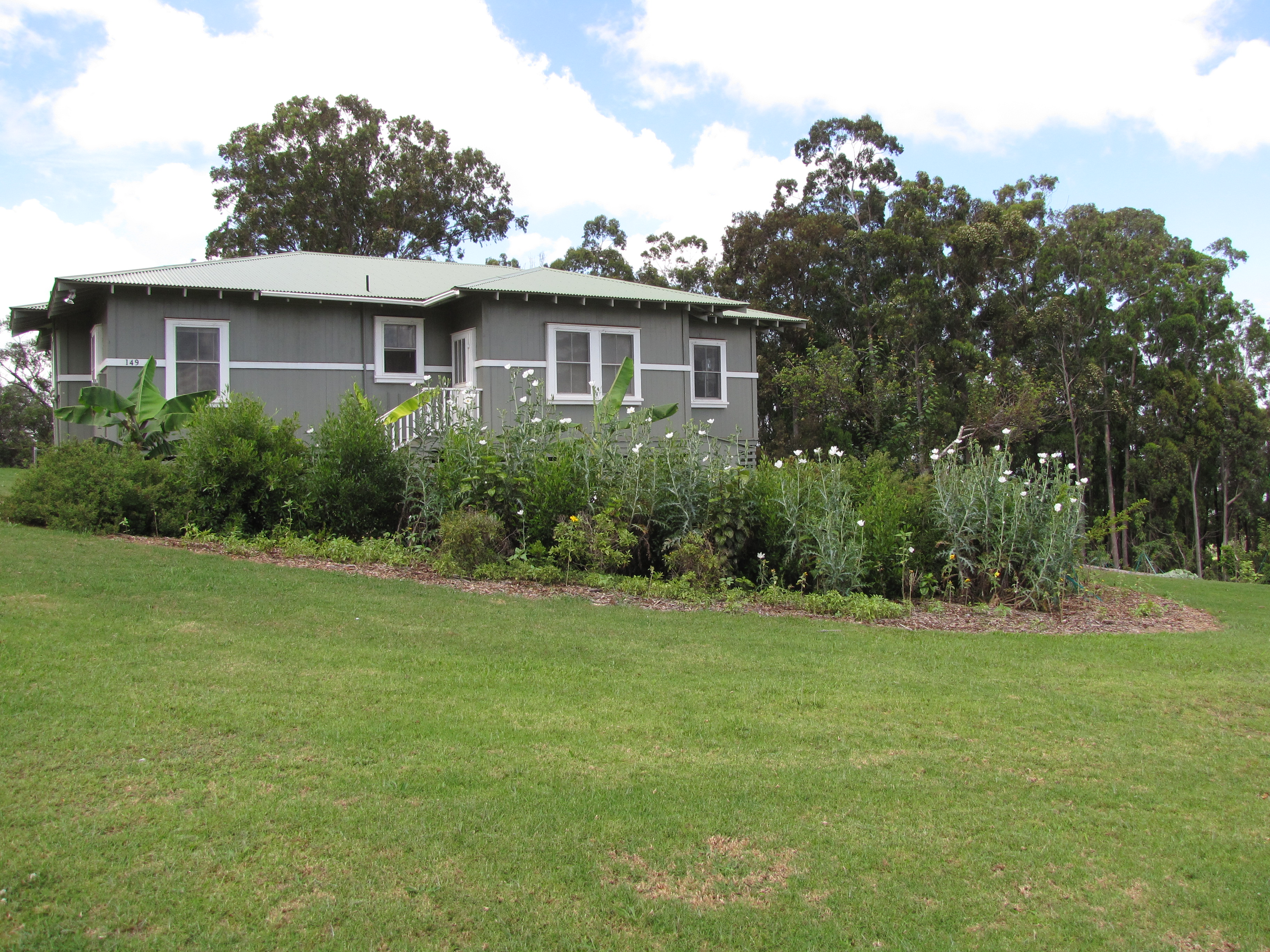
Used in landscaping

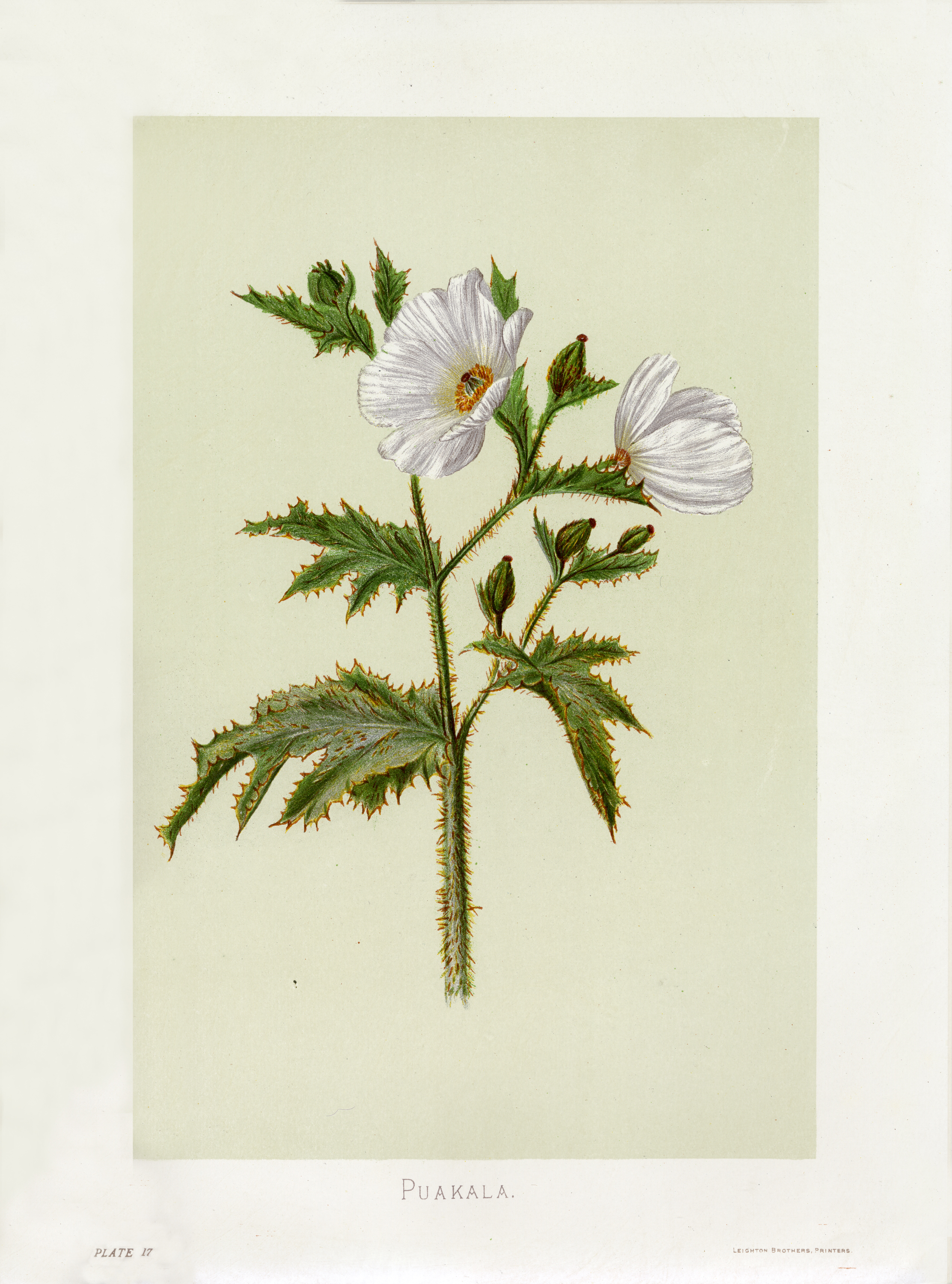
Botanical illustration
