= Sixes =

Sixes may refer to:

== Locations ==
- Sixes, Georgia
- Sixes River
- Sixes mine
- Sixes Hotel
- Sixes, Oregon

== Sports ==
- Lacrosse sixes

== See also ==
- 6 (disambiguation)
