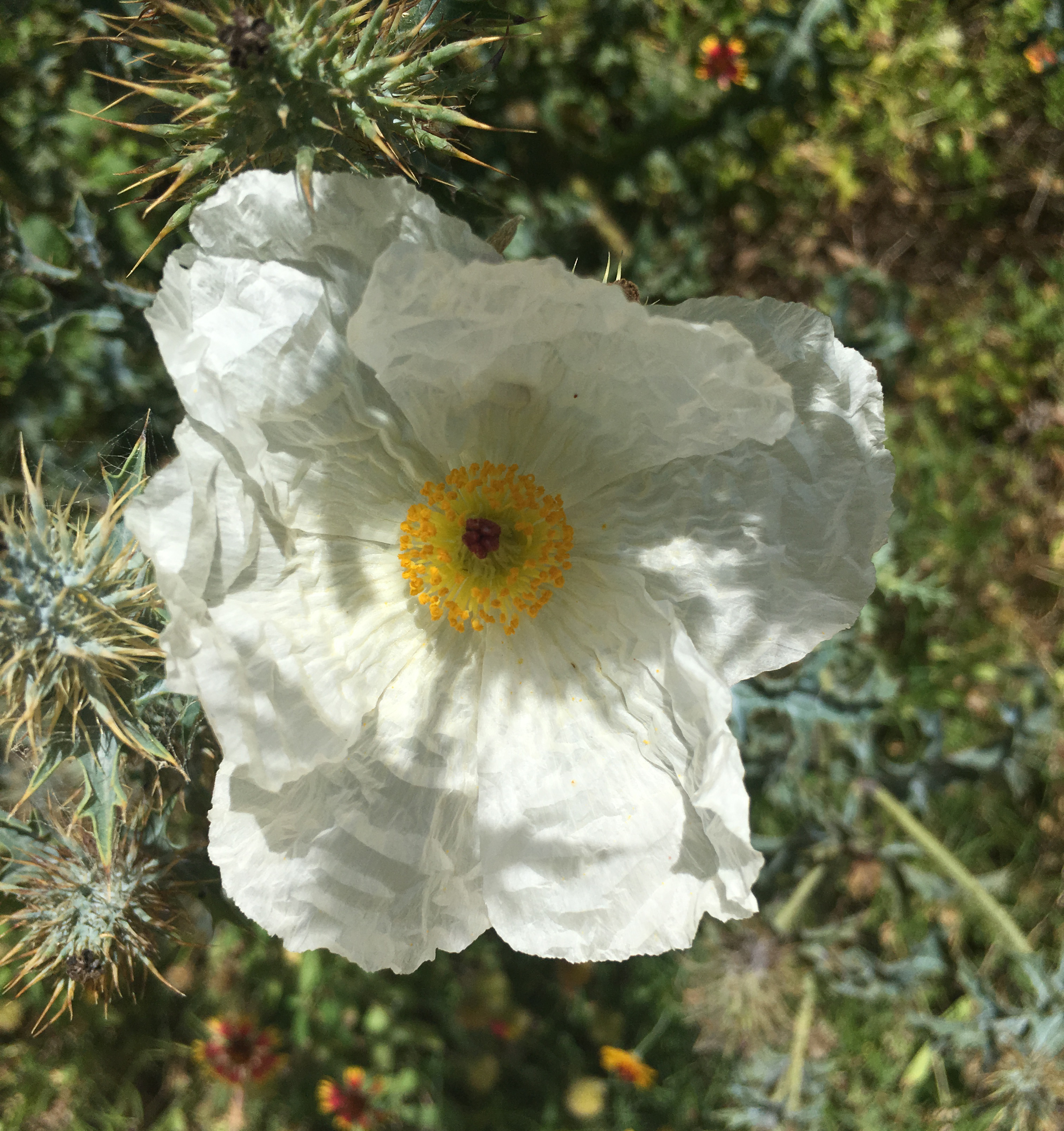
- White prickly poppy

Scientific classification
- Kingdom: Plantae
- Clade: Tracheophytes
- Clade: Angiosperms
- Clade: Eudicots
- Order: Ranunculales
- Family: Papaveraceae
- Genus: Argemone
- Species: A. albiflora

Binomial name
- Argemone albiflora Hornem

= Argemone albiflora =

Species of poppy

Argemone albiflora, the white prickly poppy, also known as the bluestem prickly poppy or the Texas prickly poppy, is a small erect plant with a decorative white flower with a yellow latex. It is deeply rooted with yellow or red stamens. The plant is known for the sharp prickles on its stem and leaves. The sepals fall off as the flower of this plant grows bigger. It grows in the arid regions of the southern Midwest along roadsides and disturbed pieces of land. Native Americans have long revered this plant for its medicinal and other uses.

== Distribution ==
Argemone albiflora can be found in the area ranging from east Texas to northern Arkansas and southern Missouri. Native to areas of Southern California's High Desert such as Twentynine Palms.

== Habitat and ecology ==
White prickly poppy is an annual or biennial plant that often grows in colonies in sandy or gravelly soils. This plant is often found along fences, roadsides, railroad tracks, on hills and slopes, and in overgrazed pastures.

== Morphology ==
Individuals of this species are erect, prickly deep-rooted plants with a white flower that contains many yellow and red stamens. The flowers grow solitarily or in loose cymes at the top of the plant. It contains grayish-green, long (2 to 10 inches) lanceolate to ovate leaves. The lower leaves are lobed to the midrib while the upper leaves are more shallow. The upper surface of the leaf is smooth although it has a few prickles along the midrib while the lower surface of the leaf is spiny along the midrib and main vein.

== Flowers and fruit ==
Flowers of A. albiflora contain three long sepals and six petals and are ovate to almost circular with a rugged outer margin. The ovary is single chambered and contains many ovules with three- to five-lobed purple stigma. The fruit of this plant is a spiny capsule opening by the terminal splits. The seeds are brownish black.

== Chemical ==
- Argemonine N-CH3
- Allocryptopine Protopine Cryptopine Californidine - similar and others found in Papaveraceae

== Usage ==
The oil of the white prickly poppy was used as a fine lubricant during WWII. It was found that the oil content of the seed is 25.8% which is similar to the oil content found in soybeans. The white prickly poppy is also used for decorative and ornamental purposes.

=== Food ===
This plant is usually avoided by cattle and many other animals that roam the southern Midwest area as it is very prickly and has limited nutritional value. The seeds are the most nutritional part of the plant. Quails and doves consume these seeds for its high oil content. Each flower produces an abundance of seeds making it a reliable food source.

=== Medicinal ===
The white prickly poppy exudes a yellow latex that Native Americans use for many different ailments. Aztec priests would use the plant in sacrificial rituals. The Comanches held the plant in such high regard that they would make offerings to it during harvesting. They would take the latex and use it to remove warts, treat cold sores and other skin problems. A concoction could also be made from the flower to treat congestion from the cold or the flu. The seeds can also be used as an emetic to induce vomiting or as a laxative or even as a mild sedative. The entire plant can also be used to treat bladder infection, prostate pain, or to help the throbbing pain of a migraine. A wash made from the tea can also be used to help heal sunburns or scraped skin. The plant is also smoked during some important ceremonies to induce a euphoric and mild sedating effect. However, if not used properly, the plant can be very toxic.
