= Ece Vahapoğlu =

Turkish journalist (born 1978)

- Born: March 8, 1978 (age 48)
- Education: The American University of Rome
- Occupations: Journalist, autor, television host

Ece Vahapoğlu (born 8 March 1978, in Istanbul) is a Turkish author, television host, and journalist.

== Early life ==
Vahapoğlu was born in Istanbul to a Turkish father, Mehmet Vahapoğlu, and a Bosnian mother Jasmina Muratović. Her great-grandmother's uncle was an Ottoman Pasha.

Raised in Istanbul, she started her university education on Vesalius College in Brussels. Then after having a one semester exchange program in Spain, she graduated from The American University of Rome in 2000 in Business Administration. She had her master's degree in France, IEHEI on "EU and International Relations".

== Career ==
She is a prominent Turkish media personality with her own TV shows and best-seller books. Being one of Turkey's best-known broadcasters, she began her television career with NTV and CNBC-e in Istanbul, before spreading her wings with shows on SkyTurk TV, Atv and CINE5.

She has acted as a TV presenter and master of ceremonies for many international events, both for private and public sector, including Mediterranean Games, Formula One, FIA, UEFA, World Travel Awards, Asian Racing Conference, European Quality Summit, European Business Awards, Seven Stars Luxury Hospitality and Lifestyle Awards, and many events of the Ministries of Turkey.

Ece is also a role model for sports and health, a certified wellness trainer and is a spokesperson for the Sports for All Federation of Turkey.

She presented Istanbul Film in English supported by the Ministry of Culture and Tourism of Turkey.

== Books ==
- Yabancı Dil Öğrenme Yolları (2002)
- Bugün Zengin Ol (2004)
- Ece'nin VIP Konukları (2004)
- Öteki (2009)
- 60 Günde İdeal Vücut (2012)
- 60 Günde İdeal Mutfak (2012)
