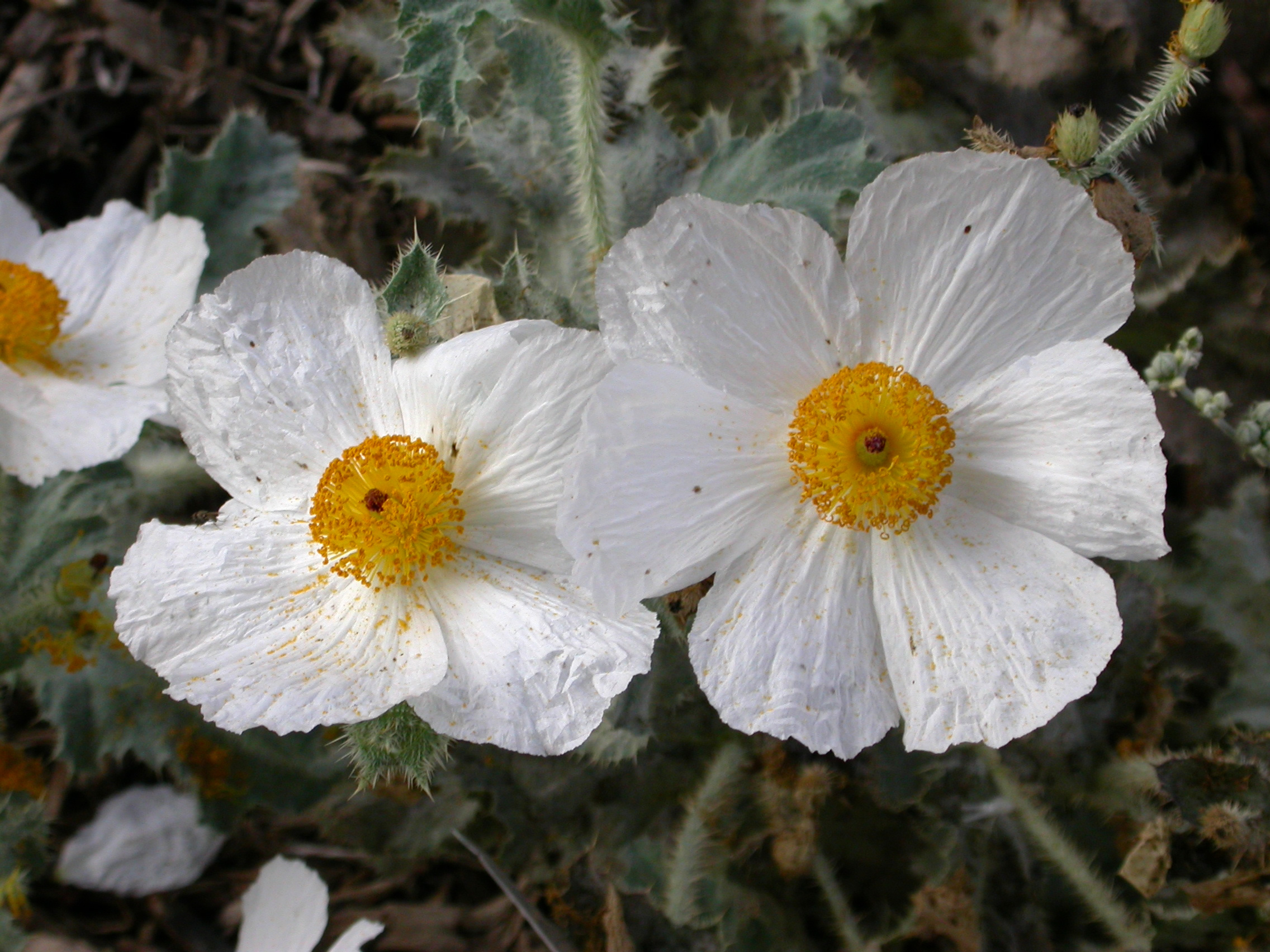

Conservation status
- Vulnerable (NatureServe)

Scientific classification
- Kingdom: Plantae
- Clade: Embryophytes
- Clade: Tracheophytes
- Clade: Spermatophytes
- Clade: Angiosperms
- Clade: Eudicots
- Order: Ranunculales
- Family: Papaveraceae
- Genus: Argemone
- Species: A. corymbosa

Binomial name
- Argemone corymbosa Greene

Subspecies
- A. c. subsp. arenicola; A. c. subsp. corymbosa

Synonyms
- Argemone arenicola

= Argemone corymbosa =

Plant species in the poppy family

Argemone corymbosa, the Mojave prickly poppy, is a flowering plant in the family Papaveraceae native to the eastern Mojave Desert of the southwestern United States. It especially common around Cima, California and the nearby community of Kelso, California. The plant grows in sandy places and on dry slopes, and is very similar to desert prickly poppy.

== Description ==
It is a perennial herbaceous plant growing to 20–80 centimeters tall, with distinctive orange latex in the stems. The leaves are 8–15 cm long, with prickly margins. The flowers are 4–8 cm diameter, with four white petals and an orange-colored center.

== Taxonomy ==
Argemone corymbosa was scientifically described and named in 1886 by Edward Lee Greene. It is classified in the genus Argemone within the family Papaveraceae. It has two accepted subspecies.

- Argemone corymbosa subsp. arenicola
  This subspecies was described and named by Gerald Bruce Ownbey in 1958. It grows in northwestern Arizona and southwestern Utah
- Argemone corymbosa subsp. corymbosa
  The autonymic subspecies grows in southeastern California and western Arizona

There are two homotypic synonyms of both Argemone corymbosa and subspecies arenicola.

Table of Synonyms
Name	Year	Rank	Synonym of:
Argemone arenicola (G.B.Ownbey) S.L.Welsh	2015	species	subsp. arenicola
Argemone corymbosa var. arenicola (G.B.Ownbey) Shinners	1959	variety	subsp. arenicola
Argemone intermedia subsp. corymbosa (Greene) A.E.Murray	1982	subspecies	A. corymbosa
Argemone intermedia var. corymbosa (Greene) Eastw.	1896	variety	A. corymbosa
