= The Six =

The Six may refer to:

== Music ==
- Les Six, a group of six French composers working in Montparnasse in the early 20th century
- The Six, a 2019 EP by Fanatics

== Television ==
- The 6 (news programme), a local TV news programme in Bristol, England
- SC6 (sports program) or The Six, an expanded edition of the ESPN show SportsCenter
- The Six, original title of the U.S. version of the Russian game show What? Where? When?, renamed to Million Dollar Mind Game
- The Six (EastEnders), storyline in British soap opera EastEnders

== Other uses ==
- The Six (film), 2021 documentary about Chinese survivors of the Titanic (六人-泰坦尼克上的中国幸存者)
- "The Six", or "The 6ix", a nickname for Toronto coined by Jimmy Prime
  - The Toronto Six, a professional sports team in the National Women's Hockey League (NWHL); team nickname inspired by the city's nickname
- The Six, a fictional team of six mutants in the Mutant X comic book series
- The Six, a fictional team of mutants affiliated with Marvel Comic's S.W.O.R.D
- Inner Six or The Six, the founding members of the European Communities
- 6 (New York City Subway service)
- The Six, a US Air Force nickname for the F-106 Delta Dart supersonic interceptor in service from 1956 to 1988
- Northern Ireland, which makes up six of the counties of Ireland.

== See also ==
- 6 (disambiguation)
- 6ix (disambiguation)
- Number Six (disambiguation)
- The Black Six, a 1974 American film
