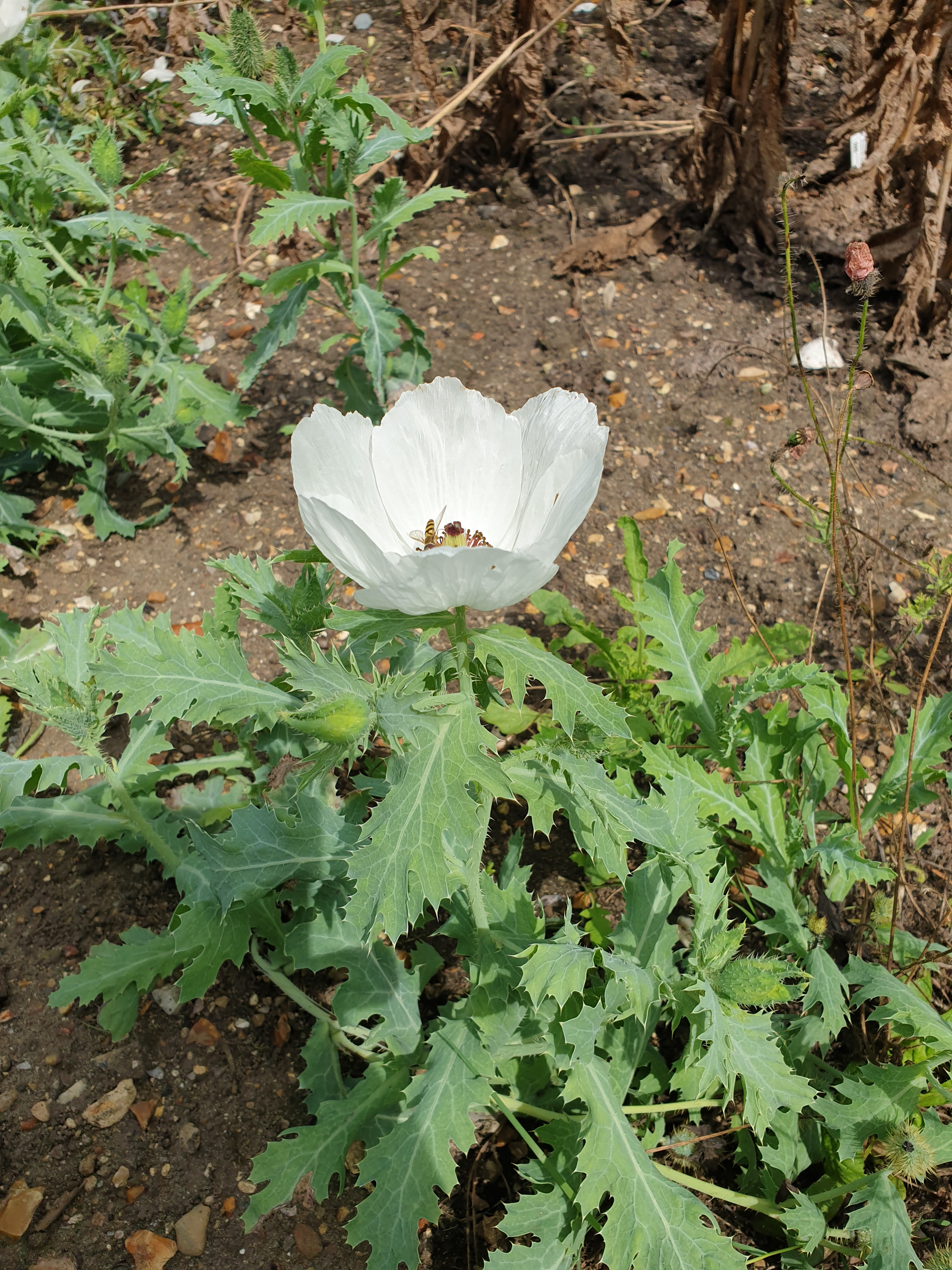
- Habit
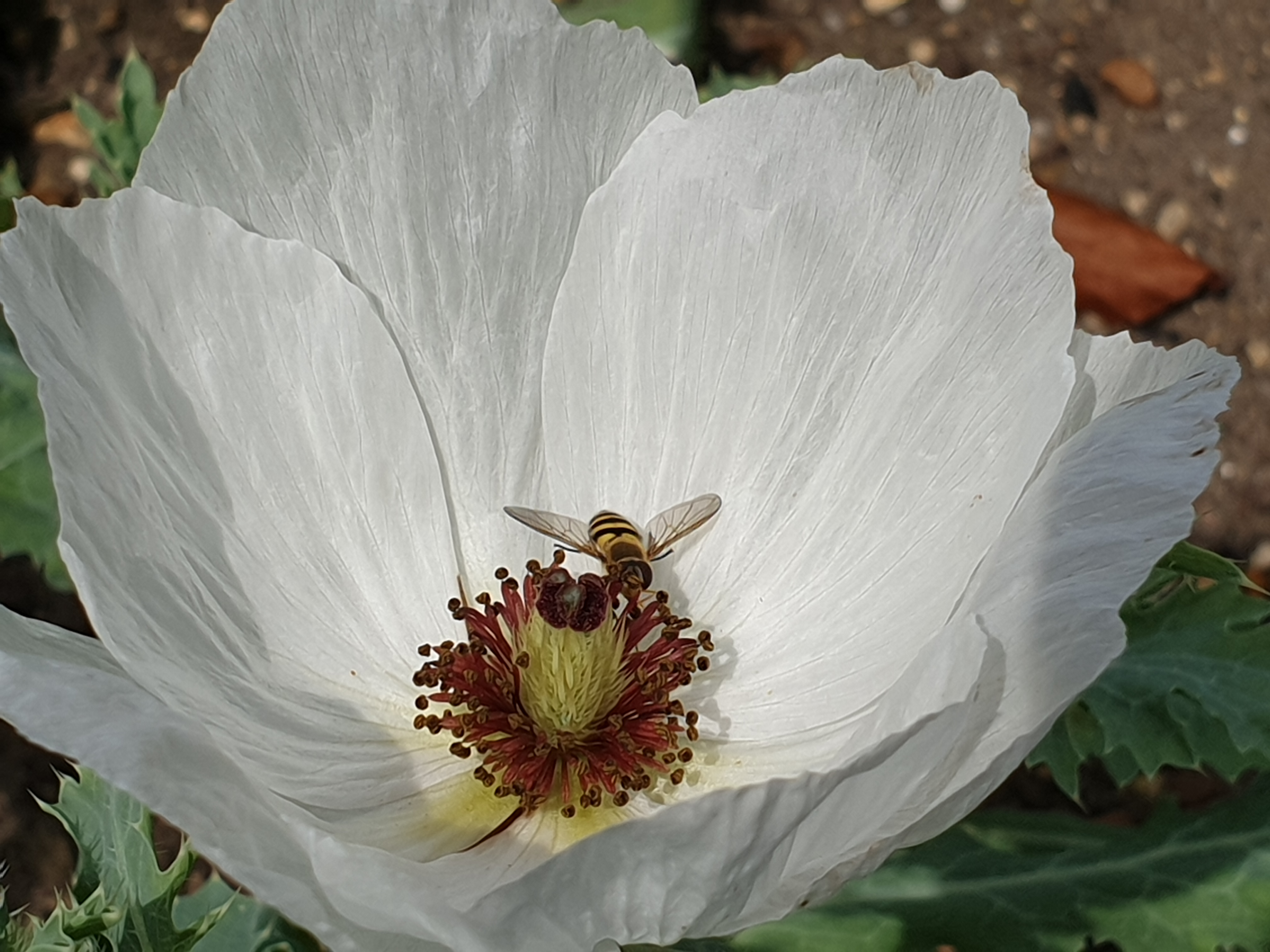
- Close-up of flower

Scientific classification
- Kingdom: Plantae
- Clade: Tracheophytes
- Clade: Angiosperms
- Clade: Eudicots
- Order: Ranunculales
- Family: Papaveraceae
- Genus: Argemone
- Species: A. platyceras

Binomial name
- Argemone platyceras Link & Otto

Synonyms
- Argemone mexicana var. aculeatissima Moric. ex Prain

= Argemone platyceras =

Species of plant

Argemone platyceras, the chicalote, is a species of flowering plant in the family Papaveraceae. It is native to seasonally dry areas of Mexico, and has been introduced to Uzbekistan. There appears to be a cultivar, 'Silver Charm'.

A number of alkaloids are present in Argemone platyceras, e.g. the pavine platycerine.
