= No. 6 (Yellow, White, Blue over Yellow on Gray) =

1954 painting by Mark Rothko

- Artist: Mark Rothko
- Year: 1949
- Medium: Oil on canvas
- Dimensions: 240 cm × 151.8 cm (94 in × 59.8 in)
- Owner: Private collection

No. 6 (Yellow, White, Blue over Yellow on Gray) is a 1954 oil on canvas painting in a color field style by Latvian-born American artist Mark Rothko created in 1954. After his experiments with mythological themes and Surrealism to express tragedy he turned to depicting irregular and painterly rectangular regions of color.

== Description ==
The painting depicts three blurred blocks of yellow, white and blue opposed against a gray ground. He made the various layers of the painting dry quickly, without mixing of colors, so that he could soon create new layers on top of the earlier ones. No. 6 (Yellow, White, Blue over Yellow on Gray) belongs to Rothko’s late period when he for seven years painted in oil only on large canvases with vertical formats. Very large-scale designs were used, in Rothko's words, to make the viewer feel "enveloped within" the painting.
