= List of highways numbered 6N =

The following highways are numbered 6N:

== United States ==
- U.S. Route 6N
  - U.S. Route 6N (New York) (former)
  - U.S. Route 6N (Pennsylvania) (former)
- New York State Route 6N
