= Argemone pinnatisecta =

Scientific classification
- Kingdom: Plantae
- Clade: Embryophytes
- Clade: Tracheophytes
- Clade: Spermatophytes
- Clade: Angiosperms
- Clade: Eudicots
- Order: Ranunculales
- Family: Papaveraceae
- Genus: Argemone
- Species: A. pinnatisecta

Binomial name
- Argemone pinnatisecta (G.B.Ownbey) S.D.Cerv. & C.D.Bailey

Species of flowering plant

Argemone pinnatisecta, known as the Sacramento prickly poppy, is an angiosperm and part of the poppy family. A very thorny looking perennial that grows up to a meter and a half in height. The thorny stems are covered in bluish green serrated leaves with spiky tips. The flower buds are also covered in these sharp thin thorns until they open, between May and August, revealing six white petals up to four centimetres (1.6 in) long and nine centimetres (3.5 in) wide, and a bright yellow anther with various stamens jetting out. The fruits of plant contain black seeds about two millimeters in diameter.

== Distribution ==
Argemone pinnatisecta only occurs in Otero County, New Mexico. It has only been found among ten canyons in this region of the Sacramento Mountains.

== Habitat and ecology ==
Argemone pinnatisecta is a perennial that only grows on the slopes and bottoms of canyons, and alongside the roads near the bottom of these canyons. This species of plant enjoys newly disturbed soils that are very loose containing much gravel at land heights between 4,200 and 7,100 feet (1,280 and 2,160 m) above sea-level. In January the temperatures in the valleys are around 50 degrees Fahrenheit and higher elevations roughly around 30 degrees Fahrenheit, and during the summer months the temperatures can exceed 100 degrees Fahrenheit. Precipitation can range from 10 to 20 inches (250 to 510 mm) of rainfall on average annually.

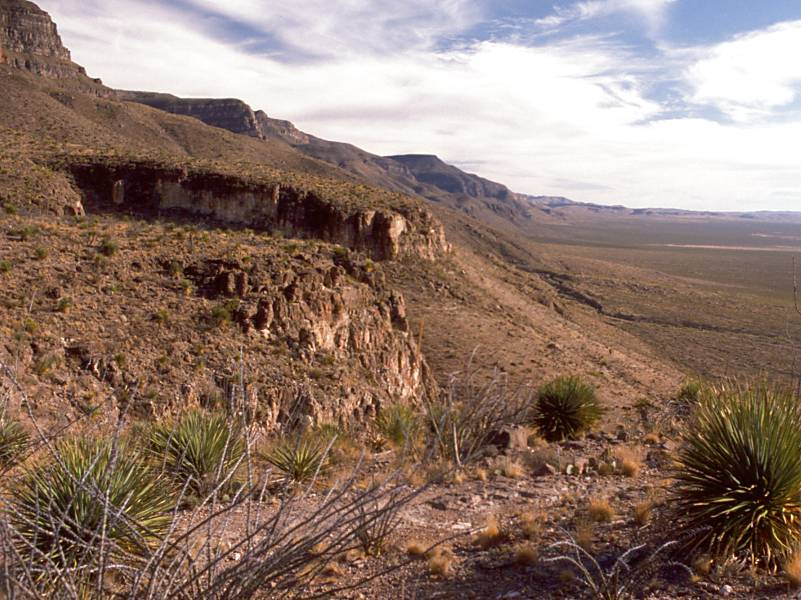
A view of a typical Sacramento Mountain terrain

== Morphology, flowers and fruit ==
Individuals of this species are thorny herbaceous plant with many stems covered in serrated leaves and thorny buds and flowers. The plant has sinuses that are square and broad, its veins and margins are armored in thin spiky thorns. Argemone pinnatisecta has two to three sepals, six white petals, various stamens and bright yellow anthers. This plant flowers between May and August after which it fruits, each fruit is covered in prickles encapsulating approximately 2mm diameter black seeds.

== Conservation status ==
Argemone pinnatisecta in the 1980s numbered about 1300 individuals, however it has declined in recent years for unknown reasons. This plant appears to be a secondary successional species that has been found in old un-maintained fields and alongside roadsides of areas where a past disturbance has occurred, this makes the plants appearance very episodic and less common. It has made the federal U.S. Endangered Species List.
