= Regine Sixt =

German businessperson

Regine Sixt is a German businessperson and currently Senior Executive Vice President of Sixt International, an international car rental and leasing business.

== Career ==
After studying in Germany, England and France, she met her future husband, Erich Sixt, chief executive officer and chairman of the board of Sixt AG, and started her career at Sixt, developing international partnerships with airlines, hotel and travel chains around the globe. She is Head of International Marketing including CI and PR. She has played a leading role in the expansion of Sixt into 105 countries with 4,000 locations worldwide, offering 225,000 cars both to business and leisure clienteles.

== Sixt ==
Sixt was founded in 1912 and even though it went public in 1986, it still is family-run in the fourth generation. The sons of Erich and Regine Sixt, Alexander and Konstantin, are both in leading positions in the Sixt Group.

== Philanthropy ==
Regine Sixt is the chief executive officer of the Regine Sixt Children’s Aid Foundation "Drying little tears" which she founded in 2000. For her continuous engagement for Israel - among many others - she recently was awarded with the "Citizen of the World Award” of Hadassah in Jerusalem.

== Awards ==
In 2016 and 2019, Regine Sixt won the Seven Stars Luxury Hospitality and Lifestyle Awards Woman of The Year award.
