= Six, West Virginia =

Six
- Unincorporated community
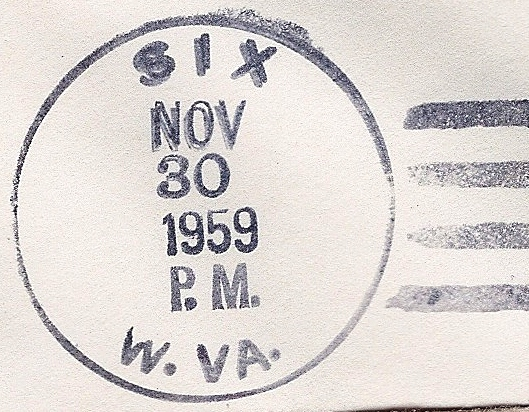
- Postmark from Six, West Virginia

- Location within West Virginia Six (the United States)
- Coordinates: 37°22′08″N 81°38′16″W
- Country: United States
- State: West Virginia
- County: McDowell
- Elevation: 1,552 ft (473 m)
- Time zone: UTC-5 (Eastern (EST))
  - Summer (DST): UTC-4 (EDT)
- Area codes: 304 & 681
- GNIS feature ID: 1546846

Six is an unincorporated community in McDowell County, West Virginia, United States. Six is located on West Virginia Route 16, 5 miles (8.0 km) southwest of Welch.

The community took its name from Mine Number 6, a nearby coal mine.

== See also ==
- List of places with numeric names
