= Six Lake =

Lake in the state of Minnesota, United States

- Location within Minnesota
- Location: Becker and Otter Tail County, Minnesota
- Coordinates: 46°42′37″N 95°46′43″W
- Type: lake

Six Lake is a lake in Becker and Otter Tail counties, in the U.S. state of Minnesota.

Six Lake was so named for its location in "section six" of Otter Tail County.

== See also ==
- List of lakes in Minnesota
