= Oración Seis =

Oracion Seis or Oracion Six (Japanese: 六祈将軍(オラシオンセイス), Hepburn: Orashion Seisu, Spanish: Oración Seis) lit. 'Prayer Six' may refer to:

- Oracion Seis (Rave Master), group in anime and manga series Rave Master
- Oracion Seis (Fairy Tail), group in anime and manga series Fairy Tail
  - Reborn Oracion Seis, successor of the group appears only in anime
- Oracion Seis (Farmagia), group in video game and anime adaptation Farmagia

== See also ==
- Sinister Six, group of supervillains in Marvel Comics
