= Slovak Internet eXchange =

Internet exchange point in Slovakia

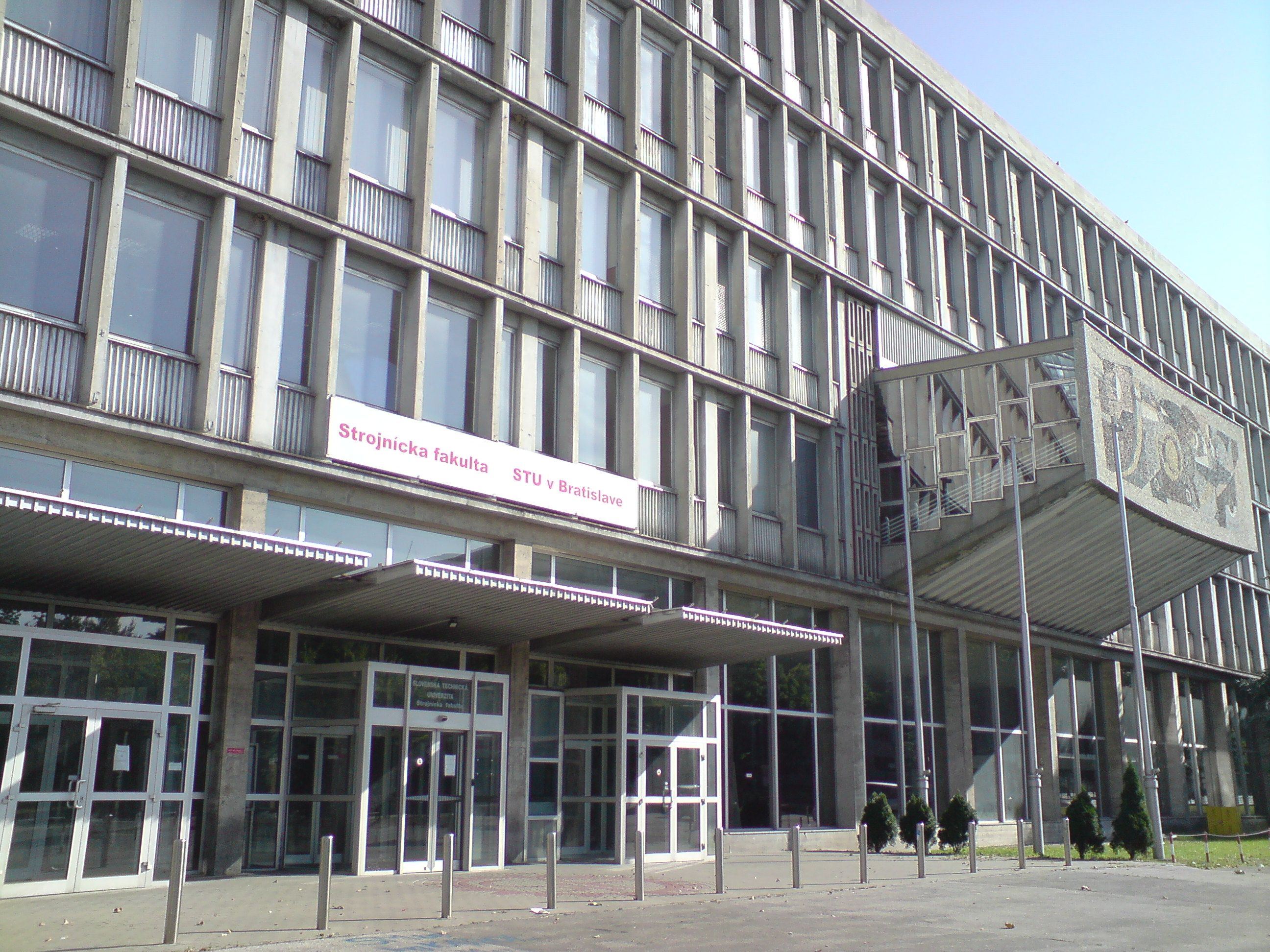
- Full name: Slovak Internet eXchange
- Abbreviation: SIX
- Founded: 1996
- Location: Bratislava and Košice, Slovakia
- Website: www.six.sk
- Peers: 70 as of February 2026
- Peak: 1383 Gbit/s as of October 2026

The Slovak Internet eXchange (SIX) is a Slovak internet exchange point, established at the Center of Computer Technology of Slovak University of Technology (STU). As of February 2026, the SIX interconnects 70 ISPs operating in the Slovak Republic, and has a peak traffic rate of 1225 Gbit/s, making it the most significant exchange point in Slovakia.

== Information ==
- Location: Bratislava, Slovakia
- Interconnection points: 2
- Connected ISPs : 70
- Peak data transmission: 1383 Gbit/s
- Founded: 1996

Development of annual aggregated data flow peaks (Gbps):

== See also ==
- List of Internet exchange points by size
