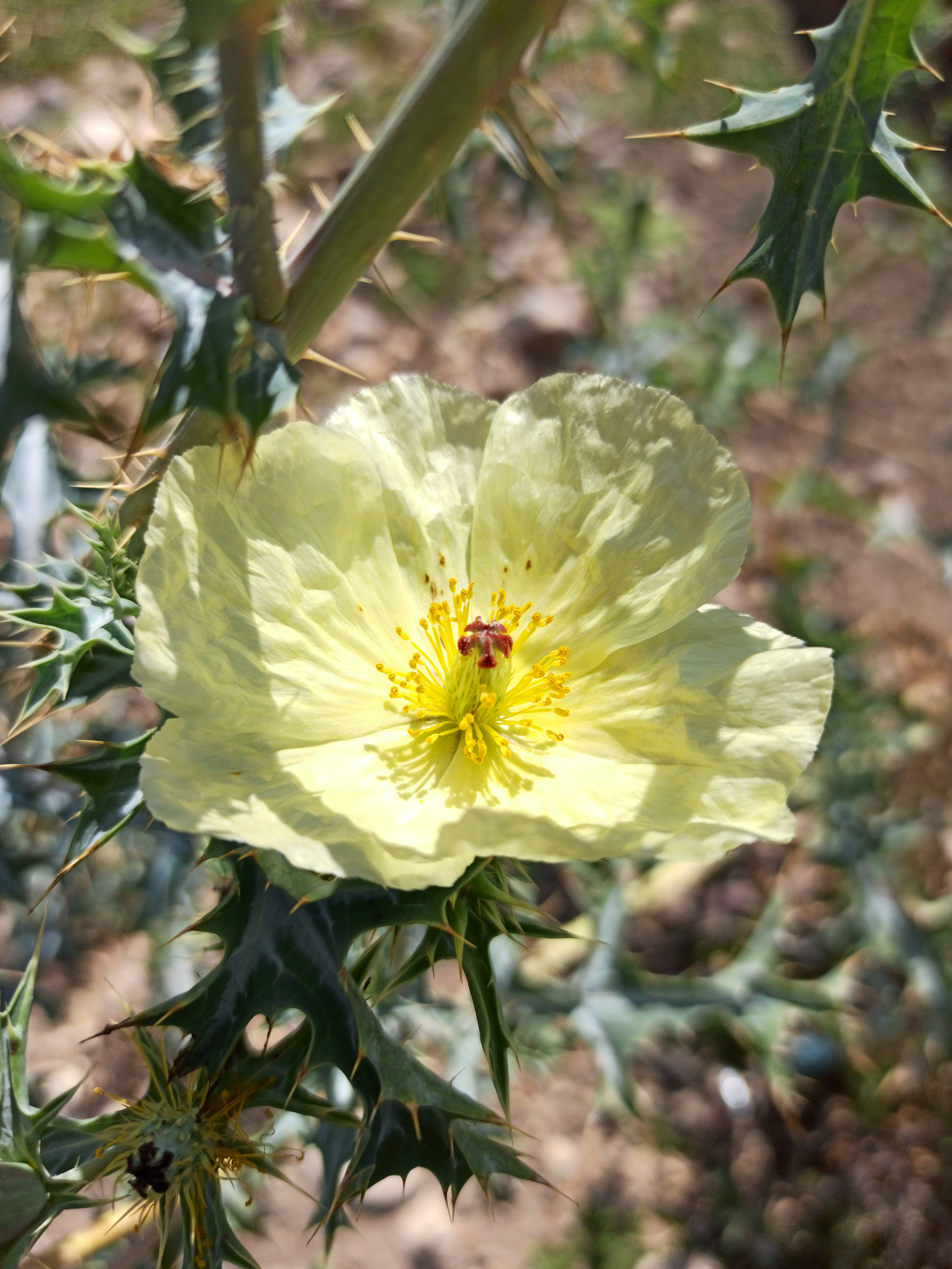

Scientific classification
- Kingdom: Plantae
- Clade: Tracheophytes
- Clade: Angiosperms
- Clade: Eudicots
- Order: Ranunculales
- Family: Papaveraceae
- Genus: Argemone
- Species: A. ochroleuca

Binomial name
- Argemone ochroleuca Sweet

Synonyms
- Argemone barclayana Penny; Argemone intermedia Sweet; Argemone mexicana var. alba DC; Argemone mexicana subsp. ochroleuca L.; Argemone stenopetala Rose; Argemone sulphurea Sweet

= Argemone ochroleuca =

Species of flowering plant

Argemone ochroleuca is a species of prickly poppy, a flowering plant commonly known as pale Mexican prickly poppy or Mexican poppy. It is native to Mexico and is also an introduced weed in many temperate and tropical regions of the world. It can grow up to 1 m (3 ft 3 in) in height and has a sticky yellow sap.

== As an introduced species ==
It can be found as an introduced species in Western Australia, New Zealand, the Arabian Peninsula, Iran, the Indian subcontinent, South Africa, and Arizona in the southwestern United States. It has become invasive in Australia, Africa, tropical Asia, New Zealand and a number of oceanic islands. Since Argemone ochroleuca produces a large number of seeds, it can accidentally be introduced into new areas as a seed contaminant. It is often a problem in agricultural land, but also has the potential to outcompete native species and decrease biodiversity. It is also toxic to humans and livestock.
