= SIC =

Sic, as the label "[sic]" found immediately following a copy of text, indicates that a use that may seem erroneous is in fact transcribed faithfully.

Sic, SIC, etc., also may refer to:

== Arts, media, and entertainment ==
- Sic (band), styled as SIC, a metal band from the Faroe Islands
- (sic) (band), a 1990s rock band formed in Ireland by Ricky Warwick
- sic (experimental musician), styled as [sic], stage name of Jennifer Morris, a Canadian noise artist
- "(sic)", a song by American metal band Slipknot on the 1999 album Slipknot
- SIC (magazine) (Sons Idées Couleurs), 1916–1919 arts magazine edited by Pierre Albert-Birot
- [Sic] (album), a 2005 jazz/fusion album by Austrian guitarist Alex Machacek
- S.I.C. (Krizz Kaliko EP), 2011

== Organizations ==
- Shetland Islands Council, the local authority serving Shetland, Scotland, from 1975 to the present
  - SIC Ferries, a council-owned company operating inter-island ferry services in Shetland
- SIC Insurance Company, a Ghanaian insurance company
- Sociedade Independente de Comunicação, a Portuguese television network and media company that owns the following channels:
  - SIC Caras
  - SIC Internacional
  - SIC K
  - SIC Mulher
  - SIC Notícias
  - SIC Radical
- SIC TV, a television station in Porto Velho, Rondônia, Brazil
- Standing Interpretations Committee, see International Financial Reporting Standards, to provide a common global language for business affairs
- Swiss Interbank Clearing system, a mechanism for the clearing of domestic and international payments
- Standard Industrial Classification, a system for classifying industries by a four-digit code
- United Kingdom Standard Industrial Classification of Economic Activities, intended to classify businesses according to the type of their economic activity
- Scottish Independence Convention, a Scottish convention of pro-independence forces to establish an independent Scotland.
- Security Insurance Company, in Bulgaria

== Science and technology ==
- Segmented Integer Counter mode, a mode of operation in cryptography
- SiC or silicon carbide, a semiconductor, rare mineral, and tool-making material
- Simplified Instructional Computer, a hypothetical computer for learning systems programming
- Simultaneous Inverse Compositional, an algorithm used in facial landmark detection
- Sistema Interconectado Central, power grid in Chile
- Standard Industrial Classification, US codes for classifying industries
- Successive Interference Cancellation, a technique used in wireless communications for receiving data from two wireless sources simultaneously.
- Self-interference cancellation mode of operation of a wireless device, where the device is transmitting and receiving data at the same time.

== Sports ==
- San Isidro Club, an Argentine rugby union club
- Sepang International Circuit, a motorsport track in Malaysia
- Sepang Racing Team, formerly known as SIC Racing Team, a Malaysian Grand Prix motorcycle racing team
- Marco Simoncelli (1987–2011), Italian motorcycle rider, known as Sic

== Other ==
- Southeastern Illinois College, a community college located near Harrisburg, Illinois
- Sic, Cluj, a commune in Romania
- Second-in-command, an officer who backs up a commander or other person in charge
- Super Imaginative Chogokin, die-cast figurines by Bandai

== See also ==
- Sick (disambiguation)
- SC (disambiguation)
