= Love Sickness =

Love Sickness or lovesickness, may refer to:

- Lovesickness, the mental state of unfulfilled or unrequited love

== Music ==
- "LoveSickness", a 2023 song by Don Toliver off the album Love Sick
- "Love Sickness", a 1965 song by Chuck Barris
- "Love Sickness", a 2001 song by Robert Cray off the album Shoulda Been Home
- "Love Sickness" (Chinese: 思念是一種病), a 2006 song by Chang Chen-yue that was nominated for the 19th Golden Melody Awards
- "Lovesickness" (Japanese: 愛の病, romanized: Ai no Yamai, a 2000 song by Aiko off the album Sakura no Ki no Shita
- "Lovesickness", a 2018 song; see Music of Kids on the Slope
- "Love Sickness", a 1992 single by Band of Oz
- "A Love Sickness", a 2006 song; see Death Note original soundtracks

== Stage and screen ==
- Love Sickness (film), a 2000 Thai film by Thunska Pansittivorakul
- "Love Sickness" (episode) Japanese: 恋の病の段), a 1993 TV episode of Nintama Rantarō (season 1)
- "Lovesickness" (episode), a 1999 TV episode of The Real World: Hawaii

== Literature ==
- Lovesickness, a 1996 manga comic by Junji Ito
- "Love Sickness" (story), a 1987 story by Geoff Ryman that won the BSFA Award
- "Lovesickness" (chapter), a serialized manga chapter of the Japanese comic book Chibi Vampire; see List of Chibi Vampire chapters
- "Lovesickness" (chapter), a serialized manga chapter of the Japanese comic book The Wallflower; see List of The Wallflower chapters
- "Lovesickness" (chapter) (Japanese: 恋情, romanized: Renjō), a serialized manga chapter of the Japanese comic book Magi: The Labyrinth of Magic; see List of Magi: The Labyrinth of Magic chapters
- "Lovesickness" (chapter) (Japanese: 恋わずらい, romanized: Koiwazurai), a 2021 serialized manga chapter of the Japanese comic book Farewell, My Dear Cramer

== Other uses ==
- love sickness, a fictional disease from One Piece; see List of fictional diseases
- "Lovesickness" (painting), a 1912 painting by Francisco Pradilla Ortiz

== See also ==
- "Song of Love Sickness" (song) (Chinese: 相思曲), a 2012 song by Yuan Shanshan
- Love Sick (disambiguation)
- Sickness (disambiguation)
- Love (disambiguation)
