= Melody of Love =

Melody of Love or Melodies of Love may refer to:

== Film and television ==
- The Melody of Love, a 1912 American silent short film
- Melody of Love (1928 film), an American romantic musical film
- Melody of Love (1932 film), a German operetta film directed by Georg Jacoby
- Melody of Love (1952 film), an Italian film
- Melody of Love (TV series), a 2013 South Korean daily drama series

== Music ==
Songs:

- "Melody of Love" (song), composed by Hans Engelmann (1903), lyrics by Tom Glazer (1954); recorded by Billy Vaughn (1955) and others
- "Melodie D'Amour" ("Melody of Love"), a 1957 song by The Ames Brothers
- "My Melody of Love", a 1974 song by Bobby Vinton
- "Melody of Love (Wanna Be Loved)", a 1994 song by Donna Summer
- "Melody of Love", a 2019 song by Hot Chip

Albums:

- Melody Of Love, a 1964 album by The Lennon Sisters
- Melodies of Love, a 1974 album by Bobby Vinton
- The Melody of Love, a 1993 album by Lata Mangeshkar
- Melody of Love, a 2006 album by Tim Miner

== See also ==
- Mélodie d'amour (disambiguation)
- "Chanson D'Amour" ("Song of Love"), a 1958 song written by Wayne Shanklin, covered by several artists
