= Mal de amores =

Mal de amores (Spanish: lovesick) is Spanish for lovesickness.

It may refer to:

- Maldeamores (film), a 2007 Puerto-Rican film
- "Mal de Amores" (song), a 2021 song by Sofía Reyes and Becky G.
- "Mal de Amores" (song), a 2007 song by DJ Nelson off the album Flow la Discoteka 2
- "Mal de Amores" (song), a 1999 song by Enanitos Verdes off the album Nectar (Enanitos Verdes album)
- Mal de Amores (album), a 2022 album by Sofia Reyes

== See also ==
- Maladie d'amour (disambiguation) (French: Lovesickness)
- Love Sickness (disambiguation)
- Love Sick (disambiguation)
