= Maladie d'amour =

Maladie d'amour (French for 'lovesickness') may refer to:

- Maladie d'amour (film), 1987 drama directed by Jacques Deray
- "Maladie d'amour" (song), French West Indies folk tune arranged by Henri Salvador
- La Maladie d'amour (album), a 1973 album by Michel Sardou
  - "La Maladie d'amour" (song), a 1973 song by Michel Sardou

== See also ==
- Le mal d'amour, a 1955 stageplay by Marcel Achard
- Mélodie d'amour (disambiguation)
- Mal de amores (disambiguation) (Spanish for Love Sick)
- Love Sickness (disambiguation)
- Love Sick (disambiguation)
