= Lovick =

Lovick is a name. Notable people with the name include:

== Given name ==
- Lovick Edward Jr. (1919-2017), physicist, former Lockheed Skunk Works stealth technologies
- Lovick Friend KBE, CB, PC (1856–1944), British Army major general and cricketer
- Lovick Pierce (1785–1879), the father of Methodist Bishop George Foster Pierce
- Lovick Pierce Thomas, I, quartermaster in the Confederate Army of the Confederate States of America, 1861–1863

== Surname ==
- Dale Lovick (born 1944), educator and former political figure in British Columbia, Canada
- John Lovick (magician), American magician, writer, director, and actor
- John Lovick (politician) (born 1951), American politician

== See also ==
- Love Sick (disambiguation)
- Lovesick (disambiguation)
