= Love Sick =

Love Sick or Lovesick may refer to:

- Lovesickness, the mental state of unfulfilled or unrequited love

== Film and television ==
=== Film ===
- Lovesick (1937 film), an Oswald the Lucky Rabbit cartoon
- Lovesick (1983 film), an American romantic comedy film
- Love Sick (film), a 2006 Romanian drama film
- Lovesick (2014 film), an American comedy film
- Lovesick (2016 film), a Canadian romantic comedy film

=== Television ===
- Lovesick (British TV series), a 2014–2018 British sitcom
- Love Sick (Thai TV series), a 2014–2015 Thai LGBT drama
- "Love Sick" (Grimm), a television episode
- "Lovesick" (Space Ghost Coast to Coast), a television episode

== Music ==
=== Albums ===
- The Lovesick, by Jason Reeves (2011)
- Love Sick (album), by Don Toliver (2023)
- Lovesick (album), by the Happy Fits (2025)
- Lovesick, an EP, or the title song, by Grand Duchy, 2009
- Lovesick, an EP, or the title song, by Chaeryeong, 2026

=== Songs ===
- "Love Sick" (Bob Dylan song), 1998
- "Lovesick" (EliZe song), 2008
- "Lovesick" (Emily Osment song), 2011
- "Lovesick" (Mura Masa song), 2016
- "Lovesick" (Priscilla Renea song), 2010
- "Lovesick" / "Mirrors", by the Getaway Plan, 2013
- "Lovesick" (XO song), 2025
- "Lights (Love Sick)", by Travis Scott (2012)
- "Love Sick", by Beach Bunny from Blame Game, 2021
- "Love Sick", by Trippie Redd from A Love Letter to You 4, 2019
- "Lovesick", by Banks from The Altar, 2016
- "Lovesick", by Beverly McClellan, 2011
- "Lovesick", by Elton John from A Single Man, 1978
- "Lovesick", by Gang Starr from Step in the Arena, 1991
- "Lovesick", by Hans-Peter Lindstrøm and Christabelle from Real Life Is No Cool, 2010
- "Lovesick", by Jacob Whitesides, 2016
- "Lovesick", by Laufey from Bewitched, 2023
- "Lovesick", by Maroon 5 from Jordi, 2021
- "Lovesick", by TLC from FanMail, 1999
- "Lovesick", by Trevor Daniel from Nicotine, 2020
- "Lovesick", by BoyWithUke from Faded (album), 2021

== Other uses ==
- Love Sick (novel), a 2005 young-adult novel by Jake Coburn
- LoveSick, a playing mode in the upcoming video game Yandere Simulator

== See also ==
- "Luv Sick", a song by Ratt from Ratt, 1999
- Maladie d'amour (disambiguation) (French: Lovesickness)
- Mal de amores (disambiguation) (Spanish: Lovesick)
- Love Sickness (disambiguation)
- Love (disambiguation)
- Sick (disambiguation)
