= Sick =

Sick may refer to:

== Medical conditions ==
- Having a disease or infection
- Vomiting or having the urge to vomit (in British English)

== Film and television ==
- Sick: The Life and Death of Bob Flanagan, Supermasochist, a 1997 documentary film
- Sick: Survive the Night, a 2012 Canadian horror film
- Sick (2022 film), an American horror film
- "Sick" (Law & Order: Special Victims Unit), a 2004 TV episode
- "Sick" (The Walking Dead), a 2012 TV episode
- "Sick" (The Young Ones), a 1984 TV episode

== Music ==
- The Sick, a Swedish band formed by two members of Dozer (band)

=== Albums ===
- Sick (Loaded album) or the title song, 2009
- Sick (Massacra album), 1994
- Sick (Sow album), 1998
- Sick!, by Earl Sweatshirt, or the title song, 2022
- Sick (EP), by Beartooth, 2013
- Sicks (album), by Barnes & Barnes, 1986
- The Sicks, an EP by Majandra Delfino, 2001

=== Songs ===
- "Sick" (song), by Adellitas Way, 2011
- "Sick", by Bif Naked from The Promise, 2009
- "Sick", by B'z from New Love, 2019
- "Sick", by CeCe Peniston, 2014
- "Sick", by Cxloe, 2019
- "Sick", by Dope from Felons and Revolutionaries, 1999
- "Sick", by Evanescence from Evanescence, 2011
- "Sick", by the Original 7ven from Condensate, 2011
- "Sick", by Rich the Kid from Boss Man, 2020
- "Sick", by Sadus from Out for Blood, 2006
- "Sick", by Sea Girls, 2021
- "Sick", by Theory of a Deadman from Dinosaur, 2023
- "Sick", by Twelve Foot Ninja from Outlier, 2016

== People with the surname ==
- Anna Sick (1803–1895), German composer and pianist
- Emil Sick (1894–1964), American brewer and sports entrepreneur
- Erwin Sick (1909–1988), German inventor and entrepreneur
- Gary Sick (born 1935), American academic and writer
- Gernot Sick (born 1978), Austrian football player
- Helmut Sick (1910–1991), Brazilian ornithologist
- Ingeborg Maria Sick (1858–1951), Danish writer and philanthropist
- Ingo Sick (1939–2021), Swiss experimental nuclear physicist
- Max Sick (1882–1961), German strongman and gymnast

== Other uses ==
- Sick (magazine), an American humor magazine
- Sick AG, a German sensor technology corporation
- Sick's Stadium, a former baseball stadium in Seattle, Washington, US

== See also ==
- Sick, Sick, Sick (disambiguation)
- Sickness (disambiguation)
- Sicko (disambiguation)
- SIC (disambiguation)
- Sikhs
- Six (disambiguation)
- The Six (disambiguation)
