= Massacra =

French death metal band

- Origin: Franconville, Val-d'Oise, Île-de-France, France
- Genres: Death metal, thrash metal
- Years active: 1986–1997
- Labels: Shark, Phonogram, Vertigo, Rough Trade

Massacra was a French death metal band formed in 1986, described as "one of France's leading death metal bands in the early nineties".

After recording three demos in the 1980s, they signed with German label Shark Records and released their debut, Final Holocaust, in 1990. After two more albums, Enjoy the Violence and Signs of the Decline, they left the label in 1993.

They signed a new deal with Phonogram. By the time of their fourth album, 1994's Sick, the band had shifted to a groove-laden, mid-paced thrash metal.

The band broke up after guitarist Fred Duval died of skin cancer on 6 June 1997 at the age of 29. Some members formed the industrial side project Zero Tolerance in 1996, and released one album through Active Records.

== Discography ==
- Legion of Torture (demo, 1987)
- Final Holocaust (demo, 1988)
- Nearer from Death (demo, 1989)
- Final Holocaust (1990)
- Enjoy the Violence (1991)
- Signs of the Decline (1992)
- Sick (1994)
- Humanize Human (1995)
- Apocalyptic Warriors, Pt. 1 (compilation, 2000)

== Members ==
=== Last lineup ===
- Jean-Marc Tristani – guitar (1986–1997)
- Fred "Death" Duval – vocals, guitar (1986–1997)
- Pascal Jorgensen – vocals, bass (1986–1997)
- Björn Crugger – drums (1995–1997)

=== Former members ===
- Chris Palengat – drums (1988–1991)
- Matthias Limmer – drums (1992–1994)
