= Sicko (disambiguation) =

Sicko is a 2007 documentary film by Michael Moore.

Sicko may also refer to:

- Sicko (band), an American rock band
- Sicko (album), a stand-up comedy album by Doug Stanhope
- Sick-O, an album by the group 3xKrazy
- Sicko, Poland
- Scott Sicko (born 1988), an American football player
- "Sicko" (Brooklyn Nine-Nine), an episode of the sixth season of Brooklyn Nine-Nine

== See also ==
- Sickos
- Sick (disambiguation)
- Sickness (disambiguation)
