= Final Holocaust =

Studio album by Massacra
- Released: January 1990
- Recorded: Late 1989
- Studio: RA.SH Studios
- Genre: Thrash metal, death metal, black metal
- Length: 47:16
- Label: Shark Records
- Producer: Uli Pösselt; co-produced by Axel Thubeauville

Massacra chronology
| Final Holocaust (1990) | Enjoy the Violence (1991) |

Final Holocaust is the debut album by the French death metal band Massacra. It was released in 1990 by Shark Records. The re-release includes three demo tracks taken from the Nearer from Death demo.

The album was rated 4 out of 5 stars by AllMusic.

== Track listing ==
- All songs written and arranged by Massacra.
1. "Apocalyptic Warrior" – 5:24
2. "Researchers of Tortures" – 4:01
3. "Sentenced for Life" – 5:12
4. "War of Attrition" – 4:46
5. "Trained to Kill" – 4:13
6. "Nearer to Death" – 5:32
7. "Final Holocaust" – 5:39
8. "Eternal Hate" – 3:23
9. "The Day of Massacra" – 5:45
10. "Beyond The Prophecy" – 3:21
11. "Apocalyptic Warrior" – 6:05 (Demo 1989)
12. "Nearer From Death" – 7:50 (Demo 1989)
13. "Sentenced For Life" – 5:16 (Demo 1989)

== Personnel ==
- Jean-Marc Tristani - Lead Guitar
- Fred Duval - Rhythm Guitar, Vocals
- Pascal Jorgensen - Vocals, Bass
- Chris Palengat - Drums
- Gil Formosa - artwork
