= Enjoy the Violence =

Studio album by Massacra
- Released: January 1991
- Length: 35:54
- Label: Shark Records
- Producer: Ulli Pösselt

Massacra chronology
| Final Holocaust (1990) | Enjoy the Violence (1991) | Signs of the Decline (1992) |

Enjoy the Violence is the second album by the French death/thrash metal band Massacra, released in 1991.

== Reception ==
Professional ratings
Review scores
| Source | Rating |
|---|---|
| AllMusic | 4.5/5 stars |

== Track listing ==
1. "Enjoy the Violence" – 3:39
2. "Ultimate Antichrist" – 3:41
3. "Gods of Hate" – 2:56
4. "Atrocious Crimes" – 4:01
5. "Revealing Cruelty" – 3:32
6. "Full of Hatred" – 5:00
7. "Seas of Blood" – 2:05
8. "Near Death Experience" – 4:15
9. "Sublime Extermination" – 2:51
10. "Agonizing World" – 3:51

== Personnel ==
- Jean-Marc Tristani - Guitars
- Fred Duval - Guitars, Vocals
- Pascal Jorgensen - Vocals, Bass
- Chris Palengat - Drums
