= Sic (experimental musician) =

[sic]
- Origin: Montreal, Quebec, Canada
- Genres: experimental music, noise
- Occupation: Composer
- Years active: 2001–present

[sic] (Jennifer Morris) is a Lausanne-based visual artist and electronic noise artist originally from Montreal, Quebec, Canada.

== Biography ==
Morris studied fine arts and psychology and was trained as a specialist in video art and cinema in both Montreal and Vancouver. She has played MUTEK, LUFF, Transmediale, Send & Receive, Netmage, Digitales, Les Digitales, DeNoise, VUFF and other festivals and tours over the years. In 2003 she made the installation Disorientation in Place Ville Marie and on Mount-Royal. In 2011 she made the albums Early Leaves Part I and Part 2 in collaboration with Consor. In spring 2011 and 2012 and she toured Japan.

Jen Morris also has a duo project called Morisato with the Japanese guitarist Hiroko Pennec-Sato.

== Discography ==
- [sic], self titled EP 2001
- ...And Rabbits Named Friday, CD 2002, Squirrelgirl Records
- Gorilla Masking Tape, 2004 Piehead Records
- ’Happenis’ by [sic] on Soundmuseum, 2008
- [sic] & Consor – Early Leaves Part I, 2011 Absence Of Wax
- [sic] & Consor – Early Leaves Part 2, 2011 Creaked Records

== Other sources ==
- Review of ...And Rabbits Named Friday on BBC
- Review of ...And Rabbits Named Friday by Stylus Magazine
