= Signs of the Decline =

Studio album by Massacra
- Released: 1992
- Genre: Thrash metal, death metal
- Length: 39:43
- Label: Vertigo
- Producer: Tim Buktu

Massacra chronology
Enjoy the Violence (1991)	Signs of the Decline (1992)	Sick (1994)

Signs of the Decline is the third album by Massacra. It was released in 1992. The re-release contains six tracks from the Sick album as a bonus.

== Reception ==
Professional ratings
Review scores
Source	Rating
AllMusic	3/5 stars

Eduardo Rivadavia of AllMusic said that Massacra took a step backwards from their previous studio album, Enjoy the Violence.

== Track listing ==
1. "Evidence of Abominations" – 4:00
2. "Defying Man's Creation" – 3:39
3. "Baptized in Decadence" – 4:28
4. "Mortify their Flesh" – 4:01
5. "Traumatic Paralyzed Mind" – 3:56
6. "Excruciating Commands" – 3:48
7. "Worlds Dies Screaming" – 3:22
8. "Signs of the Decline" – 4:01
9. "Civilisation in Regression" – 4:04
10. "Full Frontal Assault" – 4:27

== Personnel ==
- Jean-Marc Tristani - Guitars
- Fred Duval - Guitars, Vocals
- Pascal Jorgensen - Vocals, Bass
- Matthias Limmer - Drums
