= Sick, Sick, Sick (disambiguation) =

"Sick, Sick, Sick" is a song by Queens of the Stone Age.

Sick, Sick, Sick may also refer to:

- Sick, Sick, Sick (film), a 2019 Brazilian film
- Sick, Sick, Sick, a 1958 book of cartoons by Jules Feiffer
- "Sick, Sick, Sick", an episode of Pete and Gladys
- "Sick, Sick, Sick", an episode of Queer as Folk

== Music ==
- Sick, Sick, Sick, a 1987 album by Demented Are Go
- "Sick Sick Sick", a song by 16volt from Beating Dead Horses
- "Sick, Sick, Sick", a song by Bayside from Killing Time
- "Sick Sick Sick", a song by Boris the Sprinkler
- "Sick, Sick, Sick", a song by Jimmy Sweeney

== See also ==
- Sick (disambiguation)
