= Humanize Human =

Studio album by Massacra
- Released: 1995
- Genre: Thrash metal, groove metal
- Length: 50:12
- Label: Rough Trade
- Producer: Tim Buktu

Massacra chronology
Sick (1994)	Humanize Human (1995)

Humanize Human is the fifth and final album by French metal band Massacra. It was released in 1995.

== Track listing ==
1. "Need for Greed" – 7:39
2. "Feel Unreal" – 4:33
3. "My Only Friend" – 4:06
4. "Mad to be Normal" – 5:30
5. "How Free are You" – 5:21
6. "Humanize Human" – 5:10
7. "Dejected" – 5:40
8. "Zero Tolerance" – 4:53
9. "Pay for my Tears" – 7:17

== Personnel ==
- Jean-Marc Tristani - Lead guitar
- Fred Duval - Rhythm guitar
- Pascal Jorgensen - Vocals, Bass
- Björn Crugger - Drums
