= Self-interference cancellation =

Self-interference cancellation (SIC) is a signal processing technique that enables a radio transceiver to simultaneously transmit and receive on a single channel, a pair of partially-overlapping channels, or any pair of channels in the same frequency band. When used to allow simultaneous transmission and reception on the same frequency, sometimes referred to as “in-band full-duplex” or “simultaneous transmit and receive,” SIC effectively doubles spectral efficiency. SIC also enables devices and platforms containing two radios that use the same frequency band to operate both radios simultaneously.

Self-interference cancellation has applications in mobile networks, the unlicensed bands, cable TV, mesh networks, the military, and public safety.

In-band full-duplex has advantages over conventional duplexing schemes. A frequency division duplexing (FDD) system transmits and receives at the same time by using two (usually widely separated) channels in the same frequency band. In-band full-duplex performs the same function using half of the spectrum resources. A time division duplexing (TDD) system operates half-duplex on a single channel, creating the illusion of full-duplex communication by rapidly switching back-and-forth between transmit and receive. In-band full-duplex radios achieve twice the throughput using the same spectrum resources.

== Techniques ==
A radio transceiver cannot cancel out its own transmit signal based solely on knowledge of what information is being sent and how the transmit signal is constructed. The signal that the receiver sees is not entirely predictable. The signal that appears at the receiver is subject to varying delays. It consists of a combination of leakage (the signal traveling directly from the transmitter to the receiver) and local reflections. In addition, transmitter components (such as mixers and power amplifiers) introduce non-linearities that generate harmonics and noise. These distortions must be sampled at the output of the transmitter. Finally, the self-interference cancellation solution must detect and compensate for real-time changes caused by temperature variations, mechanical vibrations, and the motion of things in the environment.

The transmit signal can be cancelled out at the receiver by creating an accurate model of the signal and using it to generate a new signal that when combined with the signal arriving at the receiver leaves only the desired receive signal. The precise amount of cancellation required will vary depending on the power of the transmit signal that is the source of the self-interference and the signal-to-noise ratio (SNR) that the link is expected to handle in half-duplex mode. A typical figure for Wi-Fi and cellular applications is 110 dB of signal cancellation, though some applications require greater cancellation.

Cancelling a local transmit signal requires a combination of analog and digital electronics. The strength of the transmit signal can be modestly reduced before it reaches the receiver by using a circulator (if a shared antenna is used) or antenna isolation techniques (such as cross polarization) if separate antennas are used. The analog canceller is most effective at handling strong signals with a short delay spread. A digital canceller is most effective at handling weak signals with delays greater than 1,000 nanoseconds. The analog canceller should contribute at least 60 dB of cancellation. The digital canceller must process both linear and non-linear signal components, producing about 50 dB of cancellation. Both the analog and digital cancellers consist of a number of “taps” composed of attenuators, phase shifters, and delay elements. The cost, size, and complexity of the SIC solution is primarily determined by the analog stage. Also essential are the tuning algorithms that enable the canceller to adapt to rapid changes. Cancellation algorithms typically need to adapt at the rate of once every few hundred microseconds to keep up with changes in the environment.

SIC can also be employed to reduce or eliminate adjacent channel interference. This allows a device containing two radios (such as a Wi-Fi access Point with two 5 GHz radios) to use any pair of channels regardless of separation. Adjacent channel interference consists of two main components. The signal on the transmit frequency, known as the blocker, may be so strong that it desensitizes a receiver listening on an adjacent channel. A strong, local transmitter also produces noise that spills over onto the adjacent channel. SIC may be used to reduce both the blocker and the noise that might otherwise prevent use of an adjacent channel.

== Applications ==
=== In-band full duplex ===
Transmitting and receiving on exactly the same frequency at exactly the same time has multiple purposes. In-band full duplex can potentially double spectral efficiency. It permits true full duplex operation where only a single frequency is available. And it enables “listen while talking” operation (see cognitive radio, below).

=== Integrated access and backhaul ===
Though most small cells are expected to be fed using fiber optic cable, running fiber isn't always practical. Reuse of the frequencies used by a small cell to communicate with users (“access”) for communication between the small cell and the network (“backhaul”) will be part of the 3GPP's 5G standards. When implemented using SIC, the local backhaul radio's transmit signal is cancelled out at the small cell's receiver, and the small cell's transmit signal is cancelled out at the local backhaul radio's receiver. No changes are required to the users’ devices or the remote backhaul radio. The use of SIC in this applications has been successfully field-tested by Telecom Italia Mobile and Deutsche Telekom.

=== Satellite repeaters ===
SIC enables satellite repeaters to extend coverage to indoor, urban canyon, and other locations by reusing the same frequencies. This type of repeater is essentially two radios connected back-to-back. One radio faces the satellite, while the other radio faces the area not in direct coverage. The two radios relay the signals (rather than store-and-forward data bits) and must be isolated from each other to prevent feedback. The satellite-facing radio listens to the satellite and must be isolated from the transmitter repeating the signal. Likewise, the indoor-facing radio listens for indoor users and must be isolated from the transmitter repeating their signals to the satellite. SIC may be used to cancel out each radio's transmit signal at the other radio's receiver.

=== Full-duplex DOCSIS 3.1 ===
Cable networks have traditionally allocated most of their capacity to downstream transmissions. The recent growth in user-generated content calls for more upstream capacity. Cable Labs developed the Full Duplex DOCSIS 3.1 standard to enable symmetrical service at speeds up to 10 Gbit/s in each direction. In DOCSIS 3.1, different frequencies are allocated for upstream and downstream transmissions, separated by a guard band. Full Duplex DOCSIS establishes a new band allowing a mix of upstream and downstream channels on adjacent channels. The headend must support simultaneous transmission and reception across the full duplex band, which requires SIC technology. The cable modems are not required to transmit and receive on the same channels simultaneously, but they are required to use different combinations of upstream and downstream channels as instructed by the headend.

=== Wireless mesh networks ===
Mesh networks are used to extend coverage (to cover entire homes) and for ad-hoc networking (emergency communication). Wireless mesh networks use a mesh topology to provide the desired coverage. The data travels from one node to another until it reaches its destination. In mesh networks using a single frequency, the data is typically store-and-forwarded, with each hop adding a delay. SIC can enable wireless mesh nodes to reuse frequencies so that the data is retransmitted (relayed) as it is received. In mesh networks using multiple frequencies, such as whole-home Wi-Fi networks using “tri-band” routers, SIC can enable greater flexibility in channel selection. Tri-band routers have one 2.4 GHz and one 5 GHz radio to communicate with client devices, and a second 5 GHz radio that is used exclusively for internode communication. Most tri-band routers use the same pair of 80 MHz channels (at opposite ends of the 5 GHz band) to minimize interference. SIC can allow tri-band routers to use any of the six 80-MHz channels in the 5 GHz band for coordination both within networks and between neighboring networks.

=== Military communication ===
The military frequently requires multiple, high power radios on the same air, land, or sea platform for tactical communication. These radios must be reliable even in the face of interference and enemy jamming. SIC enables multiple radios to operate on the same platform at the same time. SIC also has potential applications in military and vehicular radar, allowing radar systems to transmit and receive continuously rather than constantly switching between transmit and receive, yielding higher resolution. These new capabilities have been recognized as a potential 'superpower' for armed forces that may bring about a paradigm shift in tactical communications and electronic warfare.

=== Spectrum sharing ===
National regulatory agencies, such as the Federal Communications Commission in the U.S., often address the need for more spectrum resources by permitting sharing of underutilized spectrum. For instance, billions of Wi-Fi and Bluetooth devices compete for access to the ISM bands. Smartphones, Wi-Fi routers, and smart home hubs frequently support Wi-Fi, Bluetooth, and other wireless technologies in the same device. SIC technology enables these devices to operate two radios in the same band at the same time. Spectrum sharing is a topic of great interest to the mobile phone industry as it begins to deploy 5G systems.

=== Cognitive radio ===
Radios that dynamically select idle channels to make more efficient use of finite spectrum resources are the subject of considerable research. Traditional spectrum sharing schemes rely on Listen-before-talk protocols. However, when two or more radios choose to transmit on the same channel at the same time there is a collision. Collisions take time to detect and resolve. SIC enables listen-while-talking, ensuring immediate detection and faster resolution of collisions.

== See also ==
- Cognitive radio
- DOCSIS
- Duplex (telecommunications)
- Mesh networking
- Successive Interference Cancellation
