= Sick (Massacra album) =

Studio album by Massacra
- Released: 1994
- Genre: Thrash metal, groove metal
- Length: 54:57
- Label: Phonogram Records
- Producer: Tim Buktu

Massacra chronology
Signs of the Decline (1992)	Sick (1994)	Humanize Human (1995)

Sick is the fourth album by French metal band Massacra. It introduces a notable change in the musical direction, including mid-paced thrash and groove elements. It was released in 1994.

== Track listing ==
1. "Twisted Mind" – 6:44
2. "Madness Remains" – 5:43
3. "Ordinary People" – 5:16
4. "Closed Minded" – 5:00
5. "Harmless Numbers" – 5:00
6. "Lack of Talk" – 5:02
7. "Broken Youth" – 4:43
8. "Can’t Stand" – 5:03
9. "My Reality" – 5:13
10. "Suckers" – 4:32
11. "Piece of Real" – 2:41

== Personnel ==
- Jean-Marc Tristani - Lead guitar
- Fred Duval - Rhythm guitar
- Pascal Jorgensen - Vocals, Bass
- Matthias Limmer - Drums
