= Glenn Consor =

American sports announcer

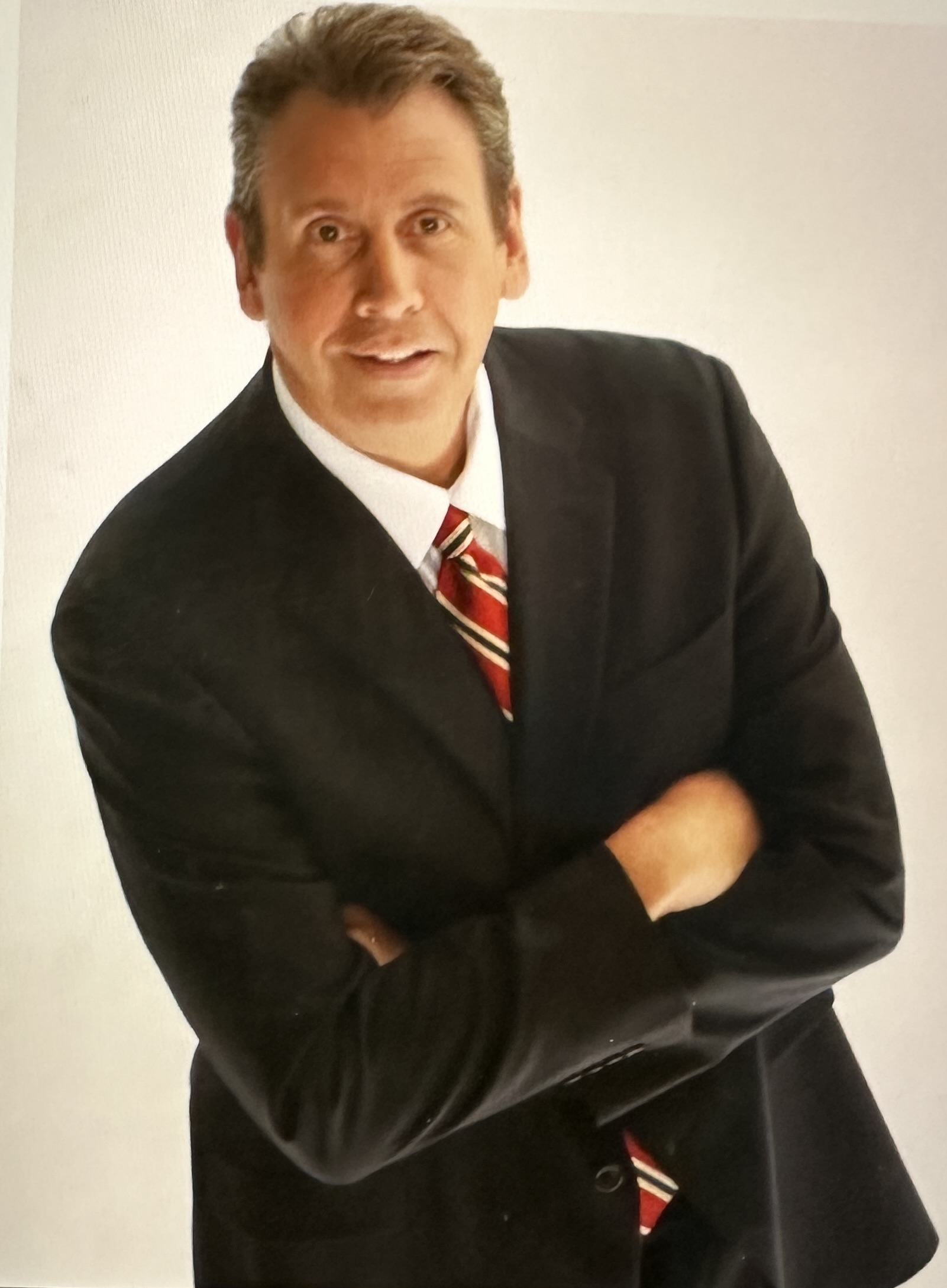
- Born: Queens, New York, U.S.
- Education: Boston University
- Occupations: Basketball player, sportscaster
- Children: 2

Glenn Consor is a National Basketball Association (NBA) and NCAA basketball analyst and studio host who played collegiate and pro basketball. He was also an NBA scout, which led to his broadcasting career. He played professional basketball for Maccabi Haifa in the Israeli Premier Basketball League.

== Biography ==
Consor was born in Queens, New York, grew up in Flushing in Queens, He attended and played basketball for Bayside High School.

Consor earned a scholarship to Boston University, where he was on the Dean's List. He was a starting point guard for coach Rick Pitino from 1976 to 1980. In his senior year, in 1979–80, he averaged 10.6 points, 4.3 assists, and 2.2 rebounds per game.

He then played professional basketball for Maccabi Haifa in the Israeli Premier Basketball League in Israel in 1980–82.

Consor has more than 30 years of experience in the broadcast industry, including 30 years with the Washington Wizards (formerly the Bullets) organization in radio and television roles. During that time he has combined his knowledge for college and professional basketball for NBA-TV, Comcast SportsNet, ESPN Regional and Westwood One. He previously served seven years as a scout for the same organization, as well as the Indiana Pacers.

His speaking engagements have included presentations for Morgan Stanley, St. Jude Medical, Washington Wizards Basketball Camps and Five-Star Basketball Camps. He is known for his extensive charitable work in the greater DC area on behalf of cancer research, and a variety of initiatives to house and feed the poor.

== Personal life ==
Consor, who works with Men Against Breast Cancer and the Washington Animal Rescue League, is married and is the father to two sons, Kenny and Jonny.
