= Mélodie d'amour =

Mélodie d'amour may refer to:

- "Mélodie d'amour" (Kaoma song), a 1990 single by Kaoma
- "Melodie d'Amour", English version by the Ames Brothers of "Maladie d'amour" by Henri Salvador
- "Mélodie d'amour", song by George Baker Selection composed by J. Bouwens 1973
- "Ma mélodie d'amour", song by Mireille Mathieu 1976

== See also ==
- Maladie d'amour (disambiguation)
