= Sickness =

Sickness may refer to:

- Disease
- Nausea
- Sickness behavior

== Other uses ==
- The Sickness, 2000 album by Disturbed
- The Sickness (novel), 1999 book in the Animorphs series
- Corey Taylor, nicknamed "The Sickness", American heavy metal musician
- (sic)nesses, 2010 video album by Slipknot

== See also ==
- Sick (disambiguation)
- Sicko (disambiguation)
