= List of Magi: The Labyrinth of Magic chapters =

Magi: The Labyrinth of Magic is a Japanese manga series written and illustrated by Shinobu Ohtaka. It was serialized in Shogakukan's Weekly Shōnen Sunday magazine from 2009 to 2017. Its chapters were collected in 37 tankōbon volumes. All chapters are labelled as "Nights" in an allusion to the tales of the One Thousand and One Nights which served as a primary source of inspiration to the story.

The series is licensed for English language release in North America by Viz Media, who published the first volume on August 13, 2013.

== Volumes ==
No.	Original release date	Original ISBN	English release date	English ISBN
1	December 18, 2009	978-4-09-122063-9	August 13, 2013	978-1-4215-5951-3
Night 01. "His Name is Aladdin" (その名はアラジン, Sono Na wa Arajin); Night 02. "His Name is Alibaba" (その名はアリババ, Sono Na wa Aribaba); Night 03. "Aladdin and Alibaba" (アラジンとアリババ, Arajin to Aribaba); Night 04. "Dungeon Diving" (迷宮組曲, Danjon Kumikyoku); Night 05. "Adventure" (冒険, Bōken); Night 06. "The Dungeon's Center" (迷宮の中, Danjon no Naka); Night 07. "Dungeon's Menace" (迷宮の脅威, Danjon no Kyōi)
2	December 18, 2009	978-4-09-122064-6	October 8, 2013	978-1-4215-5952-0
Night 08. "Aladdin's True Identity" (アラジンの正体, Arajin no Shōtai); Night 09. "Tyrant" (暴君, Bōkun); Night 10. "Sabotage" (望郷, Bōkyō); Night 11. "Necropolis" (ネクロポリス, Nekuroporisu); Night 12. "Place That Strains Life" (命張る場所, Inochi Haru Basho); Night 13. "Magician of World Creation" (創世の魔法使い, Sōsei no Mahōtsukai); Night 14. "Lord of The Dungeon" (迷宮の主, Danjon no Nushi); Night 15. "Clear" (完全攻略, Kuria); Night 16. "The Promise" (約束, Yakusoku); Night 17. "Day of The Journey" (旅立ちの日, Tabidachi no Hi)
3	March 18, 2010	978-4-09-122196-4	December 10, 2013	978-1-4215-5953-7
Night 18. "Rukh" (ルフ, Rufu); Night 19. "The Great Kouga Empire" (大黄牙帝国, Dai Kouga Teikoku); Night 20. "Slave Hunting" (奴隷狩り, Dorei Gari); Night 21. "Legend" (伝説, Densetsu); Night 22. "War" (戦争, Sensō); Night 23. "The Home of Souls" (魂の故郷, Tamashī no Furusato); Night 24. "Dungeon Capturer" (迷宮攻略者, Danjon Kōryakusha); Night 25. "Paimon" (パイモン); Night 26. "Guide" (導かれし者, Michibika Reshi Mono); Night 27. "The Scar That Can't Disappear" (消えないあざ, Kienai Aza)
4	June 18, 2010	978-4-09-122336-4	February 11, 2014	978-1-4215-5954-4
Night 28. "The "Fanalis" Warrior Clan" (戦闘民族ファナリス, Sentō Minzoku Fanarisu); Night 29. "Slave" (奴隷, Dorei); Night 30. "Miracle" (奇跡, Kiseki); Night 31. "Banquet" (宴, Utage); Night 32. "Road to Balbadd" (バルバッドへの道, Barubaddo e no Michi); Night 33. "His Name is Sinbad" (その名はシンドバッド, Sono Na wa Shindobaddo); Night 34. "Answer" (答え, Kotae); Night 35. "The Fog Dissipates" (霧散, Musan); Night 36. "The Fog Troupe" (霧の団, Kiri no Dan); Night 37. "Remembrance" (月見, Tsukimi)
5	August 18, 2010	978-4-09-122527-6	April 8, 2014	978-1-4215-5955-1
Night 38. "Junkyard Street" (ゴミ溜めの街, Gomidame no Machi); Night 39. "Incident" (事件, Jiken); Night 40. "Rest Assured" (大丈夫, Daijōbu); Night 41. "Attack" (襲撃, Shūgeki); Night 42. "Alibaba and Sinbad" (アリババとシンドバッド, Aribaba to Shindobaddo); Night 43. "Alibaba and Ahbmad" (アリババとアブマド, Aribaba to Abumado); Night 44. "Black Sun" (黒い太陽, Kuroi Taiyō); Night 45. "His Name Is Judar" (その名はジュダル, Sono Na wa Judaru); Night 46. "Two "Magi"" (二人のマギ, Futari no Magi); Night 47. "Magic" (魔法, Mahō); Night 48. "Ugo" (ウーゴくん, Ūgo-kun)
6	October 18, 2010	978-4-09-122629-7	June 10, 2014	978-1-4215-5956-8
Night 49. "A New Visitor" (新たなる来訪者, Aratanaru Raihōsha); Night 50. "Melee" (乱戦, Ransen); Night 51. "After the Battle" (戦いの後, Tatakai no Ato); Night 52. "Alibaba and Sahbmad" (アリババとサブマド, Aribaba to Sabumado); Night 53. "Savior" (救う者, Sukuumono); Night 54. "Duty" (責任, Sekinin); Night 55. "Determination" (決意, Ketsui); Night 56. "The Djinn's Metal Vessel" (ジンの金属器, Jin no Kinzoku Ki); Night 57. "Dowry" (結納品, Yuinō Hin); Night 58. "Djinn Equip!" (魔装, Masō)
7	January 18, 2011	978-4-09-122770-6	August 12, 2014	978-1-4215-5957-5
Night 59. "Assault" (突撃, Totsugeki); Night 60. "Repeated Showdown" (再対決, Sai Taiketsu); Night 61. "Rebellion" (反逆, Hangyaku); Night 62. "Alibaba's Answer" (アリババの答え, Aribaba no Kotae); Night 63. "Alibaba's Sophism" (アリババの屁理屈, Aribaba no Herikutsu); Night 64. "The Republic of Balbadd" (バルバッド共和国, Barubaddo Kyōwakoku); Night 65. "Cassim's Reply" (カシムの答え, Kashimu no Kotae); Night 66. "Holy Palace's Aladdin" (聖宮のアラジン, Seikyū no Arajin); Night 67. "Clash" (激突, Gekitotsu); Night 68. "The Black Rukh's Djinn" (黒きルフのジン, Kuroki Rufu no Jin)
8	April 18, 2011	978-4-09-122853-6	October 14, 2014	978-1-4215-5958-2
Night 69. "The Will of Revolution" (革命の意志, Kakumei no Ishi); Night 70. "Bird" (鳥, Tori); Night 71. "Alibaba" (アリババとは, Aribaba to wa); Night 72. "Wisdom of Solomon" (ソロモンの知恵, Soromon no Chie); Night 73. "Rukh's Will" (ルフの意志, Rufu no Ishi); Night 74. "Something Sublime" (崇高な何か, Sūkōna Nanika); Night 75. "Cassim" (カシムとは, Kashimu to wa); Night 76. "Smile" (笑顔, Egao); Night 77. "Sindria Kingdom" (シンドリア王国, Shindoria Ōkoku); Night 78. "Magicians" (魔法使い, Mahōtsukai)
9	July 15, 2011	978-4-09-123198-7	December 9, 2014	978-1-4215-5959-9
Night 79. "Alibaba's Sword" (アリババの剣, Aribaba no Ken); Night 80. "Eight Generals" (八人将, Hachi Nin Shō); Night 81. "Mahrajan's Night" (謝肉宴の夜, Maharagān no Yoru); Night 82. "A Big Country" (大きな国, Ōkina Kuni); Night 83. "Everyone's Daily Life" (それぞれの日々, Sorezore no Hibi); Night 84. "Kougyoku And Sinbad" (紅玉とシンドバッド, Kōgyoku to Shindobaddo); Night 85. "The Culprit Is?" (犯人は?, Han'nin wa?); Night 86. "His Name is Ren Hakuryuu" (その名は練白龍, Sono Na wa Ren Hakuryū); Night 87. "The Royal Prince and the Imperial Prince" (王子と皇子, Ōji to Ōji); Night 88. "The Voyage Towards Zagan" (ザガンへの船旅, Zagan e no Funatabi)
10	October 18, 2011	978-4-09-123335-6	February 10, 2015	978-1-4215-5960-5
Night 89. "The best Thing I Can Do Now" (今できる最良のこと, Ima Dekiru Sairyō no Koto); Night 90. "Another Dungeon" (迷宮再び, Danjon Futatabi); Night 91. "Inside of Zagan" (ザガンの中, Zagan no Naka); Night 92. "Zagan Appears" (ザガン登場, Zagan Tōjō); Night 93. "Halhaal Rasas" (灼熱の連弾, Haruhāru Rasāsu); Night 94. "Your Power" (あなたの力, Anata no Chikara); Night 95. "Weakling" (弱虫, Yowamushi); Night 96. "Zagan's Magic" (ザガンの魔法, Zagan no Mahō); Night 97. "Activation" (発動, Hatsudō); Night 98. "Assassin" (発動, Shikaku)
11	January 18, 2012	978-4-09-123535-0	April 14, 2015	978-1-4215-5961-2
Night 99. "The Dark Metal Vessel Again" (闇の金属器再び, Yami no Kinzoku Ki Futatabi); Night 100. "Trump Card" (切り札, Kirifuda); Night 101. "Dark Djinn Equip" (闇の魔装, Yami no Masō); Night 102. "Extreme Magic" (極大魔法, Kyokudai Mahō); Night 103. "Turn of Fate" (運命の逆流, Unmei no Gyakuryū); Night 104. "The True Nature of Strength" (力の本質, Chikara no Honshitsu); Night 105. "Dungeon Conqueror" (迷宮攻略者, Meikyū Kōryakusha); Night 106. "I Can Still Fight!!" (私はまだ戦える!!, Watashi wa Mada Tatakaeru!!); Night 107. "Fury" (激情, Gekijō); Night 108. "Swordsmen" (剣士, Kenshi)
12	April 18, 2012	978-4-09-123648-7	June 9, 2015	978-1-4215-5962-9
Night 109. "Genius" (天才, Tensai); Night 110. "The Fourth Magi" (4人目のマギ, 4 Hitome no Magi); Night 111. "Dungeon Conqueror's Banquet" (迷宮攻略者の宴, Danjon Kōryakusha no Utage); Night 112. "Path" (道, Michi); Night 113. "Curse" (呪い, Noroi); Night 114. "High King" (覇王, Haō); Night 115. "Inside Alibaba" (アリババの中, Aribaba no Naka); Night 116. "Turning Point" (転機, Tenki); Night 117. "The Premonition of a New Journey" (旅立ちの予感, Tabidachi no Yokan); Night 118. "The Reason for Determination" (決意の訳, Ketsui no Wake)
13	July 18, 2012	978-4-09-123774-3	August 11, 2015	978-1-4215-5963-6
Night 119. "Pairing" (別離, Betsuri); Night 120. "Zepar" (ゼパル, Zeparu); Night 121. "Departure" (出航, Shukkō); Night 122. "The Journey By Boat" (船旅, Funatabi); Night 123. "Pirates" (海賊, Kaizoku); Night 124. "Zagan's Activation" (ザガン発動, Zagan Hatsudō); Night 125. "Breaking into" (突入, Totsunyū); Night 126. "The Pirate's Fortress" (海賊砦, Kaizoku Toride); Night 127. "Ice Spear" (氷の槍, Kōri no Yari); Night 128. "Mother" (母, Haha)
14	September 18, 2012	978-4-09-123850-4	October 13, 2015	978-1-4215-59643
Night 129. "Independence" (自立, Jiritsu); Night 130. "Dark Memories" (闇の記憶, Yami no Kioku); Night 131. "Bitter Enemy" (仇敵, Kyūteki); Night 132. "Confession" (告白, Kokuhaku); Night 133. "Gentle Person" (優しい人, Yasashii Hito); Night 134. "The Night Before Farewells" (前日, Zenjitsu); Night 135. "Travelling Alone" (一人旅, Hitoritabi); Night 136. "Ren Kouha" (練紅覇, Ren Kōha); Night 137. "Special Training" (特訓の日々, Tokkun no Hibi); Night 138. "Daily Lessons" (学問の日々, Gakumon no Hibi)
15	November 16, 2012	978-4-09-124009-5	December 8, 2015	978-1-4215-5965-0
Night 139. "Reim Empire" (レーム帝国, Rēmu Teikoku); Night 140. "Yambala" (ヤンバラ, Yanbara); Night 141. "Colosseum" (闘技場, Tōgiba); Night 142. "Fusion" (融合, Yūgō); Night 143. "The High Priestess" (最高司祭, Saikō Shisai); Night 144. "The Great Rift" (大峡谷, Dai Kyōkoku); Night 145. "Gathering" (集会, Shūkai); Night 146. "One World" (一つの世界, Hitotsu no Sekai); Night 147. "A New Emperor" (新たなる皇帝, Aratanaru Kōtei); Night 148. "Another 6 Months Later" (さらに半年後, Sarani Hantoshi-go)
16	February 18, 2013	978-4-09-124181-8	February 9, 2016	978-1-4215-7792-0
Night 149. "Titus Alexius" (ティトス・アレキウス, Titosu Arekiusu); Night 150. "Aladdin vs Titus" (アラジンVSティトス, Arajin VS Titosu); Night 151. "Aberrant Magic" (超律魔法, Chō Ritsu Mahō); Night 152. "Titus' True Identity" (ティトスの正体, Titosu no Shōtai); Night 153. "Mission" (使命, Shimei); Night 154. "Cooperation" (協力, Kyōryoku); Night 155. "The 5th Level Authorization District" (5等許可区, 5 tō Kyokaku); Night 156. "Livestock" (家畜, Kachiku); Night 157. "Magoi Furnace" (魔力炉, Magoi Ro); Night 158. "Ideology Reformation" (思想教育, Shisō Kyōiku)
17	May 17, 2013	978-4-09-124301-0	April 12, 2016	978-1-4215-7793-7
Night 159. "The Magician's Solitude" (魔導士の孤独, Madōshi no Kodoku); Night 160. "The Magician's Country" (魔導士の国, Madōshi no Kuni); Night 161. "Transformation" (変化, Henka); Night 162. "The Truth About Mogamett" (モガメットの真実, Mogametto no Shinjitsu); Night 163. "Zemi" (研究室, Zemi); Night 164. "The Truth About Titus" (ティトスの真実, Titosu no Shinjitsu); Night 165. "Genesis" (発端, Hottan); Night 166. "Before the Beginning of the War" (開戦の前, Kaisen no Mae); Night 167. "War Cry" (鬨のこえ, Toki no Koe); Night 168. "Guardian Deities" (守護神, Shugoshin)
18	September 18, 2013	978-4-09-124383-6	June 14, 2016	978-1-4215-8394-5
Night 169. "The Power of the People" (人の力, Hito no Chikara); Night 170. "Magic Weapon" (魔導兵器, Madō Heiki); Night 171. "Prey" (エサ, Esa); Night 172. "Fanalis vs Magicians" (ファナリスVS魔法使い, Fanarisu VS Mahōtsukai); Night 173. "The King of Beasts" (獣の王, Kemono no Ō); Night 174. "The Power of a Magi" (マギの力, Magi no Chikara); Night 175. "Fighting Spirit" (戦う心, Tatakau Kokoro); Night 176. "Barbatos" (バルバトス, Barubatosu); Night 177. "The High Priestess" (最高司祭, Saikō Shisai); Night 178. "The Dark Spot" (暗黒点, Ankokuten)
19	October 18, 2013	978-4-09-124453-6	August 9, 2016	978-1-4215-8395-2
Night 179. "Towards the Deepest Sector" (最深部へ, Saishinbu e); Night 180. "Kouha Ren. The King Vessel" (練紅覇という王の器, Ren Kōha to iu Ō no Utsuwa); Night 181. "Completion" (完成, Kansei); Night 182. "Amon's Djinn Equip" (魔装アモン, Masō Amon); Night 183. "Confrontation" (対面, Taimen); Night 184. "Titus and Marga" (ティトスとマルガ, Titosu to Maruga); Night 185. "The Last Power" (最後の力, Saigo no Chikara); Night 186. "Kouen and Alibaba" (紅炎とアリババ, Kōen to Aribaba); Night 187. "The Great Assemble" (大集結, Dai Shūketsu); Night 188. "The Djinn Warriors" (魔装戦士達, Masō Senshi-tachi)
20	January 17, 2014	978-4-09-124552-6	October 11, 2016	978-1-4215-8396-9
Night 189. "Ten Thousand" (一万匹, Ichi Man Biki); Night 190. "Union of Flames" (炎の共闘, Honō no Kyōtō); Night 191. "The One Who Eats Rukh" (ルクを喰うモノ, Rufu o Kuu Mono); Night 192. "Fierce Attacks" (猛攻, Mōkō); Night 193. "The Treacherous Magi" (裏切りのマギ, Uragiri no Magi); Night 194. "The Hour of Downfall" (滅亡の時, Metsubō no Toki); Night 195. "Full Power" (全ての力, Subete no Chikara); Night 196. "Hesitation" (迷い, Mayoi); Night 197. "The Message" (伝言, Dengon); Night 198. "Welcome Home" (おかえりなさい, Okaerinasai)
21	April 18, 2014	978-4-09-124621-9	December 13, 2016	978-1-4215-8397-6
Night 199. "After the War" (戦の後, Ikusa no Ato); Night 200. "Manly Tears" (男の涙, Otoko no Namida); Night 201. "The Invitation Letter to Balbadd" (バルバッドへの招待状, Barubaddo e no Shōtaijō); Night 202. "Alibaba's Household" (アリババの眷属, Aribaba no Kenzoku); Night 203. "Madly in Love" (ほれたのほれたの, Horeta no Horeta no); Night 204. "Sinbad and Yunan" (シンドバッドとユナン, Shindobaddo to Yunan); Night 205. "What is a King Vessel?" (王の器とは?, Ō no Utsuwa to wa?); Night 206. "An Evening at an Old Friend's House" (旧友との夜, Kyūyū to no Yoru); Night 207. "At Cassim's Grave" (カシムの墓, Kashimu no Haka); Night 208. "The Man Called Ren Koumei" (練紅明という男, Ren Kōmei to Iu Otoko)
22	July 18, 2014	978-4-09-124673-8; 978-4-09-159192-0 (LE)	February 14, 2017	978-1-4215-8398-3
Night 209. "Unified Ideology" (思想統一, Shisō Tōitsu); Night 210. "Conditions" (条件, Jōken); Night 211. "The Fanalis' Homeland" (ファナリスの故郷, Fanarisu no Kokyō); Night 212. "Dirty Hands" (汚い手, Kitanai Te); Night 213. "The Summit" (会談, Kaidan); Night 214. "The Homeland Where He Was Born" (生まれ故郷, Umare Kokyō); Night 215. "Legend" (神話, Shinwa); Night 216. "His Name is Solomon" (その名はソロモン, Sono Na wa Soromon); Night 217. "The Other Species" (異種族, Ishuzoku); Night 218. "The Great Sinners" (大罪人, Taizainin)
23	October 17, 2014	978-4-09-125278-4	April 11, 2017	978-1-4215-8399-0
Night 219. "Solomon's Real Identity" (ソロモンの正体, Soromon no Shōtai); Night 220. "Something in Common" (共通するもの, Kyōtsū suru Mono); Night 221. "Lovesickness" (恋情, Renjō); Night 222. "Mother Dragon" (原始竜, Mazā Doragon); Night 222.5. "David's Prophetic Writing" (ダビデの預言書, Dabide no Yogensho); Night 223. "Close" (誓い, Chikai); Night 224. "Courtship" (求愛, Kyūai); Night 225. "The Future" (未来, Mirai); Night 226. "King Solomon" (ソロモン王, Soromon Ō); Night 227. "The Decisive Final Battle" (最終決戦, Saishū Kessen); Night 228. "David's Plan" (ダビデの策, Dabide no Saku)
24	January 16, 2015	978-4-09-125557-0; 978-4-09-159201-9 (LE)	June 13, 2017	978-1-4215-8400-3
Night 229. "The World's Strongest Magician" (世界最強の魔導, Sekai Saikyō no Madō); Night 230. "David and Solomon" (ダビデとソロモン, Dabide to Soromon); Night 231. "To the World in Another Dimension" (異次元世界へ, I Jigen Sekai e); Night 232. "Solomon's World" (ソロモンの世界, Soromon no Sekai); Night 233. "The Rebellion Against The Light" (光への造反, Hikari e no Hangyaku); Night 234. "The Revolt of the Eight-Pointed Star" (八芒星の反乱, Hachibōsei no Hanran); Night 235. "The Return of Solomon" (ソロモンの帰還, Soromon no Kikan); Night 236. "Solomon's Avatar" (ソロモンのうつし身, Soromon no Utsushi Mi); Night 237. "How The New World Came To Be" (新たな世界の理, Arata na Sekai no Kotowari); Night 238. "Aladdin's Suggestion" (アラジンの提案, Arajin no Teian)
25	April 17, 2015	978-4-09-125810-6	August 8, 2017	978-1-4215-8690-8
Night 239. "Expectations of the Three Countries" (三国の思惑, Sangoku no Omowaku); Night 240. "The Black Magi's Answer" (黒マギの答え, Kuro Magi no Kotae); Night 241. "Different Decisions" (それぞれの覚悟, Sorezore no Kakugo); Night 242. "Hakuryuu's Determination" (白龍の決断, Hakuryū no Ketsudan); Night 243. "The Djinn of Truth and Conviction" (真実と断罪のジン, Shinjitsu to Danzai no Jin); Night 244. "The Black King Vessel" (黒き王の器, Kuroki Ō no Utsuwa); Night 245. "The Power of the New Djinn" (新たなジンの力, Aratana Jin no Chikara); Night 246. "The Admonition of Phenex" (フェニクスの戒め, Fenikusu no Imashime); Night 247. "The Decisive Battle at the Capital" (帝都決戦, Teito Kessen); Night 248. "Judar's Trump Card" (ジュダルの奥の手, Judaru no Oku no Te)
26	July 17, 2015	978-4-09-126188-5; 978-4-09-159211-8 (LE)	October 10, 2017	978-1-4215-8691-5
Night 249. "Hakuryuu's Resolve" (白龍の執念, Hakuryū no Shūnen); Night 250. "The New Emperor" (新たな皇帝, Aratana Ō); Night 251. "Hakuryuu's Imperial Edict" (白龍の勅令, Hakuryū no Chokurei); Night 252. "The Reunion of Two King Vessels" (王の器の再会, Ō no Utsuwa no Saikai); Night 253. "An Unyielding Battle" (譲れない戦い, Yuzurenai Tatakai); Night 254. "The Determination to Not Turn Back" (交わらぬ覚悟, Majiwaranu Kakugo); Night 255. "The Power of Omniscience" (全知の力, Zenchi no Chikara); Night 256. "The Invisible Power" (見えない力, Mienai Chikara); Night 257. "Belial's Djinn Equip" (魔装ベリアル, Masō Beriaru); Night 258. "The Decisive Battle Between Extreme Magic" (極大魔法決戦, Kyokudai Mahōkessen)
27	October 16, 2015	978-4-09-126469-5	December 12, 2017	978-1-4215-9509-2
Night 259. "The End of the King Vessel" (王の器の決着, Ō no Utsuwa no Ketchaku); Night 260. "The Extreme Power of Magic" (究極の力魔法, Kyūkyoku no Chikara Mahō); Night 261. "After the Death Match" (死闘の果てに, Shitō no Hate ni); Night 262. "Knowing Good from Evil" (善悪の判断, Zen'aku no Handan); Night 263. "Aladdin's Will" (アラジンの意志, Arajin no Ishi); Night 264. "Alibaba's Whereabouts" (アリババの行方, Aribaba no Yukue); Night 265. "The Beginning of the Great War" (大戦の幕開け, Taisen no Makuake); Night 266. "Encounter With the Unknown" (未知との遭遇, Michi to no Sōgū); Night 267. "The Night Before the Decisive Battle" (決戦前夜, Kessen Zen'ya); Night 268. "The Battle of Kanan" (華南の戦い, Kanan no Tatakai)
28	January 18, 2016	978-4-09-126695-8	February 13, 2018	978-1-4215-9510-8
Night 269. "The Duty of a General" (将たる務め, Shōtaru Tsutome); Night 270. "Encirclement Strategy" (包囲作戦, Hōi Sakusen); Night 271. "Breaking Through the Enemy's Formation" (敵陣突破, Tekijin Toppa); Night 272. "The Battle of the Households" (眷属合戦, Kenzoku Gassen); Night 273. "The Original Plan" (当初の計画, Tōsho no Keikaku); Night 274. "The Course of the War is Reversed" (覆る戦局, Kutsugaeru Senkyoku); Night 275. "The Bottom of the World" (世界の底, Sekai no Soko); Night 276. "The Will of God" (神の意志, Kami no Ishi); Night 277. "The Desired World" (望む世界, Nozomu Sekai); Night 278. "Confrontation Between Brothers" (兄弟の対面, Kyōdai no Taimen)
29	April 12, 2016	978-4-09-127088-7; 978-4-09-159228-6 (LE)	April 10, 2018	978-1-4215-9553-5
Night 279. "The Winner and the Loser" (勝者と敗者, Shōsha to Haisha); Night 280. "The Execution" (処刑執行, Shokei Shikkō); Night 281. "The Course of Vengeance" (復讐の行方, Fukushū no Yukue); Night 282. "A New Act Begins" (たな幕開け, Aratana Makuake); Night 283. "Alibaba's Return" (アリババの帰還, Aribaba no Kikan); Night 284. "Changes to the World" (世界の変容, Sekai no Hen'yō); Night 285. "In the Trading Company Headquarters" (商会本部へ, Shōkai Honbu e); Night 286. "The World Innovator" (世界の革新者, Sekai no Kakushin-sha); Night 287. "The Journey to Rakushou" (洛昌への旅路, Rakushō e no Tabiji); Night 288. "The New World Under Strain" (新世界の歪み, Shin Sekai no Hizumi)
30	July 15, 2016	978-4-09-127318-5	June 12, 2018	978-1-4215-9554-2
Night 289. "Alibaba's Power" (アリババの力, Aribaba no Chikara); Night 290. "Reunion With a Friend" (皇帝との再会, Tomo to no Saikai); Night 291. "Direct Negotiations" (直接交渉, Chokusetsu Kōshō); Night 292. "The Beginning of the Counterattack" (反撃の糸口, Hangeki no Itoguchi); Night 293. "The First Signs of Kou's Revival" (煌復活の狼煙, Kō Fukkatsu no Noroshi); Night 294. "The Leftover Assets" (残された財源, Nokosa reta Zaigen); Night 295. "The Strategist's Secret Plan" (軍師の秘策, Gunshi no Hisaku); Night 296. "Towards His Hometown" (故郷へ, Furusato e); Night 297. "The Plan's Chances of Success" (計画の勝算, Keikaku no Shōsan); Night 298. "As Someone Who Stands Above" (上に立つ者として, Ue ni Tatsu Mono to Shite)
31	November 18, 2016	978-4-09-127419-9	August 14, 2018	978-1-4215-9864-2
Night 299. "Reim's Way of Doing Things" (レームの在り方, Rēmu no Arikata); Night 300. "To Each His Own Path" (それぞれの道, Sorezore no Michi); Night 301. "As a Delegate" (代表として, Daihyō to Shite); Night 302. "Rivals" (ライバル, Raibaru); Night 303. "The Battle of the New Era" (新時代の戦い, Shin Jidai no Tatakai); Night 304. "A Voice from Beyond" (彼方からの声, Kanata kara no Koe); Night 305. "Incompatible Intentions" (交わらぬ意志, Majiwaranu Ishi); Night 306. "Arba's Intentions" (アルバの思惑, Aruba no Omowaku); Night 307. "Preparations Complete" (準備完了, Junbi Kanryō); Night 308. "The Guardian" (守り人, Moribito)
32	January 18, 2017	978-4-09-127484-7	October 9, 2018	978-1421598659
Night 309. "Yunan vs Arba" (ユナン対アルバ, Yunan Tai Aruba); Night 310. "The Results of Training" (修行の成果, Shugyō no Seika); Night 311. "The Rematch" (2年ぶりの再戦, 2-Nen-buri no Saisen); Night 312. "The Showdown with Al Thamen" (組織との決戦, Soshiki to no Kessen); Night 313. "Arba's Tenacity" (アルバの執念, Aruba no Shūnen); Night 314. "Reunion and Then..." (再開、そして, Saikai, Soshite); Night 315. "Making the Rounds" (挨拶回り, Aisatsu Mawari); Night 316. "David's Whispers" (ダビデの囁き, Dabide no Sasayaki); Night 317. "Sinbad's Bonds" (シンドバッドの絆, Shindobaddo no Kizuna); Night 318. "The Board of Directors' Response" (理事会の応酬, Riji-kai no Ōshū)
33	April 18, 2017	978-4-09-127557-8	December 11, 2018	978-1974700219
Night 319. "Kougyoku's Gratitude" (紅玉の感謝, Kōgyoku no Kansha); Night 320. "Arba's Proposal" (アルバの提案, Aruba no Teian); Night 321. "Sinbad's Smile" (シンドバッドの笑み, Shindobaddo no Emi); Night 322. "To The Heights" (高みまで, Takami made); Night 323. "The Adventure Won't End" (冒険は終わらない, Bōken wa Owaranai); Night 324. "The Gods' Multi-Layered Structure" (神の多重構造, Kami no Tajū Kōzō); Night 325. "The Sage Who Served the King" (王佐の賢者, Ōsa no Kenja); Night 326. "A Very Bad Feeling" (強烈な違和感, Kyōretsuna Iwakan); Night 327. "Dumped" (フられた, Fu Rareta); Night 328. "A Shared Hope" (共通の希望, Kyōtsū no Kibō)
34	June 16, 2017	978-4-09-127579-0	February 12, 2019	978-1974700226
Night 329. "The Greedy King of Man" (強欲な人の『王』, Gōyokuna Hito no "Ō"); Night 330. "Together, To The Rukh" (共にルフへ, Tomoni Rufu e); Night 331. "Alibaba's Choice" (アリババの選択, Aribaba no Sentaku); Night 332. "The Greatest King Vessel of All" (誰よりも大きな『王の器』, Dare yori mo Ōkina "Ō no Utsuwa"); Night 333. "The Gate to the Sacred Palace" (聖宮へのゲート, Seikyū e no Gēto); Night 334. "Facing" (ぶつかい合いながら, Butsu kai Ai nagara); Night 335. "The 7 Dungeons" (7つの迷宮, Nanatsu no Danjon); Night 336. "An Irrational Destiny" (理不尽な運命, Rifujin'na Unmei); Night 337. "The Conviction of Wrath and Heroes" (憤怒と英傑の信念, Funnu to Eiketsu no Shin'nen); Night 338. "Valefor" (ヴァレフォール, Varefōru)
35	August 18, 2017	978-4-09-127683-4	April 9, 2019	978-1-9747-0072-1
Night 339. "Conviction of Falsehood and Prestige" (虚偽と信望の信念, Kyogi to Shinbō no Shin'nen); Night 340. "A Battle To See Right From Wrong" (見極める戦い, Mikiwameru Tatakai); Night 341. "The Conviction of Souls and Puppetry" (精神と傀儡の信念, Seishin to Kairai no Shin'nen); Night 342. "The Innovator" (革新者, Kakushin-sha); Night 343. "A Certain Space" (とある空間, Toaru Kūkan); Night 344. "All Was Planned" (全ては布石, Subete wa Fuseki); Night 345. "A Magical Connection" (繋げる魔法, Tsunageru Mahō); Night 346. "Neither Future" (どちらでもない未来, Dochira Demonai Mirai); Night 347. "Feeling of Nothingness" (虚無感, Kyomu-kan); Night 348. "The Possibilities of Great Magic" (大魔法の可能性, Dai Mahō no Kanōsei); Night 349. "The People Involved" (巻き込まれる人間, Makikoma reru Ningen)
36	October 18, 2017	978-4-09-127853-1	June 11, 2019	978-1-9747-0303-6
Night 350. "Something Great and Impossible" (不可能な大事業, Fukanōna Dai Jigyō); Night 351. "The Magic to Return the World to the Ruhk" (世界をルフに還す魔法, Sekai o Rufu ni Kaesu Mahō); Night 352. "The Key to the Sacred Palace" (聖宮の鍵, Hijiri Nomiya no Kagi); Night 353. "Collection of the Ruhk" (ルフの回収, Rufu no Kaishū); Night 354. "The Battle to Protect the World" (地上を守る戦い, Chijō o Mamoru Tatakai); Night 355. "The Hierarchy of God" (神の序列, Kami no Joretsu); Night 356. "Requiem" (引導, Indō); Night 357. "A Member of the World" (世界の一員, Sekai no Ichiin); Night 358. "A Different Destiny" (異なる運命, Kotonaru Unmei); Night 359. "The Metal Vessels are for This Day's Sake" (金属器は今日のために, Kinzoku-ki wa Kyō no Tame ni)
37	November 17, 2017	978-4-09-127876-0	August 13, 2019	978-1-9747-0304-3
Night 360. "Alibaba's Answer" (アリババの答え, Aribaba no Kotae); Night 361. "The Final Blow" (最後の一撃, Saigo no Ichigeki); Night 362. "Destiny's Furthest Ends" (運命の最果て, Unmei no Saihate); Night 363. "Together This Time" (今こそ共に, Imakoso Tomoni); Night 364. "A Cruel But Free Path" (過酷で自由な道, Kakokude Jiyūna Michi); Night 365. "The Great Dungeon Towers" (迷宮の巨塔, Danjon no Kyotō); Night 366. "Cowardly Person" (おくびょうな人, Okubyōna Hito); Night 367. "Chaotic World" (混沌とした世界, Konton to Shita Sekai); Night 368. "The Breaking Point" (限界点, Genkai-ten); Night 369. "Wishes" (願い事, Negaigoto)
