= Nintama Rantarō season 1 =

Season of television series

This is a list of the episodes from the first series of the anime series Nintama Rantarō. The series aired from April 10, 1993, to March 19, 1994, on NHK for a total of 47 episodes. This is the only series to be 26 minutes and have episodes containing two 11-minute segments (with the exception of episode 38, which has three segments instead of two). The series was shortened to a 10-minute format starting from series 2.

The series' opening theme is Yūki 100% (勇気100% Yūki Hyaku Pāsento, "Courage 100%") by Hikaru Genji. The ending theme is Dancing Junk (ダンシング ジャンク) by Super Monkey's.

The series was released on VHS by Pony Canyon across twenty-two volumes, each containing four individual segments except for the last volume, which contains two full episodes along with filler material. The series was later released on DVD by Geneon Entertainment across two box sets in 2004. The first volume, containing episodes 1 through 24, was released on September 24. The second volume, containing episodes 25, 27, and 29 through 47, was released on December 22. For unknown reasons, episodes 26 and 28 are not included on the box set. Due to music licensing issues, the box sets do not include the season's ending theme.

== Episode list ==
No.	Title	Original release date
1	"Ninjutsu Academy Matriculation"; Transliteration: "Ninjutsu Gakuen Nyūgaku no Dan" (Japanese: 忍術学園入学の段)	10 April 1993
1	"Kunoichi Class Is Horrible"; Transliteration: "Kunoichi Kyōshitsu wa Osoroshii no Dan" (Japanese: くノ一教室はおそろしいの段)	10 April 1993
2	"Weird Ninja"; Transliteration: "Hen na Ninja no Dan" (Japanese: 変な忍者の段)	17 April 1993
2	"Memories of the Headmaster"; Transliteration: "Gakuenchō no Omoi Tsuki" (Japanese: 学園長の思いつきの段)	17 April 1993
3	"Shinbē Disappeared"; Transliteration: "Kieta Shinbē no Dan" (Japanese: 消えたしんべヱの段)	24 April 1993
3	"The Mysterious Delivery Ninja"; Transliteration: "Nazo no Bunshin Ninja no Dan" (Japanese: 謎の分身忍者の段)	24 April 1993
4	"Happy Golden Week"; Transliteration: "Tanoshii Gōrudan Uīku no Dan" (Japanese: 楽しいゴールデンウィークの段)	1 May 1993
4	"Shinbē Is Suspected"; Transliteration: "Shinbē Utagawareru no Dan" (Japanese: しんべヱ疑われるの段)	1 May 1993
5	"Master Fencer Makinosuke Hanabusa"; Transliteration: "Kengō Hanabusa Makinosuke no Dan" (Japanese: 剣豪・花房牧之介の段)	8 May 1993
5	"Who's the Most Amazing?"; Transliteration: "Ichiban Erai no wa Dare no Dan" (Japanese: 一番偉いのは誰の段)	8 May 1993
6	"Even Sneaking into Kunoichi Class"; Transliteration: "Kunoichi Kyōshitsu ni Sennyū Seyo no Dan" (Japanese: くノ一教室に潜入せよの段)	15 May 1993
6	"Shinbē's Disappeared"; Transliteration: "Shinbē ga Inai no Dan" (Japanese: しんべヱがいないの段)	15 May 1993
7	"Sneaky Genius"; Transliteration: "Shinobi no Tensai no Dan" (Japanese: 忍びの天才の段)	22 May 1993
7	"Eliminating the Thief"; Transliteration: "Dōzoku Taiji no Dan" (Japanese: 盗賊退治の段)	22 May 1993
8	"Martial Arts Tournament"; Transliteration: "Budō Taikai no Dan" (Japanese: 武道大会の段)	29 May 1993
8	"Heartwarming Camaraderie"; Transliteration: "Uruwashiki Jōkei no Dan" (Japanese: 麗しき友情の段)	29 May 1993
9	"Covert Courier Shinkurō"; Transliteration: "Misshi Shinkurō no Dan" (Japanese: 密使・新九郎の段)	5 June 1993
9	"Hustle to Nameko Castle"; Transliteration: "Nameko-jō e Hashire no Dan" (Japanese: ナメコ城へ走れの段)	5 June 1993
10	"The Pirate Who Couldn't Swim"; Transliteration: "Oyogenai Kaizoku no Dan" (Japanese: 泳げない海賊の段)	12 June 1993
10	"Love Sickness"; Transliteration: "Koi no Byō no Dan" (Japanese: 恋の病の段)	12 June 1993
11	"Aiming for Yamada-sensei"; Transliteration: "Yamada-sensei Nerawareru no Dan" (Japanese: 山田先生狙われるの段)	19 June 1993
11	"Combined Studies"; Transliteration: "Gōdō Jugyō no Dan" (Japanese: 合同授業の段)	19 June 1993
12	"Practice Traversing Kinokoyama"; Transliteration: "Kinokoyama Jūdan Kunren no Dan" (Japanese: キノコ山縦断訓練の段)	26 June 1993
12	"Master Fencer Makinosuke Hanabusa, Part II"; Transliteration: "Futatabi Kengō Hanabusa Makinosuke no Dan" (Japanese: 再び剣豪・花房牧之介の段)	26 June 1993
13	"Dad's Enemy"; Transliteration: "Chichi no Teki no Dan" (Japanese: 父の敵の段)	3 July 1993
13	"Summer Vacation's Over"; Transliteration: "Natsumi Yasumi ga Nakunaru no Dan" (Japanese: 夏休みがなくなるの段)	3 July 1993
14	"The Principal's Wall Scroll"; Transliteration: "Gakuenchō no Kakejiku no Dan" (Japanese: 学園長の掛け軸の段)	10 July 1993
14	"Revelation from God"; Transliteration: "Kamisama no Otsuge no Dan" (Japanese: 神様のお告げの段)	10 July 1993
15	"The Master of Maitake Castle"; Transliteration: "Maitake-jō no Dono no Dan" (Japanese: マイタケ城の殿の段)	17 July 1993
15	"Steal the Food!"; Transliteration: "Shokuryō o Ubae! no Dan" (Japanese: 食糧を奪え！の段)	17 July 1993
16	"The Boat of Kyōeimaru III"; Transliteration: "Daisan Kyōeimaru no Fune no Dan" (Japanese: 第三協栄丸の船の段)	24 July 1993
16	"Freezing Total Purification"; Transliteration: "Hieta Happō Imi no Dan" (Japanese: ひえた八方斎の段)	24 July 1993
17	"Shinbē's Apology"; Transliteration: "Shinbē no Gomen no Dan" (Japanese: しんべヱのごめんの段)	31 July 1993
17	"A Colorful Autumn"; Transliteration: "Iroiro na Aki no Dan" (Japanese: いろいろな秋の段)	31 July 1993
18	"Worried People"; Transliteration: "Nayameru Hitobito no Dan" (Japanese: 悩める人々の段)	7 August 1993
18	"The Legendary Sword Gokurakumaru"; Transliteration: "Meitō Gokurakumaru no dan" (Japanese: 名刀極楽丸の段)	7 August 1993
19	"The Disappearing Rice Bowl"; Transliteration: "Kieta Chawan no Dan" (Japanese: 消えた茶わんの段)	14 August 1993
19	"The Residence of Shinde Mohashirō"; Transliteration: "Shinde Mohashirō no Yashiki no Dan" (Japanese: 新出茂橋郎の屋敷の段)	14 August 1993
20	"The Amazing Younger Brother"; Transliteration: "Sugureta Oto no Dan" (Japanese: すぐれた弟の段)	21 August 1993
20	"The Phantom Matsutake"; Transliteration: "Maboroshi no Matsutake no Dan" (Japanese: 幻のマツタケの段)	21 August 1993
21	"Summer Vacation Fool"; Transliteration: "Natsuyasumi Boke no Dan" (Japanese: 夏休みボケの段)	28 August 1993
21	"The Rumoured Transfer Student"; Transliteration: "Uwasa no Tenkōsei no Dan" (Japanese: 噂の転校生の段)	28 August 1993
22	"Tensaimaru and Shūsaimaru"; Transliteration: "Tensaimaru to Shūsaimaru no Dan" (Japanese: 天才丸と秀才丸の段)	4 September 1993
22	"A Piercing Autumn Wind"; Transliteration: "Akikaze ga Minishimeru no Dan" (Japanese: 秋風が身にしみるの段)	4 September 1993
23	"Junko and Junichi"; Transliteration: "Junko to Junichi no Dan" (Japanese: ジュンコとジュンイチの段)	11 September 1993
23	"Fast as the Wind, Quiet as the Forest, Daring as Fire, Immovable as the Mountain (Note: This is a reference to Fūrinkazan, a quote from The Art of War by Sun Tzu.)"; Transliteration: "Fūrinkazan no Dan" (Japanese: 風林火山の段)	11 September 1993
24	"The Treasure Jar"; Transliteration: "Takara no Tsubo no Dan" (Japanese: 宝のツボの段)	18 September 1993
24	"Dokechi Failure"; Transliteration: "Dokechi Shippai no Dan" (Japanese: ドケチ失敗の段)	18 September 1993
25	"Ninja Assistance"; Transliteration: "Nintama Sukedachi no Dan" (Japanese: 忍たま助太刀の段)	25 September 1993
25	"The Headmaster's Red Bean Soup"; Transliteration: "Gakuenchō no Oshiruko no Dan" (Japanese: 学園長のお汁粉の段)	25 September 1993
26	"The Treacherous Trip"; Transliteration: "Kiken na Ensoku no Dan" (Japanese: 危険な遠足の段)	2 October 1993
26	"Bandit Brothers"; Transliteration: "Sanzoku Kyōdai no Dan" (Japanese: 山賊兄弟の段)	2 October 1993
27	"Nervous Ninja"; Transliteration: "Uchiki na Ninja no Dan" (Japanese: 内気な忍者の段)	9 October 1993
27	"Nettled Ninja"; Transliteration: "Iraira Ninja no Dan" (Japanese: イライラ忍者の段)	9 October 1993
28	"No Ordinary Dokechi"; Transliteration: "Tada no Dokechi Janai no Dan" (Japanese: ただのドケチじゃないの段)	16 October 1993
28	"The Headmaster's Straw Doll"; Transliteration: "Gakuenchō no Waraningyō no Dan" (Japanese: 学園長のワラ人形の段)	16 October 1993
29	"The First Year's Must Protect the Group!"; Transliteration: "Ichinen wa Kumi o Mamore! no Dan" (Japanese: 一年は組を守れ！の段)	23 October 1993
29	"The Troubled Kirimaru"; Transliteration: "Komatta Kirimaru no Dan" (Japanese: 困ったきり丸の段)	23 October 1993
30	"The Stolen Nameplate"; Transliteration: "Nusumareta Hyōsatsu no Dan" (Japanese: 盗まれた表札の段)	30 October 1993
30	"The Secret of the Nameplate"; Transliteration: "Hyōsatsu no Himitsu no Dan" (Japanese: 表札の秘密の段)	30 October 1993
31	"And the Princess...?"; Transliteration: "Ohime-sama no wa? no Dan" (Japanese: お姫さまは？の段)	30 October 1993
31	"Bandit Part-timer"; Transliteration: "Sanzoku Arubaito no Dan" (Japanese: 山賊アルバイトの段)	30 October 1993
32	"Burnt Bread Warehouse"; Transliteration: "Kurokoge Pankura no Dan" (Japanese: 黒こげパン蔵の段)	6 November 1993
32	"Tatami Scraps"; Transliteration: "Tatami no Kirehashi no Dan" (Japanese: たたみの切れはしの段)	6 November 1993
33	"Mom's Coming to School"; Transliteration: "Kaa-chan Gakuen ni Kiru no Dan" (Japanese: 母ちゃん学園に来るの段)	13 November 1993
33	"Dad's Promoted"; Transliteration: "Tō-chan Shussesuru no Dan" (Japanese: 父ちゃん出世するの段)	13 November 1993
34	"The Poison Under the Floor"; Transliteration: "Yakushita no Dokuyaku no Dan" (Japanese: 床下の毒薬の段)	20 November 1993
34	"Kiri-chan Blunders"; Transliteration: "Kiri-chan Shippai no Dan" (Japanese: きりちゃん失敗の段)	20 November 1993
35	"Shuriken Contest"; Transliteration: "Shuriken Konkũru no Dan" (Japanese: 手裏剣コンクールの段)	27 November 1993
35	"The Awesome Menu"; Transliteration: "Moeru Menyũ no Dan" (Japanese: 燃えるメニューの段)	27 November 1993
36	"It's Fool's Gold!"; Transliteration: "Nisekin Da! no Dan" (Japanese: ニセ金だ！の段)	4 December 1993
36	"Who's the Culprit?"; Transliteration: "Hannin wa Dare? no Dan" (Japanese: 犯人は誰？の段)	4 December 1993
37	"Kiri-chan's Part-time Job"; Transliteration: "Kiri-chan Arubaito no Dan" (Japanese: きりちゃんアルバイトの段)	11 December 1993
37	"Kiri-chan Is a Dokechi"; Transliteration: "Kiri-chan Dokechi no Dan" (Japanese: きりちゃんドケチの段)	11 December 1993
38	"Shinbē is Stroooong"; Transliteration: "Tsuyō Shinbē no Dan" (Japanese: ツヨーイしんべヱの段)	18 December 1993
38	"Washout Ninja"; Transliteration: "Rakudai Ninja no Dan" (Japanese: 落第忍者の段)	18 December 1993
38	"Who's the Best?"; Transliteration: "Ichiban Erai no wa? no Dan" (Japanese: 一番えらいのは？の段)	18 December 1993
39	"The Stolen Pole"; Transliteration: "Nusumareta Teppō no Dan" (Japanese: 盗まれた鉄砲の段)	25 December 1993
39	"Showdown at Dokutake Castle!"; Transliteration: "Taiketsu! Dokutake-jō no Dan" (Japanese: 対決！ドクタケ城の段)	25 December 1993
40	"Supplementary Ninja Exam"; Transliteration: "Nintama Tsuishi no Dan" (Japanese: 忍たま追試の段)	15 January 1994
40	"Goldfish Jealousy!"; Transliteration: "Kingyo Yāi! no Dan" (Japanese: 金魚やーい！の段)	15 January 1994
41	"The Dining Hall Has Been Stolen!"; Transliteration: "Shokudō Torareta! no Dan" (Japanese: 食堂取られた！の段)	22 January 1994
41	"It's an Onsen!"; Transliteration: "Onsen Daa! no Dan" (Japanese: 温泉だあ！の段)	22 January 1994
42	"Hemuhemu Is Gone!"; Transliteration: "Hemuhemu ga Inai! no Dan" (Japanese: ヘムヘムがいない！の段)	29 January 1994
42	"Give Back Hemuhemu!"; Transliteration: "Hemuhemu o Kaese! no Dan" (Japanese: ヘムヘムを返せ！の段)	29 January 1994
43	"To the Sausage!"; Transliteration: "Sōsēji e! no Dan" (Japanese: ソーセージへ！の段)	5 February 1994
43	"Victory to the Second Years!"; Transliteration: "Ninensei ni Katsu! no Dan" (Japanese: 二年生に勝つ！の段)	5 February 1994
44	"The Insanely Strong Band of Thieves"; Transliteration: "Mechatsuyoi Dōzokudan no Dan" (Japanese: メチャ強い盗賊団の段)	12 February 1994
44	"Search for the Weakness!"; Transliteration: "Jakuten o Sagase! no Dan" (Japanese: 弱点をさがせ！の段)	12 February 1994
45	"I'm Stuffed!"; Transliteration: "Onaka ga Ippai! no Dan" (Japanese: おなかがイッパイ！の段)	19 February 1994
45	"The Heart Becomes Fierce!"; Transliteration: "Kokoro o Oni ni! no Dan" (Japanese: 心を鬼に！の段)	19 February 1994
46	"Granny Catches a Cold!"; Transliteration: "Obachan Kaze o Hiku! no Dan" (Japanese: おばちゃん風邪をひく！の段)	12 March 1994
46	"Kirimaru Makes a Killing"; Transliteration: "Kirimaru Õmōke no Dan" (Japanese: きり丸大モウケの段)	12 March 1994
47	"I Want to Become a Teacher"; Transliteration: "Sensei ni Naritai no Dan" (Japanese: 先生になりたいの段)	19 March 1994
47	"A Beautiful Sunrise"; Transliteration: "Utsukushii Hinode no Dan" (Japanese: 美しい日の出の段)	19 March 1994
