= List of The Wallflower chapters =

The cover of The Wallflower volume 1 as released by Del Rey Manga in October 2004 in North America.

This is a list of the chapters that comprise the manga series The Wallflower, written by Tomoko Hayakawa. The individual chapters had been serialized in Bessatsu Friend from 2000 to 2015, and in 36 tankōbon volumes in Japan by Kodansha. The series was licensed for an English language release in North America by Del Rey Manga, in Singapore by Chuang Yi under the name My Fair Lady, and in Indonesia by Level Comics under the name Perfect Girl Evolution. It is now licensed by Kodansha USA.

== Chapter and volume list ==
No.	Original release date	Original ISBN	North American release date	North American ISBN
1	October 13, 2000	978-4-06-341210-9	October 2004	978-0-345-47912-9
Chapter 1: "A Light in the Darkness"; Chapter 2: "A Mission to Cut the Hair"; Chapter 3: "A Bright Eye-Opening World"; Chapter 4: "Ah, a Nostalgic Dark Past"; Chapter 5: "A Walking into the Light"
It's a gorgeous, spacious mansion, and four handsome, fifteen-year-old friends are allowed to live in it for free! There's only one condition—that within three years the guys must transform the owner's wallflower niece into a lady befitting the palace in which they all live! How hard can it be? Enter Sunako Nakahara, the agoraphobic, horror-movie-loving, pockmark-faced, frizzy-haired, fashion-illiterate recluse who tends to break into explosive nosebleeds whenever she sees anyone attractive. This project is going to take more than our four heroes ever expected: it needs a miracle!
2	March 13, 2001	978-4-06-341228-4	December 2004	978-0-345-47949-5
Chapter 6: "An Inviting Sunako"; Chapter 7: "A Happy Shocking Christmas"; Chapter 8: "The Eve Before Sunako Turns Into a Lady"; Chapter 9: "Hot Springs Trip - Snow, Flowers, a Murder (part 1)"
Four fabulous guys must completely transform a high school girl if they want to keep living rent-free in her aunt's luxurious mansion. But Sunako Nakahara, the most fashion-hopeless girl in Japan, would rather live like a hermit and watch her favorite horror movies than undergo a makeover. When the guys stumble upon the mansion's secret subbasement, they discover the ghost of a prim and proper lady who (thankfully) begins to possess Sunako's soul. It seems their problem is solved. Too bad that Sunako's now-suitable personality includes a desire to lock the boys up in the mansion's dungeon!
3	July 13, 2001	978-4-06-341242-0	March 2005	978-0-345-47999-0
Chapter 10: "Hot Springs Trip - Snow, Flowers, a Murder (part 2)"; Chapter 11: "Is the Enemy the Exam or Takano"; Chapter 12: "A Violent Stormy Girl"; Chapter 13: "A Banquet for the Beautiful"; Chapter 14: "I am No. 1"
MAYBE A fabulous foursome of gorgeous guys may live in a magnificent mansion for free, but only if they can turn Sunako, the horror-movie-obsessed, fashion-illiterate niece of the owner, into a proper lady. Oh, and did the aunt mention that Sunako needs to get good grades, too? Sunako must achieve an average above 80 percent, or the deal's off. No problem! Sunako scores high in all subjects-except math, which she consistently fails miserably. Now the guys have to tutor their reluctant student through hours of course work, avoiding the pitfalls of her gruesome hobbies, explosive nosebleeds, and tendency to faint whenever anybody refers to her kiss with Kyohei. Math would be easier without so much division!
4	December 13, 2001	978-4-06-341261-1	June 2005	978-0-345-48001-9
Chapter 15: "The Summer is Too Hot"; Chapter 16: "Matchmaking Trouble (part 1)"; Chapter 17: "Matchmaking Trouble (Part 2)"; Chapter 18: "A Dreamy Halloween"
Four gorgeous yet determined guys are still struggling to turn their reluctant, homely housemate Sunako into a proper lady. So far, the dreamy quartet have miraculously managed to cover up Sunako's total lack of progress from their landlady, Sunako's aunt, who is eager to see results. She has even set Sunako up on a blind date! If the aunt finds out that Sunako is still clinging to the darkness, their rent is sure to skyrocket. It looks like the only way out is to convince the meddling relative that Sunako already has a boyfriend. But which of the four guys could possibly pull off such a demanding role?
5	June 13, 2002	978-4-06-341287-1	September 2005	978-0-345-48094-1
Special: "Little Red Riding Sunako"; Chapter 19: "I'm Not Scared of any Love Rival"; Chapter 20: "Valentine Day Battle"; Chapter 21: "A Dark Brown Memory"; Chapter 22: "Oh, My Sweet Home (part 1)"
Sunako Nakahara and her four handsome housemates are enjoying their glamorous lifestyle at her aunt's mansion-until Sunako's father makes a surprise appearance. After learning that Sunako is going out with Kyohei, he flies all the way from Africa to investigate whether Kyohei is worthy of his precious daughter! Sunako vows to keep at least one secret from her prying father: her room full of horror-movie memorabilia. She urges him to leave immediately and peacefully. But will she be able to bid him a fond farewell before Kyohei is worn out by his tests and her blessed haven is discovered?
6	December 13, 2002	978-4-06-341317-5	December 2005	978-0-345-48370-6
Chapter 23: "Oh, My Sweet Home (part 2)"; Chapter 24: "A Childhood Friend, I Wish you Eternal Happiness"; Chapter 25: "You're Prettier than a Rose"; Chapter 26: "A Rowdy Swimming Competition"
How did four of Japan's hottest guys end up living in the same magnificent mansion? The shocking revelations continue! And whatever happened to the idea of giving Sunako a major makeover? If the foursome wants to remain in their luxurious surroundings, they need to follow through on the original agreement. Sunako's aunt will no doubt threaten to kick them out (again!) if they fail to transform Sunako from a dark loner into a beautiful young lady.
7	March 13, 2003	978-4-06-341328-1	March 2006	978-0-345-48371-3
Chapter 27: "Oui, Monsieur"; Chapter 28: "Whose Child is this Energetic Child"7; Chapter 29: "The World's Strongest Women"; Chapter 30: "A Weird Chat in Cold Winter"
Four of Japan's hottest guys are doing their best in their mission to turn dark, macabre Sunako into a dainty young woman. Gorgeous Ranmaru is famous for his smooth way with the ladies. But when a cute toddler named Rin shows up calling Ranmaru "Daddy," it seems that Ranmaru's days of swinging bachelorhood may be over! Ranmaru swears that Rin is not his kid, but they sure look an awful lot alike. Ranmaru does his darndest to avoid the little boy, but Sunako turns out to have a soft spot for the little squirt. It looks like Ranmaru just might have to accept his role as father-and Sunako seems like the perfect mom. Will motherhood finally turn Sunako into a true lady?
8	August 8, 2003	978-4-06-341346-5	July 2006	978-0-345-48526-7
Special Gorgeous Chapter: "Mori Splendid Day"; Chapter 31: "His True Intentions"; Chapter 32: "The Queen of Horror Competition"; Chapter 33: "Cherry Blossoms"; Chapter 34: "Paramount Restaurant"
Four of Japan's most gorgeous guys have the near-impossible task of turning goth-loner Sunako into a lady. When they find Sunako all dressed up and ready for a night on the town, the guys think their luck may have finally changed. Hoping to catch a glimpse of Sunako's date, the quartet follow her out the door. But instead of a handsome young prince, they find an old granny with a taste for the macabre! Granny's Museum of Horrors is closing shop and she's promised all of the remaining items to her best (and only) customer, Sunako. Just what the guys need-more gruesome artifacts cluttering their house. Sunako is hoping to bring her horrific treasures home, but the guys will do anything to stop her . . . even if it means all-out war.
9	January 13, 2004	978-4-06-341369-4	September 2006	978-0-345-48527-4
Chapter 35: "The Road to Becoming a Lady (part 1)"; Chapter 36: "The Road to Becoming a Lady (part 2)"; Chapter 37: "A Prince in Sheep's Clothing"; Chapter 38: "Going Home to Face a Typhoon"
Four of Japan's hottest guys are struggling (in elegant surroundings) with the biggest challenge of their lives . . . transforming the geeky goth, Sunako, into a delicate lady. When Sunako's auntie-and the guys's landlady-arrives unannounced, she finds Sunako enjoying a slasher flick in the darkest recesses of her room. Clearly no progress has been made! So auntie decides there's only one way to turn her niece into a lady: Send Sunako and Kyohei on a little romantic getaway. Their accommodations for the evening consist of a vibrating bed, two-way mirrors, and a security guard who's blocking the only exit. Can Sunako survive a night alone with a creature of the light?
10	June 11, 2004	978-4-06-341388-5	December 2006	978-0-345-48530-4
Chapter 39: "A Typhoon Wreaks Everything in its Path"; Chapter 40: "Dreams Come True"; Chapter 41: "The Princess of the Sleeping Forest"; Chapter 42: "Winter Wonderland"
Poor Kyohei is cursed . . . no, not by the devil or evil spirits. Not even by the dark, macabre Sunako, the girl he and his three pals have been trying to transform into a demure lady. Kyohei is cursed by his own good looks. When Sunako rejects him for being too good-looking, Kyohei runs way. His friends wonder what could have happened to him, but only Sunako, racked with guilt, knows the truth. It appears that the only way for Sunako to save poor Kyohei is to become a true creature of the light. But can Sunako finally emerge from the Goth shadows and bring Kyohei home, or will she be drawn back into the darkness once again?
11	November 12, 2004	978-4-06-341406-6	March 2007	978-0-345-49475-7
Chapter 43: "Girls Bravo!"; Chapter 44: "Test of True Love"; Chapter 45: "Sunako is Champion"; Chapter 46: "The Picture of Love"
Determined to turn goth loner Sunako into a real lady, and frustrated by their lack of progress, the guys persuade a reluctant Kyohei to take Sunako out on her first date. Now they just have to convince Sunako, who equates dating with suicide. They trick Sunako by promising her VIP seats at a pro-wrestling death match (the operative word being death). The possibility of seeing blood spilled really gets Sunako excited. What's more, she even lets Kyohei take her out afterward to a horror flick and a delicious dinner. But wait . . . dinner and a movie . . . that almost sounds like a . . . "Noooooooooooooooo!"
12	March 11, 2005	978-4-06-341420-2	June 2007	978-0-345-49556-3
Chapter 47: "The Right Way to Spend the Summer"; Chapter 48: "The Love of Summer Vacation"; Chapter 49: "This is the Beautiful High School Life"; Chapter 50: "All for the Fried Pawns"
Mori High's annual school festival is fast approaching, and Sunako's class is gearing up to perform a cosplay cafe. Sunako's roomies, the four hottest guys in Japan, are shocked when Sunako leaves the dark recesses of her room and heads out shopping with a gaggle of high school girls. However, what Sunako thought was a simple cosplay supply shopping trip soon turns into a full-blown girly event complete with karaoke, ritzy boutiques, and even a photo booth. Can the dark Sunako survive an entire day of perky pink-infested fun? Could this be her first step on the path to ladyhood?
13	June 13, 2005	978-4-06-341429-5	September 2007	978-0-345-49557-0
Chapter 51: "Lovely Bonds"; Chapter 52: "Brilliant Accident (part 1)"; Chapter 53: "Brilliant Accident (part 2)"; Chapter 54: "Thinking About Chance Encounter"
Sunako just wants to remain in seclusion inside her dark room, but glam Auntie has other plans and drags her niece to a party. Upon arrival, Sunako takes refuge in an empty coffin, where she finds a diamond. Imagine morbid Sunako's delight when she learns the jewel is cursed!
14	November 11, 2005	978-4-06-341452-3	January 2008	978-0-345-49558-7
Special Gorgeous Chapter: "Mori One Day of Depression"; Chapter 55: "Jealous Generation"; Chapter 56: "Dream Mutual Love"; Chapter 57: "Let's go to School"; Chapter 58: "Sweet Typhoon"
When a sudden storm traps goth chick Sunako and super-hot Kyohei in the basement, Sunako is ecstatic. Not because she can use the opportunity to get closer to such a cute guy, but because she can't wait to explore the deepest, dankest recesses of the mansion! Even when hunger sets in, and the chance for survival seems slim, Sunako is thrilled. If she can live a few minutes longer than Kyohei, she can finally see a real corpse! Will her dark dream come true?
15	March 13, 2006	978-4-06-341464-6	April 2008	978-0-345-49919-6
Chapter 59: "Memory's Door"; Chapter 60: "Baka Big Brother Rhapsody"; Chapter 61: "That Is The Question, To lLove Or Not To Love"; Chapter 62: "Memory Of Love"
It may be hard to believe, but Sunako was once a typical junior high school girl. She hung out with her girlfriends and talked about boys. But when the guy she had a crush on told her she was ugly, Sunako turned her back on the world. Now there's going to be a reunion at school, and guess who will be there? You guessed it . . . him! Can Sunako leave the darkness to face her archnemesis?
16	July 13, 2006	978-4-06-341478-3	July 2008	978-0-345-50171-4
Chapter 63: "Onobori-san to Go"; Chapter 64: "Pheromone BOMB"; Chapter 65: "The Hazardous Return of Valentine's Day"; Chapter 66: "Sunako's Ideal Body Building"
The four hottest boys in Japan have just one goal: Turn the goth-girl Sunako into a true lady. And suddenly they're making progress! First, Sunako ventures out on a shopping trip to one of Tokyo's trendiest neighborhoods (very un-Sunako). Then she gets super-excited about Valentine's Day (even more un-Sunako). Finally, when the landlady invites Sunako to a ball to meet a real prince, our gothic heroine goes on a crash diet (extremely un-Sunako). Is Sunako finally shedding her dark disposition?
17	November 13, 2006	978-4-06-341493-6	September 2008	978-0-345-50659-7
Chapter 67: "The Way to Become Pretty"; Chapter 68: "Dancing Steps to Lady Achievement"; Chapter 69: "The Blues of the Unbeatable One"; Chapter 70: "The Dreams They Both Shared"
Just when Sunako and the four hottest guys in Japan had finally gotten used to living together, their landlady springs a shocking surprise: She's going to remodel the mansion and they'll be temporarily relocated to a luxury hotel. Now Sunako and the guys are living it up in a gorgeous five-star pleasure palace-exactly the type of place Sunako can't stand. To make matters worse, the landlady has reserved a special suite just for Sunako and Kyohei. Unable to cope, Sunako flees in terror, and Kyohei follows. Now Sunako and Kyohei are hiding out together in a tiny studio apartment. Wait a sec. It's almost like they're . . . shacking up!
18	March 13, 2007	978-4-06-341514-8	January 2009	978-0-345-50660-3
Chapter 71: "Won't Lose to Poverty and Society"; Chapter 72: "Takenaga's Honor"; Chapter 73: "Love, Love Revolution"; Chapter 74: "That's the Dreamy 1st Love"
The Nakahara mansion is under construction, and the entire gang is being put up at a fancy five-star hotel. Except, of course, for Sunako and Kyohei, who just can't handle living in the lap of luxury. They opt instead for a tiny apartment, but they can barely afford the rent. Sunako has no choice but to get a job, and the only jobs that pay well happen to be in the nearby red-light district. Sunako sneaks off and finds herself a gig at one of the local clubs, where she rakes in the dough. But when news of her new job reaches the bishonen, they freak! After all, if the landlady finds out that Sunako is working in a hostess club, the guys might never get to move back into the Nakahara mansion!
19	August 10, 2007	978-4-06-341537-7	April 2009	978-0-345-50661-0
Chapter 75: "Lightness and Darkness Collide"; Chapter 76: "Love is a Mirage"; Chapter 77: "The Way to Become a Domestic Man"; Chapter 78: "The Tale of the Prince and the Princess"
Sunako's auntie, the landlady, lost her one true love years ago, but is death really forever? When the landlady visits the mansion, Ranmaru, the notorious playboy, begins to act strange. In fact, he's behaving just like the landlady's deceased husband. There's only one explanation: Ranmaru's been possessed by the ghost of the landlady's long-ago love. Now the landlady is ready to spend some quality time with her mate. But wait-he's still Ranmaru on the outside. Kyaaaaaa!
20	January 11, 2008	978-4-06-341557-5	June 2009	978-0-345-51029-7
Chapter 79: "Capture the Princess!"; Chapter 80: "House Arrest! Beautiful Sacrifice!"; Chapter 81: "Who is "Mister" Morikou?"; Chapter 82: "The Japanese New Year"
Sunako is a great cook, but her croissant recipe needs help. Luckily, the landlady happens to know a royal family famous for its master bakers. Sunako and the gang are whisked off to the small kingdom of Grimmel, but the landlady has ulterior motives: The young prince of Grimmel is looking for a bride, and his tastes are almost as morbid as Sunako's. It looks like Sunako might accept the prince's proposal-unless Kyohei is willing to speak now or forever hold his peace.
21	July 11, 2008	978-4-06-341584-1	September 2009	978-0-345-51432-5
Chapter 83: Special Story: "Machiko-chan Returns!!"; Chapter 84: "Kyouhei is Legend: Again"; Chapter 85: "If It's You, I'd Walk Through Fire and Water."; Chapter 86: "Yeah! Super Pink Unrequited Love"; Chapter 87: "The Sunako Inside the Mirror"
The rumor is spreading that Kyohei and Sunako are an item, and many jealous women are out for blood. Their target? An unsuspecting Sunako, who now can't even go to the store without endangering herself. Kyohei is oblivious until his friends convince him to protect Sunako. But what if Kyohei's chivalry only makes life even more miserable for her?
22	December 12, 2008	978-4-06-341599-5	October 2010	978-0-345-51460-8
Chapter 88: "Dark Girl on the Beach"; Chapter 89: "Hotel's Serenade"; Chapter 90: "Sunako becomes a Star"; Chapter 91: "The Path to Becoming a Dark Lady (Part I)"
It's summertime, and all Sunako wants to do is stay in the darkest depths of her room. But the guys are desperate to complete Sunako's transformation into a lady-which means a weekend at a beachside resort. Now Sunako is trapped in a fancy five-star hotel and surrounded by creatures of the light. To escape on the train back to Tokyo she needs cash, and winning the Capture the Flag competition will solve that problem. Victory seems like a sure thing for Sunako-until she meets her competition: none other than Kyohei!
23	May 13, 2009	978-4-06-341622-0	October 2010	978-0-345-51460-8
Chapter 92: "The Path to Becoming a Dark Lady (Part II)"; Chapter 93: "Welcome Fuckin' Xmas Night"; Chapter 94: "A Seasoned Pro's Paradise"; Chapter 95: "Sleepless Tonight"
Released in North America by Kodansha USA as a collection of volumes 22, 23 and 24.
24	September 11, 2009	978-4-06-341640-4	October 2010	978-0-345-51460-8
Chapter 96: "I Want To See You (Part I)"; Chapter 97: "I Want To See You (Part 2)"; Chapter 98: "Burn!! Sebastian!"; Chapter 99: "The Great Bond"
Released in North America by Kodansha USA as a collection of volumes 22, 23 and 24.
25	February 12, 2010	978-4-06-341666-4	June 21, 2011	978-1-93-542991-3
Chapter 100: "Sunako's Curse"; Chapter 101: "Go Go, Miss Sunako"; Chapter 102: "Lets Go Mushroom Hunting"; Chapter 103 "Present For You!"
After the gorgeous Kyohei kisses her, the anxious and awkward Sunako becomes convinced that it was harassment. She gets revenge by putting a curse on Kyohei, but when he becomes severely ill, it appears that her curse went too far. Only a kiss from Sunako can break the curse, but can she finally admit that she really does care about him? Or will her penchant for darkness be his true downfall?
26	June 11, 2010	978-4-06-341687-9	September 27, 2011	978-1-93-542992-0
Chapter 104: "Shouting Love In The Middle Of The Cooking Room"; Chapter 105: "Once Again, The Great Hot Bath"; Chapter 106: "Everyday Restaurant"; Chapter 107: "My Beloved N-110"
The handsome foursome are all in an uproar once more when they are led to believe that Sunako has fallen in love with their science teacher. Their theory is followed up with evidence: for one, the science teacher is quite handsome; two, Sunako has never looked lovelier: and three, Sunako keeps on sneaking out to see him. Will Kyohei simply stand back and watch as he loses his love, or will he make a stand for her?
27	December 13, 2010	978-4-06-341718-0	November 22, 2011	978-1-93-542994-4
Chapter 108: "The Legendary Maid"; Chapter 109: "The One and Only Flower in the World"; Chapter 110: "A Midsummer Night's Nightmare"; Chapter 111: "A Veteran's Tribulation"
Four cute guys face the continuing challenge of trying to transform dark loner Sunako into a well-mannered young lady. Will their efforts be thwarted when Sunako starts working as a maid? if she learns how to become a proper lady – not only will they lose their free rent, but one of them may also lose Sunako's heart.
28	April 13, 2011	978-4-06-341740-1	May 22, 2012	978-1-61-262118-0
Chapter 112: "Save the Shopping Arcade"; Chapter 113: "An Exciting and Scary Carnival"; Chapter 114: "The Ooedo Era Eating House Incident (Part 1)"; Chapter 115: "The Ooedo Era Eating House Incident (Part 2)"
Four cute guys face their continuing challenge of trying to transform dark loner Sunako into a well-mannered young lady. Will a trip to the fair bring beauty and joy into her world? If she learns how to become a proper, fun young lady – not only will they lose their free rent, but one of them may also lose Sunako's heart.
29	September 13, 2011	978-4-06-341759-3	December 4, 2012	978-1-61-262241-5
Chapter 116: "The Chocolate War Outbreak!"; Chapter 117: "Chairman Takano's Inauguration!"; Chapter 118: "Ah, Wonderful Nudism"; Chapter 119: "Maybe It's a Fantasy"
School may never be the same with Kyohei assuming the school presidency! With power should come responsibility, but in Kyohei's case, exploitation and abuse are more likely. Meanwhile, the boys try to get Sunako to shape up and slim down by forbidding her from eating chocolate. However, the call of cocoa is maddeningly compelling...
30	December 13, 2011	978-4-06-341774-6	February 12, 2013	978-1-61-262244-6
Chapter 120: "Queen of Pirates"; Chapter 121: "Dear My Friend!"; Chapter 122: "Lovesickness"; Chapter 123: "Go Masked Man!"
Sunako and the handsome foursome cannot be stopped! Sunako dresses up as a pirate to get her aunt's jewelry back! For Halloween, Sunako and the Princess host a horror party! And then, the Princess' fiance Ranmaru gets close with Sunako in bed... How will Kyouhei react?
31	June 13, 2012	978-4-06-341798-2	August 6, 2013	978-1-61-262245-3
Chapter 124: "Takenaga's Way of Life"; Chapter 125: "Because I Love You"; Chapter 126: "Bishounen's Tragedy"; Chapter 127: "I am their brother!"
Reasonable Takenaga and wild boy Kyohei have got to learn to live with one another. And to do that... they're going to seclude themselves together in the mountains?! Meanwhile, Sunako's childhood friend Yuki has her first date since coming to Tokyo, but the power of the snow woman turns Kyohei to ice! What will Sunako do to heat him back up? Surely not... that?!
32	December 13, 2012	978-4-06-341830-9	May 27, 2014	978-1-61-262443-3
Chapter 128; Chapter 129; Chapter 130; Chapter 131
Sunako joins the classical ballet club! As she piourettes across the stage as the Black Swan, will she finally come into her own as a lady?! Meanwhile, has the playboy Ranmaru been possessed by the spirit of a beautiful woman?! And has the brash Kyohei become a pacifist?!
33	April 12, 2013	978-4-06-341851-4	August 2014	978-1-61-262551-5
Chapter 132; Chapter 133; Chapter 134; Chapter 135
Noi and Takenaga clash on a group date at the amusement park! There's no time for love when it's an all out battle! And the trouble doesn't end there when a New Year's Eve countdown party at the Nakahara mansion turns into a scene of chaos. With giant crabs and hordes of savage girls, will Sunako and the boys ever make it out of the year alive?!
34	October 11, 2013	978-4-06-341881-1	February 2015	978-1-61-262804-2
Chapter 136: "Climb the Staircase to Adulthood!"; Chapter 137: "Show Time of Sweat and Tears!!"; Chapter 138: "Imp Sparkling"; Chapter 139: "Imp Sparkling (continued)"
Sunako ends up in a less-than-glamorous part-time job, donning a panda costume to work as a mascot at an amusement park. Though delicious cake awaits her if she does a good job, she fails miserably. But as luck would have it, she may have a chance to redeem herself when she and the boys of Nakahara Mansion are asked to perform in a Power-Ranger-style stage show. Is the promise of mouth-watering cake enough for Sunako to deliver a thrilling and action-packed performance for the amusement park's attendees?
35	September 12, 2014	978-4-06-341937-5	August 2015	978-1-61-262834-9
Chapter 140: "Dark Paradise"; Chapter 141: "Please <3 God"; Chapter 142: "Magic Love Potion"; Chapter 143: "Pirates of the Desert Island"
Avast ye! Sunako and the four beautiful lads of Nakahara Mansion set sail for yet another adventure along the treachorous course to Sunako's ever evasive ladyhood! Along the way, they'll see things that will make even the saltiest of seadogs shiver their timbers as the boys venture into Sunako's dark world, witness the awesome power of a sacred tree, and take a crack at courtship. But what Sunako seeks is treasure, and she's determined to get her hands on some pieces of eight with the help of her handsome skeleton crew no matter what danger awaits!
36	February 13, 2015	978-4-06-341966-5	April 26, 2016	9781632362100
Chapter 144: "Happy? Halloween"; Chapter 145: "Mori High Festival Legend"; Chapter 146: "Operations Lovey-Dovey Date"; (THE FINAL CHAPTER) Chapter 147: "Lovable Sunako Forever"
The mad dash to ladyhood for horror-girl Sunako and her dazzlingly beautiful boys draws to a close in their last adventure. Things start to heat up for Sunako and Kyohei, as the romance between the unlikely couple reaches maximum levels! As they interact with each other at a Halloween party, the Mori High Cultural Festival, and even a cruise ship, it seems that Sunako may finally become a lady!
