= Love Sick (novel) =

2005 novel by Jake Coburn

- Author: Jake Coburn
- Language: English
- Genre: Young Adult Literature
- Publisher: Dutton Juvenile
- Publication date: September 22, 2005
- Pages: 240
- ISBN: 0-525-47383-1

Love Sick is a novel by Jake Coburn, first published on September 22, 2005 by Dutton Juvenile.

== Plot ==
Love Sick follows the story of Ted, a former teenage alcoholic, as he spies on a girl, Erica, at their college for her father. After a drunk driving collision his senior year, Ted is left with a busted knee and no college scholarship. The novel opens with Ted, the protagonist, speaking at an AA meeting at his three-month mark. He talks about how he had been drinking throughout his four years at high school, and talks about the drunk driving collision that caused him to lose his scholarship. After his AA meeting, he goes home, where he meets Michael Eslem. Michael tells Ted that he was there to offer Ted a deal to get him back into his university. He could go to his dream college completely free, except he would have to spy on Erica at the college. With convincing, Ted agrees to the deal.

Erica's opening scene is when she steals mini donuts from a grocery store and eats them at her house. She eats 12 of them, a calorie overdose and we learn she throws up afterward and does this often. Throughout the book, her father and her spill information about her former and ongoing struggle including her having to be hospitalized from purging too much. Understanding the Yahoo Chess chats with her therapist allows the reader to know that her conversations are confined and her father cannot know about them, but this is the very reason for Ted needing to spy on her.

Through a series of emails, it is agreed that Ted will be placed in the same dorm as Erica, making it as easy as possible to spy on her. On his first day, he briefly encounters Erica leaving the bathroom. Slowly, they get to know each other as they deal with their problems. Ted connects with Erica in many ways, including when she woke up in Ted's roommate's bed having a hangover. Ted attends local AA meetings, and Erika talks with her therapist over Yahoo Chess.

As the book progresses, Erica and Ted confess their feelings for one another, and they spend the night in Ted's dorm room. Ted realizes he does not want to spy on Erica any longer, and so he calls Michael and quits. Following this, he takes some of his roommate's alcohol, drinking until Erica wakes up and he tells her. Erica gets angry and leaves for the city, contacting Doctor Rudas and asking to go into rehab to deal with her problem of bulimia. Back at college, Ted realizes his mistake.

This mistake angers Michael, and in the car, driving with him, he pulls a gun on Ted. With no other choice and options, Ted crashes the car into a tree and the story ends concludes at this point. The severity of the control of Michael and Erica's father is shown completely in this scene.

This novel contains romance, alcohol and bulimia struggles, with a very college-like scene. Though the dramatic influences and struggles and scenes, it is written at a typical late middle schooler's reading level despite being recommended for high school students so that they may wholly understand it. The novel is also a great example of these illnesses, and can be read at any level above late middle school for more examples of the illnesses or just for a pleasant book written in the flowing words of the author.

== Characters ==
- Ted York, the protagonist of ‘’Love Sick,’’ is a former alcoholic and star basketball player. At the end of his senior year, he gets in a drunk driving collision and busts his knee, making him unable to play basketball. He is described as “Dennis Quaid gorgeous,” and has “nervous, Granny Smith eyes.”
- Erica Prakers, the daughter of a rich banker, is bulimic, and has curly black hair. A college girl with money and people watching her everywhere she goes. Before the book begins, on July Fourth, she collapses due to lack of electrolytes. After this, her father makes her go to therapists sessions to help her problem.
- Michael Eslem, the employer of the protagonist, is described as a “wiry, olive skinned man with a jagged widow’s peak.” His parents were both killed when he was three because of a car bomb in Istanbul, so he was raised by “Brit classics scholar.” He is also a former spy.
- Doctor Rudas is Erica's therapist, and is a middle aged man with “swollen ankles.” Throughout the novel, Doctor Rudas talks with Erica about her problems with bulimia and her life at college in a private, online “YAHOO CHESS table.” They use the chess table as it is completely private from her father and he is unable to access the chats.
- Charles Prakers, Erica's father, a rich banker who hires the protagonist to spy on his daughter at their college. He is described by Erica as having a “spherical gut,” which she refers to as “Brother-to-Be.” The analysts at his company call him “Prakes,” his old nickname from college. He has brown eyes.
- James, the roommate of the protagonist at their fictional college, is described as “short” and a party boy. In their dorm room, he has several shelves of alcohol.

== Reception ==
The School Library Journal said Love Sick is a "fast-paced narrative." Also, they add, “Love Sick will keep readers rooting for these teens.”

Booklist praised the author's characterization. “Coburn manages to imbue Ted and his spoiled-rich-kid characters with a surprising humanity. The dialogue is gritty and realistic, and Coburn’s writing skill is evident in his almost sensual descriptions of Erica’s binging rituals.” Additionally, the reviewer added, Michael's “breezy, cheesy, e-mails provide comic relief.”

== Bibliography ==
Coburn, Jake. (2005). Love Sick. New York: Dutton Juvenile.
