= Successive interference cancellation =

Successive interference cancellation (SIC) is a technique a receiver uses in a wireless data transmission that allows decoding of two or more packets that arrived simultaneously (in a regular system, more packets arriving simultaneously cause a collision).

SIC is achieved by the receiver decoding the stronger signal first, subtracting it from the combined signal and then decoding the difference as the weaker signal.
